= Sherry Combs Johnson =

American barrel racer (1938–2023)

Personal information
- Born: August 16, 1938; Duncan, Oklahoma
- Died: August 2, 2023 (aged 84)

Sport
- Sport: Rodeo
- Event: Barrel racing

Sherry Combs Johnson (August 16, 1938 – August 2, 2023) was an American ProRodeo Hall of Fame barrel racer. In 1962, she won the barrel racing world championship at the National Finals Rodeo (NFR) in Fort Worth, Texas.

== Life ==
Sherry Combs Johnson was born Sherry Price on August 16, 1938, in Duncan, Oklahoma. Combs and her ProRodeo Hall of Fame sister, Florence Youree, grew up on their father's ranch near Addington, Oklahoma. The sisters were the only children of rancher John Henry Price. Youree always said they worked on his ranch "as his boys". They had his love of horses and rodeo. Youree met Dale Youree as a teenager. Dale was a tie-down roper competing on the college circuit and the Rodeo Cowboy Association (later the Professional Rodeo Cowboys Association). They got married in 1950. The Yourees and Combs took off to rodeo full-time.

== Career ==
Combs Johnson was a five-time ARJA barrel racing champion. She was also a two-time ARJA all-around champion. When the first NFR was held in Dallas, Texas, Combs was one of the flag carriers in the opening ceremony. In 1980, Combs Johnson competed in her first West of the Pecos Rodeo. She split the win with Shanna Bush, but a coin toss gave the victory to Bush. In 1996, she competed in that rodeo for the last time, winning the title and buckle cleanly. At that time the Johnsons considered the rodeo a hometown one as they ranched nearby in Sydney. Combs Johnson is considered an innovator in her work writing rulebooks. She also served as an officer in many organizations, including the AQRJA and the WPRA. In 1991, she ran the barrels one last time at the NFR in Las Vegas, Nevada.

In 1962, Combs Johnson secured the World Champion honors for barrel racing, with the help of her horse, "Red." She also was a 12-time NFR qualifier from 1959 to 1991. Only Charmayne James holds more qualifications. Combs Johnson was a five-time junior barrel racing champion.

Combs Johnson's horse Star Plaudit, nicknamed "Red", was inducted into the ProRodeo Hall of Fame in 2017. In 1962, Red won two world championships and assisted in winning a third. One was in barrel racing and the other two were in steer wrestling. No other horse has accomplished this.

== Death ==
Combs Johnson died from complications of COPD on August 2, 2023, two weeks before her 85th birthday.

== Honors ==
- 1997 WPRA's Woman of the Year in 1997
- 1997 WPPR's Coca-Cola Woman of the Year
- 2005 Rodeo Hall of Fame of the National Cowboy & Western Heritage Museum
- 2015 Texas Rodeo Cowboy Hall of Fame
- 2023 ProRodeo Hall of Fame
