= Scamper (horse) =

ProRodeo Hall of Fame barrel racing horse

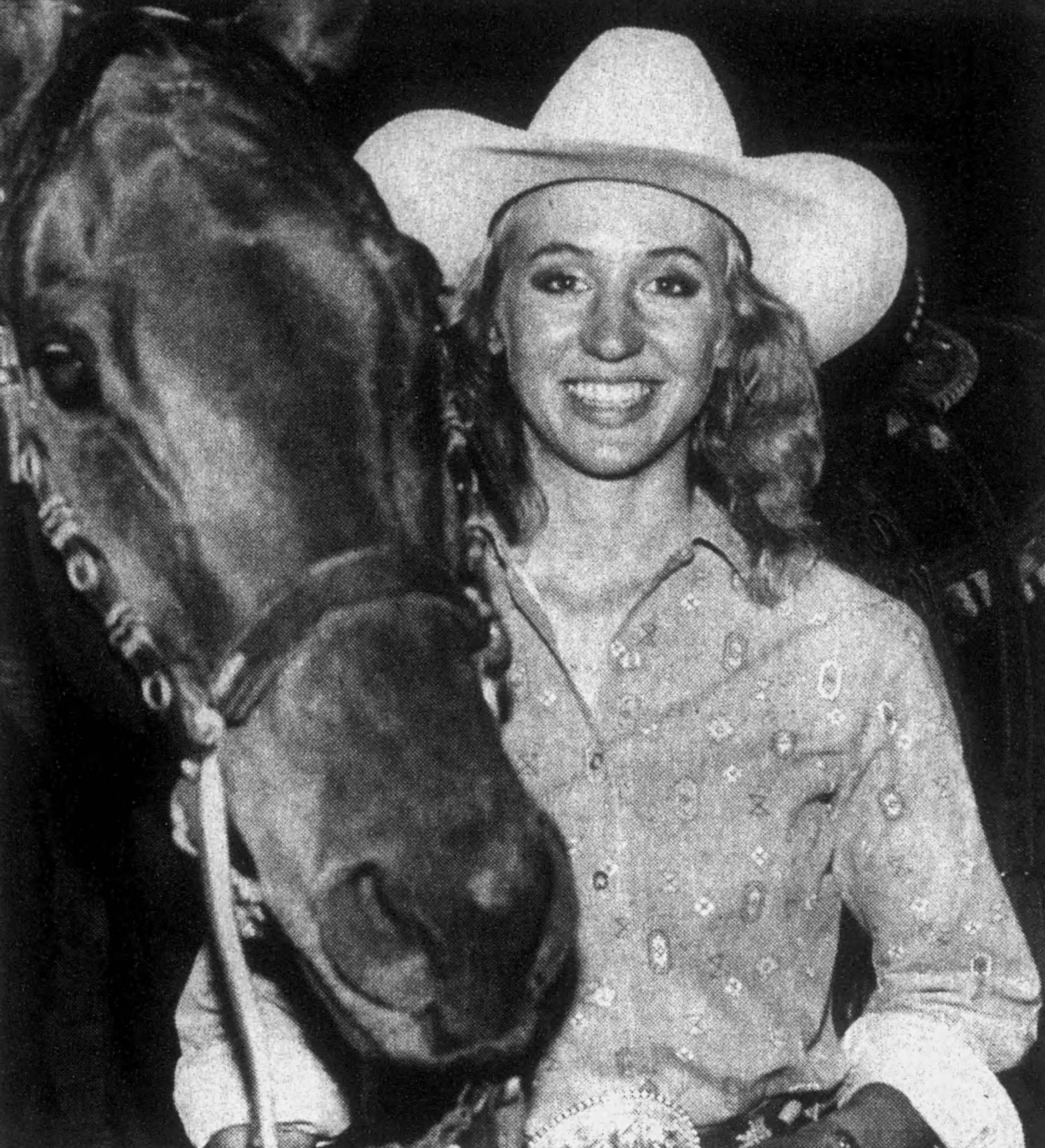
- Scamper and Charmayne James in 1988
- Breed: American Quarter Horse
- Discipline: Barrel racing
- Sire: Gills Sunny Boy
- Grandsire: Sonny Gill
- Dam: Draper's Jay
- Maternal grandsire: Headed West
- Sex: Gelding
- Foaled: 1977
- Died: July 4, 2012 (aged 34–35)
- Country: United States
- Color: Bay
- Breeder: Walter Merrick

Honors
- 1992 AQHA Silver Spur Award; 1996 Pro Rodeo Hall of Fame
- Last updated on: April 30, 2017.

Gills Bay Boy (1977 – July 4, 2012), nicknamed "Scamper", was a ProRodeo Hall of Fame timed-event horse notable for his success in barrel racing. His owner, Charmayne James, rode Scamper from 1984 to 1993 in the National Finals Rodeo (NFR). They won the Women's Professional Rodeo Association (WPRA) World Championship consecutively from 1984 through 1993. They won the NFR in 1984, 1986–87, 1989–90, and 1993. He is also the recipient of the 1992 American Quarter Horse Association Silver Spur Award. Both Scamper and James won many other championships, awards, and honors. After being retired from competition after last competing in 1993, he was cloned six years later. The clone, nicknamed "Clayton", has been kept a stallion and stands at stud. Scamper died on July 4, 2012, at the age of 35.

== Background ==
Scamper was a bay American Quarter Horse gelding foaled in 1977 and given the registered name Gills Bay Boy. Walter "Buddy" Draper raised Scamper in Wetmore, Colorado. The gelding could be tracked to Three Bars on his sire's side. When Scamper bucked Buddy off, sending him to the hospital, he sent the horse to an auction. Scamper was resold several times via auction before landing in the James family's feedlot in Clayton, New Mexico. Charmayne's father picked up the gelding from a cowboy who worked there, paying $1,100. One of the cowboys in the James' feedlot, Ron Holland, patiently retrained the horse so there were no issues with him any longer. They used Scamper to sort cattle; the horse was so nimble he excelled at it. However, Charmayne, had been searching quite some time for a replacement for her last barrel racing horse, Bardo, who had broken his leg, and appealed to her father for help. Her father then mentioned the little horse in his feedlot. He said the horse was "cold backed", so "do not lope him right off." Nonetheless, 12-year-old Charmayne took the horse where no could see him and loped him. The horse bucked a little, and she laughed. The horse looked at her, and Charmayne later stated that she felt the horse would not harm her. When she first started him running him around the barrels, he took right to it. When her father was watching, he commented, "He sure wants to scamper around those barrels", providing his nickname. Scamper was 4 years old when he started barrel racing. A couple weeks after James started running Scamper, they took their first win at a small playday.

== Professional career ==
In professional rodeo, the only women's event is barrel racing, which is the second most popular event in rodeo, after bull riding. Barrel racing is a timed event where horse and rider run a cloverleaf pattern around three preset barrels in the fastest time. The best times are obtained by running around each barrel as close as possible without touching it or knocking it over, which results in a five-second penalty added to total time. Winning times average between 13 and 15 seconds per round.

For a rodeo contestant to become a WPRA card holder, also referred to as "filling her permit," she must purchase a permit, then as a permit holder, earn a minimum dollar amount at sanctioned rodeos. Becoming a card holder allows the contestant to compete in final events and be officially ranked. In 1983, after competing in some local barrel races, James filled her permit for the WPRA following a win in a barrel racing competition at Dodge City, Kansas.

James believes Scamper hit his peak as a barrel racing horse around 1986–87; in his peak years, she said, "he dominated".

=== The first championships ===
In 1984, horse and rider were both striving to break into the professional rodeo circuit. James was 14 years old, and Scamper was 7 years old. Her bankroll was low, and her prize winnings were not yet enough to support her. Her father had decided she should be able to support herself in rodeo, or she would have to give it up. She managed to hit her stride at the San Antonio Stock Show & Rodeo. While first in the Joe Freeman Coliseum, she was taunted by some other racers to "go home". When experiencing this at previous rodeos, she had let these girls' remarks affect her motivation. That night, however, she was filled with determination. Scamper ran his best race, and they won. “I knew how he was going to run every day,” James said. “He knew he was loved, but he wasn't spoiled. He knew he had a purpose.” In 1984, James and Scamper won their first WPRA World Championship and their first NFR.

=== The bridleless win ===
In 1985 Scamper and James won the WPRA World Championship again. They also qualified for the NFR. Scamper won five go-rounds. They won a go-round They placed in some more go-rounds. This was the year that Scamper's bridle fell off on a "Friday the 13th" amidst the 7th go-round. James later explained there had been a concrete wall Scamper hit with his head, and the wall hit the top of a Chicago screw that held the headstall to the bit, loosening it. It fell off during the run, leaving the bit loose in his mouth. Because Scamper had already started running, and she didn't see any way of stopping him at that point, they finished the pattern.

Photographer Kenneth Springer witnessed the moment when Scamper's bridle fell off. He related that "Charmayne’s focus was on keeping that bit in Scamper’s mouth for as long as she possibly could. When he finally spit it out while turning the third barrel, she went to the bat. I don’t think anyone would have predicted her to do that. Most people would have been thinking about how to get stopped at that point, and she goes for a go round win.". In 1986, they won the average. Winning the average that year paid $11,484. Winning the average is when the contestant has the best aggregate score when they have competed in more than one round.

=== Uniqueness ===
James has related what made Scamper so extraordinary:

He had the speed and the turn. He was so smooth, but he proved his speed to me at times when he would get by the first barrel a stride and have to make up for it and still win the rodeo by two tenths. I remember one year at the rodeo in Molalla, Ore., we got by the first barrel a little, came out of the second at a really funny angle and made a big swoop going to the third barrel, and with tons of mistakes, he won it by three tenths... The cool thing with Scamper is that some horses are ratey and some are free runners, and he had the perfect combination of both styles. Even when he ran all out, he always turned and worked. I never had to second-guess or worry if he was going to work or not. He also excelled in big arenas and harder type ground, which made him awesome at the rodeos

=== The last championships ===
There were other notable horses riding the barrels during Scamper's competition years, such as McRae's Dutch Watch and Deb Mohon's Brown. However, Scamper always pulled through the win. Part of it was his consistency. In 1989, as the NFR was starting, Scamper had a cut on his coronet band. The cut was pretty foul and had kept Scamper from his normal conditioning routine. It was taking Scamper some go-rounds to warmed up. According to James, rodeo announcer Bob Tallman approached her and said "'Well darlin’, we all knew this day would come,' meaning an end to our streak of world titles. I thought to myself, 'No, it hasn't ended yet.' Everyone had written us off that year, but we went out and did our best and kept trying our hardest and came away with the championship

In 1993, James and Scamper qualified for the NFR again and had a 10th WPRA World Championship title they were shooting for. James was feeling anxious with the pressure of that title. She wanted to retire Scamper undefeated and still at his best. After the NFR was over, James felt a great deal of relief at having accomplished that.

== Retirement ==
According to James, Scamper wasn't always the perfect horse:

There were years when Scamper struggled to keep his lead, and there were extenuating circumstances that people didn’t see or know about, but he always came through. A major factor to his success was keeping him conditioned and sound with a lot of physical therapy. I breezed him quite a bit, and at times, when he had respiratory issues from hauling, we used oxygen to overcome it. One myth about Scamper is that people assumed when I gave him oxygen treatments that he was being drugged instead. The ironic thing is that drug testing in rodeo was implemented when Scamper was running. He was just good.

With Scamper's assistance, James became the first $1 million professional cowgirl in 1990. The two ended up winning the WPRA World Championship every year from 1984 to 1993. They won a record 10 straight WPRA World Championships. They won multiple NFR World Championships. Scamper was semi-retired from competition in 1993 before being fully retired a few years later. For example, he competed at one of his favorite rodeos, Rodeo Houston, in March 1996 where he won $8,000. Scamper died on July 4, 2012, at the age of 35 and was laid to rest at James' ranch in Boerne, Texas.

Scamper was honored in 1992 with the AQHA Silver Spur Award which is only awarded to quarter horses who bring attention and recognition to the breed. Scamper is the first barrel horse inducted into the ProRodeo Hall of Fame in Colorado Springs, Colorado, in 1996. In 2017, the ProRodeo Hall of Fame announced its inductees for the year and they included another timed-event horse, barrel racing horse, Star Plaudit (Red), so Scamper will no longer be the sole barrel racing horse in the hall.

== Awards and honors ==
=== Awards ===
- 1984–89, 1991–93 Rodeo Houston champion
- 1992 Calgary Stampede champion
- 1992–93 Crown Royal season winner
- 1988 Calgary Olympics, Gold Medal Team
- 1987 Coors Barrel Racing champion
- 1986 Turquoise Circuit champion
- 1985-091 Coors Chute Out champion
- 1986 Winston Series champion
- 1985–86 Winston Pro Tour champion
- 1984–87, 90 Wrangler Series champion
- 1984–86 1988–91, 93 Dodge Series champion
- 1991 Crown Royal season winner
- 1991 Wrangler World of Rodeo champion
- 1989–91 AQHA Horse of the Year
- 1989, 91 Sierra Circuit champion
- 1990 Copenhagen/Skoal Series champion
- 1984, 86-87 89–90, 93 NFR champion
- 1984–93 WPRA World Champion

=== Honors ===
- 2011 Texas Rodeo Cowboy Hall of Fame
- 1998 Ellensburg Rodeo Hall of Fame
- 1996 ProRodeo Hall of Fame
- 1992 AQHA Silver Spur Award
- WPRA's Horse With the Most Heart in 1986, 1988–93

== Endorsements and Clayton ==
A feed company once endorsed James and Scamper, renaming a feed after the horse. Because he was a gelding and as such cannot reproduce, James made the decision to clone Scamper. James researched cloning for about six years prior to making a decision. She chose ViaGen, an animal genetics corporation based in Austin, Texas. ViaGen is a commercial cloning company who charged $150,000 to perform the procedure.

The ensuing foal, nicknamed Clayton, was born in 2006. He was kept a stallion and now stands at stud. Because the AQHA does not accept cloned animals for registry, Clayton and his offspring cannot be registered. However, breed registration is not required for horses to compete in barrel racing or other rodeo events.

== See also ==
- List of historical horses
