= Florence Youree =

American barrel racer

Florence Youree (born April 19, 1933) is a ProRodeo Hall of Fame cowgirl. She assisted in getting barrel racing into the National Finals Rodeo (NFR), which only had men's events at the time.

== Life ==
Florence Youree was born Florence Price on April 19, 1933, in Duncan, Oklahoma. Youree and her sister, Sherry Price Combs Johnson, grew up outside Addington, Oklahoma. They practiced musical chair races on horseback. When they discovered barrel racing, they started practicing right away. Florence married Dale Youree, a calf roper, in 1950. They went on the road and brought her sister along. She won the girl's all-around title in 1966. Her sister, Sherry, won the barrel racing world championship in 1962. Sherry's horse, Star Plaudit, was inducted into the ProRodeo Hall of Fame. Youree's granddaughter, Janae Ward, won the barrel racing world championship in 2003.

== Career ==
Youree spent significant time promoting the sport of barrel racing. Under the hands of Youree and other women, it became a standardized event in rodeo. She also participated in bringing the Girls Rodeo Association (GRA) to a nationally-sized organization. Youree and her husband organized the Barrel Futurities of America, the Oklahoma Youth Rodeo Association, and the Youree Horsemanship Camps.

Youree was the director of the GRA. From 1960 to 1964, she was the president. She was also the secretary-treasurer, from where she contributed the most. During this period, she spent time trying to get barrel racing included at the NFR. First, she presented the idea to the Rodeo Cowboys Association. They liked the idea, but they allowed it to be decided by the people in Oklahoma City. In the spring of 1967, Youree had wrangled meetings with Stan Draper and then Clem McSpadden, the general manager. This sealed the deal.

As a competitor, Youree was in the top 15 six times. She won the all-around title in 1966.

=== Honors ===
Youree was inducted into the National Cowgirl Museum and Hall of Fame in 1996. She was inducted into the Rodeo Hall of Fame of the National Cowboy & Western Heritage Museum in 2009.
