= Mildred Farris =

American barrel racer and rodeo secretary

- Occupation: Rodeo competitor
- Discipline: Barrel racing
- Born: August 8, 1933; Andrews, Texas, US
- Died: May 13, 2013 (aged 79); Addington, Oklahoma US

Honors
- 1994 Sul Ross Rodeo Hall of Fame; 2004 Texas Rodeo Cowboy Hall of Fame; 2006 ProRodeo Hall of Fame; 2010 Rodeo Hall of Fame of the National Cowboy & Western Heritage Museum; 2012 National Cowgirl Museum and Hall of Fame

Mildred Farris (August 8, 1933 – May 13, 2013) is a ProRodeo Hall of Fame inductee, who was inducted with her husband John.

== Life ==
Mildred Farris was born Mildred Lois Cotten in Andrews, Texas, on August 8, 1933. She worked on her father's cattle ranch. She graduated from Sul Ross State University in Alpine, Texas, with a B.A. in Physical Education in 1955. She attended a rodeo reunion where she met John Farris, and the two were married in May 1955.

== Career ==
Farris was a five-time National Finals Rodeo (NFR) secretary. She was also a five-time NFR assistant secretary. She was an eight-time Professional Rodeo Cowboys Association (PRCA) Secretary of the Year. She was a PRCA Contract Personnel Executive Council from 1988 to 2002. She carried the American flag at the NFR opening in Oklahoma City, Oklahoma, for 17 years. She qualified for the NFR 12 times as a barrel racer. She served as the Girls Rodeo Association (GRA) director and also served as director when it was renamed the Women's Professional Rodeo Association (WPRA). She also served as its vice-president, and president from 1965 to 1971.

From 1955 to 1957, Farris was the Texas Barrel Racing Association's champion. She was the runner-up to the barrel racing world champion at the NFR in 1959, 1960, and 1969. In 1968, she ran the fastest time at the NFR. She also served as secretary to many producers including Tommy Steiner, Harper and Morgan, Neal Gay, the Fort Worth Stock Show and others.

She also served as the secretary for the Dodge (now RAM) Texas Circuit Finals for 17 years. She was the WPRA Woman of the Year in 1996 and the WPRA Secretary of the Year in 1998.

== Honors ==
- 1994 Sul Ross Rodeo Hall of Fame
- 2004 Texas Rodeo Cowboy Hall of Fame
- 2010 Rodeo Hall of Fame of the National Cowboy & Western Heritage Museum
- 2012 National Cowgirl Museum and Hall of Fame

== Death ==
Farris died on May 13, 2013, in Addington, Oklahoma.
