= Billie McBride =

American barrel racer (1927-2017)

- Occupation: Rodeo competitor
- Discipline: Barrel racing
- Born: March 4, 1927; Copperas Cove, Texas, US
- Died: May 10, 2017 (aged 90); San Angelo, Texas, US

Billie McBride (March 4, 1927 – May 10, 2017) was inducted into the ProRodeo Hall of Fame for barrel racing in 2018. She won the barrel racing world championship title four times.

== Life ==
Billie McBride was born Billie Hinson on March 4, 1927, in Copperas Cove, Texas. In 1937, McBride witnessed a barrel racing event at a rodeo at 10 years old. From then on, she wanted to be a barrel racer.

== Career ==
About 10 years later, the Girls Rodeo Association (now the Women's Professional Rodeo Association) was established in her hometown of San Angelo, Texas, and she joined, becoming a charter member. She became the association's first star by competing almost exclusively in barrel racing. For the latter half of the 1950s, she reigned over the event. The GRA was formed by women who competed in multiple events such as tie-down roping and roughstock. McBride tried her hand at roping momentarily. However, she returned to barrel racing and dominated it. She won the reserve championship in 1954, then won four straight championships, all on her horse Zombie. The record stood until Charmayne James broke it 1988.

McBride also held several leadership roles in the GRA. For 13 years she held roles that included the president, vice president, and secretary roles. She was part of the team of ladies who attempted to get the barrel racing included as part of the National Finals Rodeo and produced by the Rodeo Cowboys Association (now the Professional Rodeo Cowboys Association). However, she was successful in getting them a spot in the National Finals Steer Roping for the women which made the way for the barrel racing to join the NFR eight years later.

She was a four-time barrel racing world champion. In December 1955, 1956, 1957, and 1958, she won said world title.

== Death and legacy ==
She was inducted into the National Cowgirl Hall of Fame in 1980.

Her horse "Zombie A" was inducted into the Texas Rodeo Cowboy Hall of Fame in 2012.

McBride died at 90 years old on May 10, 2017, in San Angelo, Texas.
