= Pam Minick =

American television personality

Pamela "Pam" Minick (née Martin; born June 30, 1953) is an American rodeo and western-lifestyle television personality.

== Life ==
Pam Minick and her sister were raised on a ranch of five acres of land in Las Vegas, Nevada. The family had no horses at first. When Minick was nine and her sister was seven, they decided they wanted some horses to ride. After their mother acquired two Palomino horses for them, they learned to ride at the local 4-H.

== Career ==
Minick was Miss Rodeo America in 1973. She was the Women's Professional Rodeo Association (WPRA) World Champion breakaway roper in 1982. She also qualified for the Women's National Finals Rodeo in team roping. Minick still competes in barrel racing and team roping. She qualified for the Women's National Finals Rodeo 11 times. She is a rodeo sports commentator. She has been a commentator or interviewer in over 1,000 shows. These include rodeo, equestrian, and country music shows. In 1992, Minick co-announced for the major rodeo the Houston Livestock Show and Rodeo, becoming the first women to announce a major professional rodeo.

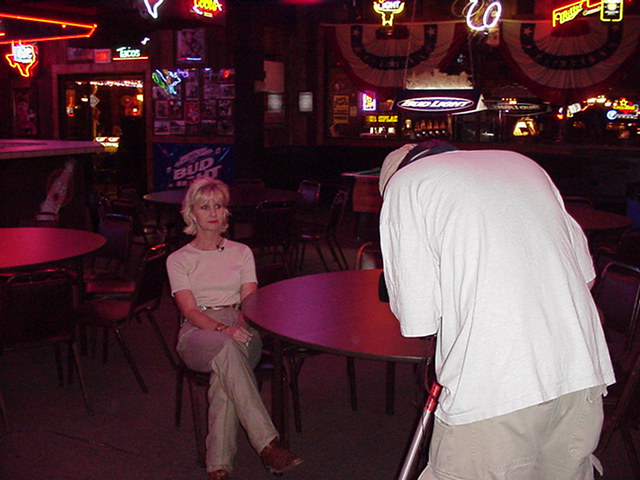
Minick (left) being interviewed in 2022 for an episode of North Texas Explorer

She and her husband Billy are part owners of Billy Bob's Texas, known nationally as the "World's Largest Honky Tonk" and is located in the Fort Worth Stockyards in Fort Worth, Texas. Minick held the position of marketing director for over 25 years; she also acted as the face of the venue.

Minick also has a television and film career. She is an actress in both television and movies. She also has served as the president of the WPRA. Minick's popularity in all her roles increased attendance in the sport.

== Personal ==
Minick married her husband Billy on May 29, 1983. They live on a ranch in Argyle, Texas. She is the stepmother to Billy's four children from a previous marriage; Cheyenne, Cody (deceased), Brandy and Concho, as well as the step-grandmother to his five grandchildren. Pam's Las Vegas birth announcements always describe her as "Atomic Blonde".

== Honors ==
- 1992 Coca-Cola Woman of the Year Award
- 1994 Lane Frost Award
- 1998 National Cowboy & Western Heritage Museum Tad Lucas Award
- 2000 National Cowgirl Museum and Hall of Fame
- 2004 Texas Cowboy Hall of Fame
- 2006 Great Woman of Texas Award
- 2011 Texas Trail of Fame
- 2011 Texas Rodeo Cowboy Hall of Fame
- 2016 Western Horseman Award
- 2017 National Multicultural Western Heritage Museum and Hall of Fame
- 2022 Great Women of Texas Legend Award
- 2025 PBR Jim Shoulders Lifetime Achievement Award
- 2025 ProRodeo Hall of Fame
- 2025 Legend of ProRodeo
