= Jim Bob (disambiguation) =

Jim Bob may refer to:

- Jim Bob Altizer (1932–1997), American rodeo cowboy
- Jim Bob Bizzell (born 1985), American paralympian
- Jim Bob Cooter (born 1984), American football coach
- Jim Bob Duggar (born 1965), American politician and television personality
- Jim Bob Floyd (born 1929), American musician
- Jim Bob Helduser (1957–2010), American football coach
- Jim Bob Morris (born 1961), American football player
- "Jim Bob" Morrison, singer of Carter the Unstoppable Sex Machine
- Jim Bob Taylor (born 1959), American football player
