= Martha Josey =

American barrel racer

- Birth name: Martha Lavaughn Arthur
- Occupation: Rodeo competitor
- Discipline: Barrel racing
- Born: March 11, 1938 (age 88); Gregg County, Texas
- Major wins/Championships: 1980 Women’s Professional Rodeo Association (WPRA) Barrel Racing World Champion; 1997 National Barrel Horse Association (NBHA) Senior World Champion
- Lifetime achievements: Dennis D. High Lifestyle Achievements Award; Women's Sports Foundation AQHA Female Equestrian of the Year

Honors
- 1985 National Cowgirl Museum and Hall of Fame; 2002 Texas Cowboy Hall of Fame; 2007 Texas Rodeo Cowboy Hall of Fame; 2011 Rodeo Hall of Fame; 2020 ProRodeo Hall of Fame

Significant horses
- CeBe Reed; Sonny Bit O'Both; Jetonfer Pay; Swen Sir Bug, aka "J.C."; Mr. Revolution Bars; Orange Smash; Joe B Jammin; Red Man Bay

Martha Josey (born Martha Lavaughn Arthur in Gregg County, Texas, on March 11, 1938, daughter of Robert Jonas Arthur, Sr. and the former Martha James) is an American professional rodeo cowgirl who specializes in barrel racing. She has been in active rodeo competition since 1964. She won the Girls Rodeo Association (GRA) barrel racing world championship in 1980 and was the last barrel racer to win a world championship under the organization's former name before it was renamed the Women's Professional Rodeo Association (WPRA) in 1981. She has earned numerous other titles at competitions such as the National Finals Rodeo (NFR) and events sanctioned by the National Barrel Horse Association (NBHA) and WPRA. She also competed in barrel racing as an exhibition event during the 1988 Calgary Olympics, and is the founder and co-owner of the Josey Ranch Barrel Racing Clinic.

== Early years ==
Josey is originally from the Kilgore/Marshall, Texas area. Her love for horses was instilled by her father, who was one of the first directors for the American Quarter Horse Association (AQHA), and she began riding on a pony at a very early age. At age 10, Josey experienced the loss of a parent when her father died due to a heart attack. Josey's mother rented her land for oil for 25,000 dollars so that Martha could buy a gelding named CeBe Reed. After attending a rodeo in her teens, Josey became inspired to compete in the sport and began to work with CeBe Reed as a barrel racing horse.

Martha married R.E. Josey in 1967. R.E. Josey died on February 24, 2022.

== Career ==
Her first barrel horse, CeBe Reed, took her to 52 consecutive wins, and the awards she was given included seven horse trailers. Josey and CeBe competed in the National Finals Rodeo (NFR) in 1968 and 1969, winning $3,421 in prize money in 1969. Josey claims this horse is the reason she was able to quit her job and go pro.

Her second horse, Sonny Bit O'Both, brought her to the NFR four consecutive years (1978-1981). Sonny is the only horse in history to win both the AQHA and the WPRA championships in the same year. In 1980, she won the barrel racing world championship at the NFR, the highest title in professional barrel racing.

With the horse Jetonfer Pay, Josey won the Pro Tour Circuit in 1985, went to the NFR again, and was inducted into the National Cowgirl Museum and Hall of Fame.

Josey and Swen Sir Bug, aka "J.C.", competed in the 1987 NFR. At the 1988 Winter Olympics held in Calgary, Alberta, she participated in a barrel racing exhibition as an Olympic special event where she and J.C. earned a gold medal.

Her next horse, Mr. Revolution Bars, accompanied her to the 1989 and 1990 NFR, making her one of only two barrel racers to ever compete in the NFR in four consecutive decades. After that, Orange Smash carried her to a championship in the NBHA Senior World Championship 1997 and to the NFR in 1998.

In 1999, she was received the Dennis D. High Lifestyle Achievements Award and was chosen as the Women's Sports Foundation AQHA Female Equestrian of the Year. In addition, Orange Smash received 1999 AQHA "Best of America's Horse Award" and was created as a model horse by Peter Stone.

In 2000, she entered her fifth decade of competition with the horse, Joe B Jammin, and in that year ran the fastest time at the Lone Star Finals. They went on to be the Go Round Winner at the 2001 Copenhagen Cup Finale in Dallas, Texas. In 2002, she placed first and second in the NBHA Holiday Classic in Jackson, Mississippi, riding Joe B. Jammin and Sweet Sailin' Six, and 2003 ended with a championship in the Equus America competition in Houston, Texas, as well as a reserve championship in the AQHA World rodeo event in Oklahoma City, Oklahoma. In 2004, she obtained Red Man Bay, and the pair won the 2004 NBHA Holiday Classic Sr. 1 D Championship in Jackson, Mississippi, and went on to win the 2004 and 2005 NBHA Sr. Division Reserve World Championships. In March 2004, Josey suffered a serious accident at a rodeo in Austin, Texas. Doctors discovered two skull fractures, a broken pelvis, six broken ribs, and a punctured lung. Though told she might not walk again and certainly never ride, she proved her doctors wrong. She worked out daily in the swimming pool with the help of her husband, and regained enough strength to not only ride again, but also to compete professionally. After her accident, however, Josey became a strong advocate of equestrian helmet use and endorses Troxel riding helmets and safety gear. As of 2009, Josey was still competing in barrel racing.

== Business enterprises ==
Presently, Martha Josey resides in Karnack, Texas, where she owns the Josey Ranch. She trains and markets barrel-racing and roping horses. At the ranch, and at various other places around the United States, Josey, along with "The Josey Team" of previous students, holds clinics for aspiring barrel racers and calf ropers to improve their skills and learn more about these events. The Josey Clinic was the first barrel-racing clinic in the sport, and has assisted thousands of riders over a 40-year period. As of 2010, Josey claims a total of 80,000 student have passed through her clinics and ranch competitions. However, it is unclear how this figure was calculated. The Josey Ranch sponsors several competitions, including the Josey Jr. World Championship Barrel Race for youth age 20 and under and the Josey Reunion Round-Up.

Martha Josey has also recorded several videos, written books, and has appeared in magazines such as Western Horseman. Both R.E. and Martha have also had television appearances on ESPN, RFD-TV, and other networks. In addition, the Joseys have had a substantial number of product endorsements, many of which Josey sells at the Josey Western Store and online mail-order shop, headquartered from their ranch.

== Books authored ==
- World Champion Martha Josey's Running to Win: How to Win at Barrel Racing Both Inside and Out (Paperback - Jul 1985)
- Fundamentals of Barrel Racing (Paperback - Jan 1, 1977)
- Riding the Gymkhana Winner (Farmam Horse Library Series) (Paperback - Nov 1972)

== Honors ==
- 1985 National Cowgirl Museum and Hall of Fame
- 2002 Texas Cowboy Hall of Fame with her husband, R.E. Josey
- 2007 Texas Rodeo Cowboy Hall of Fame with her husband
- 2011 Rodeo Hall of Fame of the National Cowboy & Western Heritage Museum
- 2020 ProRodeo Hall of Fame

== Other sources ==
- 2021 WPRA NFR Media Guide | Barrel Racing World Champions 1948 - 2020. Women's Professional Rodeo Association. Archived from the original on April 12, 2022.
