= Ann Lewis (barrel racer) =

American barrel racer (1958-1968)

Ann Lewis (June 4, 1958 – October 2, 1968) was an American barrel racer. In December 1968, she won the barrel racing world championship posthumously, becoming the youngest barrel racing champion in the Girls Rodeo Association (now the Women's Professional Rodeo Association).

== Life ==
Ann Lewis was born on June 4, 1958, in Sulphur, Oklahoma.

== Career ==
Lewis was running barrels before she even started school. When she was five, she placed in her first open. She also won her first prize money at five when she competed in Atoka, Oklahoma. She was unable to sign her name to the receipt but offered to print it. Ann had a twin sister, Jan; they were seven when their parents got them their first barrel racing horse. When Lewis was eight, she was consistently winning ahead of more accomplished racers. She was often referred to as "Annie the Okie".

In 1967, an eight-year-old, self-starter, Lewis and her partially feral bay horse Charlie Bay Dan starting winning amateur rodeos throughout the Midwest.

Lewis turned professional in March 1968, her rookie year, before the GRA instituted a minimum age requirement. She had no issues signing her name for a prize check in February; a check for $1,064 in Houston, Texas. She promptly handed the check to her father, turned away and then back to ask for money for an ice cream cone. Lewis was finding herself the queen of the GRA as she kept winning more rodeos. In Shreveport, Louisiana, Lewis and Charlie Bay Dan set an arena record. They ran the barrels in 16 seconds flat and 15.8 seconds flat. They also won the average.

By August, she was in first place for the world championship. Nine-time NFR qualifier Sissy Thurman, who was 34, was in second place. Lewis won $8,928 total for 1968, despite not attending the NFR. Her year-end total beat the second place Kay Whitaker by $656. Sissy Thurman won third place posthumously with $6,311 in total year winnings.

== Death ==
Lewis' family and fellow barrel racer Sissy Thurman were headed from a rodeo in Little Rock, Arkansas, to rodeo slack in Waco, Texas. On October 2, 1968, at 1:15 a.m, the Lewis vehicle rammed into an overturned 18-wheeler. The wreck killed Thurman, Ann and her twin Jan, and Ann's mother Rose, along with two barrel horses.

== Honors ==
Lewis was awarded the 1968 barrel racing world championship following her death. She won the Youngest NFR Qualifier at ten years, six months, old in 1968.

In 1981, Lewis was inducted into the National Cowgirl Museum and Hall of Fame.
