= V-61 (bull) =

American bucking bull

- V-61 in 1970
- Breed: Brahma
- Sex: Bull
- Born: 1962
- Died: 1974 (aged 11–12)
- Nationality: United States
- Owners: Billy Minick Rodeo Company, Sloan Williams, Rudy Vela
- Weight: 1800 lb (820 kg)
- Appearance: Gray with Jersey Colored Head
- Awards: 1970 Bull of the NFR

V-61 (c. 1962–1974) was an American bucking bull. He competed in the Rodeo Cowboys Association (RCA) circuit. In 1970, he was the Bull of the National Finals Rodeo (NFR). In 2012, the Texas Rodeo Cowboy Hall of Fame inducted V-61. In 2015, the Bull Riding Hall of Fame inducted him into its inaugural class. In 930 attempts, only four bull riders managed to complete rides on him for a total of five qualified rides. His owner retired him in January 1974 and he died later that year.

== Background and early career ==
V-61 was likely born in 1962 based on a veterinarian's estimation of his age in 1971 to be nine years old. A Texas rancher named Rudy Vela bought the weaned, juvenile bull V-61 at a beef cattle sale of cows that had been culled into categories of "canners and cutters". Apparently, V-61 had been an orphan calf and bottle-raised. Vela deemed the bull more suited to bucking than to be raised for beef since he never outgrew the "funny quirks" Vela felt all orphan calves possess. He branded the junior bull on the hip and raised him to adulthood. V-61 also was unsuitable for breeding since he was unregistered. Due to these considerations, Vela sold the young bull for rodeo stock. While Vela owned V-61, he never bucked the bull. He did, however, tie a dummy on his back a few times. Every time V-61 sent that dummy flying before the requisite eight seconds was up.

In 1968, Harry Knight was looking to retire as a stock contractor, and he was offering his rodeo company for sale. Billy Minick was interested because Knight had good bucking stock, so he purchased Knight's Rodeo Company and renamed it the Billy Minick Rodeo Company. The following year, Sloan Williams was providing Billy Minick with calves for rodeo calf roping events. Williams owned V-61 at that time, having bought him from Vela. Sloan pressed Minick about buying the bull, saying, "No one will get on him any more at our rodeos, he's such a hard bucker. I'm hauling him for nothing. Would you like him?" Minick and his father drove a trailer to Williams' ranch in Hungerford, Texas, to collect V-61 and another bull. After Minick bought V-61, and he started bucking the bull on the Rodeo Cowboys Association (RCA) circuit, V-61 quickly became known as an unrideable bull.

None of his owners ever named V-61; he had a brand on his hip and that was how he became known. His sire was claimed to be a Brahma bull, and his dam was a Jersey cow. V-61's head was Jersey-colored, and the rest of him was generally gray. He weighed 1,800 pounds (820 kg). When the Velas were inducted into the Texas Rodeo Cowboy Hall of Fame, Minick took the opportunity to confirm that V-61 was definitely raised on a bottle.

=== RCA ===
For his debut in the RCA in 1969, at the National Finals Rodeo (NFR), every bucking bull was bucked two times, except V-61, who was bucked three times. He bucked off all three of his riders.

In 1970, his first full season in the RCA, he bucked off all 23 riders who drew him that year. At the NFR in that year, he was named RCA Bull of the NFR. Bud Yale of Fort Worth, Texas, who always tied the flank strap on the bull, related that V-61 always left the chutes quickly. "He would sense when the gate was about to open and would draw up and get ready to make that big jump out." Yale said. "When the gate opened, he'd bale out of there and kick like you wouldn't believe."

He bucked off three riders in the finals that year. He bucked off Bobby Berger, Sandy Kirby, and bucked off and severely injured Dicky Cox, who had to spend several days in the hospital. The bull gained such a reputation that Life Magazine featured him in the same issue when Muhammed Ali appeared on the cover. Life traveled to Cheyenne Frontier Days especially for the story. The feature appeared in the October 23, 1970, issue of the magazine.

In early 1971, in San Angelo, Texas, RCA world champion bull rider Freckles Brown drew V-61. At the time, Brown was 50 years old. Minick was concerned about the match because of Brown's age and because V-61 bucked so hard. However, his fears were allayed when the bull left the chute "like a milk cow" and dumped Brown in about six seconds by dropping a shoulder.

In 1971, at Cheyenne Frontier Days, in Cheyenne, Wyoming, Rodney Nelson was competing at amateur bronc riding. He stayed to watch the bull riding because multiple hall of famer Myrtis Dightman had drawn V-61. Dightman had said he would be able to ride the bull, but Minick was skeptical. While Minick watched Dightman prepare in the chute, he said, "I watched him pull his rope tight, then he let the rope off a little, then he pulled it tight again. When the chute opened Dightman went off the bull in a very few seconds." Nelson related that V-61 jumped out of the chute with Dightman on top and dispatched him in a couple jumps that even a horse might have trouble matching.

=== Ride heard around the world ===
On June 6, 1971, in Gladewater, Texas, at the Gladewater Round-Up Rodeo, V-61 met his match. Future bull riding world champion John Quintana rode him for the first time and scored a high score of 94 points. Quintana later rode the bull again that year. Quintana was later inducted into the ProRodeo Hall of Fame. Minick once admitted that Quintana was the man he thought might be able to ride his bull. Later on, amateur bronc rider Roddy Nelson was talking to North Dakota rodeo legend Duane Howard about V-61. He inquired of Howard as to whether he had witnessed the ride. "I judged that rodeo," Duane said. "It was awesome! The noise from the crowd was so loud there was no way anyone could hear the whistle, but I had timed the ride on my stopwatch and knew John had conquered him!" The score only stood for a year; several riders broke the highest score record in the 1970s, including Quintana.

At the time, V-61 had been attempted 466 times in the RCA and several hundred times in amateur rodeos, and was as yet unridden. "After Quintana rode the bull three or four jumps and it began to look like he was going to ride him, the crowd started cheering and to their feet" fan Ralph Lane said. Lane added, "I remember Billy Minick throwing his feet down and hollering. 'He didn't make! He didn't make it!" However, two judges said otherwise: Quintana had made it to the eight-second mark.

Quintana's score of 94 on that ride was the highest score ever recorded at that time in a bucking stock event. Minick was disappointed that V-61's unridden streak was broken. Tommy Morse, a Gladewater rodeo organizer who saw Quintana's ride, said, "It seemed the longer he rode him, the higher the bull jumped. It was a ride heard around the world."

=== Illness ===
In August 1971, a nine-year-old V-61 had a hematoma of the spermatic vessel. Minick took the bull to see Dr. W.A. Aanes at Colorado State University in Fort Collins, Colorado. They operated on the bull, and the surgery went well despite concerns about its potential hazards. V-61 became a popular patient during his stay. Since Dr. Aanes was friendly with Paul Harvey, the well-known radio announcer, for the duration of the bull's stay Harvey reported on his condition. In September, V-61 returned home to recuperate under doctor's orders until the NFR.

=== Others who scored a ride ===
In 1971, at the NFR held in Oklahoma City, Oklahoma, V-61 was ridden for a qualified ride by Bobby Berger, who made the requisite eight seconds and scored 79 points. Berger won the round due to that ride. Bill Nelson drew the bull in the 10th round and bucked off.

In May 1972, bull rider Andy Taylor drew the bull. At this time, the dirt happened to be very deep in the arena, which "is tough on roughstock to really get a good buc". So Taylor left the chute and rode V-61 for a qualified ride. To Minick's dismay, Taylor then fanned the bull with his hat, which Minick perceived as impacting the bull's reputation. He told Taylor, "As good as that bull has been for this business, you didn't have to do that!"

In 1972, at the NFR, John Dodd drew V-61 in the first round, and V-61 bucked him off. Hall of famer Phil Lyne drew V-61 in the sixth round, made a qualified ride and scored 70 points. Ronnie Bowman also rode V-61, winning the 2nd round at the Fort Worth stock show in 1973.

=== Last ride ===
Minick had thought to retire V-61 after the 1972 NFR. But then Bob Watt, who ran the Fort Worth Stock Show and Rodeo, asked Minick to buck him one last time before retiring him. Minick acquiesced. Upon the draw, Andy Taylor had drawn V-61. Minick took care of V-61 to be sure he was loosened up. Minick said, "I was on the chutes, and when V-61 bucked Taylor off, I threw my hat out across the arena." In January 1974, Minick retired V-61 after his performance in Fort Worth.

V-61 completed his career with 930 attempted rides and only five qualified rides, a rare accomplishment for a bull. Those qualified rides were two by John Quintana, one by Bobby Berger, one by Phil Lyne, and one by Andy Taylor.

== Retirement and honors ==
V-61 died later in 1974. After his death, Minick framed the brand from V-61's left hip and had his head mounted. The mounted head hung in Billy Bob's Texas, owned by Minick, for many years before being moved to his ranch, and later to his log cabin home in Roanoke, Texas. As Minick said, “Every stock contractor wants to have one great one, and V-61 was mine.”

In 1996, the Gladewater Round-Up rodeo committee, who routinely honors rodeo notables, gave Minick silver spurs to honor V-61. Then, in 2010, they gave Minick the original white chute gate #3, with the statistics of the ride "Quintana vs. V61, 94 points" branded on it. Minick displayed the chute at Billy Bob's Texas for many years. It is now on display at the Bull Riding Hall of Fame in Cowtown Coliseum in the Fort Worth Stockyards in Fort Worth, Texas. The Bull Riding Hall of Fame started inducting honorees in 2015. In June each year, the chute is returned to the rodeo in Gladewater, Texas, for display. The Texas Rodeo Cowboy Hall of Fame inducted V-61 in 2012. The Bull Riding Hall of Fame inducted V-61 in their inaugural class in 2015.

Minick owns scrapbooks containing clippings and art of V-61, including a photograph of the bull jumping approximately four feet off the ground with Myrtis Dightman riding him.
