= Jimmie Gibbs Munroe =

American barrel racer

Jimmie Gibbs Munroe (born April 15, 1952) is a ProRodeo Hall of Fame barrel racer inductee in 2019. She is also the granddaughter of Zack Miller of the renowned Miller Brothers 101 Wild West Show. In addition, she also served in many positions on the Women's Professional Rodeo Association (WPRA) and helped advanced many causes for women competitors.

== Life ==
Jimmie Gibbs Munroe was born Jimmie Gibbs on April 15, 1952, in Clifton, Texas. Munroe was 3 when she rode in her first horse show. She was 10 when she competed in her first rodeo. In 1980, she married another rodeo hall of fame inductee, Dan "Bud" Munroe, and they have one daughter whom they named Tassie.

== Career ==
In addition to being a hall of fame barrel racer, she is also a barrel racing world champion in the Women's Professional Rodeo Association (WPRA). In December 1975, she won the championship at the National Finals Rodeo (NFR) in Oklahoma City, Oklahoma.

=== Horse ===
Munroe rode her horse registered name Robin Flit Bar, nicknamed Billy, when she won the world barrel racing championship. She says that her mother is responsible for finding this horse who changed her life. Billy is a bay gelding by Flit Bar and out of Robin Hood Price who is a daughter of Osage Bob. Munroe purchased Billy as a two-year-old. Naturally, he was athletically gifted, but Munroe also said he had a big heart. He was an encouragement to her.

=== Summary ===
Munroe has two National NIRA Barrel Racing titles. She has one National NIRA All-Around title. She has three Women's Professional Rodeo Association (WPRA) titles: barrel racing, all-around, and tie-down roping which were all won in 1975. She has two WPRA season titles in barrel racing in 1976 and 1977. She has 11 qualifications to the NFR on which she used three horses in the process. At the 1984 NFR, on her horse registered name Smooth Cadett, nicknamed Cat, she won the first five rounds. At the time, this was unmatched by any other contestant.

== Honors ==
- 1992 National Cowgirl Hall of Fame
- 1996 Tad Lucas Award from the National Cowboy and Western Heritage Museum
- 1997 Texas Rodeo Cowboy Hall of Fame
- 2003 Texas Cowboy Hall of Fame 2003
- 2016 Rodeo Hall of Fame of the National Cowboy and Western Heritage Museum
- 2019 ProRodeo Hall of Fame

== Personal ==
Munroe and her husband currently reside in Valley Mills, Texas.
