= Texas Rodeo Cowboy Hall of Fame =

Hall of Fame for Cowboys

- Established: 1975
- Location: Stockyards Championship Rodeo, 121 E. Exchange Avenue, Fort Worth, TX 76164
- Type: Hall of fame
- Website: TRCHF

The Texas Rodeo Cowboy Hall of Fame is a museum and hall of fame in Fort Worth, Texas, dedicated to the sport of rodeo.

== History ==
This hall of fame was founded by Johnny Boren. Also contributing to the foundation were a group of Belton, Texas, businessmen. At the time of the foundation, Boren was the manager of the Lone Star Circuit of the Professional Rodeo Cowboys Association. Boren was also a businessman and former bull rider. He founded the Old Timers Rodeo Association. They first located the hall of fame in several businesses in Belton lastly moving to the Bell County Expo Center. Eventually, they moved the hall back to its birthplace, about a block from the Ford dealership where it was created.

== Organization ==
The Hall of Fame is currently housed in the Cowtown Coliseum in the Fort Worth Stockyards Historic District. A display of over 300 pictures and biographies is on the walls for the current inductees, who are Texas rodeo cowboys, cowgirls, organizations, and livestock. The hall's goal is to preserve the history and tradition of the cowboy and cowgirl. Individuals are inducted annually. World champions are inducted, of course, but also less-familiar individuals. More than 500,000 people visit the hall annually. Recently added to the hall are the Promoting the Future program, with a scholarship for high-school individuals to help them attend college, and the Horizon Honoree program to recognize exceptional high-school and college rodeo performers.

== Induction ==
An induction ceremony takes place each year, usually on the first Saturday in April, at River Ranch in the Fort Worth Stockyards Historic District. The weekend also includes a golf tournament on Thursday, and a Rodeo Reunion gathering and unveiling of plaques at Cowtown Coliseum on Friday afternoon. In 2005, the Hall of Fame inducted as members the former rodeo performer and promoter Dan Taylor of Doole, and his wife, Berva.

== Hall of Fame inductees ==
Event	Type	Individual name/Place name/Owner	Location	Year	Refs
1-Event		Cowtown Coliseum - Hub Baker		2011	
1-Event		Fort Worth Stock Show and Rodeo		2015	
1-Event		Gladewater Rodeo Committee		2008	
1-Event		Houston Rodeo		2013	
1-Event		Killeen Rodeo Association		2006	
1-Event		Pioneer Association Clay County		2002	
1-Event		San Angelo Roping Fiesta		2010	
1-Event		San Antonio Stock Show & Rodeo - Keith Martin		2011	
1-Event		Santa Rosa Palomino Club		2012	
1-Event		Tarleton State University 1967 Men's Rodeo Team		2017	
1-Event		Tarleton State Women's Team, National Champions, 1969-70-71		2020	
1-Event		Texas Cowboy Reunion		2019	
1-Event		West Texas Fair & Rodeo	Abilene	2009	
1-Event		Windy Ryon Memorial Roping		2016	
2-Animal	Livestock	"Bodacious" owned by Andrews Rodeo Company		2020	
2-Animal	Livestock	"Brown" owned by Bubba and Deb Manon		2012	
2-Animal	Livestock	"Brownie"		2017	
2-Animal	Livestock	"Cebe Reed" owned by Martha Josey		2019	
2-Animal	Livestock	"Jocko" Free Malone owned by Lloyd and Kathy Hodges		2020	
2-Animal	Livestock	"King Surgeon"		2017	
2-Animal	Livestock	"Matilda" owned by Leon Coffee		2013	
2-Animal	Livestock	"Pearl", Big Smokin' Wonder		2016	
2-Animal	Livestock	"Red" Star Plaudit		2015	
2-Animal	Livestock	"V-61" owned by Billy Minick		2012	
2-Animal	Livestock	"War Wagon" owned by Marvin Cantrell		2019	
2-Animal	Livestock	"Whit" owned by Butch Stoneman		2014	
2-Animal	Livestock	"Zombie A" owned by Billie McBride		2013	
		Gerald Abbot		2001	
		Johnny Ackel		2003	
		Jan Hogg Ratjen Acola		2008	
		Logan Adams		2011	
		Merrill Adams-Ellis		2012	
		Ira Akers		1999	
		Eddy Akridge		2002	
		J. R. Akridge		2002	
		Grady Allen		2002	
		Guy Allen		2009	
		Kirk Allmon		2015	
		Tommy Alston		2000	
		Jim Bob Altizer		2003	
		Mack Altizer		2011	
		Sherry Altizer Ingham		2013	
		Jimmy Anderson		2007	
		Burr D. Andrews		2006	
		Sammy Andrews		2008	
	Gold Card	Roy Angermiller		2020	
		Bo Ashorn		2011	
	Men Contestants	Matt Austin		2020	
		Gene Autry		2013	
		Angie Watts Averhoff		2014	
		Russ Baize		2016	
		Mark Baker		2008	
		R. C. "Granny" Bales		2003	
		Mike Bandy		2007	
		Moe Bandy		2007	
		Dudley Barker Jr.		2001	
		Curtis Barron		1983	
		Darrell Barron		2008	
		N.E. "Peanut" Barron		1998	
		Bobby Joe Bartley		2000	
		Pearl Jenkins Bartley		2007	
		Bill Barton		1998	
		Leon Bauerie		2003	
		Ernest Beakley		2007	
		Kenneth Beasley		2001	
	Johnny Boren Award	Andra Beatty		2020	
		Joe Beaver		2003	
		Rex Beck		2007	
	Johnny Boren Award	The Belton Ladies		2019	
		John H. "Sonny" Berry		1996	
		Glen Bird		2010	
		Bob "BB" Bird		2011	
		John William "Twiggy" Bland		2011	
		R.L. Bland		2011	
		Rex Bland		2009	
		Rosemary Bland		2009	
		Steve Bland		2009	
		Bob Blandford		2010	
		Kay Blandford		2014	
		Butch Bode		2014	
		Ricky Bolin		2011	
		Bobby Booth		2000	
		Clinton Booth		1976	
		Eddie Boren		1995	
		Johnny Boren		1997	
		C.R. Boucher		2016	
		Bert Bounds		2009	
		Ed Bourquin		1995	
		David Bowden		2015	
		Robert "Muscles" Boyd		1999	
		Rick Bradley		2014	
		Jack B. (J.B.) Bradshaw		2016	
		Leo Brannan		2008	
		Jack Bridges Jr.		1981	
		Gayle Brittain		2010	
		Dave Brock		2009	
		Jeana Brooks		2011	
	Men Contestants	Jon Brockway		2019	
		Beck Bland Brown		2011	
		Bobby "Hooter" Brown		2003	
		George & Beulah Brown		1997	
		Weldon Burgoon		2010	
		Jack Burkholder		2009	
		Curtis Burlin		2001	
		Shelly Burmeister-Mowery		2015	
		David Burnham		2012	
		John Burrus		2007	
	Women Contestants	Shanna Bush		2019	
		Wanda Bush		2002	
		Ferrell Butler		2003	
		James "Big Jim" Bynum		1997	
		Eddie Caldwell		1997	
		Jim Calvert		1997	
		Ed Cameron		2001	
		Ricky Canton		2014	
		Marvin Cantrell		2009	
		Lawrence Carey		2002	
		Roy Carter		2014	
		Wacey Cathey		2002	
	Empty Saddles	James R. Cavender		2019	
		Maurice Champion		2001	
		Harold J. "Snuffy" Chancellor		2005	
		Keith Chapman		2012	
		Terry Chapman		2007	
		Rick "The Bumble Bee" Chapman		2014	
		Bo Chesson		2001	
		Hal Thomas Churchill		2011	
	Men Contestant	Derek C. Clark		2019	
		John B. Clark		2003	
		Rowland Clark		2011	
		Vicki Taylor Cleveland		2011	
		Dan O. Coates		2005	
		Jerry L. Cobie		2003	
		Doyle Cobier		2001	
		Gene O. "Buddy" Cockrell		2014	
		Lawrence Coffee		2016	
		Leon Coffee		2004	
		Everett E. Colborn		1977	
		Chili Cole		1998	
		Ed Cole		2004	
		Neil Collier		2001	
		Ron Conaster		2015	
		Gerald Conner		2003	
		Sarge Cook		2003	
		Roy Cooper		2010	
		Dan Courier		2012	
		Corley Cox		2016	
		Dickie Cox		1997	
		Jackie Bob Cox		2013	
		James Alfred Cox		2003	
		A.T. "Tony" Crainer		2003	
		Allen B. Crainer		1998	
		Bob Crill		2011	
		J.G. Crouch		2006	
		Bill Crowder		2013	
		Dr. Andrew Currie		2012	
		Governor Bill Daniel		2003	
		"Smokey" Joe F. Davis		2009	
		Alvin Davis		2009	
		Joe Davis		2001	
		Larry Dawson		2013	
		Carl Deaton		2010	
		Jo Decker		2003	
		Bobby Delvecchio		2011	
		Billy Joe Deussen		2000	
		Lt. Governor David Dewhurst		2009	
		Myrtis Dightman		2001	
		Monk Dishman		2015	
		George Doak		2002	
		Quail Dobbs		2000	
	Gold Card	Chuck Doebbler		2019	
	Men Contestants	Royd Doyal		2020	
		Austin Doolittle		1975	
		Glenn Dorn		2003	
		Pat Doyal		2007	
		Red Doyal		2017	
		Skipper Driver		2016	
		Betty Barron Dusek		2010	
		Buck Eckols		2001	
		Diltzie Bland Edmondson		2011	
		Johnny Kirk Edmondson		2014	
		Sunny Edwards		2011	
		Buran Elliot		1998	
		Jack Elliot		2000	
		Cecil Ellis		1997	
		Merrill Adams Ellis		2012	
	Johnny Boren Award	Wanie Ellis		2019	
		Chick Elms		1996	
		Clarence Monroe "Monte" Elms		2005	
		David Elms		2004	
		Johnny Emmons		2014	
		Don Endsley		2011	
		Bobby & Marianne Estes		1998	
		Billie Ann Evans		2007	
		J.W. "Bub" Evans		2004	
		Sig Faircloth		1981	
		Mildred Farris & John Farris		2004	
		Tom Feller		2015	
		C.D. Ferguson		1998	
		C.L. "Buck" Ferguson		2001	
		Larry Ferguson		2013	
		Dan Fisher		2017	
		Ralph Fisher		2009	
	Men Contestants	Leonard Fluitt		2020	
		Lane Foltyn		2016	
	Empty Saddles	Billy Charles Ford		2019	
		Todd Fox		2003	
	Western Heritage	Beckie Frazier		2020	
		Dr. Tandy Freeman		2008	
	Empty Saddles	Jasbo Fulkerson		2020	
		Amye Gamblin		1978	
	Men Contestants	Tutt Garnett		2019	
		Debbie Garrison		2017	
		Joe Gaskin		2010	
		John Gass		2016	
		Norman Gatlin		2000	
		Dan A. Gattis		2010	
		D.J. "Kajun Kidd" Gaudin		1998	
		Don Gay		2007	
		Jim Gay		2007	
		Neal & Kay Gay		2007	
		Pete Gay		2007	
		Bill George		1999	
		Jimmie George		2008	
		A.L. "Duke" Gibbs		2005	
		L.G. Gibbs		1977	
		Derrell Gilfillan		2003	
		Hollis & Wana Gilfillan		2001	
		George Glascock		1980	
		John Gloor		2015	
		W.R. "Dude" Goodrum		2001	
		Colby Jay Goodwin		2017	
		C.L. "Bubba" Goudeau		2000	
		Charlie Graham		1999	
		Don Graham		2006	
		Dr. Charles Graham		2008	
		Dwight Graham		1999	
		Gene Graham		2011	
		Calvin Norris Greely Jr.		2016	
		Keith Greene		2004	
		Freddy Lynn "Gomer" Greer		2005	
		Gary "Goose" Gregg		2016	
		Dick Griffith		2015	
		Spicer Gripp		2009	
		Buddy Groff		1981	
		Sammie Groves		2011	
		Melton "Sugar" Grunwald		2009	
		Warren Gunn		2001	
		Tony Guyn		1996	
		Tony Gale Haberer		2005	
		Tom Hadley		1997	
	Women Contestants	Trina Powers Hadley		2020	
		Taylor "Prairie Kid" Hall Jr.		2001	
	Women Contestants	Vannie Halliday		2020	
		Jim Haltom		2000	
		J.J. Hamptom		2009	
		Donna Fay Hinson Hanks		2006	
		Dr. T.K. Hardy DVM		2015	
		Miles Hare		2008	
		Frank Harris		2001	
		Leslie Harrison		2008	
		Delbert Hataway		2002	
		John Hatley		1998	
	Men Contestants	J. Pete Hawkins		2020	
		Jackie Flowers Hayden		1997	
		Richard "Tuff" Hedeman		2010	
		Gary "Roach" Hedeman		2014	
		John Henry		1975	
		Ken Henry		2010	
		M.H. Henry		2004	
		Monty "Hawkeye" Henson		2004	
		Clyde Hebert		2001	
	Women Contestants	Tami Noble Herbert		2019	
		Holt Hickman		2015	
		Cecil Alford Hill		2004	
	Western Heritage	Jerry Hill		2020	
		Bob Hinds		2011	
		Byrel Hittson		1980	
		Jimmy Hodge		2014	
		Tina Lee "Tiny Sikes" Hodge		2007	
		William Henry "Bill" Hogg		2009	
		Raymond Hollabaugh		2011	
		Ellis White Holland Sr.		1975	
		Less Hood		1995	
		Dave Hopper		2006	
		Frank Horelica		1980	
		Michael "Smurf" Horton		2013	
	Gold Card	Jim Houson		2020	
		Don Howell		2016	
		Wright Howington		2008	
		Mike Hudson		2011	
		Logan John Huffman		2008	
		Raymond Hulin		2005	
		Clinton H. "Bud" Humphrey		1995	
		Samuel Paul Humphrey Jr.		2004	
		Sherry Altizer Ingham		2013	
		Buster Ivory		2001	
		June Ivory		2001	
		David Jennings		2012	
	Men Contestants	Jason Jeter		2020	
		Bernis Johnson		1998	
		Clint Johnson		2017	
		Eugene Johnson		2002	
		Hackberry Johnson		2010	
		Sherry Price Johnson		2015	
		Darrly "Bronc" Jones		2010	
		R.E. Martha Josey		2007	
		Bussy Kaul		2001	
		Whit Keeney		2001	
		Glenn W. Keith		2003	
		Kenneth Kelley		2011	
		Liz & Reg Kesler		2008	
		Clyde Kimbro		2010	
		Butch Kirby		2012	
		Sandy Kirby		2006	
		Cody Lambert		2012	
	Men Contestants	Darrell Lambert		2019	
		Roger Langford		2005	
		Fay Ann Horton Leach		2011	
		Fannie Mae Collier Cox Levi		2003	
		G.K. Lewallen		1997	
		Thomas Earl Wayne "Tex" Lewis		1999	
		John Lindsey		2001	
		H.D. "Curley" Linehan		2001	
		Bob Logue		2009	
		Chuck Logue		2009	
		Hughie Long		1978	
		Jack Long		1996	
		Dillard "Doc" Lucas		1977	
		Tad Lucas		2010	
		Tommy Lucia		2017	
		Gene Lyda		2015	
		O.B. Lynam		2001	
		Phil Lyne		2006	
		Sammy Magana		2011	
		Randy Magers		2006	
		Larry Mahan		2015	
		Toots Mansfield		2002	
		Jayne Marcum		2012	
		Clyde H. Martin		2006	
		George "Tex" Martin		2000	
		Mike Mathis		2013	
		Ann Mattison		2013	
		Harley May		2012	
		Nancy Gault Mayes		2020	
		Bob Mayo		2011	
		J.H. "Goat" Mayo		2001	
		Paul Mayo		2011	
		Ray Mayo		2013	
		Billie McBride		1980	
		Wilson McBride		2007	
		Don McClure		2012	
		Leonard McCravey		2012	
	Men Contestants	Casey McGlaun		2020	
		Glen McIlvain		2012	
		Denny McLanahan		2017	
		Don McLaughlin		2014	
		Gene McLaughlin		2014	
		Mike McLaughlin		2013	
		Shawn McMullan		2012	
		Bonnie McPherson		2017	
		L.G. "Glenn" McQueen		2005	
		Brandon McReynolds		2013	
		Bob Meacham		1999	
		D.L. "Dwayne" Meacham		1999	
		Jeff Medders		1999	
		Alva Jean McBride Meek		2008	
		Junior Meek		1999	
		Johnny Mellon		1975	
		David Merrill		2009	
	Johnny Boren Award	Charlene Proctor Mewhinney		2019	
		Sue Miller		2005	
		Billy & Pam Minick		2011	
		Ralph Mitchell		2009	
		Deb Mohon		2010	
		Bubba Monkres		2011	
	Johnny Boren Award	Rita Williams Moon		2019	
		Michael Moore		2015	
	Gold Card	Randy G. Moore		2019	
		R.H. Moss		2010	
		Lee Mullins		2007	
		Jimmie Gibbs Munroe		1997	
		Bud Munroe		2015	
		Ty Murray		2016	
		Stephen Murrin Jr.		2011	
		Carl Nafzger		2008	
		Jack Newton		2007	
		Robert William "Booger Red" Nixon Jr.		2007	
		Charlie O'Reily		1998	
		Punch & Fay Oglesby		2014	
		A.G. Ollre III		1999	
		Altizer Rigs Ora		2012	
		Tuff Overturff		2008	
		Tommy Owens		2008	
		Joe Beaver Pat		2011	
		Neida Patton		2009	
		George Paul		2005	
		Monty Penney		2016	
		S.K. "Kenneth" Pressley		2007	
		Sherman Pressley		2010	
		Bobby G. "Cotton" Proctor		1975	
		Ronnie Proctor		2003	
		Tommy Puryear		2009	
		Charlie Rankin		2003	
		Dick Ratjen		2007	
		Jack Ratjen		2007	
		NaRay McHood Ratliff		2002	
		Art Ray		2016	
		Durwood "Mitz" Ray		2007	
		Tom Ray		2012	
		Lightening Bobby Steiner		2011	
		Virginia Reger		2007	
		Reid & Mary Jo Roland		2001	
		Buddy Reynolds		2017	
		Don "Little Brown Jug" Reynolds		2015	
	Empty Saddles	Foy & Jody Reynolds		2020	
		Frank Rhoades		2001	
		Jack Rice		2013	
		Dickie Richard		2002	
		Manuelita Woodward Richards		2003	
		Roy Lee (R.L.) Richardson		2017	
	Women Contestants	Dollie Beutler Riddle		2020	
		Rusty Riddle		2009	
		Wallace Riddle		1976	
		Ora Altizer		2012	
		Cullen A. Robinson		2007	
		Billy "Red" Rogers		2004	
		Mason Romans Sr.		2001	
		Bob Romer		2009	
		John Rothwell		2010	
		John Routh		1999	
		James Riley Saunders		1977	
		Charmayne James & Scamper		2011	
		John "Shoe" Schueneman		2017	
		DeLois Hinson Senez		2008	
		Ralph Senn		2005	
		Rusty Sewalt		2016	
		La Tonne Sewalt		2004	
		Ronnye Sewalt		2001	
		Royce Sewalt		2002	
		Jim "Razor" Sharp		2009	
		Hobb Shed		1981	
		Dee Sheets		2014	
		Tommy Sheffield		2008	
		Bob Sheppard		2008	
		Johnny Shields		2013	
		Joseph "Joe" Wilson Sikes		1998	
		L.N. "Sonny" Sikes		1978	
		Velvet Bernis Johnson Sipping		2011	
		Rob Smets		2010	
		Blanche Altizer Smith		2006	
	Gold Card	Clifton Smith		2019	
		Dean Smith		2006	
		Dude Smith		1999	
		Frances Crane Smith		2000	
		Jerald Smith		2010	
	Rodeo Personnel	Jim D. Smith		2019	
		Olie Smith		2014	
		Paul Smith		2011	
		T.M. "Smitty" Smith		2014	
		Vern Smith		2017	
		Doc Stanger		2000	
		Red Steagall		2005	
		Beverly Steiner		2009	
		Bobby Steiner		2000	
		Buck Steiner		2000	
		Sid Steiner		2008	
		Tommy Steiner		1997	
		Duane Stephens		2008	
		Logan Stevens		2008	
		Kevin Stewart		2015	
		J.W. Stoker		2015	
		John Stokes		2016	
		Dale Stone		1999	
		Wayne H. Stroud		2011	
		Ike Tacker		1983	
		J.D. Tadlock Sr.		2014	
	Western Heritage Couple	Bob & Kristen Tallman		2019	
		Bill Tatum		2008	
		Andy Taylor		2008	
	Empty Saddles	Cliff Taylor		2019	
		Berva Dawn Sorenson		2005	
		Dan Taylor		2005	
		George Thomas Taylor Jr.		2001	
		Monty Taylor		2008	
		Tom Taylor		2017	
		Jon Temple		2001	
		Eula Gene Hinson Thomas		1977	
		Orville Thomas		1976	
		Willie Thomas		2004	
		Roy "Tuffy" Thompson		2013	
		Charlie Throckmorton		2007	
		Brent Thurman		2002	
		Sissy Thurman		1978	
		Charlie Tindol		2015	
		Charlie Thompson		2017	
		Harry Tompkins		1997	
		Bud Townsend		2008	
		Monroe Tumlinson		2010	
		Hazel Turner		2005	
		Matt Tyler		2014	
		William "Bud" Upton		2011	
		Dan Utely		1978	
		John VanCronhite		2011	
		Randy Vaughn		2016	
		Rudy E. Vela		2011	
		Cecil Vick		2006	
		Glenn Vick		1998	
		Skipper Voss		2006	
		Tooter Waites		2011	
		Bill Walker		2000	
		Byron Walker		2008	
		Claude Henry "Red" Walker		1999	
		Reagon Walker		2012	
		Richard Wayne "Dick" Walker		2005	
		Whitey Bob Walker		2003	
		Morris Walker		2015	
		Frank E. Wallace Jr.		2010	
		Pat Wallace		2019	
		Roy Wallace		2008	
		Whitney Wallace		2013	
		Terry Walls		--	
		T.J. Ward		2013	
		Jack Ward		2006	
	Men Contestants	James Ward		2019	
		Corky Warren		2012	
		Jim Watkins		2010	
		Bud Watson		1999	
		Harold Watson		1975	
		Eugene Weakley		2012	
		John E. "Ronny" Webb		1999	
		Dan Webb		2015	
	Empty Saddles	Taylor Webb		2020	
		Billy Weeks		1998	
		Guy Weeks		1997	
		L.E. Weeks		2000	
		Wesley Bowie		2013	
		Howard Westfall		1980	
		Genevieve Hauff		2004	
		Marvin Weyer		2001	
		Earl Wharton		1997	
		Ray Wharton		2002	
		J.T. "Whiz" Whisenhunt		2008	
		Hub Whiteman		1997	
		Jim Whiteman		1980	
		Fred Whitfield		2012	
		George Wilderspin		1999	
		Bill Williams		2005	
		Ronnie Williams		2010	
		Sloan Williams		2009	
		Billy T. Wilis		2004	
		Dan Willis		1997	
		John M. Wilson		2007	
		R.B. Wilson		2005	
		Stanley Wilson		1998	
		Joe Wimberly		2013	
		Delbert Wise		1999	
		Jack Wiseman		2012	
		Gail Woerner		2012	
		Lloyd Woodley		2009	
		Edd Workman		2005	
		Don Workman		2015	
		Jackie Worthington		2009	
		Martha Wright		2008	
	Men Contestants	Lonnie Wyatt		2019	
		Clinton Wyche		2003	
		Mack Yates		2004	
		James Zant		2015	
