= June Ivory =

Rodeo secretary (1931–2004)

June Ivory (born June 17, 1931 – November 9, 2004) was inducted into the ProRodeo Hall of Fame in 2004.

== Life ==
June Ivory was born June Bull on June 17, 1931, in Pampa, Texas. June married fellow hall of famer Buster Ivory in 1954, and her friend Liz Kezler was her maid of honor.

== Career ==
Ivory started out as a professional barrel racer. However, she and friend Liz Kesler started to secretary and time rodeos, working rodeos all over the country. Ivory taught fellow barrel racer Lydia Moore how to secretary and time rodeos. Ivory also worked with her husband for many decades with the goal of enlarging and improving rodeo. Ivory was outspoken but had a good heart. She always helped someone in need and could rise to meet any occasion. She flourished in all aspects of the rodeo business. She worked for many of the most notable stock contractors. In 1959, she unloaded the first horse to start the first National Finals Rodeo (NFR). Ivory possessed a real knack for showy attire, thus carrying the American flag during the opening ceremonies of the National Finals Rodeo. In 1968, she instituted the first secretary school. She was one of the ladies who created the NFR Ladies Day. She would coordinate the annual Cowboy Reunion every year. "I always wanted to be a rodeo glamour gal and rodeo secretary”, she said. “My dreams came true. I had a great life and wouldn't change one thing".

In 2000, Buster and June Ivory hosted a Cowboy Reunion in Las Vegas, Nevada, at the Excalibur Hotel. The event is an annual one that draws plenty of former contestants. That year's event was held at the same time the NFR was going on in the same city. There was some reminiscing about the Madison Square Garden Rodeos (they are the forerunner to today's NFR). That year's event also included ten former members of the original Cowboy's Turtle Association (the precursor to today's Professional Rodeo Cowboys Association).

Ivory was inducted into the Texas Rodeo Cowboy Hall of Fame in 2001. She was inducted into the Rodeo Hall of Fame of the National Cowboy & Western Heritage Museum in 2004. She died in Pampa, Texas, on November 9, 2004, at the age of 73.

== External sources ==
- 2004 ProRodeo Hall of Fame Inductee June Ivory
