= Sissy Thurman =

American barrel racer (1934–1968)

Elenor "Sissy" Thurman (March 29, 1934 – October 2, 1968), was a National Cowgirl Museum and Hall of Fame 1975 inductee. She was also inducted into the Texas Rodeo Cowboy Hall of Fame in 1978.

== Life ==
Elenor Sissy Thurman was born Eleanor Marie Regini in Galveston, Texas, on March 29, 1934. She was married to Doug Thurman until her death. She started riding horses at age five. She competed in her first barrel race at 11. Thurman was a rodeo queen at some nearby rodeo and stock shows. Prior to starting down the rodeo path, she was a tap dancer. She also taught tap dancing.

== Career ==
In her time, Thurman was one of the top-ranked and fastest barrel racers in the country. She set the fastest time at the National Finals Rodeo (NFR) and held that record for a time. She held barrel racing clinics and held the position of barrel racing director in the Girl's Rodeo Association (the predecessor to the Women's Professional Rodeo Association). The GRA was founded in 1948. The foundation occurred one year after the first all-girls rodeo, which took place in Amarillo, Texas. She took advantage of her barrel racing experience while she was director to further develop opportunities for all who followed her footsteps.

Thurman first competed in the time when barrel racing was a 1940s-era "paid performance" of "ranch girls" event. But as her career evolved, the sport developed into true competition that established itself as a real rodeo event. By 1968, Thurman was a nine-time qualifier of the NFR and was ranked second in the World Standings heading into that year's NFR.

== Death ==
In 1968, Thurman accepted a ride from another rodeo family, last name Lewis. Among them was Ann Lewis, the leading barrel racer in the GRA standings. They were headed Thurman's way from a performance in Little Rock, Arkansas, to rodeo slack in Waco, Texas. On October 2, at 1:15 a.m, the Lewis vehicle slammed into an overturned 18-wheeler. The wreck killed Thurman, Ann Lewis, Lewis' twin sister Jan, their mother Rose, and two barrel racing horses.
