= Jackie Worthington =

American barrel racer (b. 1924)

- Birth name: Jeanette Katherine Worthington
- Occupation: Rodeo competitor
- Discipline: Barrel racing
- Born: August 13, 1924; Jacksboro, Texas
- Died: September 26, 1987 (aged 63); Jacksboro, Texas

Honors
- National Cowgirl Museum and Hall of Fame; Texas Rodeo Cowboy Hall of Fame

Jeanette Katherine Worthington (August 13, 1924 – September 26, 1987), known as Jackie Worthington, was an American Cowgirl and founding member and former president of the Girls Rodeo Association, now the Women's Professional Rodeo Association (WPRA).

== Early life ==
Jackie Worthington was born Jeanette Katherine Worthington on August 13, 1924, on a 10,000 acres (4,000 ha) ranch near Jacksboro, Texas. She learned riding on her parents' ranch, using all types of livestock to train. Since other rodeo events were not considered fit for a women, the first event she was allowed to compete in was barrel racing. Finally, in 1940, at a girls only rodeo, she rode an exhibition bull for $7.50 in Wichita Falls, Texas. Worthington was also an accomplished athlete, musician, and licensed pilot. She graduated from the Texas State College for Women in 1949.

== Career ==
Worthington was one of the 38 women who came together in San Angelo, Texas, on February 28, 1948, founding the Girls Rodeo Association (GRA), now the Women's Professional Rodeo Association. As a founding member, she was also the Bareback Riding Director in 1948, later serving as president of the GRA in 1955. As president, she signed an agreement with the Rodeo Cowboys Association (RCA) (now the PRCA) for women's events at RCA rodeos to be GRA-sanctioned.

She retired at age 32, having spent 13 years at the rodeo with 6 all-around titles and 23 world championship wins in various events, including 7 in bull riding. After retiring, she returned to run her family's ranch, West Fork, in Jacksboro.

In 1975, Worthington was inducted into the National Cowgirl Museum and Hall of Fame. In 2009, she was inducted into the Texas Rodeo Cowboy Hall of Fame.
