= Billy Minick =

American rodeo cowboy and stock contractor

- Born: January 10, 1939 (age 87); Fort Worth, Texas, U.S.
- Education: McNeese State University
- Occupations: Bull rider, bareback bronc rider, stock contractor, rodeo producer, nightclub owner
- Spouse: Pam Minick
- Children: 4

Billy Minick (born January 10, 1939) is an American former professional rodeo cowboy and former stock contractor. He is part-owner of Billy Bob's Texas.

== Life and career ==
Billy Minick was born on January 10, 1939, in Fort Worth, Texas. He attended McNeese State University in Lake Charles, Louisiana. While at McNeese, he was a member of the college rodeo team, competing in bareback bronc riding and bull riding. He joined the Rodeo Cowboys Association (RCA) in 1959 and was a scorekeeper at the inaugural National Finals Rodeo (NFR) in Dallas, Texas, that year. He qualified for and competed as a bull rider at the 1966 NFR in Oklahoma City, Oklahoma.

In 1968, Minick purchased the Harry Knight Rodeo Company from Knight and Gene Autry. The Billy Minick Rodeo Company produced top bucking stock, including the 1972 NFR top saddle bronc horse Streamer and the 1973 NFR top bull Tiger, who would also win the 1974 RCA Bull of the Year title. Other famous Billy Minick Rodeo Company stock included bulls Mr. Bubbles and V-61 and horses Lonesome, Crazy 1, and My Fair Lady.

Through the years, Minick helped to produce rodeos such as the Fort Worth Stock Show & Rodeo, Rodeo Houston, the San Antonio Stock Show & Rodeo, the Santa Rosa Roundup in Vernon, Texas, the San Angelo Stock Show & Rodeo, the Tri-State Rodeo in Fort Madison, Iowa, and Cheyenne Frontier Days. Several of the rodeos he produced also featured musical entertainment, and this was the beginning of Minick's long history of booking and promoting entertainers. Some of the acts Minick worked with were Elvis Presley, The Jackson 5, Cher, and Roy Rogers.

In 1981, Minick was hired to produce the bull riding at the newly opened Billy Bob's Texas nightclub in the Fort Worth Stockyards. He later became the venue's general manager and held that position until 1986. In 1989, Minick joined the group that purchased Billy Bob's Texas, and together with his partners, they control around 120 acres in the Stockyards. Minick served as the president of Billy Bob's Texas, as well as the executive director of Cowtown Coliseum for several years.

== Personal life ==
Minick married 1973 Miss Rodeo America Pam Martin on May 29, 1983. She has been a rodeo and western-lifestyle television personality for several years. She was also the marketing director at Billy Bob's Texas for over 25 years. They live on a ranch in Argyle, Texas.

Minick has four children with his previous wife, Dianne Schafer; Cheyenne, Cody, Brandy and Concho, and has five grandchildren. Cody died at 41 on October 7, 2008, after a two-year battle with cancer. Brandy worked at Billy Bob's for over 20 years. Concho also served as Billy Bob's president for several years.

== Honors ==
In 2004, Billy and Pam Minick were both inducted into the Texas Cowboy Hall of Fame.

In 2008, Billy was awarded the National Cowboy and Western Heritage Museum's Ben Johnson Memorial Award.

In 2011, Billy and Pam both were inducted into the Texas Rodeo Cowboy Hall of Fame and the Texas Trail of Fame. That same year, Billy was awarded the Texas Heritage Songwriters Association's Patron Award.

In 2018, Billy was inducted into the ProRodeo Hall of Fame.

In 2022, Billy was inducted into the Bull Riding Hall of Fame.

In 2025, Billy and Pam were both awarded the Legends of ProRodeo by the ProRodeo Hall of Fame.
