= Jim Bob Altizer =

American calf and steer roper (1932-1997)

- Born: May 5, 1932; Del Rio, Texas, U.S.
- Died: December 12, 1997 (aged 65); Del Rio, Texas, U.S.
- Occupations: Calf and steer roper
- Relatives: Blanche Altizer Smith (sister)

Jim Bob Altizer (May 5, 1932 – December 12, 1997) was an American professional rodeo cowboy who specialized in calf and steer roping. He competed in the Rodeo Cowboys Association (RCA), and won the RCA calf roping world championship in 1959 and the RCA steer roping world championship in 1967.

== Life and career ==
Jim Bob Altizer was born on May 5, 1932, in Del Rio, Texas, to Olin and Estella Cauthorn Altizer.

He was the Texas state high school calf-roping champion in 1947 and the U.S. national high school calf-roping champion in 1948. He graduated from Del Rio High School, also in 1948. He turned professional in 1950.

He won the calf-roping world championship at the inaugural National Finals Rodeo (NFR) in 1959, and the steer-roping world championship at the National Finals Steer Roping (NFSR) in 1967. He qualified for the NFR as a calf roper ten times and the NFSR six times. He won numerous rodeo titles throughout his career, and retired in 1976.

Throughout his life, Altizer was a Texas border ranchman.

Altizer died on December 12, 1997, in Del Rio, Texas, of cancer, at the age of 65.

His older sister Blanche Altizer Smith was a professional rodeo cowgirl herself, as was his daughter Sherry.

His son Mack was a professional rodeo stock contractor for many years as the owner of Bad Company Rodeo.

== Honors ==
- In 1979, Jim Bob Altizer was one of the inaugural inductees into the ProRodeo Hall of Fame.
- In 1995, he was inducted into the Rodeo Hall of Fame of the National Cowboy & Western Heritage Museum.
- He was posthumously inducted into the Texas Rodeo Cowboy Hall of Fame in 2003, the Texas Rodeo Hall of Fame in 2004, and the Texas Cowboy Hall of Fame in 2009.
