= Jimmy Anderson (bullfighter) =

American professional rodeo bullfighter

Jimmy D. "Jungle" Anderson (September 6, 1953 – December 5, 2008) was an American professional rodeo bullfighter.

== Life and career ==
Born in Fort Worth, Texas, Anderson originally raced horses until he grew past the size of the average jockey. He later became a bullfighter and barrelman.

He worked in the Canadian Professional Rodeo Association (CPRA), Professional Rodeo Cowboys Association (PRCA), and Professional Bull Riders (PBR) circuits. He took part in several events, including each respective organization's championship events; the Canadian Finals Rodeo (CFR) in 1977, 1979, and 1983, the National Finals Rodeo (NFR) in 1982 and 1985, and the PBR World Finals every year from 1994 through 2001. He was also a freestyle bullfighter and competed in the Wrangler Bullfighting Tour, making the finals at the 1985 NFR. He retired after the 2001 PBR World Finals.

Anderson's professional bullfighting career spanned 32 years, and he was described as one of the "original bullfighters" on the PBR tour.

He was known for wearing his distinctive purple cowboy hat with plastic bull horns and red wig while performing during the latter years of his career, and was one of the last PBR bullfighters to wear clown make-up and baggy outfits before they switched to wearing sport jerseys and shorts in the 2003 season.

Anderson died of heart disease on December 5, 2008, at the age of 55.

== Honors ==
In April 2007, Anderson was inducted into the Texas Rodeo Cowboy Hall of Fame.

In October 2020, he was posthumously inducted as a member of the inaugural class of the Original Wrangler Bullfights Hall of Fame.

In May 2026, he was posthumously inducted into the Bull Riding Hall of Fame.
