= Blanche Altizer Smith =

American cattlewoman (1928-1998)

Blanche Luela Altizer Smith (July 16, 1928 – December 30, 1998) was inducted into the National Cowgirl Museum and Hall of Fame in 1976.

== Life ==
Blanche Luela Altizer was born on July 16, 1928, into a Southern Texas ranching family. She was the older sister of the ProRodeo Hall of Fame calf and steer roper Jim Bob Altizer.

She married Floyd E. "Bud" Smith, and they had two sons, Olie and Jimmy. When their parents died, Olie and Jimmy carried on the ranch and rodeo tradition and live in the Sonora, Texas, area.

Blanche's nephew Mack, Jim Bob's son, was a professional rodeo stock contractor for many years as the owner of Bad Company Rodeo. Her niece Sherry, Jim Bob's daughter, was a professional rodeo cowgirl who competed in the Women's Professional Rodeo Association (WPRA).

== Career ==
Smith competed in professional calf roping with much success, becoming a champion several times. She competed at major rodeos in Texas, many times competing against men. She also competed as a barrel racer and as a team roper. In another vein, she served as secretary and timer.

Later, Smith was first one of the association secretaries and then one of the founding directors of the Girls Rodeo Association (GRA) in 1948. Additionally, she served as the Team/Tying/Cow Milking Director. The GRA later became the Women's Professional Rodeo Association (WPRA).

The GRA was officially formed on February 23, 1948, by 23 women who met with this intention at the San Angelus Hotel in San Angelo, Texas. Smith was one of the officers elected that day.

The GRA lobbied to increase the amount of prize money for the barrel racing event as one of their first actions. One of the first rodeos to agree to these terms was the West of the Pecos Rodeo by adding money for the event by four places. Another action the GRA took was to adopt the clover leaf pattern, which is still in use, and minimal rule changes were made.

== Death ==
Smith died on December 30, 1998.
