= Keyhole race =

A keyhole race is a speed event commonly seen at equestrian events and gymkhanas, where the horse and rider team completing the event in the fastest time wins. Horses running this event must have speed, but also the agility to stop quickly in full stride, turn, and bolt directly back into a run.

== Course ==
The obstacle course is a pattern, usually marked with white powder (commonly flour or powdered chalk) poured into a "keyhole" shape in the dirt. The pattern varies between events. According to the California Gymkhana Association, the pattern should be set up as follows:

- 80 feet (24 m) from arena gate to timing line.
- 100 feet (30 m) from timing line to center of keyhole.
- Keyhole should be 4 feet (1.2 m) across at the entrance, 10 feet (3.0 m) from the entrance of the keyhole to the bulb.
- The bulb itself should be 20 feet (6.1 m) across.
- The pattern may also be made of cones or poles set up in a similar pattern.

== Timing ==
The event begins when the horse and rider cross the timing line. The team enters the keyhole at a gallop, then turns in either direction inside the keyhole's circle without stepping over the chalk. The horse-and-rider team turns as fast as they can in the bulb. The team then exits the keyhole again at a gallop and the time ends once they cross the timing line.

Winning times for this event range from 5 to 10 seconds.

Penalties may be applied to a team's time. Each gymkhana or event may operate under different rules and therefore the penalties may be different. Penalties may include adding five seconds to a team's time, or even outright disqualification of a team.
