= Star Plaudit =

American barrel racing horse

- Breed: Quarter Horse
- Discipline: Barrel racing
- Sex: gelding
- Foaled: 1948
- Died: 1970 (aged 21–22)
- Country: United States
- Color: Bay
- Owner: Sherry Combs Johnson

Honors
- ProRodeo Hall of Fame

Star Plaudit (1948–c. 1970), nicknamed Red, was a rodeo stock horse who excelled in steer wrestling and barrel racing. He was inducted into the Texas Rodeo Cowboy Hall of Fame in 2015. He was inducted into the ProRodeo Hall of Fame in 2017.

== Background ==
Star Plaudit, nicknamed "Red", was born in 1948. Red was a bay gelding.

World champion barrel racer Sherry Combs Johnson first saw Red when her husband and his brother bought the horse together. Red was a steer wrestling horse. Red was 8 years old then. The brothers competed with him for a time, but then the Johnsons bought his brother out. Combs Johnson needed a barrel horse. Red took to barrel racing almost instantly. Combs Johnson believed that the steer wrestling pattern was responsible for his easy transition and ability to run hard without many mistakes. According to Combs Johnson, Red was also a very independent horse who did not care for human attention. But he did tolerate her best; perhaps like could be used.

== Career ==
Red accomplished a feat in rodeo that no other horse has duplicated. He won two world championships and assisted in the winning in another in one year. First, he carried his owner Combs Johnson to a barrel racing world championship. Then he carried her friend and hall of famer Tom Nesmith to a Rodeo Cowboys Association (now known as the Professional Rodeo Cowboys Association) steer wrestling world championship. Last, he assisted Nesmith in winning the all-around world championship. The year was 1962. "He was one of those once in a lifetime horses", said Johnson." For his early years, he competed in both events at most rodeos. After Combs Johnson was divorced, then Red was strictly hers and strictly a barrel horse.

== Death and legacy ==
Combs Johnson retired Red when he was 18 years old. She let her daughter Becky ride Red in his retirement. Sometime after he had been in her pasture a few years, she sent Red to a family friend, whose young daughter kept Red in the front yard and rode him. It was a tough decision for her, one where she asked the new owners not to tell her when Red died. "Of course, I cried when they finally told me", she admits. Red is buried in Bryan, Texas.

Red died when he was 22 years of age.

== Pedigree ==
Lobos
Dennis Reed
Bess Chitman
Oklahoma Star
Gulliver
Cutthroat
Belle K
Oklahoma Star Jr
Little Earl
Little Earl Jr
Link Willy Mare
Babe Dawson
Little Earl
Queen 14
Texas Qtrmare
Star Plaudit
King Plaudit
Plaudit
Colorado Queen
Blondy Plaudit
Lani Chief
Lani Act
Flaxy Act
Sunshine Plaudit
Not Available
Thompson Mare
Not Available
