= Charmayne James =

American barrel racer

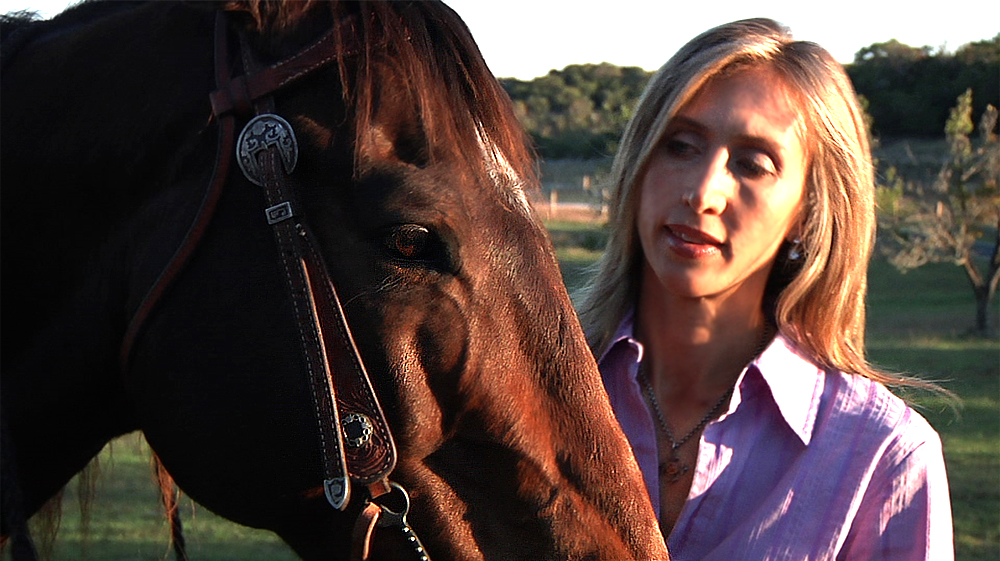
- James in October 2009
- Birth name: Charmayne James
- Occupation: Rodeo competitor
- Discipline: Barrel racing
- Born: June 23, 1970 (age 56); Boerne, Texas
- Major wins/Championships: 11 WPRA barrel racing world championships 7 NFR Average Titles
- Lifetime achievements: Career earnings $1,896,568 through 2002

Honors
- 1984 WPRA Rookie of the Year; 2017 ProRodeo Hall of Fame

Significant horses
- Scamper; Cruiser; Grasshopper; Clayton

Website
- www.charmaynejames.com

Charmayne James (born June 23, 1970) is an American former professional rodeo cowgirl who specialized in barrel racing. In her career, she won 11 Women's Professional Rodeo Association (WPRA) barrel racing world championships, the most in history. She won ten consecutive world championships from 1984 to 1993, and then a final one in 2002. She qualified for the National Finals Rodeo (NFR) 19 times and also won seven NFR barrel racing average titles in 1984, 1986, 1987, 1989, 1990, 1993, and 2002. James retired her horse, Gills Bay Boy, nicknamed Scamper, whom she won the bulk of her titles with, in 1993 after winning her tenth world championship. James herself would retire from barrel racing in 2002 after winning her 11th world championship.

Scamper was inducted into the ProRodeo Hall of Fame in 1996. James was inducted into the National Cowgirl Museum and Hall of Fame in 1992 and the ProRodeo Hall of Fame in 2017. The August 2017 induction ceremony was ProRodeo's 38th annual event, and marked the first time in the event's history that the class of inductees included barrel racers from the WPRA.

== Early history ==
Charmayne James, born June 23, 1970, in Boerne, Texas, was raised in Clayton, New Mexico. She was three years old when she first started riding horses, and by age six she was running barrels. Her recollection of barrel racing is that it was the only thing she ever wanted to do. She began her rodeo career at a young age when she joined the Rabbit Ear 4-H Club. Prior to 2019, barrel racing was the only event women competed in at Professional Rodeo Cowboys Association (PRCA) events, and is second only to bull riding as the most popular event.

As a young girl, James rode Bardo in barrel racing competition. They had competed in amateur rodeos for about two years before Bardo shattered a bone in his leg, and had to be euthanized. James considered Bardo her best friend, which made finding a replacement for him difficult. She eventually set her sights on Gills Bay Boy, an American Quarter Horse Association (AQHA) registered gelding her father had purchased as a four-year-old for $1,100 to sort feedlot cattle. In the beginning, James encountered some behavioral issues with the horse, but over time, she was able to train him for barrel racing competition. He became widely known as Scamper, a nickname originating from a comment her father made while watching them run barrels: "He sure wants to scamper around those barrels."

== ProRodeo career ==
By the end of 1983, James and Scamper had competed on the amateur circuit for approximately three years, and advanced to the pro circuit. James filled her permit for the WPRA following a win at a competition in Dodge City, Kansas. "Filling a permit" is when a contestant fulfills the requirements to become a WPRA card holder, which includes purchasing a permit and earning a minimum dollar amount at sanctioned rodeos. As a card holder, a contestant is allowed to compete in finals events and gain official ranking.

In 1984, the pair began their first season competing at the professional level, and by season's end, James had won $53,499.00 and two championship titles, including 1984 WPRA World Champion Barrel Racer and NFR Barrel Racing Average Champion. She was also named 1984 WPRA Rookie of the Year.

In 1985, the pair earned $93,847 and their 2nd WPRA world championship title. They did it again in 1986, winning their 3rd WPRA world championship title and NFR Average with total earnings of $151,969, achieving professional rodeo's highest earnings ever in a single-event season. Another first came in 1987 at the NFR where the team won their 4th world championship with earnings exceeding $120,000. That same year, James became the first woman ever to wear the No. 1 back number in a National Finals Rodeo. The back number indicates a contestant's ranking in money earnings at the end of the regular season. In 1988, the pair won their 5th world championship with earnings of $130,540—the most money earned that year by anyone in professional rodeo competition, exceeding the earnings won by the men's all-around world champion.

In 1989, Scamper sustained a cut to his coronet band at the beginning of the NFR. James recalled how the wound forced her to change Scamper's normal conditioning routine, which cost the pair a few wins in the go-rounds but they still won the world championship title with $96,651 in season earnings. In 1993, the pair qualified again for the NFR, with James having her sights set on a tenth WPRA world championship title. She recalled how anxious she felt under such pressure, and that she wanted to win so she could retire Scamper undefeated while he was still in his prime. The pair won both the 1993 NFR and WPRA world championship titles, securing Scamper's place in barrel racing history. In 1992, James was inducted into the National Cowgirl Museum and Hall of Fame, honoring not only her multiple consecutive wins, but also topping the men in earnings.

James returned to barrel racing in 1992 riding her new horse Cruising on Six, nicknamed Cruiser, and won her 11th WPRA World Barrel Racing Championship title. Guy Clifton, sports writer for the Reno Gazette-Journal and ESPN.com remarked: "Anybody that doubted her abilities, she just proved her abilities by winning with another horse."

=== The bridleless win ===
James and Scamper during the bridleless win

In 1985, James and Scamper qualified for the NFR and won five go-rounds at the event. James recalled that it was Friday the 13th during the 7th go-round of the barrel racing competition when Scamper's bridle fell off his head during the run.

As James and Scamper came in, Scamper caught his bridle on the gate, dislodging the Chicago screws that secure the bit and reins to the headstall. With no screws to keep the bridle intact, the headstall fell off the horse's head after rounding the first barrel, and was hanging from the horse's mouth as they ran toward the second barrel. James did what she could to keep the bit in his mouth, but had to turn his head loose as they approached the third barrel. Rounding the third barrel, Scamper spit the bit out of his mouth causing the bridle to drop to his chest, but he was intensely focused on the home stretch and kept running. All James had to control him was a single rein around his neck. The pair crossed the timer clocking in at 14.4 seconds, winning the round and the 1985 World Barrel Racing Championship.

== Retirement ==
James retired Scamper in 1993, except for an occasional race, and he died on July 4, 2012, at age 35. Scamper received the 1992 AQHA Silver Spur Award which is "the equine world's equivalent of the Academy Award". James announced her retirement from competition in 2003 after winning a record 11 WPRA World Championships. She began hosting barrel racing clinics. She also has trained horses for cutting and team roping as well as barrel racing.

On December 6, 2004, James got married in the small town of Athens, Texas, which is about 1 1/2 hours outside Dallas. The groom was her long-time friend and business manager, Tony Garritano. The couple has two sons together. When James is not traveling to teach in her barrel racing clinics, she spends her time at home in Boerne, Texas. She splits her time between raising her sons or working with her colts.

She came out of retirement to compete in RFD-TV's The American, referred to as the "world's richest one day rodeo", whose inaugural event was held in 2014. The event is held every year in February at AT&T Stadium in Arlington, Texas, and televised nationally on RFD-TV. In 2016, she again stepped out of retirement as a member of Elite Rodeo Athletes (ERA) to compete in "the inaugural ERA Premier Tour against 87 other world-class athletes that represent 135 world championship titles", held May 20–21 at Tingley Coliseum in Albuquerque, New Mexico.

== Clayton ==
Since breeding Scamper was not an option for genetic inheritability, James spent several years researching the possibility of cloning. She chose ViaGen, an animal genetics corporation based in Austin, Texas, to perform the cloning procedure for $150,000. James registered the resulting colt born in 2006 with the American DNA Registry under the name Clayton, who is an identical genetic match to Scamper. James chose a surrogate mare to be the dam of the colt and receive the cloned embryo. At age two, James started Clayton as a breeding stallion. She offered his services to the public at a fee of $4,000. Clayton sired healthy progeny, many of whom have inherited Scamper's genetics. Of special note, the AQHA does not register cloned horses. However, breed registration is not required to compete in barrel racing or other PRCA and WPRA sanctioned rodeo events.

== Career earnings ==
The NFR takes place on 10 consecutive days. At the end of the NFR, there are two barrel racing champions: the World Champion, who completed the year by earning the most money during the season and the finals combined; and the Average champion, who won the NFR by having the best aggregate time. It is possible the two champions may be the same person.

The WPRA has recorded the following earnings for James:

- 1984 – $53,499
- 1985 – $93,847
- 1986 – $151,969
- 1986 – Leading money earner in professional rodeo
- 1987 – 1987 – $120,002
- 1988 – $130,540
- 1989 – $96,651
- 1990 – $130,328
- 1990 – Charmayne crosses the million-dollar milestone
- 1991 – $92,403
- 1992 – $110,867
- 1993 – $103,609
- 1995 – $50,345
- 1996 – $49,995
- 1997 – $54,442
- 1998 – $116,325
- 1999 – $88,520
- 2000 – $146,000
- 2001 – $129,270
- 2002 – $186,405

== Honors ==
- 1986 Panhandle Sports Hall of Fame, Amarillo, Texas
- 1988 Ellensburg Rodeo Hall of Fame
- 1992 National Cowgirl Museum and Hall of Fame
- 1996 "Scamper" inducted into ProRodeo Hall of Fame
- 1999 St. Paul Rodeo Hall of Fame
- 2002 Texas Cowboy Hall of Fame
- 2011 Texas Rodeo Cowboy Hall of Fame
- 2016 New Mexico Sports Hall of Fame
- 2017 ProRodeo Hall of Fame
- 2024 RodeoHouston Hall of Fame
- 2026 PBR Ty Murray Top Hand Award
