= Billy Bob's Texas =

Nightclub in Texas, United States

- The World's Largest Honky Tonk
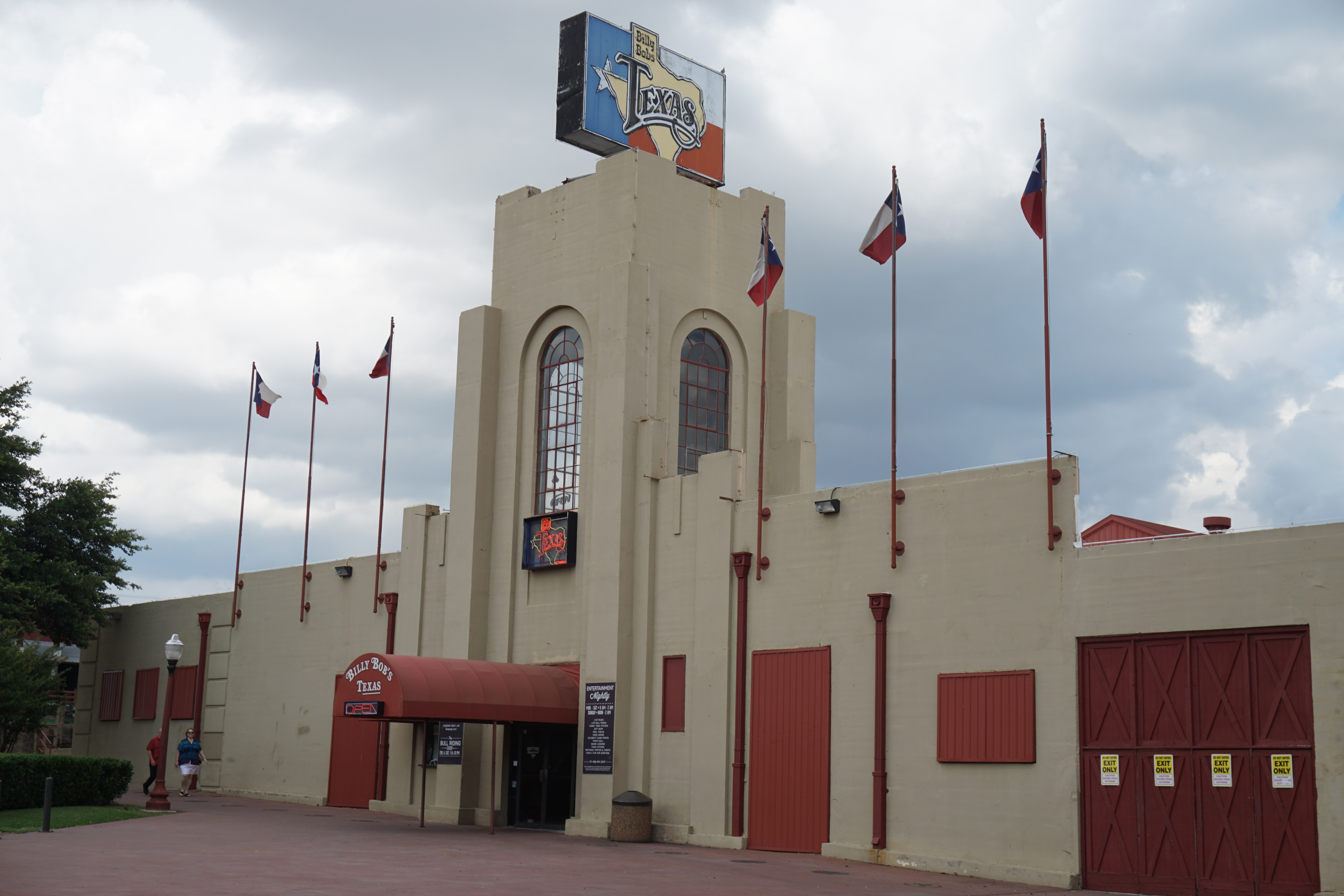
- The front of Billy Bob's Texas
- Interactive map of Billy Bob's Texas
- Address: 2520 Rodeo Plaza
- Location: Fort Worth, Texas
- Coordinates: 32°47′29″N 97°20′53″W
- Owner: Billy Bob's Texas, LLC
- Capacity: 6,000+
- Type: Nightclub
- Event: Country

Construction
- Opened: April 1, 1981

Website
- billybobstexas.com

Billy Bob's Texas is a country music nightclub located in the Fort Worth Stockyards, Texas, United States. It promotes itself as "The World's Largest Honky Tonk," at 100,000 square feet of interior space and nearly 20 acres of parking space.

== History ==
Billy Bob Barnett, a Texas A&M University graduate and professional football player, teamed up with nightclub owner and former car salesman, Spencer Taylor. While looking for a location to fit their idea, the men decided upon an abandoned 100,000-square-foot department store that was at one time an open-air cattle barn. With some additional investors, Barnett and Taylor renovated the building's interior and exterior and opened the place to the public on April 1, 1981. Billy Bob's closed in January 1988, and reopened in October 1988 under new ownership and management. Holt Hickman, Don Jury, Steve Murrin and Billy Minick formed the new ownership group.

Mostly known for country music, the venue has also hosted acts such as Bob Hope and B.B. King.

In 1983, Merle Haggard, while on stage, offered each person in the crowd of 5,095 a C.C. Waterback (a one-ounce Canadian Club Whisky with a water chaser) in honor of his song of that name. The drinks totaled 40 gallons and at the time, cost $12,737.50. The stunt earned Haggard a place in the Guinness Book of World Records as the purchaser of the biggest round ever.

Billy Bob's Texas has been named "Country Music Club of the Year" 12 times by the Academy of Country Music and the Country Music Association.

Billy Bob's Texas celebrated its 35th anniversary in 2016. The celebration culminated in November with a weekend of shows from Shooter Jennings, Rival Sons and Willie Nelson.

== Features ==
In addition to the concert stage where the artists perform, Billy Bob's Texas also has a dance floor, several bar stations, several pool tables, a restaurant, an arcade, a gift shop, a wall of fame filled with the handprints in concrete of past Billy Bob's performers, music memorabilia, and a small dirt arena where professional bull riding is held on the weekends during concert days.

Private events are also held at the venue.

== Live at Billy Bob's Texas Music Series ==
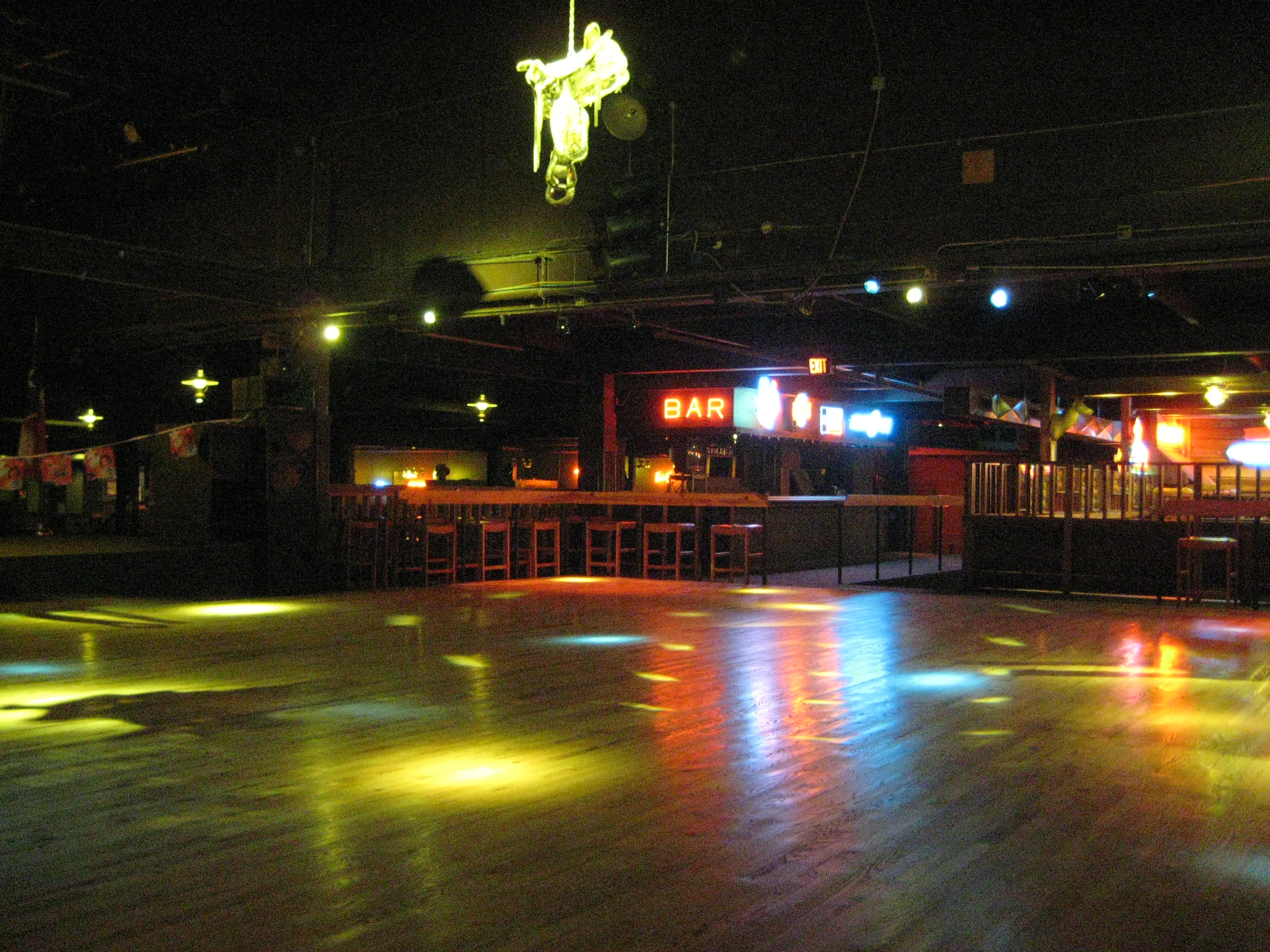
The dance floor at Billy Bob's Texas

Since 1999, the Smith Music Group, a music publishing company in Fort Worth, Texas has issued a continuing series of live albums recorded by major country music artists at Billy Bob's. The albums are titled Live at Billy Bob's Texas, with a few exceptions. The list is currently over forty performances. Artists so far have included:

- Lynn Anderson
- Asleep at the Wheel
- Moe Bandy & Joe Stampley
- Jason Boland & the Stragglers
- Wade Bowen
- Toadies
- T. Graham Brown
- Roy Clark
- Roger Clyne and the Peacemakers
- David Allan Coe
- John Conlee
- Earl Thomas Conley
- Cooder Graw
- Cross Canadian Ragweed
- Charlie Daniels Band
- Joe Diffie
- Deryl Dodd
- Bleu Edmondson
- Exile
- Kevin Fowler
- Janie Fricke
- The Gatlin Brothers
- Josh Grider
- Pat Green
- Merle Haggard
- Jack Ingram
- Shooter Jennings
- Stoney LaRue
- Johnny Lee
- Justin McBride
- Cory Morrow
- Micky & the Motorcars
- Michael Martin Murphey
- Willie Nelson
- No Justice
- Eddy Raven
- Collin Raye
- Brandon Rhyder
- Charlie Robison
- Randy Rogers Band
- Billy Joe Shaver
- T. G. Sheppard
- Gary Stewart
- Doug Stone
- Jackson Taylor & The Sinners
- Tanya Tucker
- Josh Ward
- Mark Wills

== In popular culture ==
Billy Bob's Texas has also been host to many movie and television projects. Baja Oklahoma (Willie Nelson, Lesley Ann Warren), Over the Top (Sylvester Stallone), and Necessary Roughness (Scott Bakula, Sinbad) have all been filmed there.

Billy Bob's is used extensively playing itself during location filming for several episodes in Season 7 of the original TV series Dallas.

Professional wrestling was also filmed at the venue in the mid to late 1980s.
