= Texas Cowboy Hall of Fame =

Hall of Fame for Cowboys

- Established: 1997
- Location: 2515 Rodeo Plaza, Fort Worth, TX 76164
- Coordinates: 32.7886°N 97.3468°W
- Type: Hall of fame
- Website: TCHoF

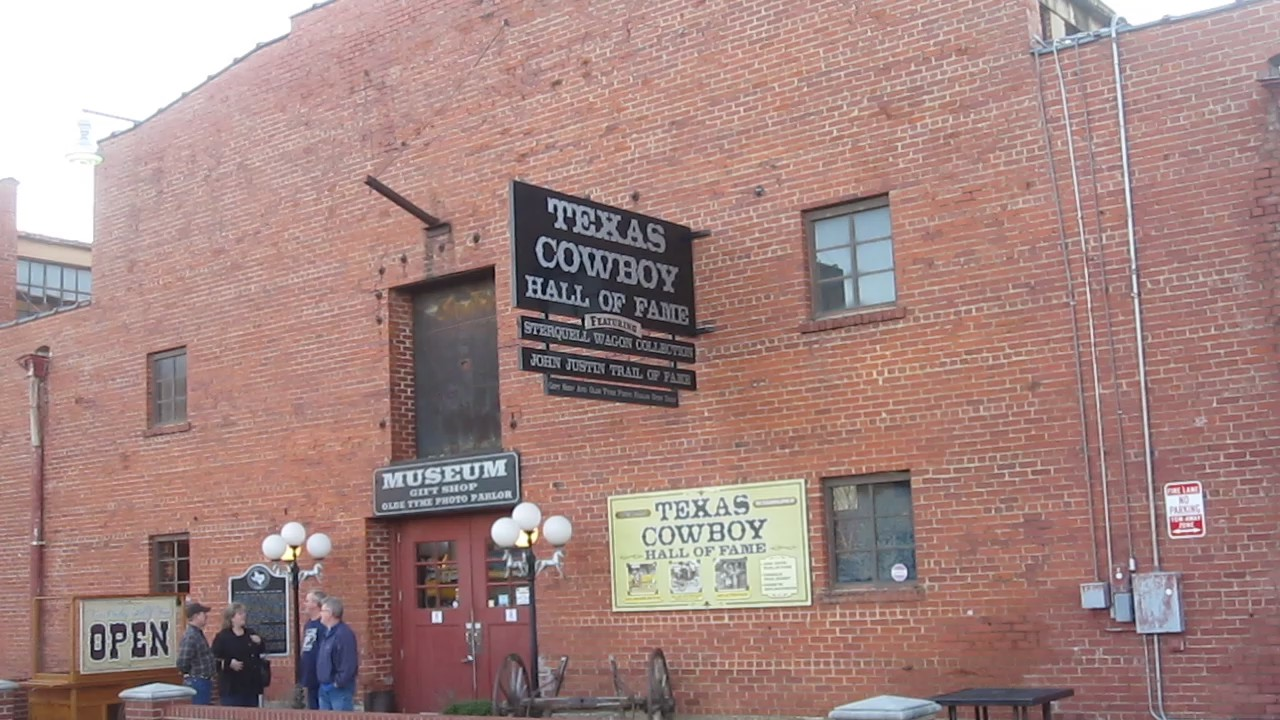
Entrance to the Texas Cowboy Hall of Fame at the Fort Worth Stockyards

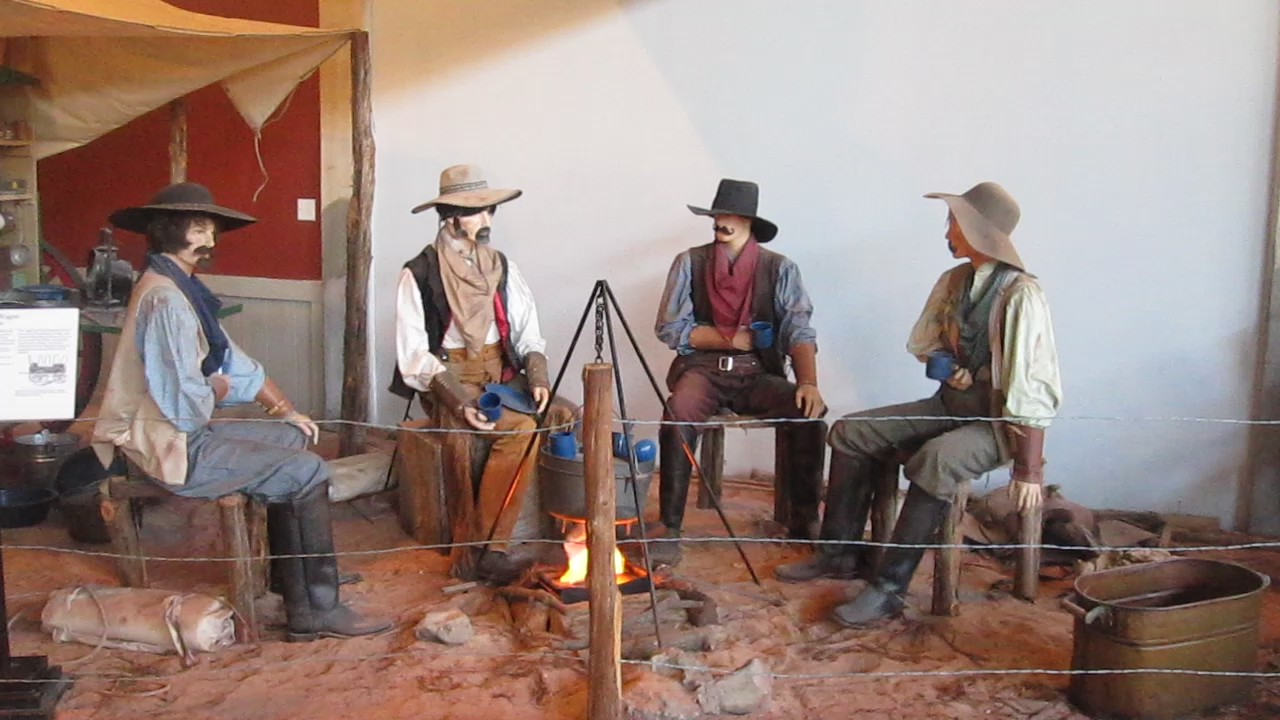
Simulated campfire scene in the Texas Cowboy Hall of Fame in Fort Worth, Texas

The Texas Cowboy Hall of Fame is a western, historical museum in Fort Worth, Texas, United States that "honors those men and women who have shown excellence in the business and support of rodeo and the western lifestyle in Texas."

The Hall of Fame includes over 125 cowboys and cowgirls, each of whom has a booth to display personal memorabilia. The museum, located in Historic Barn A, is also home to The Sterquell Wagon Collection, John Justin Trail of Fame, Chisholm Trail Exhibit, The Applewhite-Clark Exhibit, Adventures of the Cowboy Trail, Zigrang Horse Bit Collection, Amon G. Carter's 1933 Cadillac and The Jersey Lilly Old-Tyme Photo Parlour.

== History ==
The Hall of Fame was established in 1997 and its original purpose was to recognize excellent horsemen and women. In 2001, the hall moved to the Fort Worth Stockyards National Historic District. Today the hall recognizes individuals from all facets of rodeo and western lifestyle. The building housing it is one of the horse and mule barns in the Fort Worth Stockyards. Originally built in 1888, they housed over 3,000 horses and mules.

The original wooden ones that stood in this location were lost March 14, 1911, when a spark from a passing train ignited a fire. They were rebuilt and completed in March 1912 and considered the first "fireproof" ones. The bricks, columns, metal doors, catwalks, and cinder blocks are all original architecture. The Hall of Fame is located in the heart of the historic Fort Worth Stockyards.

== Inductees ==
Inductee	Year inducted
Guy Allen	2001-2008
Joe Beaver	2001-2008
Lindy Burch	2001-2008
Wanda Bush	2001-2008
Craig Cameron	2001-2008
Gilbert Carrillo	2001-2008
Roy Cooper	2001-2008
Quail Dobbs	2001-2008
Dr. J. Pat Evans	2001-2008
Clyde Frost	2001-2008
Debbie Garrison	2001-2008
D.J. Kajun Kidd Gaudin	2001-2008
Neal Gay	2001-2008
Helen Groves	2001-2008
Tuff Hedeman	2001-2008
Charmayne James	2001-2008
Jerry Jetton	2001-2008
Martha Josey	2001-2008
Ed Knocke	2001-2008
Cody Lambert	2001-2008
Phil Lyne	2001-2008
Larry Mahan	2001-2008
Pam Minick	2001-2008
Tom Moorhouse	2001-2008
Jimmie Gibbs Munroe	2001-2008
Ty Murray	2001-2008
Willie Nelson	2001-2008
Louis Pearce, Jr.	2001-2008
Mitzi Lucas Riley	2001-2008
Carol Rose	2001-2008
Jim Sharp	2001-2008
George Strait	2001-2008
JW Stoker	2001-2008
Buck Taylor	2001-2008
Tooter Waites	2001-2008
Bob Watt, Jr.	2001-2008
Buster Welch	2001-2008
Greg Welch	2001-2008
Speed Williams	2001-2008
Tee Woolman	2001-2008
Dave Appleton	2001-2008
Trevor Brazile	2001-2008
Stanley Bush	2001-2008
Jim Bynum	2001-2008
Adam Carrillo	2001-2008
Everett Colborn	2001-2008
George Doak	2001-2008
Don Edwards	2001-2008
Kay Floyd	2001-2008
Lane Frost	2001-2008
Walt Garrison	2001-2008
Don Gay	2001-2008
Kay Gay	2001-2008
J.J. Hampton	2001-2008
Monty "Hawkeye" Henson	2001-2008
Brett Hoffman	2001-2008
Bernis Johnson	2001-2008
R.E. Josey	2001-2008
Light Crust Doughboys	2001-2008
Tad Lucas	2001-2008
Tom Lyons	2001-2008
Billy Minick	2001-2008
Bob Moorhouse	2001-2008
Mike Mowrey	2001-2008
Bud Munroe	2001-2008
Carl Nafzger	2001-2008
Cody Ohl	2001-2008
Fay Ramsey	2001-2008
Lanham Riley	2001-2008
Matlock Rose	2001-2008
Rich Skelton	2001-2008
Red Steagall	2001-2008
Bob Tallman	2001-2008
Harry Tompkins	2001-2008
W.R. Watt	2001-2008
Guy Weeks	2001-2008
Sheila Welch	2001-2008
Fred Whitfield	2001-2008
Kobie Wood	2001-2008
Barry Corbin	2009
Tyler Magnus	2009
Ken Welch	2009
Jim Bob Altizer	2009
Tommy Lee Jones	2009
Rope Myers	2009
Nolan Ryan	2010
Dean Smith	2010
Dr. James H. Red Duke, Jr.	2010
James Jennings	2010
Tom Reeves	2010
The Warvell Family	2010
Myrtis Dightman	2011
Jack Ward	2011
Jerry Diaz	2011
Tom Lucas	2011
George Paul	2012
Buddy Jeffers & Jim Odie	2012
Lyle Lovett	2012
Vernon Dude Smith	2012
Sandy Kirby	2013
Tommy Steiner	2013
Dr. Tandy Freeman, III	2013
Edwards Family & Edwards Ranch	2013
Bobby Norris	2014
Walt Woodard	2014
Anne Marion & The Four Sixes	2014
David & Stacie McDavid	2014
Chris Cox	2015
Larry Mahan	2015
Leon Coffee	2015
Clay Walker	2015
Johnny Trotter	2015
C.W. Cascio	2016
Justin McBride	2016
Jack Brainard	2016
Dr. Charles Graham	2016
Pete Bonds	2017
Dr. Jim Heird	2017
Ricky Bolin	2017
Bill Casner	2017
The Luskey Family	2018
Gerald Sullivan	2018
John, Punk & Roy Carter	2018
Adriano Moraes	2018
Dr. Glenn Blodgett	2019
The Cavender Family	2019
Fort Worth Stock Show and Rodeo	2019
King Ranch	2019
Robert Earl Keen	2019
Charles & Kit Moncrief	2020
Lari Dee Guy	2020
The Priefert Family	2020
R.H. Steve Stevens Jr.	2020
Aaron Watson	2020
Stran and Jennifer Smith	2021
Bobby Kerr	2021
Bob Wills	2021
Taylor Sheridan	2021
Keith Maddox	2021
Bobby Cox	2021
Scharbauer Cattle	2022
Cody Johnson	2022
Wilson Franklin	2022
Patti Colbert	2022
Dr. Charles "Bud" Townsend	2022
Moe Bandy	2023
Texas Ranger Division of the Department of Safety	2023
Cleo Hearn	2023
San Antonio Stock Show and Rodeo	2023
Boots O'Neal	2023
Fallon Taylor	2024
Ray Benson	2024
George David Scott III	2024
Skeeter Hagler	2024
Tomas Garcilazo	2024
RW Hampton	2025
Mary Walker and Byron Walker	2025
Billy Klapper	2025
Jo Ellard	2025
Josh Edwards	2025

== See also ==
- List of museums in North Texas
- National Cowboy and Western Heritage Museum in Oklahoma
