= Addington, Oklahoma =

- Town
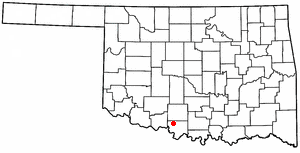
- Location of Addington, Oklahoma
- Coordinates: 34°14′35″N 97°58′00″W
- Country: United States
- State: Oklahoma
- County: Jefferson

Area
  - Total: 0.24 sq mi (0.61 km^{2})
  - Land: 0.24 sq mi (0.61 km^{2})
  - Water: 0 sq mi (0.00 km^{2})
- Elevation: 951 ft (290 m)

Population (2020)
  - Total: 83
  - Density: 350.5/sq mi (135.31/km^{2})
- Time zone: UTC-6 (Central (CST))
  - Summer (DST): UTC-5 (CDT)
- ZIP code: 73520
- Area code: 580
- FIPS code: 40-00450
- GNIS feature ID: 2412334

Addington is a town in Jefferson County, Oklahoma, United States. The population was 83 as of the 2020 United States census.

== History ==
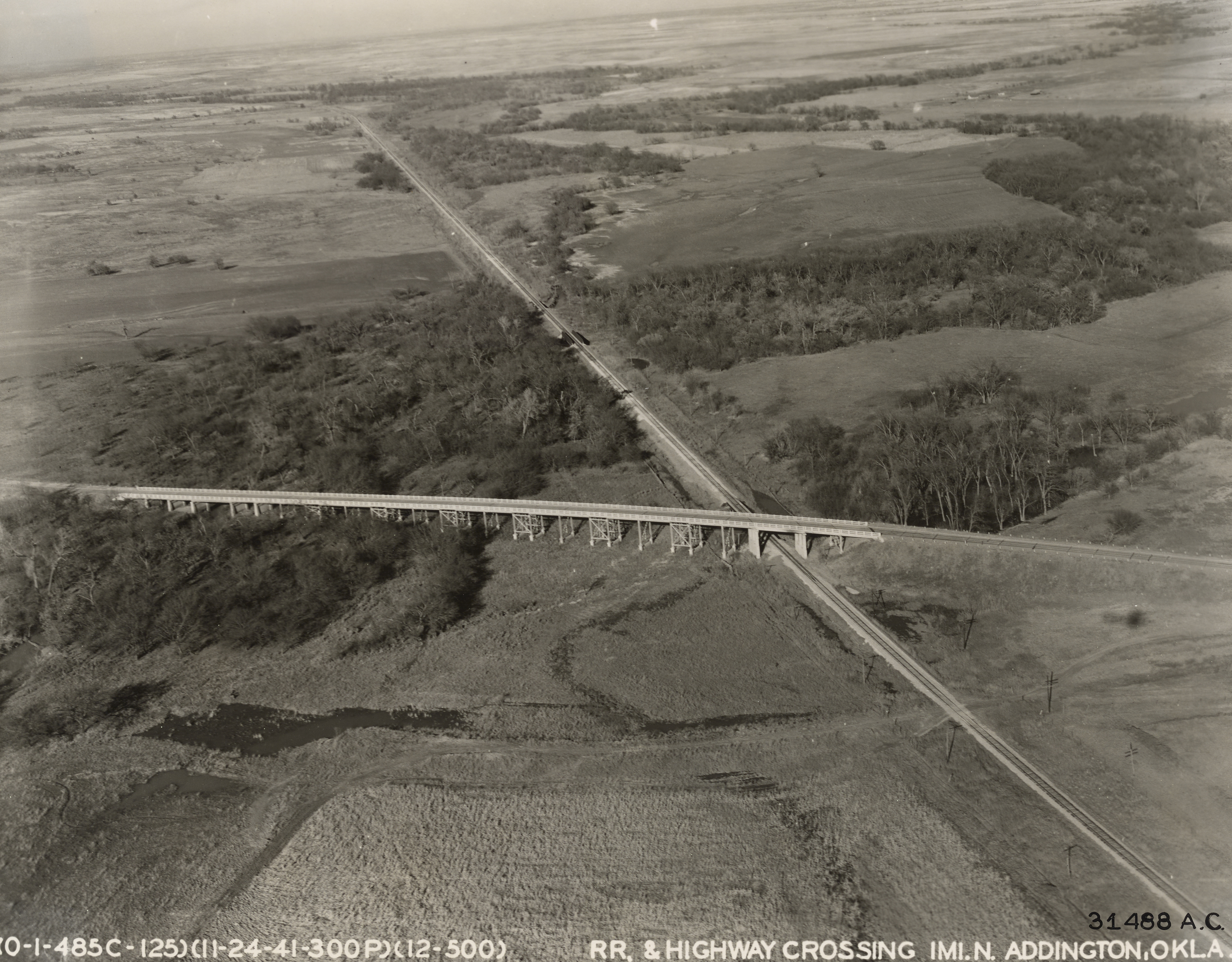
US 81 bridge over the Chicago & Rock Island RR in 1941

The town was founded in 1890. Its post office was established on January 8, 1896, and was named after its first postmaster, James P. Addington.

The town was not formally incorporated until 1901. Addington's growth was helped by being located on the line of the Chicago, Rock Island and Pacific Railroad, and its population peaked circa 1915, with 1,000 citizens. However, the town's population has undergone a steady decline since that time. Nevertheless, despite threats of closure over the years, the post office in Addington remains open.

Former newspapers were the Addington Free Lance, the Addington Advertiser, the Addington Journal, and the Addington Herald.

== Geography ==
Addington is located 6 miles (9.7 km) north and 2 miles (3.2 km) west of Waurika.

According to the United States Census Bureau, the town has a total area of 0.2 square miles (0.52 km^{2}), all land.

== Demographics ==
Historical population
Census	Pop.	Note	%±
1910	493		—
1920	368		−25.4%
1930	318		−13.6%
1940	250		−21.4%
1960	144		—
1970	123		−14.6%
2000	117		—
2010	114		−2.6%
2020	83		−27.2%
U.S. Decennial Census

=== 2020 census ===
As of the 2020 census, Addington had a population of 83. The median age was 48.5 years. 19.3% of residents were under the age of 18 and 25.3% of residents were 65 years of age or older. For every 100 females there were 107.5 males, and for every 100 females age 18 and over there were 86.1 males age 18 and over.

0.0% of residents lived in urban areas, while 100.0% lived in rural areas.

There were 44 households in Addington, of which 45.5% had children under the age of 18 living in them. Of all households, 45.5% were married-couple households, 20.5% were households with a male householder and no spouse or partner present, and 29.5% were households with a female householder and no spouse or partner present. About 9.1% of all households were made up of individuals and 2.3% had someone living alone who was 65 years of age or older.

There were 51 housing units, of which 13.7% were vacant. The homeowner vacancy rate was 0.0% and the rental vacancy rate was 0.0%.

Racial composition as of the 2020 census
Race	Number	Percent
White	73	88.0%
Black or African American	2	2.4%
American Indian and Alaska Native	5	6.0%
Asian	0	0.0%
Native Hawaiian and Other Pacific Islander	0	0.0%
Some other race	2	2.4%
Two or more races	1	1.2%
Hispanic or Latino (of any race)	6	7.2%
