= Barrel racing =

Competitive equestrian rodeo sport

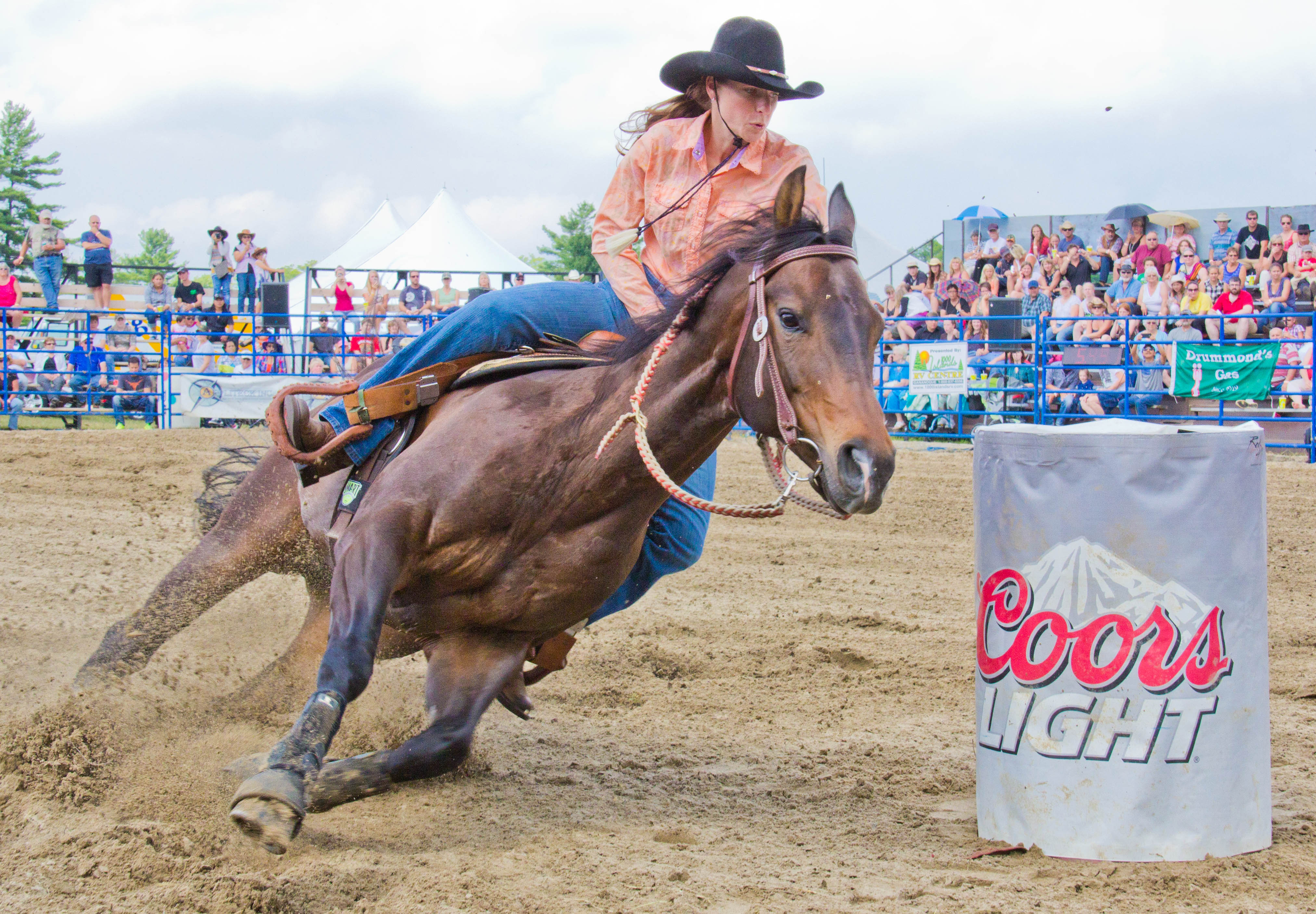
- Nicknames: Barrels, chasing cans

Characteristics
- Mixed-sex: Generally women and girls, some men and boys at local and youth levels
- Type: Rodeo; Gymkhana/O-Mok-See
- Equipment: Horse, horse tack
- Venue: Indoor or outdoor riding arena

Barrel racing is a rodeo event in which a horse and rider attempt to run around preset barrels in the fastest time. In collegiate and professional ranks, it is usually a women's event, though both sexes compete at amateur and youth levels. It requires a combination of the horse's athletic ability and the horsemanship skills of a rider in order to safely and successfully maneuver the horse around three barrels placed in a triangle pattern within a large arena.

== History ==
Barrel racing originally developed as an event for women. In early barrel racing, the pattern alternated between a figure-eight and a cloverleaf pattern. The figure-eight was eventually dropped in favor of the more difficult cloverleaf.

It is believed that competitive barrel racing was first held in Texas. The Women's Professional Rodeo Association (WPRA) was founded in 1948 by a group of women from Texas who were trying to find a place for women in the wider sport of rodeo. When it began, the WPRA was called the Girls Rodeo Association (GRA). It consisted of 74 members, with about 60 approved tour events. The Girls Rodeo Association was the first body of rodeo developed specifically for women. The GRA changed its name to Women's Professional Rodeo Association in 1981, and the WPRA still provides women competition opportunities in several rodeo events, but barrel racing remains the most popular. Even so, the sport of barrel racing is played by large numbers of both boys and girls, especially in rural and remote areas.

== Modern event ==
Today, barrel racing is a part of most rodeos, and is also included at gymkhana or O-Mok-See events, which are generally amateur competitions open to riders of all ages and abilities. In amateur competition other related speed events (such as keyhole race and pole bending) may be added. Barrel racing at this level is usually an event in which riders are grouped by age. There are also open barrel racing jackpots, some open to all contestants no matter their age or gender.

The main purpose of barrel racing is to run a set pattern as fast as possible. The times are measured either by an electric eye, a device using a laser system to record times, or by a judge who drops a flag to let the timer know when to start and stop the clock. Judges and timers are more commonly seen in local and non-professional events. The timer begins when horse and rider cross the starting line, and ends when the barrel pattern has been successfully executed and horse and rider cross the finish line. Success depends on several factors, most commonly the horse's physical and mental condition, the rider's horsemanship abilities, and the type of ground or footing (the quality, depth, content, etc. of the sand or dirt in the arena).

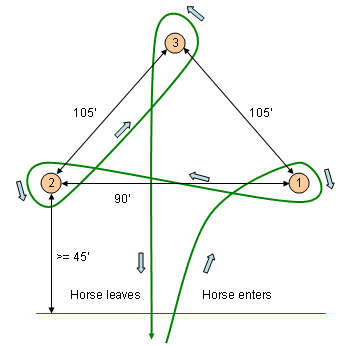
Diagram of a Barrel Racing Course. Exact distance between barrels depends on the competition circuit. Riders enter through a narrow pathway called the "shoot" and are timed by a motion sensor starting at the red line. They circle around the 1st barrel, proceed to the 2nd barrel, then to the 3rd barrel, where they end that turn in a straight line towards the shoot where they entered. They complete the pattern by crossing the motion sensor at the red line a second time, stopping the timer. This pattern is often referred to as a "Cloverleaf." The pattern may also begin with the left barrel first (purely the rider's choice), which is the above pattern, mirrored. Whether the left or right barrel is chosen as the first barrel is usually dependent on the horse. Horses are left-brained or right-brained, like humans can be right-handed and left-handed. The goal is to complete the pattern correctly and in the shortest amount of time without tipping any barrels over.

Beginning a barrel race, the horse and rider will enter the arena at top speed, through the center entrance (or alley if in a rodeo arena). Once in the arena, the electronic timer beam is crossed by the horse and rider. The timer keeps running until the beam is crossed again at the end of the run.

Modern barrel racing horses not only need to be fast, but also strong, agile, and intelligent. Strength and agility are needed to maneuver the course in as little distance as possible. A horse that is able to "hug the barrels" as well as maneuver the course quickly and accurately follow commands, is more likely to be successful with consistently fast times.

== Rules and pattern ==
In barrel racing, the fastest time wins. Running past a barrel and off the pattern will result in a "no time" score and disqualification. If a barrel racer or her horse hits a barrel and knocks it over there is a time penalty of five seconds (sometimes more), which usually will result in a time too slow to win. There is a sixty-second time limit to complete the course after time begins. Contestants cannot be required to start a run from an off-center alleyway, but contestants are not allowed to enter the arena and "set" the horse. At professional rodeos, it is required that the arena be harrowed after twelve contestants have run. Barrels are required to be fifty-five gallons, metal, enclosed at both ends, and of at least two colors. Competitors in the National Barrel Racing Association (NBRA) are required to wear a western long-sleeved shirt (tucked in), western cut pants or jeans, western hat, and boots. Competitors are required to abide by this dress code beginning one hour before the competition.

Standard barrel racing patterns require measured distances between the start line and the first barrel, from the first to the second barrel, and from the second to the third barrel.

Usually the established distances are as follows:

- 90 feet (27 m) between barrel 1 and 2.
- 105 feet (32 m) between barrel 1 and 3 and between 2 and 3.
- 60 feet (18 m) from barrels 1 and 2 to score line.

In a standard WPRA pattern, the score line begins at the plane of arena, meaning from fence to fence regardless of the position of the electric eye or timer.

In larger arenas, there is a maximum allowable distance of 105 feet (32 m) between barrels 1 and 2, and a maximum distance of 120 feet (37 m) between barrels 2 and 3, and 1 and 3. Barrels 1 and 2 must be at least 18 feet (5.5 m) from the sides of the arena — in smaller arenas this distance may be less, but in no instance should the barrels be any closer than 15 feet (4.6 m) from the sides of the arena.

Barrel 3 should be no closer than 25 feet (7.6 m) from the end of the arena, and should be set no more than 15 feet (4.6 m) longer than the first and second barrel. If arena size permits, barrels must be set 60 feet (18 m) or further apart. In small arenas it is recommended the pattern be reduced proportionately to a standard barrel pattern.

The above pattern is the set pattern for the Women's Professional Rodeo Association (WPRA), and The National Intercollegiate Rodeo Association (NIRA).

The National Barrel Horse Association (NBHA) use the following layout for governing patterns:

- A minimum of 15 feet (4.6 m) between each of the first two barrels and the side fence.
- A minimum of 30 feet (9.1 m) between the third barrel and the back fence.
- A minimum of 30 feet (9.1 m) between the time line and the first barrel.

=== Competition technique ===
The approach to the first barrel is particularly critical. The rider can decide whether to go to the left or the right barrel first, typically dependent on the horse. Each turn in barrel racing is, ideally, a relatively even half-circle around the barrel that takes about three strides. It is best to use the inside leg while going around the first half of a barrel, and the outside leg in the second half. In approaching the second barrel, the horse must do a flying change of lead and rider must identify the correct spot to approach the turn around the second barrel. The turn around the third and final barrel is in the same direction as the second barrel. Completing the third and final turn, horse and rider race for "home", the line that stops the timer and ends the run.

As the horse sets up to take the turn, the rider must be in position as well, sitting deeply in the saddle, using the inside hand to guide the horse through and around the barrel turn. The rider's leg to the inside of the turn is held securely along the girth to support the horse's rib cage and give them a focal point for the turn. The athleticism required for this maneuvering comes from optimum physical fitness of the rider and especially the horse. Improper preparation for such a sport can cause injury to both horse and rider. Injury can be avoided by using the proper protection for both horse and rider.

== Associations and sanctioning bodies ==
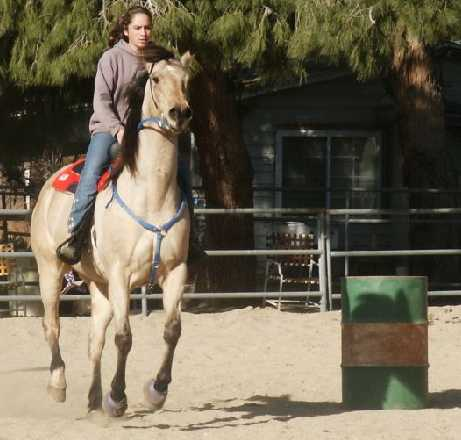
Training the pattern

Since its beginnings, the sport has developed into an organized, well-governed sport. The main sanctioning body of professional female rodeo athletes is the Women's Professional Rodeo Association. The WPRA has over 800 sanctioned tour events with an annual payout of more than $3 million. The WPRA is divided into twelve divisional circuits. Average and overall winners from their circuit compete at the NFR Open. In the United States, two national organizations promote events for barrel racing alone: the National Barrel Horse Association and Better Barrel Races. The WPRA is co-sanctioned with the Professional Rodeo Cowboys Association (PRCA) to allow women to compete in PRCA-endorsed rodeos. Without the co-sanction, barrel racing would be removed from PRCA rodeos and the National Finals Rodeo (NFR). The WPRA world champion barrel racer is decided at the NFR. Barrel racing has been part of the NFR since 1967.

== Horses ==
The American Quarter Horse is the most commonly used horse breed.

Purchase price of a high caliber barrel racing horse can easily reach $250,000, depending on the ability and individuality of the horse. While breeding is one major influence in the sale price of a horse, athletic ability, intelligence and drive, as well as the overall state of the economy, all play a role. Prices can vary a great deal depending on market conditions. The highest-selling barrel racing horse sold at a public auction in 2009 sold for $68,000.

== Tack and equipment ==
There are no specific bits required for barrel racing, although some bits are more common to barrel racers. The type used is determined by an individual horse's needs. Bits with longer shanks cause the horse to stop quicker than normal due to the additional leverage on the poll and jaw, while bits with shorter shanks provide better control for turns. Curb chains, nosebands, and tiedowns are used as needed.

Typically, reins used in barrel racing competitions are a single looped rein. This allows the rider the ability to quickly recover the reins if dropped, unlike split reins. Leather reins are widely used. These can be flat or braided, but both varieties have a tendency to become slippery when wet. Reins made of synthetic materials are also available.

A lightweight western saddle with a high pommel and cantle is ideal. Forward hung stirrups also help to keep the rider's feet in proper position. Typically, riders choose a saddle that is up to a full size smaller than he or she would normally use. Most importantly, it must fit the rider's horse properly. Saddle pads and cinches are chosen based on the horse's size.

== Camas Prairie Stump Race ==
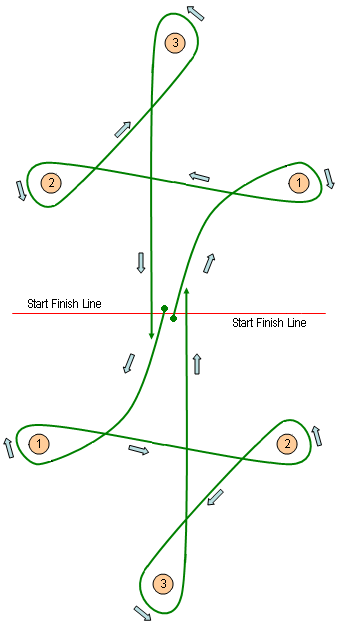
Camas Prairie Stump Race course

The Camas Prairie Stump Race is a barrel race which is also a match race: two horses race against each other on identical circuits opposite the start-finish line; the riders start beside each other facing in opposite directions, and the first horse and rider back across the line win the race. The races continue until all but the last is eliminated. It is not a timed event. It is one of five game classes approved for horse club shows by the Appaloosa Horse Club. The ApHC rules state that racing competition is traditional to the Nez Perce Native American people. However, it is unclear if this particular competition is derived from any traditional competition.

== Injury issues ==
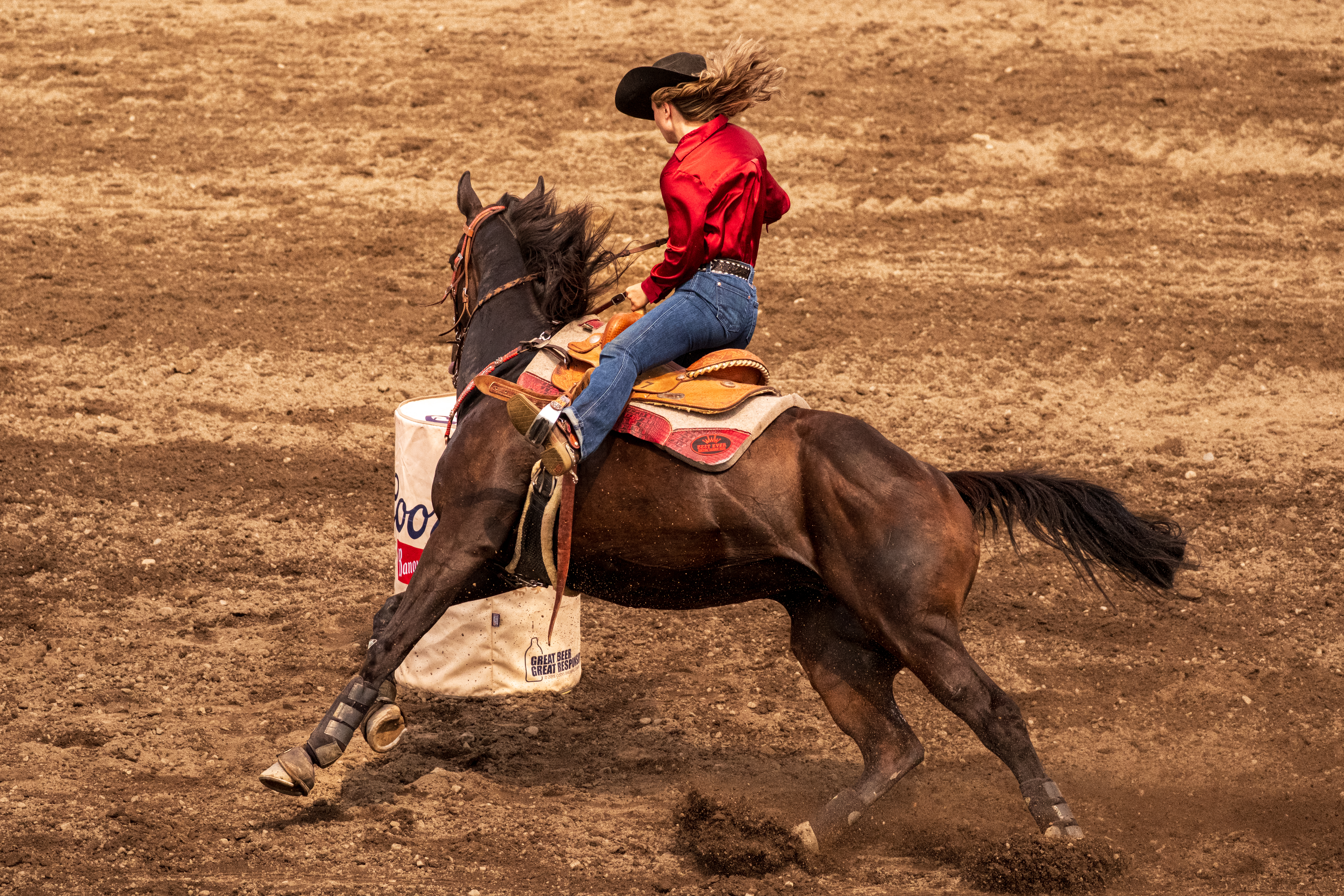
Barrel racing horse wearing protective leg boots.

Commonly, protective boots are worn on the horse's front and hind legs to decrease the risk of potential injury. Injuries can occur when horses or riders collide with a barrel, fall on a sharp turn, or have an accident in the crowded gate area outside of the arena. Although equestrian helmets are not traditionally worn by riders, their use is slowly increasing, particularly since one championship-level rider debuted helmet use at the 2014 National Finals Rodeo.

The metacarpophalangeal joint is the most frequently injured area in barrel horses. Owing to the nature of the tight turns of the pattern and abrupt changes of speed, the right forelimb appears to be subjected to more stress than the left, yet in radiographs, the left shows more abnormalities. At the fetlock, the medial sesamoid bones are more likely to suffer inflammation than the lateral. Over time, some horses develop osteoarthritis. There are few studies on lameness in barrel horses, and most only examined horses known to be lame.
