= Bodacious (bull) =

American bucking bull (1988–2000)

- Breed: Charbray
- Sex: Bull
- Born: 1988; Longdale, Oklahoma, U.S.
- Died: May 16, 2000 (aged 11–12); Red River County, Texas, U.S.
- Nationality: United States
- Years active: 1992–1995
- Owner: Andrews Rodeo Company
- Weight: 1900 lb (860 kg)
- Appearance: Bright Yellow
- Awards: PBR World Champion Bull; 1995; PRCA Bucking Bull of the Year; 1994, 1995; PRCA Texas Circuit Bull of the Year; 1993, 1995; PRCA Bucking Bull of the NFR; 1992, 1994, 1995

Bodacious #J-31 (1988 – May 16, 2000) was an American bucking bull. He was known throughout the rodeo world as "the world's most dangerous bull". He was also known as "the greatest bull ever to buck". During his rodeo career, he was the 1994 and 1995 Professional Rodeo Cowboy Association (PRCA) Bucking Bull of the Year, as well as the 1995 PBR World Champion Bull. He and Bruiser are the only bulls who have won bucking bull world championship titles in both organizations.

Bodacious is best known for his serious injury to bull riding icon Tuff Hedeman. Not long after, Bodacious also seriously injured Scott Breding. His owner, Sammy Andrews, then retired Bodacious. In 1999, Bodacious was inducted into the ProRodeo Hall of Fame, and in 2017 into the Bull Riding Hall of Fame. In 2019, the PBR inducted Bodacious into the Brand of Honor, which is part of the PBR's Heroes and Legends Celebration, the PBR's unique way of honoring outstanding individuals and livestock in the sport of rodeo.

In 2023, Bodacious was ranked No. 30 on the list of the top 30 bulls in PBR history.

== Early life ==
Bodacious, born in 1988 on the Kephart Ranch in the Longdale of Oklahoma, was a Charolais/Brahman crossbred known as a Charbray. Bodacious was born a unique yellow color, which was the only thing that distinguished him from the rest of the herd, most of whom were gray-blues and creams. Bill McCann, co-owner of Geary Livestock Auction, near Okeene, Oklahoma, regularly bought cattle from the Kephart Ranch and resold them at auction. In one of the loads he bought, he remembered a yellow calf.

He branded the then-unnamed Bodacious with "J" for his first initial. When the young bull was three years old, Kephart decided Bodacious wasn't what he wanted in a herd bull. When Phil Sumner, a rodeo stock contractor, showed up to see another bull, Kephart offered to throw in "the yellow bull". Sumner paid Kephard about 50 cents a pound, "the going rate for beef on the hoof". It worked out to $700. Sumner took Kephart's "J" brand and extended it to J-31: the 3 stood for the month of March, and 1 stood for 1991, the year he bought the bull. He also weighed young Bodacious at 1,200 pounds (540 kg). Sumner never named the bull either due to not feeling sure his bucking ability would give him a good chance at a rodeo career.

== Early bucking career ==
Sumner brought the skinny three-year-old bull to buck in some local rodeos in northern Oklahoma, but was not impressed with the results. At first, the bull could jump high but "couldn't seem to figure out the point" of the cowboy on his back. The first three riders easily rode until the whistle on him. "I was thinking, Dude, you're going to have to step up your game plan or you're going to be going to McDonald's," Sumner said.

But at a rodeo outside Okeene, Oklahoma, a rookie got his hand caught in his bull rope at the top of the bull's back. When the rider started flailing around the side of the bull, trying to dislodge his hand, Bodacious panicked. The bull spun, jumped, and kicked, trying to get free of the rider. He kicked so high he almost flipped over. "By the time the boy pulled free, the bull had nearly gone over the fence". "After that, he had a goal: airmail those cowboys." According to Sumner, something happened to Bodacious after that, and he decided "he didn't want anybody on him or near him". He learned more effective ways to buck people off. Old videos of Bodacious taken from age three to age five show Bodacious practicing these methods. It didn't take long until bull riders at the local amateur rodeos refused to take on the yellow bull.

== Amateur bucking career ==
=== 1991 season ===
Phil Sumner took the bull as an amateur to a few rodeo events sanctioned by the International Professional Rodeo Association (IPRA) and the PRCA in 1991. D&H Cattle Company is a well-known and respected stock contractor. However, both father Dillon Page, and son H.D. Page were both professional bull riders prior to being stock contractors and bull breeders. Later the Pages bred and hauled Bodacious' progeny. In 1991, H.D. attempted Bodacious three times. The first time Page attempted Bodacious was in Edmond, Oklahoma, in an IPRA-sanctioned rodeo. According to Page, Bodacious "smashed my face pretty good on the way up". Then Page drew the bull a second time at his hometown in Ada, Oklahoma, in a $1,000-added PRCA event. His friends convinced Page to wear a helmet this time. Page maintains that the bull got him in the face again but on the way back down instead, in the helmet. The very next weekend at Athens, Texas, he drew the bull again. Page said, "You've got to be kidding me!" Despite being hit in the face again, this time Page managed to stay on for the requisite eight seconds, but one of the judges disqualified him for a slap. A slap or any other touching of the bull with the free hand is against the rules and disqualifies the rider, even if he stays on for the required time.

Terry Don West is best known for riding the infamous bull Bodacious. He also has five world champion bull rider titles between the PRCA, IPRA and BRO. West had attempted Bodacious four times and gotten a qualified ride twice. In 1991, at a PRCA event, future two-time PRCA bull riding world champion Terry Don West rode Bodacious for West's first of two qualified rides. His ride went down in history as the first qualified ride on the as yet unknown bull, and the prize money bore that out, as West won only $181. His ride was the first qualified ride, yet it was not the first qualified professional ride.

One day when Sumner was watching the bull roam around his pasture near Goltry, Oklahoma, he realized he might have a major league bull. He contacted his friend Sammy Andrews of the Andrews Rodeo Company in Addielou, Texas, a third-generation stock contractor. Sumner sold him to Andrews in 1992 for $7,500. Andrews gave Bodacious his name, and hauled the bull to buck at rodeos for his entire professional career.

== Professional bucking career ==
=== Summary ===
Under the ownership of Sammy Andrews, Bodacious bucked professionally on the PRCA and PBR circuits. Bodacious bucked for two years in the PBR, in 1994 and 1995. He bucked for four years in the PRCA, from 1992 to 1995. He also bucked for three years in the Bull Riders Only (BRO) circuit from 1993 to 1995.

Bodacious bucked under two other names at the prime of his career. For a time, he bucked as "Skoal's Bodacious" when the Skoal tobacco company was sponsoring him. Later, he bucked as "Dodge Bodacious" when he was sponsored by Dodge Trucks as a "spokesbull." The name Dodge Bodacious even appears on some of his PRCA awards and media material. In GQ Magazine, he was described as, "the fiercest competitor of his generation...lethal, a legend, the Michael Jordan of barnyard brutes... a combination of Babe Ruth, Secretariat, and Sonny Liston."

Bodacious bucked on the PBR Premier Series at least five times, and scored over 45+ points all but one of those times. His average is 46.4 which puts him second in the ProBullStats Historical Ranking, with Dillinger still being in first place. He has an 80% buck off rate on the Premier Series alone.

Records were not kept as scrupulously in Bodacious' time, but the majority of sources say riders attempted Bodacious at least 135 times. Of those 135 attempts, around eight to ten qualified rides were made on the bull by approximately seven different cowboys. Bull riders who rode him twice include Bubba Dunn, Clint Branger, and Terry Don West. Tuff Hedeman, Greg Schossler, and Legs Stevenson each made a qualified ride on him once.

Since Bodacious' death, fans and journalists debate whether Bodacious was really the best bucking bull.

It's probably true that the bull scared cowboys into allowing themselves to be slingshotted. Every bull rider's worst fear is getting jerked down onto a bull's head, and cowboys who stayed on Bodacious beyond the first two jumps usually got hurt. Of the bull's 127 wins, more than a few were likely the result of cowboys deciding to let him... But if you ask top cowboys, the hype got hooked to a bull that deserved most of it. "I don't have fond memories of him, but Bodacious was the best ever," says Cody Lambert. Tuff, who tried the bull four times, rode him the third and almost died the fourth, says Bodacious was one of the rankest bulls of all time, even though "by the end he was basically a cheap shot artist who would Sunday punch you." Sammy says the bull's fame has to do with timing. Bodacious was a world-class athlete, but more important, he came along as TV was providing the sport with more coverage, he got tried by the best and, let's face it, he was amazing to watch... "Lord only knows, rodeo needs heroes," says Sammy. And in the big yellow bull that intimidated even the best, it has apparently found one to hold onto

=== 1992: Top Bull at the NFR ===
Bodacious bucked on the PRCA and BRO circuits this season. In 1992, soon after he bought the bull, Sammy Andrews took Bodacious to Houston, Texas, to one of the PRCA's biggest rodeos, the Houston Livestock Show and Rodeo. Hall of fame bull rider Cody Lambert was matched with Bodacious, who knocked him unconscious. Later in 1992, Bubba Dunn drew the bull in Lufkin, Texas. Since Dunn was unfamiliar with the bull, he asked Andrews about him; Andrews told him the bull had "a lot of down", which meant Dunn should watch out for the bull's head meeting up with his own. Dunn made the whistle at eight seconds and became the first rider to make a professional qualified ride on Bodacious. Two months after Dunn rode Bodacious, three-time Canadian Professional Rodeo Association (CPRA) Champion bull rider Greg Schlosser drew Bodacious in San Antonio, Texas, at a BRO event. Earlier, Lambert had warned Schlosser about Bodacious, saying that the bull was one of the baddest bulls he had been on. Schlosser had flown in all the way from Calgary, Alberta, and was undeterred after traveling so far. Schlosser made the whistle and scored 82 points on Bodacious.

Meanwhile, Bodacious had grown into his full adult weight of 1,900 pounds (860 kg). He had gained several hundred pounds since starting his career on the PRCA, and developed massive muscles including a "bulging neck". Most bulls at this weight become slower, but Bodacious did not. When he jumped up and "jerked riders onto his broad head, he did it with the full force" of his weight.

Tuff Hedeman's first attempt to ride Bodacious was in Memphis, Tennessee. He described the experience as "unbelievable," explaining, "when he left the chute his front end came up so high. I was right in the middle of him, and riding him like you have to ride a bull with a lot of downdraft. But my chest was touching his horns, and my head was right over the top of his. I couldn't keep my hand in the rope." His first attempt failed. Hedeman drew the bull a month later at a BRO event in Tampa, Florida. That time, Hedeman's hand came loose from the bull rope at five and a half seconds and though he hung on a bit longer, Bodacious threw him just before the eight-second mark.

Andrews took Bodacious to the 1992 PRCA's National Finals Rodeo (NFR) that year in Las Vegas, Nevada. Andrews was nervous about the night that Jim Sharp had drawn Bodacious. At that time, Sharp was already a two-time world champion. Sharp expected to ride this bull who was much better than average, but whose full reputation had not been established yet. After Bodacious came out of the chute, he turned back, then he threw Sharp off pretty hard because Sharp made "two-and-a-half flips in the air".

=== 1993: BRO World Finals ===
Bodacious bucked on the PRCA and BRO circuits this season. In 1993, Terry Don West attempted Bodacious again, and Bodacious bucked him off and bruised his ribs. At the National Western Stock Show and Rodeo in Denver, Colorado, Ben "Legs" Stevenson scored 93 points on Bodacious. At Bullnanza in Guthrie, Oklahoma, Clint Branger rode him for 78 points in the championship round. At the Tuff Hedeman Championship Challenge in Fort Worth, Texas, Bodacious bucked off Gilbert Carrillo in the first round and Scott Mendes in the championship round. And at Bullnanza-Nashville in Nashville, Tennessee, Bodacious bucked off Canadian rider Jason Keeley in the championship round.

Later that year, Tuff Hedeman participated in the 1993 BRO World Finals, in Long Beach, California. He remained resolute in his determination to get a qualified ride on Bodacious. "He was like a monster once he matured. Even the good guys were very scared of him. You'd see world champions ride him for a jump or two and then get off." This time, Hedeman scored 95 points on Bodacious in his third attempt on him. Hedeman felt this ride was the best in his career. He explained "the judges told me they wished I hadn't been the first guy out. They were saving some room, on the chance that there would possibly be a better ride. But when it was over they said they'd have marked me higher if I'd ridden last. Sammy Andrews, who owned Bodacious, said he'd have marked me 98 or 99, and that it was the best ride he'd ever seen". There are those who consider it the greatest ride in history, "a near perfect exhibition of balance and anticipation." The ride helped Hedeman win the 1993 BRO world championship title.

=== 1994: Top Bull at the NFR ===
Bodacious bucked on the PRCA, BRO and PBR circuits in this season. In 1994, Terry Don West attempted Bodacious a third time, and it nearly killed him. It was at a PRCA event at the Houston Livestock Show and Rodeo in Houston, Texas. He opted out of wearing any protection during the ride. Bodacious battered West with his head and shoulders as West was falling off him. West received broken ribs, a broken wrist, and a punctured lung. West's wife, Michelle, revealed that West didn't want to get on Bodacious that night, and she had made light of his fears. "Then when he was lying out there, gasping for air, about to pass on, I said to myself 'That's real smart, Michelle.' I decided never to put my two cents in from then on." Bodacious received national attention for this incident.

At Houston, PRCA World Champion bull rider Cody Custer also attempted Bodacious for the first time. Custer acknowledged he was nervous and said this was "probably the biggest challenge in my life". Bodacious burst out of the chute, and then he jumped to the side once. Then he charged forward, which sent his rear legs over Custer's head. "For a moment, it looked as if Custer could withstand the force", but then he was thrown, a horn nicking his cheek. Custer only made two seconds on the bull. "I don't know," Custer said later, stunned, "He does something to get your feet behind you."

At an elite Bud Light Cup (BLC) event, Bullnanza in Guthrie, Oklahoma, the bull bucked off Jim Sharp in the championship round. A few events later, Bodacious (identified on TV under the name Intrepid) bucked off California bull rider Sean McRoberts in under three seconds at the Boyz & the Bullz event in Rancho Murieta, California. Later on at Bullnanza-Nashville in Nashville, Tennessee, Scott Breding bucked off Bodacious just short of the eight-second whistle, costing him the event win. Then later that year at a second PBR event in Guthrie, Oklahoma, 1994 PRCA World Champion bull rider Daryl Mills bucked off Bodacious. Finally, at the inaugural PBR World Finals in Las Vegas, Nevada, in the championship round, Clint Branger (who had successfully ridden the bull one year prior) bucked off Bodacious just shy of the requisite eight seconds. This buck-off ultimately cost Branger the 1994 PBR World Champion title. Also, at the 1994 Bull Riders Only World Finals in Denver, Colorado, Bodacious bucked off Brent Thurman during the championship round, just shy of reaching the eight-second mark.

=== 1995: PBR World Champion Bull ===
Bodacious bucked on the PRCA and PBR circuits in this season. In February 1995, according to the cowboys, Bodacious "learned a new trick, a sort of stutter hop on his front legs, followed by a faster, more powerful lift with his head". In Lufkin, Texas, at a PRCA event, Bubba Dunn took Bodacious on for a second time, and he scored 93 points. During this ride, Bodacious "creased the brim of Bubba's hat and bruised his cheek". Dunn felt lucky those were his only injuries that day. "Bo was psychotic. He didn't like people", said Cody Lambert. "If you were on his back, he wanted to hurt you." Dunn only attempted Bodacious two times, and he rode him both of those times. In fact, he said, "In 1995, (heck), I had to ride Bodacious to get invited to the PBR."

In February 1995, at the PBR's Bullnanza event in Guthrie, Oklahoma, Clint Branger rode Bodacious. The bull had bucked off Branger in 1994, but at the Bullnanza event held at the Lazy E Arena, Branger evened the score, riding the bull for 92 points. Bodacious was given a bull score of 46 points for the outing.

In 1995, at the San Antonio Stock Show and Rodeo in San Antonio, Texas, Terry Don West took on Bodacious for a fourth time at a PRCA event. Despite his injuries in the past, he made his second qualified ride on the bull, scoring 87 points and earning $10,365. This time he wore a protective vest. His qualified ride on Bodacious won him the round. The score between them now was 2-2. The qualified ride on Bodacious marked the first time the bull had been ridden in two years.

In May 1995, at the PBR's Jerome Davis Challenge event in Charlotte, North Carolina, multiple hall of fame cowboy Ty Murray drew Bodacious in the championship round and bucked off the bull in 1.70 seconds. Bodacious was given a bull score of 44 points, a relatively low score. In the first round of the same event earlier, a cowboy recorded only by his last name of Willard drew Bodacious. He bucked off the bull in 1.60 seconds. The judges decided this short buckoff qualified for an outstanding bull score of 48 points.

In June 1995, at the PBR's Bullnanza-Nashville in Nashville, Tennessee, Australian bull rider Rodney Lidgard drew Bodacious in the championship round and bucked off the bull in 1.30 seconds. Again, the judges decided that was enough time to give the bull an outstanding bull score of 48 points, which is very rare.

In September 1995, during the championship round of a PBR event, also in Guthrie, Oklahoma, Jerome Davis drew Bodacious. He was bucked off the bull in 6.60 seconds, who was given a bull score of 46 points.

In October 1995 at the PBR World Finals in Las Vegas, Nevada, at the MGM Grand Garden Arena, Tuff Hedeman drew Bodacious in the championship round. His confidence was high, his riding percentage was high, and he was the point leader by "an insurmountable three hundred points". Hedeman felt sure he would ride the bull this time. From 1993 to 1995, Bodacious had been out of competition for long periods due to an injury; however, he returned as a more dangerous animal, having developed a new bucking move "involving him bringing his rear up with his head to the ground, luring a rider to shift his weight forward, and then thrusting his head up full force, to smash the rider in the face".

An article in the New Yorker described the encounter:

This time, a split second after leaving the chute, the bull bucked forward with all his might. Hedeman did what riders are supposed to do: he leaned high over the bull's shoulders and flung his arm back as a counterbalance. But just as he came forward, Bodacious threw his head back—smashing it square into Hedeman's face. Hedeman stayed on somehow, his hand twisted in the rope, only to get head-butted again, thrown into the air, and bounced off the bull's back like a rag doll.

Hedeman lasted four seconds. Looking back at the ride, Hedeman feels he was "overconfident and underprepared". "When I nodded for him, the first jump felt fine," he said. "Then, all of a sudden, whack! When I hit the ground, I felt numb." What Hedeman could not see was how his face really looked; how much blood was on it. "When I was walking out of the arena I bit down and my teeth didn't come together, so I figured my jaw was broken," Hedeman recalled. "I didn't realize my whole face was smashed. But when I looked at people looking at me, they looked like they'd seen the devil." At the hospital, doctors diagnosed Hedeman and said every major bone in his face was broken. Hedeman went through two surgeries which installed six titanium plates and totaled 13 hours. On discharge, the swelling of his face was so extreme that his own young son could not recognize him.

In December 1995 at the NFR, Hedeman drew Bodacious for the last time in the seventh round, about two months after his previous bout with the bull. Hedeman "had lost twenty-five pounds and his body was still healing, but he'd managed to qualify for the National Finals Rodeo anyway". When it was Bodacious he drew, he climbed onto the bull's back in the chute to secure his eligibility to ride the following night, but he let the bull go out without him when the chute opened. He called Bodacious, "the baddest bull there has ever been".

Then, in the ninth round of the NFR two nights later, bull rider Scott Breding drew Bodacious. Breding had attempted Bodacious two times before. Scott Breding gave him his final professional ride. He tried wearing a hockey mask for the ride. It took less than four seconds for Bodacious to use the same move that he did on Hedeman to fracture Scott's left eye socket and cheekbone. He also broke his nose and knocked him unconscious. After treatment, Breding was released from University Medical Center and attended the remainder of the NFR but did not compete further.

In the 10th round the next day, December 11, 1995, the gate opened to reveal Sammy Andrews and then a yellow bull flashed out of a chute without a rider. Andrews announced that his famous bull was officially retired. The crowd was both shocked and relieved. Bodacious was seven years old at the time, still in his prime. "I didn't want to be the guy who let him kill someone," he said. "We're going to put him out on top," said Andrews. "I was hoping Scott would get by him. If the bull ever needed ridden it was last night. But these boys (bull riders) have made me." Andrews said Bodacious would be used for breeding.

=== 1996: Final rodeo ===
Though officially retired, Bodacious did buck at a few non-sanctioned events in 1996 before being permanently retired. One such out came at the now defunct Original Coors Showdown Rodeo in Phoenix, Arizona, against bull rider Bryan Barker, whom the bull proceeded to buck off in under three seconds, earning a bull score of 48. This was his last known outing at a rodeo.

=== 1997: Las Vegas showdown ===
The 1996 BRO World Championships were held April 3–5, 1997, at the Thomas and Mack Center in Las Vegas, Nevada. Despite some injuries, Terry Don West was intent on riding a bull named Woolly Bully on finals night. Not only did West manage to ride the bull for eight seconds, but he turned in a 91-point score. "This, tonight, is a dream come true," West said of that night's ride which won him the 1996 Bull Riders Only world championship title. Bull rider Shane Thurston came in second place with an 84 on the bull Nitro. Thurston and West made the only qualified rides in the championship round. West was reported as saying he would ride the infamous bull Bodacious in a sponsored match for the Bull Riders Only Championship in April 1997. The plan at that point was to bring the bull out of retirement to face West or another cowboy if West was not signed up by BRO officials in time for the week of October 3–5. The event was planned to take place in Las Vegas.

Retired in 1995, BRO planned a big event to bring him out of retirement in 1996 and have a special matchup with a bull rider. Although the bull was retired due to injuries he was causing riders, many want to see him buck again for another ride. It was planned to have him buck at the BRO World Championship in Las Vegas. The then rider in the works to match up with him was Terry Don West, who just won the PRCA bull riding champion title. "I don't think anyone craves getting on that bull," said West recently. "But if the money's right, that would be the reason I would want to get on him. We're in negotiations, and I'm sure there are other guys wanting a shot at him, too. But I think the fans out there would love to see me matched up with him." The president of BRO, Shaw Sullivan, assured everyone that Bodacious would not be put into a draw. "It'll be a match," Sullivan said. "With West matched against him, it would be the rankest bull in the world and the rankest bull rider." The event was planned to be held at the Thomas and Mack Arena. It was to be broadcast by the Fox Television Network to 100 million homes.

Bodacious was to be brought out of retirement one final time in the spring of 1997. On Saturday, April 5, 1997, Terry Don West planned to take on Bodacious for a fifth and final time in an attempt to break their 2–2 tie. Fox Television talked West into it, with the $10,000 purse being donated to Sunrise Children's Hospital. This event was to cap off the $1 million Wrangler Bull Riders Only (BRO) 1996 World Championships at the Thomas & Mack Center.

"I hope this is the last time they buck that bull. He will kill somebody," said West, who was the reigning PRCA World Bull Riding Champion at the time. West nervously climbed into Bodacious' pen for a photography session at Harrah's. The bull was accompanied by a familiar cow and two calves to keep him calm. "He'll tear the pen up," West said. "When I got in there, he gave me a look, saying 'Don't get no closer. You'll pay for it.'"

West, then 31 years old, was slated to wear a chest vest and a face mask. He also pre-purchased additional insurance. Bodacious may have been inactive for almost two years, but "Bo hasn't forgotten how to buck," said West. However, two nights before the match scheduled with Bodacious, West had a match with a bull named Bananarama. Bananarama fell back against the chute while West was getting ready, pinning West and resulting in two black eyes, a broken ankle, and a concussion. West was not able to compete the following night nor to take on Bodacious by Saturday night at their scheduled time. Thus, West's fifth ride with Bodacious never took place. This meant that Bo's retirement stayed in effect, and at that time, it was well along the second year. Fox nevertheless donated the money to the children's hospital.

=== Legacy ===
Bodacious became infamously known as "the world's most dangerous bull" throughout the sport of bull riding and beyond due to his reputation for injuring riders. Tuff Hedeman is the bull rider known to have received the worst injuries from Bodacious, with Scott Breding and Terry Don West being runners-up. Hedeman and Breding were injured towards the end of Bodacious' career in 1995. But at the same time, he became known as "the greatest bull ever to buck." "Of all the bulls I've ever seen, he's the most dangerous," Hedeman once told a Sports Illustrated reporter. Throughout Bodacious' career, hall of fame rodeo announcer Bob Tallman referred to him as "the yellow whale" due to his color and size.

Hedeman once said "even top-ranked guys who weren't afraid of anything were definitely afraid of Bodacious." A ride of the giant that didn't end with injury was a successful ride. Bodacious was such a powerhouse it wasn't uncommon to see his belly from the top of the back of the chute – and if you can imagine being tied to something nearly a ton dropping even five feet then changing directions – and you don't know what direction – you can imagine a very small glimpse of him. He was able to buck many off before they could nod their heads

The key to this was that Bodacious was such a skilled jumper he could jump higher than the top bar of the chute, resulting in many riders being bucked off on the first jump. "Bo's first jump when he left the chute resembled a roller coaster ride," said Sammy Andrews' wife Caroline. "Bodacious could kick and roll and he learned how to unseat a rider. Bodacious really liked to get in the air. And every time he jumped, he usually brought a bull rider forward," putting riders in position to injure them with his head.

On January 23, 2013, the PBR published an article about the greatest bulls where they took a survey of bull riding fans and the two most mentioned bulls were Bodacious and Little Yellow Jacket. On June 29, 2015, the PBR published an article about the memorable bulls of the PBR and listed Bodacious "as one of the most famous bulls of all time." He and Bushwacker are similar in terms of popularity.

The ProRodeo Hall of Fame chose Bodacious in 1999 as their sixth member; there are only seven bulls inducted as of 2017. Bo joins such exceptional bulls as Pacific Bell, Red Rock, Oscar, and Jim Shoulders' Tornado. Mostly, those bulls had long careers. However, Bo's short professional career lasted only four years. In that time, he bucked off 127 of 135 riders. Bryan McDonald, the PRCA bull riding director who sets the pens for the NFR, commented that Bo was ranker than any of those bulls. "Pacific Bell could hook the crap out of you. Mr. T and Red Rock, they were both smart and wouldn't hurt anyone. Bodacious, he was murderous." In 2017, the Bull Riding Hall of Fame inducted Bodacious, joining Tornado in another hall of fame and the bull known only by his brand, V-61. In 1994 and 1995, the top cowboys voted him as the PRCA Bucking Bull of the Year. In 1992, '94, and '95, he was elected Bucking Bull of the NFR.

Many made tributes to Bodacious over the years. Some examples include alternative rock band Primus, who dedicated a song to Bodacious on their 1999 album, Antipop. It is called "Ballad of Bodacious." Products named after Bodacious include a big mountain ski produced by Austrian ski company Blizzard Ski, Short's Brewing Company's double-Black IPA "Goodnight Bodacious," and the Spyderco Bodacious folding knife.

== Post-bucking career ==
=== Breeding ===
Bodacious spent his retirement on the Andrews Rodeo Company Ranch. He could be found relaxing in the pasture or mating under natural cover. He mated with a total of 120 cows in his retirement. Otherwise, he might be on a tour. Initially, Sammy Andrews stored his semen. However, when the breeding organization, Buckers, Inc., was formed, Bodacious was its first client. The organization's goal were "keeping the legacy of Bodacious alive" and improving bull breeding. Buckers also became the manager of Bo's marketing.

H. D. Page rode, bred, and hauled Bodacious' progeny. This gave him a bit of unique insight into the bull. He was initially unimpressed, but then he saw some very good progeny, especially from his daughters. Page also understands what it takes to promote a sire, and points out that Bob Tallman promoted Bodacious better than anyone. Some of Page's bulls which he has bred from Bo's daughters have been BFTS bulls, for example, 77 Hustler.

Tallman trademarked Bodacious's name, and he said he did it because he believed in the bull. He said, "We registered his likeness and created an icon." That icon still exists today. He believes that the quality of bulls like Bodacious changed bull riding. When Bodacious retired, stock contractors and Tallman started pondering the question of how to continue raising that quality of bulls.

In 1992, Tallman and Andrews were venting about dishonest bull breeders "who advertised bulls by famous sires like Oscar or Red Rock, when in actuality the bulls came from some obscure sale barn". Naturally buyers were refusing to pay top dollar for bulls whose sires and lineage could not be verified. Andrews believed a verifiable bloodline was necessary in order to garner the trust of buyers. Tallman had studied genetics and had incorporated it into his own breeding program. So in 1996, he and a partner started Buckers, Inc. It used DNA testing to verify a bull's parentage. Bodacious became the test case for this model: "every stock contractor in the business wanted a bull as rank as Bodacious—especially if they were certain the calf was a legitimate son". Buckers registered and certified records of Bodacious' progeny resulting from semen collection. They also started collecting other top bulls' semen too. By 2003, Buckers had 11,000 cattle registered. Randy Bernard, the CEO of the PBR, was so impressed that he bought out Buckers and renamed the company to American Bucking Bull. He sold 19 shares of the ABBI for $25,000 apiece. The first bucking bull registered on the ABBI is Bodacious as he is the first bull in the Buckers, Inc., database. His ABBI registration number is 1000078. When Bodacious died in 2000, he had 23 sons who had professional outs. This earned him the top spot on the all-time producing sire's list at that time.

Bodacious sired many progeny that competed in the PRCA and PBR. These included bulls such as Bo's Excuse, Erks Me, and Fender Bender. On June 6, 2008, four of his sons performed throughout the weekend at the Rodeo Killeen, in Killeen, Texas, in its 61st year at the time. Those sons included Red Onion, Pull the Trigger, and Fender Bender. Each of those bulls lived at Andrews' ranch at the time. Bodacious also sired Bo Howdy, who debuted in 2002 as a PBR bull.

One of Bodacious' most successful sons was a bull that Sammy Andrews bred. His name was Midnight Bender, and Andrews bucked him on the PRCA circuit in the mid-to-late 2010s. The bull won the PRCA Bucking Bull of the Year title in 2016. "Midnight Bender does not have a reputation of injuring and alienating cowboys. But like Bodacious, Midnight Bender bucks with an attitude and some altitude". According to Andrews, the bull spent a lot of time in the air and kicked hard. The bull gave quite a show when he bucked, and the riders all liked him. At times the bull was reminiscent of Bodacious in some of his movements, even the difficult ones. But Andrews claimed this bull was rideable.

Another successful son of Bodacious was Beaver Creek Beau, owned by Chad Berger Bucking Bulls and partners, who bucked from 2013 to 2020 in the PBR and CBR circuits. He ranked in the top 20 on the Built Ford Tough Series (BFTS) in 2016 and was very close to being a world champion bull contender. Beau was a sizable bull, like his sire, weighing in around 1,900 pounds (860 kg). He was not quite as fast as his sire, but was fast enough to be a Championship round bull.

In 2002, the PRCA awarded the Andrews Rodeo Company the Stock Contractor of the Year award. His ability to produce quality stock is earmarked by his hall of fame bull, Bodacious, and his history of producing great bucking stock, both bulls and broncs. In 2008, the Texas Rodeo Cowboy Hall of Fame inducted Sammy Andrews.

=== Public appearances ===
During Bodacious' retirement life, his owner obtained a New York agent to manage public appearances. He was taken on tour to state fairs, rodeos, and casinos around the United States. He appeared as a celebrity guest at Harrah's Las Vegas and the Silverton Hotel and Casino in Las Vegas. Articles about him appeared in Sports Illustrated, GQ, and Penthouse. He appeared in advertising for Bud Light. He also was featured on merchandise, including items such as belt buckles and watches from Montana Silversmiths, a limited commemorative edition Winchester Rifle by A&A Entraving, and T-shirts. Prior to his death, "Wrangler had just issued a new Bodacious T-shirt and "Bo" was featured, along with Tuff Hedeman, in advertising for Bud Light". The most recent merchandise is the Bodacious figurine toy. Created in 2017, Bodacious the bull comes with a bull rider, bull rope, and stand. It was approved by Andrews Rodeo Company on March 5, 2017.

His television appearances included a profile on the Fox TV program "Guinness World Records Prime Time." He was profiled on BRO telecasts on the Cowboy Lifestyle Network. After his death, the NBCSN (formerly Outdoor Life Network) program "Fearless" visited the Andrews Rodeo Company Ranch in 2004 and filmed a documentary titled, "Fearless Bodacious."

=== Death ===
Bodacious developed a hoof infection when he was 12 years old. The medication used to cure the infection damaged his kidneys, and as a result, he died of kidney failure at his holding pen at the Andrews Rodeo Company Ranch on May 16, 2000. In 2004, The Houston Livestock Show and Rodeo had a miniature bucking chute manufactured and gave it to Sammy Andrews for Bodacious' grave.

== Honors ==
- 2× PRCA Bucking Bull of the Year (1994, 1995)
- 2× PRCA Texas Circuit Bull of the Year (1993, 1994)
- 3× PRCA Bucking Bull of the NFR (1992, 1994, 1995)
- 1995 PBR World Champion Bull
- 1999 ProRodeo Hall of Fame inductee
- 2017 Bull Riding Hall of Fame inductee
- 2019 PBR Brand of Honor inductee
- 2020 Texas Rodeo Cowboy Hall of Fame inductee
- No. 30 on the Top 30 Bulls in PBR History (2023)
- 2026 RodeoHouston Hall of Fame inductee

== Bibliography ==
- ProRodeo Awards (PDF). Professional Rodeo Cowboys Association. 2018. p. 563.
- Stock Contractors (PDF). Professional Rodeo Cowboys Association. 2018. p. 640.
- NFR Records, History (PDF). Professional Rodeo Cowboys Association. 2018. pp. 347–348.
- "West Takes BRO Championships". No. Jul-Aug 1997. American Cowboy. Active Interest Media, Inc. August 1997. p. 11.
- "No Go On Bo". No. Jul-Aug 1997. American Cowboy. Active Interest Media, Inc. August 1997. p. 11.

== Sources ==
- Peter, Josh (2005). Fried twinkies, buckle bunnies, & bull riders : a year inside the professional bull riders tour. Colorado Springs, Colorado: Rodale, Inc. pp. 138–139. ISBN 978-1-59486-119-2. "fried twinkies buckle bunnies."
- Nance, Susan (2013). "Sport, Animals, and Society". A Star is Born to Buck: Animal Celebrity and the Marketing of Professional Rodeo. Routledge. p. 178. ISBN 9781135019150.
- Groves, Melody (2006). Ropes, Reins, and Rawhide: All about Rodeo. UNM Press. p. 58. ISBN 9780826338228.
- Fensch, Thomas (2013). The Sports Writing Handbook. Routledge. ISBN 9781136689864.
