= Red Wolf (bull) =

American bucking bull (1988-2006)

- Sex: Bull
- Born: 1988
- Died: December 29, 2006 (aged 18); Mont Belvieu, Texas, U.S.
- Nationality: United States
- Years active: 1992–2000
- Owner: Herrington Cattle Company
- Weight: 2,000 lb (910 kg)
- Appearance: Red with a Mottled White Face
- Awards: 1996 PRCA Bucking Bull of the Year

Red Wolf #112 (1988 – December 29, 2006) was an American bucking bull. He competed in the Professional Rodeo Cowboys Association (PRCA) and Professional Bull Riders (PBR) circuits. He won the PRCA Bucking Bull of the Year title in 1996 as well as other honors throughout his career. He bucked until 2000 when he was 12 years old, considered an old age for a bull to buck, and he did it at a very high level. He bucked more than 100 times at all levels, which very few bulls manage. In 2013, he was inducted into the PBR Brand of Honor. He was also known for the accidental death of bull rider Brent Thurman.

In 2023, Red Wolf was ranked No. 9 on the list of the top 30 bulls in PBR history.

== Background ==
Red Wolf was born in 1988. He was red with a mottled white face and both his horns were large and pointed downwards. Red Wolf's first owner was Don Kish of Kish's Buckin' Best. Red Wolf went to the 1994 National Finals Rodeo (NFR) while still with Don Kish. He competed multiple times at the NFR and was a contender for the PRCA Bucking Bull of the Year in 1994 and won it in 1996, receiving that honor as well as Sierra Circuit Bucking Bull of the Year in 1996.

Terry Williams bought Red Wolf from Kish at the conclusion of the 1996 NFR. The bull became sponsored by Dodge Ram trucks the year he was awarded the PRCA Bull of the Year, thus he was renamed as Dodge RAM Tough. However, his name was restored to Red Wolf shortly thereafter. In 1999, Terry Williams sold Red Wolf and three other noteworthy bulls (Hollywood, Moody Blues, and Locomotive Breath) to the Herrington Cattle Company for $200,000.

== Career ==
Red Wolf maintained his powerful, intense performance ability far longer than other bulls, from 1995 through his retirement in 2000. During his second year in the PBR in 1995, Red Wolf made quite an impression in Rancho Murieta, California, when he bucked off Cody Lambert in 4.09 seconds. "He was a big bull," Lambert remembers, "but he felt even bigger when he was bucking." The next day, Red Wolf quickly dropped Bubba Dunn on the ground with the need for five stitches on his chin. Red Wolf was seven years old at the time.

Red Wolf was as well known for his competitiveness. He was described as having the swagger of a champion boxer in the arena. Ty Murray recalls that the bull would often take a "high-headed" lap around the arena, which Lambert described as a "victory lap". When someone rode him or almost rode him to the buzzer, he was dangerous; he would try to hook or trample the rider at the end of the performance, and if unable to do so, would go after any other rodeo official in the ring. Lambert commented that the bull had a "competitive fire" and appeared to become angrier the longer someone stayed on. "He would want to hook your ass when it was over, " Murray said. Once in 1995 when Lambert attempted to ride Red Wolf, he felt that anger rising. Lambert purposely fell to the ground after getting bucked off to avoid being injured. The bull could also be dangerous to bystanders; Lambert described an incident in 1997: "while one of the judges was calculating the score Red Wolf ran him over. We had to bring in an alternate judge to finish the round."

Bubba Dunn rode Red Wolf in Charlotte, North Carolina, in 1999. Remembering that he had gotten five stitches on an earlier ride and that Red Wolf had accidentally killed Brent Thurman at the 1994 NFR, he was nervous. Nevertheless, Dunn rode Red Wolf for 96 points on his second encounter with the bull. At this point, Red Wolf was 11 years old. Dunn said, "He had great days and he had good days. He never had bad days."

At the 2000 PBR World Finals, Red Wolf gave up two qualified rides for his final two rides in his career. In Round 2, Jaron Nunnemaker rode him for 89.5 points, with a 44-point bull score. In Round 4, Pete Hessman rode him for 90 points, and Red Wolf received a bull score of 45 points in his final appearance. These would be considered outstanding bull scores for a young bull, let alone a bull his age. His final buckoff had come two months earlier when he bucked off World Champion Cody Custer in Oklahoma City, Oklahoma. Long time bull riding champion Ty Murray commented on the length of his career and said, "He wasn't supposed to be able to do it for as long as he did. I always thought he was a freak of nature." Red Wolf was known as an "eliminator bull," challenging because of the lack of set pattern to his jumps.

=== Brent Thurman's death ===
Sunday, December 11, 1994, was the first time a bull riding incident resulted in the death of a bull rider at the NFR when Brent Thurman was stomped on and killed by Red Wolf. At the time, Red Wolf weighed 1,800 pounds (820 kg), a very large bull. Halfway into the ride, Thurman was bucked off and became entangled in his bull rope, which pulled him underneath Red Wolf's hooves where he was stomped about his neck and head. Thurman, unconscious, was dispatched to University Medical Center with severe cranial and facial fractures. He died six days later, having never regained consciousness. Red Wolf was not considered vicious for a bull, and the death was ruled a "freak accident." This happened when Red Wolf was still owned by Kish's Buckin' Best from Red Bluff, California.

Bull riders Lane Frost (who died in 1989) and Brent Thurman both died at age 25 from injuries received from bulls. Thus, the PBR created the Lane Frost/Brent Thurman Award in their honor; awarded to the bull rider who scores the single-highest scored ride at the PBR World Finals since 1996. Both men were recognized with the Ring of Honor, which is the PBR's equivalent of a hall of fame honor.

=== PBR 20/20 ===
In 2013, RFD-TV listed the 1999 World Finals among its Top 20 events and featured it as an episode of their "PBR 20/20" series. The 1999 World Finals were the first time the finals were held at the Thomas & Mack Center in Las Vegas, Nevada. On Friday night, there were 11 scores of 90+ points. Throughout the entire event, there were 15 scores of 91 points or better. And eight of those scores (more than half of them) occurred Friday night in Round 2. And of those eight scores, five of those were 94 points or higher.

Future two-time PBR World Champion Chris Shivers rode Trick or Treat for 96 points. PRCA World Champion bull rider Terry Don West rode PBR World Champion Bull Promise Land for 96 points as well. Nine-time PRCA World Champion (seven all-around and two bull riding) Ty Murray rode Red Wolf for 95.5 points. Jaron Nunnemaker rode PBR World Champion Bull Panhandle Slim for 94 points. Two-time PRCA World Champion bull rider Jim Sharp rode Jim Jam for 94 points as well. Future two-time PBR World Champion Justin McBride got a qualified ride on Nitro for 91 points which meant he missed the top five. Future PRCA World Champion bull rider Mike White also got a qualified ride for 91 points on Skat Kat Skoal. The pair split seventh and eighth in the round and were nowhere near earning a check.

=== Career summary ===
Red Wolf bucked in the PRCA and the Bud Light Cup Series (BLC), the elite circuit of the PBR. He had an extremely long career compared to other high level bucking bulls. He qualified for six consecutive PBR World Finals. His BLC career buckoff percentage was 58.97. In 39 outs, he gave up 16 qualified rides, including seven round wins. His average bull score at the end was 45.54 points. As of the end of 2013, Red Wolf was among the top 20 bulls in PBR history for average bull score and average ride score. Since 90 point rides are also tracked in the "90-point club," Red Wolf was in tenth place for the number of 90+ rides produced at the time. His last out was made at the 2000 PBR World Finals.

In 1996, Red Wolf was voted the Bucking Bull of the Year at the NFR, the highest honor of the PRCA for an active bull. Unlike many other Brand of Honor bulls, he never achieved the PBR World Champion Bull title. In April 2016, Cody Lambert compared Red Wolf to then-active PBR bull Stanley Fatmax. "He really doesn’t have the talent to win it. He has as much heart as any bull that’s ever bucked. He’s been around a long time, and he’s going to end up like Red Wolf, who was so great for so long, but never quite great enough to be the PBR World Champ." Fatmax has more than 100 outs at all levels and has been a bull who has bucked at a high level for a long time.

== Retirement and death ==
Lambert was one of the judges at the 2000 Finals. According to him, "I never thought in any particular year he was the very best going, but for an entire career, I thought he was the best there ever was."

Slade Long, PBR bull statistician, and owner of Probullstats.com, has observed over 30,000 bulls as of 2013. Long remarked that approximately 12,000 of them posted more than five or more career outs. Even more infrequent was a bull who reached 100 career outs. Long also added that he is aware of only 65 bulls to reach 100 career outs, Red Wolf stood out to Long: "Bulls that are 12 years old just don't make 90-point rides. They are just not that good anymore. It just doesn't happen."

Red Wolf retired at age 12 in 2000, which is considered quite old for a bull. In 2013, the PBR awarded Red Wolf with the highest honor a bull can receive, the Heroes and Legends Celebration: Brand of Honor. This award was inaugurally awarded to Little Yellow Jacket in 2011. This award is awarded every year to an exceptional bull and is the equivalent of a hall of fame honor. The ceremony was held on October 22, 2013, at the South Point Hotel, Casino & Spa. Red Wolf's last owner, stock contractor Robbie Herrington of Herrington Cattle Company, was unable to attend the event due to the death of a close family friend. Instead, retired bull rider J.W. Hart and Cody Lambert spoke on his behalf. Red Wolf was 13 when he retired. Lambert noted that the average age of bulls competing at the Finals in 2013 was 6. And, by comparison, two bulls retiring that year were 9 years old.

Red Wolf died at age 18 on December 29, 2006, at the Herrington Ranch in Mont Belvieu, Texas. Robby Herrington, the bull's owner, said that Red Wolf was treated "like a king" and was well-respected by both fans and competitors. "Red Wolf was like the Jerry Rice of bucking bulls," said Ty Murray, PBR President.

Randy Bernard, then-CEO of the PBR, commented on his athleticism and personality, describing his behavior at a ceremony held in his honor:

[W]e honored him by bringing him out into the arena under a dark house ...When he made his entrance under the spot lights he came out and bowed his head like he knew it was his last time. It was one of the longest standing ovations I can remember at any performance. He was a great athlete that tried every single time."

== Honors ==
- Years selected to the NFR: 1993–1996
- 1994 2nd Place Bucking Bull of the NFR
- 1996 Dodge Bounty Bull of the Year
- 1996 PRCA Sierra Circuit Bucking Bull of the Year
- 1996 2nd Place Bucking Bull of the NFR
- 1996 PRCA Bucking Bull of the Year
- Years selected to the PBR World Finals: 1995–2000
- 1997 Second Place PBR Bull of the Year
- 1997 Second Place PBR Bull of the Finals
- 1998 Third Place PBR Bull of the Year
- 1999 High Ride: 96 points by Bubba Dunn in Charlotte, North Carolina
- 2000 5th Place PBR Bull of the Year
- 2013 PBR Brand of Honor
- ProBullStats Hall of Fame
- 2023 ranked No. 9 on the list of the top 30 bulls in PBR history
