= Aaron Semas =

American bull rider (born 1966)

Aaron Stanford Semas (born September 1, 1966) is an American former professional rodeo cowboy who specialized in bull riding. He competed in the Professional Rodeo Cowboys Association (PRCA), Bull Riders Only (BRO), and Professional Bull Riders (PBR) circuits. He was one of the founders of the PBR.

== Early life ==
Semas was born in Auburn, California, and was raised on a ranch by his parents, Stanley and Sandra. He is one of six children.

He developed an interest in rodeo at an early age and, while attending Placer High School, competed in team roping, calf roping, and bull riding as part of a District 3 high school rodeo team. In 1985, the year he graduated, he won the California state high-school championship in bull riding.

Following high school, Semas competed in regional rodeos throughout Northern California. In 1987, he obtained his PRCA permit.

== Career ==
Semas began competing in the PRCA in 1988. He qualified for the National Finals Rodeo (NFR) seven times (1990, 1992 through 1996 and 1998).

During his PRCA career, Semas won major rodeos including Denver, San Antonio, Houston.

He also qualified for the first eight PBR World Finals from 1994 through 2001, although he did not compete at the 1994 World Finals due to injury.

He competed alongside prominent bull riders of the era, including Jim Sharp, Ty Murray, Clint Branger, Scott Breding, Tuff Hedeman, and Marty Staneart.

Semas also faced notable bulls such as Bodacious, Yellow Jacket, and Promiseland.

He retired from professional competition in 2003. Following his retirement, he continued to serve on the PBR Board of Directors for more than a decade.

== Legacy ==
Semas is regarded within the bull-riding community as a technically skilled rider and a contributor to the growth of professional bull riding as a standalone sport.

In addition to his competitive career, his involvement in the founding and governance of the PBR contributed to the development of the modern professional bull riding circuit.

Since retiring, he has volunteered for research and spoken publicly about the long-term effects of head injuries sustained during his career.

== Honors ==
- In 2003, Semas was inducted into the PBR Ring of Honor.
- In 2020, he was inducted into the Placer High School Athletic Hall of Fame.
- In 2025, he was inducted into the Bull Riding Hall of Fame.
