= Bull Riders Only =

American bull riding organization

- Sport: Bull riding
- Founded: 1991
- Countries: United States
- Most recent champion: (United States) Terry Don West
- Website: N/A

Bull Riders Only, Inc. (BRO) was a professional bull riding organization based in Englewood, Colorado, United States.

== History ==
Inspired by years of successful unsanctioned stand-alone bull riding events, businessman and former bull rider, Shaw P. Sullivan and investment banker Eric Dickson created the first organization dedicated exclusively to bull riding in the United States, Bull Riders Only, Inc. (BRO). They founded the organization in 1991, with the first season happening that year. BRO did not charge its riders entrance fees, unlike the Professional Rodeo Cowboys Association (PRCA).

The organization held its first event in June 1991; despite grossing only $40,000, the other four events that year were successful enough that they held 11 events in the second season, with total prizes of $20,000. The organization instituted what is now known as the sudden-death format in bull riding, where the contestants compete in rounds until a winner is established. BRO's first such event had 30 contestants; the top 18 proceeded to the next round, and then the top 10 competed for the cash prizes.

BRO attracted many top PRCA bull riders of the 1990s such as Charlie Sampson, Cody Snyder, Ted Nuce, Cody Lambert, Tuff Hedeman, Cody Custer, Jim Sharp, Ty Murray, Aaron Semas, Scott Mendes, Brent Thurman, Glen Keeley, Jerome Davis, and Adriano Morães. Every year, BRO would expand the number of events it had, with the season concluding with a World Finals event. All BRO events were televised on the Prime Network. However, by late 1996, the channel was renamed as Fox Sports Net.

The inaugural BRO World Finals for the 1991 season took place in Long Beach, California. The 1992 BRO World Finals took place in Denver, Colorado. The 1993 World Finals took place once again in Long Beach, California. The 1994 and 1995 World Finals events took place again in Denver, Colorado. The 1996-1997 World Finals took place in Las Vegas, Nevada, and it was the first rodeo/bull riding event to be televised live and in prime time on a major network, with it being on Fox. It would go on to become the most watched rodeo/bull riding event telecast in history, with 4.2 million viewers.

In 1992, after the Justin Boots World Bull Riding Championship in Scottsdale, Arizona, about a dozen of the best bull riders in the PRCA planned to create their own bull riding tour, in much the same way as the BRO organization had done a few years earlier. Many bull riders who competed in BRO were unhappy with the terms of their contracts, such as Sullvan's insistence on choosing which sponsorship logos riders could wear, how prize money would be disbursed, and which bulls each rider would get on; they felt they should have had control of these matters, instead. Tuff Hedeman recalled, "We basically said, 'Screw you.'" The number of original investors grew to 21 and included PRCA and BRO bull riders. They formed the Professional Bull Riders (PBR) as its own separate tour as a way for them to decide how the bull riding competition was run.

Michael Gaffney, one of the founders of the PBR, described how tough it was to make ends meet when he was bull riding in the PRCA. He said that when BRO came along, it paid more, but he described Sullivan as a dictator. At one meeting in Denver, many veteran riders walked out after Sullivan tried to get some of the most notable riders to sign exclusivity rights. Riders such as Hedeman, Lambert, and Custer were in this group, which Sullivan needed to attract enough fans. For younger riders like himself, Gaffney related that Sullivan used "ploy and scare tactics" to sign that contract. Sullivan had tried to get Hedeman and Lambert into events, but left out Custer out because, according to Gaffney, "he didn't like him." Eventually, all of the riders gave Sullivan an ultimatum: include Custer or none of them would compete.

In 1993, Acme Boots became the title sponsor of the BRO tour, thus becoming the Acme Bull Riders Only Series.

In 1994, Wrangler Jeans became the new title sponsor of the BRO tour, thus renaming it the Wrangler Bull Riders Only Series.

In the 1997-1998 season, BRO introduced a series of lower-level events, the Super Bull Tour and Bull Stomping Tour, which allowed riders to work their way up to the televised newly-named Wrangler Pro Tour. The World Finals event for said season was scheduled to take place in Las Vegas again. However, BRO was struggling financially as a result of the previous season's World Finals being the most expensive event the organization had ever produced and because the bull riding market in the United States at the time could not support two professional tours. BRO ended up going out of business in the spring of 1998. Following its collapse, some annual BRO events became sanctioned by the PBR.

David Fournier, from Raceland, Louisiana, is one of the founders of the PBR, a seven-time NFR qualifier and four-time qualifier for the PBR World Finals. He lays the blame for the failure of BRO squarely on the shoulders of its founder, Shaw Sullivan. According to Fournier, Sullivan was resolute that riders attempt three bulls a night, but after two, they "didn't have anything left", yet they were paired with Bodacious-like eliminator matchups. He said, "Had BRO taken care of the business end of it and let the bull riders control the bull riding part of it, I think it would be what the PBR is today."

== Organization ==
The BRO headquarters were established in Englewood, Colorado. After BRO started up, most of the bull riders continued to compete in both BRO and the PRCA. Once the PBR had also been founded in 1992, its headquarters were in nearby Colorado Springs, Colorado. The PBR had its first competitive season in 1994, in which they held eight regular-season events plus a finals event, and disbursed $250,000 in prize money. Like the PRCA, the PBR hosted its finals in Las Vegas, Nevada. However, unlike the PRCA's National Finals Rodeo, which was held at the Thomas and Mack Center, the PBR's finals event was held in the MGM Grand Garden Arena. The PBR had quite successful sponsorship, allowing it to compete with BRO. In 1995, the PBR expanded to 12 major league events, plus a series of several minor league events. They hired Randy Bernard to serve as CEO. By 1997, both BRO and the PBR were holding approximately two dozen televised events each. However, the PBR paid out more money for all of its regular season events than BRO did for its one and two-day events. By the tail end of its 1997-98 regular season, BRO went out of business. This business with these two organizations and their tours also had an effect on the PRCA; the bull riding in that organization was greatly diminished. Bull riders in the PRCA reduced their riding to just enough to try to make the lucrative National Finals Rodeo. On the other hand, the PBR tour, requiring its top riders to compete in all of its major league events, was considered a better choice financially and physically.

In August 1993, the Bull Riders Only tour stopped at the Delta Center in Salt Lake City, Utah. To date that year, Hedeman was first in the world standings, with $20,275 earned. Jim Sharp was in second place with $14,000 in earnings. In 1993, BRO paid out a total $286,000 in prize money. The championship finished on November 20 in Long Beach, California, paying out $50,000. Bull rider Richard Rule spent over 15 years traveling the country to ride bulls in the PRCA and BRO. He ranked in the top 25 riders persistently and was highly regarded by his fellow competitors. His top accomplishment was capturing the Mountain States Circuit Bull Riding Championship in 1985.

In October 1993, at the Rosemont Horizon in Rosemont, Illinois, 30 bull riders from BRO, including Dan Wolfe, came to demonstrate their skills at the Acme Bull Riders Only Main Event. This was the only event in the history of BRO to not be televised on Prime/Fox. Instead, it was televised on ESPN. "It's like a 100 percent adrenaline rush," said Wolfe, 22. "The bull acts, and you react. It's kind of like a dance." A lot of preparation took place for the Rosemont Horizon to handle a bull riding event. Dirt, equipment, and bulls came from distances all around. However, one of the event's backers, Stedman Graham, was not pleased with the turnout, but he did recognize that market needed to be developed. The year 1993 was the third time that Sullivan held the Acme Bull Riders Only Main Event, but it was the first for Chicago. For the Bull Riders Only tour that year, the Rosemont Horizon was the 12th event of a 13 city tour. The championship round was held in Long Beach in November and by that time $250,000 in prize money would have been disbursed.

One of the biggest participants and contributors to both the PRCA and BRO was bull riding champion and hall-of-famer Tuff Hedeman. He holds three world championships in the PRCA, one in 1993 in BRO, and one in 1995 in the PBR. He was inducted into the ProRodeo Hall of Fame and the Bull Riding Hall of Fame, among many others. Hall-of-Famer and 8-time PRCA world champion bull rider Don Gay said that, "Without Tuff, there would be no stand-alone bull riding events other than Bull Riders Only (BRO). Without Tuff, the PBR would never have happened."

=== Terry Don West ===
Terry Don West is best known for riding the infamous bull Bodacious. He also has five world champion bull rider titles between the PRCA, IPRA and BRO. West had attempted Bodacious four times and gotten a qualified ride twice.

The 1996 BRO World Championships were held April 3–5, 1997 at the Thomas and Mack Center in Las Vegas, Nevada. Despite some injuries, Terry Don West was intent on riding a bull named Woolly Bully on finals night. Not only did West manage to ride the bull for 8 seconds, but he turned in a 91 point score. "This, tonight, is a dream come true," West said of that night's ride which won him the 1996 Bull Riders Only world championship title. Bull rider Shane Thurston came in second place with an 84 on the bull Nitro. Thurston and West made the only qualified rides in the championship round. West was reported as saying he would ride the infamous bull Bodacious in a sponsored match for the Bull Riders Only Championship in April 1997. The plan at that point was to bring the bull out of retirement to face West or another cowboy if West was not signed up by BRO officials in time for the week of October 3–5. The event was planned to take place in Las Vegas.

Retired in 1995, BRO planned a big event to bring him out of retirement in 1996 and have a special matchup with a bull rider. Although the bull was retired due to injuries he was causing riders, many wanted to see him buck again for another ride. It was planned to have him buck at the BRO World Championship in Las Vegas. The then rider in the works to match up with him was Terry Don West, who just won the PRCA bull riding champion title. "I don't think anyone craves getting on that bull," said West recently. "But if the money's right, that would be the reason I would want to get on him. We're in negotiations, and I'm sure there are other guys wanting a shot at him, too. But I think the fans out there would love to see me matched up with him." The president of BRO, Shaw Sullivan, assured everyone that Bodacious would not be put into a draw. "It'll be a match," Sullivan said. "With West matched against him, it would be the rankest bull in the world and the rankest bull rider." The event was planned to be held at the Thomas and Mack Arena. It was to be broadcast by the Fox Television Network to 100 million homes.

=== Tuff Hedeman's best ride on Bodacious ===
In 1993, Tuff Hedeman participated in the 1993 BRO World Finals, in Long Beach, California. He remained resolute in his determination to get a qualified ride on Bodacious. "He was like a monster once he matured. Even the good guys were super scared of him. You’d see world champions ride him for a jump or two and then get off." This time, Hedeman scored 95 points on Bodacious in his third attempt on him. Hedeman felt this ride was the best in his career. He explained "the judges told me they wished I hadn't been the first guy out. They were saving some room, on the chance that there would possibly be a better ride. But when it was over they said they'd have marked me higher if I'd ridden last. Sammy Andrews, who owned Bodacious, said he'd have marked me 98 or 99, and that it was the best ride he'd ever seen". There are those who consider it the greatest ride in history, "a near perfect exhibition of balance and anticipation." The ride was good enough for Hedeman to win enough money to win the BRO world championship that year.

=== End of Bodacious' career ===
Bodacious was to be brought out of retirement one final time in the spring of 1997. On Saturday, April 5, 1997, Terry Don West planned to take on Bodacious for a fifth and final time in an attempt to break their 2-2 tie. Fox Television talked West into it, with the $10,000 purse being donated to Sunrise Children's Hospital. This event was to cap off the $1 million Wrangler Bull Riders Only (BRO) 1996 World Championships at the Thomas & Mack Center.

"I hope this is the last time they buck that bull. He will kill somebody," said West, who was the reigning PRCA World Bull Riding Champion at the time. West nervously climbed into Bodacious' pen for a photography session at Harrah's. The bull was accompanied by a familiar cow and two calves to keep him calm. "He'll tear the pen up," West said. "When I got in there, he gave me a look, saying 'Don't get no closer. You'll pay for it.'"

West, then 31 years old, was slated to wear a chest vest and a face mask. He also pre-purchased additional insurance. "Bo hasn't forgotten how to buck," said West. However, two nights before the match scheduled with Bodacious, West had a match with a bull named Bananarama. Bananarama fell back against the chute while West was getting ready, pinning West and resulting in two black eyes, a broken ankle, and a concussion. West was not able to compete the following night nor to take on Bodacious by Saturday night at their scheduled time. Thus, West's fifth ride with Bodacious never took place. Fox nevertheless donated the money to the children's hospital. This meant that Bo's retirement stayed in effect, and at that time, it was well along the second year.

Bodacious was profiled on BRO telecasts on the Cowboy Lifestyle Network.

== BRO World Champions ==
- 1991 (United States) Mark Cain
- 1992 (United States) Cody Custer
- 1993 (United States) Tuff Hedeman
- 1994 (United States) Gilbert Carrillo
- 1995 (United States) Justin Andrade
- 1996 (United States) Terry Don West

== BRO Bull of the Year ==
- 1993 - Grasshopper
- 1994 - Grasshopper
- 1995 - Grasshopper
- 1996 - Dogface

== See also ==
- Professional Rodeo Cowboys Association
- Professional Bull Riders
- American Bucking Bull
- International Professional Rodeo Association
- Championship Bull Riding
- Women's Professional Rodeo Association
- Canadian Professional Rodeo Association
- Federación Mexicana de Rodeo
- Australian Professional Rodeo Association

== Sources ==
- Peter, Josh (2005). Fried twinkies, buckle bunnies, & bull riders : a year inside the professional bull riders tour. Colorado Springs, Colorado: Rodale, Inc. pp. 138-139. ISBN 978-1-59486-119-2.
- Dallam, Marie W. (2018). "Cowboy Christians". Oxford University Press. p. 173. ISBN 9780190856564.
- "West Takes BRO Championships". No. Jul-Aug 1997. American Cowboy. Active Interest Media, Inc. August 1997. p. 11.
- "No Go On Bo". No. Jul-Aug 1997. American Cowboy. Active Interest Media, Inc. August 1997. p. 11.
- Travis, D.L. (April 1997a). "To Be A Champion". No. Mar-Apr 1997. American Cowboy. Active Interest Media, Inc. pp. 26–27.
- Travis, D.L. (April 1997b). "Bodacious Is Back". No. Mar-Apr 1997. American Cowboy. Active Interest Media, Inc. p. 28.
