= Tuff Hedeman =

American bull rider

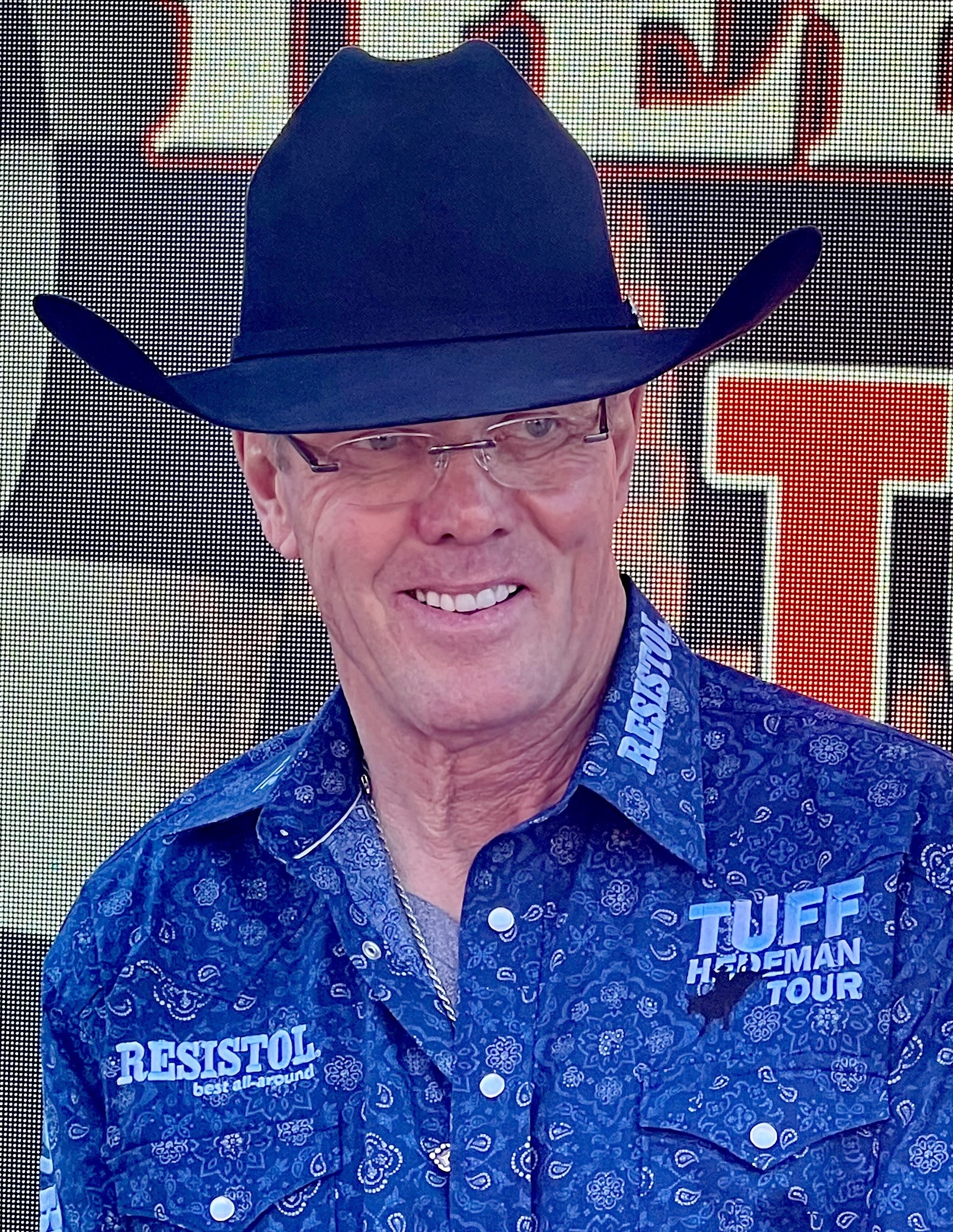
- Hedeman at Las Vegas Motor Speedway in 2024
- Born: Richard Neale Hedeman; March 2, 1963 (age 63); El Paso, Texas, U.S.
- Education: Sul Ross State University
- Occupations: Bull riding event producer; Rancher and team roper; Retired rodeo contestant
- Years active: 1980-1993; 1995-1998 (as a professional bull rider)
- Spouse(s): Tracy Stepp (m. 1986; div. 2015); Liz Rippetoe (m. 2021)
- Children: 4

Richard Neale "Tuff" Hedeman (born March 2, 1963) is an American former professional rodeo cowboy who specialized in bull riding. He won the Professional Rodeo Cowboys Association (PRCA) bull riding world championship three times (1986, 1989 and 1991), as well as the 1995 PBR World Championship. He also won the 1993 world championship for the now-defunct Bull Riders Only (BRO) organization. He is also one of the co-founders of the PBR and is known for having been one of rodeo icon Lane Frost's closest friends. He and the infamous bucking bull, Bodacious, had a few historic clashes. He later served as the President of the PBR and then the President and Ambassador of Championship Bull Riding (CBR). In 2018, he formed his own bull riding organization: the Tuff Hedeman Bull Riding Tour (THBRT).

In 2023, Hedeman was ranked No. 2 on the list of the top 30 bull riders in PBR history.

== Early life and career ==
Richard Neale Hedeman was born in El Paso, Texas, to a family from New Mexico. As a young child, he was with a family friend when he had accidentally slammed Hedeman's hand in his truck's door. When he opened the door to release the boy's hand, the family friend saw that he was not crying. As a result, he nicknamed him "Tough Nut". As Hedeman grew, the nickname was eventually shortened to "Tuff" and it stuck.

Hedeman was raised at the Sunland Park Racetrack, where both his parents, Red and Clarice, were employed. Tuff started his rodeo career at the age of four. Working from groom to exercising racehorses, his growth spurt ended his jockey career at 14 years of age. He idolized rodeo cowboys Donnie Gay and Larry Mahan.

Hedeman won many junior rodeos in his youth. In 1980, he won the high school rodeo bull riding and all-around titles in New Mexico. He won the team roping title and all-around designation again in 1981. After high school, he attended Sul Ross State University in Alpine, Texas. At Sul Ross, he was a member of the rodeo team, competing in saddle bronc riding, team roping, steer wrestling, and bull riding.

Hedeman filled his PRCA permit at a single rodeo in 1983 as a bronc rider. He was known for riding bulls that often had not been ridden. He often traveled with fellow bull riders and close friends, Lane Frost, Cody Lambert, Jim Sharp, Clint Branger, and Ty Murray, to save travel expenses. He qualified for 12 National Finals Rodeos (NFRs). By 1993, he had surpassed $1 million in career earnings and won the 1986, 1989, and 1991 world titles in the PRCA. Frost was killed during a bull riding accident at the 1989 Cheyenne Frontier Days rodeo. When Hedeman won his second world championship at the NFR that year, he successfully rode his last bull for the full eight seconds, and rode him an additional eight seconds in memory of Frost. A neck injury at the NFR in 1993 kept him out of the arena for the entire year of 1994. In that same year, he was portrayed by actor Stephen Baldwin in the Hollywood feature film 8 Seconds about Frost's life. He was actually a stunt double for Baldwin.

Hedeman was instrumental in starting the Professional Bull Riders, Inc. In 1995, he won the PBR World Championship despite an encounter with Bodacious at the PBR World Finals that resulted in numerous broken bones in his face. From 1993 to 1995, Bodacious had been out of competition for long periods due to an injury. However, he returned as a more dangerous animal, having developed a new bucking move "involving him bringing his rear up with his head to the ground, luring a rider to shift his weight forward, and then thrusting his head up full force to smash the rider in the face". Hedeman was jerked down by Bodacious upon exiting the chutes, so he could thrust his head up and smash Hedeman's face, shattering every major facial bone. Hedeman managed to walk out of the arena, but required several hours of reconstructive surgery for his face. The incident resulted in him permanently losing his senses of smell and taste. He spent less than two months recuperating, and at the NFR later that year, he drew Bodacious again— this time, in Round 7. At his son's request, he decided to turn him out— getting off him when he left the chute— and received a standing ovation.

Hedeman barely missed winning a second consecutive PBR world title in 1996, losing to Owen Washburn as he came in second. Hedeman then finished third in the world during the 1997 PBR season. His last ride was at the PBR Bud Light Cup event in Odessa, Texas, in 1998, when in the first round, he landed on his head after getting bucked off and herniated a disc in his previously injured neck, which required surgery. He was leading both the PBR and PRCA world standings in 1998 at the time of his injury. After some consideration, he officially retired in 1999. He is one of the estimated seven to ten riders to have ever ridden Bodacious for the qualified eight seconds, with the stand-out ride being a 95-point ride at the 1993 Bull Riders Only (BRO) World Finals in Long Beach, California.

== Post-career ==
Hedeman served as president of the Professional Bull Riders (PBR) from 1992 to 2004 and was a commentator for televised PBR events from 1999 to 2004.

In January 2005, Hedeman joined the Professional Rodeo Cowboys Association (PRCA) Xtreme Bulls tour and briefly worked as a sideline reporter for televised events. In May of the same year, he became president of Championship Bull Riding (CBR). He worked as chute boss through that year's Xtreme Bulls Tour Finale in September. By 2006, he was working full time at CBR. He served as president from 2005 through 2011 and was a commentator for televised CBR events from 2006 through 2008. He remained with said organization as ambassador and chute boss from 2011 to January 2018.

Hedeman left CBR (which later folded in the summer of 2018) to start his own organization: the Tuff Hedeman Bull Riding Tour (THBRT).

== Personal life ==
Hedeman lives in Stephenville, Texas. His oldest son, Lane, is named after his best friend and fellow champion bull rider, Lane Frost, who died in a rodeo accident in 1989. His younger sons are Trevor, Ryker, and Ripp. He spends his free time traveling to bull riding and team roping events. He married Tracy Stepp in 1986 and they divorced in 2015. He married Liz Rippetoe in 2021. His older brother is Gary "Roach" Hedeman, who was a rodeo bullfighter in the PRCA and PBR, and participated at the 1996 NFR and the PBR World Finals from 1996 through 1999.

== Awards ==
- 1986, 1989, 1991 PRCA Bull Riding World Champion
- 1987, 1989 NFR Bull Riding Average Champion
- 1993 First $1,000,000 Bull Rider
- 1995, 1996 PBR Touring Pro Division Champion
- 1995 PBR World Champion

== Honors ==
- 1988 Cowboy Capital Walk of Fame
- 1997 ProRodeo Hall of Fame
- 1997 El Paso Athletic Hall of Fame
- 1999 PBR Ring of Honor
- 2002 Texas Cowboy Hall of Fame
- 2003 Cheyenne Frontier Days Hall of Fame
- 2010 Texas Rodeo Cowboy Hall of Fame
- 2016 Bull Riding Hall of Fame
- 2017 Molalla Walk of Fame
- 2020 Rodeo Hall of Fame of the National Cowboy & Western Heritage Museum
- 2023 No. 2 on the list of the top 30 bull riders in PBR history
