= Brent Thurman =

American bull rider (1969-1994)

- Born: Brent Cullen Thurman; March 3, 1969; Austin, Texas, U.S.
- Died: December 17, 1994 (aged 25); Las Vegas, Nevada, U.S.
- Resting place: Austin Memorial Park Cemetery in Austin, Texas
- Other name: Hoghead
- Occupation: Professional bull rider
- Years active: 1989–1994

Brent Cullen Thurman (March 3, 1969 – December 17, 1994) was an American professional rodeo cowboy who specialized in bull riding. He competed in the Professional Rodeo Cowboys Association (PRCA), Bull Riders Only (BRO), and Professional Bull Riders (PBR) circuits; the last organization of which he was one of the founding members.

== Early life ==
Brent Thurman was born on March 3, 1969, in Austin, Texas, to Will Thurman and Kay Thurman (née Goodnight). He had an older brother, Brock, who was two and a half years his senior. He grew up in Dripping Springs, Texas. His maternal great-great-great uncle was famous cattle rancher Charles Goodnight.

Thurman's bull riding career began at the age of eight. He also played football, basketball, and golf, and ran track. He won a city golf tournament when he was in high school, but remained focused primarily on bull riding.

== Career ==
Thurman joined the Professional Rodeo Cowboys Association (PRCA) in 1989.

He was a three-time qualifier to the PRCA's Texas Circuit Finals Rodeo.

He joined Bull Riders Only (BRO) in 1991, during its inaugural year, and competed at the first BRO Finals at the Long Beach Sports Arena in Long Beach, California, in March 1992.

In April 1992, Thurman was one of the 21 co-founders of the Professional Bull Riders (PBR). Later in October of that year, he rode at his second BRO Finals; this time at the McNichols Sports Arena in Denver, Colorado.

Thurman volunteered in special rodeos; competitions for physically and mentally disabled youth, and was a judge at bull-riding events throughout Texas in his spare time.

He competed at his third BRO Finals in 1993; the event having returned to Long Beach, California. That same year, he qualified for and competed at his first National Finals Rodeo (NFR), the PRCA's annual year-end world championship rodeo at the Thomas & Mack Center in Las Vegas, Nevada.

In 1994, Thurman competed during the first Bud Light PBR Tour season and rode at the inaugural PBR Bud Light World Finals in Las Vegas' MGM Grand Garden Arena in October. Later that same month, he competed at his fourth straight BRO Finals; the event having returned to Denver.

In December 1994, Thurman qualified for his second straight NFR.

He planned on retiring from bull riding by the age of 30 to then focus his professional career on golf in the Senior PGA Tour.

== Death ==
On December 11, 1994, for the 10th and final round of that year's NFR, Thurman drew the bull Red Wolf, owned by Don Kish. According to his then-girlfriend, Tara Farrell, the normally laidback Thurman nervously asked fellow bull rider Aaron Semas, who was bucked off by Red Wolf in the first round, his thoughts about the bull before they arrived at the Thomas & Mack Center.

Halfway into the ride, Thurman was bucked off and became entangled in his bull rope, which pulled him underneath Red Wolf's hooves and was stomped on the back of his head and neck by the bull's back hooves. Then, Thurman, lying on the arena floor on his left side, kept his head up briefly before slowly lowering it to the ground, losing consciousness. He was quickly tended to by the Justin Sports Medicine Team and rushed out of the arena on a stretcher to University Medical Center's trauma center with severe cranial and facial fractures. Thurman was in a coma and on life support; subsequently succumbing to his injuries six days later, having never regained consciousness. He was 25 years old. Red Wolf was not considered vicious for a bull, and the death was ruled a "freak accident."

Thurman's funeral service was held on December 22, 1994, at the Travis County Exposition Center in Austin, Texas.

Red Wolf's career continued until he was retired in 2000. He died in 2006.

Thurman's father Will died on February 17, 2006, at the age of 66 after battling cancer. His older brother Brock died on July 28, 2021, at the age of 54.

== Honors ==
In 1996, the PBR introduced the Lane Frost/Brent Thurman Award; presented to the bull rider with the highest-marked single ride at the annual PBR World Finals. It was named for Thurman and Lane Frost, who died at the 1989 Cheyenne Frontier Days rodeo, also killed in a bull-riding accident.

From 1999 through 2017, the Brent Thurman Memorial Bull Riding, a PBR-sanctioned event was held in Thurman's honor to raise money for charity.

In 2002, Thurman was posthumously inducted into the Texas Rodeo Cowboy Hall of Fame.

Since 2007, the Brent Thurman Foundation has raised funds to serve the special needs community in and around Austin, Texas.

In 2008, the City of Las Vegas named a frontage road after Thurman; Brent Thurman Way.

In 2011, Thurman was posthumously inducted into the PBR Ring of Honor.
