= Scott Mendes =

American bull rider

Scott Alan Mendes
- 1997 PRCA World Champion bull rider
- Born: July 4, 1969 (age 57); Visalia, California, U.S.
- Occupation: Professional bull rider
- Years active: 1985-2005

Scott Mendes (born July 4, 1969 in Visalia, California) is an American former professional rodeo cowboy who specialized in bull riding. He won the 1997 Professional Rodeo Cowboys Association (PRCA) bull riding world championship, and is the inventor of Rodeo Judge, the original rodeo card game. He was also a co-founder of the Professional Bull Riders (PBR). In 2022, he was inducted into the Bull Riding Hall of Fame.

== Early life and career ==
Mendes was born on July 4, 1969, in Visalia, California, but later moved with his family to Turlock. He started riding bulls at the age of five during a family ranch branding session. His grandfather, Frank Mendes, was a charter member of the predecessor Cowboys Turtles Association, where he competed at Boston Garden and Madison Square Garden in New York City. His father, Alan Mendes rode bulls, but mostly stayed close to home and never really ventured too far from the family ranch. Scott was surrounded by athletic talent within his family. His older brother Mike played football and younger brother Tony also rode bulls. Both Scott and Tony qualified for the PRCA's National Finals Rodeo (NFR) and PBR World Finals. Scott, who was a co-founder of the PBR, qualified for the PBR World Finals in 1994 and 2001; the latter of which was the only year in which he and Tony qualified together for a world championship event.

Scott moved to Nevada with his father after his parents' divorce. He won Nevada State High School bull riding titles in 1985 and 1986. He also qualified for the High School National Finals. In 1988, he finished 2nd to David Berry from Oklahoma for the PRCA Bull Riding Rookie of the Year title after only having his card for two months. Mendes' breakout season came in 1991 when he won the short round and first place in the average at Cheyenne Frontier Days on the 1992 PRCA Bucking Bull of the Year, Rocky, owned by Dan Russell. During his professional career, he qualified for the NFR five times, the Bull Riders Only (BRO) World Finals twice, and the PBR World Finals also twice. He also competed in the Championship Bull Riding (CBR) circuit. Mendes reached the pinnacle and milestone of his bull riding career in 1997 when he won more money than any other bull rider in the PRCA and was crowned the World Champion for said organization that year.

His last professional bull-ride attempt was at the PRCA rodeo in Sonora, Texas, on August 12, 2005.

== Personal life ==
Soon after the death of his fellow bull rider and good friend, Brent Thurman in 1994, Mendes became a "born again" Christian. He responded by wanting to spread the word amongst many of his fellow rodeo cowboys. He and his wife, Angel, are founders, owners and operate Western Harvest Ministries. The national headquarters is an outreach ranch located in Weatherford, Texas. It serves as the foundation for a Christian bull riding league and training camp.

Mendes met his wife Angel during his rise to fame riding bulls. He has two sons, Kaden and Kolten, and a daughter Jorden. His children also exhibit various rodeo talents.

== Philosophical and/or political views ==
Mendes is the Pastor of Western Harvest Ministries, and founder of several Christian organizations building cowboy character for youth. He also travels throughout the country ministering in several churches, and is a corporate motivational speaker. He has made several television appearances on worldwide Christian stations, such as Trinity Broadcasting Network.

== Published works ==
Mendes is a producer of several Christian films, and is the chair for the Fort Worth Christian Media Association. He has also been in several Christian and western films, some of which he helped produce. He is a partner/co-owner in Wings of Eagles Studios, a media group that is restoring "The Code of the West" and American family values to films and media. Their first movie Gold Score is a story about a Texas family, bull riding, and broken dreams. It was written by award-winning Country music songwriter Terrance Alan and screenwriter Phil Merna, who is a Montana cowboy and former bull rider.

In June 2015, Mendes developed a mobile card game called Rodeo Judge with his partner from Christgames.org. It is loosely based on the game of 21. The idea came to him during his rodeo days.

== Awards ==
- National High School Finals Rodeo qualifier (1984, 1985, 1986)
- Nevada High School State Champion bull rider (1985, 1986)
- PRCA Wilderness Circuit finalist (1988, 1989, 1990)
- PRCA Texas Circuit finalist (1991, 1995, 1996)
- NFR qualifier (1991, 1992, 1994, 1996, 1997)
- Wrangler World of Rodeo Champion bull rider (1994, 1996)
- PBR World Finals qualifier (1994, 2001)
- NFR Bull Riding Average Champion (1997)
- PRCA World Champion bull rider (1997)

== Honors ==
- In 2022, Mendes was inducted into the Bull Riding Hall of Fame. That same year, he was inducted into the All Cowboy & Arena Champions Hall of Fame.

== See also ==
- List of Western video games
- Tony Mendes
