= Addielou, Texas =

Unincorporated community in Texas, US

- Unincorporated community
- Location within Texas
- Coordinates: 33.8148300°N 95.2166179°W
- Country: United States
- State: Texas
- County: Red River
- Elevation: 443 ft (135 m)

Addielou is an unincorporated community in Red River County, Texas, United States. Founded c. 1910, by Sam H. Patterson, a post office operated from 1916 to 1925, before being consolidated by Manchester. At its peak, the population was 51, and has a population of 31, as of 2000.
