= Professional Bull Riders =

International professional bull riding organization

- Sport: Bull riding
- Founded: April 12, 1992; 34 years ago
- Owner: TKO Group Holdings
- Competitors: Over 800 total; 40 in highest ranked tour
- Countries: United States; Canada; Brazil; Australia
- Most recent champion: (United States) John Crimber
- Website: pbr.com

The Professional Bull Riders, Inc. (PBR) is an international professional bull riding organization headquartered in Fort Worth, Texas, United States. It is the largest bull riding league in the world, sanctioning hundreds of events every year in the United States, Canada, Brazil, and Australia. Over 800 bull riders from said countries, as well as others, hold PBR memberships.

== History ==
The organization was founded on April 12, 1992, through the efforts of businessman Sam Applebaum and 20 professional bull riders; David Bailey Jr., Clint Branger, Mark Cain, Adam Carrillo, Gilbert Carrillo, Cody Custer, Jerome Davis, Bobby DelVecchio, Mike Erickson, David Fournier, Michael Gaffney, Tuff Hedeman, Cody Lambert, Scott Mendes, Daryl Mills, Ty Murray, Ted Nuce, Aaron Semas, Jim Sharp, and Brent Thurman; most of whom gathered in a hotel room in Scottsdale, Arizona. The bull riders all rode in the Professional Rodeo Cowboys Association (PRCA), the top rodeo organization in the world which had been around for many years, as well as Bull Riders Only (BRO), an all-bull riding organization that had been in existence for just one year. Each founder contributed $1,000 to forming the Professional Bull Riders, Inc. This group was seeking to break away from the rules set by the PRCA and BRO, and form their own bull riding competitions, which included them as well as other top bull riders. "We wanted to create a better product for the fans, so that when they tuned in they were seeing the best of the best every time," said PBR co-founder and nine-time world champion rodeo cowboy Ty Murray, who later served as the president.

The PBR put on a small series of events in 1993 with Bud Light as the primary sponsor, and had its first championship season in 1994 with the Bud Light Cup Series (BLC). The organization has since grown to include five tours in the United States which stage over 100 events every year. Prize money for contestants had exploded from over $330,000 in 1994 to over $11 million in 2008.

The original CEO of the PBR was Sam Applebaum. Randy Bernard became CEO of the PBR in 1995, a position he held until he resigned in 2010 to become the CEO of INDYCAR. When Bernard took over the position of CEO in 1995, it was just after the conclusion of the first World Finals at the MGM Grand Garden Arena in Las Vegas, Nevada. At that time, the PBR's bank account held $8,000 and the organization was $140,000 in debt. Bernard, a bold and wise businessman, quickly went to work. At the end of his first year, he turned things around; the World Finals paid out $1 million in 1996, and increased to $1.5 million in 1999.

In 1996, the PBR made bull riding protective vests, which were introduced three years earlier, mandatory for all contestants at their events. The same was done for bull riders in all other organizations.

After a few years of rivalry between BRO and PBR, the former organization officially went out of business in the spring of 1998.

In 2001, one month after that year's World Finals, the PBR held the Bud Light World Challenge in Austin, Texas, which featured the top riders from the 2001 year-end world standings, as well as some international invitees.

2002 was the last year in which PBR bullfighters wore traditional make-up and baggy outfits. Since the 2003 season, they wear sport jerseys and shorts that feature corporate sponsor logos.

Also in 2003, Ford Trucks, an official PBR sponsor since 2001, replaced Bud Light as the new Premier Series title sponsor; thus the Bud Light Cup Series became the Built Ford Tough Series (BFTS). Bud Light would remain a PBR sponsor through 2007. PBR world champions had always received a year-end money bonus, but starting in 2003, they received a $1 million bonus. Chris Shivers was the first world champion to claim that bonus.

Also in 2003, the PBR purchased Buckers, Inc.; an organization that documented bucking bulls' lineages and put on futurity events for stock contractors to showcase their young bulls for potential use in professional rodeo or bull riding events. They renamed it as American Bucking Bull, Inc. (ABBI) and continued with its practices. The ABBI holds several futurity events in the United States every year and the ABBI Finals have been held every autumn since 2004 in Las Vegas, Nevada.

In 2005, the PBR opened offices in Canada, Mexico, Brazil, and Australia to produce tours in said countries starting the next year.

In 2006, just shortly after that year's World Finals, the PBR held two events in Hawaii. The first was a regular lower-level event, the Myron Duarte Maui Challenge in Wailuku, followed by an event in Honolulu, the Cheeseburger Island Style Hawaii All-Star Challenge, which featured the top 15 riders from the 2006 year-end world standings, as well as five riders that were voted online by fans to compete at the event.

In April 2007, investment firm Spire Capital Partners acquired a majority stake in PBR.

In 2008, the PBR launched the Million Dollar Bull Team Challenge; a series of events in which stock contractor bucked a certain number of bulls at select Built Ford Tough Series events to try to earn money and points for their respective teams. At the beginning of the year, 22 bull teams chipped in $50,000 a piece for their opportunity to win their share of the $1.1 million total competition purse. Out of the 33 Built Ford Tough Series stops held that year, 17 were Bull Team Challenge events, including the PBR World Finals. Each stop had between five and eight bull teams that included five bulls, plus two alternates per team. Each team could only compete in five events. At each Bull Team Challenge stop, the first place team won $20,000, while second place won $10,000. The top bull teams then competed at the PBR World Finals for a $500,000 purse, with $250,000 going to the champion team. The PBR discontinued the Million Dollar Bull Team Challenge after just one year. However, the concept was picked up by another bull riding organization, Championship Bull Riding (CBR) the following year, and the CBR Bull Team Challenge hosted several bull teams competing at regular events, as well as the CBR World Finals. The bull teams racked up points and money and from 2010 to 2018, a year-end CBR Bull Team Challenge champion was crowned. After CBR went out of business in the summer of 2018, the Million Bull Team Challenge returned to its roots by rejoining the PBR and its events are now held at U.S. lower-level PBR events.

In the summer of 2008, the PBR Team Shootout was held. This was a series of five events in which the top 20 riders in the PBR world standings each selected a rider of their choice, and as a team competed against each other for the Team Shootout championship. Each team rode in two of the first four events, held respectively in Del Mar, California; Paso Robles, California; Molalla, Oregon; and Guthrie, Oklahoma. Then, the top 10 teams rode at the finals event in Pueblo, Colorado.

2009 was the first year in which most of the contestants on the PBR's televised Premier Series rode with helmets instead of cowboy hats.

In 2010, a week before the start of that year's World Finals, the PBR held an event in New York City's Times Square which featured the top 10 riders competing for the chance to receive additional points towards the world standings.

On February 23, 2011, the PBR announced that Jim Haworth had become its new CEO. Then on June 29, 2015, the PBR announced that Haworth was promoted to Chairman, while COO Sean Gleason had become the new CEO.

After several years of only holding events in the United States, the ABBI expanded to having futurity events as well as year-end finals in Canada, Australia, and Brazil by the 2010s. After a few years, ABBI Brazil was discontinued, but was revived in late 2024. The ABBI also planned to hold events in Mexico by 2021. However, said project never materialized.

Beginning with the 2013 season, the PBR made it mandatory that all contestants at their events who were born on or after October 15, 1994, ride with a full bull riding helmet. Those born before that date were grandfathered in and permitted to ride with a protective face mask underneath their cowboy hat or simply with their cowboy hat if so desired.

In 2014, shortly before that year's World Finals, the PBR held an event at a beach in Huntington Beach, California, aptly titled "Bulls on the Beach", which featured the top 15 riders attempting to gain additional points towards the world standings.

In April 2015, it was announced that events and talent management firm WME-IMG (now Endeavor) would acquire PBR from Spire Capital Partners, reportedly paying around $100 million.

In 2018, Monster Energy, a PBR sponsor since 2013, replaced Ford Trucks as the new Premier Series title sponsor; thus the Unleash the Beast Series (UTB) tour name replaced the Built Ford Tough Series (BFTS) tour name. That same year, the PBR celebrated its 25th championship season and awarded another $11 million in prize money, which included the bonus to the World Champion Bull Rider of $1 million and the $20,000 gold belt buckle. Ford would remain a PBR sponsor through 2022.

In mid-March 2020, because of the COVID-19 pandemic, several events were either cancelled or rescheduled to later dates. In the spring, the PBR held three UTB events at the Lazy E Arena in Guthrie, Oklahoma, and all were closed to the public to avoid the spread of the virus. In the summer, the organization held the Monster Energy Team Challenge, a series of events in which several teams of four riders competed against each other, and each team was represented by a corporate sponsor. The regular events were held at the South Point Arena in Las Vegas, while the series finale was held at the Denny Sanford Premier Center in Sioux Falls, South Dakota. While the regular events were closed to the public, the championship event allowed fans to attend, but in limited numbers and they needed to socially distance themselves. For the rest of the year, PBR events, including the World Finals, consisted of limited and socially distanced crowds.

The length of the PBR World Finals has changed throughout its history. The inaugural 1994 World Finals was a two-day event; the 1995 World Finals was a five-day event; from 1996 through 2003, it lasted four days; from 2004 through 2009 it lasted seven days, but was split into two weekends, with the first three days taking place the first weekend, followed by the next four days taking the following weekend; from 2010 through 2019, it was again a five-day event; in 2020 and 2021, it was again a four-day event; in 2022 and 2023, it went back to being a seven-day event with the first three days taking place one weekend, then the next four days taking place the following weekend. Since 2024, the World Finals is an eight-day event; the first four days of the event are followed by two days off, then the next two days are followed by another day off, then the final two days conclude the event.

From 2007 through 2010, the PBR hosted a team competition format called the PBR World Cup, where 25 bull riders (altogether representing the five countries where PBR events are sanctioned) competed to win the title of best bull riding country in the world. The 2007 PBR World Cup was held at the Gold Coast Convention and Exhibition Centre in Gold Coast, Queensland, Australia; the 2008 World Cup at the Manuel Bernardo Aguirre Gymnasium in Chihuahua City, Chihuahua, Mexico; the 2009 World Cup at the Parque do Peão in Barretos, São Paulo, Brazil; and the 2010 World Cup at the Thomas & Mack Center in Las Vegas, Nevada, United States. The PBR World Cup was never held in Canada.

From 2017 through 2020, and again in 2022, another event, the PBR Global Cup, offered bull riders a chance to compete in a five country competition. This event was a different format from the PBR World Cup; it was not a continuation of the old event. Like the World Cup, the Global Cup was staged annually across the countries where PBR events are sanctioned. National team riders were matched against the best of each. The home country was granted a competitive advantage. It was a series that visited each nation each year and continued until one nation held all five pieces of the Global Cup—including the native soil of each territory. Thus, only one country could be claimed the Toughest Nation on Dirt. The 2017 PBR Global Cup was held at Rogers Place in Edmonton, Alberta, Canada; the 2018 Global Cup at the Qudos Bank Arena in Sydney, New South Wales, Australia; and the 2019 & 2020 Global Cups at AT&T Stadium in Arlington, Texas, United States. Because the five PBR countries had different protocols during the COVID-19 pandemic, the Global Cup was ultimately not held in 2021. However, it returned to AT&T Stadium in 2022. The PBR Global Cup was never held in Mexico or Brazil.

The PBR's Mexico circuit took a hard financial hit in 2020 as a result of the COVID-19 pandemic; all scheduled events for the year were canceled due to pandemic restrictions and there were no events in 2021 due to continued restrictions. By 2022, things had returned to normal for the most part in the country, but there were still no PBR events. In the spring of 2023, a PBR event was held on Mexican soil for the first time since 2019. However, this would soon turn out to be PBR Mexico's final event and the circuit folded shortly thereafter.

From 2020 through 2022, the PBR held Cowboys for a Cause; an event that featured sponsored teams of three bull riders competing against each other in a winner-take-all format while donating money to charitable causes. During its first two years, the event took place on the launch deck of the USS Lexington in Corpus Christi, Texas, and was held in conjunction with the Air Force Reserve to support military causes in Texas. The 2020 event took place in the autumn, after the conclusion of that year's PBR World Finals, while the one in 2021 took place on Labor Day Weekend. The 2022 edition took place at King Ranch in Kingsville, Texas, also during Labor Day Weekend and donations from that event went towards conservation and sustainability efforts across Texas. A donation to the Texas and Southwestern Cattle Raisers Association was also included and the money was to be distributed to multiple local and rural fire departments that helped landowners fight wildfires across Texas earlier in the year.

On November 5, 2021, a new tour was announced; the PBR Team Series. It debuted in 2022 and runs from the summer to autumn of every year. The first eight teams and their respective owners were announced on January 6, 2022. The teams representing different regions of the United States go head-to-head against each other in events in each of the teams' respective hometowns, as well as two "neutral site" events. The season culminates with the Team Series Championship, which is held at T-Mobile Arena in Las Vegas. The year-end champion team wins a trophy shaped like a giant belt buckle, as well as a large money bonus. Each individual member of the champion team also wins a regular-sized championship belt buckle and money bonus. The team's ownership group also wins a money bonus. During the Team Series' inaugural 2022 season, the PBR awarded the MVP (the individual rider that scored the most points during the Team Series regular season) with a $50,000 bonus. Beginning in 2023, in addition to the award, the year-end MVP receives a 100,000 bonus. Since 2023, the PBR has also awarded an MVP of the Team Series Championship event with a $10,000 bonus. The other teams that finish in the top four of the Championship event, including each individual team member and ownership group, also receive a year-end money bonus. On February 23, 2024, the PBR announced the addition of two new teams to the series. On March 30, 2026, the organization announced plans to add two new teams in 2027.

The trophy cup that the PBR's annual individual world champion receives in addition to the gold belt buckle and money bonus was originally called the Bud Light Cup from 1994 through 2002. However, when Bud Light was no longer the Premier Series' title sponsor by 2003, it was referred to simply as the PBR Cup or PBR Championship Trophy. In 2022, the trophy cup was officially renamed the Jerome Robinson Cup; in honor of former bull rider and longtime PBR arena director Jerome Robinson, who died that year.

In September 2022, it was announced that the PBR Hall of Fame would be located at the National Cowboy & Western Heritage Museum in Oklahoma City, Oklahoma, within the museum's American Rodeo Gallery. It opened the following year.

From June through August 2022, the PBR hosted lower-level tour events on Sundays at Cowtown Coliseum in Fort Worth, Texas. Since 2023, these events take place at the venue on most Thursdays of the calendar year. Cowtown Coliseum was the site of the very first PBR event in April 1993.

Previously, points won by riders at all levels of PBR competition, American and international, counted towards the world standings for the PBR world championship. However, since 2023, only points won on the U.S. Premier Series count towards the world championship race. Points won on the U.S. lower-level tours and international circuits leading up to and including the Velocity Tour Finals are jumbled together into what is known as the Velocity Global standings, which count towards the Velocity Tour championship race. The same is done during the Challenger Series season, with the points won on mentioned tours leading up to and including the Challenger Series Championship event being jumbled together into the Challenger Global standings.

The PBR World Finals was held in Las Vegas, Nevada, for over 25 years. The inaugural 1994 World Finals was held at the city's MGM Grand Garden Arena. The event remained at that venue through 1998. In 1999, the PBR moved the World Finals to the Thomas & Mack Center. The organization was stretching its current arena's limits and really needed a bigger arena. They wanted to stay in Las Vegas, so the Thomas & Mack Center was the place to go. From 2004 through 2007, the first weekend of the World Finals was held at the Mandalay Bay Events Center, followed by the next weekend taking place at the Thomas & Mack Center. In 2008 and 2009, both weekends of the World Finals took place at the Thomas & Mack Center. The World Finals remained at the Thomas & Mack Center through 2015. In 2016, the PBR moved the World Finals to the T-Mobile Arena on the Las Vegas Strip. In 2020, as a result of the COVID-19 pandemic and Nevada state restrictions on large events, the World Finals were moved to AT&T Stadium in Arlington, Texas, with a limited and socially distanced crowd for every day of competition. The event returned to T-Mobile Arena in Las Vegas for the final time in 2021. The World Finals were relocated to Dickies Arena in Fort Worth, Texas, in 2022 and were held there in 2023, as well. In 2024 and 2025, the event was split into two different venues in two different cities in the Dallas–Fort Worth metroplex; the first six days taking place at Cowtown Coliseum in Fort Worth, then the final two days taking place at AT&T Stadium in Arlington. In 2026, the World Finals took place entirely in Fort Worth, again; the first four days were held at Cowtown Coliseum, then the next four days were held at Dickies Arena. In 2027, the first four days of the PBR World Finals will remain in Cowtown Coliseum. However, the next four days will now be held at Desert Diamond Arena in Glendale, Arizona.

The PBR was originally headquartered in Irvine, California, before moving to downtown Colorado Springs, Colorado, in 1995. By 2007, the organization had enough of its cramped office in Colorado Springs, so they moved their world headquarters to a new four-story building on the Historic Arkansas Riverwalk in Pueblo, Colorado. In 2024, they once again relocated their world headquarters; this time to the Stockyards in Fort Worth, Texas.

In October 2024, it was announced that PBR would be sold to TKO Group Holdings—originally established as a merger between Endeavor-owned mixed martial arts promotion UFC and professional wrestling company WWE—as part of a larger, $3.25 billion agreement expected to close in 2025. The proposed sale is connected to Silver Lake Partners' plans to take Endeavor private, and also includes IMG and sports hospitality firm On Location Experiences. The deal was completed on February 28, 2025.

At the 2025 Cynopsis Sports Media Awards, PBR was honored as Sports League of the Year.

Since 2024, each rider 21 years of age or older who scores the highest-marked ride at each Premier Series event, who wins each Premier Series event, and who is the MVP of each Team Series event wins a money bonus courtesy of Belgian brewer AB InBev. Originally from Michelob Ultra, it is now sponsored by fellow InBev brand Busch Light since 2026.

== Organization ==
More than 800 bull riders from the United States, Canada, Brazil, Australia, and other countries hold PBR memberships, and compete in PBR-sanctioned events in the four mentioned countries. At the end of each season, the PBR world champion receives a $1 million bonus, trophy cup, and championship gold belt buckle.

The PBR has become one of the most globally successful television sports programs. Total viewership, including live event attendees and the television audience, grew 52 percent between 2002 and 2004. In 2004, 16.4 million fans watched or attended a PBR event. By 2008, over 100 million watched the PBR on television, and over 1.7 million attended a live event. In 1995, roughly 310,000 fans attended an event. Now, around 3 million fans attend a live event.

== Competition ==
A qualified ride is worth up to 100 points. That is, 50 points for the rider and 50 points for the bull when he successfully rides the bull for eight seconds. An event has four judges, all former bull riders themselves. Each judge may award up to 25 points. Two judges score the rider, and two judges score the bull. All of the judges' scores are tallied together. That figure is divided by two for the official score. One-half of the possible score is based on the bull's performance. The two judges score the bull on how rank (difficult to ride) he is. Two judges score the rider on how proficient he is. The rider has to stay on top of the bull for eight seconds and ride with one free hand. He is disqualified if he touches himself, the bull, the riding equipment, or the ground with his free arm during the course of the ride. Any ride that is scored 90 points or higher is deemed exceptional. The highest score in the PBR is 98.75 points. Each Premier Series event always has four judges. At the end of each event, the top 12 riders compete in the Championship Round; the rider with the highest point total from the entire event becomes the champion.

== PBR tours ==
The PBR started their inaugural championship season in 1994 with one tour. Today, it offers five tours in the United States. Eligibility of contestants at each level is based on previous performance.

=== Current U.S. tours ===
==== Premier Series ====
The Premier Series is where the best riders and bulls compete, and it culminates at the PBR World Finals at the end of the regular season where the world champion is crowned. Due to sponsorship changes, the Premier Series has had different titles throughout its history. It was known as the Bud Light Cup Series (BLC) from 1994 through 2002, the Built Ford Tough Series (BFTS) from 2003 through 2017, and since 2018 has been known as the Unleash the Beast Series (UTB).

The PBR World Finals were held in Las Vegas, Nevada, for over a quarter century. They were held at the city's MGM Grand Garden Arena from 1994 through 1998, the Thomas & Mack Center from 1999 through 2015 (the first weekend of the World Finals from 2004 through 2007 was held at the Mandalay Bay Events Center), and T-Mobile Arena from 2016 through 2019. In 2020, due to COVID-19 restrictions, the World Finals were relocated to AT&T Stadium in Arlington, Texas. The World Finals returned to Las Vegas' T-Mobile Arena for the final time in 2021.

In the past, the Premier Series schedule lasted the regular calendar year, with the concluding PBR World Finals taking place in the autumn. However, by 2022, the Premier Series schedule was shortened; running from winter to spring. Also, the PBR World Finals were moved to Dickies Arena in Fort Worth, Texas, that year and were held there in 2023, as well. In 2024 and 2025, the World Finals took place at two different venues in two different cities in the Dallas–Fort Worth metroplex; the first six days were held at Cowtown Coliseum in Fort Worth, then the final two days were held at AT&T Stadium in Arlington. In 2026, the World Finals took place entirely in Fort Worth, again; the first four days were held at Cowtown Coliseum, then the next four days were held at Dickies Arena. In 2027, the first four days of the PBR World Finals will remain in Cowtown Coliseum. However, the next four days will now be held at Desert Diamond Arena in Glendale, Arizona.

==== Touring Pro Division ====
In 1995, the PBR launched the Touring Pro Division; a minor league tour that allowed riders to compete at lower-level events to work their way up to the elite series. In 2001, it was renamed as the Challenger Tour. In subsequent years, the PBR would launch other lower-level tours: the Enterprise Rent-A-Car Tour and the Discovery Tour. Money won on these two tours counted towards the Challenger Tour standings. On 1 January 2010, the PBR announced the discontinuation of the Enterprise and Discovery tours and the Challenger Tour was changed back to its original title of the Touring Pro Division.

From 1997 through 2000, Double-H Boots was the Touring Pro Division's presenting sponsor. In 2001, when the series was renamed the Challenger Tour, U.S. Smokeless Tobacco Company became its title sponsor, and this lasted through 2007. In 2008 and 2009, U.S. Smokeless Tobacco Company's Copenhagen brand was the tour's new title sponsor. In 2010, when the Challenger Tour was renamed back to its original title of the Touring Pro Division, the series did not have a title sponsor again until 2012, when Lucas Oil picked up the mantle, and this lasted through 2020. The Touring Pro Division has not had a title sponsor since then.

The Touring Pro Division schedule used to last throughout the regular calendar year. However, as of 2022, like the Premier Series, now runs from winter through spring.

From 1995 through 2012, the year-end champion of this tour was the rider who won the most money throughout the season and from 2013 through 2021, it was the rider who won the most points throughout the season. Throughout its history, the finals event for this tour was held respectively in different locations such as the Lazy E Arena in Guthrie, Oklahoma; the National Western Complex in Denver, Colorado; the Ohio Expo Center in Columbus, Ohio; the Ford Center in Oklahoma City, Oklahoma; and the Gwinnett Center in Duluth, Georgia. 2009 was the last year in which this tour had a season-ending finals event.

==== Velocity Tour ====
Since 2014, The Velocity Tour features young and up-coming talent competing against the established talent of the sport, bringing events to cities across the United States that are not included in the Premier Series. Every winner of a Velocity Tour regular-season event is seeded at one Premier Series event during the season, and if that rider wins enough points at the Premier Series event, he has the chance to earn a full-time spot in said tour. BlueDEF was the Velocity Tour's first title sponsor, lasting from 2014 through 2016. In 2017 and 2018, Real Time Pain Relief was the tour's title sponsor. Since 2019, Pendleton Whisky has been the title sponsor.

The Velocity Tour Finals take place a few days before the start of the PBR World Finals. During its first year in 2014, there was no Velocity Tour finals event, and the year-end champion was the rider who won the most points throughout the season after the completion of the last event of the year. However, there has been a Velocity Tour Finals since 2015. The first Velocity Tour Finals in said year was held at the KFC Yum! Center in Louisville, Kentucky. From 2016 through 2019, the Velocity Tour Finals took place at the South Point Arena in Las Vegas, Nevada. In 2020, due to COVID-19 restrictions, the finals were moved to the Denny Sanford Premier Center in Sioux Falls, South Dakota. The 2021 Velocity Tour Finals returned to the South Point Arena in Las Vegas for the final time. In 2022, the Velocity Tour Finals moved to the American Bank Center (renamed the Hilliard Center in September 2025) in Corpus Christi, Texas, to be held in conjunction with Rodeo Corpus Christi, and like the Premier Series and Touring Pro Division, the Velocity Tour now takes place from winter to spring after having previously taken place throughout the regular calendar year and concluding in the autumn.

==== Team Series ====
Debuting in 2022, the PBR Team Series features teams of bull riders representing different regions of the United States competing against each other. There were eight founding teams during the first two seasons. Each team has seven protected roster riders and can have a maximum of five reserve roster riders in cases of riders on the protected roster getting injured during the season. There are regular-season events taking place in each respective team's hometowns, as well as two "neutral site" events. The season culminates with the Team Series Championship at T-Mobile Arena in Las Vegas, Nevada. The PBR Team Series runs from the summer to autumn of every year. In its inaugural year, there were two preseason events in Bismarck, North Dakota, and Mill Spring, North Carolina. From 2023 through 2025, Camping World was the tour's title sponsor. In 2024, two new teams were added.

During the first two seasons, all eight teams competed at the Championship at T-Mobile Arena. However, in 2024, only the top six teams in terms of points earned during the regular season were guaranteed to automatically qualify for the Championship. One day before the start of the Championship event, the bottom four teams competed in an elimination-style round known as the Ride-In Round, which took place at the South Point Hotel Arena, where they battled it out for the final two qualification spots to the Team Series Championship at T-Mobile Arena. In 2025, the PBR discontinued the Ride-In Round, meaning all 10 teams will compete at the Team Series Championship.

The teams are as follows:

Team	City	Arena	Owner	Head Coach	Reference
Arizona Ridge Riders	Glendale, Arizona (2022–present)	Desert Diamond Arena (2022–present)	Thomas Tull (2022–present)	Colby Yates (2022–present); Paulo Crimber (2022–2023)	
(Texas) Austin Gamblers	Austin, Texas (2022–present)	Moody Center (2022–present)	Egon Durban (2022–present)	Michael Gaffney (2022–present)	
(North Carolina) Carolina Cowboys	Winston-Salem, North Carolina (2022); Greensboro, North Carolina (2023–present)	Lawrence Joel Veterans Memorial Coliseum (2022); First Horizon Coliseum (2023–present)	Professional Bull Riders, Inc. (2022); Richard Childress and Jeff Broin (2023–present)	Jerome Davis (2022–present)	
Florida Freedom	Oklahoma City, Oklahoma (2022–2023); Sunrise, Florida (2024–present)	Paycom Center (2022–2023); Amerant Bank Arena (2024–present)	Professional Bull Riders, Inc. (2022); Heath Freeman (2023–present)	Cord McCoy (2022–2023); Paulo Crimber (2024–present)	
(Missouri) Kansas City Outlaws	Kansas City, Missouri (2022–present)	T-Mobile Center (2022–present)	Phil Pulley (2022–present)	J.W. Hart (2022–present)	
Missouri Thunder	Ridgedale, Missouri (2022–2023, 2026–present); Springfield, Missouri (2024–2025)	Thunder Ridge Nature Arena (2022–2023, 2026–present); Great Southern Bank Arena (2024–2025)	Johnny Morris (2022–present)	Ross Coleman (2022–present); Luke Snyder (2022–2023)	
(Tennessee) Nashville Stampede	Nashville, Tennessee (2022–present)	Bridgestone Arena (2022–present)	Morris Communications (2022–present)	Justin McBride (2022–present)	
(New York (state)) New York Mavericks	Brooklyn, New York (2024); Elmont, New York (2025–present)	Barclays Center (2024); UBS Arena (2025–present)	Marc Lasry (2024–present)	Kody Lostroh (2024–present)	
Oklahoma Wildcatters	Oklahoma City, Oklahoma (2024–present)	Paycom Center (2024–present)	Talor Gooch (2024–present)	J.B. Mauney (2024–2026); Greg Rhodes (2026); Shawn Ramirez (2026–present)	
Texas Rattlers	Fort Worth, Texas (2022–present)	Ariat Arena (2022–present); Cowtown Coliseum (2024)	John J. Fisher (2022–present)	Cody Lambert (2022–present)	

==== Challenger Series ====
Also new in 2022, the Challenger Series runs from the summer through autumn and works as a way for riders to compete at PBR events in the United States as individuals during the Team Series season. Riders that are members of a Team Series squad can compete at Challenger Series events when there is not a Team Series event scheduled on the same weekend. This tour also works as a series of scouting events for Team Series managements looking to add riders as alternates to their teams in cases of riders on the protected rosters getting injured or in cases of riders getting traded to different teams.

The Challenger Series Championship takes place at the South Point Arena in Las Vegas, Nevada, before the start of the PBR Team Series Championship at Las Vegas' T-Mobile Arena.

In 2026, Ram Trucks became the title sponsor of the Challenger Series.

=== International tours ===
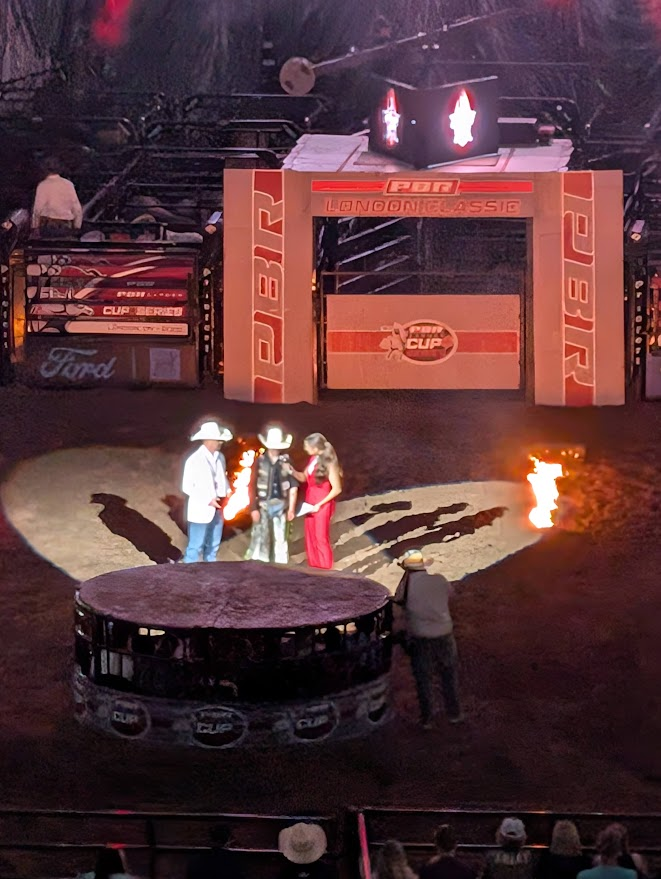
A rider speaking to a television host at a 2025 PBR event in London, Ontario

In 2006, the PBR launched tours in Canada, Mexico, Brazil, and Australia. Each circuit has finals events that crown year-end champions for each respective country. Beginning in 2014 and annually since 2025, some PBR events are also held in New Zealand. Also in 2014, the PBR had plans to host some events in China. However, they never took place. After three years of struggling to hold events, the Mexico circuit officially closed its doors in 2023.

== Broadcasting in the United States ==
=== 1993–2002 ===
The Nashville Network (TNN) began televising a small number of PBR-sanctioned events in 1993. The following year, the PBR had its first official championship season with the Bud Light Cup Series (BLC), which included a year-end world finals event with TNN remaining the organization's official channel. TNN's name was changed from The Nashville Network to The National Network late in the 2000 season.

After the 2001 season, a special PBR event, the Bud Light World Challenge in Austin, Texas, was broadcast on NBC. The National Network was rebranded as The New TNN in late 2001. The final event of the 2002 BLC regular season was broadcast on CBS. The New TNN remained the PBR's primary channel through the 2002 Bud Light Cup World Finals.

=== 2003–2011 ===
The PBR's Premier Series, known as the Built Ford Tough Series (BFTS) as of the 2003 season, was now primarily televised on the Outdoor Life Network (OLN) with select events being broadcast on NBC. From 2003 through 2006, select BFTS events were also broadcast on Telemundo for Spanish-speaking viewers. During that same time period, OLN also televised some PBR Challenger Tour events. Late in the 2006 season, OLN's name was changed to Versus.

Non-BFTS PBR events that were televised on Versus included the 2006 Cheeseburger Island Style Hawaii All-Star Challenge in Honolulu, Hawaii; the 2006 Challenger Tour Finals in Oklahoma City, Oklahoma; the 2007 World Cup in Gold Coast, Queensland, Australia; the 2007 Challenger Tour Finals also in Oklahoma City; the 2008 World Cup in Chihuahua City, Chihuahua, Mexico; the 2009 World Cup in Barretos, São Paulo, Brazil; the 2009 Challenger Tour Finals in Duluth, Georgia; and the 2010 World Cup in Las Vegas, Nevada, United States. The final long rounds and championship rounds of the last few regular-season BFTS events from 2006 through 2008 were broadcast on Fox. In the summer of 2008, the four regular-season events of the PBR Team Shootout were televised on ESPN2, while the championship event was broadcast on ESPN.

In 2010, CBS broadcast a bonus round that was held in New York City's Times Square, which featured the PBR's top ten riders competing for a chance to win additional points a week before that year's World Finals. In April 2011, the Last Cowboy Standing BFTS event in Las Vegas, Nevada, was televised via pay-per-view. Versus remained the PBR's primary channel through the 2011 Built Ford Tough World Finals.

=== 2012–2021 ===
In 2012, CBS Sports Network became the PBR's primary channel, while CBS and NBC began to broadcast the 15/15 Bucking Battle; a bonus round that featured the top 15 PBR riders at the time of competition against 15 of the top PBR bulls in select regular-season BFTS events that gave the riders an opportunity to earn additional points. That same year, Versus became NBC Sports Network and select BFTS events were also televised on said channel.

By 2013, PBR events in the United States were now televised exclusively on CBS Sports Network and CBS. In July of that year, PBR live-streamed an event via pay-per-view on the now-defunct Epicentre.tv. It was the Touring Pro Division event in Big Sky, Montana. Said website live-streamed some BFTS events in Spanish later that same year and in 2014 free of charge. In 2014, some PBR Touring Pro Division and Velocity Tour events, the Bulls on the Beach 15/15 Bucking Battle in Huntington Beach, California, as well as the World Finals were also streamed live for free on the PBR LIVE website.

In 2015, PBR LIVE streamed the BFTS and Velocity Tour for free on CarbonTV. In May of that year, the PBR again made an event available via pay-per-view; it being the Velocity Tour event in Decatur, Texas. The main draw of the event that year was a segment called Unfinished Business, in which eight retired PBR riders attempted to ride one final bull and the winning rider earning a large winner-take-all money prize.

In 2016 and 2017, PBR LIVE went back to being its own independent website (which would eventually become defunct) and events were again streamed there for free. The PBR's website and mobile app live-streamed the 2017 Global Cup in Edmonton, Alberta, Canada. In 2018, the PBR's Premier Series name was changed from the Built Ford Tough Series (BFTS) to the Unleash the Beast Series (UTB). That same year, the organization launched a subscription-based over-the-top service known as RidePass, which streamed UTB events and lower-level tour events, as well as PBR-produced events for other western-sport organizations. RidePass also streamed the 2018 Global Cup in Sydney, New South Wales, Australia, and the 2019 Global Cup in Arlington, Texas, United States. From 2018 to 2020, the PBR's events on RidePass were also streamed on FloSports' now-defunct FloRodeo service.

In 2019, the PBR signed on to have CBS Sports as their exclusive television partner through 2028. CBS Sports Network televised the regular-season events of the Monster Energy Team Challenge held in Las Vegas, while CBS broadcast the championship event in Sioux Falls, South Dakota. CBS Sports Network also televised the 2020 and 2022 Global Cup; both also in Arlington, Texas. CBS televised the 2020 and 2021 Cowboys for a Cause events; both aboard the USS Lexington in Corpus Christi, Texas. In July 2021, RidePass was relaunched as a free ad-supported streaming television (FAST) service, carried on Paramount Global sister platform Pluto TV.

=== 2022–2023 ===
The UTB series season went from lasting all year to being condensed to winter and spring beginning in 2022. CBS Sports Network continued to televise the regular-season UTB events and the World Finals, while CBS broadcast the 15/15 Bucking Battles. Beginning in 2022, UTB events were also streamed on Paramount+. Also beginning that year, the PBR Team Series, which runs from summer to autumn, was televised on CBS Sports Network and CBS, and streamed on RidePass and Paramount+. CBS televised the 2022 edition of Cowboys for a Cause at King Ranch in Kingsville, Texas. In July 2023, the PBR reached an agreement with TelevisaUnivision for Spanish-language rights in the United States and Mexico, airing on TUDN and streamed on Vix Premium.

=== 2024–present ===
2024 was the last year of the 15/15 Bucking Battles. That same season, PBR renewed its contract with CBS Sports (which was to originally expire in 2025) through 2030, expanding it to 25 hours of programming annually. This would continue to include selected Team Series and UTB events, as well as American Bucking Bull Inc. (ABBI) futurity events. In addition, PBR reached an agreement with Phil McGraw's new media company Merit Street Media, under which Merit TV would carry Team Series and UTB Series events (replacing the package formerly seen on CBS Sports Network). Under this contract, PBR began to adopt standardized broadcast windows allowing for live coverage. It also began to introduce pre- and post- shows, as well as the studio show PBR Now. In November 2024, PBR terminated its contract with Merit Street Media, citing ongoing disputes with the company and non-payment of rights fees. The coverage previously carried on Merit TV became available for free via PBR's mobile app, PBR's YouTube channel, and RidePass on Pluto TV.

Since 2025, the majority of UTB regular-season events include Team Series exhibition events known as the Monster Energy Team Challenge, which consist of two teams competing against each other after the completion of the first round of the regular UTB event. Team Challenge events are broadcast on CBS. The 2025 PBR World Finals were also televised live on The Cowboy Channel. In July 2025, PBR announced new agreements to supplant the collapsed Merit TV deal, with Fox Nation acquiring season 2 of Last Cowboy Standing and a ten-week PBR Friday Night Live package beginning in August 2025, and CW Sports acquiring Saturday and Sunday Team Series broadcasts.

In November 2025, it was announced that Unleash the Beast Series events would return exclusively to Paramount+ under a five-year deal beginning in the 2026 season, aligned with the final year of its overall contract with CBS Sports (which will continue to feature its existing Team Challenge "Game of the Week" package on the CBS network).

Since 2026, the first two days of Team Series events are now streamed exclusively on Paramount+, while the CBS network continues to broadcast the Game of the Week. In November of that same year, it was announced that a new multi-year agreement made The CW the exclusive live broadcast home of PBR Team Series events on Sundays through 2029. Team Series events will also stream live via CW Sports on the ESPN App with an ESPN Unlimited subscription.

== Current statistics ==
The PBR website tracks many statistics regarding the performances of bull riders and bulls during the season and throughout its history. There is the 90-Points Club, which has been tracking rides that have been scored over 90 points since 1998. Then there is the high marked bull ride statistic, which has been tracked for many seasons. Each season it tracks the highest bull scores throughout and until the World Finals have concluded. And then there is the all time money earners statistic, which tallies the bull riders in order of who has earned the most money in their careers. Additionally, the success rate for an 8-second ride was 46 percent in 1995, had dropped to 26 percent by 2012, then climbed roughly 3 percent to about 29 percent for 2017 and 2018. This lower modern rate has been attributed to the selective breeding of bulls.

=== 90-Point Club ===
In 2002, the U.S. Smokeless Tobacco Company developed the original 90-Point Club. Each contestant who scored 90 or more at a Bud Light Cup Series event shared in bonus money of $90,000. The money was distributed after the World Finals event. It was divided equally by all the qualified rides. The competitor with the most 90-point rides received an additional bonus of $10,000. That competitor also became the 90-Point Club Champion. In 2003, it was added that for each 90-point ride that a bull makes, the stock contractor received $1,000. For that $1,000, half came from the U.S. Smokeless Tobacco Company and the other half came from B&W Trailer Hitches.

The first statistic kept is the most 90-point rides since 1998. José Vitor Leme holds first place with 96 rides; Chris Shivers is in second place with 94 rides; J.B. Mauney holds third place with 75 rides; Justin McBride is at fourth place at 74 rides; and Guilherme Marchi is at fifth place with 51 rides. Shivers, Mauney, McBride and Marchi are all retired, so all their numbers will stay the same. New for 2018 was the most 90-point rides for the year and the contractor 90-point rides for the year. Lastly, are the historic 90-point rides trailing all the way back to 1998. They are ordered by the highest to lowest ride score. The rides list the rider, the bull, the contractor, the location, and the ride score.

=== High-marked bull ===
These statistics keep track of the current season's elite tour event's high marked bulls. B.O.T. stands for buck off time. Each event has a high-marked bull. The top 100 bulls scores are also tracked here.

=== Highest scored ride ===
The perfect score in bull riding is 100 points. For several years, the highest score in the PBR was 96.5 points, which was achieved four times. The mark was originally set by Bubba Dunn, who rode Promiseland (owned by Terry Williams) at the 1999 Bud Light Cup event in Tampa, Florida. The record was later tied in 2000 by Chris Shivers, who rode Jim Jam (owned by Logan & Williams) also at the Bud Light Cup event in Tampa. Shivers would repeat the score in 2001 when he rode Dillinger (owned by Herrington Cattle Company) in Las Vegas, Nevada, at the PBR World Finals. The most recent 96.5 point ride was in 2004, when Michael Gaffney rode Little Yellow Jacket (owned by Berger Bucking Bulls) at the Built Ford Tough Series event in Nampa, Idaho.

In 2021, new records for third highest, second highest, and highest scored rides in PBR history were all set on the same bull, Woopaa (owned by Barker Bulls and Hookin' W Ranch). The new record for highest scored ride was originally set in the summer, when José Vitor Leme rode Woopaa for 97.75 points at the Unleash the Beast event in Tulsa, Oklahoma. A new record for second-highest score in PBR history was later set in the autumn when Dalton Kasel rode Woopaa for 96.75 points at the Unleash the Beast event in San Antonio, Texas. The record for highest scored ride in PBR history was later broken at the World Finals in Las Vegas when José Vitor Leme rode Woopaa for 98.75 points.

In September 2024, the record for second-highest scored ride in PBR history was broken when Cássio Dias rode Man Hater (owned by Jane Clark and Gene Owen) for 98.25 points at the Camping World Team Series event in Fort Worth, Texas.

=== Highest bull score ===
Even though riders receive no score if they buck off their bulls before the required eight seconds, bulls receive scores for every outing, with the perfect bull score being 50 points. For several years, the highest bull score in PBR history was 49 points, which was achieved twice; the first time being in 2000 when Hercules (owned by Flying U / Rosser Rodeo) bucked off Gilbert Carrillo at the Bud Light Cup event in Portland, Oregon, and again when Hammer (owned by Tony Sharp and Zaunbrecher) bucked off Cory Rasch at the 2003 Built Ford Tough Series event in Uncasville, Connecticut.

In 2024, the record for highest bull score in PBR history was broken when Man Hater bucked off Sage Kimzey at the Camping World Team Series event in Kansas City, Missouri, and was scored 49.5 points.

=== All-time money earners ===
The all-time moneys show off the PBR's claim that they have changed bull riding into a real sport that does more than just pay the riders' fees. Three-time world champion José Vitor Leme has earned the most money of any PBR bull rider at over $8.7 million. He is followed by two-time world champion J.B. Mauney at over $7.4 million. In third place is three-time world champion Silvano Alves at over $6.7 million. They are followed by fellow world champions Guilherme Marchi with over $5.3 million and Justin McBride with over $5.1 million.

== Previous challenges ==
=== Mossy Oak Shootout ===
Starting with the 2000 season, this challenge sponsored by the Mossy Oak camouflage brand was a bonus ride that was featured during first night of each two-day Premier Series event. The Shootout matched up the event's first-round winner against a prearranged bucking bull. The rider had to make an eight-second qualified ride to win the Mossy Oak Shootout bonus. In the event that he failed, $5,000 would be added to the bounty, and the new amount would be offered at the next two-day event's Mossy Oak Shootout. The bonus capped out at $100,000, and when a rider made the whistle and collected his bonus, the bounty was then reset to $5,000 at the next event. If the rider made a qualified ride, he was given a score, but those points did not count towards the world standings.

During the Bud Light Cup Series (BLC) era, Justin McBride was the first rider to successfully conquer his bull and win the Mossy Oak Shootout bonus by riding Freckles for $15,000 in Greensboro, North Carolina, in 2000. Subsequent winners of the Shootout included Aaron Semas who received $15,000 on Copperhead (St. Louis, Missouri; 2000), Chris Shivers who acquired $5,000 on Dillinger (Fort Worth, Texas; 2000), Chris Shivers again who pocketed $10,000 on Vertigo (Billings, Montana; 2000), Justin McBride again who got $30,000 on Rampage (Houston, Texas; 2000), Ross Coleman who racked up $100,000 on Tuff-E-Nuff (Columbus, Ohio; 2001), and Jim Sharp who banked $85,000 on Dillinger (Fort Worth, Texas; 2002).

During the Built Ford Tough Series (BFTS) era, Owen Washburn collected $90,000 on Hammer (Bossier City, Louisiana; 2003), Wiley Petersen netted $20,000 on Ace of Hearts (Billings, Montana; 2003), Cory Melton secured $35,000 on Werewolf (Laughlin, Nevada; 2003), Ednei Caminhas earned $65,000 on Red Alert (Tacoma, Washington; 2004), Justin McBride took $15,000 on Blond Bomber (Albuquerque, New Mexico; 2004), Brendon Clark gained $40,000 on Tombstone (Laughlin, Nevada; 2004), Fabricio Alves cashed $45,000 on Red Alert (Tacoma, Washington; 2005), Kody Lostroh attained $35,000 on Thunder River (Uniondale, New York; 2005), Mike White procured $15,000 on Leroy (Tulsa, Oklahoma; 2005), Justin McBride again bagged $25,000 on Frontier Justice (Tampa, Florida; 2006), Chris Shivers obtained $25,000 on Bo Kat (Reno, Nevada; 2006), Guilherme Marchi captured $90,000 on Scene of the Crash (Greensboro, North Carolina; 2006), and Mike Lee carried off $15,000 on Big Show (Columbus, Ohio; 2006).

The Mossy Oak Shootout was discontinued after 2006.

=== Ford Truck Moment of Truth ===
In this challenge sponsored by Ford Trucks which started in 2001 and lasted through 2009, the average leader going into a BLC/BFTS regular-season event's Championship Round got a chance to win $5,000. If this leading rider won the event, he also won the Ford Truck Moment of Truth bonus money. If the average leader did not win, the prize money increased by $5,000. This repeated until a bull rider was successful. After a rider won the money, the whole pool started over again.

=== Wrangler High Marked Ride ===
Circa 2003, there was a contest where Wrangler Jeans used to reward the rider with the highest marked ride at the majority of BFTS events. If there was a tie, both riders were awarded.

=== Ford Super Duty Challenge ===
From 2005 through 2008, this challenge gave the top 45 bull riders an opportunity to compete for a $1 million bonus. One elite bull rider won a Ford Super Duty pickup truck and one won a $1 million bonus through the achievement of performance milestones. The bull riders competed at seven pre-determined BFTS events. Winners of these events became eligible for incentives. A bull rider who won two or more events became eligible to win the $1 million bonus and had to win the PBR BFTS World Finals event. The bull rider that finished the highest in the event aggregate won the Super Duty truck. Adriano Morães drove away with the 2005 Ford Super Duty.

=== Enterprise Rent-A-Car Ride with the Best Bonus ===
Beginning in 2004, the rider who won the previous BFTS event had a chance to win $5,000 courtesy of Enterprise Rent-A-Car if he successfully covered his bull during the first round of the next BFTS two-day event. If he rode his first round bull, then he had the chance to ride for an additional $5,000 during the second round.

By 2007, the challenge was modified; the rider who won the previous long round at a regular season BFTS event, regardless if it was a two or three-day event, was offered the chance to win $5,000 if he successfully rode his next long-round bull. If the rider failed to make a qualified ride, the money went to the bull's stock contractor(s).

=== Cabela's World's Foremost Ride ===
From 2005 through 2009, Cabela's paid the rider who scored the highest-marked ride at each BFTS regular-season event a $1,000 bonus.

At the PBR World Finals, Cabela's awarded $25,000 to the rider who scored the highest-marked ride of the BFTS regular season. If multiple riders tied for the highest-marked ride, the money was split between them. Cabela's also awarded the riders who scored the second-highest and third-highest marked rides of the BFTS regular season $10,000 and $5,000, respectively. The rider who scored the highest-marked ride of the World Finals was also awarded a $10,000 bonus.

=== Salem NationaLease High Mark Bull Bonus ===
From 2007 through 2009, the High Mark Bull Bonus sponsored by Salem NationaLease was paid to the stock contractor of the bull. The bonus was designated to the bull who received the highest bull score at each BFTS event. The bonus amount was a weekly amount of $1,250. The PBR World Finals were excluded.

=== Zantrex-3 Insta-Shot Grudge Match ===
Beginning in the middle of the 2008 BFTS season, the rider who won the previous event went up against another BFTS rider of his choice at the next event. Each rider would get on a bull selected by the then-PBR Director of Livestock, Cody Lambert at the end of the event's regular first round. The rider who successfully rode his bull or the rider who scored more points if both covered their bulls won $5,000 courtesy of Zantrex-3 Insta-Shot. If neither rider covered his bull, the bounty increased by $5,000 at the next BFTS event. If a rider won the money, the bounty reverted back to $5,000 at the following event. This challenge only lasted from the middle to the end of the 2008 BFTS regular season and points won by riders for eight-second qualified rides did not count towards the world standings.

=== Rocky Mountain Elk Foundation (RMEF) Trophy Bull Challenge ===
In 2009 and 2010, this challenge sponsored by the Rocky Mountain Elk Foundation was added. It was a season long challenge. Cody Lambert selected three bulls from every long round of each BFTS event. If the bull bucked the rider off, the stock contractor received one point. If the rider achieved a successful ride, the rider received a point. The winners of the challenge, the top three riders and stock contractors with the most points received an RMEF outdoor adventure of their choice, which happened at the end of the season.

== Champions and awards ==
The Heroes and Legends Celebration lists the Ring of Honor, Brand of Honor, Sharon Shoulders Award, Jim Shoulders Lifetime Achievement Award, and Ty Murray Top Hand Award. The Ring of Honor for bull riders and Brand of Honor for bulls are equivalent to a hall of fame induction.

== Country bars ==
In 2006, the PBR, in partnership with Cordish, opened a western-themed bar in Kansas City, Missouri, called PBR Cowboy Bar. It eventually became a franchise and expanded to several other locations in the United States throughout the years. The other PBR Cowboy Bar locations are in Arlington, Texas; Atlanta, Georgia; Baltimore, Maryland; Bossier City, Louisiana; Cary, North Carolina; Columbus, Ohio; Greensburg, Pennsylvania; Hampton, Virginia; Louisville, Kentucky; Miami, Florida; Nashville, Tennessee; Norfolk, Virginia; Orlando, Florida; Philadelphia, Pennsylvania; and St. Louis, Missouri.

As of 2026, two locations are also planned in Pompano Beach, Florida and Chicago, Illinois.

== See also ==
- Lists of rodeo performers
- American Bucking Bull
- Bull Riding Hall of Fame
- Professional Rodeo Cowboys Association
- ProRodeo Hall of Fame
- International Professional Rodeo Association
- Bull Riders Only
- Championship Bull Riding
- Women's Professional Rodeo Association
- Canadian Professional Rodeo Association
- 8 Seconds
- Cowboy Up
- The Ride (2010 film)
- The Longest Ride (2015 film)
- Fearless (2016 TV series)
- The Ride (2023 TV series)
- The Last Rodeo
