= Cody Lambert =

American rodeo cowboy

Personal information
- Full name: Cody Lance Lambert
- Born: December 2, 1961 (age 64) Artesia, New Mexico, U.S.
- Height: 5 ft 10 in (178 cm)
- Weight: 185 lb (84 kg)

Sport
- Sport: Rodeo
- Events: Bull riding Saddle bronc riding
- College team: Sul Ross State
- Turned pro: 1980
- Retired: 1996
- Now coaching: Texas Rattlers
Medal record
Professional Rodeo Cowboys Association
Representing Texas
Texas Circuit Finals Rodeo
Gold medal – first place	1981	All-around
Gold medal – first place	1985	All-around
Gold medal – first place	1990	Saddle bronc riding
Gold medal – first place	1991	Saddle bronc riding
National Intercollegiate Rodeo Association
Representing the Sul Ross State Lobos
College National Finals Rodeo
Gold medal – first place	1982 Bozeman	Men's all-around
Bronze medal – third place	1982 Bozeman	Saddle bronc riding
Bronze medal – third place	1982 Bozeman	Bull riding
Southwest Region Rodeo
Gold medal – first place	1980 Alpine	Saddle bronc riding
Gold medal – first place	1980 Alpine	Men's all-around
Gold medal – first place	1981 Alpine	Saddle bronc riding
Gold medal – first place	1982 Alpine	Saddle bronc riding
Gold medal – first place	1982 Alpine	Men's all-around
Gold medal – first place	1983 Alpine	Saddle bronc riding
Gold medal – first place	1983 Alpine	Bull riding
Gold medal – first place	1983 Alpine	Men's all-around

Cody Lance Lambert (born December 2, 1961) is an American former professional rodeo cowboy. He specialized in saddle bronc riding and bull riding. He was also a co-founder and vice president of the Professional Bull Riders (PBR). He created the protective vest that professional bull riders have been required to wear for many years after witnessing the death of his friend Lane Frost at the Cheyenne Frontier Days rodeo in Cheyenne, Wyoming, on July 30, 1989. Since 2022, Lambert has been the head coach of the Texas Rattlers in the PBR Team Series. In 2023, the Rattlers won the PBR Team Series Championship title.

In 2023, Lambert was ranked No. 19 on the list of the top 30 bull riders in PBR history.

== Early and personal life ==
Cody Lambert is the son of racehorse trainer Cliff Lambert, who was the first jockey to win the All American Futurity at Ruidoso Downs aboard Galobar in 1959. Cody has three siblings, brothers Chuck and Casey Lambert, the latter a successful racehorse jockey, and sister Cheyann. Cody lives in Bowie, Texas, on a ranch with his wife, Leanne, and their horses and dogs.

== Contestant career ==
Lambert competed in the Professional Rodeo Cowboys Association (PRCA). He, Lane Frost, Tuff Hedeman, Jim Sharp, and Ty Murray frequently rode the rodeo circuit together and were known as the "Wolfpack" during that time.

Lambert qualified for the PRCA's championship event, the National Finals Rodeo (NFR), 10 times - seven in bull riding (1985–86, 1988–89, 1991–93) and three in saddle bronc (1981, 1990–91), and also qualified for the PBR World Finals three times (1994–96). 1991 was the only year in which he qualified for the NFR in two events simultaneously.

Lambert also competed in the Bull Riders Only (BRO) circuit.

In April 1992, he was one of the 21 co-founders of the Professional Bull Riders (PBR).

Lambert won the PBR's inaugural event, the Tuff Hedeman Challenge in Fort Worth, Texas, in April 1993. He officially retired from bull riding at the end of the 1996 PBR World Finals. While an active rider and also when retired, he served as the PBR's vice president. When retired as a contestant, he also served as a PBR bull riding judge, and as the PBR's livestock director.

== Coaching career ==
In 2022, after retiring as the PBR's Director of Livestock at the conclusion of that year's PBR World Finals in May, Lambert became the head coach of the Texas Rattlers; one of eight bull riding teams in the PBR Teams Series, which debuted that year. The Team Series season runs in the summer and autumn and concludes with the Team Series Championship at T-Mobile Arena in Las Vegas, Nevada. In late September 2022, the Texas Rattlers won the event at Thunder Days in Ridgedale, Missouri; the hometown event of rival team, the Missouri Thunder. Two weeks later, the Rattlers won their own hometown event at Rattler Days in Fort Worth, Texas. The very next weekend, the Rattlers won their third event in a row at Ridge Rider Days in Glendale, Arizona; the hometown event of rival team, the Arizona Ridge Riders. The Rattlers ended up in second place during the regular season. As a result, them and regular-season champions, the Austin Gamblers, received first-round byes and did not compete during the first day of the Team Series Championship. The Rattlers ended up finishing in third place at the conclusion of the inaugural PBR Teams Series Championship.

In September 2023, the Rattlers won Thunder Days for the second year in a row. Later in early October of that year, the Rattlers won their own hometown event at Rattler Days for the second year in a row as well. In late October of that year, after making it through the first two days of the Team Series Championship, the Rattlers succeeded in making it to the final round against the Austin Gamblers. The Rattlers ended up defeating the Gamblers to win the PBR Team Series Championship title.

In 2024, the Texas Rattlers were eliminated after the second day of the Team Series Championship.

In January 2025, the Texas Rattlers defeated the Austin Gamblers to win the PBR Monster Energy Team Challenge presented by Camping World at the Unleash the Beast Series (UTB) event in Houston, Texas. In April of the same year, the Rattlers again defeated the Gamblers to win the Monster Energy Team Challenge at the UTB event in Nampa, Idaho.

The Texas Rattlers finished third in the 2025 PBR Team Series regular season. As a result, they, as well as regular-season champions Florida Freedom and second-place Austin Gamblers received a first-round bye and automatically qualified for the second day of the Team Series Championship. The Freedom and Gamblers were eliminated after the second day, while the Rattlers moved on to the third and final day of the event. The Rattlers ended up finishing in third place at the conclusion of the Team Series Championship.

In January 2026, the Texas Rattlers defeated the Florida Freedom to win the Monster Energy Team Challenge at the UTB event in Tampa, Florida.

The Rattlers finished fifth during the 2026 Team Series regular season. On the first day of the Team Series Championship, they defeated the Kansas City Outlaws to move on to the second day of competition. On the second day, the Rattlers were defeated by the Austin Gamblers, but came back to the Last Chance Game, where they eliminated the Missouri Thunder and Carolina Cowboys to move on to the third and final day of competition. On the third day, the Rattlers were defeated by eventual Championship winners the Nashville Stampede, who became the first PBR team to win a second championship. In the game to see who would finish third, the Rattlers were again defeated by the Austin Gamblers.

== Honors ==
- In 1996, Lambert was one of the inaugural inductees into the PBR Ring of Honor.
- In 2002, he was inducted into the Texas Cowboy Hall of Fame. Inducted for his rodeo accomplishments, the museum features many of Lambert's personal items used during his rodeo career.
- In 2012, he was inducted into the Texas Rodeo Cowboy Hall of Fame.
- In 2020, he was inducted into the National Cowboy & Western Heritage Museum's Rodeo Hall of Fame.
- In 2023, he was inducted into the Bull Riding Hall of Fame. That same year, he was ranked No. 19 on the list of the top 30 bull riders in PBR history. He was also honored as Coach of the Year for the PBR Team Series in 2023.

== In media ==
Lambert's name ended up being used as the character name for Sasha Mitchell's character on the television show Step By Step.

In the Lane Frost biographical drama, 8 Seconds (1994), Lambert was portrayed by Red Mitchell.
