= Jim Sharp (bull rider) =

American bull rider

- Born: James Carroll Sharp; October 6, 1965 (age 60); Kermit, Texas, U.S.
- Education: Kermit High School
- Alma mater: Odessa College
- Occupation: Professional bull rider
- Years active: 1978–2005
- Height: 5 ft 8 in (1.73 m)

James Carroll Sharp (born October 6, 1965) is an American former professional rodeo cowboy who specialized in bull riding. In 1988, he became the first bull rider in the Professional Rodeo Cowboys Association (PRCA)'s National Finals Rodeo history to successfully ride each of his 10 bulls during the champion-crowning event. The record-breaking performance earned Sharp his first of two PRCA World Champion Bull Rider titles. He rode professionally for nearly 20 years, and was a co-founder of the Professional Bull Riders (PBR). He is considered among the most talented bull riders in history.

In 2023, Sharp was ranked No. 3 on the list of the top 30 bull riders in PBR history.

== Early life ==
Jim Sharp, nicknamed "The Razor", was born in Kermit, Texas, to a rodeo family in 1965. He is of British descent. Sharp's father, James Sharp, was a calf roper. Sharp rode his first steer in 1974 at the age of nine in Pecos, Texas, while competing in an American Junior Rodeo Association event.

By the time Sharp was 13 years old, he was riding junior bulls in American Junior Rodeo Association or AJRA rodeos. Sharp was AJRA reserve steer riding champion in the 12 and under class in 1978 and soon thereafter Champion Bull Rider at the AJRA National Finals in the 13–15 age class.

At 16, Sharp was competing in sanctioned high school rodeo events at the National High School Rodeo Association or NHSRA as well as the AJRA events, placing at the top or near the top in many of the competitions. Sharp won his first of four bull riding championship titles in 1981 at the American Junior Rodeo Association and went on to win the Texas High School All-Around title in 1984, his senior year at Kermit High School.

== Career ==
=== College years ===
Odessa College's Wrangler coach, Jim Watkins, recruited Sharp into the Odessa College Rodeo program. He competed on a regular basis at Billy Bob's at the Stockyards in Fort Worth, Texas. The college years in the National Intercollegiate Rodeo Association (NIRA) were also the beginnings of his professional riding career. As a rookie in the PRCA in 1986, he won the Bull Riding and Overall Rookie of the Year titles, as well as the Texas Circuit Bull Riding Rookie of the Year title, and set a new record for most money won in a rookie year ($100,160). He also qualified for his first of seven consecutive trips to the National Finals Rodeo.

=== PRCA championships ===
In 1988, he became the first bull rider to ride all 10 bulls at the National Finals Rodeo. The record-breaking performance earned Sharp his first of two PRCA world titles. The following year, he won the NFR bull riding average for the second consecutive year and in 1990, he won his second world title. His last year to qualify for the NFR was 1992, when he picked up his third bull riding average title.

=== Obstacles and injuries ===
Persistent injuries during the 1993–94 season sidelined Sharp. However, he made a limited comeback in 1995, riding in the Southwestern Livestock and Exposition Show and Rodeo in Fort Worth finishing 2nd in that event. He finished 7th in 1996 and in the top 15 in 1997. In 1998, he finished 48th overall in the Bud Light Cup Series and spent the majority of the year with a dislocated shoulder.

=== Later successes ===
Finishing 31st in the Bud Light Cup (BLC) standings for 1999, Sharp felt his riding career was back on track. He finished third in two events, won the Copenhagen Tough Company event in Poplar Bluff, Missouri, and rode four of five bulls at the 1999 PBR World Finals, which included a 94-point ride in round 2 on the previously unridden bull, Jim Jam.

The 2000 Bud Light Cup season ended for Sharp with a 15th-place ranking, 4,013 Bud Light Cup points and earnings of $74,856 plus solid top five (2nd, 3rd and 5th) finishes in three major events and a championship at the Copenhagen Tough Co. event in Lufkin, Texas. For 2001, Sharp rode to an 11th place ranking and more than $122,000.00 in total winnings. His 2001 season included a win at the Bud Light Cup event in Phoenix, Arizona, his first PBR major-league event win since 1996.

The 2002 season was a resurgent year for Sharp. He had very strong showings at many events, including his namesake event in Odessa, Texas. He also garnered the event championship at the Tuff Hedeman Championship Challenge in Fort Worth as well as the Portland Open in Portland, Oregon, the Jerome Davis Challenge in Greensboro, North Carolina, and Bullnanza-Guthrie in Guthrie, Oklahoma.

In addition to the event title at the Tuff Hedeman Championship Challenge in Fort Worth, Sharp also rode Dillinger for 95.5 points in that event's Mossy Oak Shootout, winning $85,000 in the process for that ride alone. He led the Bud Light Cup standings for most of the year before stumbling in the second half of the year and eventually being surpassed by eventual World Champion Ednei Caminhas. He still finished the 2002 season 4th in the world with $281,315.50 in earnings.

The 2003 Built Ford Tough Series (BFTS) season was a tough ride for Sharp. He did have a few top 10 finishes, including a 5th place finish in Tampa, Florida, a 2nd place finish in St. Louis, Missouri, and an 8th place finish at the Tuff Hedeman Challenge in Fort Worth. But he battled through some injuries along the way, including a complex scalp laceration and bruised ribs in Fort Worth, and a leg injury in Atlantic City, New Jersey. He also pulled out of the World Finals after three rounds due to shoulder trouble. He finished 16th in the world that year with earnings of $56,102.94. Due to shoulder surgery in the off-season, Sharp did not return to competition until late into the 2004 season.

Unable to amass enough points to stay on the BFTS, he was cut from the tour following the BFTS event in Grand Rapids, Michigan, and was unable to qualify for the 2004 PBR World Finals, ultimately finishing 60th in the world with just $11,896.38 won. This would prove to be his last major-league PBR event appearance. After spending much of the 2005 season on the PBR's lower tours, Sharp decided to retire.

== Honors ==
- 1988 Cowboy Capital Walk of Fame
- 2000 Texas Cowboy Hall of Fame
- 2004 Texas Rodeo Hall of Fame
- 2006 ProRodeo Hall of Fame
- 2009 Texas Rodeo Cowboy Hall of Fame
- 2010 PBR Ring of Honor
- 2016 Bull Riding Hall of Fame
- 2023 No. 3 on the list of the top 30 bull riders in PBR history
