= Bud Light Cup Series =

Professional Bull Riders competition

- Most recent season or competition: 2002 BLC season
- Sport: Bull riding
- Founded: 1993; 33 years ago
- First season: 1994
- Last season: 2002
- Folded: December 8, 2002; 23 years ago
- Replaced by: Built Ford Tough Series
- Organizing body: Professional Bull Riders
- Country: United States; Canada
- Headquarters: Irvine, California, U.S. (1994–1995); Colorado Springs, Colorado, U.S. (1995–2002)
- Last champion: Ednei Caminhas (2002)
- Most titles: Adriano Morães (2 titles)
- Broadcasters: TNN (1994–2002); CBS (2002) (Note: CBS only carried the final regular-season event of the 2002 BLC season in Columbus, Ohio.)
- Sponsors: Bud Light (1994–2002); Las Vegas (1996–2002)

The Bud Light Cup Series (BLC) was a professional bull riding tour organized by the Professional Bull Riders (PBR) that acted as the organization's premier series from 1994 to 2002.

== Background ==
This series ran from 1994 through 2002. It was the inaugural and only tour at its time of inception, as the PBR started their inaugural season in 1994. This series became the elite series of the PBR. The entire series was telecast on TNN. Each event used three judges – except for the PBR Bud Light Cup World Championships, which had four – with two typically scoring up to 50 points each, and a reserve judge to provide a tiebreaking score if needed. Two-day events featured two preliminary rounds in which the top 45 bull riders who each rode one bull per night; the top 15 riders by score from these preliminaries rode in a short go-round, called the Built Ford Tough Championship Round in 2002, on the second night. The rider who had the highest score total from his three rides was the event winner. One day events followed the same format but only had one preliminary round.

Riders were drawn for each bull ahead of an event and then posted a few days prior. By 2002, Livestock Director Cody Lambert was working with a minimum of 20 stock contractors in order to have around six contractors featuring approximately 75 bulls at each event. Upon conclusion of the PBR's regular season, the 45 bull riders who had earned the most money in Bud Light Cup Series and Challengers Tour events combined qualified for the PBR Bud Light Cup World Finals in Las Vegas. The Qualifier Standings showed which riders were in the hunt for a berth to the Bud Light Cup World Finals. Once the finalists were at the World Finals, however, the World Champion was determined by Bud Light Cup Points won throughout the season.

The points system was a very thorough one that ensured the most consistent rider of the season was proclaimed the champion. Bud Light Cup points were awarded only at Bud Light Cup events. They were calculated by using the ride score and adding any bonus points for the Standings position in each round and the event overall position. The World Champion Bull Rider title and the gold buckle went to the rider with most Bud Light Cup points.

Bud Light Cup Points Table
Bonus points are awarded for each round		Bonus points are awarded for overall event	
1st place	100 points	1st place	300 points
2nd place	90 points	2nd place	270 points
3rd place	80 points	3rd place	240 points
4th place	70 points	4th place	210 points
5th place	60 points	5th place	180 points
6th place	50 points	6th place	150 points
7th place	40 points	7th place	120 points
8th place	30 points	8th place	90 points
9th place	20 points	9th place	60 points
10th place	10 points	10th place	30 points

== Inaugural season (1994) ==
After a small series of PBR-sanctioned events televised on The Nashville Network (TNN) with Bud Light as the primary sponsor took place in 1993, the organization had its first official season with a year-end world finals event in 1994, with TNN remaining its official television partner. There were eight regular season events, as well as the World Finals. The world championship race was based on points won throughout the season. The regular-season stops ranged from one-day to three-day events. There were 30 contestants in each stop. All would ride in the regular long rounds, then the top 15 riders with the highest combined scores returned to the Championship Round.

The inaugural PBR World Finals took place at Las Vegas, Nevada's MGM Grand Garden Arena. There were 46 contestants at the two-day event. All would ride in Rounds 1 and 2, then the top fifteen point-earners competed in the Championship Round. Throughout the years, more events were added to the PBR schedule.

== 1995 season changes ==
The 1995 season was the first and only one in which the world championship race was based entirely on money won throughout the season. This was also the year that the PBR's first minor league tour, the Touring Pro Division was introduced, making the televised Bud Light Cup Series the PBR's elite series.

There were now 30 contestants at the World Finals: the top 20 money-earners from the Bud Light Cup Series, as well as the top 10 money-earners from the Touring Pro Division. It was a six-round event where all contestants rode in the first five rounds, then the top fifteen point-earners rode in the Championship Round.

== 1996 season changes ==
Starting in 1996, the PBR reduced the maximum number of go-rounds in an event from four to three (meaning now, two long rounds and the Championship Round). Also, the number of riders on the BLC series increased from 30 to 45, and the top 45 money-earners based on money won at all PBR-sanctioned events would qualify for the World Finals. Also, the world championship race returned to a point system.

Beginning with the 1996 World Finals, the city of Las Vegas was the tour's presenting sponsor, thus it was now officially known as the Bud Light Cup presented by Las Vegas.

The World Finals was now a five-round event where all contestants rode in the first four rounds, then the top fifteen returned for the Championship Round.

This was the first season where a million dollars in total prize money would be offered at the World Finals.

== 1997 season changes ==
Starting with the BLC event in Billings, Montana, the PBR adopted a half-point scoring system in their events (whereas in prior seasons they scored rides in whole points), a change that would remain in place until the end of the 2005 Built Ford Tough Series season (when a quarter-point system would be implemented full-time).

== 1999 season changes ==
After five years at the MGM Grand Garden Arena, the PBR World Finals moved to Las Vegas' Thomas and Mack Center.

== 2000 season changes ==
A new rule was put in place, called the "World Champion's Exemption", where former PBR world champions could compete in as many or as few elite series events as they chose (while still needing to qualify for the World Finals by earning enough money like all other riders).

TNN's name was changed from The Nashville Network to the National Network late in the BLC season.

== 2002 season changes ==
In late 2001, The National Network was rebranded as The New TNN, and the BLC was televised on said channel for its entire 2002 season, with the exception of the last regular-season BLC event in Columbus, Ohio, which was broadcast on CBS. It was the only event in the history of the Bud Light Cup Series to have not been televised on TNN.

Following the 2002 World Finals, the PBR moved its primary telecasts to the Outdoor Life Network (OLN) and the Bud Light Cup Series was rebranded as the Built Ford Tough Series.
