= National Cowgirl Museum and Hall of Fame =

Hall of Fame for Cowgirls

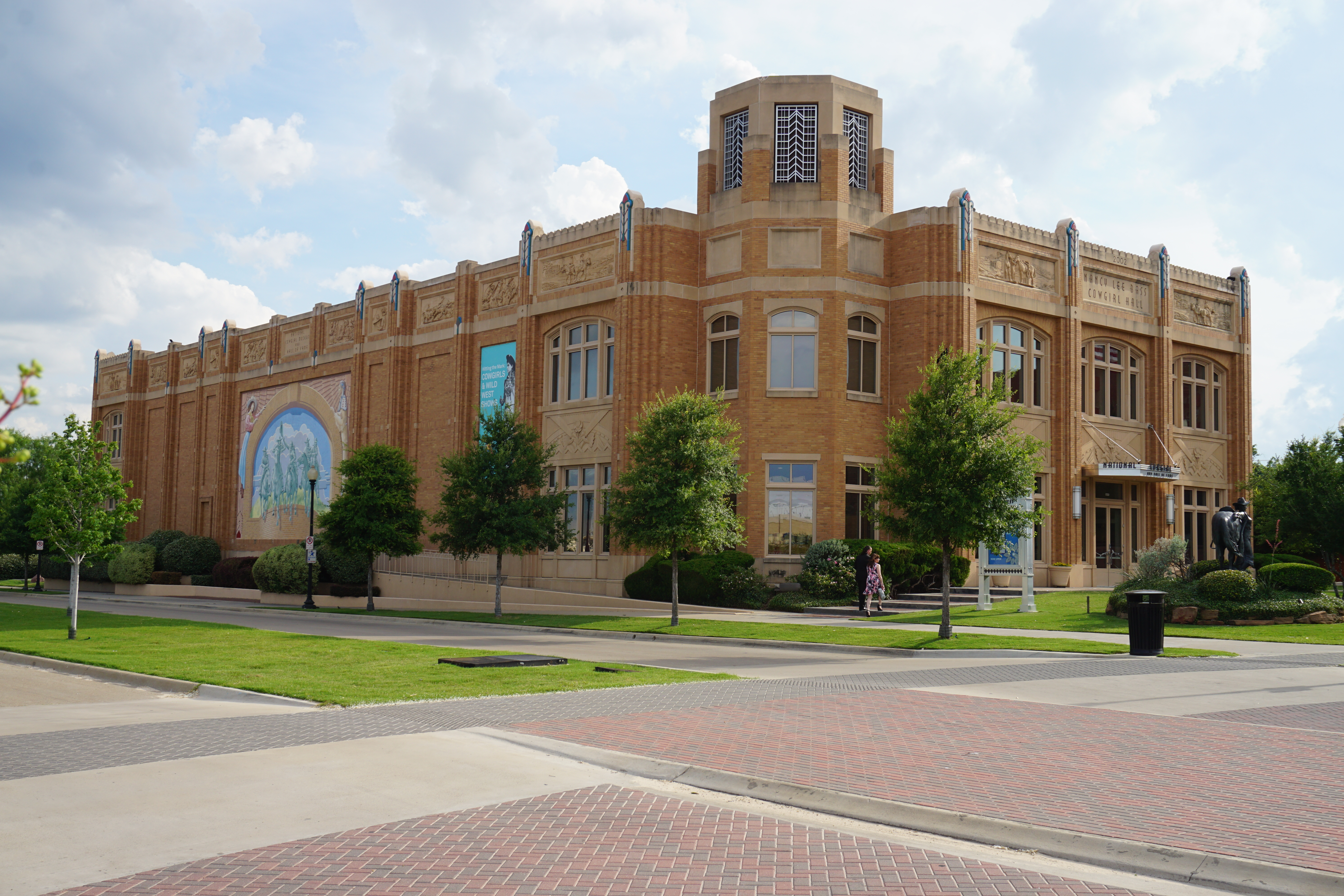
- National Cowgirl Museum and Hall of Fame in Fort Worth, Texas
- Established: 1975
- Location: 1720 Gendy Street, Fort Worth, TX 76107
- Coordinates: 32°44′36″N 97°22′9″W
- Type: Hall of fame
- Website: www.cowgirl.net

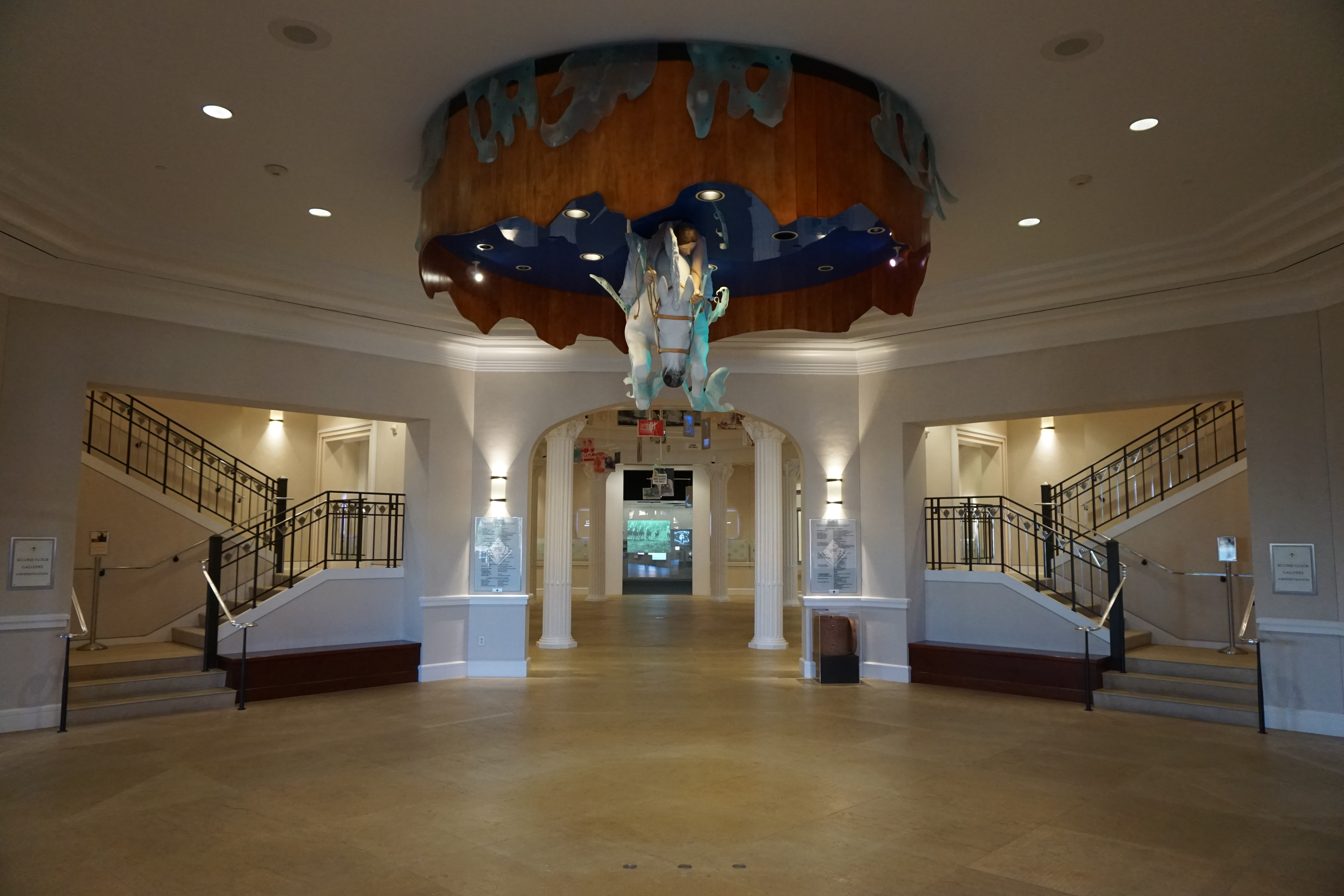
Interior of the National Cowgirl Museum and Hall of Fame

The National Cowgirl Museum and Hall of Fame is located in Fort Worth, Texas, United States. Established in 1975, it is dedicated to honoring women of the American West who have displayed extraordinary courage and pioneering fortitude. The museum is an educational resource with exhibits, a research library, and rare photography collection. It adds honorees to its hall of fame annually.

== Background ==
The National Cowgirl Museum and Hall of Fame honors and documents the lives of women of the American West. The museum was started in 1975 in the basement of the Deaf Smith County Library in Hereford. It was removed to Fort Worth in 1994. The museum then moved into its 33,000 square feet (3,100 m^{2}) permanent location in the Cultural District of Fort Worth on June 9, 2002.

As of 2013, there are over 200 Cowgirl Hall of Fame honorees, with additional women being added annually. Honorees include women from a variety of fields, including pioneers, artists, businesswomen, educators, ranchers and rodeo cowgirls. Women already in the hall of fame include Georgia O'Keeffe, Sacagawea, Annie Oakley, Dale Evans, Enid Justin, Temple Grandin and Sandra Day O’Connor.

== Construction and design ==
Groundbreaking took place on February 22, 2001. The 33,000 square foot building was designed by the Driehaus Prize winner David M. Schwarz/Architectural Services, Inc. Linbeck Construction Company built the structure and Sundance Projects Group, provided project management. Additional members of the construction/design team included: Gideon/Toal Architects, architect of record; Datum Engineers, structural engineers; and Summit Engineering, mechanical engineering.

There was a threefold goal in its design: to relate the building to the historic context of the site, to create a vibrant new space as the home for the National Cowgirl Museum and Hall of Fame, and to provide expansion possibilities for the Museum as its collections grow. The building's location was part of the Western Heritage Plaza to be formed by the National Cowgirl Museum and Hall of Fame, the Cattle Raisers Museum and the Fort Worth Museum of Science and History. The style of the building is compatible with the nearby Will Rogers Memorial Center. The exterior is constructed with brick and cast stone with Terracotta finials formed in a ‘wild rose’ motif and glazed in vibrant colors. A large painted mural by Richard Haas, bas-relief sculpture panels, and a series of hand-carved cast relief panels show scenes related to the Cowgirl's story and depict thematic messages such as ‘East Meets West’ and ‘Saddle Your Own Horse’ that represent the story told inside the Museum.

The Museum's interior is designed to provide a clear circulation path for visitors and creates central spaces for after-hours functions. In addition to administrative offices, the building also includes three gallery areas, a multipurpose theater, hands-on children's areas, a flexible exhibit space, research library, catering area, and a retail store. A 45–foot-high domed rotunda serves as an orienting point and houses the Hall of Fame honoree exhibits. Two grand staircases providing overlooks into the rotunda are made of different metal finishes and colors with art deco inspired ornamental railings. The floors are a honed Corton Bressandes French limestone on the ground floor. Doors of stained walnut mark the entrance to the theater. Western themes are found throughout including native flowers, horse heads and the wild rose motif. The current interior was designed by Projectiles architects.

== Exhibits ==
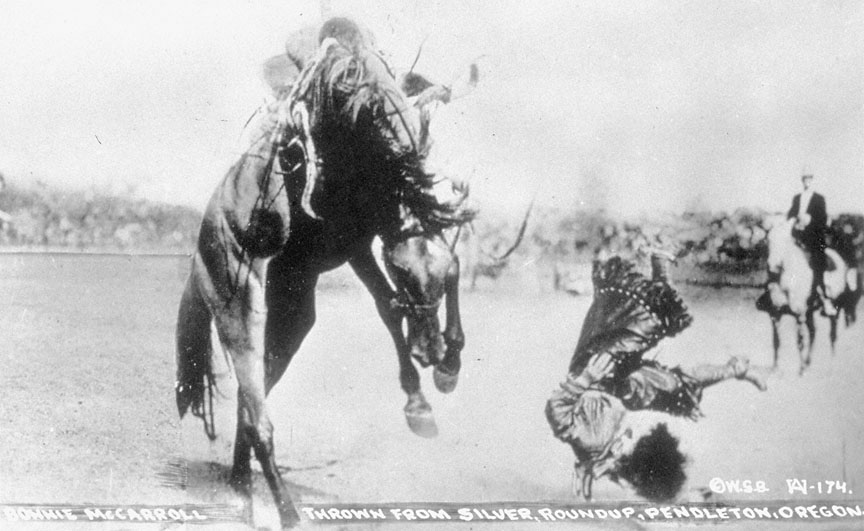
A 1915 photograph by Walter S. Bowman, of Bonnie McCarroll being thrown from a horse named Silver at the Pendleton Round-Up (Part of the National Cowgirl Museum and Hall of Fame photography collection)

The areas of the museum include the Spirit of the Cowgirl Theater, the Lifetiles murals, the children's Discovery Corral, the retail Cowgirl Shop, and a large Rotating Exhibit Gallery. Permanent galleries include:

- The Hall of Fame Honoree Gallery features one honoree from each of the Hall of Fame categories: Champions and Competitive Performers, Ranchers (Stewards of Land and Livestock), Entertainers, Artists and Writers, and Trailblazers and Pioneers
- "Into the Arena," which covers women in the fields of rodeo and trick riding, as well as modern horsewomen of note such as Belmont Stakes winning jockey Julie Krone. It has interactive computer displays, rodeo memorabilia, clothing, and other rodeo artifacts. The area also displays saddles such as Sheila Welch's cutting horse saddle, and Julie Krone's racing saddle. Rodeo fashions are displayed in “Arena Style,” where a rotating rack moves in direct response to a flat-panel, touch-screen display placed in front of the case featuring details and additional information about various outfits, threading together a rodeo star's story with her corresponding clothing. Also in this gallery is an interactive bronc riding experience, where visitors can ride a fake horse that has been modified from training bulls used by rodeo riders. Visitor's "rides" can be videoed, and then sped up, and transformed into footage from an old-style rodeo for purchase.
- "Kinship with the Land," which includes exhibits related to ranching, including historic gear including saddles, women's clothing such as split skirts, pistols, a Victorian riding habit and a sidesaddle. It has both graphic panels and plasma screen displays. An interactive exhibit allows children to saddle a model Shetland pony, and other displays for children, show children's chaps, 4-H ribbons and a selection of toys.
- "Claiming the Spotlight" shows the cowgirl as represented in media, and the varying roles the archetypical cowgirl has played in film, television, advertising and music. The gallery includes a collection of dime novels, displays on entertainers who have portrayed cowgirls such as Barbara Stanwyck, Dale Evans, and Patsy Montana. The gallery includes an old-time theater with a looping film narrated by Katharine Ross about portrayals of cowgirls in mass media, a television area featuring clips from 1950s era series, and jukeboxes playing music by country and western women performers. Interactive exhibits allow Visitors to pose for a movie poster and purchase the ensuing image at the gift shop.

The Rotating Exhibit Gallery has hosted past exhibits including: Donna Howell-Sickles: The Timeless Image of the Cowgirl; Georgia O'Keeffe and the Faraway: Nature and Image; Going to Texas: Five Centuries of Texas Maps; Paniolo: Cowboys and Cowgirls of the Hawaiian Frontier; Photographing Montana 1894-1928: The World of Evelyn Cameron; Ride: A Global Adventure; Texas Flags; The Cowgirl Who Became A Justice: Sandra Day O'Connor, Hard Twist: Western Ranch Women - Photographs by Barbara Van Cleve and No Glitz, No Glory.

== Hall of Fame honorees ==
The following people have been honored:

- Betty Kruse Accomazzo (1983)
- Anna Lee Aldred (1983)
- Mayisha Akbar (2019)
- Tillie Baldwin (2000)
- Eve Ball (1982)
- Mary Ellen (Dude) Barton (1984)
- "Texas Rose" Bascom (1981)
- Kathryn Binford (1976)
- Nancy Binford (1979)
- Faye Blackstone (1982)
- Reba Perry Blakely (1979)
- Bertha Blancett (1999)
- Faye Blesing (1978)
- Eulalia (Sister) Bourne (1996)
- Minnie Lou Bradley (2006)
- Kalyn Brooks (2007)
- Clara Brown (1997)
- Lindy Burch (1997)
- Mary Burger (2017)
- Mamie Sypert Burns (1981)
- Polly Burson (2002)
- Wanda Harper Bush (1978)
- Sarah "Sally" Buxkemper (2011)
- Elsa Spear Byron (1990)
- Sherry Wolfenbarger Cagan (2022)
- Ann Lowdon Call (2005)
- Sharon Camarillo (2006)
- Evelyn Cameron (2001)
- Nellie Cashman (2007)
- Jean Cates (2014)
- Willa Cather (1986)
- Sherry Cervi (2018)
- Pop Chalee (2021)
- Mildred Douglas Chrisman (1988)
- Bebe Mills Clements (1984)
- Patsy Cline (1994)
- Margaret (Peg) Coe (1982)
- Sandy Collier (2011)
- Ashley Collins (2017)
- Mary Jane Colter (2009)
- Nel Sweeten Cooper (1984)
- Gene Krieg Creed (1982)
- Sue Cunningham (2014)
- Kathy Daughn (2002)
- Gail Davis (2004)
- Linda Mitchell Davis (1995)
- Wantha Davis (2004)
- Bernice Dean (1986)
- Angie Debo (1985)
- Margaret McGinley Dickens (2017)
- Grace Ingalls Dow (1984)
- Jewel Frost Duncan (1976)
- Betty Dusek (2010)
- Gretel Ehrlich (2022)
- Dale Evans (1995)
- Mildred Farris (2012)
- Thena Mae Farr (1985)
- Deborah Copenhaver Fellows (2009)
- Francis (Flaxie) Fletcher (1983)
- Margaret Formby (1994)
- Terry Stuart Forst (2007)
- Rose Cambra Freitas (2006)
- Kay Gay (2010)
- Marie Gibson (2011)
- Laura Gilpin (1987)
- Ruby Gobble (1982)
- Glenna Goodacre (2003)
- Mary Ann (Molly) Goodnight (1991)
- Veryl Goodnight (2016)
- Temple Grandin (2010)
- Eleanor Green (2013)
- Marie Keen Gress (1997)
- Audrey O'Brien Griffin (2008)
- Connie Griffith (2004)
- Helen Kleberg Groves (1998)
- Lari Dee Guy (2021)
- Mamie Francis Hafley (1981)
- Sunny Hale (2012)
- Ann Secrest Hanson (2003)
- Margaret Pease Harper (1981)
- Pamela Harr (1981)
- Bonnie Gray Harris (1981)
- Marilyn Williams Harris (2016)
- Margie Roberts Hart (1987)
- Prairie Rose Henderson (2008)
- Alice Adams Holden (1983)
- Juanita Hackett Howell (1986)
- Donna Howell-Sickles (2007)
- Stella Cox Hughes (1988)
- Sabra Lee Humphrey (1981)
- Vaughn Krieg Huskey (1989)
- Margie Greenough Henson (1978)
- Caroline Lake Quiner Ingalls (1984)
- Mary Ingalls (1984)
- Charmayne James (1992)
- Shirley Lucas Jauregui (2014)
- Velma Bronn Johnston (2008)
- Jonnie Jonckowski (1991)
- Suzanne Norton Jones (1999)
- Martha Josey (1985)
- Enid Justin (1978)
- Frances Rosenthal Kallison (2016)
- Frances Kavanaugh (2014)
- Patricia E. Kelly (2015)
- Kathy Kennedy (1984)
- Arlene Kensinger (2002)
- Henrietta King (1982)
- Sheila Kirkpatrick (1992)
- Janell Kleberg (2019)
- Bobby Brooks Kramer (2000)
- Elaine Kramer (2005)
- Lavonna "Shorty" Koger (2021)
- Julie Krone (1999)
- Kathyrn Kusner (2021)
- Florence LaDue (2001)
- Miranda Lambert (2021)
- Rose Wilder Lane (1984)
- Mary Lou LeCompte (2011)
- Harriet (Bita) Lee (1996)
- Nita Brooks Lewallen (1997)
- Ann Lewis (1981)
- Mary Emma Manning Lillie "May Lillie" (2011)
- Rebecca Tyler Lockhart (2000)
- Tad Lucas (1978)
- Louise Massey Mabie (1982)
- Goldia Malone (1981)
- Wilma Mankiller (1994)
- Anne Windfohr Marion (2005)
- Anna Mebus Martin (2011)
- Maria Martinez (1998)
- Sallie Reynolds Matthews (1982)
- Gertrude Maxwell (1993)
- Billie McBride (1981)
- Bonnie McCarroll (2006)
- Reba McEntire (2017)
- Jacqueline Smith McEntire (2017)
- Vera McGinnis (1979)
- Caroline Lockhart (2018)
- Stacie Dieb McDavid (2019)
- Bernice Walsh McLaughlin (1977)
- Marlene Eddleman McRae (1995)
- Sherri Mell (2004)
- Augusta Metcalfe (1983)
- Mary Jo Milner (2004)
- Pam Minick (2000)
- Lilla Day Monroe (1982)
- Patsy Montana (1987)
- Esther Hobart Morris (2006)
- Dixie Reger Mosley (1982)
- Shelly Burmeister Mowery (1990)
- Terri Kelly Moyers (2015)
- Lucille Mulhall (1977)
- Jimmie Gibbs Munroe (1992)
- Camilla Naprous (2018)
- Pauline Nesbitt (2011)
- Mattie Goff Newcombe (1994)
- Sandra Day O'Connor (2002)
- Georgia O'Keeffe (1991)
- Annie Oakley (1984)
- Alice Greenough Orr (1975)
- Pat North Ommert (2016)
- Ollie Osborn (1982)
- May Owen (2014)
- Margaret Owens (1976)
- Mother Joseph Pariseau (1981)
- Cynthia Ann Parker (1998)
- Mary Parks (1979)
- Lulu Bell Parr (2005)
- Jane Pattie (2015)
- Hildred Goodwine Phillips (1989)
- Sue Pirtle (1981)
- Wilma Powell (2008)
- Florence Hughes Randolph (1994)
- Betty Gayle Cooper Ratliff (1987)
- Heidi Redd (2022)
- Connie Douglas Reeves (1997)
- Lucyle Richards (1987)
- Mitzi Lucas Riley (1996)
- Cornelia Wadsworth Ritchie (2009)
- Joyce Gibson Roach (2010)
- Gladys Roldan-de-Moras (2023)
- Carol Rose (2001)
- Ruth Roach (1989)
- Sacagawea (1976)
- Gretchen Sammis (1986)
- Norma Sanders (1989)
- Mari Sandoz (1988)
- Dorothy Satterfield (1993)
- Dessie Sawyer (1981)
- Fern Sawyer (1976)
- Diane Scalese (2018)
- Barbra Schulte (2012)
- Doris Seibold (1985)
- Louise Serpa (1999)
- Mike Reid Settle (1977)
- Christina Alvarado Shanahan (2019)
- Reine Hafley Shelton (1983)
- Nancy Sheppard (1991)
- Lorraine Shoultz (1981)
- Georgie Sicking (1989)
- Blanche Altizer Smith (1976)
- Cathy A. Smith (2013)
- Elizabeth Boyle Smith (1988)
- Jo Ann Smith (2015)
- Velda Tindall Smith (2003)
- Betty Sims Solt (1990)
- Beverly Sparrowk (2008)
- Agnes Wright Spring (1983)
- Rhonda Sedgwick Stearns (1977)
- Fannie Sperry Steele (1978)
- Mollie Taylor Stevenson Jr. (2001)
- Mollie Taylor Stevenson, Sr. (2001)
- Hallie C. Stillwell (1992)
- Anne Stradling (1987)
- Carrie Ingalls Swanzey (1984)
- Anne Burnett Tandy (2002)
- Wilma Standard Tate (1985)
- Jerry Ann Portwood Taylor (1986)
- Ruth Thompson (1990)
- Elenor (Sissy) Thurman (1975)
- Angelika Trabert (2018)
- Marie Tyler (1988)
- Barbara Van Cleve (1995)
- Alice Van-Springsteen (1998)
- Sheila Varian (2003)
- Hope Varner (1988)
- Karen Vold (1978)
- Kirsten Vold (2022)
- Dora Waldrop (1979)
- Cindy Walker (1998)
- Mary Walker (2013)
- Hortense Sparks Ward (2010)
- Ruth Parton Webster (1988)
- Joan Wells (1989)
- Mary Nan West (1998)
- Stacy Westfall (2012)
- Vivian White (1985)
- Narcissa Whitman (1979)
- Laura Ingalls Wilder (1984)
- Eleanor McClintock Williams (1986)
- Ernestine Chesser Williams (1983)
- Lizzie E. Johnson Williams (2013)
- Eloise "Fox Hastings" Wilson (2011)
- Laura Wilson (2019)
- Nancy Bragg Witmer (1997)
- Mabel Strickland Woodward (1992)
- Sydna Yokley Woodyard (1977)
- Jackie Worthington (1975)
- Nellie Snyder Yost (1992)
- Isora DeRacy Young (1979)
- Kay Whittaker Young (2009)
- Florence Youree (1996)
- Jan Youren (1993)

== See also ==
- List of museums in North Texas
