= Lucyle Richards =

American rodeo cowgirl

Lucyle Richards (1909 – March 3, 1995) was a champion bronc rider and a 1987 National Cowgirl Museum and Hall of Fame inductee.

== Life ==
Richards was born in Talihina, Oklahoma, in 1909. She was raised on the family ranch. She started performing at age 13. The press often referred to her as the "prettiest and best-dressed cowgirl in America". She married 17 times to 17 admirers.

== Career ==
Richards was married for a while to Oklahoma Curly Roberts. In 1929, she became a rodeo star in Colonel W. T. Johnson's 1929 Dallas Rodeo in trick roping and bronc riding. Her husband, Oklahoma Curly Roberts performed in the Dallas Rodeo with her. She was known professionally at this time as Lucyle Roberts. The trade papers followed both of their activities during this period and described them frequently. In 1933, the two parted company, and went on to pursue other activities separately.

In 1930, Chicago, she won the bronc riding competition. In 1934, in Boston, she won the all-around and bronc riding. Also in 1934, she competed in Tex Austin's London rodeo. After a while, she, Alice Greenough, and Pauline Nesbitt competed in the Wild Australian Stampede in Melbourne, Australia.

== Career ==
Richards traveled the country performing in rodeos as a bronc rider. In 1939, she owned and operated her own plane in order to perform acrobatic flying. Richards was a member of Colonel W.T. Johnson's Dallas Rodeo. She performed in the trick riding and bronc riding. In 1930 she won the World Champion Saddle Bronc riding in Chicago. She performed in many more rodeos. In 1941 she was arrested and charged with murder. There was a trial to determine if she murdered her intended fourth husband, Frank Y. Dew. She pled self-defense, and the jury found her not guilty after 21 hours of deliberation. In 1951, she won her last championship at 42 years of age in saddle bronc riding in the Girls Rodeo Association (GRA). In 1960, she retired at 60 years of age to become a policewoman in Yoakum, Texas. Richards died on March 3, 1995.
