= Frances Rosenthal Kallison =

American rancher, historian and philanthropist

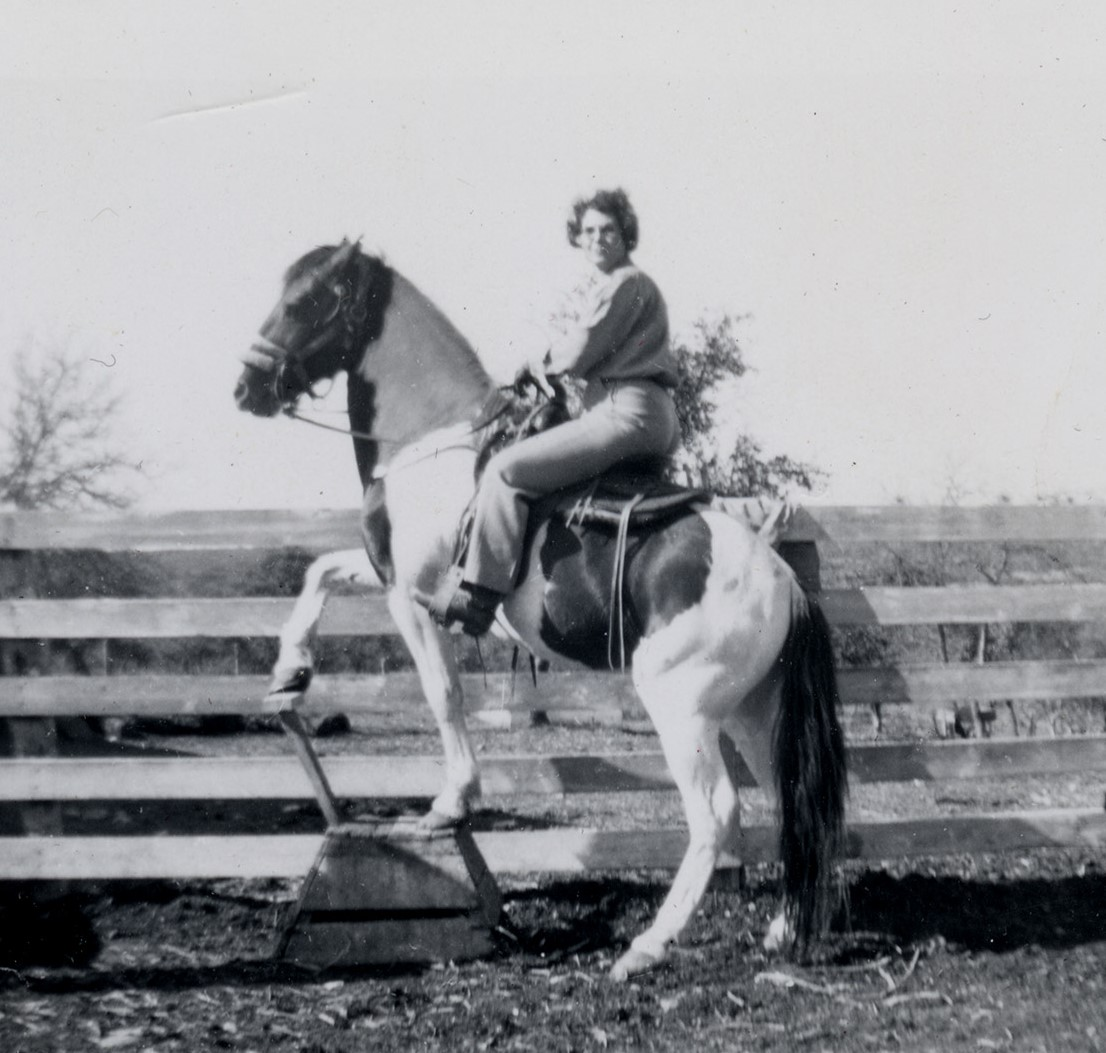
Frances Kallison mounted on her horse Bill practicing trick riding, circa 1943

Frances Elaine Rosenthal Kallison (November 29, 1908 - December 30, 2004) was a pioneering American rancher, historian, and philanthropist. In 2016, she became the first Jewish woman inducted into the National Cowgirl Hall of Fame in recognition of her courage, resilience and independence.

== Biography ==
Kallison was born November 29, 1908, in Fort Worth, Texas, a second-generation Texan and the only child of Mose A. Rosenthal and Mary Neumegen. Kallison briefly attended Vassar College before transferring to the University of Chicago, where she received a bachelor's degree in economics in 1929, shortly before the stock market crash in October that year. Kallison returned to Texas, where she met Perry Kallison (b. 1903, d. 1999); they married on March 8, 1931, and settled in San Antonio. The couple had three children. Frances Kallison died in San Antonio, Texas, on December 30, 2004.

== Work ==
For much of her life, Kallison worked alongside her husband and his family managing the family enterprises, including the largest farm and ranch supply store in the Southwest, and a ranch that bred prize-winning Hereford cattle, Angora goats, and sheep. Most of the ranch became part of Government Canyon State Natural Area in 2002.

During the Great Depression, Kallison led the National Council of Jewish Women to lobby the city of San Antonio to open a maternity ward at the public hospital, as well as a well-baby clinic and prenatal clinic. She also worked for the repeal of Texas's poll tax.

After World War II, Kallison was among the founders of the Ladies' Auxiliary to the Bexar County Sheriff's Mounted Posse, a precision riding team that regularly performed at parades and expositions and at hospitals and orphanages. In 1948 she served as captain of the posse. The Mounted Posse appeared on-screen in Two Guys from Texas (1948), Rio Grande (1950), and in an episode of The Cisco Kid. Funds raised went to the public hospital and other charities.

Kallison was a long-time supporter of the arts, from small artists' projects to serving as a trustee of the San Antonio Museum Association and the Witte Museum.

In her late 60s, Kallison's long-time interest in Jewish history motivated her to return to school. She received a master's degree from Trinity University in San Antonio. In 1979, she helped establish the Texas Jewish Historical Society. She has been called "the acknowledged authority on the history of the Jews of San Antonio."
