= Karen Vold =

American trick rider (1939–2026)

Karen Virginia Vold (née Womack; May 11, 1939 – January 12, 2026) was an American trick rider who was inducted into the National Cowgirl Museum and Hall of Fame in 1978.

== Background ==
Karen Virginia Womack was born in Phoenix, Arizona, on May 11, 1939. She was the daughter of ProRodeo Hall of Fame rodeo clown Andy Womack.

Vold's family owned a riding stable just north of Phoenix. She would guide visitors riding out in the desert. One of the ladies who worked in the stable owned a Palomino and a trick riding saddle. Vold learned her first three tricks from her. Vold's parents divorced when she was 8 years old. Her parents bought her a horse and saddle to help deal with the situation. She was about 10 years old, and she practiced trick riding on that horse. Her father ended up having to leave to rodeo as a clown for six years due to the death of rodeo clown Jasbo Fulkerson. Vold said "When he came back and saw how serious I was about trick riding, he sent me to Colorado to take lessons from world champion trick rider Dick Griffith."

After she turned 10 years old, she began learning trick riding. Vold competed in her first professional rodeo when she was 14 years old. She married Harry Vold in 1972; she was his second wife. They had one daughter, Kirsten, who runs the ranch now.

Vold died on January 12, 2026, at the age of 86.

== Career ==
Vold was a performing trick rider for 17 years. She assisted in forming "The Flying Cimarrons", which brought the event back into the spotlight for many years. The formation of teams for trick riding was also innovative and enhanced the process of hiring riders. When Vold got married, she retired from performing. However, she still was involved in the sport through coaching and clinics. Then she helped run the ranch she owned with her hall of fame husband, Harry until his death in 2017. For 28 years she taught trick riding with one of her former students, Linda. They opened the Red Top Ranch Trick Riding School in Avondale near her ranch, about 20 miles from Pueblo, Colorado.

=== Honors ===
- 1978 National Cowgirl Museum and Hall of Fame
- 1992 Tad Lucas Award - National Cowboy & Western Heritage Museum
- 2016 Donita Barnes Award
