= Connie Griffith =

American trick rider

- Occupation: Rodeo competitor
- Discipline: Trick riding
- Born: March 9, 1942
- Died: August 15, 1998 (aged 56)

Honors
- National Cowgirl Hall of Fame

Connie Griffith (March 9, 1942 – August 15, 1998) is a 2004 National Cowgirl Museum and Hall of Fame inductee. Griffith was known for her trick riding ability.

== Life ==
Connie Griffith was born Connie Rosenberger on March 9, 1942, in Nebraska.

At age 4, she received a Shetland pony named Nellie from her father. When Griffith was a child, nearly every day she would ride her horses Toby and Nix. In her teenage years she was in a horse club. Then in her late teenage years, she competed in rodeos.

Griffith attended the Denver Stock Show, and she became moved by the trick riding show she watched. It had featured many of the best performers, including trick rider Dick Griffith. On her 12th birthday, her father gave her a used Porter trick riding saddle. He also promised her trick riding lessons with Dick Griffith. The lessons occurred soon after that. Dick said she was "a natural". The 95 pound student had all the attributes for a successful trick rider. At 17, she became the Nebraska High School Rodeo Queen. Also at that age, she was recognized by Nebraska as the "state's most superb horsewoman". She was the valedictorian of her high school in Hemingford, Nebraska.

Griffith attended Colorado State University while still taking trick riding lessons from Dick. Although there was a significant age difference, they were in love so they got married. Dick was a future ProRodeo Hall of Fame bull rider.

== Career ==
Griffith performed at major rodeos and horse exhibitions around the country. She even performed at Madison Square Garden in New York City. Then while raising their son Tad, she and Dick instructed students at their own trick riding school. She taught many famous female trick riders. She also trained over 100 trick horses.

Two of Griffith's signature tricks were the Tad Elder Suicide Drag and the Under the Belly tricks. Griffith is the only women to perform the Tad Elder Suicide Drag in her act. She also performed the Under the Belly trick more times than any other trick rider. She was creative in making up new tricks. She was a skilled Roman Rider as well. Griffith spent 40 years as a trick rider.

She and her son, Tad, brought trick riding to Las Vegas, Nevada. For eight years, they displayed their talents at the Excalibur Hotel.They performed in the King Arthur's Tournament, where Griffith performed for six years in over 6,000 performances.

== Death and legacy ==
Griffith died on August 15, 1998, at 56 years old. Dick preceded her in death on August 10, 1984. When Griffith was trick riding at a rodeo, she had an accident. Her horse Winnie stumbled while she was moving from the horse's neck to another position. Winnie somersaulted, and Connie was crushed under her.

The Griffith family has been trick riding from the early 1900s, passing the torch forward ever since. Griffiths' son Tad is a third generation trick rider who is teaching his children all of the tricks that his parents taught him.

"Do it with style and a smile" was always Griffith's motto.
