= Mamie Francis Hafley =

Equestrian performer

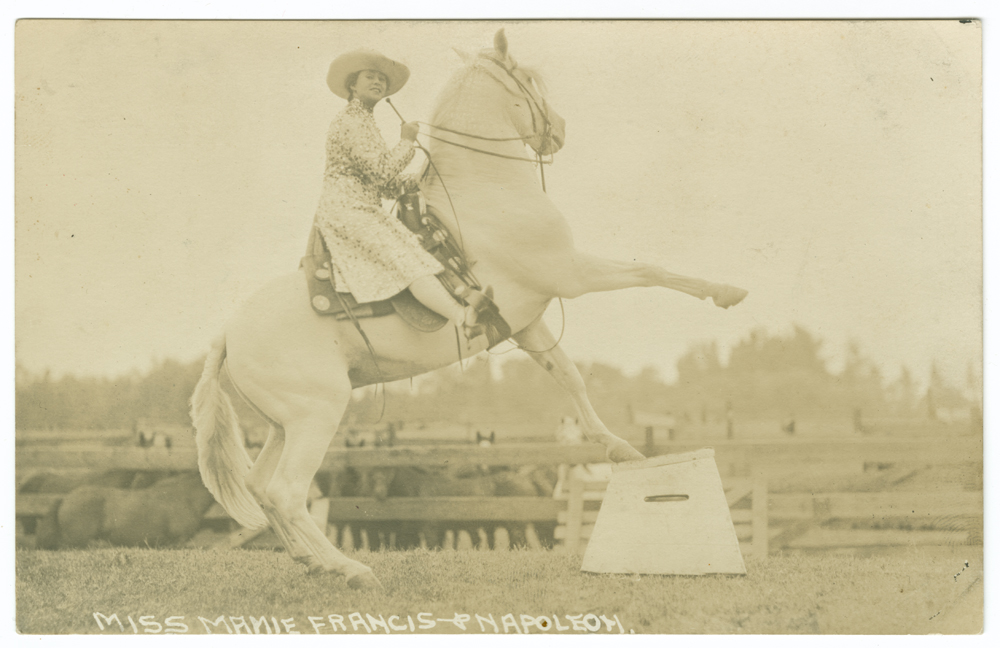
Mamie Francis and Napoleon, ca. 1915-1922.

Mamie Francis Hafley (1885–1950), born Elba Mae Ghent, was a performer in Wild West shows and rodeos from about 1901 until 1940. She was famous for her daring horse-diving act that involved jumping off a 50-foot tower into a pool of water, for her sharpshooting ability from the back of a galloping horse, and for her high school horse-riding acts.

== Early life and family ==
Elba Mae Ghent or "Mamie Francis" was the youngest child of Charles Edgar Ghent (1854–1909?) and Hannah Street Ghent (1853–1909?) who had married 26 September 1875 in Gratiot, Wisconsin. Her father had come to America as an infant with his parents, Henry and Henriet Ghent (commonly spelled "Gent"), on 16 September 1854 from the port of Liverpool, England. Mamie's mother, Hannah (or "Anna"), the daughter of Samuel Street of New Jersey and his wife, Elizabeth Armstrong, of New York, was a young child when her family moved to Wisconsin (before 1857).

After they married, Charles Edgar and Anna Street Ghent moved to Nora, Illinois, where their children Charles H. Ghent (1876-?), Elizabeth B. Ghent Colt (1877–1902), and Elba Mae Ghent (1885–1950) were born. Wisconsin christening records show that the Ghents had to move back to Wisconsin shortly after Elba was born. Both of her siblings died as relatively young adults: Charles to an accidental shooting (witnessed by family) and Elizabeth (wife of Alfred Winston Colt) of unknown causes only three months after giving birth to a daughter, Bessie "Betty" Maretta Colt (1 September 1902). Elba's parents may have divorced or separated prior to the 1900 census. In Janesville, Wisconsin, 15-year-old Elba was living with her mother, Anna Street, who was working as a housekeeper for a farmer named Edmund Jaynes. Also in 1900, there was a "single" man (likely Elba's father) named "Charles E. Gent" living with his mother, H. Campbell in Burlington, Iowa. By 1905, "Charles E. Gent" was a "widower" living in Des Moines, Iowa.

When Pawnee Bill's Historical Wild West Indian Museum and Encampment Show came to town in the early 1900s, Elba Mae Ghent joined the show, starting her performing career that spanned over four decades (1901–1940). As "Mamie Francis," she became known for her courage, skill, and beauty, entertaining untold numbers of Americans during the heyday of the Wild West shows and rodeos of the early 20th century.

== Wild West shows ==
What began in the mid-1830s with George Catlin's western art and lectures educating audiences about Indians and the American West, developed into "Wild West" traveling vaudeville performances featuring cowboys and Indians by the 1880s. Buffalo Bill's wild West and others became the most popular form of entertainment in America and remained so until movies gained prominence in the 1930s. The shows went beyond the cowboy sport of rodeo in an effort to preserve a romanticized view of the American West and to entertain those in the East (and later in Europe) who were fascinated with the disappearing frontier of the United States.

=== Pawnee Bill's (1901–1905) ===
One of the contemporaries of Buffalo Bill was Gordon Lillie, or Pawnee Bill. His show included such acts as horse races, bronco riding, trick riding, trick shooting, and historical reenactments. Mamie was fortunate to have joined Pawnee Bill's show when there were other performers who could share their expertise with her or inspire her to try to develop new skills. Lulu Bell Parr, for example, was an expert marksman and bronco rider with the show. Mamie, who had learned to trick shoot as a child, would have seen the sharpshooting performances of Lulu Bell, benefitting directly or indirectly from the star. Lulu Bell's bronc riding was not Mamie's forte, but she did trick riding and participated in the races and historical reenactments of the show.

While a performer in Pawnee Bill's show, Mamie met a trick rider named Herbert Harry Skepper (1876–1945) who was a veteran of the Spanish–American War and rode "Roman style" in the show. Harry and Mamie married about 1901 (no known record) and had one daughter, Elba Reine ("REEn") Skepper, 9 November 1902. While their marriage did not last, their daughter, Reine, did inherit much of the athletic ability of her parents, later becoming a trick rider and an accomplished star in the rodeos throughout the 1920 and 1930s (competing with and beating the men in certain rodeo events).

=== California Frank Hafley's Wild West Attractions (1905–1940) ===
After Harry Skepper had left Mamie and Reine on their own, Charles Francis Hafley and his wife, Lillian Smith (who had both performed in the Pan-American Exposition, with Cummins' Indian Congress, with Pawnee Bill and Buffalo Bill), asked Mamie Francis to join their venture called "California Frank's Wild West" in 1905. Lillian, a former competitor of Annie Oakley, and C.F. Hafley, a former sheriff, were renowned sharpshooters. They apparently thought this teenage mother, with her shooting and riding skills, would be a nice addition to their group who came from Pawnee Bill's and other Wild West shows. Lillian and Mamie started a comedy sharpshooting routine together, part of which involved Lillian shooting at targets on Mamie's hat or one sticking out of her mouth - requiring nerves of steel for both ladies. Another performer who likely acted as a mentor for Mamie was Ada Sommerville, a High School horse trainer. Bee Ho Gray (a trick roper who married Ada in 1912), was one of many (like Sam Cross, Julia Allen, Tommy Kirnan, and other vaudevillians) who joined California Frank's for a time or season and went on to perform in other shows (with the Miller Brothers' 101 Ranch Wild West Show, in particular).

California Frank's company and the 101 Ranch Wild West Show participated in the Jamestown Exposition in 1907, marking the beginning of their relationship with the larger outfit both at the 101 headquarters in Oklahoma (the Millers were neighbors of Pawnee Bill) and at times performing with the 101 on the road. C.F. Hafley's show was not on as grand a scale as the 101 Ranch Wild West, but they had quality acts excelled by few to none at the time: Lillian Smith was better known as "Princess Wenona," world champion horseback sharpshooter, Ada Sommerville on her magnificent horse, Columbus, danced to the "Merry Widow Waltz," and Mamie Francis began her daring horse diving act in 1908 at Dreamland on Coney Island, New York City, New York.

Mamie's performances on the high diving horse probably took more courage than any other act of that era. First, a diving horse named Serpentine would climb a ramp to reach a platform five stories above an audience who watched in quiet amazement as the horse carefully crouched her hind legs on a carpeted cleat before making a soaring leap into the air, plunging into a pool of water below. For the second dive, Mamie would mount the mother of Serpentine, a white Arabian horse named Lurlene (or "Babe"), and hold on tightly as the animal dove off the platform - the rider's long dark hair flying through the air before they hit the water. From 1908–1914, Mamie and Babe jumped 628 times with few incidents. The 1908 and 1909 newspapers recorded occasions where the horse and/or the rider were injured or almost killed: the first known incident was when the diving horse, Babe, was startled by a loud noise as she left the platform, fell sideways into the pool and was knocked unconscious. Had they not gotten her out of the water and resuscitated her, she would have drowned. Mamie was not injured. In the second occurrence, the horse fell on Mamie, breaking her arm. After a third accident, she continued diving with a broken foot 24 September 1908. In June 1909, she nearly met her death when she was knocked unconscious and pinned under her horse in the water at Bayonne Park in Jersey City. While Mamie was badly bruised, she responded to her near drowning by going on with the show. The accident illustrated her mental and physical toughness. She tried to go thank the men who saved her that day, but could not find them.

In 1908, Frank and Lillian's marriage ended in divorce, but Lillian stayed on as a performer with the show through 1910. Charles F. Hafley and Miss Elba Skepper married 19 November 1909 in DeKalb County, Georgia. Frank adopted Mamie's daughter, Reine.

California Frank's Western Attractions Show traveled all over the United States, entertaining audiences at amusement parks county and state fairs, and carnivals (Dreamland on Coney Island; the Hippodromes of Philadelphia, Pennsylvania; Pittsburgh, Pennsylvania;Cincinnati, Ohio; and Indianapolis, Indiana; the Majestic Theater in Kalamazoo, Michigan; the Alabama State Fair; the King's Highway Carnival in Omaha, Nebraska (and many more). According to the 1910 Federal Census for Knoxville, Tennessee, twenty people were traveling with the show. For the "Wild West Show," occupations listed were: Showman, High Diver, Nurse, trainer, bugler, marksman, roper, rider, musician, talker, cook, labor(ers), and gunner. By the end of 1910, Princess Wenona, Ada Sommerville and Bee Ho Gray had left the show (they may have gone back to the Millers Brother's 101 Ranch and did not return to California Frank's). For the next two years, Mamie "wore three hats" as the sharpshooter, high school horse trainer, and the rider for the horse diving act. Her daughter, Reine, who performed in some of the acts as a child, served as the bugler for the grand entries.

Sometimes real life proved as exciting as a performance (as in the following story that Mamie Francis shared with her only grandson). As California Frank's show traveled from town to town, they usually went by train. Some of the passenger trains had Pullman cars with sleeping births on them. Mamie Francis Hafley was resting alone in her upper birth when she was startled to hear on the other side of the curtain the porter of the train shouting, "No! No!! OH, please...No!" The would-be assailant growled, "I'm going to cut your black heart out!" Mamie grabbed her .38 pistol from under her pillow, yanked back the curtain, and pointed it betwixt the man's eyes. She cocked the firing pin, making a loud CLICK, and said with a commanding voice, "You're not going to cut anybody's heart out!!" and told the porter to, "Go get the train detective!" Seeing a very STEADY pistol aimed at him with Mamie's very steady focused eyes, "eye to eye," the man folded his knife and put it back in his pocket, impressed that this woman might "sure enough" shoot him between the eyes. The years that she and Wenona had shot pistols in their vaudeville acts prepared Mamie to hold her pistol so the "end of the barrel" was pointed directly at the target. This time it saved a man's life!

By 1914, Mamie was no longer diving horses off of towers and seemed to focus more on the high school horses, and sharpshooting on horseback. Her daughter, Reine, was beginning to perform as a trick rider in the shows. They were in a lucrative business for the times and, with the help of their nurse friend, Fannie Liesy, the Hafleys were able to buy a ranch near Ridgway, Colorado, in 1915. It was good to have a place to rest from all of the traveling they had done and continued to do for the show. Edmund Jaynes, the elderly farmer Mamie and her mother used to work for, came to Colorado to help with the place.

In the teens and twenties, the acts in California Frank's shows were part western history, part rodeo, part comedy, and part animal circus - all thrilling to audiences who came for miles to see them. Mamie's high school horse, Napoleon, was a real crowd pleaser. Wild West shows and rodeos in general were still quite popular, but were experiencing some competition from silent (and later, "talkie") movies. The Hafleys kept in touch with other producers and performers (including silent western movie star, Tom Mix) and stayed connected with the Miller Brother's 101 Ranch off and on. In fact, C. F. Hafley was the arena director for the 101 Ranch when Mamie's daughter, Reine Skepper Hafley, fell in love with a tall cowboy named Dick Shelton who was working with the 101. Dick Shelton and Reine Hafley parted ways with the 101 Ranch when they eloped to get married. The young talented couple were back with California Frank and Mamie at the time J.C. Miller, their former boss, wrote "Miss Mamie,"

"We had a nice visit with Rene and Dick and had quite a talk with them. I told them that I had no ill will toward them or hard feelings against them about staying with you and Frank. I know that I can get along without Dick better than you can without Rene, but any time that business slacks up, or you do not need them, I will always be glad to have them come over with me; or any or all of you, as far as that is concerned. I know of no friends that I hold in higher esteem than I do you and Frank and Rene, as well as the remainder of your bunch, and I trust the friendship will continue to exist." (July 1925)

Dick and Rene would go on to star in rodeos and fairs all over the country (they became Pro-rodeo Hall-of-Famers and more). They had Mamie's only grandson, Thomas Richard Shelton, in 1926. Mamie Francis and California Frank continued in their Wild West show without Reine, Mamie was still sharpshooting, and Frank was managing the cowboys and Indians. One would imagine that they were saddened to hear of Joseph Miller's accidental death in October 1927.

In the 1930s, California Frank's Rodeo and Wild West Show added an all-girl rodeo band when they performed at Young's Million Dollar Pier in Atlantic City, New Jersey. They also performed in Dorney Park, Allentown, Pennsylvania; and the Fort Worth Stock Show and Rodeo, and many others. Gone were the bucking donkeys of earlier comedy routines.

As the Great Depression drained their funds, the show "downsized" a bit (as did their personal property). In their routine, Frank and Mamie would ride alongside each other while Mamie shot targets Frank threw up in the air. They also trained a horse named "Ranger" to jump over their parked convertible Hudson with passengers in it. When the busy show season was over, the Hafleys would return to their ranch along the Uncompahgre River in Colorado.

== Later years and the Hall of Fame ==
After Frank died in 1940, Mamie sold the ranch and bought a house in Fort Worth, Texas. Mamie Francis spent her last days at her daughter's ranch (where the Sheltons were breeders of Santa Gertrudis cattle) south of San Antonio in McMullen County. Mamie Francis Ghent Skepper Hafley died of cancer in 1950 near Tilden, Texas, and is buried in Handley's Shannon Rose Hill Memorial Park Cemetery in Fort Worth.

In 1981, Mamie Francis Hafley was made an honoree at the National Cowgirl Museum and Hall of Fame in Fort Worth, Texas. Her daughter, Reine Hafley Shelton, who had died in 1979, also became an honoree in 1983 for her accomplishments as a star in the Wild West shows and rodeos. The National Cowgirl Museum and Hall of Fame is the only museum in the world dedicated to honoring and celebrating women, past and present, "whose lives exemplify the courage, resilience and independence that helped shape the American West." As entertainers, champion competitors, and ranchers, Mamie Francis and her daughter, Reine Shelton, were both considered well-qualified for the honor.
