= Mildred Douglas Chrisman =

American trick rider

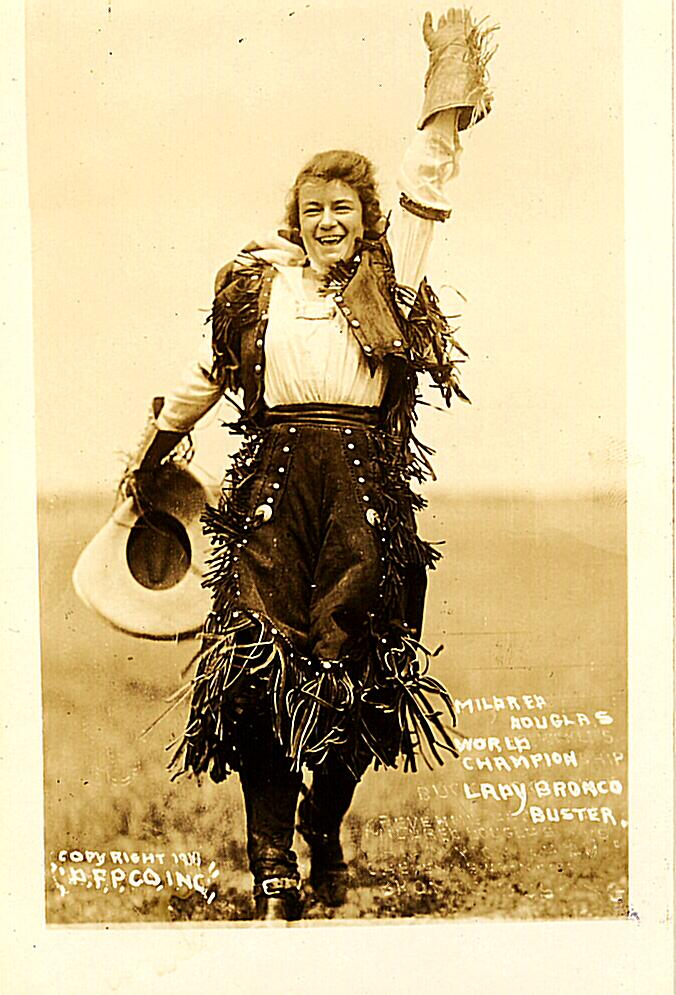
- Chrisman in 1918
- Born: Mildred McConnell; August 21, 1895; Philadelphia, Pennsylvania, U.S.
- Died: January 25, 1982 (aged 86); Lawton, Oklahoma, U.S.
- Occupations: Trick rider; nurse
- Known for: 1968 National Rodeo Historical Society Hall of Fame inductee 1988 National Cowgirl Museum and Hall of Fame inductee
- Spouse: Ora Nelson "Pat" Chrisman

Mildred Douglas Chrisman (née McConnell; August 21, 1895 – January 25, 1982) was a trick rider, supporting actress, and nurse. A two-time bronco riding champion and undefeated at the time of her retirement, she was inducted into the National Rodeo Historical Society Hall of Fame in 1968 and the National Cowgirl Museum and Hall of Fame in 1988.

== Early life ==
Mildred McConnell was born on August 21, 1895, in Philadelphia, Pennsylvania, to Emma McConnell and Hugh Winston McConnell, a mechanical engineer and professor at the University of Pennsylvania.

Chrisman's interest in rodeos and horseback riding started at age seven after attending a Barnum & Bailey Circus show. She was taught to horseback ride at a boarding school as a teenager in Connecticut, through which she became acquainted with professional horse trainers Ray and Minnie Thomson. The Thomsons owned a riding arena in Bridgeport, where they taught her how to jump and ride in a sidesaddle and English saddle. With this training, Chrisman later dropped out of school and become a part of the Barnum & Bailey Circus and the Miller Brothers 101 Ranch. She performed with Annie Oakley in 1912.

== Career ==
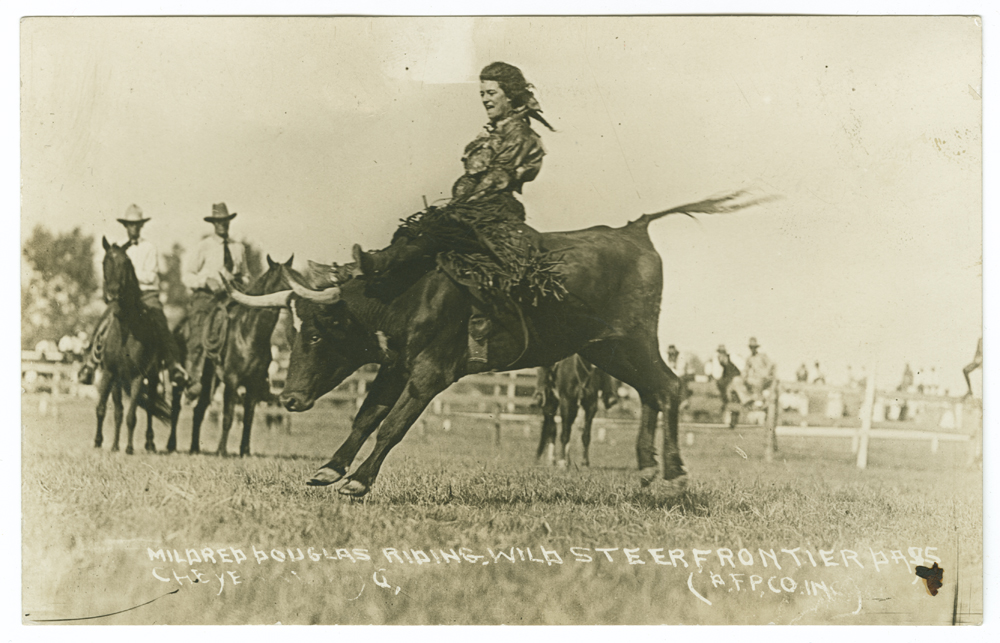
Chrisman in Cheyenne, Wyoming riding a wild cow (1917)

Chrisman was in Kansas City, Missouri, to attend the 1916 American Royal livestock show when she was unexpectedly given the chance to compete in the women's bronco championship. The event was almost canceled due to only two women having signed up, Mayme Stroud and Babe Willets. To prevent its cancellation, Wild West performer Lucille Mulhall offered her own horse, named White Man, to Chrisman so she can enter as the third contestant. Being her first competition, Chrisman was coached by Mulhall throughout the duration of it. She ultimately finished in second place, with Stroud placing first. Chrisman would begin to compete professionally under the name Mildred Douglas following this event.

That same year, Chrisman ventured into acting, appearing alongside bronc rider Dorothy Morrell as an extra in several Western films shot in Los Angeles. While working as a stunt double for Irene Castle in Patria, on Tom Mix's movie set, Mixville, Mildred met her future husband actor and cowboy Ora Nelson Chrisman, known professionally as Pat Chrisman. They acted together in three films before Mildred retired.

In July 1917, Chrisman competed in her first and only relay event at the Cheyenne Frontier Days rodeo in Wyoming. This opportunity was also unforeseen. Cowboy Charles Burton Irwin had entered two horses into the event but, following the death of his son Floyd in a roping accident, he did not want his daughter to ride them. Chrisman agreed to ride these horses and won the title of "world champion cowgirl".

In 1918, Chrisman competed in a roundup show in Tucumcari, New Mexico. During the event, the horse she was riding jerked the rein out of her hands. However, the judges believed it to have been an intentional move by Chrisman, and her subsequent win was considered to be one of the only accomplished without holding the rein.

Chrisman retired in 1921 as an undefeated, two-time champion in bronco riding. During her career, she became acquainted with several Western stars, including Buck Jones, Yakima Canutt, Hoot Gibson, and William S. Hart.

In 1968, Chrisman was inducted into the National Rodeo Historical Society Hall of Fame.

=== Post-retirement ===
Mildred and Pat married in 1933. Though retired from trick riding, Chrisman traveled across the country with her husband to present five trained Angora goats, in an act they called "The Aristocratic Goats". In addition to the goats, Chrisman also trained lions and leopards. The married couple eventually settled in Lawton, Oklahoma, where they entertained children at rural schools, with Mildred performing shooting and Pat doing rope tricks.

After Pat's death on December 3, 1953, Chrisman went back to school and became a licensed nurse. She worked as both a nurse and physical therapist at Comanche County Memorial Hospital. In 1973, she stepped down from her position and instead began working for a local doctor. Whilst living in Lawton, Chrisman was an active member in the Business and Professional Women's Club, the local humane society, the Episcopal Church, and the Lawton-Fort Sill kennel club.

== Death ==
Chrisman died at the age of 86 on January 25, 1982, in a hospital in Lawton after a long illness. In 1988, she was inducted into the National Cowgirl Museum and Hall of Fame.

== Bibliography ==
- Bernstein, Joel H. (2007). Wild Ride: The History and Lore of Rodeo. Layton, Utah: Gibbs Smith. ISBN 978-1-58685-745-5.
- Hanshew, Tracey (2020). Oklahoma Rodeo Women. Charleston, South Carolina: The History Press. ISBN 978-1-4671-3915-1.
- Gibson Roach, Joyce (1990). The Cowgirls. Denton, Texas: University of North Texas Press. ISBN 978-0-929398-15-0.
