= Mary Barton (disambiguation) =

Mary Barton is an 1848 novel by Elizabeth Gaskell.

Mary Barton may also refer to:

- Mary Barton (TV series), a 1964 British TV adaptation of the novel
- Mary Barton (obstetrician) (1905–1991), British obstetrician
- Mary Alice Barton (1917–2003), American quilter, quilt historian, collector and philanthropist
- Dude Barton (Mary Ellen Barton, 1924–2019), American cowgirl
