= Jonnie Jonckowski =

American bull rider

Jonnie Jonckowski (born Lynn Jonckowski in 1954) is a 1991 National Cowgirl Museum and Hall of Fame inductee. She is a two-time Women's Nationals Finals Rodeo (WNFR) Bull Riding Champion in 1986 and 1988.

== Life ==
Lynn Jonckowski was born in 1954 in Billings, Montana. She is of Polish descent on her father's side. She was always an athlete. At first, she thought bull riding was something to do for fun. She turned professional when she realized it gave her the challenge she wanted.

== Career ==
In 1976, Jonckowski was a runner who had Olympic hopes but she was injured. She had to find a new path. Professional bull riding filled that role, and it was challenging enough. Ten years later in 1986, she won a women's bull riding title. The win came at Guthrie, Oklahoma, where she competed on a large brindle bull named B12. The previous day she had just had a bull fall on her. The bull had seriously crushed her leg. Since she could not walk, they lifted her onto B12. She endured the agonizing pain, sprang out of the chute, and rode as she always did, like a champion.

Jonckowski's unending pursuit for the inclusion of women in roughstock events broke many barriers. In the Pendleton Round-Up, she was the first woman to ride since Bonnie McCarroll last rode in 1929. At Cheyenne Frontier Days, she was the first women to ride there since Alice Greenough in 1940. Although Jonckowski endured many hardships, her determination got her a place in the 1991 and 1993 Men's World Bull Riding Championship. She was the first woman in that event. She also made many more advances for women.

Jonckowski persisted in bull riding, winning the WNFR in 1986 and 1988. She convinced officials at Cheyenne Frontier Days in to hold women's bull riding in 1988. This followed a 52-year absence of women on roughstock. She also convinced other rodeos to follow. Jonckowski overcame many obstacles to get those championships, and she forged a path for the women who followed her. Subsequently, many more arenas opened their doors to women regarding roughstock first time since the 1930s.

Jonckowski also participated in the third season of American Gladiators, competing in the first half of the season. She advanced all the way to the semifinals, ultimately bowing out to eventual first-half women's winner (and eventual season runner-up) Kimberly Lentz.

== Retirement from rodeo ==
Jonckowski retired from rodeo to assist her father in caring for her mother who was suffering with Alzheimer's. After her mother died, Jonckowski became a physical therapy assistant. Using her dog and her Paint pony as therapy with the patients eventually got her fired. The patients only wanted Jonnie as their therapist. A visit at her home from a mother and her daughter who wanted to pet her pony ultimately led to the creation of Angel Horses. The animals are rescues who are service animals.

== Honors ==
- Montana Pro Rodeo Hall and Wall of Fame
- 1991 National Cowgirl Museum and Hall of Fame
- 2025 National Polish-American Sports Hall of Fame
