= Anna Lee Aldred =

American jockey and trick rider

Personal information
- Born: Anna Lee Mills; April 19, 1921 Montrose, Colorado, US
- Died: June 12, 2006 (aged 85) Montrose, Colorado
- Occupation(s): Jockey, trick rider
- Years active: 1939–1950
- Weight: 100 lb (45 kg) (1939–1945)
- Spouse: Wayne Aldred

Sport
- Country: United States
- Sport: Horse racing
- Turned pro: 1939
- Retired: 1950

Anna Lee Aldred (April 19, 1921 – June 12, 2006) was an American jockey and trick rider in rodeos. She was the first woman in the United States to receive a jockey's license. She pursued her professional horse racing career from 1939 to 1945, winning many races at state and county fairs. She then pursued a second career as a trick rider from 1945 to 1950. She was inducted into the National Cowgirl Hall of Fame in 1983 and the Colorado Women's Hall of Fame in 2004.

== Early life ==
Anna Lee Mills was born in Montrose, Colorado, on April 19, 1921. Her father, Tom P. Mills, was a horse trainer and racer, and raised horses together with her mother, Dottie (nee Marlow) Mills. She had two brothers who became rodeo champions, and two sisters who also performed in the rodeo.

Anna Lee began riding at a young age. She won her first pony race at age 6 in an amateur competition in Montrose, and was participating in flat and relay races by age 12. She raced at amateur tracks in Colorado and Wyoming.

In 1939, at age 18, she received her professional license from the Agua Caliente Racetrack in Baja California, Mexico, becoming the first U.S. woman to receive a jockey's license. Aldred said in a 2003 interview that the racetrack officials had tried to deny her application, but could not find a written rule that only men could race horses.

== Career ==
God forbid I should go to any heaven where there are no horses.

— Anna Lee Aldred

She lost her first professional race by a nose, but went on to win "scores" of other races at state and county fairs. During her racing career, she weighed 100 pounds (45 kg). But by 1945, having grown too tall at 5' 5" and weighing in at 118 pounds (54 kg), she retired from horse racing.

She opened a riding school in California, and then embarked on a five-year career as a trick rider in rodeos. She taught herself trick-riding skills at night in empty arenas. Among her tricks were "standing atop the saddle of a horse bolting down the arena" and "hanging by her foot from the side of a running horse".

She quit her professional career upon marrying in 1950, but continued riding until she was 80. She served as a "pony boy", leading the racehorses out to the track of the Montrose Fairgrounds before races, and also appeared in rodeo ceremonies.

After breaking her hip at age 80, she entered a nursing home in Montrose. There she slept under a horse blanket.

== Awards and honors ==
Aldred was inducted into the National Cowgirl Hall of Fame in 1983 and the Colorado Women's Hall of Fame in 2004. She was posthumously inducted into the Colorado Plateau Horseman's Hall of Fame in 2018.

== Personal life ==
In 1950, she married Wayne Aldred, a cattleman, in Raton, New Mexico. The couple adopted a son and a daughter; their daughter was killed in a motorcycle accident while in her early teens. She and her husband divorced after 35 years of marriage.

Aldred died in a Montrose nursing home on June 12, 2006, at the age of 85.

Her 1939 racing license, in the form of a small wooden badge, and her blue and white racing silks, are exhibited at the National Cowgirl Museum and Hall of Fame in Fort Worth, Texas.

== Sources ==
- Simon, Mark (2007). The Original Thoroughbred Times Racing Almanac. i-5 Publishing. ISBN 978-1-933958-38-5.
