= Goodwine =

Goodwine is an English surname. Notable people with the surname include:

- Hildred Goodwine (1918–1998), American artist, sculptor and illustrator
- John W. Goodwine (1879–1934), American politician
- Marquetta Goodwine, American writer and performance artist
- Pamela R. Goodwine, American judge
