= Faye Hudson =

Faye Hudson can refer to:

- Faye Hudson (Neighbours) (active 1991–1992), character of Australian soap opera Neighbours
- Faye Blackstone (born Hudson, 1915–2011), American rodeo star
