= Hallie C. Stillwell =

American teacher (1897–1997)

- Born: October 20, 1897; Waco, Texas
- Died: August 18, 1997 (aged 99); Alpine, Texas
- Occupations: Teacher, rancher, writer, justice of the peace

Hallie Crawford Stillwell (October 20, 1897 – August 18, 1997) was an American teacher, rancher, lecturer, and author, based in Texas.

== Early life ==
Hallie Crawford was born in Waco, Texas on October 20, 1897. In 1910, she moved to Alpine with her family.

== Career ==
In 1916, Crawford took up her first teaching position, at age 19, at a school in Presidio, Texas. She taught school children with her father's gun strapped to her hip and her salary included a hazard job supplement due to the classroom being within pistol range of Pancho Villa’s Revolutionary Army.

A year later, in 1917, she transferred to Marathon, Texas. In Marathon, she met her husband, Roy Stillwell. The couple lived in a primitive one-room cabin on the Stillwell Ranch, a 6,500-acre cattle ranch located northeast of present-day Big Bend National Park. Stillwell worked alongside her husband, learning to herd and brand cattle, mend fences and hunt game. She recalled this time of her life as learning “…to live, work, and act like a man.” During the 1930’s Dust Bowl, the Stillwell Ranch experienced an extreme drought that nearly bankrupted the ranch if not for hard work, determination and assistance from the Drought Relief Service.

In 1955, she started to write a column called "Ranch News", for the Alpine Avalanche. She co-wrote a book, How Come It's Called That: Place Names in the Big Bend Country (1962, with Virginia Madison). She became a justice of the peace in Brewster County in 1964. In 1991, she published a memoir, I'll Gather My Geese. In 1992, she was inducted into National Cowgirl Hall of Fame. Hallie Stillwell Hall of Fame Museum is named after her.

== Personal life ==
On July 29, 1918, she married Roy Stillwell, a local rancher. The couple lived in a primitive one room cabin on the Stillwell Ranch, a 6,500 Acre cattle ranch located North East of present day Big Bend National Park. They had two sons, Roy and Guy, and a daughter Elizabeth (known as "Dadie"). Her husband died in 1948, and she died in 1997, at the age of 99, in Alpine, Texas.

== Recognition ==
- National Cowgirl Hall of Fame
