= Kathy Daughn =

American cowgirl and horse trainer

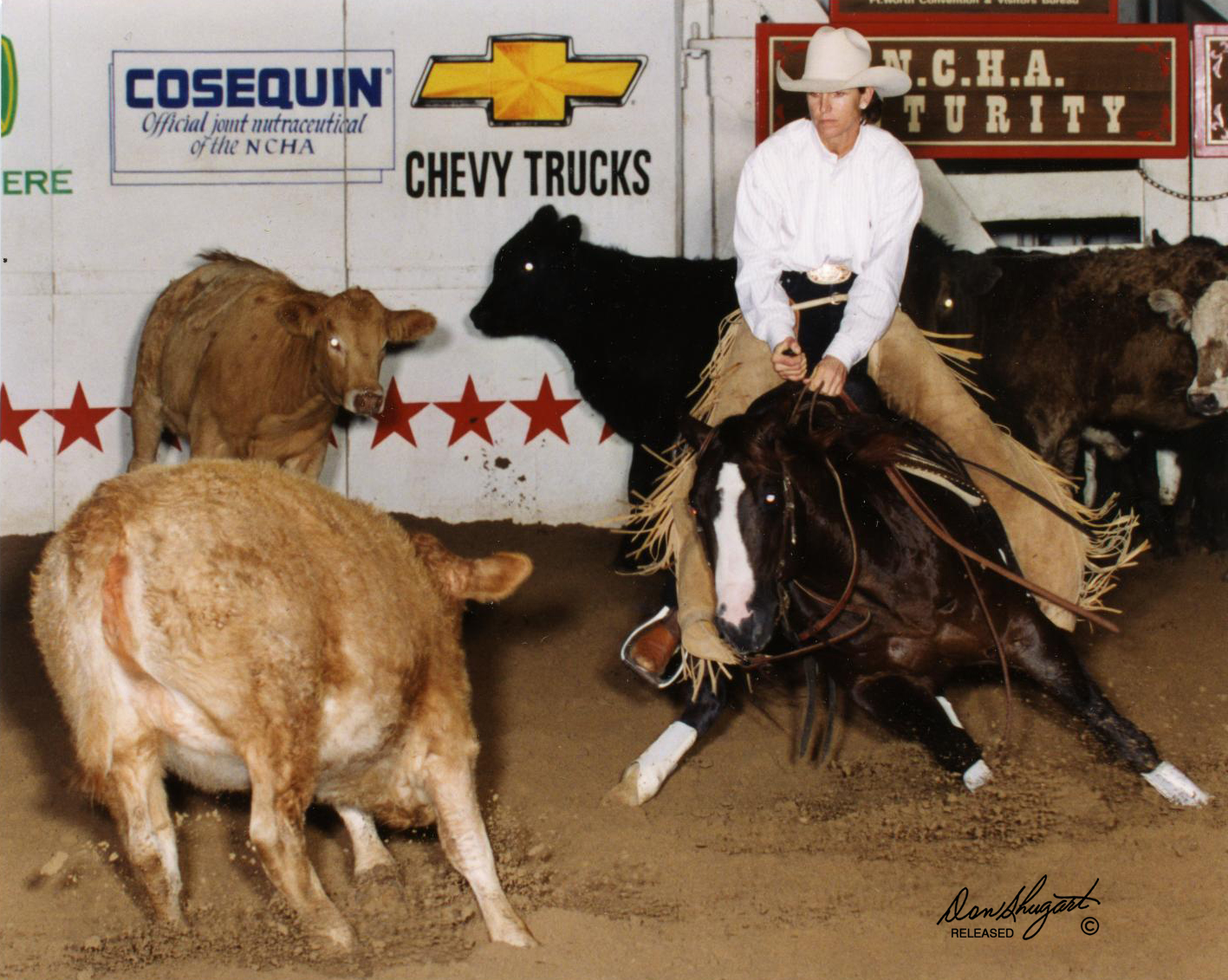
- Kathy Daughn riding Royal Fletch in the Open Division of the 2000 NCHA World Championship Cutting Horse Futurity in Ft. Worth, TX.
- Occupation: Horse trainer
- Discipline: NCHA cutting - Open Division
- Born: 1959 (age 65–66); San Francisco, CA
- Major wins/Championships: 1985 NCHA Futurity - Open Champion; 2000 NCHA Futurity - Open Champion
- Lifetime achievements: NCHA Rider Hall of Fame - Open Division; National Cowgirl Hall of Fame

Significant horses
- The Gemnist, Royal Fletch, Playin Stylish,

Kathy Daughn (born 1959) is a cutting horse trainer who has won over $4.25 Million in cutting horse competition. She is an honoree in the NCHA Rider Hall of Fame and National Cowgirl Hall of Fame, and the first woman to win two NCHA Futurity Open Division Championship titles (1985 and 2000). (Note: Kay Floyd is the first woman ever to win two NCHA Futurity Championships (1976 and 1987), albeit in the Non-Pro Division, whereas Kathy Daughn followed as the first woman to win two NCHA Futurity Championships in the Open Division (1985 and 2000).) Daughn rode The Gemnist (Doc Bar Gem x Miss Fancy Zan by Black Gold Zan) to win the 1985 NCHA Futurity, marking an event-record score of 229. After of span of 15 years, she rode Royal Fletch (Jae Bar Fletch x Royal Blue Dually by Dual Pep) to win the 2000 NCHA Futurity.

== Early history ==
Daughn was raised in San Francisco, CA in a non-horse owning family. As a teenager, she rode hunter-jumpers in Golden Gate Park, and it was not long before she set her sights on cutting horses. Daughn moved to Texas in 1980, and worked for cutting horse trainer Larry Reeder for 3½ years. She left Reeder and worked for a year with her mentor, cutting horse trainer Lindy Burch, and then set out on her own.
