= Wantha Davis =

American jockey

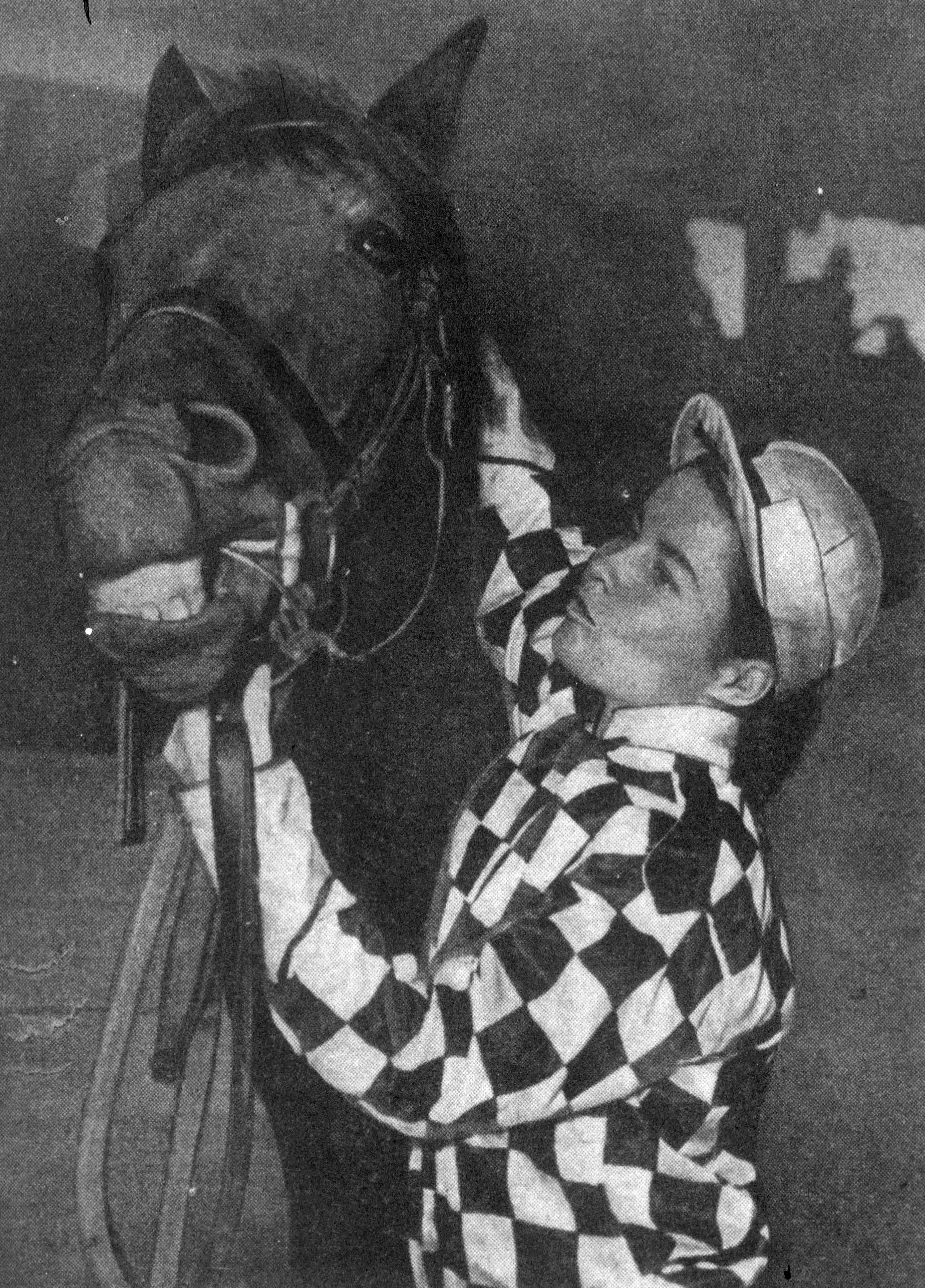
Davis, circa 1950

Wantha Davis (January 3, 1917 – September 18, 2012) was an American female jockey in thoroughbred horse racing.

== Biography ==
Born Wantha Lorena Bangs near Liberal, Kansas, she married horse breeder Lendol Davis. After graduating from high school, Bangs rode a freight train to Texas, where she found work in the stables at a thoroughbred racetrack. A year later she was back in Kansas, where she began her career as a jockey. Competing in a male-dominated sport, over the next twenty-plus years Davis won more than one thousand races at a time when women were refused licensing.

Her success was such that many major sports writers considered her to be among the top jockeys in the United States. In 1949, she defeated the great Johnny Longden in an exhibition match race at Agua Caliente Racetrack in Tijuana, Mexico, prompting Longden to immediately demand a rematch. A few months later, on April 30, 1950, Davis followed up with a similar match race victory over another future National Museum of Racing and Hall of Fame jockey, Jack Westrope.

In 2004, Davis was inducted into the Hall of Fame at the National Cowgirl Museum in Fort Worth, Texas.

She died peacefully on September 18, 2012, surrounded by her family.
