= Sharon Camarillo =

Sharon Camarillo was inducted into the National Cowgirl Museum and Hall of Fame in 2006. She is a four-time National Finals Rodeo qualifier in barrel racing.

== Life ==
Sharon Camarillo was born Sharon Meffan in Southern California in 1948. She was interested in horses from an early age and took every opportunity she could to get near them and to ride them. After her father took her to the NFR in Los Angeles, California, she became interested in barrel racing. Her father thought she should take secretarial courses. Sharon did not agree. She found Pierce College which had secretarial courses and a rodeo team. She became proficient in roping and goat tying. She earned an associate degree. She was then drafted by California State Polytechnic University in San Luis Obispo, California. Camarillo was the Cal Poly 1970 Champion Goat Tier. After she graduated, she became a flight attendant with Delta Air Lines which gave her time to pursue rodeo. She met future ProRodeo Hall of Fame inductee, Leo Camarillo, whom she eventually married.

== Career ==
Camarillo is one of few women who have co-announced the major rodeo, the Houston Livestock Show and Rodeo. She teaches students barrel racing through clinics and many types of media and has her own product line of saddle and tack products. She holds barrel racing events every year. She was also a judge for the Miss Rodeo America pageant. Camarillo is a four-time NFR barrel racing qualifier.

Besides the Cowgirl Hall of Fame induction, Camarillo also received the Tad Lucas Award from the National Cowboy & Western Heritage Museum in 1997.
