= Christina M. Alvarado =

American Deputy Chief

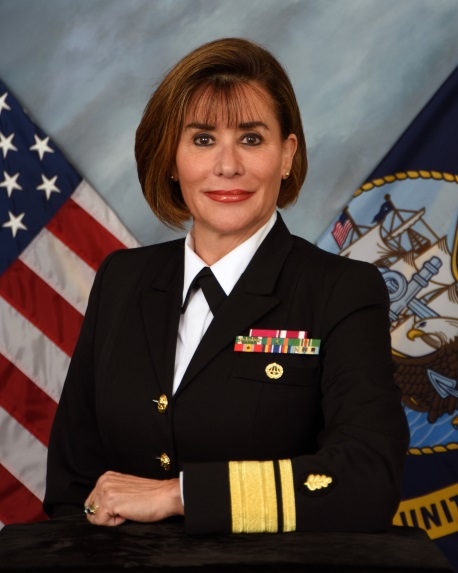
- Allegiance: United States
- Branch: United States Navy
- Rank: Rear Admiral (Upper half)
- Conflicts: Gulf War: Operation Desert Shield Operation Desert Storm; War on terror: Operation Noble Eagle; Operation Enduring Freedom
- Awards: Legion of Merit; Meritorious Service Medal; Commendation Medal; Achievement Medal; Meritorious Unit Commendation; Armed Forces Reserve Medal; National Defense Service Medal
- Education: Columbia University; UNC Gillings School of Global Public Health

Rear Admiral Christina M. “Tina” Alvarado was a registered nurse who retired after having served as the deputy chief, Bureau of Medicine and Surgery (BUMED), Reserve Policy and Integration.

She was the first nurse to command Naval Reserve Expeditionary Medical Facility “Dallas One”, the first nurse of Hispanic heritage to be selected to the rank of rear admiral (one star) in the Nurse Corps and the first Hispanic female to achieve the rank of Rear Admiral Upper Half (two star).

Alvarado graduated from the Alexandria Hospital School of Nursing (Alexandria, Virginia), Columbia University School of Nursing, and has a master of health care administration from the University of North Carolina, School of Public Health. In 2019, she was inducted into the National Cowgirl Museum and Hall of Fame. Alvarado breeds American Paint Horses, as well as competing with them. She has three back-to-back American Paint Horse Association World Championships.
