= Margaret Owens =

American barrel racer

Margaret Owens

Margaret Owens (March 28, 1922 – October 9, 1955) was an American professional rodeo cowgirl. She was a two-time world champion barrel racer. In December 1948 and 1951, she won the world championship. She was the first world champion for the Girls Rodeo Association, now known as the Woman's Professional Rodeo Association.

== Life ==
Margaret Owens was born Margaret Bolt on March 28, 1922, in San Angelo, Texas. She was raised on the NH Ranch and worked it with her father Tom Owens. Owens roped, branded, and broke colts. She admired the women competitors of her time who roped in rodeos and aspired to compete herself. Owens spent her entire life living on ranches.

== Career ==
In 1945, the West of the Pecos Rodeo sponsored a contest in Pecos, Texas. It invited nearby towns to send a girl representative. Owens was one of the 18 girls that attended. She was 23 years old, and this was her first rodeo. The rules required that the race be run in a cloverleaf pattern and girls wear "flashy" western attire. Owens was representing Sheffield and won that contest. She won the line reining and barrel racing. She also won the girl's tie-down roping. In fact, she was a champion roper who won the girl's roping contest 4 years consecutively, being one of several of the first women to compete in this event in Pecos, Texas. And, with her horse, Joe Brown, Owens beat the men at calf roping. Owens spent 21 years competing in rodeo.

Owens was one of several women who founded the Girl's Rodeo Association in 1948, later renamed to the Women's Professional Rodeo Association. She was the association's first president. Owens was a renowned horsewoman. She often rode in rodeos during a period of time when the rodeos would not hold any events for women. Sometimes she would compete after the rodeo was over in match roping events. Owens and other women promoted and assisted with all-girl rodeos.

== Death ==
On October 9, 1955, when Owens was 33 years old, she was involved in a car accident which took her life. It happened near Sierra Blanca, Texas.

== Honors ==
In 1976, Owens was posthumously inducted into the National Cowgirl Museum and Hall of Fame.

In 2014, she was posthumously inducted into the Texas Rodeo Hall of Fame.
