= Sallie Reynolds Matthews =

American rancher

Sallie Reynolds Matthews (born Sarah Anne Reynolds; May 23, 1861–September 14, 1938) is a 1982 National Cowgirl Museum and Hall of Fame inductee. She was a pioneer in Texas who wrote a book chronicling her families.

== Life ==
Sarah Anne Reynolds was born on May 23, 1861, at the Cantrell Ranch in Buchanan County, Texas (now Stephens County, Texas). On December 25, 1876, she married John Alexander Matthews. Together they had 9 children.

The Matthews and Reynolds families lived on the Texas frontier in West Texas. They were both pioneer families whose lives were well entangled together. This period of the frontier was when settlers were near nomadic as the Indians. Finding material to build homes was difficult. Her family moved often, frequently living near the Matthews family. After she had married John, the couple had 9 children. Sallie Matthews was the third generation of cattle ranchers. She wrote in her book all of the trails of her life as a pioneer.

Matthews lived on cattle ranches as a child and in her married life. Ranches were sometimes quite isolated. Her education was quite sporadic due to this. Later in life, Matthews wrote a book about the two families: the Reynolds and the Matthews. There had been several marriages between the two families, including hers. They had built quite a community in this part of Texas. The book was originally intended for children, but the information therein ended up being valuable enough that it is now part of the history of the Texas frontier. Matthews wanted her children to know the families and the ranch, Lambshead. The book is Interwoven: A Pioneer Chronicle.

On September 14, 1938, she was living in Albany, Texas, when she died. She was buried there. In 1981, she was inducted into the Hall of Great Westerners of the National Cowboy & Western Heritage Museum.
