= Prairie Rose Henderson =

Rodeo performer

Prairie Rose Henderson (late 1870s or early 1880s – 1932) was considered the first female to do bronc riding and recognized as one of the first female professional athletes. In 2008, she was inducted into the Cowgirl Hall of Fame.

== Career ==
Rose Henderson was born Ann Robbins in the late 1870s or early 1880s and raised on a Wyoming ranch where she learned roping and riding. In time, she was known for showing gymnastic skills while horseback riding and becoming a competitive relay and flat racer. Most importantly, in her late 20s she was considered the leading cowgirl bronc rider in the Westland ranges. During her mounting success she became known as Prairie Rose Henderson.

Accounts vary but either in 1899 or in August 1901, Henderson became the first female to do bronc riding, a historic event that took place at Cheyenne Frontier Days. It is also bestowed upon her the credit of being one of the first female professional athletes. In 1911, she was awarded World's Champion Bronc Rider. Notably, in 1913 she won the Saddle bronc riding contest at the Los Angeles Rodeo, and in 1917 the championship at Cheyenne, Wyoming in which she received a large silver buckle from the Union Pacific Railroad.

At a rodeo in Kansas in September 1920, while riding a loose bronc, she was thrown into a tree but did not dismount, continuing to ride after. Her head was bruised and she suffered two broken teeth.

Many cowgirls of her era designed their own costumes, and Henderson was no exception, lining her clothes with feathers, furs, sequins and chiffon. A well-known design of hers was a full signature garment, puffed, and Turkish-style pants that gathered just below the knee. The flair of her costumes was popular with rodeo fans. In the 1918 Gordon Nebraska rodeo, Henderson wore ostrich plumes over bloomers and blouse adorned in bright sequins.

Henderson also rode in Wild West shows such as the Irwin Brothers Wild West Show and a few silent Western films including Cowboy Jazz in 1920.

== Death ==
Two stories persist around her death in 1933: the first cause is that Henderson was on route to a rodeo in Rawlins, Wyoming, but the road conditions were deadly from a heavy snowstorm. Secondly, Henderson was living alone during the snowstorm after her husband, Charles Coleman, was imprisoned and she went out to corral a lost pony. In either case, Henderson went missing and her remains were found six years later in the Green Mountain region with only the awarded large silver belt buckle to identify her.
