= Lulu Bell Parr =

Wild West performer

- Born: November 14, 1876; Fort Wayne, Indiana
- Died: January 17, 1955 (aged 78); Medway, Ohio

Lulu Bell Parr (November 14, 1876 – January 17, 1955), was a Wild West performer known for her sharpshooting, trick riding, bronc riding, and buffalo riding. During her career she was titled the "Champion Lady Bucking Horse Rider of the World." In 2005, she was inducted into the Cowgirl Hall of Fame.

== Background ==
Lulu Bell Parr was born on November 14, 1876, in Fort Wayne, Indiana. She was fostered to her Uncle at the age of three when her parents died suddenly. The only immediate family left was a seven-year-old brother who she lived with at their Uncle and Aunt's farm in Fort Wayne, Indiana. On March 31, 1896, Parr married in Jefferson County, Ohio, to a George Barrett. They divorced in 1902, and she relocated alone to Steubenville, Ohio.

== Wild West shows ==
In 1903 she traveled to Europe having joined the Pawnee Bill's Wild West Brighton Tour. There, she met several royals including England's King Edward. By 1911 Parr joined Pawnee Bill's Wild West program that was associated with Buffalo Bill’s. Cody was charmed by her performance of daring: “Bronco busting isn’t a game for the timid and weak,” he said to a newspaper about Parr in January 1912. "Death lurks close every time a rider mounts up." Cody awarded Parr with a Colt single-action revolver made with an ivory handle that was engraved "Buffalo Bill Cody to Lulu Parr – 1911."

Parr left Buffalo Bill's Wild West show in 1913 and began working for the 101 Ranch Wild West program that traveled to South America. Argentine President Jose Figueroa Alcorta was in attendance and showered her with flowers and gifts.

== Retirement ==
In 1916, Parr was back in Pawnee Bill's Wild West Show and was given top-bill. Unfortunately the times were slowing for the Wild West shows and subsequently she toured one Wild West show after another with very little financial reward. By 1929, she was penniless and decided to leave the business behind. She spent her last days in Dayton, Ohio, with her brother who was taking care of his invalid wife in a dire home. She found some pleasure in entertaining neighboring children of her daring feats.

== Death ==
Parr died on January 17, 1955, in Medway, Ohio. After her death the newspapers wrote about her packed bedroom of souvenirs and the many flamboyant costumes she handmade, photos, and the Colt revolver Buffalo Bill had given her.
