= Bobby Brooks Kramer =

American female equestrian

Bobby Brooks Kramer (December 1, 1913 – January 5, 2005), was a hall of fame equestrian and rodeo performer. She was one of the earliest bronc riders who competed for money. She had a successful rodeo career. After that, she and her husband formed the Diamond A Horse Ranch. She won many awards and trophies in cutting, trail, reining, and pleasure riding. She was inducted into the National Cowgirl Museum and Hall of Fame in 2000.

== Life ==
Bobby Brooks Kramer was born Bobby Brooks on December 1, 1913, in Terry, Montana. Kramer and her two brothers were raised on the family ranch in Prairie County, Montana, which was located near Big Sheep Mountain. All three children worked the ranch with their parents. Kramer made significant equestrian contributions in Montana in her lifetime. She started riding at the age of 3. She continued the traditions of ranching taught her by her parents and grandparents. On July 24, 1943, while Corwin "Bud" Kramer was still in the Army, he and Bobby got married. Kramer worked their ranch and competed in rodeo until he came home. Once he returned, they began building "one of the greatest horse ranches in the nation".

== Career ==
Kramer attended several technical schools and got her pilot's license. The Kramers purchased a ranch near Billings. In 1968, Gary Crowder became a partner, starting the Kramer Crowder Horse Ranch. Kramer received a long list of accomplishments and awards during her lifetime. Many were from the American Quarter Horse Association, the Montana Quarter Horse Association, and the National Cutting Horse Association.

After she and her husband retired from successful rodeo careers, they formed the Hanging Diamond A Horse Ranch. Kramer produced horses on the ranch who won awards in cutting, trail, reining, and pleasure riding.

== Legacy and death ==
Kramer remained known for being one of the earliest women bronc riders who competed for prize money. She won several trophies and awards. Many of these came from cutting competition and horse shows. In the 1950s, she completed an endurance race from Billings to Miles City. In 1989, she rode with the drovers in a roundup on the Great Montana Centennial Cattle Drive. Kramer also appeared in two documentaries: "I'll Ride That Horse" and "The Last Stronghold”, featuring the Miles City Bucking Horse Sale. In her old age, she continued to show her American Quarter Horse Association gelding, Red. At age 90 she won one of four high-point awards at the Billings Saddle Club.

Kramer was 91 years old when she died on January 5, 2005, in her home near Billings, Montana. Her husband, Corwin Kramer, preceded her in death in 1979.
