= Thena Mae Farr =

American rodeo cowgirl

Thena Mae Farr (December 16, 1927 – October 23, 1985), is a 1985 National Cowgirl Museum and Hall of Fame inductee.

== Life ==
Thena Mae Farr was born in Baylor County, Texas, on December 16, 1927. Farr was raised on a ranch, and she used all of the skills she learned growing up in the rodeo events she competed in, events like barrel racing and bronc riding. She lived in Baylor County her entire life. Farr became an equestrian and athlete at a young age. In the early 1940s, she competed in the only rodeo events open to women, called "sponsor contests". These contests were combination beauty and equestrian contests. She attended Texas State College for Women from 1944 to 1945. After school finished, she came home to become a full-time rancher.

== Career ==
Farr and her friend Mary Binford from Wildorado, Texas, would discuss their frustration at being banned from rodeo competition. In September 1947, they took action on the matter. They created the 1947 Tri-State All Girl Rodeo in Amarillo, Texas. The new association was so successful that the participants decided to form the Girl's Rodeo Association (GRA). The association was renamed to today's Women's Professional Rodeo Association the year after. In 1951. Farr served on the original board of directors. She also served as president the year following Binford's term. The two also continued their production company Tri-State All Girl Rodeo to produce rodeos in Texas, Colorado, and Mississippi.

Farr continued to compete in cutting, bareback bronc riding, barrel racing, and flag racing. She won many championships. Later, when the two decided to dissolve their production company, the GRA was firmly established in most states and was the standard for rodeo, as well as the sole governing body for American women's rodeo.

== Retirement and death ==
After she stopped competing in rodeo, she became involved in ranching in her community, Seymour, Texas. There were quite a number of associations in Seymour that she participated in, such as the 4-H Club, the Texas and Southwestern Cattle Raisers Association, American Cattle Raisers Association, Seymour Remuda Club, and the American Quarter Horse Association. She was also active in the Seymour First United Methodist Church, to which she donated several items in memory of her parents. In 1985, she suffered an illness in October. She died on October 23, 1985. She was buried at Westover Cemetery, near Seymour.
