= Ann Lowdon Call =

American horsewoman

Ann Lowdon Call (1945–2007) was a horsewoman and was the 2005 AQHA Select World Champion in Pleasure Driving. She was inducted into the National Cowgirl Hall of Fame in 2005.

== Biography ==
Call was born to Robert and Maria Lowdon in Chicago, Illinois, on May 30, 1945. She wasn't born in Texas but often said she got there as quickly as she could. She graduated from the University of Texas at Austin with a major in physical education and Spanish. In 1971 she earned a master's degree in guidance and counseling from Brigham Young University. She married Rodger L. Call in 1970. They had two children, Katri and Rob.

Call began showing Palominos with her family in 1985, and she won the High Point Amateur Award at the Palomino World Championships in 1986. She began to show American Quarter Horses in the late 1980s. Call had been diagnosed with juvenile diabetes as a child, and in the 1990s she lost both of her legs to the disease. However, she continued to show Quarter Horses in pleasure driving. Call won the AQHA Reserve Champion Pleasure Driving award almost every year between 1998 and her death in 2007, and she was awarded the Select World Championship in 2005 and 2006, as well as being the Reserve High Point Pleasure Driving Amateur in 2006.

She died July 3, 2007, from complications of diabetes.
