= Margaret Formby =

American journalist

Margaret Clark Formby (July 12, 1929 – April 10, 2003) was an American educator best known as the founder of the National Cowgirl Museum and Hall of Fame.
