= Jo Ann Smith =

Jo Ann Smith (born May 9, 1939) was inducted into the National Cowgirl Museum and Hall of Fame in 2015. She is the first woman to become the president of the National Cattlemen's Beef Association.

== Life ==
Jo Ann Smith was born Jo Ann Doke was born on May 9, 1939. Smith grew up in Alachua County, Florida. Smith first worked in her family business, Smith Brothers Farming, Ranching, and Construction Companies in Wacahoota, Florida. She worked her way up and started working for several agriculture organizations. From 1970 to 1972, she held the position president of the Florida Cattlewomen's Association. When Jo Ann was 18 years old, she married Cedrik Smith. Cedrik was also from Wacahoota, Florida, a small town just outside Gainesville, Florida. Cedrik came from a family who farmed vegetables and raised cattle. The Smiths raised two children: a son and a daughter.

== Career ==
Smith continued to work in agriculture. In 1985, she was named the Woman of the Year in Agriculture by the Florida Department of Agriculture and Consumer Services. In 1984, she was appointed to the Governor's Task Force on the Future of Florida Agriculture. In 1985, Smith became the first woman to hold the position of president for the National Cattlemen's Beef Association. She was the founding chair of the Cattlemen's Beef Promotion and Research Board. In 1989, she was appointed by President George H. W. Bush as the Assistant Secretary of Marketing and Inspection of the U. S. Department of Agriculture.

Through the 1990s, Smith continued to work at her family's ranch while still working in commercial agriculture. She served on the corporate board of Purina Mills. She also worked on the corporate boards for Iowa Beef Producers and Tyson Foods, Inc. Smith has worked diligently throughout her career to improve issues that affect consumers.

Joann Smith, as an under secretary at the U.S. Department of Agriculture (USDA) in the early 90s, made the decision to allow pink slime, once reserved as strictly dog food, to be sold for human consumption. Smith later stepped down from her government position and joined the board of directors of Beef Products Inc., the top pink slime manufacturing company, receiving compensation of over $1.2 million over some 17 years.

=== Honors ===
- 1985 Woman of the Year by the Florida Department of Agriculture and Consumer Service
- 1990 Golden Spur Award by National Ranching Heritage Center
- 1992 Good Government Award from United Fresh Fruit and Vegetable Association
- Outstanding Contributions to American Agriculture Award from the National Agriculture Editors Association
- 2005 Florida Agricultural Hall of Fame
- International Stockmen's Educational Foundation Hall of Fame
- 2015 Swan Leadership Award by the National Cattleman's Beef Association
- 2015 Meat Industry Hall of Fame
- 2015 National Cowgirl Museum and Hall of Fame
