= Mary Lou LeCompte =

Mary Lou LeCompte (1935 – October 23, 2023) was inducted into the National Cowgirl Museum and Hall of Fame in 2011. She was recognized as a leader in preserving the history of rodeo cowgirls.

== Life ==
LeCompte was born in 1935. She died October 23, 2023.

== Career ==
LeCompte was a leading scholar on women in rodeo. She wrote Cowgirls of the Rodeo: Pioneer Professional Athletes in 2000. The book is in its second printing. LeCompte conducted over 600 interviews with women rodeo competitors. LeCompte wrote a biography for each women and used them to show how women started out as serious athletes, were relegated to beauty queens, and then successfully struggled back to the athletes they are presently. She includes such topics as: the near obliteration of women's event during World War I; the success of the Women's Professional Rodeo Association recovering lost ground for cowgirls; and the early cowgirl as a professional athlete and her accomplishments.

LeCompte also co-wrote with M.B. Alderson the book Step Right In: Making Dance Fun for Boys and Girls, 1973. She published many articles. She contributed to others' books. She received many research grants through her work. She supervised the sports entries for the Handbook of Texas. Her efforts ensured that all of the cowgirls and rodeo were appropriately recognized. Upon completion of her book, Cowgirls of the Rodeo, she donated her research materials to the National Cowgirl Museum and Hall of Fame.

In Austin, Texas, LeCompte taught classes at the University of Texas for 36 years. The subjects she covered regarded preserving and recovering cowgirl history. She also taught at St. Mary's College of Maryland in St. Mary's City, Maryland. She co-wrote the entry in the Texas State Historical Association on the National Cowgirl Museum and Hall of Fame with Jennifer E. Nielsen.
