= Linda Mitchell Davis =

American cattlewoman (1930–2024)

Linda Mitchell Davis (July 11, 1930 – February 18, 2024) was an American cowgirl inducted into the National Cowgirl Museum and Hall of Fame in 1995.

== Life ==
Linda Mitchell Davis was born Linda Mitchell on July 11, 1930, in Denver, Colorado. She had two brothers. Her mother died when she was 4-years-old. Davis was raised on her family's secluded Tequesquite Ranch.

== Career ==
Davis was a fourth-generation rancher. When she was growing up in the 1930s, during the drought, she studied ranching with her father. She attended Cornell University with a major in Agricultural Economics, but due to a family emergency, she did not complete her undergraduate degree. She returned home to run the family ranch.

Her grandmother could not care for all three children after her mother died. Davis was sent to the Bell Ranch where her father was managing. She had a copy of Peter Rabbit she would read. Later, she was educated at the Calvert school system in Baltimore, Maryland, through a correspondence course. She read well, and the books were suitable for children. Her grandfather had her riding horses early. In 1941, she and her brother (one had died of leukemia) went to Albuquerque, New Mexico to attend the Manzano Day School. After Pearl Harbor Day, there were fewer hands at the ranch, and she and her brother had to work it.

When she married Les Davis in 1953, they ranched on the CS Ranch in Cimarron, Colfax County, New Mexico. They had six children, who are all ranchers too. She eventually came to run the ranch on her own, sometime after Les died on May 12, 2001. Davis was a member of the New Mexico Farm and Ranch Heritage Museum. She was a founding member of the Annie Oakley Society. She was still active in the operation of the ranch, as an EMT volunteer, and with certain shared commitments to state and national concerns.

In 1985, Davis and other interested parties met to discuss the formation of a museum, the New Mexico Farm and Ranch Heritage Museum. They established a foundation for this museum, which was to be an agricultural museum. Bill McIlhaney was the first president, and Davis was the first secretary. The museum came to be established on Dripping Spring Road in Las Cruces. Davis died on February 18, 2024, at the age of 93.

=== Honors ===
- 1992 Golden Spur Award of the National Ranching Heritage Center
- 1995 National Cowgirl Museum and Hall of Fame
- National Cattleman of the Year
- 2000 CS Ranch receives AQHA Best Remuda Award
- 2000 Hall of Great Westerners of the National Cowboy & Western Heritage Museum. *She and Les were inducted together.
- 2014 "International Women’s Forum “Women Who Make a Difference"
- 2019 Leadership New Mexico Distinguished Leadership Award
- 2019 Sawn Family Leadership Award
- 2022 Lifetime Achievement - Western Heritage Awards of the National Cowboy & Western Heritage Museum.
