= Dude Barton =

American cowgirl and rodeo rider (1924–2019)

Mary Ellen "Dude" Barton (January 14, 1924 – May 10, 2019) was an American cowgirl. She was born Mary Ellen to Wilburn Barton and Ella Orr Barton. She was the granddaughter of Al Barton, an early cowboy and rancher of the area. She was the last child born of the family, and grew up on the family ranch on the North Pease River east of Flomot, Texas. She had learned how to handle horses and mules while doing farm and ranch work in her youth. Dude loved playing basketball but entered her first rodeo competition at age 15 in 1939 at a local contest in Matador.

One author states, "Dude Barton began her rodeo career in calf roping, winning at local and area contests as well as the Southwestern Exposition and Livestock Show and the Tri-State Girl's rodeo in Amarillo, Texas. She won many saddles and spurs and titles until she retired from rodeoing in 1951 (to concentrate on raising Quarter Horses.)" Rodeos Barton had competed in during her career included the towns of: Spur, Matador, Roaring Springs, Floydada, Memphis, Wichita Falls, Amarillo and Ft. Worth among others. In 1947 she was elected to be Vice President of the Girls Rodeo Association during its first year. On June 23, 1984, Barton was inducted into the Cowgirl Hall of Fame at Hereford, Texas. Today the museum is located in Ft. Worth and has been presented with the saddle that Barton won at the Tri-State Rodeo in Amarillo in the forties.
