= Ashley Collins =

American Contemporary Painting Icon

- Born: February 2, 1967 (age 58)
- Education: Self Taught - BA in English Literature
- Known for: Massive Scaled Abstract Contemporary Paintings and Combines often including Partial Horse Imagery.
- Notable work: Massive-Scale Paintings & Combines/Warrior You/ Crown/ --1989-1994: 'Encaustic Works; "Pandora," "Build," "Hiding Place of Thunder," (Related Encaustic Works), 1995-1996: Circus Pony Works; "Tricky," "Snap," *also; "Johnson Hauling," (Related Collage/Encaustic/Combine Works), 1997-1999 (to date): Portrait Works (of Scale); "Portrait I through Portrait VI," also: "America,"* "Warhol," "Eleven,"* "Mohave,"* "Check Reign,"* 2000-2003: "Fastback," "Chase," "Hope," (Related Resin Works), 2004-2009: Works on Truth; "Adelita," "Fetch," "Amadeus," (Related Resin Works), 2010-2012: Shadow Works/Abstract Works; "Abraxus I - IV," (Related Combine Works), 2013-2017+: Poet Works; W. Coin Works; Compilation Works; **'Portrait Works': "Symphony," "Hercules," "Compilation of A Thousand Stories,"* "Compilation of A Thousand Echoes," "Compilation of A Thousand Sages," "Blake," "Au-De-La-Dey,"* "Goethe," "Jackpot," Parable," "Poet," 2017-2019*: Pieces of Eight; The Skin Horse Works; "Remliel,"* "Elegia," "Vivek," "Blu," "Shooting Star," (Related Works), 2018-2020: Furious Angel Works; Self Portrait Works; "Angel Red,"* "Kiyaan," "Imagenin," "Self Portrait - Window,"*
- Style: Contemporary Painting/Assemblage/Combine Large Scale Works

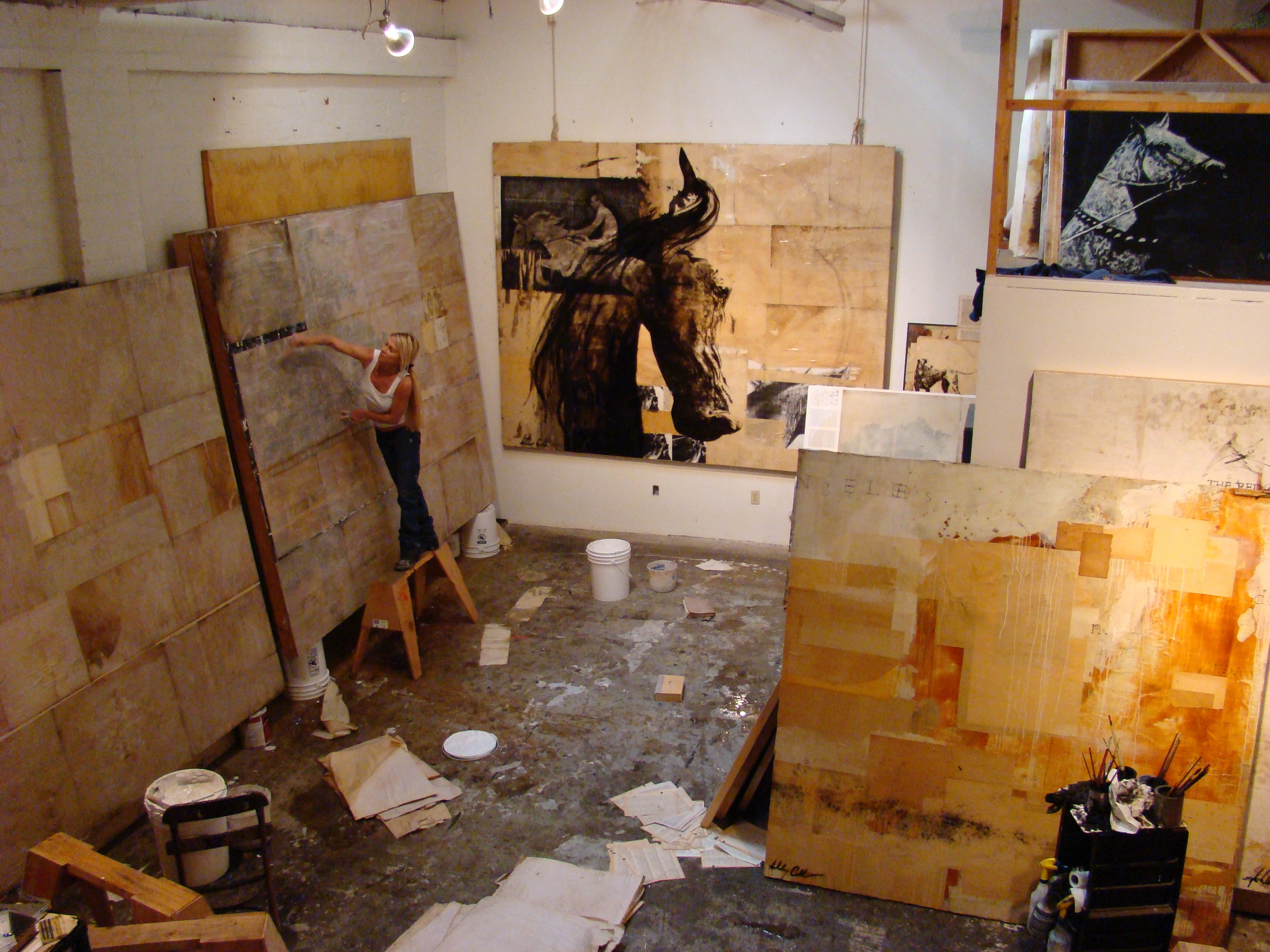
Ashley Collins In Studio

Ashley Collins is an American Contemporary Painter. Collins's massive scaled paintings are found in blue chip collections and museums worldwide. Her painful and lengthy journey from homelessness and abject poverty to acclaimed painter informs meaning into each of her deeply layered works. Collins is known in part for taking exhibitions to a new level, such as floating 8’x10’ works off of 50’ cranes and using fire, water and other elements as part of her exhibitions. Her journey from rags to riches has been one of the most successful, in American Art, and her international recognition has soared. Although painting professionally since 1988, Collins first came to blue chip collector attention in the early 2000s for her massive scaled contemporary works integrating portions of figurative horseheads amongst layers of collage, historical documents, steel, metal, and other mediums which Collins integrated into her monumental works; breaking price points for living female contemporary painters. “Collins has gone from being homeless and sleeping on concrete floors in pursuit of Artistic Success – and she has surely achieved it, her mega scale paintings including horse imagery [sic] command eye watering prices.” Robert Rauschenberg, upon seeing her works, quoted "through her eyes and vision I have seen the pain, the confidence and sturgggle of my own journey and perhaps that is what in art touches us all".

== Collections Institutional ==
Collins's massive scaled paintings have been exhibited, purchased and collected by museums, embassies and private collectors worldwide: Cultural Palace Museum, Beijing, China, Metropolitan Museum Manila, Manila Philippines, Laguna Art Museum, United States, Singapore Art Museum, Republic of Singapore, the Newport Art Museum, United States, Museum of Fine Arts, Hanoi, Vietnam. Eiteljorg Museum Biennial Exhibition, United States, Riverside Museum, United States, Cowgirl Museum and Hall of Fame [joining Georgie O'Keefe], Ft Worth, Texas, Institute of Painting, Shanghai, China, U.S. Embassy Brunei, courtesy of Ambassador William Todd, U.S. Embassy Saudi Arabia, courtesy of Ambassador James B. Smith, U.S. Embassy Ethiopia, courtesy of Ambassador Cindy L. Courville.

== Collections Private ==
The importance and monetary values of Collins paintings are driven by international blue chip collectors and include: Peter and Melanie Munk, Christy Walton, Marta Kaufman and Michael Skloff, Stan Kroenke, Blythe Danner, Steven Spielberg/Kate Capshaw, Graeme Hart, Robert Redford, Chuck Binder, Gerald and Stanlee Rubin (founder, Rubin Center for the Visual Arts), Lady Gaga, Elizabeth Eply, John Kahlbetzer, Jan Brink, Gianlucca Galtrucco, Tomas Milmo Santos, Danny Sullivan, Brenda Sullivan III, George Rosenthal, Bollinger Family Trust, Horchow Family Trust, Arliss Howard and Deborah Winger, Scott and Mer James, Dennis and Stacy Barsema, Richard Chamberlain, Michael Imperioli, Michael and Lauri Corliss, Norman Pearlmutter, Wade Skinner. Dan Romanelli. Collins work is also found in many corporate collections worldwide: AXTEL, LIAG Argentina S.A., Creative Artist Agency, The Gores Group, Trinchero Family Estates Wineries, Barrick Gold, Harris Estates Winery, Corliss Winery, Carter Holt Harvey, 20th Century Fox, Gott Estate, among many others.

== Professional History – Early Years ==
Collins arrived in Los Angeles in 1989 to pursue her career as a professional painter with great ambition, but without money or connections. Collins took any odd job that would free her time to paint, ranging from day jobs at sales call centers, to bussing tables, and waitressing. During the years from 1989 to 1992, Collins could not afford both painting materials and rent, so she would spend each dollar earned on paint and materials. She would wait tables until the close of restaurants, then return to a small closet sized studio to paint all night, and begin the process over the next day. Rather than skimp on paint or materials, she was homeless much of the time, sleeping in cars, on abandoned boats in Marina Del Ray, and on the couches of kind strangers, a repeating echo of her childhood. Collins admits her most common meal from this period was peas and ketchup cooked over the same hot plate she used to melt her encaustic materials. At one point, the actor Arliss Howard (an early collector along with wife Debra Winger) kindly allowed her to stay in his small Santa Monica guesthouse rent free each time he left Los Angeles to work in New York – a kindness that for Collins was like “living in heaven.” The home was small and simple, yet for Collins, after being homeless, it felt like a mansion. During this period, many of Collins works were painted with extremely dark hues reflecting the difficulty of these years, works which carry her iconic use of pages, layers, bookcovers, and repeated Muybridge images, but visually reflect struggle and pain. This same layering can be found in subsequent works, but the darkness of the period reflected the harshness of those terrible times in Collins journey. Collins daily routine was broken up only by frequently being fired from jobs (fatigued from painting and lack of sleep), and assembling and submitting countless gallery request. Request that for years were responded to with repeated rejection.

== Professional History - Breakthrough Years ==
After years of being turned down by gallery after gallery, being told that anything with figurative horse imagery could not be contemporary art, and further being rejected because she was female, (the art world at the time, was very much a boys club, with every gallery owner chasing the next Ed Ruscha, Warhol, Lichtenstein, Basquiat etc..) Collins took an unprecedented move. In 1992, Collins scraped together every dime she could and opened a small gallery converted from a garage on Abbott Kinney in Venice, California. She showed other artist work as well as her own, often telling buyers that “Ashley Collins” was a male painter who was a recluse from England. She would move all the inventory at closing, then spend all night painting her own work, starting again the next day. The pose as a male artist worked, and suddenly, Collins work began to sell and her art began to find recognition. One of her early believers was long term nationally known gallerist Arlene LewAllen, who designated Collins as one of her sure picks for stardom: “to my eyes she will be successful, art is her life, her work is mature, sophisticated and confident – so much so that it is contagious” Her work found its way into shows at the Laguna Art Museum, Singapore Art Museum, the Newport Harbor Art Museum, Cultural Palace, Beijing, China, Museum of Fine Arts, Hanoi Vietnam. Eiteljorg Museum Biennial Exhibition, Metropolitan Museum of Manila, Philippines winning major juried competitions and honors and major gallery exhibitions over the coming years (such as the notable 200-year-old London gallery Frost & Reed). Over the next six year period, her work became steadily more and more visible in the art markets, showing with John Baldessari, Joe Ando, Johnathan Borofsky, with Mark di Suvero, with Edward Ruscha, Lita Alberquerque, Chuck Arnoldi, Laddie John Dill, Eric Orr, Peter Alexander, with Deborah Butterfield and Susan Rothenburg, with Jim Dine, Robert Rauschenberg, Chuck Close, Susan Rothenberg, Roy Lichtenstein and Sol Lewitt,. Often reviews compared her work with Susan Rothenburg and Deborah Butterfield, but Collins work was wholly her own and incapable of easy classification. Critics were often unprepared for how any work involving portions of the physical horse could create such forceful contemporary work. For Collins, having her work elevated to exhibition with the star filled elite of contemporary art was a breakthrough moment, having gone from homelessness to showing with what are considered by many to be some of the greatest contemporary artist of all time. However, Collins still continued to meet resistance -hearing repeatedly that any work involving the figurative aspect of a horse could not be true contemporary art (a battle also still fought by Deborah Butterfield). In one of her stranger out of the box creative leaps, at the request of Richard Chamberlain, Collins did the paintings for the Movie "A River To Drown In." Collins forged ahead and continued to break price points and barrier after barrier, in a slow gradual process, with her works continuing to rise in value over the past ten years creating unique opportunity for collectors.

== The Subject of the Horse as Contemporary Art ==
Although approximately half of her body of work incorporates portions of a figurative horse, Collins is known in part for her emphasis that she does not paint horses. The horse is a metaphor – unlike those whose are attached to the western romance with horses-Collins contemporary layered works poetically address sociological and psychological issues of power, strength, love, endurance. "Collins primary collector base is focused primarily on contemporary art, as her works simply transcend and surpass other categories" Her frequent use of the horse imagery represents the soul of those in life that help us along our path and touch us in ways inexplicable. For some, these angels may appear as strangers speaking just the right words, a family member to lean on, a partner in life or business who steps beyond the bounds with true strength, or friend whose steadfast commitment shines so brightly as to allow the sharing of light. The soul that changed Collins's life happened to appear in the form of a horse. The fact that the relationship was with a four-legged soul rather than a two-legged soul, was irrelevant to Collins. It is this overwhelming love given to another that Collins paints, the form itself is immaterial. “If you try to paint the horse literally, you wind up with a very shallow image that will look and feel “off” – you cannot improve on the horse or nature, but rather, offer an interpretation that helps lift the soul”. In almost all of Collins figurative works which include portions of the horse, the figurative image is intentionally incomplete, requiring the viewer to complete the image, bringing the viewer into the heart and soul of the work and in so doing breaking the third wall.

== Current works ==
Collins mixed media portraits defy convention, a black flash of oil paint often resembling a grainy photograph artfully collaged with antique hued book pages, scraps of paper, encaustic or resin, suggesting the passage of time and personal history. For Collins, each blank panel begins with pages upon pages of dictionary or encyclopedia pages...an overdose of information that reflects the assault on our senses of our modern day world – the notion that you should be taller, richer, younger... and over this noise, Collins lovingly places layer upon layer of newsprint which has been aged outside at her studios by the wind, rain and sun... allowing nature and its layers, to calm the noise. As the layers continue, book covers, reclaimed metal, tools, and other historically relevant items become her “combine.” Pages from the 1800s bring along with them each soul along the journey who has touched those same pages – the touch of generation upon generation become included in her work. The figurative image of the horse is intertwined in approximately half of all works, with the rest becoming brilliant deep abstract colorfields. The final layer is that of a clear resin which Collins moves across her canvasses and panels with a blowtorch while the works lie flat. The brilliant resulting works have been touched by each element: fire; sun; wind; rain; touched by generations of hands; and is so layered as to provide an infinite depth of the viewer; the works both becalm and bedevil simultaneously with names from “Fausto” to “Angel”. “Visually potent to begin with, [the viewer] is compelled toward contemplation, the passage of time and the willful summoning of energy to push into the future.”

== Collins Colorfield Combines ==
The layer upon layer of paper, aged books, found metals, historically significant relics that Collins uses creates a three dimensionality that is difficult to represent in photographs. Collins abstract colorfield works, create floating blocks of aged paper, that seem to move about, somehow bringing movement to immovable objects. The earth tone colors used bring calm to the movement, yet the massive layering insures that the viewer will find new objects in each viewing. With many male artist, the geometric fastidiousness limits the work. Collins brings a female perspective to structure, loosening our idea of geometry, and incorporating nature, and the colors brought to her aged paper by the sun, wind and rain into the process, and into the forefront of our world. Collins Colorfield works often find their way into public spaces whether through corporate collections or museum donations.

== Charitable Work ==
Collins is passionate about raising money for underprivileged women and children throughout the world, in part from her own homelessness and journey. Collins has raised hundreds of thousands of dollars for charity and as a result hundreds and hundreds of women and children worldwide have been lifted up by her actions: Camp Rainbow Gold, an American camp for children with cancer; Sunrise Children’s Village Orphanage in Cambodia; Girls Sewing Schools in Cambodia to prevent trafficking, Girls schools in Marrakech to educate girls whose families could not otherwise afford to educate them, Educating children from the slums of Nairobi, International Medical Corp, cleft palette surgery in third world countries, Training centers for the handicapped, and Collins has a long history of giving back, even when she had virtually no money of her own, after years of homelessness, upon the very first sale of a painting for $2,500 Collins donated $1,000 to the Aids Project Los Angeles.
