= Faye Blackstone =

American trick rider

Faye Blackstone (June 3, 1915 – August 30, 2011) was an American rodeo star, performer, and elected member of the Cowgirl Hall of Fame. She was known for having a hand in the starting the female sport of rodeo Barrel Racing.

== Early life ==
Blackstone was born Fayetta June Hudson in Diller, Nebraska, in 1915. She self-taught herself to perform tricks on horses after watching a woman handle a flailing bronco when she was eight years old.

== Career ==
In 1978, Blackstone and her husband helped Reba McEntire, the daughter of friends, launch her career, by arranging for her to perform at a county fair in Florida. McEntire recalled the performance as a breakthrough in her career in a 2003 interview with the Bradenton Herald saying, "That was my first big fair by myself. It was huge to me."

Blackstone also turned her equestrian talents towards the sport of barrel racing in its beginning. She, along with others such as Dixie Reger Mosley and Wanda Harper Bush, were active in barrel racing in its founding. Blackstone and other cowgirls began a barrel racing event in Florida in 1950.

Blackstone and Vic performed trick riding together throughout the United States during the 1940s and 1950s. She performed as far away from Nebraska as Havana, Cuba, and competed alongside well known celebrities, including Gene Autry. She is credited with inventing three rodeo maneuvers, the reverse fender drag, the flyaway, and the ballerina. Vic Blackstone retired during the 1950s, while Faye Blackstone continued to perform until her retirement during the late 1960s.

== Personal life ==
In 1937, Blackstone married her husband, the Texan rodeo performer Vic Blackstone, in a ceremony held in the center of a rodeo arena in Bladen, Nebraska. The couple moved to a home on the outskirts of Parrish, Florida, in Manatee County during 1951. They worked and raised cattle at a nearby ranch.

== Death and legacy ==
Faye Blackstone was elected into the Cowgirl Hall of Fame in 1982, the same year that her husband was inducted into the Rodeo Hall of Fame. The Blackstones became the namesakes of Blackstone Park in Palmetto, Florida.

Faye Blackstone died in Bradenton, Florida, aged 96, from cancer, on August 30, 2011. Her husband died in 1987.
