= Hildred Goodwine =

American painter (1918–1998)

Hildred R. Goodwine Phillips, usually known professionally as Hildred Goodwine (March 12, 1918 – December 27, 1998), was an artist, sculptor and illustrator best known for her paintings of horses, western scenes and animals.

== Life ==
Born March 12, 1918, as Hildred R. Ferstle to parents Charles and Ruby Ferstle in Wayne, Michigan, Goodwine died in Wickenburg, Arizona, after having lived in Arizona for 46 years. She grew up on a farm in Michigan, and ranched in Kansas before settling in Arizona where she owned and ran a ranch with her husband from 1958 until 1965. She outlived her first husband Jim Goodwine (died 1965) and second husband Floyd Phillips (died 1996).

== Art ==
Goodwine was an illustrator for the Leaning Tree Cards and Western Art, Inc. For example, her painting of two horses looking in a window at a candlelit Christmas tree scene became the most popular Western greeting card sold in America.

Mostly known for her paintings, many of which were featured on Leanin' Tree Greeting Cards for over 30 years, they graced the covers of major horse magazines as early as 1962.

She created art focused on the West. Her work has been collected by celebrities and fans of western art around the world. Such as, the wife of the Beatles, Paul McCartney, Linda McCartney and George Hamilton

Wall Drug displays around 30 paintings by Hildred Goodwine, where several million tourists a year can see her art for free.

Her painting of Comanche, a horse that survived the Battle of the Little Big Horn was used as a book cover.

She was inducted into the National Cowgirl Museum and Hall of Fame in 1989.
