= Barbara Van Cleve =

American photographer

Barbara Page Van Cleve (born in 1935), is an American photographer best known for her depictions of contemporary western ranch life, which have been featured in 92 group shows and 52 one-person shows. A fifth-generation ranch woman, Van Cleve was born and raised as one of four children on the eastern slopes of the Crazy Mountains near Big Timber, Montana. Her parents, Barbara and the late Paul “Spike” Van Cleve (died in 1982) are a part of a long family history of raising fine cattle and horses, and running a respected dude ranch in the west, the Lazy K Bar, which has been in her family since the 1880s.

== Education and career ==
Van Cleve received her first camera, a Brownie box camera, from her parents at the age of 11, but photography as a career was never considered a possibility for young Barbara. In a 2005 interview, Van Cleve explains. "I don't think anyone in those days felt that a young woman could support herself in art, let along photography. Mother sat down and talked to me, and I decided I'd better get a teaching certificate so I could support myself" Although she had received a scholarship to attend Wellesley College, her paternal grandmother insisted she attend Duchesne College instead, which at the time, was a Catholic women's college in Omaha, Nebraska. After her graduation, she taught elementary school briefly before taking additional literature courses at Loyola University of Chicago. Soon after, she earned her master's degree in English literature from Northwestern University in Evanston, Illinois. It was with her master's degree that she joined the faculty at DePaul University, where she taught Victorian Literature and served as dean of women for several years. Her teaching career in literature and, later in photography, lasted for 25 years at not only DePaul University, but later, at Loyola University, and at Mundelein College, where she became a tenured professor and ran the photography program . However, every summer after the academic year she would return home to Montana to run the corral program, take photographs and lead pack trips at the Lazy K Bar ranch

1963, she founded a stock photography agency in Chicago, which supplied pictures for publishing houses and advertising agencies. By the time Van Cleve sold the business in 1980, it represented over 100 photographers around the world, and offered a selection of more than a million images and, according to her, was the largest of such agency in Chicago. In 1979 she decided to put herself to the test to see if she could make a living as a photographer. Subsequently, she left teaching and sold the agency, which enabled her to move to Santa Fe, New Mexico. By 1985, she had been in several group shows, but that year she approached Elaine Horwitch, owner and operator of the Elaine Horwich Gallery, with 38 x 48 framed photographs, which at the time, had never been seen printed at that size before in Santa Fe. Elaine was impressed, and agreed to give Van Cleve a solo exhibition of her work. It was this show, which sold all but two pieces, that was the turning point of Barbara Van Cleve's career. Since then, she has had 52 solo exhibitions and 92 selected group exhibitions of her work. She has also published four books, including Roughstock Sonnets and All This Way for the Short Ride, both in collaboration with cowboy poet Paul Zarzyski, as well as Holding the Reins: A Ride through Cowgirl Life, and Hard Twist: Western Ranch Women. Presently, she lives and works both in Santa Fe, New Mexico during winters, and back in her hometown in Big Timber, Montana, during summers, helping the family ranch.

== Publications ==
- Roughstock Sonnets, September 1989
- Hard Twist: Western Ranch Women, October, 1995
- Pure Quill: Photographs by Barbara Van Cleve, September 15, 2016

== Awards ==
- National Cowgirl Museum Hall of Fame, November 1995
- New Mexico/ Arizona Book Co-Op Best Book (Adult Division) & Best Art Book for Pure Quill, November 2016
- Western Heritage Award for Best Photography Book for Pure Quill, February 2017
- Montana Cowboy Hall of Fame and Western Heritage Center, 2025 Class.
