= Alice Greenough Orr =

American rodeo performer (1902–1995)

- Born: March 17, 1902; Red Lodge, Montana, US
- Died: August 20, 1995 (aged 93); Tucson, Arizona, US
- Occupations: Rodeo performer and manager
- Awards: National Cowboy Hall of Fame

Alice Greenough Orr (March 17, 1902 – August 20, 1995) was an internationally known rodeo performer and rodeo organizer who was inducted into the Rodeo Hall of Fame, the National Cowgirl Museum and Hall of Fame, and the Montana Cowboy Hall of Fame. She has been described as "hands down the first rodeo queen."

== Background ==
Alice Greenough Orr was born in 1902 and raised on a ranch near Red Lodge, Montana, where she learned to train horses. She had a particular aptitude for staying on bucking horses, and as a result, her father gave her his most difficult animals to train. Orr first rode a bucking horse in rodeo competition at Forsyth, Montana, when the cowboys competing at the event dared her to do it. Orr quit school when she was 14 and for three years delivered mail on horseback along a 35 mi (56 km) route. Orr sought to become a forest ranger, but the end of World War I foreclosed such work for women because of the large number of soldiers returning from the war. Instead, she married Ray Cahill and had two children.

== Career ==
We came from a great era. We called ourselves the 'Wild Bunch.'

— Alice Greenough Orr

After her first marriage ended, she worked at a boarding house, then turned to a career in rodeo, both in competitive and exhibition events. Her interest in bronc riding began in 1929, when she and her sister, Marge Greenough Henson (1908–2004), answered an advertisement from Jack King's Wild West Show. In 1936, Orr joined with other rodeo cowboys who sought protection from financial exploitation and better pay for their accomplishments. She became a foundling member of the group which became the Professional Rodeo Cowboys Association. Greenough Orr was four times the women's world saddle bronc champion, and in Australia, won the women's buck-jumping competition in Melbourne twice. As performers, the Greenough sisters rode saddle broncs, did trick riding and even did some bull riding. The two sisters, along with their brothers, Bill and Thurkel ("Turk"), were collectively called the "Riding Greenoughs".

In the 1940s, she paired with a long-time friend, Joe Orr (1905–1978), and they created their own show, the Greenough-Orr Rodeo, which toured the US and Canada. The couple married in 1958. Their rodeo put on the first women's barrel racing events, and Greenough Orr is credited with inventing the competition. She also performed exhibitions of saddle bronc riding, an event that had been discontinued on the women's rodeo circuit. Greenough Orr performed in forty-six states, and notably appeared at Boston Garden and at Madison Square Garden. She also toured Australia and Europe, and when she visited the United Kingdom, she was once invited for tea with the Queen.

Greenough Orr agreed to any number of commercial endorsements, including some for cigarettes even though she did not smoke. She did some stunt riding in film and television. Her appearances included the 1937 film "The Californians", and the 1970s-1980s television series, Little House on the Prairie. She retired from rodeo riding in 1954 at age 52, but occasionally did movie and television work until she was 80. Her last public appearance on a horse occurred in 1992 when she rode in a parade in Red Lodge.

== Legacy ==
Greenough Orr lived in Tucson, Arizona in retirement, where she died in 1995. Among her accomplishments, she was in the first group of women inducted into the National Cowgirl Hall of Fame in 1975. She was inducted into Rodeo Hall of Fame in 1983, and the Montana Cowboy Hall of Fame in 2010. She was also listed as one of the "100 Most Influential Montanans of the [20th] Century."

== Sources ==
- Lecompte, Mary Lou (2000). Cowgirls of the Rodeo: Pioneer Professional Athletes. University of Illinois Press. ISBN 9780252068744.
