= Trick riding =

Performing stunts while riding a horse

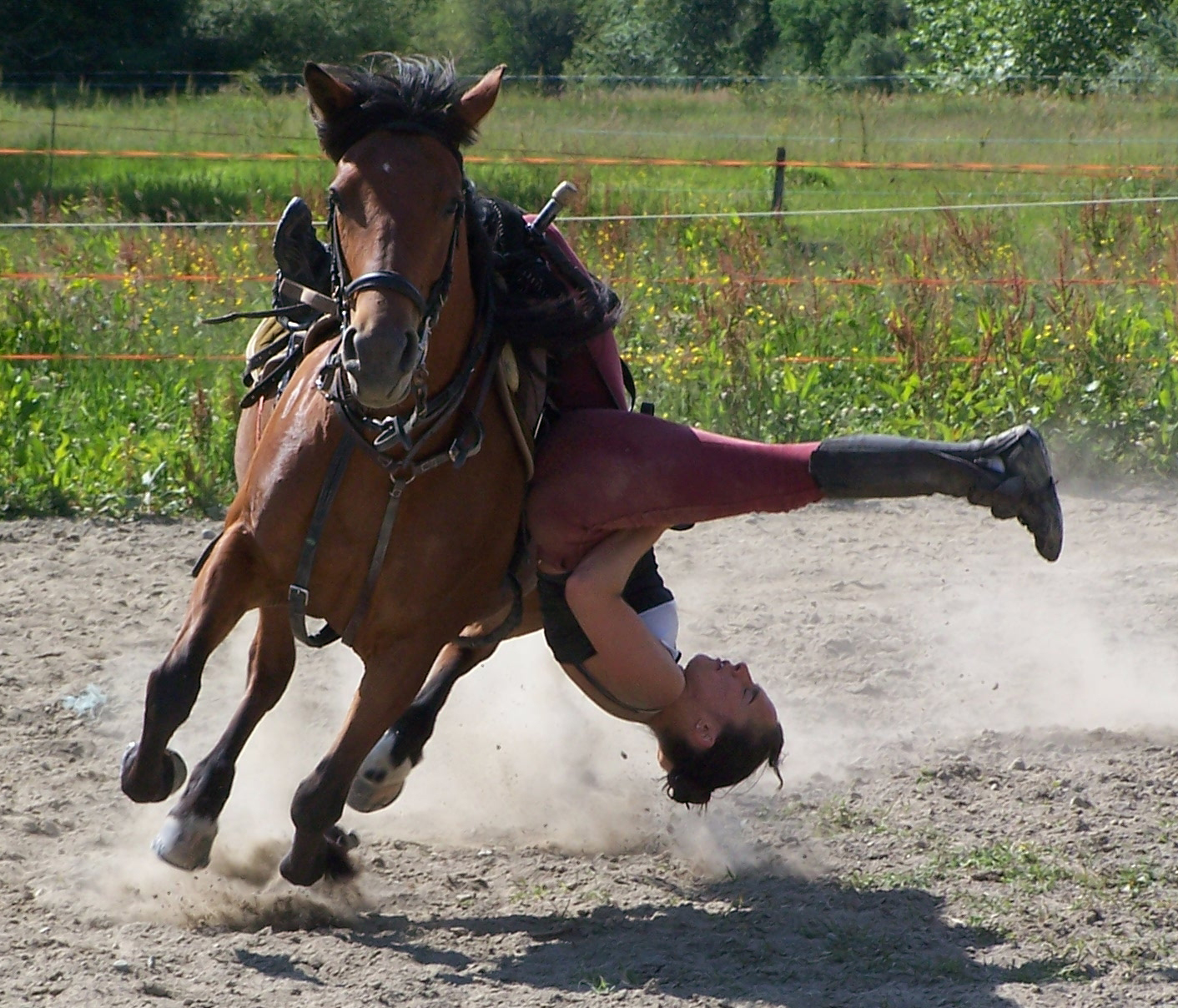
The Cossack Drag or Death Drag.

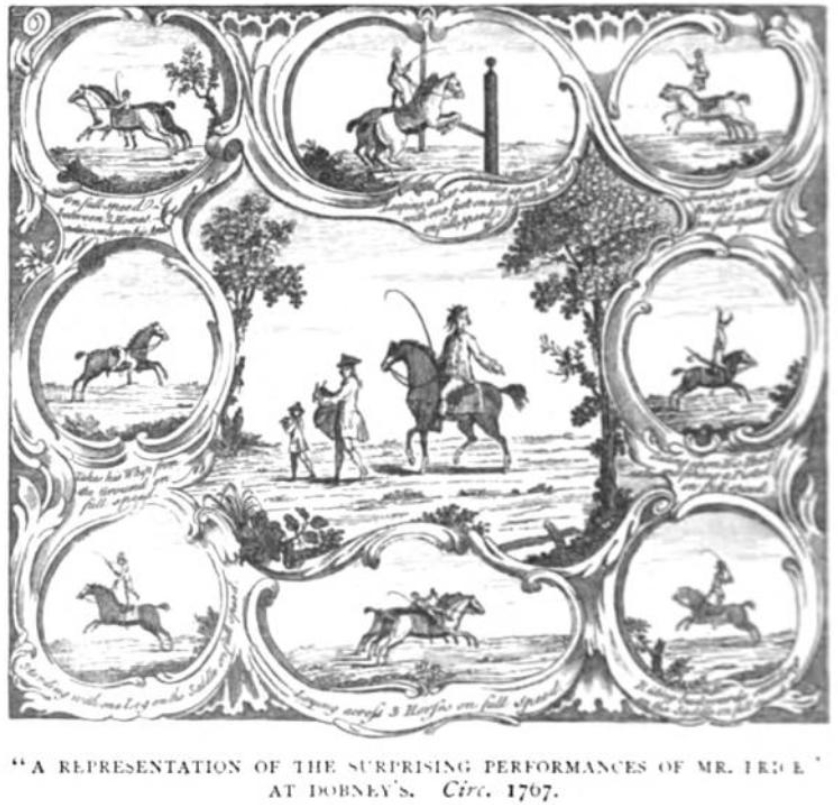
Trick riding by Mr. Price in the 18th Century

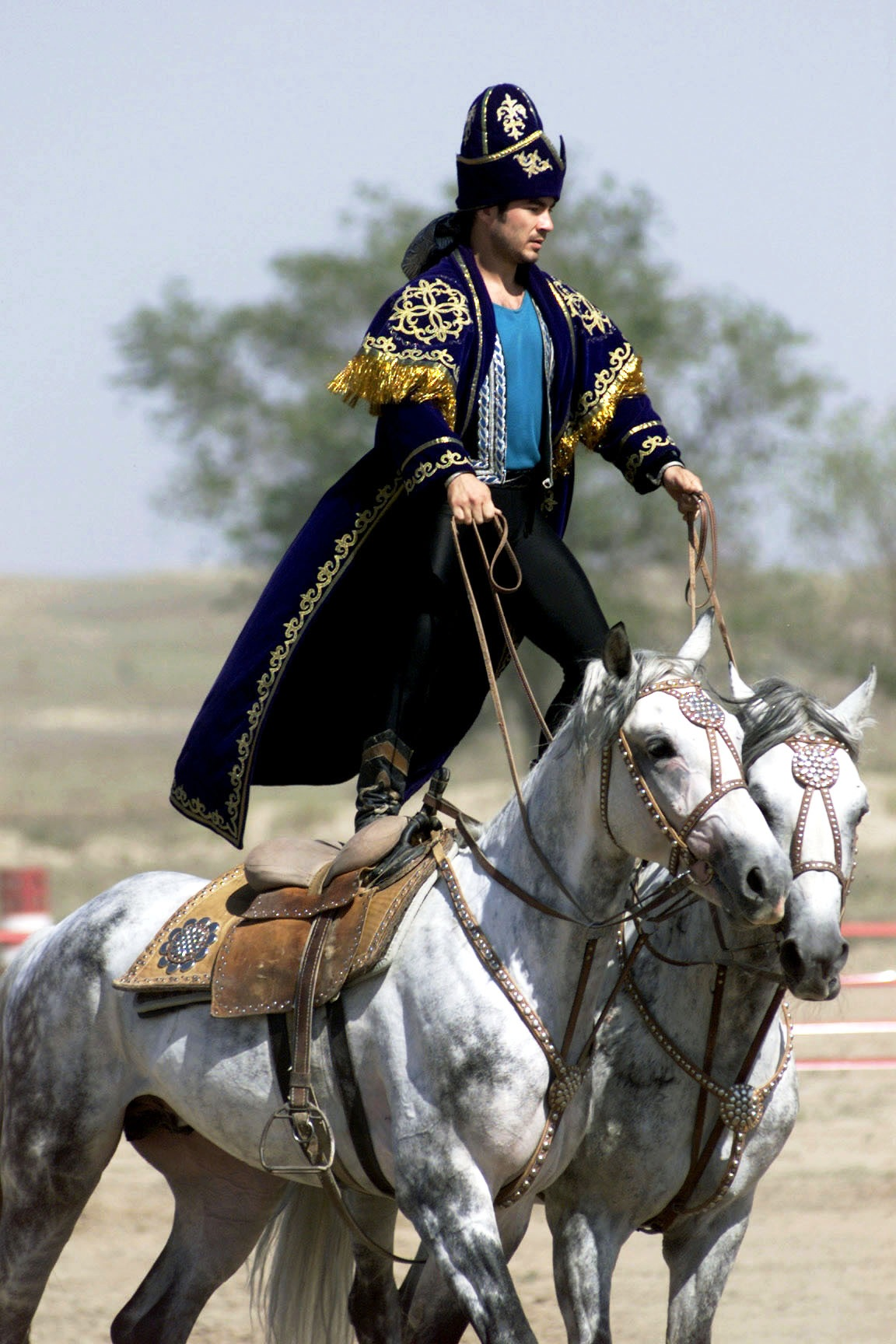
Roman riding

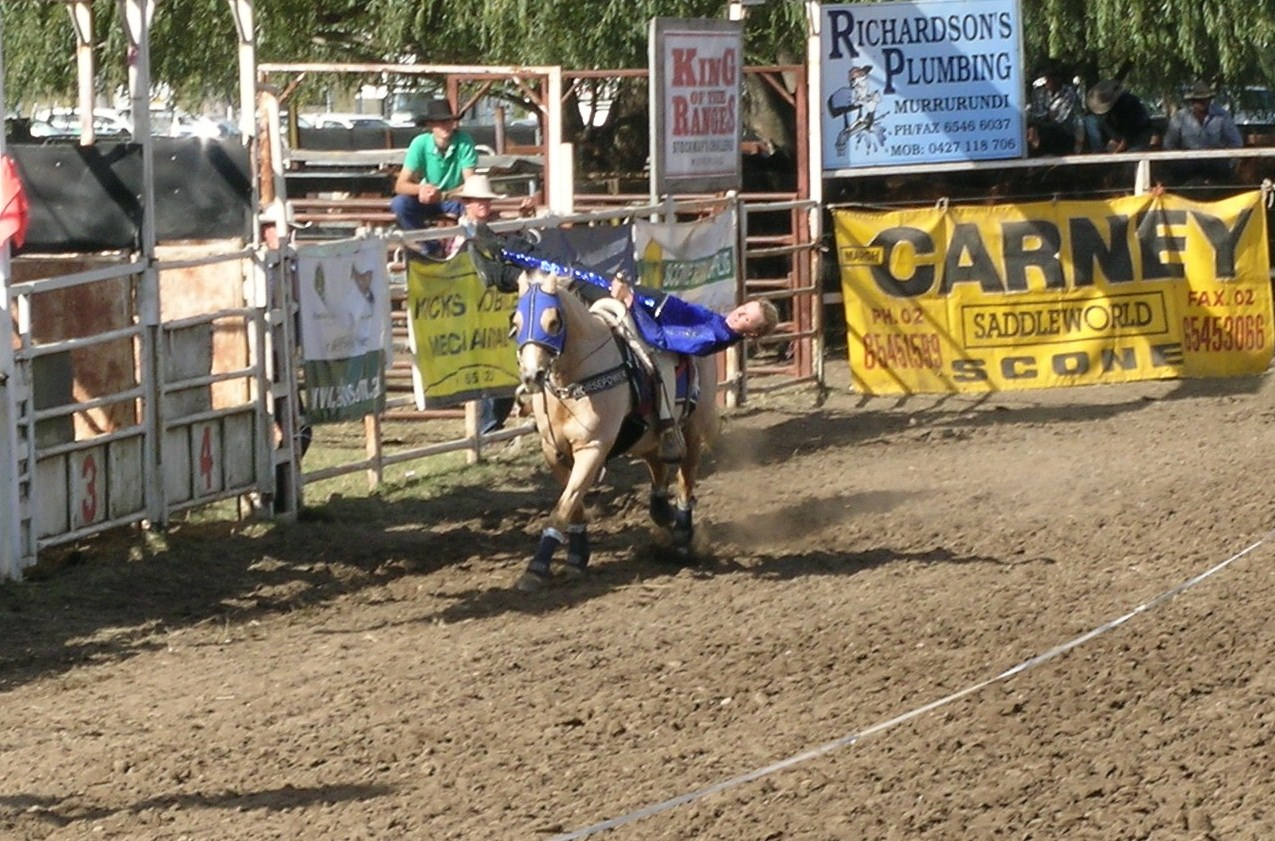
Stunt riding at the King of the Ranges competition day, Murrurundi, NSW

Trick riding refers to the act of performing stunts while horseback riding, such as the rider standing upright on the back of a galloping horse, using a specially designed saddle with a reinforced steel horn, and specialized kossak loops for hands and feet. The horse is likewise galloping free. Trick riding is not to be confused with equestrian vaulting, which is an internationally recognized competitive sport governed by the Federation Equestre Internationale (FEI).

Horse riding stunts have been performed in many films, such as Roman racing in the 1925 Hollywood silent movie The Calgary Stampede where cowboy actor Hoot Gibson rides to the championship in the Roman race, and the film Ben Hur, as well as in equestrian events such as Equitana and the official opening of the Australian Equine and Livestock Events Centre, rodeos, and much more.

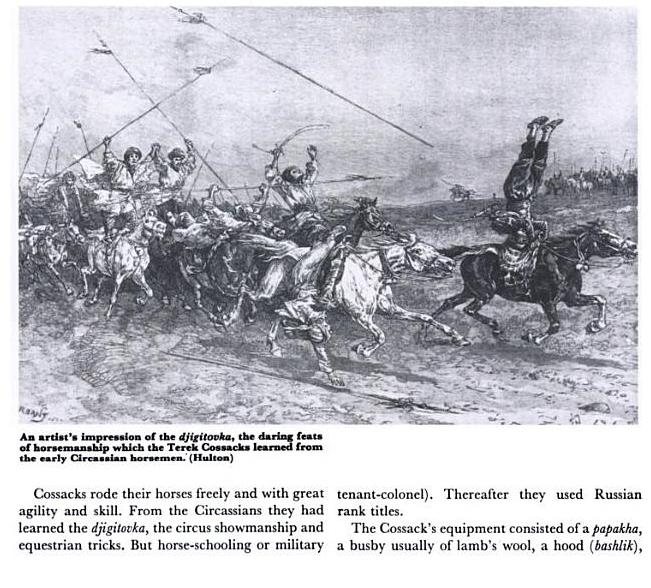
Albert SEATON - The Cossacks published in 1972.

Trick riding as a popular entertainment was practiced in Europe in the 18th century. The 18th century trick rider and memoirist Thomas Hammond describes performances in several European countries, including by himself and by James Wolton, the master who taught him. Some of their stunts, and those of their only competitor, the more famous Mr. Price, are illustrated in the old engraving shown here. The captions of the depicted stunts, clockwise from top left, read:

- On full speed between 2 Horses, riding only on his Arms.
- Leaping a Bar standing upon 2 Horses with one foot on each Saddle on full speed.
- Jumping as He rides 2 Horses on full speed.
- Riding upon His Head and fireing a Pistol on full speed.
- Riding backwards standing on the Saddle on full speed.
- Laying across 3 Horses on full speed.
- Standing with one Leg on the Saddle on full speed.
- Takes his Whip from the Ground on full speed.

Hammond's memoir included 14 hand-colored plates of Mr. Price's stunts, purchased by Wolton and Hammond from Mr. Price. These are reproduced in the 2017 edition, with the original French captions.

Trick riding has been called the most daredevil of horsemanship, where gymnastic skills of strength and balance are needed. Using a special stunt saddle, the rider performs physically demanding stunts such as the classic standing hippodrome, the shoulder stand, the tail drag, and the suicide drag, and other stunts all while hanging to the side of the saddle, or standing on the saddle, or twirling on the saddle horn or swinging under the belly of the galloping horse from one side to another.

Up to the mid 1930s, trick riding was a popular rodeo contest, with prize money and world champions declared. World titles were declared at the biggest rodeos in Winnipeg, Chicago, New York and London, England.

Champions had to have the best balance, poise and style, plus the most difficult stunts.

"Suicide" Ted Elder, who was called "Suicide" because of his daring stunts such as the "suicide drag," was one of the best of these early day performers winning seven world championships during his career.

Vera Mcginnis, Florence LaDue, and Tad Lucas are some famous female trick riders.

Dick Griffith, Earl Bascom and Weldon Bascom were famous rodeo bull riders, as well as accomplished trick riders.

Trick riders such as Shirley Lucas and Sharon Lucas became famous horse stunt women doubling for many movie stars such as Marilyn Monroe, Lauren Bacall, Betty Grable, Lana Turner, and many more. In films, stunt riders have included Hank Durnew and Ken Maynard (1895–1973).

Trick riding is still prevalent today, both in the film world and in rodeo. Tad Griffith, who is a third generation trick rider and at his prime was considered the greatest trick rider in the world, has taught actors how to trick ride for films such as John Wick 3, Alden Ehrenreich in Hail, Caesar!, and has performed trick riding in films including The Mask of Zorro. His sons, Gattlin Griffith, Callder Griffith, Arrden Griffith, and Garrison Griffith, have all continued trick riding, on-screen and in the arena.

One type of trick riding is known as "Roman riding", and is usually performed as entertainment in rodeos, circuses and horse shows. In Roman riding, the rider stands atop a pair of horses, tethered together, with one foot on each horse.

"Roman standing racing" has been popular since the early days of rodeo, as a contest with prize money, where riders and horsemen race around a dirt track for the championship.

"Roman running jump" is a specialty act, where the rider and horses jump, at full gallop, over a convertible automobile or other barrier. Ted Elder used this act only adding to the excitement by adding flames which the horse and rider jumped through.

The Canadian Trick Riding Hall of Fame was established to honor and preserve the history of Canadian trick riding.
