= Roy Cooper (rodeo cowboy) =

American rodeo cowboy (1955–2025)

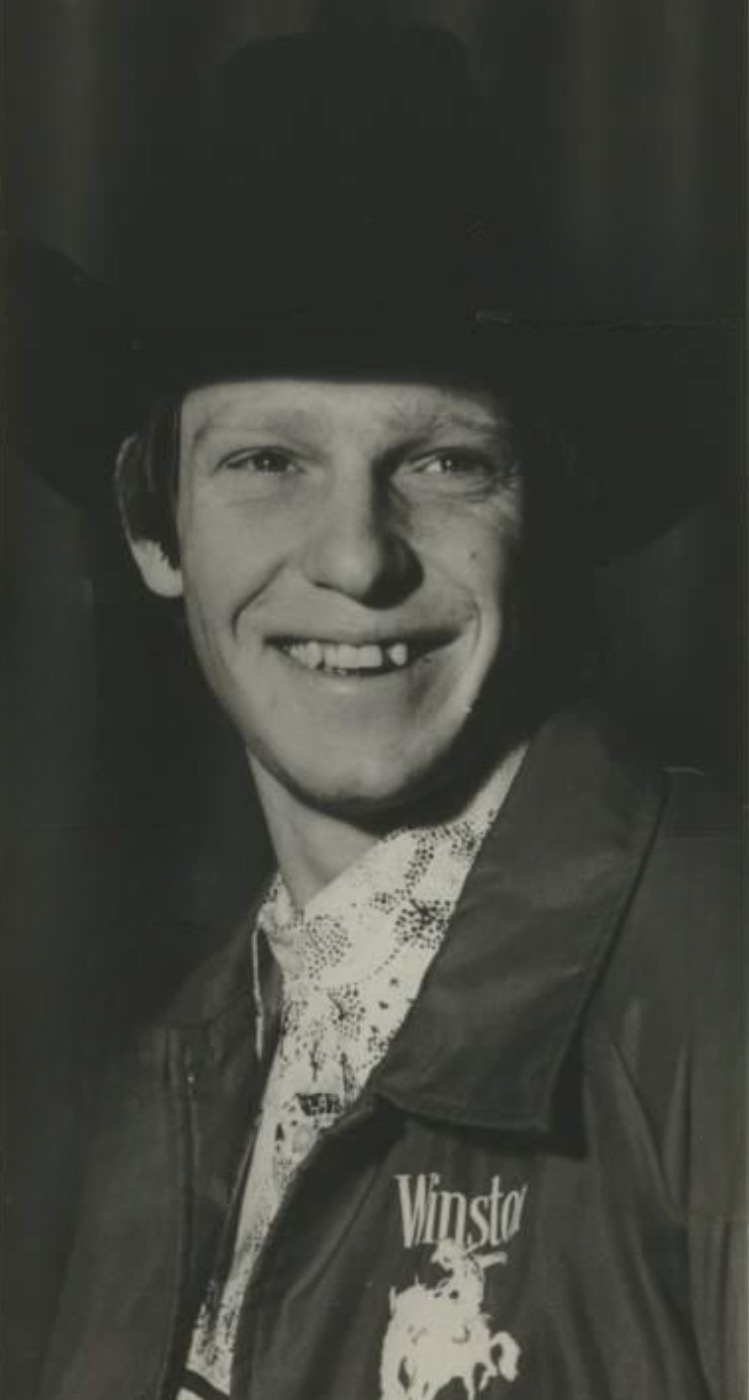
- Cooper in 1976
- Born: Roy Dale Cooper; November 13, 1955; Hobbs, New Mexico, U.S.
- Died: April 29, 2025 (aged 69); Decatur, Texas, U.S.
- Occupation: Rodeo cowboy
- Children: 3

Roy Dale Cooper (November 13, 1955 – April 29, 2025) was an American professional rodeo cowboy who competed in Professional Rodeo Cowboys Association (PRCA) events for more than two decades. He won the all-around world championship in 1983 and claimed seven individual discipline championships, including six tie-down roping titles. Cooper won the PRCA's Rookie of the Year award in 1976, and was nicknamed "Super Looper" for his roping ability. The ProRodeo Hall of Fame inducted Cooper in its Tie-Down Roping category in 1979.

== Early life ==
Cooper was born on November 13, 1955 in Hobbs, New Mexico, and raised on a ranch. He suffered from asthma in his youth, and hair from horses caused him allergies. However, he began to practice roping when he was three to five years old, depending on the source. Cooper stopped being affected by asthma prior to attending high school, and he competed in American Junior Rodeo Association events, winning an award as "outstanding individual in 25 years" in 1977. Two years earlier, he had won the calf-roping title of the National Intercollegiate Rodeo Association; his father, Tuffy, won the organization's title in the discipline in 1950. He went to Southeastern Oklahoma State University and was a journalism major.

== Rodeo career ==
In his rookie PRCA season, 1976, Cooper won the organization's tie-down roping championship and led the event in average earnings at the National Finals Rodeo (NFR). He broke the record for the most prize money won by a rookie cowboy, and earned the PRCA's Rookie of the Year award. In 1977, Cooper was the third-leading earner at the NFR's roping event. At the 1978 Cheyenne Frontier Days rodeo, he led all cowboys in prize money won, and his calf-roping winnings were the largest recorded in any non-NFR event at the time. After breaking one of his wrists the previous year, Cooper won his second calf-roping season championship in 1980, and had a third-place NFR average earnings finish in the discipline. The following year, he earned his second straight season calf-roping title. However, he narrowly lost out on the PRCA's all-around season championship to his cousin, Jimmie Cooper, who earned $47.60 more in prize money than he did during 1981.

Cooper had almost $100,000 (equivalent to $350,000 in 2024) in earnings in 1981, and was approaching $400,000 (equivalent to $1,300,000 in 2024) in career earnings in 1982. He won his third consecutive PRCA tie-down roping championship, and fourth overall, in 1982, rallying from a prize money deficit of nearly $15,000 at the season-ending NFR. A second-place finish in that event's tie-down roping competition was enough for him to pass Jerry Jetton, the previous leader. Cooper's total earnings for the year neared $100,000 again, and in the season-long all-around competition, he placed fourth. In 1983, Cooper won the all-around championship, National Finals Steer Roping (NFSR) title, and calf-roping championship. This made him the first PRCA competitor since 1958 to win three discipline season championships, and the fourth in PRCA history. Cooper broke the record for yearly prize winnings with $153,390.84 in earnings, and claimed the all-around and tie-down roping average earnings titles at the NFR. In calf roping, he set a season record in earnings with $122,455 for the year.

After holding the lead in the all-around standings late in the NFR, Cooper ended up in second place for the year, behind Dee Pickett. He did manage to win his fifth straight calf roping season championship. In steer roping, Cooper was unable to defend his 1983 championship title; he was in seventh place before a win in the discipline at the NFSR caused him to move up to fourth for the year. In 1985, Cooper wound up second in calf roping for the season, though he was the discipline's champion in the Winston Tour series. He won the Cheyenne Frontier Days rodeo's all-around title in 1989, and by September 1990 was the PRCA's all-time leading money winner with career earnings of more than $1.1 million. Cooper was in sixth place in the 1990 PRCA NFSR standings, before breaking his left wrist and suffering a concussion in an automobile accident.

Cooper eventually returned to competition, but had another injury setback in 1993, when he pulled a groin and missed three months of rodeos. Later that year, he won all-around and steer-roping championships at Cheyenne Frontier Days. In 1994, he was out of action for much of the year after rotator cuff surgeries. He claimed a calf-roping title at the 1995 San Antonio Stock Show & Rodeo. Later in the year he had the fastest average calf-roping time at the NFR, which was later described as Cooper's "favorite moment" at the event. Cooper finished second in the all-around standings in 1996. That year, he led the NFSR in average earnings in steer roping; Cooper became the first cowboy to win four NFR average steer roping titles, a record that has since been surpassed by Guy Allen. It was the eighth NFR average title of his career and his ninth overall NFR championship, counting his 1983 all-around victory. As of 2016, he was second among cowboys in NFR titles, behind Trevor Brazile, and first with all-around championships excluded. At a 2000 rodeo in Lovington, New Mexico, he surpassed $2 million in earnings; Cooper was the first to reach this mark in rodeo. As of 2011, Cooper remained a part-time competitor in rodeo events. By 2016, he had retired.

== Personal life and death ==
Several members of Cooper's family have competed in rodeo events. His father, Tuffy, was a PRCA cowboy who was inducted into the National Cowboy Hall of Fame in 1998; he taught roping to Roy when he was a child. Cooper's sister, Betty Gayle, was a champion in cowgirl events and is in the National Cowgirl Hall of Fame. He also had a brother, Clay, who was a professional rodeo cowboy, as was his cousin Jimmie. Cooper had three sons—Clif, Clint, and Tuf—who are all PRCA cowboys. They all participated in the 2010 NFR's tie-down roping event, making it the first time three brothers had done so. Tuf won three PRCA tie-down roping world championships in 2011, 2012, and 2014, and was the winner of the 2017 PRCA all-around world title. Cooper's stepdaughter, Shada, is married to Trevor Brazile, a 26-time PRCA world champion.

On April 29, 2025, Cooper died in a house fire at his property in Decatur, Texas, at the age of 69. His memorial service was held on May 26, 2025, at Cowtown Coliseum in Fort Worth, Texas.

== Legacy ==
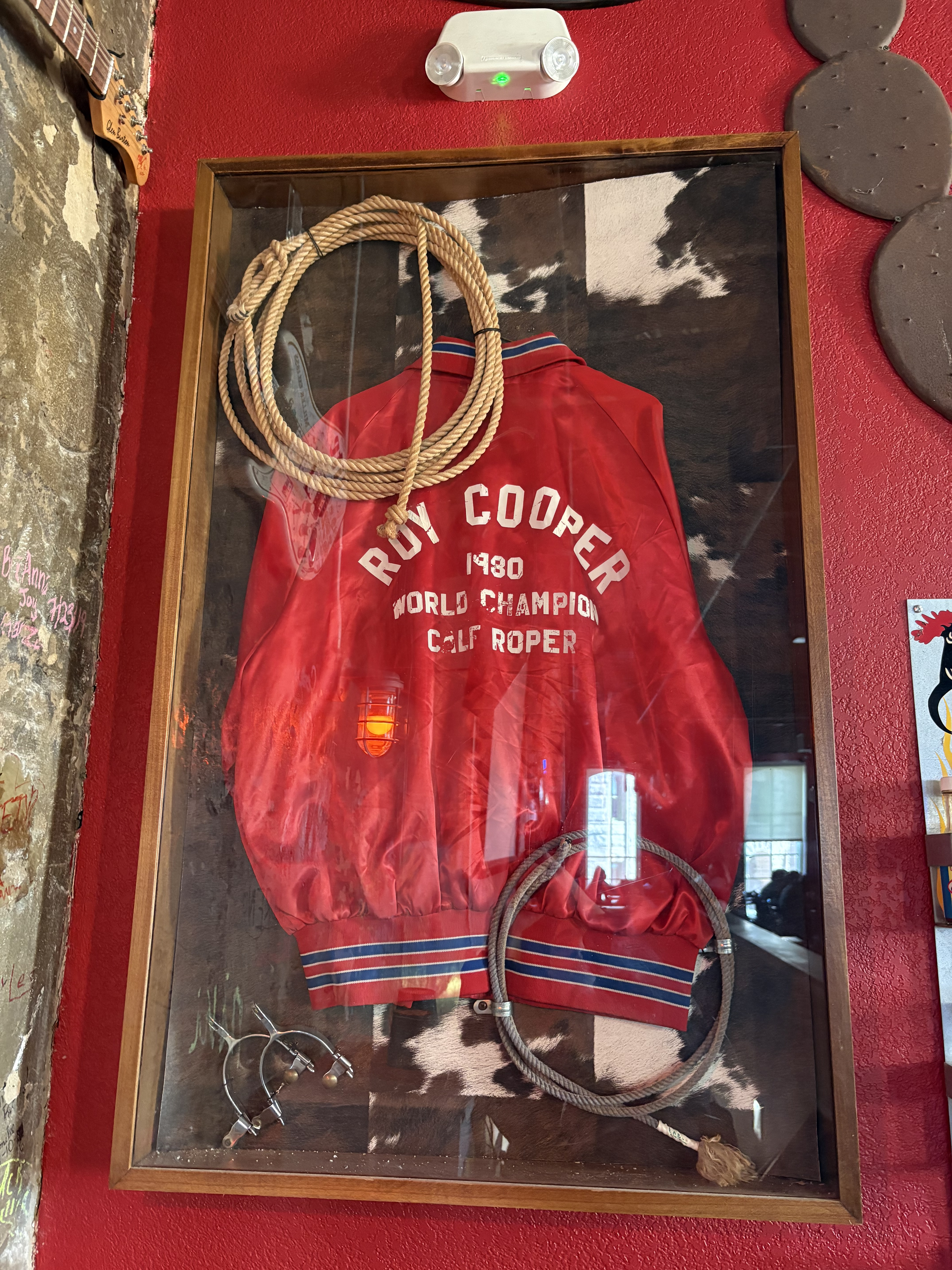
Cooper’s jacket, a pair of spurs, and ropes framed at the Roosters Roadhouse restaurant in Decatur, Texas

Inducted into the ProRodeo Hall of Fame in Colorado Springs, Colorado, in 1979, Cooper was part of the Hall's inaugural class of enshrinees in the category of Tie-Down Roping. For his skills in calf roping, he acquired the nickname of "Super Looper". The ProRodeo Hall of Fame calls Cooper "one of the most dominant ropers in the history of the sport." He was noted for his speed and quick hands, in addition to his rope-tossing ability. Calf roping champion Toots Mansfield said of Cooper that he had "perfected the art of roping and tying a calf about as far as it can be perfected." Fellow cowboy Joe Beaver praised Cooper's consistency and ability to avoid errors and said, "At his prime, he had no competition." Cooper and other members of his family founded the Cooper Rodeo Foundation, which aids children and young adults in rodeo.

== Awards ==
- 1976 PRCA Rookie of the Year
- 1976, 1980–1984 PRCA Calf-Roping World Champion
- 1983 PRCA Steer-Roping World Champion
- 1983 PRCA All-Around World Champion
- 1992 PRCA Texas Circuit Calf-Roping Champion

== Honors ==
- 1979 ProRodeo Hall of Fame
- 1983 National Rodeo Hall of Fame of the National Cowboy and Western Heritage Museum
- 1983 Western Heritage Museum & Lea County Cowboy Hall of Fame
- 2004 Cheyenne Frontier Days Hall of Fame
- Texas Cowboy Hall of Fame
- 2008 Texas Rodeo Hall of Fame
- 2009 Lea County Sports Hall of Fame
- 2010 Texas Rodeo Cowboy Hall of Fame
- 2010 Pendleton Round-Up and Happy Canyon Hall of Fame
- 2014 Oklahoma Sports Hall of Fame
- 2025 PBR Ty Murray Top Hand Award
