= Rich Skelton =

American team roper

Rich Skelton (born June 18, 1966) is an American former professional rodeo cowboy who specialized in team roping. He is an eight-time Professional Rodeo Cowboys Association (PRCA) team roping world champion, and is regarded as one of the most consistent team ropers of all time.

== Early life ==
Skelton was born in Fort Worth, Texas on June 18, 1966. However, he grew up mostly in Electra, Texas. When Skelton was growing up, he spent every free minute he had perfecting his roping skills. He attended Vernon College.

== Career ==
Skelton joined the PRCA in 1986 as a team roping heeler. His first partner in team roping was hall of famer Tee Woolman. In 1997, Woolman reduced his schedule, so Skelton teamed up with header hall of famer Speed Williams. Their partnership continued together for nine years. In that time, they tied or broke all existing team roping records.

Skelton competed in team roping, tie-down roping, and steer roping in his entire career; and also placed fourth in the all-around once in his career. He placed in the top 15 in the world standings going on seven years. He qualified for the National Finals Rodeo 22 times, in 1990, 1991, 1992, 1993, 1994, 1995, 1996, 1997, 1998, 1999, 2000, 2001, 2002, 2003, 2004, 2005, 2006, 2009, 2010, 2013, 2014, and 2015. He also qualified once for the National Finals Steer Roping in 2007. The highlight, though, are the eight consecutive team roping world championships which he and Williams earned in 1997, 1998, 1999, 2000, 2001, 2002, 2003, and 2004. Rich Skelton is regarded as one of the most consistent and competitive team ropers of all time. Skelton ended his career with nearly $3 million in earnings. When he retired after 2018, he was 44th in the World Standings.

=== Awards and qualifications ===
- 22-time NFR qualifier
- 8-time World Champion
- 1-time WNFR Average Champion
- 3-time NCFR Champion
- 12-time NCFR qualifier

=== Award-winning horses ===
Skelton has owned and ridden some of the most accomplished and skilled roping horses in the industry. Two of his favorites have won awards several times. Chili Dog, registered name Pets Ten, has won the AQHA/PRCA award twice, in 2004 and 2005. Roany, registered name Boons Smooth Val, won the AQHA/PRCA award four times, in 1997, 1998, 1998, and 2001. His horse "Z", registered name Mr. Moon Freckles, finished in a tie for third in 2006.

== Honors ==
- In 2006, Skelton was inducted into the Texas Cowboy Hall of Fame.
- In 2018, he was inducted into the ProRodeo Hall of Fame.
- In 2021, he was inducted into the Texas Rodeo Hall of Fame.
- In 2023, he was inducted into the Ellensburg Rodeo Hall of Fame.
- In 2025, he was inducted into the Texas Rodeo Cowboy Hall of Fame.

== Personal life ==
Skelton has since retired, and he enjoys golf and hunting. He, his wife Rhonda Smothers-Skelton, and his daughter reside in Llano, Texas. Both are barrel racers.
