= Billy Etbauer =

American bronc rider (born 1963)

Personal information
- Full name: Billy Etbauer
- Born: January 15, 1963 (age 63) Huron, South Dakota, United States
- Height: 5 ft 5 in (1.65 m) (2017)
- Weight: 140 lb (64 kg) (2017)

Sport
- Sport: Rodeo
- Event: Saddle bronc riding
- Turned pro: 1988

Achievements and titles
- Highest world ranking: 5x PRCA Saddle Bronc Riding World Champion

Billy Etbauer (born January 15, 1963) is an American former professional rodeo cowboy who specialized in saddle bronc riding. He competed in the Professional Rodeo Cowboys Association (PRCA) circuit along with his two brothers, Robert and Dan. Billy won the PRCA saddle bronc riding world championship five times.

== Background ==
Etbauer was born in Huron, South Dakota, on January 15, 1963, and now lives in Edmond, Oklahoma. The middle son of three boys, he traveled and competed with his brothers Robert, Dan, and friend, Craig Latham. Latham was often referred to as "the fourth Etbauer". His brother Robert won the PRCA saddle bronc riding world championship in 1990 and 1991.

He married his wife Hollie on April 2, 1994, and had three children, homeschooled by Hollie. He and his wife raise quarter horses in Oklahoma.

== Career ==
In 1989, in his second year as a professional on the PRCA, he qualified for the National Finals Rodeo (NFR). He qualified for the NFR 21 consecutive years, winning 51 rounds – a record for that forum.

He is known for winning the 10th round of the NFR at least 9 times. In 2005, he was a guest on the Late Show with David Letterman and spoke about the NFR. In 1992 he won $101,531 in 10 days at the finals. As of 2007 he had $2.7 million in PRCA earnings alone.

He won the World Saddle Bronc Riding Championship five times. He earned more than $1 million in his second championship season. He made a 93-point ride on Kesler Championship Rodeo's Cool Alley in 2003, which was an NFR record at the time. He tied his own record on the same horse a year later. That record-tying ride brought him the last of his five championship buckles (1992, 1996, 1999, 2000, 2004), a record surpassed only by Casey Tibbs and Dan Mortensen. He was 41 years old at the time, making him the "oldest roughstock world champion". Cool Alley was named the PRCA 2001 Bareback Bronc of the Year and the 2004 Saddle Bronc of the Year.

Like Trevor Brazile, Etbauer has transcended the $3 million mark in earnings. He was the first to reach that mark in one event. He finished his career with $3,015,377 in final earnings.

As a team, the three brothers and their friend are responsible for 52 NFR qualifications. This includes ten for Dan and nine for Latham. The Etbauers "dominated" the 1990s: they were the only trio of brothers to qualify for the NFR in the same roughstock event in the same year until the Wright brothers accomplished the same feat some 30 years later, but the Etbauers’ did it eight times. All three brothers were inducted into the Rodeo Hall of Fame. The ProRodeo Hall of Fame in Colorado Springs, Colorado, inducted Etbauer in 2012. His brother Robert is also a ProRodeo Hall of Fame inductee.

== Honors ==
- 2012 ProRodeo Hall of Fame
- 2013 Rodeo Hall of Fame of the National Cowboy and Western Heritage Museum
- 2015 South Dakota Sports Hall of Fame
- 2020 Cheyenne Frontier Days Hall of Fame

== Bibliography ==
- 2020 Media Guide | PRCA Awards (PDF). Professional Rodeo Cowboys Association.
