= Trevor Brazile =

American rodeo cowboy (born 1976)

Personal information
- Born: November 16, 1976 (age 49) Amarillo, Texas, U.S.
- Occupation: Rodeo cowboy
- Spouse: Shada Cooper (m. 2001)
- Children: 3

Sport
- Sport: Rodeo
- League: Professional Rodeo Cowboys Association
- Partner: Miles Baker
- Former partner(s): Rich Skelton; Patrick Smith
- Retired: 2018 (from full-time)

Trevor Brazile (born November 16, 1976) is a semi-retired American rodeo cowboy who competed in the Professional Rodeo Cowboys Association (PRCA) and partners with a cowboy named Miles Baker. He was inducted into the ProRodeo Hall of Fame in 2022. He holds the record for the most PRCA world championship titles with 26. He won his 26th title in 2020. He also holds the record for the most all-around cowboy world champion titles at 14, breaking the record of 7 titles held by Ty Murray; Murray's last earned was in 1998.

== Early life ==
Brazile was born in Amarillo, Texas, and says that "he wants to be remembered as a great cowboy".

== Career ==
Brazile won the all-around world championship in 2002, 2003, 2004 and 2006 through 2015, and in 2018. He won the tie-down roping world championship in 2007, 2009 and 2010. He won the team roping world championship in 2010. He won the steer roping world championship in 2006, 2007, 2011, 2013, 2014, 2015, 2019 and 2020. He won four National Finals Steer Roping (NFSR) Average titles in 2012, 2014, 2015, and 2020. He also won two National Finals Rodeo (NFR) Average titles. One was in team roping in 2008 and one was in tie-down roping in 2010.

Brazile won the most money during the Fourth of July week for the 2006 season with $24,894. He became the youngest PRCA cowboy and the seventh overall to cross the $2 million mark in career earnings. In 2006, he won six Team Roping titles with partner Rich Skelton. He also won the Wrangler ProRodeo Tour Round and average titles at the Ellensburg Rodeo. In 2007, he became first Triple Crown winner in 24 years, and just the tenth in history, by winning the all-around, tie-down roping and steer roping gold buckles. He broke his own single-season record with earnings of $425,115 and moved from seventh to third on the career earnings list. He won two team roping titles with partner Patrick Smith in Rounds 4 and 5 of Wrangler National Finals Rodeo, and a tie-down roping title in Round 7 of the event.

In 2008, he became the first PRCA cowboy to cross the $3 million mark in career earnings. He earned an all-around title at Caldwell Night Rodeo during the first round Ariat Playoffs. He also won six Team Roping Titles with partner Patrick Smith. In 2009, he tied for first place in Round 5 of tie-down roping, with a time of 7.1 seconds, and placed in three other rounds en route to clinching his second world championship in that event in three years and a record-tying seventy all-around gold buckle; placed in one round of the team roping with Patrick Smith. By earning his 11th world championship, Brazile moved into a tie for third place on the career list with Dean Oliver and Charmayne James." He won seven team roping titles with Patrick Smith.

In 2010, he and Smith won two team roping titles. In 2010, Brazile won his 8th all-around title, surpassing Murray's seven titles from 1998. Murray's titles were won all in roughstock events, as opposed to Brazile's timed-event wins, and he is still the youngest winner of the title. In 2013, Brazile won another all-around title and his total number of world titles moved to 19, breaking Guy Allen's record of 18 world championship titles. As of 2020, Brazile has 26 world titles, eight more than Allen, who is in second place with 18 titles, and Shoulders is in third place with 16 titles.

In 2015, he was named the NFR All-Around Cowboy Champion, and took first in Tie Down Roping Rounds 1 and 8, with times of 6.8 seconds and 6.5 seconds, respectively. In Round 8, he tied Cody Ohl's arena record. Brazile announced his retirement from full-time rodeo at the end of the 2018 NFR. In 2019, Brazile was on a reduced schedule as per his announcement at the end of the previous year's season, but still won the steer roping event this year and his 25th gold buckle. Brazile placed in all ten rounds of the PRCA National Finals Steer Roping (NFSR) in Mulvane, Kansas, the only competitor who did. He earned $56,707 at the NFSR. Part of that check was $27,347 for winning the NFSR Average title, making a 10-run time of 131.0 seconds. He won the championship with total earnings of $129,834. His total earnings at the NFSR was $60,989, which was the most of all the competitors.

=== National events ===
| Event | All-Around | Team Roping | Co-Champion | Tie-Down | Steer Roping | Ref(s) |
|---|---|---|---|---|---|---|
| Amarillo Tri-State Fair Pro Rodeo | 2007 | | | | 2006 | |
| Angelina Benefit Rodeo | 2010 | | | 2010 | | |
| Beef Empire Days PRCA Rodeo | 2006, 2008 | 2006 | | | | |
| Bell County PRCA Rodeo | 2009 | | 2006 | 2009 | | |
| Black Gold Pro Rodeo | 2008 | | | | | |
| Butterfield Stage Days Rodeo | 2010 | | | 2009 | 2008, 2010 | |
| Caldwell Night Rodeo | 2008, 2009 | | | 2008, 2009 | | |
| Canby Rodeo | 2008, 2009 | | 2006 | | | |
| Clark County Fair & Rodeo | 2006, 2010 | 2006, 2010 | | 2006, 2009 | | |
| Clovis Rodeo | | | 2009 | 2007 | | |
| Cody Stampede Rodeo | 2009 | | | | | |
| Coleman PRCA Rodeo | | | | | 2007 | |
| Colorado State Fair & Rodeo | 2006, 2009 | | | 2006 | | |
| Cowboy Capital of the World Pro Rodeo | 2008, 2009 | 2009 | | | 2008 | |
| Daines Ranch Rodeo | | 2009 | | | | |
| Days of '47 Rodeo | | 2006 | | | | |
| Deadwood Days of '76 Rodeo | 2006, 2007, 2008, 2009 | 2008 | | | 2008 | |
| Dodge City Roundup Rodeo | 2009 | 2009 | | | | |
| Dodge Texas Circuit Finals Rodeo | 2007 | | | | | |
| Eastland County ProRodeo | 2009 | | | 2009 | | |
| Ellensburg Rodeo | 2006, 2009 | | | | | |
| Farm City Pro Rodeo | 2009 | | | 2009 | | |
| Fort Bend County & Rodeo | 2009, 2010 | 2006 | | | 2010 | |
| Fort Worth Stock Show & Rodeo | 2010 | | | | | |
| Fourth of July Youth Celebration and PRCA Pro Rodeo | | | | 2006 | | |
| Glen Rose PRCA Rodeo | 2008 | 2008 | | | | |
| Grand National Rodeo | 2007, 2008 | | | 2007 | | |
| Greeley Stampede | | 2009 | | | | |
| Guy Weadick Memorial Rodeo | | | | 2009 | | |
| Guymon Pioneer Days Rodeo | 2008 | | | 2010 | | |
| Heartland ProRodeo Steer Roping Championships | | | | | 2009 | |
| Horse Heaven Roundup | 2008 | 2008 | | 2006 | | |
| Independence Stampede | | 2009 | | | | |
| Inter-State Rodeo | | | | | 2008 | |
| Jawhawker Roundup | | | | | 2007 | |
| Justin Boots Championships | | | | 2009 | | |
| Kansas' Biggest Rodeo | 2009 | | | 2009 | | |
| Kitsap Fair and Stampede | | | | 2009 | 2009 | |
| La Fiesta de los Vaqueros | | | | 2006, 2007, 2008 | | |
| Laughlin River Stampede | 2006 | | | | | |
| Lawton Rangers Rodeo | 2008, 2009 | | | 2007 | | |
| Lea County Fair & Rodeo | 2006, 2008, 2009 | | | | | |
| Lewiston Round-Up | 2006 | 2006 | | 2006 | 2006, 2009 | |
| Livermore Rodeo | 2009 | | | | | |
| Livingston Roundup | | | | 2008 | | |
| Lonestar Stampede | 2008 | | | | | |
| Magic Valley Stampede | | | | 2009 | | |
| Matagorda Fair & Rodeo | | | | | 2009 | |
| Molalla Buckeroo | 2008 | | | 2009 | | |
| Moses Lake Roundup | | 2006 | | | | |
| National Western Stock Show | 2010 | | | 2010 | | |
| New Mexico State Fair Rodeo | 2007 | | | | | |
| Northeast Texas Stampede PRCA Rodeo | | | | | 2006 | |
| Oakdale Saddle Club Rodeo | 2010 | 2010 | | 2010 | | |
| Ogden Pioneer Days Rodeo | 2007, 2009 | 2009 | | | | |
| Parker County Frontier Days Pro Rodeo | 2006 | | | | 2006 | |
| Pioneer Days Rodeo | 2007 | | 2007 | 2007 | | |
| Rancho Mission Viejo Rodeo | 2008 | 2008 | | | | |
| Red Bluff Round-Up | | | 2006 | | | |
| Redding Rodeo | 2008 | | | 2008 | | |
| Rodeo Austin | | | | 2006 | | |
| Rodeo de Santa Fe | 2009 | | | | | |
| Rodeo Houston | | | | 2006 | | |
| Rodeo Killeen | 2007 | | | | | |
| San Angelo Stock Show & Rodeo | 2009 | | | | 2007 | |
| San Antonio Stock Show & Rodeo | | | | 2010 | | |
| SandHills Stock Show & Rodeo | 2008 | | | | | |
| Sikeston Jaycee Bootheel Rodeo | 2007, 2009 | | | | | |
| Snake River Stampede | 2007 | | | 2007, 2009 | | |
| Sonora Outlaw Pro Rodeo | 2007 | | 2007 | | | |
| Southern Oklahoma Stampede PRCA Rodeo | | | | | 2006 | |
| Southwestern International PRCA Rodeo | 2009 | | | | | |
| St. Paul Rodeo | 2008 | | | 2008 | | |
| Star of Texas Fair & Rodeo | 2008 | | | | | |
| Walker County Fair & Rodeo | 2007, 2009, 2010 | | | 2006, 2008 | | |
| West of the Texas Rodeo | | | | 2006 | | |
| West of the Pecos Rodeo | 2006, 2007 | | | | 2006 | |
| Wild Bill Hickok Rodeo | 2009 | | | | | |
| Wild Wild West Pro Rodeo | 2009 | 2009 | | 2009 | 2009 | |
| Will Rogers Stampede | 2006, 2008, 2009 | 2008 | | | 2009 | |
| World's Oldest Rodeo | 2006, 2009 | | | 2008 | | |
| Wrangler National Finals Rodeo | 2007 | 2007 | | 2007 | | |
| Wyoming State Fair & Rodeo | | | | | 2006 | |
| YMBL Championship Rodeo | 2008 | 2008 | 2008 | 2008 | | |

== Honors ==
- 2002 Rodeo Hall of Fame of the National Cowboy and Western Heritage Museum
- 2008 Texas Cowboy Hall of Fame
- 2012 Texas Trail of Fame
- 2012 Ellensburg Rodeo Hall of Fame
- 2016 Texas Sports Hall of Fame
- 2018 Cheyenne Frontier Days Hall of Fame
- 2018 PBR Ty Murray Top Hand Award
- 2019 Pendleton Round-Up and Happy Canyon Hall of Fame
- 2022 Texas Rodeo Cowboy Hall of Fame
- 2022 ProRodeo Hall of Fame
- 2024 Ben Johnson Memorial Award of the National Cowboy and Western Heritage Museum

== Personal life ==
Brazile has been married since 2001 to Shada Cooper, the stepdaughter of ProRodeo Hall of Fame cowboy, Roy Cooper, who mentored Brazile early in his rodeo career. They live in Decatur, Texas, with their three children.
