= Dan Taylor (rodeo) =

American rodeo cowboy

Dan Collins Taylor
- Born: September 2, 1923; Coleman, Texas, US
- Died: November 3, 2010 (aged 87); Doole, Texas
- Occupations: Rodeo performer, chute boss, and promoter
- Spouse: Berva Dawn Sorensen Taylor (married 1952–2010, his death)
- Children: Three daughters Four grandchildren

Dan Collins Taylor (September 2, 1923 – November 3, 2010) was an American cowboy, rodeo performer, and promoter.

== Background ==
Taylor was born on September 2, 1923, in Coleman near Abilene in Coleman County, Texas in central Texas. While Dan was still a baby, his family moved to Doole, Texas. His parents were third-generation ranchers. Taylor graduated from high school in 1941.

Taylor was two years old when he started learning to ride horses. His first horse was named Billy, a streak-faced bay. At least five years old, he started learning roping because, "I wanted to and I liked it". At eight years old, he was considered a cowboy. At 15 years old, he started competing in rodeo.

== Rodeo career ==
In 1941, he joined the Cowboy Turtles Association (CTA). The organization was so new, he was issued card No. 64. He started competed in calf roping in professional rodeo. In 1942, at age 18, he was the youngest professional roper in the world. The CTA was renamed to the Rodeo Cowboys Association (RCA) in 1947. In 1975, the RCA was renamed the Professional Rodeo Cowboys Association (PRCA).

=== Calf roper ===
In 1942, at age 20, Taylor competed in his first Cheyenne Frontier Days rodeo in Cheyenne, Wyoming. In 1950, he finished third in the world calf roping competition. In 1951, he ranked fourth in world competition.

Taylor spent at least 25 years performing as a calf and team roper. He traveled the country. He made 14 stops in New York City that included Madison Square Garden. There, he not only roped but acted as chute boss. During one of those stops in New York City, a photographer named Robert Frank captured a photograph of Taylor. The photograph is now historic and is on display at the Smithsonian Institution in Washington, DC. The others in the rodeo arena dubbed him "Dooley Dan" when he became well known and successful. He and his powerful horse Red Bird won many competitions together.

In competition, Taylor won tie-down roping titles at San Antonio, Texas; Boston, Massachusetts; Ellensburg, Washington; Nampa, Idaho (the Snake River Stampede); Ogden and Salt Lake City, Utah. He has also won at Fort Madison, Iowa; Filer, Nampa, and Pocatello, Idaho; Burwell, Nebraska; Livingston, Montana; Belle Fourche, South Dakota; and Monte Vista, Colorado.

=== Chute boss ===
As chute boss at Cheyenne Frontier Days in Chute 9, Taylor "runs a tight ship in the timed chutes" says Tom Hines, one of the staff. In fact, "Taylor Time" is known as five minutes early". When he says it starts at 7 a.m., it's going to start at 6:55", Hines says. "I've never seen him late for anything". Hall of fame roper Guy Allen confirmed it. Allen says Taylor "isn't afraid to lay down the law over his chutes". "Sometimes it takes a guy who doesn't mind getting down and butting heads", he said "He'll tell you to get out of the way if you're in the way". Taylor is from a time when there were't computers to do things. If the computers ever bugged out, there are perhaps 2 to 3 guys who could do the job of drawing the cattle by hand.

He was the timed-event chute boss for the National Finals Rodeo (NFR) for 11 years (1965–1973 and 1978–1979) when that competition was held in Oklahoma City, Oklahoma, prior to its move to Las Vegas, Nevada. He was the chute boss for 15 years at the National Finals Steer Roping (NFSR) at the Lazy E Arena in Guthrie, Oklahoma.

In 1948, Taylor started working Chute 9 at Cheyenne Frontier Days. In 1961, he became the Chute 9 Boss. He was involved in 64 rodeos at Frontier Days. Taylor was the chute 9 boss for 49 years from 1961 - 2009. He was also associated with the "Daddy of 'em All" as a chute boss, contestant, and judge from 1945 to 2009.

Taylor was also the timed-event chute boss at many other rodeos, such as Houston, Texas; San Antonio, Texas; Fort Worth, Texas; and Denver, Colorado; as well as some independent steer ropings for 22 years at San Angelo, Texas.

=== Management ===
From 1954 to 1956, Taylor was the RCA Calf Roping Director. From 1986-1987 he was the President of the PRCA.

== Death and legacy ==
Taylor, age 87, died on November 3, 2010, in his residence in Doole, Texas. There was a tribute in his honor at Cheyenne Frontier Days the summer after his death. Taylor was known to many as "The Master Chute Boss".

At the 2011 Cheyenne Frontier Days, which always takes place the last two full weeks of July, his associates honored Taylor in a special ceremony. It had been nearly 10 months since his death. After rodeo slack "a time, usually late at night or early in the morning, other than during the performance when the “extra” contestants compete in the rodeo" was over that morning, the ceremony was held where friends gave speeches and showed a PowerPoint presentation focused on his life.

Shirley Churchill of Cheyenne, Wyoming, a long-time friend of Taylor, said that she did not "know of anyone who has been or will probably ever be a better advocate of Cheyenne Frontier Days than Dan Taylor. He could make a decision without worrying what someone else thought. Dan was a phenomenon to run Chute 9 because his reputation was never for sale". Tom Hines, another Taylor friend, described him as a "cowboy's cowboy". Stock contractor Harry Vold, said that Taylor "lived and breathed Cheyenne Frontier Days ... If ever there was a person who dedicated his life to Chute Number 9 at Cheyenne it was Dan Taylor".

== Honors ==
- In 1967, Taylor was made an honorary heel by Cheyenne Frontier Days.
- In 1986, he was awarded a special CFD belt buckle for 25 years as the timed events chute boss.
- In 1996, at the 100 Year Anniversary of CFD, he was honored for his more than 50 years as Chute 9 Boss; the Senior Steer Ropers named him "The Master Chute Boss."
- In 2005, Taylor and his wife, Berva Dawn Sorensen, were inducted into the Texas Rodeo Cowboy Hall of Fame in the Fort Worth Stockyards in Fort Worth, Texas.
- In 2006, Taylor was inducted into the Rodeo Hall of Fame of the National Cowboy and Western Heritage Museum in Oklahoma City, Oklahoma, formerly known as the National Cowboy Hall of Fame. Also in 2006, Taylor was inducted into the Cheyenne Frontier Days Hall of Fame.
- Taylor was inducted into the Dublin Rodeo Heritage Museum in Dublin, Texas.

== Personal ==
In 1952, Dan married Berva Dawn Sorensen. Sorenson's father was the stock contractor, J.C. (Doc) Sorenson, from Camas, Idaho. Taylor lived in Doole, Texas, where he raised Brangus cattle. The Taylors had three daughters, three granddaughters and one grandson, and four great-grandchildren.

== Biography ==
- Porter, William H. (December 1954). "Dooley Dan". Vol. 41. The Cattleman. pp. 26, 46.
