= Dan Mortensen =

American rodeo cowboy

- Born: December 16, 1968 (age 56); Billings, Montana, United States

Daniel Earl Mortensen (born December 16, 1968) is an American former professional rodeo cowboy who specialized in saddle bronc riding. He competed in the Professional Rodeo Cowboys Association (PRCA) and won seven world championships; six in saddle bronc riding and one all-around.

== Early life ==
Mortensen was born in Billings, Montana, to Sheryl and Don "Mort" Mortensen. He is the youngest of four, having three sisters, Dawn, Denise and Darcy. His father, Mort, was an electrician and his mother, Sheryl, has worked as a teaching assistant at the Lockwood Schools for over twenty-five years.

Mortensen developed a passion for rodeo at and early age and won his first team roping competition at the age of 6. By the age of 12 he had progressed through steer (age 10) up to riding bulls at the local youth rodeos.

== Education ==
Mortensen attended Lockwood primary, elementary and junior high schools (k-9) from 1974 through 1984, and Billings Senior High (10-12) from 1985 through 1987. While attending Billings Senior High, he was an active member of the Future Farmers of America and competed in the Montana high school rodeo circuit.

During his Sophomore and Junior years at BSHS, Mortensen won the Montana High School bull riding championship. Before graduating in 1987, he went on to win the Montana High School saddle bronc championship and placed 2nd in the bull riding competition.

After graduation, Mortensen accepted a scholarship to attend Northwest College in Powell, Wyoming. He spent two years on the Trapper rodeo team where he finished 2nd in the saddle bronc category to fellow future rodeo legend Ty Murray in both the College National Finals Rodeo and the final national standings for 1989. Mortensen then accepted a scholarship to Montana State University - Bozeman in Bozeman, Montana.

Mortensen joined the PRCA in 1990. Placing 15th in the standings, Mortensen was awarded as the Rookie of the Year.

He followed up his rookie year in the PRCA by winning the National Intercollegiate saddle bronc championship.

In 1992, Mortensen graduated from MSU-Bozeman with honors, earning a degree in agri-business and economics. The university later awarded him with its most prestigious award, The Blue and Gold Award, for his great lifetime service bringing international distinction to Montana State University - Bozeman.

== Career ==
Three years after joining the PRCA, Mortensen competed at the National Finals Rodeo (NFR) and won the first of his six saddle bronc riding world championships. He went on to win the saddle bronc titles in 1994, 1995, 1997, 1998 and 2003. His six titles ties him for most all time with the legendary cowboy Casey Tibbs.

At the 1997 NFR, Mortensen also won the all-around world champion title.

During his 1998 NFR run for the saddle bronc championship, Mortensen became the first rider in PRCA history to win over $200,000 in a single event. The following year, Sports Illustrated named Mortensen one of Montana's top ten athletes of the century.

Mortensen claimed another first in rodeo history at the 2003 Pendleton Round-Up rodeo in Pendleton, Oregon, by becoming the first rough stock rider to exceed $2 million in career earnings.

Rodeo was included as a cultural event at the 2002 Winter Olympics in Salt Lake City, Utah. Mortensen participated on the U.S. team in competition against the Canadian team. He took home the bronze medal for the competition.

The Montana Pro Rodeo Hall of Fame honored Mortensen in October 2002 with the unveiling of an 18' statue of him riding the bronc Tee Box, as the center piece of their Wall of Fame monument at the Metra Park in Billings, Montana. The sculpture was the last work of western artist and fellow Montanan, R.F. Rains.

Montana State University - Bozeman inducted Mortensen into its Athletics Hall of Fame on September 17, 2004, at a ceremony in Bozeman.

At a ceremony in Colorado Springs, Colorado, on July 9, 2009, Mortensen was inducted into the ProRodeo Hall of Fame.

Mortensen officially retired from rodeo November 2008 at the age of 39.

Mortensen now coaches the Northwest College Rodeo Team in Powell, Wyoming, where he attended college for his first two years of schooling.

== Honors ==
- 1997 Rodeo Hall of Fame of the National Cowboy and Western Heritage Museum
- 2001 Calgary Stampede Guy Weadick Award
- 2004 MSU-Bozeman - Athletics Hall of Fame
- 2009 ProRodeo Hall of Fame
- 2015 Montana Pro Rodeo Hall and Wall of Fame
- 2023 Ellensburg Rodeo Hall of Fame
