= Monty "Hawkeye" Henson =

American saddle bronc rider

Monty Henson, sometimes known as Hawkeye Henson (born October 22, 1953), is an American former professional rodeo cowboy who specialized in saddle bronc riding. He competed in the Professional Rodeo Cowboys Association (PRCA), and won three PRCA saddle bronc riding world championships.

Henson was born in Farmersville near Dallas, Texas. He grew up with childhood friend, PRCA bull riding champion, and fellow hall of famer Don Gay. During his rodeo career, Henson won three world titles in 1975, 1976, and again in 1982 at the National Finals Rodeo (NFR). He won the average at the NFR four times, and qualified for the NFR 14 times. He won or placed at almost every major rodeo in the United States as well going to rodeos in Europe and Japan.

Henson was quoted as saying, "I'm a cowboy. That's the best thing anybody could say about me. If I could have that on my tombstone – Here lies Hawkeye, a cowboy – then I can die a happy man." In 1994, he was inducted in the ProRodeo Hall of Fame in Colorado Springs, Colorado. In 2003, he was inducted into the Texas Cowboy Hall of Fame located in the Fort Worth Stockyards in Fort Worth, Texas. The museum features many of his personal items from his rodeo career.

Henson has appeared in numerous television programs and films. In 2004, he was cast as Hawkeye in four episodes of the HBO series Deadwood alongside Ian McShane, Timothy Olyphant, and Molly Parker. He is also a country music entertainer and rodeo promoter.

== Honors ==
- 1983 Calgary Stampede Guy Weadick Award
- 1994 ProRodeo Hall of Fame
- 2003 Cowboy Capital Walk of Fame
- 2003 Texas Cowboy Hall of Fame
- 2004 Texas Rodeo Cowboy Hall of Fame
- 2006 Cheyenne Frontier Days Hall of Fame
