= Mulvane =

Mulvane may refer to:

- Mulvane, Kansas, a city in Sedgwick and Sumner Counties, Kansas
- Mulvane, West Virginia, a community in Fayette County, West Virginia
