= Eva Scofield =

Professional rodeo photographer

Eva Scofield is a longtime professional rodeo photographer and former U.S. Navy captain who served as an official photographer for the Professional Rodeo Cowboys Association (PRCA). She is known for her extensive coverage of western rodeos.

== Early life and education ==
Scofield was born on the East Coast, but her family began moving around when she was nine months old. Her family eventually settled in Sheridan, Wyoming.

She graduated in 1981 from California State Polytechnic University with a bachelors degree in chemical engineering.

== Career ==
Scofield originally worked as a chemical engineer in the early 1980s.

Scofield joined the U.S. Navy in 1985 and was commissioned an ensign through a program called Aviation Officer Candidate School, which served as inspiration for the movie, An Officer and a Gentleman.

She eventually rose to be a U.S. Navy captain. While stationed in Germany, she participated in German rodeos, competing in wild horse racing, breakaway roping, barrel racing and saddle bronc riding.

While competing in Germany, she also began photographing her colleagues.

She then began photographing rodeos in the U.S., including Cheyenne Frontier Days starting in 1998, eventually parlaying her experience into a part-time photography role with the PRCA in 2002. Scofield would take leave from the military to shoot the rodeos season in the United States.

She served in active duty until 2015, but continued photography after leaving the military. She retired as a PRCA photographer in 2026.

== Honors ==
Scofield won the 2012 PRCA media award. She was also honored at the 2024 National Finals Rodeo for her contributions to the PRCA rodeo.
