= Quail Dobbs =

American rodeo clown

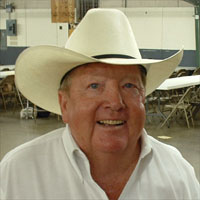
- Born: Marvin Dobbs; August 27, 1941; Albany, Texas, US
- Died: January 15, 2014 (aged 72); Coahoma, Texas, US

Marvin "Quail" Dobbs (August 27, 1941 – January 15, 2014) was an American rodeo clown and performer.

Dobbs was born in Albany, Texas. His parents were Acie and Avis Dobbs, and his childhood was marked by many moves. In the late 1950s, the family moved to Colorado City. In 1964, Dobbs married a high school classmate named Judy, and the couple had two children, Stephanie and Coley. In 1972, he made his acting debut as a rodeo clown in the movie J. W. Coop.

Dobbs began his career in rodeo by riding bulls and bareback horses, and in 1962 began work as a barrelman. During his career, he performed in the Professional Rodeo Cowboys Association (PRCA) circuit. He was named PRCA Clown of the Year twice in 1978 and 1988 and the Coors Man in the Can (the barrelman inside the barrel in the arena during the bull riding at the National Finals Rodeo) four times in 1985, 1986, 1990 and 1993. He was one of only three men to work as both a bullfighter and barrelman at the National Finals Rodeo, and also worked seven times as a barrelman for the Wrangler Bullfighting Tour Finals. He also worked 28 times at the Cheyenne Frontier Days in Wyoming, and the 1998 Frontier Days marked Dobbs' last appearance in professional rodeo.

After his retirement, Dobbs became justice of the peace in Coahoma, Texas; a position he held until 2013. Dobbs died on January 15, 2014, in Coahoma.

== Honors ==
- 2002 Pro Rodeo Hall of Fame
- 2002 Texas Rodeo Cowboy Hall of Fame
- 2003 Texas Cowboy Hall of Fame
- 2003 Cheyenne Frontier Days Hall of Fame
- 2004 Texas Rodeo Hall of Fame
- 2011 Texas Trail of Fame
- 2020 Original Wrangler Bullfights Hall of Fame
- 2021 Bull Riding Hall of Fame
