= Guy Allen =

American steer roper

Personal information
- Born: September 5, 1958 (age 67) Coushatta, Louisiana, U.S.
- Height: 6 ft 2 in (1.88 m) (2018)
- Weight: 205 lb (93 kg) (2018)

Sport
- Sport: Rodeo
- Event(s): Steer roping, team roping
- Turned pro: 1976

Achievements and titles
- Highest world ranking: 18x PRCA Steer Roping World Champion

Guy Allen (born September 5, 1958) is an American ProRodeo Hall of Fame cowboy and an 18-time steer roping world champion. He competes in rodeos sanctioned by the Professional Rodeo Cowboys Association (PRCA). He won the world title for the steer roping event 18 times when competing at the National Finals Steer Roping (NFSR) and also won the National Finals Rodeo (NFR) Average title five times. He had won the title 11 times in a row when Buster Record broke his streak. Allen is also inducted into eight rodeo halls of fame.

== Early life ==
Guy Allen was born on September 5, 1958, in Coushatta, Louisiana, to a ranching family. He graduated from Santa Anna High School. He started rodeo in 1961. His father and brother are also PRCA members and the three all qualified together for the NFSR in 1983, the first time a father and two sons had qualified for the event at the same time.

== Career ==
Allen competes on the PRCA rodeo circuit. He most recently competed in 2016. At age seven, Allen traveled to rodeos with his father to compete. At age 13, he had become an adept steer roper. In 1976, at age 16, he joined the PRCA. He filled his permit within a month of joining. "Filling a permit" is when a contestant fulfills the requirements to become a PRCA card holder, which includes purchasing a permit and earning a minimum dollar amount at sanctioned rodeos. As a card holder, a contestant is allowed to compete in finals events and gain official ranking. At age 19, he competed in his first NFSR and won his first world title. He also competes in team roping.

In 2000, in Duncan, Oklahoma, Allen set a new world record for the fastest steer roping time at 7.9 seconds. He held the record until 2012 when, on June 2, Cody Scheck set a new world record with a 7.7-second run at the Old Fort Days Rodeo in Fort Smith, Arkansas.

A steer roper by the name of Buster Record had been trying to win his first world record for ten years and break Allen's consecutive record streak. Allen had reached a streak of 11 straight titles by that time approaching the 2002 NFSR. Record finished the regular season ahead of Allen by $205, which had not been achieved in 13 years. Record ended Allen's world title streak at 11 consecutive titles with an all out performance at the 2002 NFSR. Record's winning earnings at the NFSR at the Amarillo National Center in Amarillo, Texas, were $56,575. He was well ahead of Trevor Brazile who earned $47,871 for No. 2 and Allen at No. 3 with $47,789.

In 1959, Jim Shoulders set a record of 16 world championships. This record stood until Allen matched the record in 2001 after winning his 16th steer roping title. Two years later in 2003, Allen broke Shoulder's record after winning a 17th title. He won his 18th and final title to date in 2004. In 2013, Trevor Brazile won another all-around title and his total number of world titles moved to 19 world titles. This broke Allen's record of 18 world titles. As of 2019, Brazile has 25 world titles, seven more than Allen, who is in second place with 18 titles, and Shoulders is in third place with 16 titles.

=== Summary ===
Allen won the world title for the steer roping event 18 times in 1977, 1980, 1982, 1984, 1989, 1991–2001, and 2003, 2004 when competing at the NFSR at each season's end. He won 11 consecutive titles from 1991 to 2001; the streak was broken by Buster Record in 2002. Allen also won five NFR Average titles in 1989, 1991, 1997, 2000, and 2004. He set the record for world's fastest steer roping speed at 7.9 seconds in 2000, which lasted until 2012. Allen holds the record for the titles in a single event at 18 titles as well as the most steer roping titles. He also holds the most consecutive steer roping titles at 11.

=== Award-winning horses ===
Annually, the American Quarter Horse Association (AQHA) and the PRCA selects the best three timed-event horses in several categories: steer wrestling, team roping, tie-down roping, steer roping, and barrel roping in the PRCA. Owners are awarded a bonus and a bronze. Voting is conducted by the top PRCA timed-event contestants. In his career, Allen has owned two horses who have been awarded AQHA/PRCA Horse of the Year in Steer Roping. In 1997, Jack Bart Tender (nicknamed Bullet) was the winner. In 1999–2001 and 2004, Two D Ole Man (nicknamed Jeremiah) was the winner. Jeremiah was retired and was spending his retirement on Mack Alitizer's Ranch in Del Rio, Texas. On September 5, 2012, Jeremiah, a brown gelding, who was 25 years old, died.

== Honors ==
- 1996 ProRodeo Hall of Fame
- 2002 Pendleton Round-Up and Happy Canyon Hall of Fame
- 2003 Texas Cowboy Hall of Fame
- 2006 Texas Rodeo Hall of Fame
- 2008 Ellensburg Rodeo Hall of Fame
- 2008 Cheyenne Frontier Days Hall of Fame
- 2009 Texas Rodeo Cowboy Hall of Fame
- 2015 Western Heritage Museum & Lea County Cowboy Hall of Fame
- 2021 PBR Ty Murray Top Hand Award
- 2022 Rodeo Hall of Fame of the National Cowboy & Western Heritage Museum

== Personal life ==
Allen lives in Santa Anna, Texas. He has two daughters. His two favorite pastimes are golf and ranching. The Kansas City Chiefs are his favorite sports team. His favorite rodeo performer is Sonny Davis. He was nicknamed "Legend" by Tee Woolman, a companion steer roper and team roper, and other peers.
