= Cheyenne Frontier Days Old West Museum =

Museum in Cheyenne, Wyoming

Coordinates: 41°09′29″N 104°50′03″W

- Established: 1978
- Location: Cheyenne, Wyoming
- Website: www.oldwestmuseum.org

The Cheyenne Frontier Days Old West Museum is located in Cheyenne, Wyoming, United States. The museum was founded in 1978. It is a 501(c)(3) non-profit organization, dedicated to interpreting, conserving and exhibiting the history and material culture of Cheyenne, Cheyenne Frontier Days, the State of Wyoming and the American West. The museum features the Cheyenne Frontier Days Hall of Fame. Permanent exhibits include Western horse-drawn carriages and wagons, the history and memorabilia of Cheyenne Frontier Days rodeo celebration, local history of Cheyenne, pioneer artifacts and clothing, and Western and folk art. The Cheyenne Frontier Days Old West Museum is home to the "World’s Largest Outdoor Rodeo and Western Celebration" with its permanent exhibit on the history of Cheyenne Frontier Days.

Clayton Danks, the winner of three CFD competitions prior to 1910, is the model cowboy on the horse Steamboat on the Wyoming trademark, the Bucking Horse and Rider. The saddle which Danks won in CFD competition in 1907 was donated by his surviving family members to the museum in September 2013.

Shirley E. Flynn, director of the museum from 1987 to 1991, penned the history of the Frontier Days celebration in her 1996 book Let's Go! Let's Show! Let's Rodeo! The History of Cheyenne Frontier Days.

== Hall of Fame ==
The Hall of Fame inducts individuals, livestock, and organizations who helped and continue to maintain the rodeo widely known as "The Daddy of 'em All." Everyone voted into the hall of fame "represents the competitive and cooperative spirit that has remained the hallmark of Cheyenne Frontier Days since 1897."

== Hall of Fame Inductees ==
Class of 2020

- Scott Binning
- Monte Blue
- Del Peterson
- Kristie Peterson
- The Schrader Family
- Tom Watson
- French Flash “Bozo” Hawk

Class of 2019

- Terry “Buffie” Bottorff
- Valerie Cegelski-McLeod
- Billy Etbauer
- Painted Valley
- Bud Racicky
- Bob Weaver
- WHEELS

Class of 2018

- Trevor Brazile
- David Johansen
- Jim Lynch
- David “Sammy” McInerney
- O.D. “Jack” Mueller
- J.D. Yates

Class of 2017

- Darrell Barron
- Ote Berry
- Helen Bowen
- Jerry Carter
- Rod Hottle
- James “Jim” Johnson

Class of 2016

- Teresa Jordan
- Ann King
- Jim Mueller
- Duane “Bubba” Roedocker
- Billy Ward
- Cynthia Lummis

Class of 2015

- Spiro “Sam” Contos
- W.E. Dinneen Family
- Reva Gray
- Kay Jessen
- Ty Murray
- Bob Romer
- Dr. Norman Swanson

Class of 2014

- Dr. Frank Barrett
- CFD Western Art Show Committee 1981–2013
- Elizabeth “Liz” Escobedo
- Harrison Halligan
- Ken McCann
- Hank Thompson

Class of 2013

- Albert “Whitey” Christensen
- Tucker Fagan
- Vianna Gurney
- Dick Sherman
- Jeremy Sparks
- Earl Vandehei Family
- The HEELS of Cheyenne Frontier Days

Class of 2012

- Kiwanis Club of Cheyenne
- Marvin Leff
- Romeo Entertainment Group
- James A. Storey Jr.
- Randy Wagner
- William McKinley Wilkinson
- D.R. Whitaker Ranch Families

Class of 2011

- Chuck Baley
- Ray Boeshart
- Ralph Buell
- Carol Farthing
- Margaret Irwin
- Dr. Donald Kougl
- Enid Lummis & Family
- Montie Montana
- William “Obie” Obermeier
- Dick Pickett
- Don Stanfield

Class of 2010

- Tom Bauman
- Garth Brooks
- Floyd Carroll
- Brad Churchill
- Louise Cole
- April & T.V. Jones
- Ronda Mahan
- John Morris
- Kent Rutledge

Class of 2009

- Hadley Barrett
- Buddy Bensmiller
- Shirley Churchill
- Floyd & Diane Humphrey
- Charles “Sharkey” Irwin
- Dean Oliver
- Ned Murray
- Phil Van Horn

Class of 2008

- Guy Allen
- Lynn Beutler
- Crooked Nose
- Clayton Danks
- Irwin Family
- Jack Miller
- W.J. “Jack” Ryan, DDS
- Ace Tyrrell
- Corky Warren
- Senior Steer Ropers Association

Class of 2007

- Willits A. Brewster
- Roy Clark
- Greater Cheyenne Chamber of Commerce
- Buddy Lytle
- John “Jack” Mabee
- Ikua Purdy
- Orville Strandquist
- Tillard Family

Class of 2006

- Bertha Kaepernick Blanchett
- Freckles Brown
- Gene Bryan
- Lou Domenico
- Red Fenwick
- Jim Hearne
- Monty "Hawkeye" Henson
- Linderman Family
- George Michael
- Dr. J.S. Palen
- Tom Powers
- Professional Rodeo Cowboys Association
- Dan Taylor
- Sonny Worrell

Class of 2005

- Walter J. “Buzz” Bradley
- Charles D. Carey Jr.
- The Denver Post
- Jerry Jessen
- Ben Johnson Sr.
- Harry Knight
- Don McLaughlin
- Ruby Mercer
- Jim Powers
- Powers Family
- Sally Rand
- Warren Richardson
- Jim Tescher
- Lois Wade
- Mary Weppner
- Fred Whitfield

Class of 2004

- Joe Alexander
- Mary Elizabeth Carpender
- Roy Cooper
- Bill Dubois
- F.E. Warren Air Force Base
- Shirley Flynn
- Rudy Hofmann
- Calvin Jumping Bull
- Dr. Jack Ketcham
- Fred Lowry
- Leonard Mayer
- Merritt Family
- Mr. T
- Wick Peth
- Dan Rees
- Ike Rude
- Joseph Stimson
- George Strait
- Earl Thode
- Lorena Trickey

Class of 2003

- John Bell
- George Bruegman
- Paul Bruegman
- Ora N. “Dutch” Buckles
- Johnny Cash
- John Cole
- E.O. Davis
- Quail Dobbs
- Lane Frost
- Turk Greenough
- Robert “Bob” Hanesworth
- Tuff Hedeman
- C.W. “Charlie” Hirsig
- Hirsig Family
- Chris LeDoux
- Clark McEntire
- Midnight
- Norma Bell Morris
- Mel Potter
- Everett Shaw
- USAF Thunderbirds
- James “J.D” Vandewark
- Harry Vold
- Duane Von Krosigk
- Shoat Webster

Class of 2002

- Princess Blue Water
- Margaret Boice
- Dazee Bristol
- T. Joe Cahill
- Charlie Daniels
- Shawn Davis
- Marietta Dinneen
- Verne Elliott
- Gus Fleischli
- C.B. Irwin
- Arlene Kensinger
- Don Kensinger
- Tad Lucas
- Larry Mahan
- Ed McCarty
- Reba McEntire
- Chuck Parkison
- Wilbur Plaugher
- Jim Shoulders
- Colonel E.A. Slack
- Steamboat
- Edward T. Storey
- Mabel Strickland
- Casey Tibbs
- Union Pacific Railroad

== See also ==
- Cheyenne Frontier Days
- Wyoming Transportation Museum
