= Mabel Strickland Woodward =

American rodeo performer (1897–1976)

Mabel Strickland Woodward (1897 – January 3, 1976) was a n American rodeo performer who competed in several events and who was inducted into several halls of fame.

== Early life ==
Woodward was born Mabel DeLong in 1897 near Wallula, Washington, to a shoeshop owner and his wife. Since being introduced to horses at age three by her father, she trained on them consistently thereafter. She had a natural ability with horses. A nearby trick rider named Bill Donovan trained her. In 1913, she entered the Walla Walla Stampede and won the trick riding three years in a row, from 1913 to 1915. She then joined Drumhellers Wild West Productions. When rodeo champion Hugh Strickland met her, he found her to be a petite and attractive woman. In 1918, they were married. They had one daughter.

== Career ==
Starting in 1916, Woodward competed in professional rodeo, with men, for 25 years. She competed in every event except bulldogging, or steer wrestling as it is known today. One year at Cheyenne Frontier Days in Cheyenne, Wyoming, she won the all-around title. The next year after that, she came back to Cheyenne and won every event she entered. She also performed trick riding, winning many events, and even making several appearances at Madison Square Garden.

== Honors ==
- 1971 Pendleton Round-Up and Happy Canyon Hall of Fame
- 1981 Rodeo Hall of Fame of the National Cowboy & Western Heritage Museum
- 1992 National Cowgirl Museum and Hall of Fame
- 2002 Cheyenne Frontier Days Hall of Fame
- 2020 Ellensburg Rodeo Hall of Fame

== Death and legacy ==
Woodward died in Phoenix, Arizona, near her home of Buckeye, Arizona, where she had lived for the last 27 years. She died on Saturday, January 3, 1976. She had moved there with her second husband, Samuel Woodward. At the time of her death, she was the director of the Appaloosa Horse Club.
