= Western Heritage Museum & Lea County Cowboy Hall of Fame =

Hall of Fame for Cowboys

Western Heritage Museum and Lea County Cowboy Hall of Fame
- Established: 2006
- Location: Hobbs
- Coordinates: 32.757929°N 103.184227°W
- Type: Hall of fame
- Website: WHM&Lea

The Western Heritage Museum & Lea County Cowboy Hall of Fame is a museum near Hobbs, New Mexico. It features exhibits depicting the history of the Llano Estacado region of eastern New Mexico and northwestern Texas. Opened in January 2006, the museum is housed in a 26,000-square-foot (2,400 m^{2}) building on the campus of New Mexico Junior College.

== Lea County Cowboy Hall of Fame ==
The Cowboy Hall of Fame is presented annually to up to four individuals. Up to three individuals can be selected by the following criteria:

- They have roots in Lea County
- They were exceptional in their rodeo career
- They made significant contributions to Lea County in ranching

A fourth inductee can be selected by the Board of Directors using their own criteria.

== Hall of Fame Inductees ==
1978

- Clyde Browning
- John Easley
- Pello Etcheverry
- Jake McClure
- Henry Record
- George Weir
- Dow Wood

1979

- Tom Bingham
- Troy Fort
- Mary S. Hooper
- Earl Kornegay
- Dessie Sawyer
- Andrew Coke Taylor

1980

- Daniel C. Berry
- George Causey
- Robert Florence Love
- Warren Snyder
- Will Terry

1981

- Samantha Anderson
- Marrion Ruben Bess
- John Davidson Graham
- Richard David Lee

1982

- Jimmie Baum Cooper
- Alfred Green Rushing
- Adam Zimmerman

1983

- Roy Dale Cooper
- John Simeon Eaves
- Claudie A. Fort

1984

- Allen Clinton Heard
- Amos Dee Jones
- James Lewis Reed

1985

- Bob Beverly
- John Merchant
- Bill Zimmerman

1986

- W.A. Anderson
- Daisy Clayton
- Nellie Taylor

1987

- Millard Eidson
- Rubert Madera

1988

- Gene Price
- Olin Young

1989

- Clay McGonagill
- Bert Weir

1991

- Edith Davis Fanning
- Buddy Melton Medlin

1992

- Dale "Tuffy" Cooper
- Willim S. "Colonel" Williams

1993

- M.R. "Russ" Anderson
- J.W. "Uncle Jim" Owens

1994

- Charles Walter Fairweather
- Matthew Hawkins Medlin

1995

- Fern Sawyer
- William Robert Bilbrey

1996

- W.D. "Jiggs" Dinwiddle
- Tom Pearson

1997

- John Lusk
- U.D. "Ulysses" Sawyer

1998

- Betty Gayle Cooper Ratliff
- Tom Linebery

1999

- Ella Belle Holeman
- John Pearson

2000

- Herchel R. "Gravy" Field
- John Byron Fort

2001

- Homer Ingle

2002

- Bill Lee
- Virgil Linam
- Giles Lee

2003

- Tom Bess
- Suzanne Jones

2004

- Punch Jones
- Marvin Powell

2005

- Sanford Bilberry
- R.D. Sims

2006

- Bob Eidson

2007

- Becky Jo Doom
- Richard D. Lee
- Larry F. Wooten
- Kenny Smith

2008

- Bill Brininstool
- Roy "Buddy" Fort

2009

- Sam Bruton
- Faye Linam

2010

- Scharbauer Eidson
- Bill Smith

2011

- Kress Jones
- Charlie Daymon Hardin

2012

- Gene Cessnun
- Walter "Lee" Greebon
- William Daniel "Dub" McWhorter

2013

- Charles William "C.W." Kinsolving
- Evelyn Muriel Terry McNeill
- Hugh "Rack" Ward

2015

- Guy Allen
- Dorthy Bess
- Jimmie Torn Cooper
- Carl E. Sams

2016

- Bert Madera
- Phil Smith Sr.
- Charlcia Taylor

2017

- Bennet Jackson Caudill
- Jerry B. Clayton
- Mathias Willhoit

2018

- Charlie Butler "C.B." Cochran
- Herbert Neil Love

2019

- Albert "Suckerod" Ozborn
- J.E. Teague

2020

- V.M. Chambers
- Clara E. (Bradley) Fowler

2021

- Daniel C. Berry III
- Tommy Charles Price
