= Ellensburg Rodeo =

Annual rodeo

Coordinates: 46°59′55.4″N 120°31′57.7″W

- Genre: Rodeo
- Frequency: annually
- Location: Ellensburg, Washington
- Website: Official Website

The Ellensburg Rodeo opens every Labor Day weekend along with the Kittitas County Fair in Ellensburg, Washington. Started in 1923, the Ellensburg Rodeo has grown from a local competition among ranch hands to the Professional event of today with over 600 contestants and prize money in excess of $700,000. Located within the Pacific Northwest, the Ellensburg Rodeo is considered to be one of America's top 25 rodeos. The Ellensburg Rodeo was inducted to the ProRodeo Hall of Fame in 2020.

The rodeo went on hiatus from 1942 to 1944 because of World War II, and in 2020 because of the COVID-19 pandemic.

== See also ==
- Rodeo
- List of Rodeos
- Professional Rodeo Cowboys Association
- ProRodeo Hall of Fame
- Dan Collins Taylor
