= All-Around =

Rodeo award

The All-Around is an award given to a rodeo competitor who is most successful in two or more events. Most individual rodeos and championships determine the winner of this award at the conclusion of the other events or championships.

== Championships ==
The Professional Rodeo Cowboys Association (PRCA) All-Around World Championship is awarded at the Thomas & Mack Center at the National Finals Rodeo (NFR) in Las Vegas, Nevada, held every December. The PRCA competitor who wins the most prize money in a year while competing in at least two events, earning a minimum of $3,000 in each event, wins the all-around world championship. All of the events for the NFR are held at the Thomas & Mack Center, except the steer roping, which is called the National Finals Steer Roping (NFSR) and is held at the Kansas Star Arena in Mulvane, Kansas.

Trevor Brazile of Decatur, Texas, currently holds the single season record for the most money won in a season at $507,921 during the 2010 campaign. He also holds the record for most all-around titles with 14 from competing in the timed-events of tie-down roping, steer roping, and team-roping. Brazile holds a total of 26 titles altogether in roping events, another record. Ty Murray, who is known as the modern day "King of the Cowboys" of Stephenville, Texas, previously held the record with seven titles, from competing in the rough-stock events, such as saddle bronc riding, bareback bronc riding, and bull riding. He also holds two titles in bull riding.

The International Professional Rodeo Association (IPRA) All-Around World Championship is awarded at the International Finals Rodeo (IFR) at the Lazy E Arena in Guthrie, Oklahoma, every January, along with the other world championships for the IPRA.

In Canada, under the rules set forth by the Canadian Professional Rodeo Association (CPRA), in order for a competitor to win the all-around crown, that contestant must win the most money and compete two or more of saddle bronc riding, bareback riding, bull riding, tie-down roping, steer wrestling or team roping. One of the two events must be a rough-stock event and one must be a timed event. The CPRA All-Around Championship is awarded, along with the other CPRA year-end rodeo championship titles at the Canadian Finals Rodeo (CFR), held every autumn.

== See also ==
- PRCA All-Around Champion
