= National Breakaway Finals =

The National Breakaway Finals (NBF), organized by the Women's Professional Rodeo Association (WPRA), is the premier championship breakaway roping event in the United States. It showcases the talents of the WPRA's top 15 money winners in the breakaway roping world standings at the end of the regular season as they compete for the world championship.

== About ==
Breakaway roping started becoming a regular event at some PRCA-sanctioned rodeos in 2019, making it along with barrel racing the two female events sanctioned by the WPRA in PRCA rodeos. By 2024, breakaway roping was held in approximately 500 PRCA rodeos.

For many years, the WPRA world champion breakaway roper was determined at the WPRA World Finals in Texas. However, beginning in 2020, the title was determined at the National Finals Breakaway Roping (NFBR). It was held every December in conjunction with the National Finals Rodeo (NFR) sanctioned by the Professional Rodeo Cowboys Association (PRCA), which determines the world championships for the PRCA's rodeo events for male contestants, as well as the WPRA's world champion barrel racer. Like the NFR, the Wrangler jeans company became the NFBR's title sponsor.

The NFR has been held at the Thomas & Mack Center in Las Vegas, Nevada, since 1985. However, as a result of the COVID-19 pandemic and Nevada state restriction on large events, the 2020 NFR was held at Globe Life Field in Arlington, Texas, where the state's health restrictions were less onerous. The inaugural NFBR was also held that year at the same venue.

In 2021, the NFR returned to the Thomas & Mack Center in Las Vegas, and the NFBR was also held in said city, only it took place at the Orleans Arena. Since 2022, the NFBR has been held in Las Vegas' South Point Arena. Unlike the first two NFBRs, which took place on same days as the NFR, since 2022, the NFBR takes place two days before the start of the NFR.

The 2025 NFBR was originally scheduled to take place on December 2-3 at the South Point Arena. However, as a result of the November EHV-1/EHM outbreak, the event was postponed. It was ultimately held on December 22-23 at Cowtown Coliseum in Fort Worth, Texas, after the completion of the NFR in Las Vegas.

In 2026, the National Finals Breakaway Roping (NFBR) was renamed the National Breakaway Finals (NBF) and found a new home at the Will Rogers Memorial Coliseum in Fort Worth, and will continue taking place after the completion of the NFR. Wrangler continues to be its title sponsor.

== Breakaway roping ==
Breakaway roping is a variation of calf roping where a calf is roped, but not thrown and tied. It is a rodeo event that features a calf and one mounted rider. The calves are moved one at a time through narrow runs leading to a chute with spring-loaded doors. The horse and rider wait in a box next to the chute that has a spring-loaded rope, known as the barrier, stretched in front. A light rope is fastened from the chute to the calf's neck, releasing once the calf is well away from the chute and releasing the barrier, which is used to ensure that the calf gets a head start. Once the barrier has released, the horse runs out of the box while the roper attempts to throw a lasso around the neck of the calf.

Once the rope is around the calf's neck, the roper signals the horse to stop suddenly. The rope is tied to the saddle horn with a string. When the calf hits the end of the rope, the rope is pulled tight and the string breaks. The breaking of the string marks the end of the run. The rope usually has a small white flag at the end that makes the moment the rope breaks more easily seen by the timer. The fastest run wins.

The most common penalty in breakaway roping is the 10 seconds added when a roper breaks the barrier, failing to give the calf the appropriate head start. Breakaway ropes may also be flagged out (disqualified) for any catch other than a bell-collar catch—that is, a clean catch around the calf's neck.
