= Mulvane, West Virginia =

- Unincorporated community
- Location within West Virginia Location within the United States
- Coordinates: 38°9′39″N 81°2′56″W
- Country: United States
- State: West Virginia
- County: Fayette
- Elevation: 1,427 ft (435 m)
- Time zone: UTC-5 (Eastern (EST))
  - Summer (DST): UTC-4 (EDT)
- GNIS ID: 1556156

Mulvane was an unincorporated community in Fayette County, West Virginia, United States.

The community most likely was named after the local Mulvane (or O'Mulvanny) family.
