= South Dakota Sports Hall of Fame =

Sporting Hall of Fame in South Dakota, USA

The South Dakota Sports Hall of Fame is a sports hall of fame honoring individuals associated with the U.S. state of South Dakota. It is "dedicated to the preservation, documentation and display of South Dakota's sports history." As of 2017, the hall contains 288 members. The 2017 class of inductees comprised Marvin Garrett, Burnell Glanzer, Harvey Naasz, Forry Flaagan, Dana Nielsen Honner, Amy Burnett, Duane Rykhus, Jerry James, Mel Antonen, and Jim E. Ricketts. Inducted in the class of 2016 were Ben Leber, Steve Heidenreich, Greg Hansen, Rich Hanson, Joe Trudeau, Jim Mitchell, Tom Long, Patricia Reisdorfer, Doug Schlepp, and Bob Olson.
