= Wilbur Plaugher =

American cowboy, rodeo clown and dog trainer

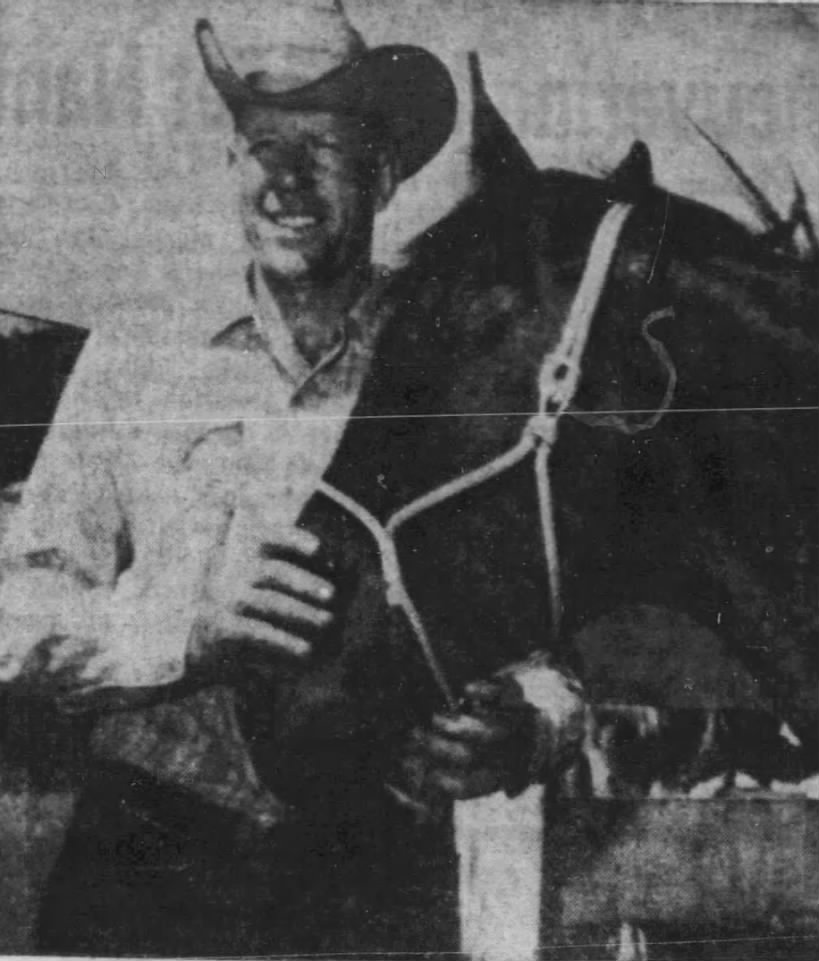
- Plaugher in 1963
- Born: March 13, 1922; Ohio, U.S.
- Died: January 2, 2018 (aged 95); Sanger, California, U.S.
- Occupations: Cowboy, rodeo clown, dog trainer
- Children: 4 (Note: Plaugher was the father of two sons and two daughters)

Wilbur Plaugher (March 13, 1922 – January 2, 2018) was an American cowboy, rodeo clown and dog trainer.

== Life and career ==
Plaugher was born in Ohio. At the age of four, he and his family moved to California.

In 1974, Plaugher and steer-wrestling, calf-roping champion Mark Schricker formed the Fellowship of Christian Cowboys as a chapter of the pre-existing Fellowship of Christian Athletes.

In 1982, Plaugher was named as ProRodeo Clown of the Year.

In 1990, Plaugher was inducted into the ProRodeo Hall of Fame.

Plaugher died on January 2, 2018, in Sanger, California, at the age of 95.
