= Snake River Stampede =

Coordinates: 43°36′29″N 116°30′29″W

The Snake River Stampede is a rodeo held in Nampa, Idaho. It is one of the top twelve professional rodeos recognized by the Professional Rodeo Cowboys Association (PRCA) and is held for five days every year, previously held during the third week of July, but changed to the third week of June in 2025. There are many community events which help kick off the rodeo week. The rodeo was inducted by the ProRodeo Hall of Fame in 2014.

== History ==
The Snake River Stampede had its humble beginnings as a bucking contest in conjunction with Nampa's harvest festival. The bucking contest was added to the harvest festival in 1913 and it became the "Rodeo and Buck Show." An area was roped off for the contest on the present site of the Nampa Post Office. Spectators watched from behind the ropes, as there were no bleachers. The bucking contest gained in popularity, and other events were added to the show.

By 1937, the rodeo broke away from the autumn harvest festival, and the show moved to summer in July. At this time, the rodeo joined the Cowboys' Turtle Association (later known as Rodeo Cowboys Association and eventually Professional Rodeo Cowboys Association) and a new name was chosen. After considering such names as Ski-Hi Rodeo and Thunder Mountain Round Up, rodeo director Ike Corlett chose "Snake River Stampede."

In 1950, a new stadium was built on Garrity Boulevard, directly west of the American Legion baseball stadium (Bill Lofholm Field at Rodeo Park) and north of Lakeview Park. The horseshoe-shaped outdoor stadium opened to the east and seated 10,000. Cowboy singers were brought in to sing at half-time, during the rodeo. Gene Autry was the first of such singers, followed by others, such as Roy Rogers & Dale Evans, Rex Allen, and the Sons of the Pioneers.

The era of Cowboy stars died out and country singers were added to the lineup. Performers included Reba McEntire, Glen Campbell, and Barbara Mandrell.

During the 1980s, singers were replaced by more rodeo events, such as team roping, ladies' barrel racing, and bullfighting. Kids' mutton busting was added in the 1990s.

In 1997, a brand new indoor stadium was built in conjunction with the Ford Idaho Center, located just northeast of exit 38 on Interstate 84. The 1950 stadium at the "Stampede Grounds" was demolished and the site is now occupied by The Hispanic Cultural Center of Idaho. It is separated from the baseball field by a new street, Stampede Drive, which passes through the area that held the east ends of the north and south grandstands. The open area to the northeast was used for parking and is now Snake River Elementary School.

The stampede went on hiatus in 1917–18, 1942–45 & 2020.

== Community festival ==
There are many popular events to kick off the week of the Snake River Stampede during Snake River Days. These events are designed to create enthusiasm among residents to see the rodeo. They also create a sense of community in the city.

- Buckaroo Breakfast
- Rodeo Parade
- Equestrian Drill Team Competition

== Pre-rodeo events ==
- Rope & Run
- Slack Competition
- Mutton busting
- Miss Rodeo Idaho Competition
- Calf Scramble Scholarship Endowment
- Equestrian Drill Teams
- Snake River Stampeders - Night Light Equestrian Drill Team

== Rodeo events ==
- Bareback bronc riding
- Steer wrestling
- Team roping
- Saddle bronc riding
- Tie-down roping
- Barrel racing
- Bull riding
