= Steer roping =

Rodeo event

Steer roping, also known as steer tripping or steer jerking, is a rodeo event that features a steer and one mounted cowboy.

== Technique ==
The steer roper starts behind a "barrier" - a taut rope fastened with an easily broken string which is fastened lightly to the steer. When the roper calls for the steer, the chute man trips a lever, opening the doors. The steer breaks out running. When the steer reaches the end of the tether, the string breaks, releasing the barrier for the horse and roper. Should the roper break the barrier, a 10-second penalty is added to his time. The roper must throw his rope in a loop around the steer's horns.

Once the rope is around the steer's horns, a right-handed roper throws the slack of the rope over the steer's right hip and then turns his horse to the left; when the rope comes tight, it pulls on the steer's hip up and turns the steer's head around, tripping or unbalancing the steer so that it falls. The roper dismounts while his horse continues to gallop, pulling the steer along the ground, which prevents the animal from getting back to its feet. The horse is trained to slow once the rider is completely off the horse and has reached the steer, but to keep the rope taunt while the contestant ties three of the steer's legs together with a piggin string using a half hitch knot colloquially called a hooey.

The roper returns to his horse, mounts, and moves the horse forward, releasing the tension on the rope. An official will then time six seconds. If the steer is still tied at the end of the six seconds, an official time for the event is awarded.

Team roping is an unrelated event using two riders to rope a steer, one which ropes the head, the other the heels, immobilizing the animal between them. Calf roping or tie-down roping is an event, using a weanling calf that the roper manually throws to the ground after roping and then ties. A related event using calves is breakaway roping, where the calf is roped but not tied.

== Professional steer roping ==
Professional steer roping occurs at the highest level in the Professional Rodeo Cowboys Association (PRCA). At the end of each season, there is a finals event called the National Finals Steer Roping (NFSR) which takes place in early November at the Kansas Star Arena in Mulvane, Kansas. Other PRCA events take place in early December at the National Finals Rodeo (NFR) at the Thomas & Mack Center in Las Vegas, Nevada.

== Animal welfare ==
Steer roping is considered controversial due to concerns about animal welfare. Within the United States it has been illegal in Rhode Island since 2001.

Steer roping is recognized by the Professional Rodeo Cowboys Association (PRCA), but downplayed, mentioned only in passing at the official PRCA website. It is only held at some rodeos, currently about 60 per year, the annual championship competition is held separately from other championship events, and steer roping is not included as part of the widely televised National Finals Rodeo.
