= Kansas Star Casino =

Casino and hotel in Mulvane, Kansas

Coordinates: 37.46910°N 97.32878°W

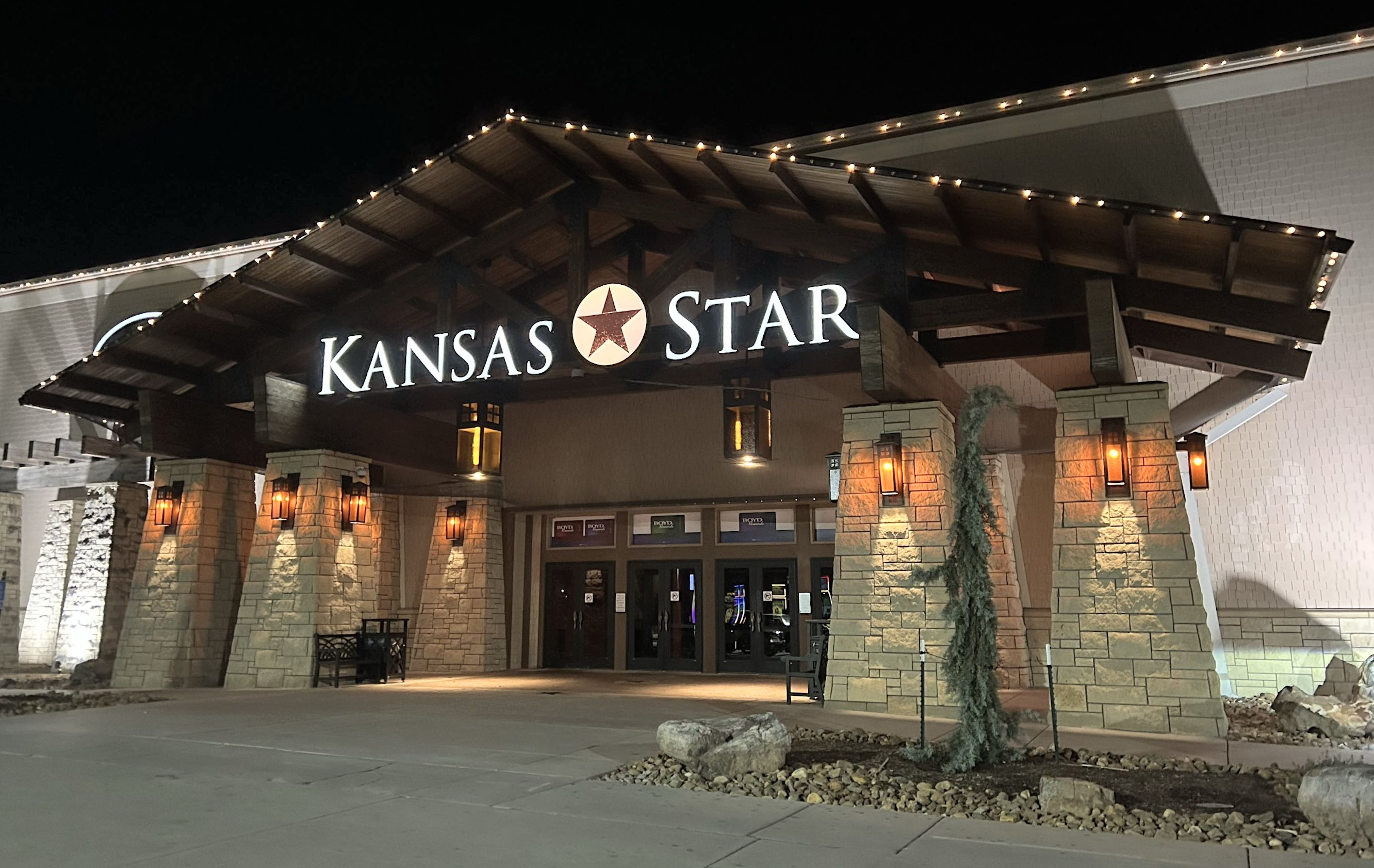
- Entrance to Kansas Star Casino in 2026
- Interactive map of Kansas Star Casino
- Location: Mulvane, Kansas; 777 Kansas Star Drive
- Opened: December 26, 2011
- No. of rooms: 300
- Casino type: Land-based
- Owner: Boyd Gaming
- Website: kansasstarcasino.com

The Kansas Star Casino is a casino and hotel in western Mulvane, Kansas, United States, owned and managed by Boyd Gaming. It is located on the west side of the I-35 (Kansas Turnpike).

The resort includes the Kansas Star Arena, a multipurpose entertainment venue that hosts concerts, pageants, and various athletic and equestrian events.

== History ==
=== Proposals and development ===
In 2007, the state enacted the Kansas Expanded Lottery Act, which included authorization for four casinos to be built and managed by private developers, under contract with the Kansas Lottery. One of the casinos was allocated to the Wichita area (Sedgwick and Sumner Counties). The law required a local referendum in each county before a casino could be approved. This requirement was waived for Sumner County because it had passed an advisory measure in favor of casino gaming in 2005. The referendum failed in Sedgwick County, leaving Sumner County as the area's only possible casino site. Casino proposals in Sumner County were divided between Wellington, the largest town in the county, and Mulvane, which was 14 miles closer to the area's main population center, Wichita. The first round of proposals in 2008 resulted in the selection of Harrah's Entertainment over two other bidders, but Harrah's then withdrew due to the 2008 financial crisis. A new selection process opened in 2009 and drew three applicants, but all eventually withdrew their proposals.

A third bidding process opened in April 2010, again drawing three bidders. Harrah's and Peninsula Gaming each proposed a casino to be built in Mulvane, and Global Gaming proposed a casino in Wellington. Harrah's again withdrew its application, and Peninsula Gaming was then selected as the winner over Global Gaming in December 2010.

=== Opening to present ===
The casino opened in a temporary facility on December 26, 2011. The permanent casino facility opened in December 2012. The property's hotel, a Hampton Inn, opened with 150 rooms in October 2012, and expanded to 300 rooms in August 2014. The temporary casino building was converted to its permanent use as a 3,400-seat arena, with an inaugural concert by Daughtry in June 2013.

In 2017, Kansas Attorney General Derek Schmidt "issued an opinion saying that allowing a revote on Wichita’s Greyhound Park may breach the state’s contract with the Kansas Star casino in Mulvane," potentially resulting in the casino needing to be repaid by the state for privilege fee or other damages.

It was one of four state-owned casinos to be mandated to close on March 17, 2020 by the Kansas Lottery, in response to the COVID-19 pandemic. It re-opened May 22, 2020 after orders from Kansas Governor Laura Kelly, at reduced capacity to allow for social distancing to comply with health orders, and with a limit to only slot machines, as well as employees undergoing temperature checks and wearing face coverings. Visitors had social distancing enforced and had their temperatures checked. On Jan 26, 2021, the casino held a vaccine event offering Pfizer and Moderna.

In early 2021 because of COVID-19, revenue was down 24 percent. Overall, revenue declined by around $45 million by February 14, 2021, to $141.4 million in 2020, down from $186.4 million in 2019. In 2021, it was reported by the City of Mulvane that the casino since its 2012 opening had "challenged its valuation every year" for tax assessments. Rulings were only passed down in 2012, 2013 and 2015 in those years, with the casino occasionally refunded overpaid taxes. In 2021, when the city received less in taxes from the casino and had to return around $1 million in back property taxes to the casino, it was reported that the city's budget had to be re-organized for 2022. Other taxing entities for the casino, including Sumner County, were affected as well.

For 2021, the Wichita Force indoor football team officially relocated to the Kansas Star Arena. In February 2021, it was reported that Kansas Star Casino had opened in Sumner County instead of Sedgwick County because of Sedgwick county's local laws against gambling. That month, a new casino opened about thirty miles from Kansas Star in Sedgwick County, despite legal battles from the city of Mulvane and Sumner County to stop it from opening. The State of Kansas also had sued the new casino, while still owning the Kansas Star Casino as competition. An appeal was filed in August 2021.

CeeLo Green performed at the Kansas Star Arena in December 2021. In January 2022 after a downward trend in 2021, the casino posted its highest gambling revenue monthly in December in over seven months. It was the highest since April 2021. In December 2021, monthly revenue had been $14.8 million, translating with a 1% monthly revenue share to about $150,000 for the city of Mulvane.

== Facilities ==
The casino has several eateries and bars, including a bar and grill (Tin Lizard), a steakhouse (Woodfire Grille), and a food court with Mexican, Asian, and Italian options.

When the casino's main building opened, it contained the Fire Club, named for "its signature fireplace" - akin to a skybox, it overlooks the arena and measures 3,200 square feet with a bar and patio. The arena opened afterwards in July 2013 with seating for up to 5,000.

The Kansas Star Arena is a multipurpose entertainment venue that has hosted concerts by notable performing artists, as well as the Miss Kansas USA pageant, mixed martial arts events by Bellator MMA, and equestrian events such as the Professional Rodeo Cowboys Association’s National Finals Steer Roping. In 2021, the Wichita Force professional indoor football team played home games in the arena. The Event Center Ballroom is a smaller theater that presents more intimate shows.

On September 4, 2021, the venue hosted a "Rock of the 70s" show with a lineup including Foghat. In September 2021, it was announced Boyz II Men would be performing next spring.

== See also ==
- Kansas Stars
- List of casinos in Kansas
