= Texas Rodeo Hall of Fame =

Hall of Fame for Cowboys

Coordinates: 31.427916°N 103.496174°W

- Preserving West of the Pecos Rodeo History by Honoring Those Who Have Made It.

- Location within Texas
- Established: December 21, 1999
- Location: 100 E Dot Stafford Street, Pecos, TX 79772
- Type: Hall of Fame
- Website: https://texasrodeohalloffame.squarespace.com/

The Texas Rodeo Hall of Fame is a hall of fame in Pecos, Texas, dedicated to the sport of rodeo.

== History ==
The Texas Rodeo Hall of Fame was incorporated on December 21, 1999. The founder, John T. Rediger, was the TRHoF's first president. In 2004, the Texas Rodeo Hall of Fame held its first induction in a back room of the West of the Pecos Museum. The Hall of Fame has inducted individuals from all of the rodeo events and from the categories used in the ProRodeo Hall of Fame, and others. In 2019, located in the Baggage Area of the Old T&P Depot, the Texas Rodeo Hall of Fame was opened to the public.

== Present day ==
The Texas Rodeo Hall of Fame inducts individuals that have competed in the West of the Pecos rodeo and gone on to make a name for themselves in the rodeo world. The TRHoF is located in the Old T&P Train Depot at 100 East Dot Stafford Street. Located in the same building as the Pecos Chamber of Commerce, the Hall of Fame's hours are Tuesday-Saturday from 10am-4pm. The Texas Rodeo Hall of Fame is a 501(c)3 entity.

== Inductees ==
- Jim Bob Altizer (2004)
- Quail Dobbs (2004)
- Jewel Duncan (2004)
- Buck Jackson (2004)
- Phil Lyne (2004)
- Jim Sharp (2004)
- Henry Slack (2004)
- Isora DeRacy Young (2004)
- Dale "Tuffy" Cooper (2005)
- Jim Davis (2005)
- C.F. "Sonny" Davis (2005)
- Arnold Felts (2005)
- Shawn McMullan (2005)
- Louis Powers (2005)
- Guy Allen (2006)
- James Pruett Espy, Sr. (2006)
- Troy Fort (2006)
- Snooky Griffith (2006)
- Toots Mansfield (2006)
- Tommy Steiner (2006)
- Jiggs Barfield (2008)
- Wanda Harper Bush (2008)
- Roy Cooper (2008)
- Charles Good (2008)
- Walton Poage (2008)
- Billie Ann Evans (2009)
- J.W. "Bub" Evans (2009)
- Dan Fisher (2009)
- John D. Holleyman (2009)
- Curtis McElroy (2009)
- Dorothy Hyatt Roberson (2009)
- James Allen (2010)
- Sherry Johnson (2010)
- Peppy McKinney (2010)
- Buddy Neal (2010)
- Jack Riggs (2010)
- Eva Mae Wilken Holleyman (2014)
- Margaret Owens (2014)
- Blanche Altizer Smith (2014)
- Bill Teague (2014)
- Travis "Shot" Branham (2015)
- Jackie Bob Cox (2015)
- Clark McEntire (2015)
- John Rae Powell (2015)
- Earl William Acton (2016)
- Skipper & Wanda Driver (2016)
- David Lynn Hess (2016)
- Mary Dale "Sis" Miller (2016)
- Walt Arnold (2017)
- Wacey Cathey (2017)
- Pam Perner Goodwin (2017)
- Tyler Magnus (2018)
- Ronnye L. Sewalt (2018)
- Vernon “Dude” Smith Jr. (2019)
- Kay Blandford (2019)
- Adam Carrillo (2019)
- Gilbert Carrillo (2019)
- Teesquantee “Tee” Woolman (2019)
- Martha Josey (2021)
- Bobby Mote (2021)
- Rich Skelton (2021)
- Marvin Cantrell (2022)
- Angela Ganter (2022)
- Jack Ward (2022)
- Mack Altizer (2023)
- Doug Miller (2023)
- Taos Muncy (2023)

== See also ==
- List of museums in West Texas
