= National Finals Steer Roping =

The National Finals Steer Roping (NFSR), organized by the Professional Rodeo Cowboys Association (PRCA), is the premier championship steer roping event in the United States. It showcases the talents of the PRCA's top 15 money winners in the steer roping world standings at the end of the regular season as they compete for the world championship.

== About ==
The National Finals Steer Roping (NFSR) event takes place annually every November. It has been held in several locations throughout its history. In 1959 and 1960, it took place in Clayton, New Mexico; in 1961 in Laramie, Wyoming; in 1962 in Douglas, Wyoming; in 1963 and 1964 in Pawhuska, Oklahoma; in 1965 and 1966 in Vinita, Oklahoma; in 1967 and 1968 in McAlester, Oklahoma; in 1969 and 1970 in Pecos, Texas; in 1971 and 1972 again in Pawhuska, Oklahoma; from 1973 through 1983 again in Laramie, Wyoming; from 1984 through 2000 in Guthrie, Oklahoma; from 2001 through 2005 in Amarillo, Texas; from 2006 through 2008 in Hobbs, New Mexico; from 2009 through 2013 again in Guthrie, Oklahoma; and since 2014, it has been held at the Kansas Star Arena in Mulvane, Kansas.

Throughout its history, the NFSR has also had a different number of rounds. From 1959 through 1969, it had six rounds; in 1970, there were five rounds; in 1971 and 1972, the event reverted to six rounds; from 1973 through 1975, there were eight rounds; and since 1976, the NFSR has had ten rounds.

The NFSR is a separate event from the National Finals Rodeo (NFR), which holds the finals for all of the other PRCA rodeo events in December at the Thomas & Mack Center in Las Vegas, Nevada. Since 2019, the Legacy Steer Roping tour, a series of events exclusively for steer ropers aged 50 and up has held its finals in conjunction with the NFSR.

== Steer roping ==
In the steer roping rodeo event, a cowboy and horse pursue a Corriente steer whose horns have been reinforced for protection. The cowboy must lasso the steer's horns and then ties the rope to his saddle. He must stop his horse promptly so that it throws the steer to the ground. The cowboy then quickly dismounts in order to tie three of the steer's legs together. He raises both hands to indicate completion. Just like tie-down roping, the tie must hold for six seconds. Steer roping is a timed event such that the competitor with the fastest time wins.

== Records ==
In 2016, Cody Lee set a record for most money won at $69,651. The fastest time recorded is 8.3 seconds and it is shared by three cowboys: Cash Myers (2006), Jess Tierney (2015), and Guy Allen (2016). In 2015, Trevor Brazile set the record for the fastest time on 10 head at 111.3 seconds. In 2012, Cody Scheck set the fastest roping time at 7.7 seconds for a PRCA event, in Fort Smith, Arkansas. From 1977 through 2008, Guy Allen has the most finals qualifications at 32 counting all PRCA events. From 1991 through 2001, Allen won the most consecutive world titles with 11 in a row. Across all events, Allen holds the most qualifications with 33 as of 2016. Allen has the most NFSR Average wins with five (1989, 1991, 1997, 2000, and 2004). Allen has won the most go-rounds overall with 48. In 1993, Arnold Felt won the most go-rounds in a single year with six total. Guy Allen has won the most world titles with 18 total.
