= National Finals Rodeo =

Premier rodeo event

- Association: PRCA
- Sport: Bull riding
- Founded: 1959; 67 years ago
- Competitors: Top 15 contestants in each event
- Country: United States
- Venues: Thomas & Mack Center; Las Vegas, Nevada, U.S.
- Broadcaster: The Cowboy Channel
- Streaming partner: Cowboy+
- Sponsor: Wrangler

The National Finals Rodeo (NFR) is the premier championship rodeo of the Professional Rodeo Cowboys Association (PRCA). It showcases the talents of the PRCA's top 15 money winners in the season for each event.

The NFR is held each year in the first full week of December, at the Thomas & Mack Center on the campus of the University of Nevada, Las Vegas (UNLV) in Paradise, Nevada, United States. It is televised live on The Cowboy Channel and streamed live on the Cowboy+ app. Cowboy Christmas, a cowboy gift show, is held concurrent with the rodeo at the Las Vegas Convention Center.

Since the rodeo uses 'special dirt', the dirt is stored on the UNLV campus for use in the next NFR.

== History ==
The National Finals Rodeo (NFR), known popularly as the "Super Bowl of rodeo," is a championship event held annually by the Professional Rodeo Cowboys Association (PRCA). Said organization, founded in 1936 as the Cowboys' Turtle Association, then renamed the Rodeo Cowboys Association in 1945, and known as the Professional Rodeo Cowboys Association since 1975, established the NFR in order to determine the world champion in each of rodeo's seven main events.

Bareback riding, steer wrestling, saddle bronc riding, tie-down roping, and bull riding have all been a part of the NFR since the first one in 1959. Team roping was added in 1962 and barrel racing was added in 1967. The NFR showcases the talents of the PRCA's top fifteen money winners in each event as they compete for the world title. From 1981 through 2000, the NFR also had American freestyle bullfighting, where the top six bullfighters from the Wrangler Bullfighting Tour, which had the Wrangler jeans company as the title sponsor, competed at the event after a year of competing at numerous regular-season events for the chance to qualify for the NFR and try to win the bullfighting world championship. The Wrangler Bullfighting Tour was discontinued after 2000, and freestyle bullfighting became largely obscured for several years, until being heavily revived in the 2010s. Today, freestyle bullfighting has its own organizations that specialize in the event and world championships are determined there. The world championship steer roping competition, the National Finals Steer Roping (NFSR), also held since 1959, has always been held separately from the regular NFR. The NFSR has been held at the Kansas Star Arena in Mulvane, Kansas, since 2014. Beginning in 2020, the National Finals Breakaway Roping (NFBR) was held to determine the Women's Professional Rodeo Association's world champion breakaway roper. The event was held in conjunction with the NFR.

The inaugural NFR was held in 1959 in Dallas, Texas, at the Texas State Fair Coliseum and continued at that venue through 1961. From 1962 to 1964, Los Angeles, California's Los Angeles Sports Arena hosted the competition. Oklahoma City, Oklahoma, successfully bid in 1964 to be the host city. In 1965, the first NFR at the State Fair Arena drew 47,027 fans. The NFR remained there through 1978. From 1979 to 1984, the NFR took place at Oklahoma City's Myriad Convention Center, bringing state merchants an estimated annual revenue of $8 million. In 1984, Las Vegas bid for the event. Although the Oklahoma City Council considered building a new $30 million arena at the State Fairgrounds, the Las Vegas bid won. Since 1985, the NFR has been held at the Thomas & Mack Center in Las Vegas, Nevada. The NFR has become Thomas & Mack Center arena's biggest client, bringing in more than 170,000 fans during the 10-day event.

The NFR has had a different number of rounds throughout its history. In 1959 and 1960, there were ten rounds; from 1961 to 1966, there were eight rounds; from 1967 to 1969, there were nine rounds; from 1970 to 1977, the event went back to ten rounds; in 1978, there were eleven rounds; and in 1979, the NFR reverted back to having ten rounds, which has been consistent since then.

In 2001, a landmark sponsorship agreement was achieved and Wrangler became the first title sponsor of the National Finals Rodeo. The agreement, part of the Professional Rodeo Cowboys Association's continuing effort to elevate professional rodeo to a new level, was made by PRCA commissioner Steven J. Hatchell.

Oklahoma has bid to return the NFR to Oklahoma City, but is always outbid by the deep pockets of Las Vegas. Starting in 2011, Oklahoma City hosted the National Circuit Finals Rodeo (NCFR), which is the Finals for the PRCA's semi-pro series. This was seen as a step towards proving the crowds exist to bring the NFR back to Oklahoma City when Las Vegas' contract was scheduled to end in 2014. Following the completion of the 2013 rodeo, Dallas, Texas, and Kissimmee, Florida, made bids to become the host city starting in 2015. On January 24, 2014, the PRCA signed a contract extension through 2024 with the Las Vegas Convention and Visitors Authority. Because the Dallas area hosted in 2020 as a result of Nevada state restrictions, the contract extension was moved to 2025. However, just a few days before the start of the 2023 NFR, it was announced that the Las Vegas Events Board of Trustees and the PRCA Board of Directors had reached an agreement to keep the NFR in Las Vegas through 2035.

Due to the COVID-19 pandemic and Nevada's state mandated health restrictions, the 2020 National Finals Rodeo returned to the Dallas-Fort Worth Metroplex for the first time since 1961 at Globe Life Field in Arlington, Texas, where the state's health restrictions were less onerous. The inaugural National Finals Breakaway Roping (NFBR) was also held at Globe Life Field.

The NFR returned to the Thomas & Mack Center in Las Vegas in 2021, while the NFBR moved to the Orleans Arena, also in Las Vegas, that same year.

In 2022, the NFBR moved to Las Vegas' South Point Arena. Unlike the first two NFBRs, which took place on same days as the NFR, beginning in 2022, the NFBR took place two days before the start of the NFR.

The 2023 NFR was scheduled to take place from Thursday, December 7 through Saturday, December 16. However, as a result of the UNLV shooting on Wednesday, December 6, which occurred at the Lee Business School, only a mile away from the Thomas & Mack Center, the first round of the NFR was postponed out of respect for the victims. Instead, the first day of competition was held on Friday, December 8. To ensure that there would be ten rounds, on Wednesday, December 13, there were two rounds; one in the afternoon behind closed doors (meaning those with Night One tickets were not given a makeup) and the next one that night with standard Wednesday tickets.

In May 2024, it was reported that the NFR could move to the New Las Vegas Stadium of the Las Vegas Athletics once the stadium opens in 2028.

In June 2024, the PRCA and Las Vegas Events announced that their contract to keep the NFR in Las Vegas through 2035 would amount to $264,324,473 in total prize money for contestants and stock contractors.

The 2025 NFBR was originally scheduled to take place on December 2 and 3 at the South Point Arena. However, as a result of the November EHV-1/EHM outbreak, the event was postponed. It was ultimately held on December 22 and 23 at Cowtown Coliseum in Fort Worth, Texas, after the completion of the NFR in Las Vegas.

In January 2026, the NFR was inducted into the Las Vegas Magazine Hall of Fame. Also that year, the National Finals Breakaway Roping (NFBR) was renamed the National Breakaway Finals (NBF) and found a new home at the Will Rogers Memorial Coliseum in Fort Worth, and will continue taking place after the completion of the NFR.

== Events ==
The NFR is the final rodeo of the PRCA season. World championship titles are awarded to the individuals who earn the most money in his or her event throughout the year.

Seven events and nine championships are sanctioned by the PRCA:

- Bareback riding - a rider has to stay on a bucking horse and is only allowed to hang on with a "rigging" attached by a cinch and latigos. The rider must stay on the horse for eight seconds to be considered a successful ride. Each successful ride is then judged for a maximum score of 100 points. The more difficult the horse is to ride and the more control the contestant has during the ride, the higher the score. After a successful ride, two pickup riders in the arena assist the contestant by helping him safely dismount the still-moving horse. The bareback rider with the highest score wins.
- Steer wrestling - also known as "bulldogging," is a rodeo event where the rider jumps off his horse onto a Corriente steer and 'wrestles' it to the ground by grabbing it by the horns. The contestant that wrestles the steer to the ground the fastest wins. This is probably the single most physically dangerous event in rodeo for the cowboy, who runs a high risk of jumping off a running horse head first and missing the steer, or of having the thrown steer land on top of him, sometimes horns first.
- Team roping - also called "heading and heeling," is the only team event in professional rodeo. Two ropers capture and restrain a Corriente steer whose horns have been reinforced for protection. One horse and rider, the "header," lassos a running steer's horns, while the other horse and rider, the "heeler," lassos the steer's two hind legs. Once the animal is captured, the riders face each other and lightly pull the steer between them, so that both ropes are taut. The team that ropes their steer the fastest wins. This technique originated from methods of capture and restraint for treatment used on a ranch.
- Saddle bronc riding - similar to bareback riding, but the rider uses a specialized western saddle without a horn (for safety) as well as a bronc rein and has to stay on the bucking horse for eight seconds. Like in bareback riding, two pickup riders attempt to help the contestant dismount the still-moving horse after a successful ride. Also like bareback riding, each successful ride is then judged for a maximum score of 100 points. The more difficult the horse is to ride and the more control the contestant has during the ride, the higher the score. The saddle bronc rider with the highest score wins.
- Tie-down roping - also called calf roping, is based on ranch work in which calves are roped for branding, medical treatment, or other purposes. It is the oldest of rodeo's timed events. The cowboy ropes a running calf around the neck with a lariat, and his horse stops and sets back on the rope while the cowboy dismounts, runs to the calf, throws it to the ground and ties three feet together. If the calf falls when roped, the roper must lose time waiting for the calf to get back to its feet so that the roper can do the work. The job of the horse is to hold the calf steady on the rope. The contestant that ropes his calf the fastest wins. A well-trained calf-roping horse will slowly back up while the cowboy ties the calf, to help keep the lariat snug.
- Barrel racing - is a timed speed and agility event. In barrel racing, horse and rider gallop around a cloverleaf pattern of barrels, making agile turns without knocking the barrels over. The contestant that successfully passes the cloverleaf pattern the fastest wins. In professional, collegiate and high school rodeo, barrel racing is an exclusively women's sport, though men and boys occasionally compete at local O-Mok-See competition. Barrel racing takes place with other PRCA sanctioned events, but it is sanctioned by the Women's Professional Rodeo Association (WPRA). Results are shown on that web site.
- Bull riding - an event where the contestant attempts to ride a full-grown bucking bull for eight seconds. Like the bucking horse events, each successful ride is then judged for a maximum score of 100 points. The more difficult the bull is to ride and the more control the contestant has during the ride, the higher the score. The rider with the highest score wins. Although skills and equipment similar to those needed for bareback bronc riding are required, the event differs considerably from horse riding competition due to the danger involved. Because bulls are unpredictable and may attack a fallen rider, rodeo clowns, now known as "bullfighters", work during bull-riding competition to distract the bulls and help prevent injury to competitors.
- All-around - the All-around cowboy is actually an award, not an event. It is awarded to the highest money winner in two or more events.

The All-around world title is awarded at the end of the NFR to the highest-earning cowboy who has regularly competed in more than one event during the year. In addition to world championships, an average winner is crowned in each event.

Note: Steer roping is publicized separately and its finals are held separately at the National Finals Steer Roping (NFSR). The National Finals Breakaway Roping (NFBR), held in conjunction with the NFR since 2020, has been held to determine the WPRA's world champion breakaway roper.

Since the NFR is extremely popular, it sells out all seats for all of the events. Many casinos carry the events live in their sportsbooks or host special parties to accommodate all of the fans in town who cannot get tickets for the events. Most of the major hotels and casinos book special entertainment into their showrooms with a country theme offering many of the regular shows an extended break.

== Competition format ==
The NFR consists of ten days, each of which has a competition, or "go-round", in each event with its own prizes. In addition, each event has a separate set of prizes for having the best combined results over the ten days, referred to as "the average."

The payouts are based on the total prize pool. For every $208,000 in the prize pool, the top six in each go-round receive $620, $490, $370, $260, $160, and $100, and the top eight in the average receive $1,590, $1,290, $1,020, $750, $540, $390, $270, and $150.

In 2012, the prize pool was $6,125,000, so each go-round paid $18,257 for first, $14,429 for second, $10,895 for third, $7,656 for fourth, $4,712 for fifth, and $2,945 for sixth, and each event's average paid $46,821 for first, $37,987 for second, $30,036 for third, $22,085 for fourth, $15,901 for fifth, $11,484 for sixth, $7,951 for seventh, and $4,417 for eighth.

Between 2015 and 2020, the NFR paid out a total of $10 million; $8.8 million in competition prize money and $1.2 million in guaranteed prize money to qualifiers. The total purse increased to $10,257,048 in 2021 and $10,900,098 in 2022. Based on the updated purse in 2023, the increase saw round winners take home $30,706 per round and average winners earn $78,747. Each go-round paid a total of $99,053, while the average total paid $297,159 per event. The stock contractor pay, which is 30% of the contestant payout, increased to $3,450,451.

== NFR average champions ==
Year	All-Around	Bareback riding	Steer wrestling	Team roping	Saddle bronc riding	Tie-down roping	Bull riding	Steer roping	Barrel racing
1959	Jim Shoulders	Jack Buschbom					Jim Shoulders		
1960	Don McLaughlin	Benny Reynolds					Duane Howard		
1961	Benny Reynolds	Jack Buschbom (2)					Bernis Johnson		
1962	Harley May	John Hawkins					Bob Robinson		
1963	Sonny Worrell	John Hawkins (2)					Leo Brow		
1963	Jim Bob Altizer	Jack Buschbom (3)					Tie (Note: Ron Rossen / Bob Wegner)		
1965	Ken Stanton	Dennis Reiner					Ron Rossen (2)		
1966	Dean Oliver	Gary Tucker					Bob Wegner (2)		
1967	Larry Mahan	Clyde Vamvoras					Freckles Brown		
1968	Larry Mahan (2)	Jim Houston					George Paul		
1969	Larry Mahan (3)	Royce Smith					Bobby Berger		
1970	Larry Mahan (4)	John Edwards					Gary Leffew		
1971	Bobby Berger	Ace Berry					Bobby Berger (2)		
1972	Phil Lyne	Ace Berry (2)					Phil Lyne		
1973	Larry Mahan (5)	Sandy Kirby					Marvin Paul Shoulders		
1974	Tom R. Ferguson	Jack Ward Jr.					Sandy Kirby		
1975	Sandy Kirby	Jack Ward Jr. (2)					Denny Flynn		
1976	Tom R. Ferguson (2)	Jack Ward Jr. (3)					Don Gay		
1977	Tom R. Ferguson (3)	—N/a					—N/a		
1978	Tom R. Ferguson (4)	Mickey Young					Lyle Sankey		
1979	Tom R. Ferguson (5)	Bruce Ford					John Davis		
1980	Lyle Sankey	Bruce Ford (2)					Lyle Sankey (2)		
1981	Jimmie Cooper	Jimmy Cleveland					Denny Flynn (2)		
1982	Jimmie Cooper (2)	Bruce Ford (3)					Denny Flynn (3)		
1983	Roy Cooper	Tie (Note: Danny Brady / Larry Peabody)					Rickey Lindsey		
1984	Dee Pickett	Lewis Feild					Glen McIlvain		
1985	Tee Woolman	Chuck Logue					Ted Nuce		
1986	Lewis Feild	Lewis Feild (2)					Lane Frost		
1987	Lewis Feild (2)	Bruce Ford (4)					Tuff Hedeman		
1988	Lewis Feild (3)	Dave Appleton					Jim Sharp		
1989	Ty Murray	Marvin Garrett					Tie (Note: Jim Sharp (2) / Tuff Hedeman (2))		
1990	Ty Murray (2)	Chuck Logue (2)					Norman Curry		
1991	Ty Murray (3)	Wayne Herman					Michael Gaffney		
1992	Ty Murray (4)	Deb Greenough					Jim Sharp (3)		
1993	Ty Murray (5)	Ty Murray					Daryl Mills		
1994	Ty Murray (6)	Brian Hawke					Adriano Morães		
1995	Tee Woolman (2)	Marvin Garrett (2)					Jerome Davis		
1996	Herbert Theriot	Mark Garrett					Adriano Morães (2)		
1997	Joe Beaver	Eric Mouton					Scott Mendes		
1998	Herbert Theriot (2)	Mark Gomes					Ty Murray		
1999	Cody Ohl	Lan LaJeunesse					Mike White		
2000	Joe Beaver (2)	Jeffrey Collins					Philip Elkins		
2001	Jesse Bail	Clint Corey					Blue Stone		
2002	Jesse Bail (2)	Jason Jeter					Blue Stone (2)		
2003	Trevor Brazile	Cody Jessee					Greg Potter		
2004	Trevor Brazile (2)	Kelly Timberman					Paulo Crimber		
2005	Ryan Jarrett	Tie (Note: Cimmaron Gerke / Kelly Timberman (2))					Matt Austin		
2006	Joe Beaver (3)	Will Lowe					B.J. Schumacher		
2007	Trevor Brazile (3)	Will Lowe (2)					Wesley Silcox		
2008	Trevor Brazile (4)	Justin McDaniel					J.W. Harris		
2009	Josh Peek	Bobby Mote					Kanin Asay		
2010	Trevor Brazile (5)	Justin McDaniel (2)					J.W. Harris (2)		
2011	Trevor Brazile (6)	Kaycee Feild					L.J. Jenkins		
2012	Trevor Brazile (7)	Kaycee Feild (2)					Beau Schroeder		
2013	Trevor Brazile (8)	Kaycee Feild (3)					Cody Teel		
2014	Trevor Brazile (9)	Kaycee Feild (4)					Sage Kimzey		
2015	Trevor Brazile (10)	Steven Peebles					Cody Teel (2)		
2016	Junior Nogueira	Tim O'Connell					Shane Proctor		
2017	Tuf Cooper	Tim O'Connell (2)					Sage Kimzey (2)		
2018	Trevor Brazile (11)	Tie (Note: Steven Dent / Tim O'Connell (3))					Chase Dougherty		
2019	Stetson Wright	Clayton Biglow					Sage Kimzey (3)		
2020	Stetson Wright (2)	Jess Pope					Colten Fritzlan		
2021	Stetson Wright (3)	Jess Pope (2)					Josh Frost		
2022	Stetson Wright (4)	Jess Pope (3)					Stetson Wright		
2023	Stetson Wright (5)	Keenan Hayes					Ky Hamilton		
2024	Shad Mayfield	Dean Thompson					Josh Frost (2)		
2025	Stetson Wright (6)	Sam Petersen	Tucker Allen	Andrew Ward / Jake Long	Statler Wright	Riley Webb	T.J. Gray	Jess Tierney	Julie Plourde

== Impact on UNLV ==
The Thomas & Mack Center is the home court for the UNLV basketball team. By hosting the NFR, the basketball team plays a few of their away games for about 12 days every December while the NFR is in the Thomas & Mack Center.

== Broadcasting ==
The National Finals Rodeo has been televised consistently since 1974. From that year to 1986, the event was telecast through syndication. From 1987 through 2010, it was broadcast by ESPN, although its coverage was often tape delayed due to coverage of other events. From 2011 through 2013, the NFR was broadcast live on Great American Country (GAC). From 2014 through 2019, it was televised on CBS Sports Network.

Since 2020, the NFR has been televised live on The Cowboy Channel and streamed live on the paywall-subscription-based Cowboy+ app. From 2020 through 2023, it was also televised live on RFD-TV.
