= Mulvane, Kansas =

City in Sedgwick and Sumner County, Kansas

- City
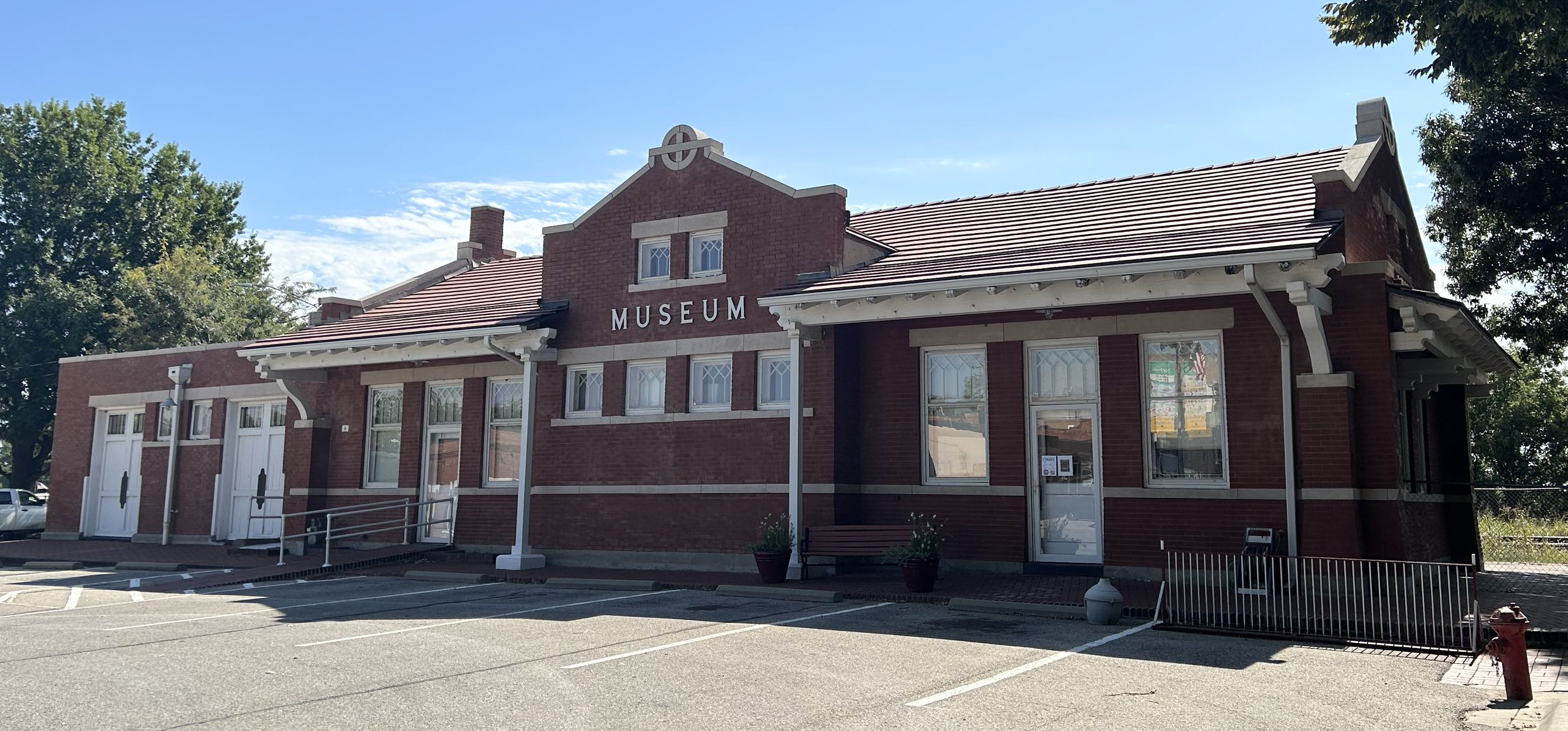
- Mulvane Historical Museum in 2026. The museum is housed in the former Santa Fe Depot which was built in 1910.

- Location within Sedgwick County and Kansas

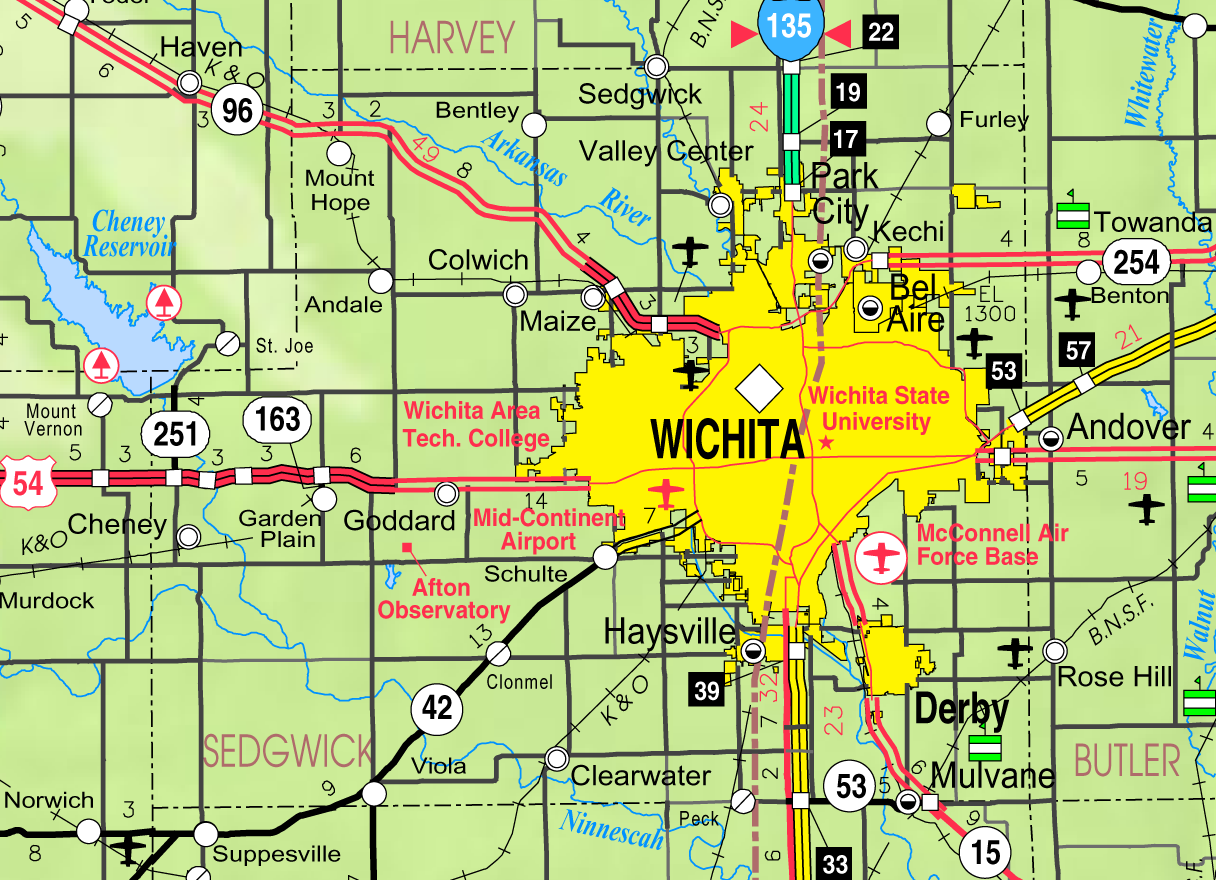
- KDOT map of Sedgwick County (legend)
- Coordinates: 37°29′03″N 97°14′35″W
- Country: United States
- State: Kansas
- Counties: Sedgwick, Sumner
- Founded: 1870s
- Platted: 1879
- Incorporated: 1883
- Named for: Joab Mulvane

Government
  - Mayor: Brent Allen

Area
  - Total: 4.47 sq mi (11.58 km^{2})
  - Land: 4.46 sq mi (11.56 km^{2})
  - Water: 0.0077 sq mi (0.02 km^{2})
- Elevation: 1,263 ft (385 m)

Population (2020)
  - Total: 6,286
  - Density: 1,408/sq mi (543.8/km^{2})
- Time zone: UTC-6 (CST)
  - Summer (DST): UTC-5 (CDT)
- ZIP Code: 67110
- Area code: 316
- FIPS code: 20-49100
- GNIS ID: 2395137
- Website: www.mulvaneks.gov

Mulvane (/məlˈveɪn/ məl-VAYN) is a city in Sedgwick and Sumner counties in the U.S. state of Kansas. As of the 2020 census, the population of the city was 6,286.

== History ==
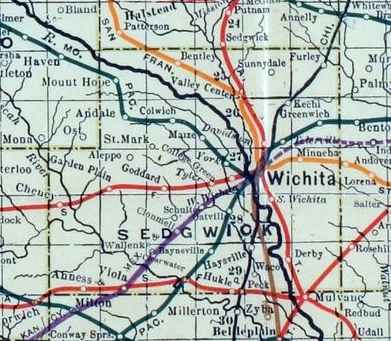
1915 railroad map of Sedgwick County

Mulvane was laid out in 1879 at the junction of five Santa Fe rail lines. It is named for Joab R. Mulvane, a railroad official who was instrumental in bringing the Atchison, Topeka, and Santa Fe Railroad to Mulvane.

Mulvane was changed to a city of the second class on December 20, 2001.

In 2008 and 2009, the city annexed land towards the west side of I-35 (Kansas Turnpike), then the Kansas Star Casino opened on it in 2011.

== Geography ==
According to the United States Census Bureau, the city has a total area of 4.52 square miles (11.71 km^{2}), of which 4.50 square miles (11.65 km^{2}) is land and 0.02 square miles (0.05 km^{2}) is water.

Mulvane's Main Street follows part of the Sedgwick and Sumner county lines, and the town center is approximately five miles west of the spot where Sedgwick, Sumner, Butler and Cowley counties intersect.

== Demographics ==
Historical population
Census	Pop.	Note	%±
1880	215		—
1890	724		236.7%
1900	667		−7.9%
1910	1,084		62.5%
1920	1,239		14.3%
1930	1,042		−15.9%
1940	940		−9.8%
1950	1,387		47.6%
1960	2,981		114.9%
1970	3,185		6.8%
1980	4,254		33.6%
1990	4,674		9.9%
2000	5,155		10.3%
2010	6,111		18.5%
2020	6,286		2.9%
2023 (est.)	6,936		10.3%
U.S. Decennial Census; 2010-2020

Mulvane is a part of the Wichita, KS Metropolitan Statistical Area.

=== 2020 census ===
As of the 2020 census, Mulvane had 6,286 people, 2,338 households, and 1,656 families. The population density was 1,408.8 inhabitants per square mile (543.9/km^{2}). There were 2,465 housing units at an average density of 552.4 per square mile (213.3/km^{2}).

98.9% of residents lived in urban areas, while 1.1% lived in rural areas. Of the households, 38.0% had children under age 18, 54.6% were married-couple households, 14.9% were households with a male householder and no spouse or partner present, and 24.5% were households with a female householder and no spouse or partner present. About 24.4% of households were made up of individuals, and 11.9% had someone living alone who was 65 years of age or older. Of all housing units, 5.2% were vacant; the homeowner vacancy rate was 1.0% and the rental vacancy rate was 6.1%.

Racial composition as of the 2020 census
Race	Number	Percent
White	5,595	89.0%
Black or African American	30	0.5%
American Indian and Alaska Native	63	1.0%
Asian	39	0.6%
Native Hawaiian and Other Pacific Islander	7	0.1%
Some other race	38	0.6%
Two or more races	514	8.2%
Hispanic or Latino (of any race)	307	4.9%

The median age was 37.0 years. 27.8% of residents were under age 18, 7.8% were from 18 to 24, 25.1% were from 25 to 44, 23.2% were from 45 to 64, and 16.1% were age 65 or older. For every 100 females, there were 93.4 males, and for every 100 females age 18 and over, there were 90.3 males.

=== Households and housing ===
The average household size was 2.6 and the average family size was 3.0, based on 2016−2020 American Community Survey estimates.

=== Educational attainment ===
The percent of residents with a bachelor's degree or higher was estimated to be 20.8% of the population.

=== Income and poverty ===
The 2016−2020 5-year American Community Survey estimates show that the median household income was $65,286 (with a margin of error of +/- $16,008) and the median family income was $77,835 (+/- $17,261). Males had a median income of $44,233 (+/- $7,691) versus $28,997 (+/- $6,552) for females. The median income for those above 16 years old was $34,413 (+/- $12,361). Approximately, 5.1% of families and 9.2% of the population were below the poverty line, including 14.1% of those under age 18 and 2.7% of those age 65 or over.

=== 2010 census ===
As of the census of 2010, there were 6,111 people, 2,244 households, and 1,661 families living in the city. The population density was 1,358.0 inhabitants per square mile (524.3/km^{2}). There were 2,357 housing units at an average density of 523.8 per square mile (202.2/km^{2}). The racial makeup of the city was 94.4% White, 0.6% African American, 1.1% Native American, 0.8% Asian, 0.1% Pacific Islander, 0.7% from other races, and 2.4% from two or more races. Hispanic or Latino of any race were 3.5% of the population.

There were 2,244 households, of which 40.4% had children under the age of 18 living with them, 59.3% were married couples living together, 10.5% had a female householder with no husband present, 4.2% had a male householder with no wife present, and 26.0% were non-families. 23.4% of all households were made up of individuals, and 10.5% had someone living alone who was 65 years of age or older. The average household size was 2.70 and the average family size was 3.18.

The median age in the city was 35.1 years. 30.4% of residents were under the age of 18; 6.9% were between the ages of 18 and 24; 25.5% were from 25 to 44; 24.2% were from 45 to 64; and 13.1% were 65 years of age or older. The gender makeup of the city was 48.0% male and 52.0% female.

== Area events and attractions ==
- Mulvane Old Settlers - one of the longest-running community events in Kansas, having started in 1873 (ten years before the town was officially incorporated).
- Doc Sunback Film Festival - annual film festival held in Mulvane, with a focus on independent films and filmmakers from Kansas.
- Kansas Star Casino

== Education ==
=== Primary and secondary ===
The community is served by Mulvane USD 263 public school district. Munson Primary School teaches grades pre-kindergarten through second grade, Mulvane Grade School teaches third through fifth grades, Mulvane Middle School teaches sixth through eighth grades, and Mulvane High School teaches ninth through 12th grades.

=== Colleges and universities ===
Cowley County Community College operates a satellite campus within city limits.

== Notable people ==
- Laura Cobb, United States Navy nurse during World War II
- Dennis Franchione, college football coach
