= Professional Rodeo Cowboys Association =

Rodeo organization

- Sport: Rodeo
- Founded: 1936
- Countries: United States; Canada; Mexico
- Most recent champions: (United States) Stetson Wright, All-Around
- Website: prorodeo.com

The Professional Rodeo Cowboys Association (PRCA) is the largest rodeo organization in the world. It sanctions events in the United States, Canada, and Mexico, with members from said countries, as well as others. Its championship event is the National Finals Rodeo (NFR). The PRCA is headquartered in Colorado Springs, Colorado, United States.

== History ==
The organization was created in 1936 when a group of cowboys walked out of a rodeo at the Boston Garden to protest the actions of rodeo promoter W.T. Johnson, who refused to add the cowboys' entry fees to the rodeo's total purse. Johnson finally gave in to the cowboys' demands, and the successful "strike" led to the formation of the Cowboys' Turtle Association. That name was chosen because, while they were slow to organize, when required they were unafraid to stick out their necks to get what they wanted, like turtles might do. Among the organizers was a woman; Alice Greenough Orr, a four-time national bronc riding champion.

In 1945, the Turtles changed their name to the Rodeo Cowboys Association, and in 1975, the organization became the Professional Rodeo Cowboys Association.

The PRCA staff consists of about 70 full-time employees, but grows to nearly 100 during the peak rodeo season.

The PRCA headquarters, established in 1979 in Colorado Springs, also houses the ProRodeo Hall of Fame and Museum of the American Cowboy.

In 2006, the Cheyenne Frontier Days Hall of Fame inducted the PRCA into its hall of fame.

== Events ==
Events are divided into roughstock and timed events.

- Bareback riding - in this roughstock event, a rider has to stay on a bucking horse and is only allowed to hang on with a "rigging" attached by a cinch and latigos. The rider must stay on the horse for eight seconds to be considered a successful ride. Each successful ride is then judged for a maximum score of 100 points. The more difficult the horse is to ride and the more control the contestant has during the ride, the higher the score. After a successful ride, two pickup riders in the arena assist the contestant by helping him safely dismount the still-moving horse. The bareback rider with the highest score wins.
- Steer wrestling - in this timed event, a rider jumps off his horse onto a Corriente steer and 'wrestles' it to the ground by grabbing it by the horns. The contestant that wrestles the steer to the ground the fastest wins. This is probably the single most physically dangerous event in rodeo for the cowboy, who runs a high risk of jumping off a running horse head first and missing the steer, or of having the thrown steer land on top of him, sometimes horns first.
- Team roping - this timed event is the only team event in professional rodeo. Two ropers capture and restrain a Corriente steer whose horns have been reinforced for protection. One horse and rider, the "header," lassos a running steer's horns, while the other horse and rider, the "heeler," lassos the steer's two hind legs. Once the animal is captured, the riders face each other and lightly pull the steer between them, so that both ropes are taut. The team that ropes their steer the fastest wins. This technique originated from methods of capture and restraint for treatment used on a ranch.
- Saddle bronc riding - this roughstock event is similar to bareback riding, but the rider uses a specialized western saddle without a horn (for safety) as well as a bronc rein and has to stay on the bucking horse for eight seconds. Like in bareback riding, two pickup riders attempt to help the contestant dismount the still-moving horse after a successful ride. Also like bareback riding, each successful ride is then judged for a maximum score of 100 points. The more difficult the horse is to ride and the more control the contestant has during the ride, the higher the score. The saddle bronc rider with the highest score wins.
- Tie-down roping - this timed event, also called calf roping, is based on ranch work in which calves are roped for branding, medical treatment, or other purposes. It is the oldest of rodeo's timed events. The cowboy ropes a running calf around the neck with a lariat, and his horse stops and sets back on the rope while the cowboy dismounts, runs to the calf, throws it to the ground and ties three feet together. The cowboy then raises both hands to indicate completion. If the calf falls when roped, the roper must lose time waiting for the calf to get back to its feet so that the roper can do the work. The job of the horse is to hold the calf steady on the rope. The contestant that ropes his calf the fastest wins. A well-trained calf-roping horse will slowly back up while the cowboy ties the calf, to help keep the lariat snug.
- Bull riding - in this roughstock event, the contestant attempts to ride a full-grown bucking bull for eight seconds. Like the bucking horse events, each successful ride is then judged for a maximum score of 100 points. The more difficult the bull is to ride and the more control the contestant has during the ride, the higher the score. The rider with the highest score wins. Although skills and equipment similar to those needed for bareback bronc riding are required, the event differs considerably from horse riding competition due to the danger involved. Because bulls are unpredictable and may attack a fallen rider, rodeo clowns, now known as "bullfighters", work during bull-riding competition to distract the bulls and help prevent injury to competitors.
- steer roping - in this timed event, a cowboy and horse pursue a Corriente steer whose horns have been reinforced for protection. The cowboy must lasso the steer's horns and then ties the rope to his saddle. He must stop his horse promptly so that it throws the steer to the ground. The cowboy then quickly dismounts in order to tie three of the steer's legs together. He raises both hands to indicate completion. The fastest time wins.
- Barrel racing - is a timed speed and agility event. In barrel racing, horse and rider gallop around a cloverleaf pattern of barrels, making agile turns without knocking the barrels over. The contestant that successfully passes the cloverleaf pattern the fastest wins. In professional, collegiate and high school rodeo, barrel racing is an exclusively women's sport, though men and boys occasionally compete at local O-Mok-See competition. Barrel racing takes place with other PRCA sanctioned events, but it is sanctioned by the Women's Professional Rodeo Association (WPRA). Results are shown on that web site.
- Breakaway roping – is a timed event and variation of calf roping where a calf is roped, but not thrown and tied. The roper attempts to throw a lasso around the neck of the calf. Once the rope is around the calf's neck, the roper signals the horse to stop suddenly. The rope is tied to the saddle horn with a string. When the calf hits the end of the rope, the rope is pulled tight and the string breaks. The breaking of the string marks the end of the run. The fastest time wins. In professional and collegiate rodeo, breakaway roping is exclusively a women's sport. Breakaway roping started becoming a regular event at some PRCA rodeos in 2019, making it along with barrel racing the two female events. By 2025, it was held in 560 PRCA rodeos. Like barrel racing, breakaway roping is sanctioned by the WPRA and results are shown on its website.
- All-around - the All-around cowboy is actually an award, not an event. It is awarded to the highest money winner in two or more events.

Note: Steer roping is publicized separately and its finals are held separately at the National Finals Steer Roping (NFSR). The National Breakaway Finals (NBF) is held to determine the WPRA's world champion breakaway roper.

== Tours and championships ==
=== Circuit System ===
There are 12 U.S. regional circuits in the PRCA; Montana, Mountain States, Wilderness, Columbia River, California, Turquoise, Texas, Prairie, Badlands, Great Lakes, Southeast, and First Frontier. Contestants compete in their respective regional circuits and the top ones qualify for each region's circuit finals rodeos. Points are achieved for the top competitors in each of the circuit rodeo events held throughout the year. At the conclusion of each circuit finals rodeo, the season champion, as well as the circuit finals average champion qualify for the main championship event of the circuit system, the NFR Open. The winner in each event at the NFR Open is the U.S. National Champion for their respective event. In addition to the nine individual event winners, including heading and heeling team ropers, there is also the all-around cowboy champion, who wins the most money in two or more events. All ten winners receive the National Circuit championship belt buckle. Each different circuit also competes at the NFR Open as a team and the best performing circuit wins the PRCA National Circuit Team Championship.

The main championship event for the circuit system was previously known as the National Circuit Finals Rodeo (NCFR). The NCFR was held every spring from 1987 through 2010 in Pocatello, Idaho, before moving to Oklahoma City, Oklahoma, in 2011; Guthrie, Oklahoma, in 2014; and then to Kissimmee, Florida, in 2015. In 2020, due to the COVID-19 pandemic, the NCFR had to be moved to a different date and location. It was ultimately held in Greeley, Colorado, in September. The event itself was closed to the public and the seats were filled with socially distanced cardboard cutouts of people. In 2021, The NCFR returned to Kissimmee, Florida, and took place during its normal run in the springtime, but consisted of a limited and socially distanced crowd due to the continuity of the pandemic. In 2022, the National Circuit Finals Rodeo was renamed as the NFR Open and now takes place every July at the Pikes Peak or Bust Rodeo in Colorado Springs, Colorado.

Since 2016, the PRCA has had a partnership with the Federación Mexicana de Rodeo (FMR) (Mexican Rodeo Federation). Rodeo contestants compete in a series of events co-sanctioned by the PRCA and FMR called the PRCA-FMR Tour. It has a year-end finals event and the tour champions and finals champions from the previous calendar year competed at the NCFR beginning in 2017. This lasted through 2020, until the COVID-19 pandemic forced the PRCA's partnership with the FMR to pause for three years. Since 2023, the PRCA-FMR Tour champions again compete at the NFR Open. The season champions of the Maple Leaf Circuit, which was forged between a partnership with the PRCA and Canadian Professional Rodeo Association (CPRA), first competed at the NCFR in 2020 and have consistently competed at the NFR Open ever since.

=== ProRodeo Playoff Series ===
The top cowboys and cowgirls compete in the PRCA's 60 largest regular-season rodeos where they try to earn points towards the tour finale in September; the Cinch Playoffs Governor's Cup in Sioux Falls, South Dakota. The finale was held for several years at the Washington State Fair in Puyallup, Washington. In 2020, as a result of the COVID-19 pandemic, the finale was held in Rapid City, South Dakota. In 2021, it moved to the California Rodeo Salinas in Salinas, California. The finale returned to Puyallup in 2022. Since 2023, it is separated into two halves in two different cities. The first half, simply titled the Cinch Playoffs, is held at the Washington State Fair in Puyallup, Washington, in early September. The second half, the Cinch Playoffs Governor's Cup, is held in Sioux Falls, South Dakota, in late September, and is the last regular season event of the PRCA calendar. The Cinch Jeans company is the Playoffs' title sponsor.

The tour was previously known as the ProRodeo Tour before changing to the Playoff Series in 2022 and ProRodeo Playoff Series in 2026. While money won on the tour does count toward the world standings for the National Finals Rodeo (NFR), The ProRodeo Playoff Series is points based. The competitor with the highest total points in each rodeo event at the end of the season is crowned the ProRodeo Playoff Series Champion.

=== World's Toughest Rodeo ===
This tour consists of PRCA bareback bronc riders, saddle bronc riders, bull riders, and WPRA barrel racers competing in select cities of the United States (mainly in the Midwest and Southeast) where rodeos are traditionally not held. The tour is held during the winter and spring. Money won at each tour stop counts towards the PRCA world standings. The World's Toughest Rodeo is run by Cinch Jeans, based in Denver, Colorado.

=== Xtreme Bulls ===
What started out as an unsanctioned, one-night-only, stand-alone bull riding event held in conjunction with Ellensburg, Washington's Ellensburg Rodeo in 2002, became a full-fledged PRCA-sanctioned tour in 2003. Xtreme Bulls events are held in conjunction with less than a handful of the PRCA's several hundreds of annual rodeos. 40 PRCA bull riders compete in a select rodeo arena in a one-two-day competition, and the top 12 riders based on scores come back to the championship round. The rider with the most points on two or three bulls wins the event. The PRCA crowns an Xtreme Bulls tour champion every year. This is the rider who wins the most money on tour. The Xtreme Bulls tour has Division 2 events where riders try to qualify to earn spots on the main Division 1 events. Bull riders must compete in at least 40 complete PRCA rodeos in order for the money won on the Xtreme Bulls tour to count in the world standings towards the National Finals Rodeo.

In 2003, the inaugural Xtreme Bulls Tour Finale was held in Kissimmee, Florida. In 2004, the tour finale was held in conjunction with the Ellensburg Rodeo. In 2005, it was held in Reno, Nevada. From 2006 through 2008, it was held in Indianapolis, Indiana. From 2009 through 2019, it was consistently held in conjunction with the Ellensburg Rodeo. In 2020, because of the COVID-19 pandemic, the Ellensburg Rodeo was cancelled, and thus the Xtreme Bulls Tour Finale had to be moved somewhere else. It was ultimately held in Nephi, Utah. Since 2021, the Xtreme Bulls Tour Finale has taken place in Pendleton, Oregon; held in conjunction with the Pendleton Round-Up.

=== Xtreme Broncs ===
First approved by the PRCA in 2016, this tour features only saddle bronc riding competition. Like the Xtreme Bulls tour, these events are held in conjunction with a very small amount of the PRCA's several hundreds of annual regular season rodeos. At the Xtreme Broncs Tour Finale, held every August since 2019 in Rapid City, South Dakota, the top 12 saddle bronc riders in the PRCA world standings, plus the top 12 saddle bronc riders in the Xtreme Broncs tour standings not already in the top 12 PRCA world standings compete at the event. Money won on the Xtreme Broncs tour counts towards the PRCA world standings for the National Finals Rodeo.

Unlike the Xtreme Bulls tour, which has events in PRCA-rodeo arenas throughout the United States, the Xtreme Broncs tour is mostly concentrated in the Inland Northwest (Montana, Wyoming, eastern Washington, eastern Oregon), the Dakotas, and the western Canadian province of Alberta due to the regions' deep saddle-bronc-riding heritage and proximity to several of the top stock contractors who provide bucking horses. The tour occasionally holds events in other states.

=== Legacy Steer Roping ===
Since 2019, the PRCA has sanctioned steer roping events for contestants aged 50 and over called the Legacy Steer Roping tour. Ropers must compete in at least four Legacy Steer Roping events and have won at least one dollar in each event in order to qualify for the Legacy Steer Roping Finals held in November in Mulvane, Kansas, for the chance of being crowned the tour champion.

=== National Circuit Finals Steer Roping ===
The National Circuit Finals Steer Roping (NCFSR) has been held in Torrington, Wyoming, since its inaugural year in 2010. The top 35 steer ropers from the PRCA regional American circuits that include steer roping as an event compete at the annual two-day event for the chance of winning the U.S. National Steer Roping title.

=== National Finals Steer Roping ===
At the end of the regular season, the top 15 steer ropers in the PRCA world standings compete at the National Finals Steer Roping (NFSR). This annual event held every November in Mulvane, Kansas, is separate from the National Finals Rodeo (NFR) and different from the National Circuit Finals Steer Roping (NCFSR). After two days of competition, the contestant who has won the most money throughout the season, including at the NFSR is crowned the PRCA world champion steer roper. Since 2019, the Legacy Steer Roping Finals have been held in conjunction with the NFSR.

=== Permit Finals ===
The PRCA held the Permit Member of the Year Challenge in which the top five permit holders in each of the standard male rodeo events at the end of the regular season competed for the chance of being crowned the Permit Member of the Year in their respective events. This one-day event was held every December at the South Point Hotel Arena in Las Vegas, Nevada, just shortly before the start of the National Finals Rodeo. However, because of COVID-19 restrictions in Nevada, the 2020 edition of the event took place at Cowtown Coliseum in Fort Worth, Texas. The Permit Member of the Year Challenge returned to the South Point Hotel Arena in Las Vegas in 2021. First time PRCA members compete on a permit, and must win a certain amount of money before they earn their full-time PRCA membership card. The top five money-earning permit holders competed in two rounds each and the ones who had earned the most money throughout the year were each crowned the Permit Member of the Year. The Permit Member of the Year Challenge had been held since 2009, although in its first five years, only the roughstock events (bareback riding, saddle bronc riding and bull riding) were featured. The timed events (steer wrestling, team roping and tie-down roping) were added in 2014.

The Permit Member of the Year Challenge in Las Vegas crowned the year-end Permit Members of the Year from 2009 through 2021. However, in 2022, the permit championship event was changed. Since that year, the Permit Finals has been held at the Heart O' Texas Fair & Rodeo in Waco, Texas, in October as a three-day event. The six primary PRCA male events (bareback riding, steer wrestling, team roping, saddle bronc riding, tie-down roping, and bull riding), as well as the two female WPRA events included at PRCA rodeos (breakaway roping and barrel racing) are featured, and the top ten permit holders in each event compete throughout the Permit Finals for the chance of winning the Permit Member of the Year title in each respective event. The Permit Member of the Year Challenge in Las Vegas continues to take place before the start of the National Finals Rodeo. However, it now features the top five permit holders in each rodeo event at the conclusion of the Permit Finals and is held as a regular-season event.

=== National Finals Rodeo ===
The top 15 money winners in each PRCA discipline (including the top 15 "headers" and "heelers" in team roping) and the top 15 WPRA barrel racers at the end of the regular season earn a trip to the National Finals Rodeo every December. The event is commonly called the National Finals or NFR. The inaugural National Finals Rodeo in 1959 took place in Dallas, Texas, and the event would remain there through 1961. From 1962 to 1964, the NFR took place in Los Angeles, California. From 1965 to 1984, it took place in Oklahoma City, Oklahoma. Since 1985, the NFR has been held at the Thomas & Mack Center in Las Vegas, Nevada. However, in 2020 due to COVID-19 restrictions in Nevada, the NFR was temporarily moved to Globe Life Field in Arlington, Texas, with a limited and socially distanced crowd for each day of competition. The NFR returned to the Thomas & Mack Center in Las Vegas in 2021.

Rodeo action is held over 10 consecutive days at the National Finals, with the top money winner for the year crowned the year's PRCA World Champion in each discipline at the end of the NFR. Because of the large amount of money (10 million dollars) at stake in the NFR, the leaders in each event going into the NFR are often dethroned for the year's championship at that event.

== Broadcasting ==
Throughout its history, PRCA events were televised on channels such as ABC, NBC, CBS, ESPN, TNN, Prime Sports, the Outdoor Life Network, the Outdoor Channel, Fox Sports Networks, Great American Country, RFD-TV, MAVTV, and CBS Sports Network.

Since 2020, PRCA events have been televised live on The Cowboy Channel and streamed live on the paywall-subscription-based Cowboy+ app.

== Champions and hall of fame ==
The National Finals Rodeo and the National Finals Steer Roping award their champions and awards yearly at the end of the year and those awards are tracked in a separate article.

The PRCA's board runs the Hall of Fame. More than 100 people and livestock are nominated each year, but only a few are selected.

== Miss Rodeo America ==
The Miss Rodeo America pageant is held annually in Las Vegas, Nevada, every December. Miss Rodeo America is the official spokesperson for the PRCA. It is held alongside the National Finals Rodeo.

== See also ==
- List of Professional Rodeo Cowboys Association Champions
- List of Professional Bull Riders Champions
- List of ProRodeo Hall of Fame inductees
- Bull Riding Hall of Fame
- Professional Bull Riders
- ProRodeo Hall of Fame
- American Bucking Bull
- International Professional Rodeo Association
- Bull Riders Only
- Championship Bull Riding
- Women's Professional Rodeo Association
- Canadian Professional Rodeo Association
- Federación Mexicana de Rodeo
- Australian Professional Rodeo Association
