= List of ProRodeo Hall of Fame inductees =

The Professional Rodeo Cowboys Association (PRCA) created the ProRodeo Hall of Fame and Museum of the American Cowboy to recognize extraordinary athletes, both human and animal, in the sport of rodeo. Induction into the ProRodeo Hall of Fame is the highest honor for rodeo contestants participating in the PRCA today. Contestants are honored in several categories on a yearly basis. The hall opened its doors in 1979. Since 1979, 307 people, 40 animals and 35 rodeo committees have been inducted. More than 100 are nominated each year, but only a few are selected.

Both the PRCA and the ProRodeo Hall of Fame are located in Colorado Springs, Colorado. The ProRodeo Hall of Fame and Museum of the American Cowboy informs the public about rodeo.

== Inductees ==
=== Human ===
Human ProRodeo Hall of Fame inductees
Year	Name	Category	Birthdate	Death Date	From	Ref(s)
2022	Trevor Brazile	All-Around	November 16, 1976 Amarillo, TX			
2017	Buck Rutherford*	All-Around	September 24, 1929 Lenapah, OK	April 28, 1988 (aged 59) Tulsa, OK		
2016	Dave Appleton	All-Around	January 30, 1960 (age 66) Clermont, Queensland, AUS			
2015	Tom Nesmith*	All-Around	January 28, 1935 McAlester, OK	October 16, 1972 (aged 37) Sulphur, OK		
2014	Pete Grubb*	All-Around	October 26, 1913 May, ID	February 12, 1969 (aged 55) La Honda, OK		
2013	John Bowman*	All-Around	July 31, 1900 Rogers, AR	August 13, 1959 (aged 59) San Francisco, CA		
2009	Leonard Ward*	All-Around	August 21, 1903 Chehalis, WA	February 15, 1985 (aged 81) Dufur, OR		
2008	Paul Tierney	All-Around	April 9, 1952 (age 74) Kearney, NE			
2006	Chris Lybbert	All-Around	March 14, 1954 (age 72) Ephrata, WA			
2005	Jimmie Cooper	All-Around	November 4, 1956 (age 70) Hobbs, NM			
2003	Dee Pickett	All-Around	September 8, 1955 (age 71) San Diego, CA			
2003	Todd Whatley*	All-Around	December 18, 1920 Rufe, OK	June 17, 1966 (aged 45) Hugo, OK		
2002	Joe Beaver	All-Around	October 13, 1965 (age 61) Victoria, TX			
2001	Paul Carney*	All-Around	September 21, 1912 Galeton, CO	June 24, 1950 (aged 37) Flagstaff, AZ		
2000	Ty Murray	All-Around	October 11, 1969 (age 57) Phoenix, AZ		Stephenville, TX	
2000	Chuck Sheppard*	All-Around	April 16, 1916 Globe, AZ	June 14, 2005 (aged 89) Prescott, AZ		
1999	Tom Ferguson	All-Around	December 20, 1950 (age 75) Tahlequah, OK			
1995	Fritz Truan*	All-Around	November 12, 1915 Seeley, CA	February 28, 1945 (aged 29) KIA Japan		
1993	Benny Reynolds*	All-Around	March 5, 1938 Twin Bridges, MT	February 14, 2014 (aged 75) Twin Bridges, MT		
1992	Lewis Feild*	All-Around	October 28, 1956 Salt Lake City, UT	February 15, 2016 (aged 59) Elk Ridge, UT	Elk Ridge, UT	
1991	Louis Brooks*	All-Around	December 9, 1916 Fletcher, OK	August 6, 1983 (aged 66) Stephenville, TX		
1990	Gerald Roberts*	All-Around	October 5, 1919 Council Grove, KS	December 31, 2004 (aged 85) Abilene, KS		
1989	Gene Rambo*	All-Around	June 12, 1929 San Miguel, CA	January 1, 1988 (aged 58) Parkfield, CA		
1979	Everett Bowman*	All-Around	July 12, 1899 Hope, NM	October 25, 1971 (aged 72) near Baghdad, AZ		
1979	Clay Carr*	All-Around	April 17, 1919 Farmersville, CA	April 1957 Visalia, CA		
1979	Bill Linderman*	All-Around	April 13, 1920 Bridger, MT	November 11, 1965 (aged 45)	Red Lodge, MT	
1979	Phil Lyne	All-Around	January 18, 1947 San Antonio, TX	August 14, 2026 (aged 79) Cotulla, TX		
1979	Larry Mahan	All-Around	November 21, 1943 Salem, OR	May 7, 2023 (aged 79) Valley View, TX		
1979	Jim Shoulders*	All-Around	May 13, 1928 Tulsa, OK	June 20, 2007 (aged 79) Henryetta, OK		
1979	Casey Tibbs*	All-Around	March 5, 1929 Fort Pierre, SD	January 28, 1990 (aged 60) Ramona, CA		
2025	Jeff Collins	Bareback Riding	March 2, 1969 (age 57) Kansas City, MO			
2024	Kaycee Feild	Bareback Riding	March 4, 1987 (age 39) Payson, UT			
2022	Bobby Mote	Bareback Riding	June 3, 1976 Portland, OR			
2019	Larry Peabody	Bareback Riding	October 23, 1957 (age 69) Hardin, MT			
2018	Deb Greenough	Bareback Riding	May 17, 1963 (age 63) Red Lodge, MT			
2016	Bud Linderman*	Bareback Riding	February 22, 1922 Bridger, MT	March 13, 1961 (aged 39) Phoenix, AZ		
2015	Mark Garrett	Bareback Riding	August 19, 1965 (age 61) Gettysburg, SD			
2014	Wayne Herman	Bareback Riding	January 10, 1964 (age 62) Golden Valley, ND		Dickinson, ND	
2013	Chuck Logue	Bareback Riding	December 2, 1960 (age 65) Upland, CA			
2011	Lan LaJeunesse	Bareback Riding	November 22, 1970 (age 55) Bountiful, UT			
2010	Paul Mayo*	Bareback Riding	April 8, 1942 Grinnell, IA	January 24, 2021 (aged 78) Stephenville, TX		
2005	Chris LeDoux*	Bareback Riding	October 2, 1948 Biloxi, MS	March 9, 2005 (aged 56) Casper, WY	Kaycee, WY	
2004	Clint Corey	Bareback Riding	November 29, 1961 (age 64) Bremerton, WA			
2002	Clyde Vamvoras*	Bareback Riding	January 4, 1942 Lake Charles, LA	November 1, 1985 (aged 43) Billings, MT		
1998	Marvin Garrett	Bareback Riding	July 28, 1963 Belle Fourche, SD			
1995	Jack Ward	Bareback Riding	May 21, 1948 (age 78) Caldwell, KS			
1994	J.C. Trujillo	Bareback Riding	May 10, 1948 (age 78) Prescott, AZ			
1993	Bruce Ford	Bareback Riding	October 7, 1952 (age 74) Greeley, CO			
1979	Eddy Akridge*	Bareback Riding	January 8, 1929 Pampa, TX	July 25, 2011 (aged 82) Las Vegas, NV		
1979	Joe Alexander	Bareback Riding	November 4, 1943 (age 83) Jackson Hole, WY			
1979	Jack Buschbom*	Bareback Riding	October 6, 1927 State Center, IA	May 15, 2011 (aged 83) Pierre, SD		
1979	John Hawkins*	Bareback Riding	May 22, 1930 Elk City, OK	March 17, 2016 (aged 85) Eugene, OR		
1979	Jim Houston	Bareback Riding	February 25, 1941 (age 85) Omaha, NE			
1979	Sonny Tureman*	Bareback Riding	November 4, 1918 Prairie City, OR	October 18, 1995 (aged 76) Okedale, OR		
2026	Loretta Manuel	Barrel Racing	August 19, 1939 (age 87) Pulaski County, IN			
2026	Mary Burger	Barrel Racing	August 18, 1948 (age 78) Decatur, IN			
2025	Joyce Loomis Kernek	Barrel Racing	September 12, 1942 (age 84) Silver City, NM			
2024	Jeana Day	Barrel Racing	October 24, 1954 Woodward, OK			
2024	Marlene McRae	Barrel Racing	January 15, 1957 Rocky Ford, CO			
2023	Sherry Combs Johnson	Barrel Racing	August 16, 1938 Duncan, OK			
2022	Ardith Bruce*	Barrel Racing	July 22, 1931 Clay Center, KS	June 22, 2022 (aged 90) Fountain, CO		
2020	Martha Josey	Barrel Racing	March 11, 1938 Longview, TX			
2019	Sammy Thurman Brackenbury	Barrel Racing	December 11, 1933 Wickieup, AZ	December 26, 2024 (aged 91) California		
2019	Jimmie Gibbs Munroe	Barrel Racing	April 15, 1952 (age 74) Clifton, TX			
2018	Billie McBride*	Barrel Racing	March 4, 1927 Copperas Cove, TX	May 10, 2017 (aged 90) San Angelo, TX		
2018	Kristie Peterson	Barrel Racing	October 10, 1955 (age 71) Dayton, OH			
2017	Wanda Harper Bush*	Barrel Racing	October 6, 1931 Mason, TX	December 29, 2015 (aged 84) Mason, TX	Mason, TX	
2017	Charmayne James	Barrel Racing	June 23, 1970 (age 56) Amarillo, TX			
2026	Jerome Davis	Bull Riding	August 10, 1972 (age 54) Colorado Springs, CO		Archdale, NC	
2024	Blue Stone*	Bull Riding	May 26, 1978 Ogden, UT	March 13, 2022 (aged 43) Willard, UT		
2020	Butch Kirby	Bull Riding	April 24, 1955 (age 71) Woodstown, NJ			
2019	Doug Brown	Bull Riding	March 8, 1946 (age 80) Buckley, WA			
2017	Cody Custer	Bull Riding	August 30, 1965 (age 61) Kingman, AZ			
2016	John Quintana*	Bull Riding	December 3, 1947 Creswell, OK	March 25, 2013 (aged 65) Queensland, AUS		
2015	Bob Wegner*	Bull Riding	March 10, 1934 Ponca City, OK	March 30, 2014 (aged 80) Bandera, TX		
2012	Frank Schneider*	Bull Riding	January 28, 1912 Madera, CA	March 31, 1983 (aged 71) Los Banos, CA		
2009	Ted Nuce	Bull Riding	January 19, 1961 (age 65) Manteca, CA			
2007	Ronnie Rossen*	Bull Riding	July 7, 1937 Ogallala, NE	August 16, 1991 (aged 54) Rocky Ford, CO		
2006	Jim Sharp	Bull Riding	October 6, 1965 (age 61) Kermit, TX			
2002	Gary Leffew	Bull Riding	September 23, 1944 (age 82) Santa Maria, CA			
1997	Richard "Tuff" Hedeman	Bull Riding	March 2, 1963 (age 63) El Paso, TX			
1996	Charlie Sampson	Bull Riding	July 2, 1957 (age 69) Los Angeles, CA			
1992	Johnie Schneider*	Bull Riding	May 3, 1904 Stockton, CA	April 4, 1982 (aged 77)		
1990	Lane Frost*	Bull Riding	October 12, 1963 La Junta, Colorado	July 30, 1989 (aged 25) Cheyenne, WY		
1989	Dick Griffith*	Bull Riding	September 13, 1913 Canton, OK	August 10, 1984 (aged 70) Wickenburg, AZ		
1979	Freckles Brown*	Bull Riding	January 28, 1921 Wheatland, WY	March 20, 1987 (aged 66)		
1979	Don Gay	Bull Riding	September 18, 1953 (age 73) Mesquite, TX			
1979	George Paul*	Bull Riding	March 5, 1947 Del Rio, TX	July 30, 1970 (aged 23) Kemmerer, WY		
1979	Ken Roberts*	Bull Riding	January 22, 1918 Council Grove, KS	August 13, 1975 (aged 57) Strong City, KS		
1979	Smoky Snyder*	Bull Riding	June 1, 1908 Cripple Creek, Colorado	October 24, 1965 (aged 57) Taft, CA		
1979	Harry Tompkins*	Bull Riding	October 5, 1927 Furnace Woods, NY	June 29, 2018 (aged 90) Stephenville, TX		
2026	Keith Isley	Contract Personnel	October 9, 1957 (age 69) Goldston, NC			
2025	Skipper Voss*	Contract Personnel	March 15, 1944 Alvin, TX	November 17, 2026 (aged 82) Waco, TX		
2024	Darrell Diefenbach	Contract Personnel	March 7, 1974 (age 52) Kilkivan, Queensland, AUS			
2023	Kenny Clabaugh*	Contract Personnel	January 17, 1946 Gillette, WY	December 31, 2024 (aged 78) Gillette, WY		
2022	Rick Young*	Contract Personnel	March 3, 1934 Houston, TX	March 20, 2026 (aged 92)		
2020	Sunni Deb Backstrom	Contract Personnel	May 11, 1953 Butte, Montana			
2019	Tommy Lucia*	Contract Personnel	June 1, 1941 Minneapolis, MN	June 1, 2016 (aged 75) Weatherford, TX		
2018	Leon Coffee	Contract Personnel	October 11, 1954 (age 72) Blanco, TX			
2017	Randy Corley	Contract Personnel	November 22, 1951 (age 74) Miles City, MT			
2016	Phil Gardenhire*	Contract Personnel	September 29, 1952 Poteau, OK	April 14, 1999 (aged 46) Heavener, OK		
2015	Hendricks Brothers*	Contract Personnel	January 26, 1924 (age 102) twins, Springfield, MO	Lee January 1, 2017 (aged 92) Phoenix, AZ Byron died 1996		
2014	Miles Hare	Contract Personnel	August 17, 1955 (age 71) Gordon, NE			
2013	Joe Baumgartner	Contract Personnel	September 9, 1966 (age 60) Oakland, CA			
2012	Jon Taylor	Contract Personnel	August 22, 1941 (age 85) Orange, CA			
2011	J.W. Stoker*	Contract Personnel	September 30, 1927 Colorado Springs, CO	April 21, 2022 (aged 94) Weatherford, TX		
2010	Rex Dunn*	Contract Personnel	December 31, 1955 Wichita Falls, TX	October 8, 2012 (aged 56) Hastings, OK		
2008	Leon Adams*	Contract Personnel	July 3, 1930 Stuart, OK	October 30, 2017 (aged 87) Stuart, OK		
2008	Vicki Adams	Contract Personnel	May 13, 1951 (age 75) Toppenish, WA			
2007	Dorothy Apodaca*	Contract Personnel	September 23, 1923 Salida, CO	March 16, 1992 (aged 68) Casper, WY		
2007	Lecile Harris*	Contract Personnel	November 6, 1936 Lake Cormorant, MS	February 12, 2020 (aged 83) MS		
2006	Rob Smets	Contract Personnel	September 11, 1959 (age 67) Palo Alto, CA		Merkel, TX	
2005	Slim Pickens*	Contract Personnel	June 29, 1919 Kingsburg, CA	December 8, 1983 (aged 64) Modesto, CA		
2004	Bob Tallman	Contract Personnel	October 25, 1947 (age 79) Winnemucca, NV			
2004	June Ivory*	Contract Personnel	June 17, 1931 Pampa, TX	November 9, 2004 (aged 73) Pampa, TX		
2003	Nancy Sheppard*	Contract Personnel	December 29, 1929 Fort Worth, TX	April 8, 2026 (aged 96) Globe, Arizona		
2003	Cecil Cornish*	Contract Personnel	September 28, 1909 Waukomis, OK	December 4, 2003 (aged 94) Enid, OK		
2002	Quail Dobbs*	Contract Personnel	August 27, 1941 Albany, TX	January 15, 2014 (aged 72) Coahoma, TX	Coahoma, TX	
2002	Edith Happy Connelly*	Contract Personnel	October 16, 1925 Boston, MA	February 28, 1999 (aged 73) Newhall, CA		
2002	Jay Sisler*	Contract Personnel	February 20, 1926 Gern County, Idaho	July 8, 1995 (aged 69) Emmett, Idaho		
2001	Jo Decker*	Contract Personnel	March 30, 1930 Texas	November 5, 2010 (aged 80) Clayton, OK	San Angelo, TX	
2001	Tom Hadley*	Contract Personnel	October 6, 1927 Lawton, OK	June 2, 2008 (aged 80) Mason, TX		
2001	Jerry Olson*	Contract Personnel	November 22, 1935 Sturgis, SD	September 13, 2017 (aged 81) Belle Fourche, SD		
2000	George Doak	Contract Personnel	George May 13, 1928 (age 98) Fort Worth, TX			
2000	Junior Meek*	Contract Personnel	Junior April 4, 1937 Cleburne, TX	Junior January 5, 2006 (aged 69) Fort Worth, TX		
1999	Hadley Barrett*	Contract Personnel	September 18, 1929 North Platte, NE	March 2, 2017 (aged 87) Denver, CO		
1998	Andy Womack*	Contract Personnel	January 10, 1907 Flat Creek, TN	January 15, 1992 (aged 85) Phoenix, AZ		
1997	Gene Clark*	Contract Personnel	March 27, 1926 Seminole, OK	Redmond, OR		
1997	Bobby Clark	Contract Personnel	March 24, 1930 (age 96) Seminole, OR			
1996	Pete Logan*	Contract Personnel	December 4, 1915 Junction, IL	October 4, 1993 (aged 77) Townsend, MT		
1995	Ellen Backstrom*	Contract Personnel	September 9, 1929 Missoula, MT	March 22, 1988 (aged 58) Wickensburg, AZ		
1995	Chuck Henson*	Contract Personnel	February 4, 1931 Arcadia, FL	August 11, 2018 (aged 87) Tucson, AZ		
1994	Montie Montana*	Contract Personnel	June 21, 1910 Wolf Point, MT	May 28, 1998 (aged 87) Agua Dulce, CA		
1993	Glenn Randall*	Contract Personnel	December 25, 1908 Melbeta, NE	May 5, 1992 (aged 83) Newhall, CA		
1990	Mel Lambert*	Contract Personnel	June 6, 1920 Portland, OR	March 3, 1999 (aged 78) Turner, OR		
1990	Wilbur Plaugher*	Contract Personnel	March 13, 1922 Lima, OH	January 2, 2018 (aged 95) Sanger, CA		
1989	Chuck Parkison*	Contract Personnel	December 30, 1918 Rapid City, SD	July 27, 1988 (aged 69) Cheyenne, WY		
1979	Jasbo Fulkerson*	Contract Personnel	July 31, 1904 Midlothian, TX	January 11, 1949 (aged 44) Saginaw, TX		
1979	Dudley J. Gaudin*	Contract Personnel	October 28, 1929 Baton Rouge, LA	June 11, 2015 (aged 85) Springs Branch, TX		
1979	Homer Holcomb*	Contract Personnel	November 7, 1896 Sioux City, IA	November 15, 1971 (aged 43) Moyie Springs, ID		
1979	George Mills*	Contract Personnel	Born 1912 Palisade, Colorado	Died 1980 Phoenix, AZ		
1979	Wick Peth*	Contract Personnel	April 15, 1930 Mount Vernon, WA	December 27, 2019 (aged 89) Sedro Woolley, WA		
1979	Jimmy Schumacher*	Contract Personnel	June 21, 1920 Prescott, AZ	January 24, 2010 (aged 89) Las Vegas, NV		
2004	Dave Smith	Media	Born 1948 Mansfield, OH			
2026	Bobby Goodspeed	Notable / Lifetime Achievement	October 21, 1938 (age 88) Okeman, OK			
2026	Jeff Medders	Notable/Lifetime Achievement	March 12, 1963 (age 63) Hartshorne, OK			
2025	Tom Miller	Notable/Lifetime Achievement	December 27, 1948 (age 77) Rapid City, SD			
2025	Pam Minick	Notable/Lifetime Achievement	June 30, 1953 (age 73) Las Vegas, NV			
2024	J.D. Yates	Notable/Lifetime Achievement	August 15, 1960 (age 66) Colorado Springs, CO			
2023	Butch Knowles	Notable/Lifetime Achievement	May 11, 1955 Klamath Falls, OR			
2023	Tom Feller	Notable/Lifetime Achievement	September 10, 1948 Waco, TX			
2023	Fay Ann Horton Leach	Notable/Lifetime Achievement	February 2, 1936 Kilgore, TX	January 2, 2025 (aged 88)		
2022	Mel Potter*	Notable/Lifetime Achievement	January 2, 1935 Wisconsin Rapids, Wisconsin	February 22, 2025 (aged 90) Marana, Arizona		
2022	Cindy Rosser	Notable/Lifetime Achievement	December 7, 1954 Yuba City, California			
2020	Randy Witte	Notable/Lifetime Achievement	January 28, 1948, Denver, Colorado			
2019	Jerome Robinson*	Notable/Lifetime Achievement	October 16, 1947 (age 79) Ogallala, NE	January 9, 2022 (aged 74) Fort Collins, CO		
2019	Florence Youree	Notable/Lifetime Achievement	May 13, 1928 (age 98) Duncan, OK			
2018	Walt Garrison*	Notable/Lifetime Achievement	July 23, 1944 Denton, TX	October 11, 2023 (aged 79) Weatherford, TX		
2017	Bob Ragsdale	Notable/Lifetime Achievement	October 23, 1936 (age 90) Harlem, MT			
2016	Myrtis Dightman	Notable/Lifetime Achievement	May 7, 1935 (age 91) Crockett, TX			
2015	Jack Hannum*	Notable/Lifetime Achievement	October 24, 1943 Ogden, UT	September 16, 2014 (aged 70) Ogden, UT		
2012	Hal "Hal" Littrell	Notable/Lifetime Achievement	March 31, 1931 (age 95) Lubbock, TX			
2011	Keith Martin	Notable/Lifetime Achievement	August 26, 1947 (age 79) San Antonio, TX			
2010	Denny Flynn	Notable/Lifetime Achievement	April 21, 1951 (age 75) Paris, AR			
2009	Ace Berry	Notable/Lifetime Achievement	January 13, 1947 (age 79) Bartlesville, OK			
2008	Duane Howard*	Notable/Lifetime Achievement	August 2, 1933 Devils Lake, ND	October 1, 2015 (aged 82) Sheyenne, ND		
2008	Buddy Lytle*	Notable/Lifetime Achievement	September 13, 1940 Sterling, OK	April 10, 2002 (aged 61) Byhalia, MS		
2007	Michael Gaughan	Notable/Lifetime Achievement	March 24, 1943 (age 83) Omaha, NE			
2007	Doug Corey, DVM	Notable/Lifetime Achievement	March 4, 1950 (age 76) Pendleton, OR			
2006	John & Mildred Farris*	Notable/Lifetime Achievement	John born 1928 Addington, OK	Mildred born August 8, 1933, Andrews, TX	Mildred died May 13, 2013, Addington, OK	
2005	Chris LeDoux*	Notable/Lifetime Achievement	October 2, 1948 Biloxi, MS	March 9, 2005 (aged 56) Casper, WY		
2004	Dr. J. Pat Evans*	Notable/Lifetime Achievement	August 5, 1930 Dallas, TX	July 22, 2019 (aged 88) Dallas, TX	Dallas, TX	
2001	Myron "Doc" Etienne*	Notable/Lifetime Achievement	May 19, 1924 Pasadena, CA	September 10, 2016 (aged 92) Carmel, CA		
2000	Cecil Jones*	Notable/Lifetime Achievement	July 2, 1917 Menan, ID	August 14, 2014 (aged 97) Placerville, CA		
1999	Bob Thain	Notable/Lifetime Achievement	May 27, 1936 (age 90) Portland, OR			
1999	Charles "Lefty" Wilken*	Notable/Lifetime Achievement	March 19, 1920 Valentine, TX	February 14, 2007 (aged 86) Las Cruces, NM		
1998	John Lustin, Jr.*	Notable/Lifetime Achievement	January 17, 1917 Nacona, TX	February 26, 2001 (aged 84) Fort Worth, TX		
1998	Sonny Linger*	Notable/Lifetime Achievement	April 9, 1928 Alamosa, CO	April 23, 2013 (aged 85) Miles City, MT		
1997	Eldon Evans*	Notable/Lifetime Achievement	April 26, 1930 Pocatello, ID	March 26, 2014 (aged 83) Boise, ID		
1997	Bill Hervey*	Notable/Lifetime Achievement	November 7, 1924 Greenville, TX	March 6, 2018 (aged 93) Greensboro, NC		
1996	John Burke*	Notable/Lifetime Achievement	February 27, 1918 Long Beach, CA	August 22, 1996 (aged 78) Casper, WY		
1991	Buster Ivory*	Notable/Lifetime Achievement	August 9, 1923 Alturus, CA	March 10, 2003 (aged 79) Pampa, TX		
1991	W. R. Watt, Sr.*	Notable/Lifetime Achievement	Born 1900 Longview, TX	Died 1977 Fort Worth, TX		
1990	Clem McSpadden*	Notable/Lifetime Achievement	November 9, 1925 Busyhead, OK	July 7, 2008 (aged 82) Houston, TX		
1988	Malcolm Baldrige*	Notable/Lifetime Achievement	October 4, 1922 Omaha, NE	July 25, 1987 (aged 64) Brentwood, CA		
1988	Benny Binion*	Notable/Lifetime Achievement	November 20, 1901 Grayson County, TX	December 25, 1989 (aged 88) Las Vegas, NV		
1985	Lex Connelly*	Notable/Lifetime Achievement	March 5, 1926 Bryn Mawr, PA	April 5, 1984 (aged 58) Baker, OR		
1983	Bob Crosby*	Notable/Lifetime Achievement	February 27, 1897 Midland, TX	October 20, 1947 (aged 50) Roswell, NM	Roswell, NM	
1979	Josie Bennett*	Notable/Lifetime Achievement	July 10, 1903 Enden, AZ	October 4, 1985 (aged 82) Colorado Springs, CO		
1979	Harry Knight*	Notable/Lifetime Achievement	September 19, 1907 Quebec City, Montreal, CN	April 5, 1989 (aged 81) Fowler, CO		
1979	Tad Lucas*	Notable/Lifetime Achievement	September 1, 1902 Cody, NE	February 23, 1990 (aged 87) Fort Worth, TX		
1979	Dave Stout*	Notable/Lifetime Achievement	June 18, 1908 Kansas City, MO	October 1, 1990 (aged 82) Wickenburg, AZ		
1979	Cy Taillon*	Notable/Lifetime Achievement	October 18, 1907 Cavalier, ND	April 16, 1980 (aged 72) Great Falls, MT		
2026	San Angelo Stock Show & Rodeo	Rodeo Committee	Founded 1932			
2025	Livermore Rodeo	Rodeo Committee	Founded April 1919			
2024	Tri-State Rodeo	Rodeo Committee	Founded September 1948			
2023	St. Paul Rodeo	Rodeo Committee	Founded 1936			
2023	Cowtown Rodeo	Rodeo Committee	Founded 1929			
2022	Nebraska's Big Rodeo	Rodeo Committee	Founded September 1921			
2020	Ellensburg Rodeo	Rodeo Committee	Founded 1923			
2019	Cody Stampede Rodeo	Rodeo Committee	Founded 1919			
2018	Black Hills Roundup	Rodeo Committee	Founded 1918			
2017	Ogden Pioneer Days	Rodeo Committee	Founded 1934			
2016	Redding Rodeo	Rodeo Committee	Founded September 1943			
2016	Spanish Fork Fiesta Days Rodeo	Rodeo Committee	Founded 1942			
2015	Guymon Pioneer Days Rodeo	Rodeo Committee	Founded May 1, 1933			
2015	Iowa's Championship Rodeo	Rodeo Committee	Founded 1923			
2015	Red Bluff Round-Up	Rodeo Committee	Founded fall of 1921			
2014	Clovis Rodeo	Rodeo Committee	Founded spring of 1914			
2014	Greeley Stampede	Rodeo Committee	Founded 1922			
2014	Rowell Ranch Pro Rodeo	Rodeo Committee	Founded 1921			
2014	Snake River Stampede	Rodeo Committee	Founded 1913			
2012	Dodge City Roundup	Rodeo Committee	Founded 1977			
2011	Deadwood Days of '76	Rodeo Committee	Founded 1998			
2008	Buffalo Bill Rodeo	Rodeo Committee	Founded July 4, 1882			
2008	Calgary Stampede	Rodeo Committee	Founded September 1912			
2008	California Rodeo Salinas	Rodeo Committee	Founded August 1, 1911			
2008	Cheyenne Frontier Days	Rodeo Committee	Founded September 1897			
2008	National Circuit Finals Rodeo	Rodeo Committee	Founded 1987			
2008	La Fiesta de los Vaqueros	Rodeo Committee	Founded February 21–23, 1925			
2008	Grand National Rodeo, Horse & Stock Show	Rodeo Committee	Founded November 1941			
2008	Houston Livestock Show & Rodeo	Rodeo Committee	Founded April 1932			
2008	National Western Stock Show & Rodeo	Rodeo Committee	Founded January 1932			
2008	Pendleton Round-Up	Rodeo Committee	Founded September 1910			
2008	Pikes Peak or Bust Rodeo	Rodeo Committee	Founded July 1937			
2008	Prescott Frontier Days® World's Oldest Rodeo®	Rodeo Committee	Founded July 4, 1888			
2008	Reno Rodeo	Rodeo Committee	Founded 1919			
2008	San Antonio Stock Show & Rodeo	Rodeo Committee	Founded February 1950			
2008	Southwestern Exposition and Livestock Show	Rodeo Committee	Founded 1896			
2008	West of the Pecos Rodeo	Rodeo Committee	Founded July 4, 1883			
2025	Mack Altizer	Rodeo Producer	October 27, 1957 (age 69) Del Rio, Texas			
2023	Cody Wright	Saddle Bronc Riding	April 1, 1977 Toquerville, UT			
2017	Enoch Walker*	Saddle Bronc Riding	January 28, 1932 Camp Verde, AZ	August 30, 1979 (aged 47) Boise, ID		
2014	Glen O'Neill	Saddle Bronc Riding	January 9, 1973 (age 53) Kempsey, NSW, AUS			
2013	Kenny McLean*	Saddle Bronc Riding	May 17, 1939 Penticton, BC, CAN	July 13, 2002 (aged 63) Taber, AB, CAN		
2012	Billy Etbauer	Saddle Bronc Riding	January 15, 1963 (age 63) Huron, SD			
2012	Robert Etbauer	Saddle Bronc Riding	July 10, 1961 (age 65) Huron, SD			
2011	Burel Mulkey*	Saddle Bronc Riding	May 25, 1904 Clyde, ID	November 20, 1982 (aged 78) Lake Isabella, CA		
2010	John McBeth	Saddle Bronc Riding	October 2, 1940 (age 86) Kingman, KS			
2009	Dan Mortensen	Saddle Bronc Riding	December 16, 1968 (age 57) Billings, MT			
2008	Tom Reeves	Saddle Bronc Riding	September 15, 1964 (age 62)			
2007	Bud Munroe*	Saddle Bronc Riding	January 12, 1952 Lewistown, MT	April 9, 2022 (aged 70) Waco, TX		
2005	Joe Marvel	Saddle Bronc Riding	June 26, 1955 (age 71) Battle Mountain, NV			
2004	Alvin Nelson*	Saddle Bronc Riding	April 5, 1934	December 23, 2014 (aged 80) Rochester, MN		
2003	Dennis Reiners	Saddle Bronc Riding	October 17, 1937 (age 89) Clara City, MN			
2001	Guy Weeks*	Saddle Bronc Riding	January 3, 1932 Fort Worth, Texas	September 14, 2007 (aged 75) Abilene, TX		
1999	Mel Hyland	Saddle Bronc Riding	September 16, 1948 (age 78) Edmonton, AB, CN			
1995	Brad Gjermundson	Saddle Bronc Riding	March 25, 1959 (age 67) Richardson, ND			
1994	Monty Henson	Saddle Bronc Riding	October 22, 1953 (age 73) Farmersville, TX			
1992	Deb Copenhaver*	Saddle Bronc Riding	January 21, 1925 Wilbur, WA	February 7, 2019 (aged 94) Creston, WA		
1992	Clint Johnson	Saddle Bronc Riding	April 28, 1956 (age 70) Spearfish, SD			
1991	Marty Wood*	Saddle Bronc Riding	June 4, 1933 Bowness, Alberta	August 10, 2019 (aged 86) Pendleton, OR	Pendleton, OR	
1990	Bobby Berger	Saddle Bronc Riding	June 22, 1945 (age 81) Halstead, KS			
1989	Winston Bruce*	Saddle Bronc Riding	October 27, 1937 Stettier, AB, CN	July 10, 2017 (aged 79) Calgary, AB, CN		
1979	Shawn Davis	Saddle Bronc Riding	December 7, 1940 (age 85) Butte, MT			
1979	Sharkey Irwin*	Saddle Bronc Riding	August 4, 1899 Clark, CO	Death 1984 Buena Vista, CO		
1979	Pete Knight*	Saddle Bronc Riding	May 5, 1903 Philadelphia, PA	May 23, 1937 (aged 34) Hayward, CA		
1979	Gene Pruett*	Saddle Bronc Riding	February 1, 1917 Moscow, ID	Death 1987 Lakewood, CO		
1979	Bill Smith	Saddle Bronc Riding	July 28, 1941 (age 85) Red Lodge, MT		Cody, WY	
1979	Mike Stuart*	Saddle Bronc Riding	March 10, 1901 Pauls Valley, OK	November 27, 1984 (aged 83)		
1979	Earl Thode*	Saddle Bronc Riding	December 7, 1900 Belvidere, ST	May 18, 1964 (aged 63) Vernon, AZ		
2016	Arnold Felts	Steer Roping	May 21, 1947 (age 79) Paducah, TX			
2009	Walt Arnold	Steer Roping	September 1, 1938 (age 88) Silverton, TX			
2008	Shaun Burchett*	Steer Roping	November 9, 1963 Pryor, OK	January 26, 1992 (aged 28) Sherman, TX		
2007	Jim Davis	Steer Roping	June 3, 1956 (age 70) Ponca City, OK			
1996	Guy Allen	Steer Roping	September 5, 1958 (age 68) Coushatta, LA			
1979	Jim Bob Altizer*	Steer Roping	May 5, 1932 Del Rio, TX	December 12, 1997 (aged 65) Del Rio, TX		
1979	Sonny Davis*	Steer Roping	January 2, 1935 Kenna, NM	April 4, 1991 (aged 56) Kenna, NM		
1979	Clark McEntire*	Steer Roping	November 30, 1927 Graham, OK	October 23, 2014 (aged 86) Coalgate, OK		
1979	Ike Rude*	Steer Roping	March 26, 1894 Mangum, OK	January 3, 1985 (aged 90) Mangum, OK		
1979	Everett Shaw*	Steer Roping	June 7, 1908 Hog Shooter Creek, OK	November 10, 1979 (aged 71) Stonewell, OK		
1979	Shoat Webster*	Steer Roping	January 23, 1925 Lenapah, OK	May 20, 2013 (aged 88) Bartlesville, OK		
1979	Olin Young*	Steer Roping	September 11, 1936 Lovington, NM	February 23, 2023 (aged 86)		
2026	Butch Meyers*	Steer Wrestling	November 13, 1945 Denver, CO	July 24, 2024 (aged 78) Athens, TX		
2023	Luke Branquinho	Steer Wrestling	September 17, 1980 (age 46)		Los Alamos, CA	
2019	Dean Gorsuch	Steer Wrestling	August 31, 1979 (age 47) Mullen, NE			
2017	Tommy Puryear	Steer Wrestling	January 20, 1950 (age 76) San Antonio, TX			
2015	Harry Charters*	Steer Wrestling	April 16, 1925 Nampa, ID	June 7, 1981 (aged 56) Boise, ID		
2014	Byron Walker	Steer Wrestling	January 19, 1958 (age 68) Lawton, OK			
2006	Bob A. Robinson*	Steer Wrestling	May 13, 1933 Rockhand, ID	December 16, 2017 (aged 84) Twin Falls, ID		
2003	Steve Duhon	Steer Wrestling	May 27, 1962 (age 64) Opelousas, LA			
2001	C.R. Boucher	Steer Wrestling	May 21, 1931 (age 95) Livingston, MT			
1998	Ote Berry	Steer Wrestling	September 9, 1962 (age 64) Rapid City, SD			
1996	John W. Jones, Jr.	Steer Wrestling	August 13, 1960 (age 66) Santa Maria, CA			
1994	Gene Ross*-5	Steer Wrestling	January 23, 1904 Sayre, OK	February 16, 1988 (aged 84) Clute, TX		
1989	Bill Pickett*	Steer Wrestling	December 5, 1870 Austin, TX	April 2, 1932 (aged 61) near Ponca, OK		
1979	Hugh Bennett*	Steer Wrestling	September 19, 1905 Knox City, TX	July 15, 1994 (aged 88) Colorado Springs, CO		
1979	James Bynum*	Steer Wrestling	September 15, 1924 Danville, AL	May 28, 1999 (aged 74) Maypearl, TX		
1979	Roy Duvall	Steer Wrestling	August 23, 1942 (age 84) Boynton, OK			
1979	John W. Jones, Sr.*	Steer Wrestling	June 26, 1932 Fresno, CA	October 6, 2013 (aged 81) Morro Bay, CA		
1979	Harley May*	Steer Wrestling	June 2, 1926 Deming, NM	October 28, 2008 (aged 82) Santa Ana, CA		
1979	Homer Pettigrew*	Steer Wrestling	December 25, 1915 Grady, NM	July 12, 1997 (aged 81) Grady, NM		
1979	Jack Roddy*	Steer Wrestling	October 3, 1937 San Francisco, CA	March 2, 2025 (aged 87) Stephenville, TX		
2026	Ike Sankey	Stock Contractors	May 15, 1957 (age 69) Grand Junction, CO			
2025	Harley Tucker*	Stock Contractors	January 24, 1908 Joseph, OR	April 2, 1960 (aged 52) Vancouver, WA		
2024	Sammy Andrews	Stock Contractors	February 8, 1947 (age 79) Texas			
2022	Jake Beutler*	Stock Contractors	February 15, 1903 Okarche, Oklahoma	March 23, 1975 (aged 72) Tucson, Arizona		
2019	Elra and Jiggs Beutler*	Stock Contractors	Elra October 19, 1896 Okarche, OK; Jiggs December 23, 1924 Elk City, OK	Elra June 3, 1987 (aged 59) Elk City, OK; Jiggs January 21, 1980 (aged 55) Elk City, OK	Oklahoma	
2018	Billy Minick	Stock Contractors	January 10, 1939 (age 87) Fort Worth, TX			
2013	Rex "Bud" Kerby*	Stock Contractors	June 10, 1940 Moab, UT	October 10, 2010 (aged 82) Salt Lake City, UT		
2010	Bennie Beutler	Stock Contractors	April 24, 1949 (age 77) Elk City, OK			
2009	Erv Korkow*	Stock Contractors	November 24, 1914 Wishek, ND	November 25, 1993 (aged 79) Pierre, SD		
2020	Jim Sutton	Stock Contractors	April 20, 1935, Onida, South Dakota			
2008	Feek Tooke*	Stock Contractors	April 12, 1909 Refield, SD	December 7, 1968 (aged 59) Oklahoma City, OK		
2006	J.C. "Doc" Sorenson*	Stock Contractors	December 20, 1893 Weber, UT	May 11, 1984 (aged 90) Idaho Falls, ID		
2005	Marvin Brookman*	Stock Contractors	September 10, 1913 Poplar, MT	January 23, 2006 (aged 92) Wolf Point, MT		
2003	Mike Cervi*	Stock Contractors	September 9, 1936 Denver, CO	March 19, 2025 (aged 88) Sterling, CO		
2000	Joe Kelsey*	Stock Contractors	April 16, 1910 Butte, MT	February 10, 1986 (aged 75) Tonasket, WA		
1997	Swanny Kerby*	Stock Contractors	January 23, 1917 Moab, UT	December 15, 2005 (aged 88) Mt. Pleasant, UT		
1996	Tommy Steiner*	Stock Contractors	1926, Austin, TX	September 20, 1999 Austin, TX		
1995	Cotton Rosser*	Stock Contractors	August 5, 1928 (age 98) Long Beach, CA	June 22, 2022 Maryville, CA		
1994	Bob Barnes*	Stock Contractors	April 19, 1929 Cherokee, IA	November 23, 2013 (aged 84) Peterson, IA		
1994	Harry Vold*	Stock Contractors	January 29, 1924 Edmonton, AB, CA	March 13, 2017 (aged 93) Avondale, CO		
1993	Neal Gay*	Stock Contractors	June 25, 1926 Dallas, TX	August 11, 2022 (aged 96) Terrell, TX		
1992	Reg Kesler*	Stock Contractors	October 16, 1919 Lethbridge, AB, CA	May 16, 2001 (aged 81) Sterling, AB, CA		
1990	Walt Alsbaugh*	Stock Contractors	November 15, 1918 Boulder, CO	September 24, 1992 (aged 73) Alamosa, CO		
1990	Verne Elliott*	Stock Contractors	July 4, 1890 Platteville, CO	June 22, 1962 (aged 71) Denver, CO		
1989	Henry & Bobby Christensen*	Stock Contractors	Henry October 15, 1911 Lake Creek, OR; April 10, 1986 (aged 74) Eugene, OR	Robert June 18, 1913 Eugene, OR; March 30, 2007 (aged 93) Eugene, OR		
1982	James H. Sutton*	Stock Contractors	December 5, 1899 Sully County, SD	February 1, 1991 (aged 91) Rapid City, SD		
1979	Gene Autry*	Stock Contractors	September 29, 1907 Tioga, TX	October 2, 1998 (aged 91) Studio City, CA		
1979	Lynn Beutler*	Stock Contractors	January 17, 1905 Elk City, OK	April 29, 1999 (aged 70) Elk City, OK		
1979	Everett Colburn*	Stock Contractors	July 26, 1892 DeLamar, ID	March 20, 1972 (aged 79) Dublin, TX		
1979	Leo J. Cremer*	Stock Contractors	1891, Cashton, WI	November 28, 1953 Big Timber, MT		
1979	C.B. Irwin*	Stock Contractors	August 16, 1877 Chillocothe, MO	1934, Cheynne, WY		
1979	Andy Jauregui*	Stock Contractors	February 10, 1903 Ventura County, CA	July 14, 1990 (aged 87) Newhall, CA		
1979	Harry Rowell*	Stock Contractors	November 11, 1891 Peterborough, England	August 23, 1969 (aged 77) Hayward, CA		
2025	Steve Purcella	Team Roping	November 12, 1966 (age 60) Roswell, NM			
2024	Art Arnold	Team Roping	March 20, 1940 (age 86) Phoenix, AZ			
2023	Doyle Gellerman	Team Roping	December 4, 1952 Alameda, CA			
2019	Allen Bach	Team Roping	April 30, 1957 (age 69) Soap Lake, WA		Arizona	
2018	Rich Skelton	Team Roping	June 18, 1966 (age 60) Electra, TX			
2018	Speed Williams	Team Roping	December 14, 1967 (age 58) Jacksonville, FL			
2017	Mike Beers	Team Roping	May 4, 1958 (age 68) Rufus, OR			
2016	Jerold Camarillo	Team Roping	April 1, 1947 (age 79) Santa Ana, CA			
2008	Bobby Hurley	Team Roping	June 24, 1964 (age 62) Clarksville, AR			
2007	Joe Glenn*	Team Roping	November 23, 1914 Douglas, AZ	November 29, 1984 (aged 70) Douglas, AZ		
2005	Charles Maggini*	Team Roping	August 9, 1894 San Benito, CA	April 9, 1982 (aged 87) San Jose, CA		
2004	Tee Woolman	Team Roping	December 4, 1956 (age 69) Vinita, OK			
2004	Asbury Schell*	Team Roping	July 22, 1903 Gisela, AZ	September 24, 1980 (aged 77) Cottonwood, AZ		
2001	Les Hirdes*	Team Roping	September 21, 1923 Tipton, CA	June 19, 1999 (aged 75) Turlock, CA		
1997	Jake Barnes	Team Roping	April 4, 1959 (age 67) Huntsville, TX			
1997	Clay O'Brien Cooper	Team Roping	May 6, 1961 (age 65) Ray, AZ			
1979	Leo Camarillo	Team Roping	January 25, 1946 Santa Ana, CA	December 30, 2020 (aged 74) Chandler, AZ		
1979	Ben Johnson*	Team Roping	June 13, 1918 Foraker, OK	April 8, 1996 (aged 77) Mesa, AZ		
1979	John Miller	Team Roping	October 16, 1942 (age 84) McAllen, TX			
1979	Jim Rodriguez, Jr.	Team Roping	September 9, 1941 (age 85) Watsonville, CA			
1979	Dale Smith*	Team Roping	February 6, 1928 Safford, AZ	January 15, 2017 (aged 88) Stanfield, AZ		
2025	Stran Smith	Tie-down roping	July 14, 1973 (age 53) Childress, TX			
2020	Cody Ohl	Tie-down Roping	September 21, 1973 Rosenburg, Texas			
2004	Fred Whitfield	Tie-down Roping	August 5, 1967 (age 59) Houston, TX			
2002	Jake McClure*	Tie-down Roping	November 26, 1903 Amarillo, TX	July 19, 1940 (aged 36) Lovington, NM		
1994	Barry Burk	Tie-down Roping	January 11, 1942 (age 84) Duncan, OK			
1979	Clyde Burk*	Tie-down Roping	June 13, 1913 Comanche, OK	January 22, 1945 (aged 31) Denver, CO		
1979	Roy Cooper*	Tie-down Roping	November 13, 1955 Hobbs, NM	April 29, 2025 (aged 69) Decatur, TX		
1979	Troy Fort*	Tie-down Roping	December 8, 1917 Lovington, NM	January 2, 1993 (aged 75) Lovington, NM		
1979	Glen Franklin	Tie-down Roping	March 18, 1936 House, NM	January 3, 2026 (aged 89) House, NM		
1979	Toots Mansfield*	Tie-down Roping	May 15, 1914 Bandera, TX	December 6, 1998 (aged 84) Big Spring, TX		
1979	Don McLaughlin*	Tie-down Roping	October 27, 1927 Chester, PA	July 20, 1994 (aged 66) Fort Collins, CO		
1979	Dean Oliver	Tie-down Roping	November 17, 1929 (age 97) Dodge City, KS			

*Deceased

=== Livestock ===
Livestock ProRodeo Hall of Fame inductees
Year	Name	Category	Species	Breed	Ref(s)
2026	Killer Bee*	Bareback Broncs/ Saddle Broncs	Equine		
2023	Night Jacket*	Bareback Broncs	Equine		
2020	Grated Coconut*	Bareback Broncs/ Saddle Broncs	Equine		
2019	Commotion*	Bareback Broncs	Equine		
2017	Smith & Velvet*	Bareback Broncs	Equine		
2012	Khadafy Skoal*	Bareback Broncs	Equine		
2004	Three Bars*	Bareback Broncs	Equine		
2000	Skoal's Sippin' Velvet*	Bareback Broncs	Equine		
1993	High Tide*	Bareback Broncs	Equine		
1979	Come Apart*	Bareback Broncs	Equine		
2022	Medicine Woman*	Saddle Broncs	Equine		
2014	Spring Fling*	Saddle Broncs	Equine		
2011	War Paint*	Saddle Broncs	Equine	Paint-Pinto cross	
2008	Trails End*	Saddle Broncs	Equine		
1998	Miss Klamath*	Saddle Broncs	Equine		
1979	Descent*	Saddle Broncs	Equine		
1979	Hell's Angel*	Saddle Broncs	Equine		
1979	Five Minutes to Midnight*	Saddle Broncs	Equine		
1979	Midnight*	Saddle Broncs	Equine	Thoroughbred-Percheron cross	
1979	Steamboat*	Saddle Broncs	Equine		
1979	Tipperary*	Saddle Broncs	Equine		
2024	Mr. T*	Bulls	Bovine		
2007	Skoal Pacific Bell*	Bulls	Bovine	Brangus	
1999	Bodacious*	Bulls	Bovine	Charbray	
1990	Crooked Nose* (fighting bull)	Bulls	Bovine		
1990	Red Rock*	Bulls	Bovine	Braford	
1979	Old Spec*	Bulls	Bovine	Brahma	
1979	Oscar*	Bulls	Bovine	Brahma	
1979	Tornado*	Bulls	Bovine	Braford	
2025	Little Willy*	Timed-event horses	Equine		
2022	Mighty Eye* "Whiskey"	Timed-event horses	Equine	Quarter Horse	
2018	French Flash Hawk* "Bozo"	Timed-event horses	Equine	Quarter Horse	
2017	Star Plaudit* "Red"	Timed-event horses	Equine	Quarter Horse	
2016	Scottie*	Timed-event horses	Equine		
2015	Precious Speck* "Walt"	Timed-event horses	Equine		
1996	Gils Bay Boy* "Scamper"	Timed-event horses	Equine	Quarter Horse	
1979	Baby Doll Combs*	Timed-event horses	Equine	Quarter Horse	
1979	Baldy*	Timed-event horses	Equine		
1979	Bullet*	Timed-event horses	Equine		
1979	Make It Do* "Peanuts"	Timed-event horses	Equine	Quarter Horse	
1979	Poker Chip Peake*	Timed-event horses	Equine		
2016	Gray Wolf*	Notable Livestock	Equine		

*Deceased

== Legends of ProRodeo ==
In 2006, the hall started honoring cowboys who participate in the rodeo community long after their rodeo career is over, spending their time and energy. The individual is honored in person at the ProRodeo Hall of Fame's annual Wrangler Gold Buckle Gala in Las Vegas, Nevada.

- 2006 Jake Barnes
- 2007 Jim Shoulders
- 2008 Clem McSpadden
- 2009 Harry Vold
- 2010 Larry Mahan
- 2011 Shawn Davis
- 2012 Dean Oliver
- 2013 Don Gay
- 2014 Benny Binion
- 2015 Mel Potter
- 2016 Neal Gay
- 2017 Michael Gaughan
- 2018 Keith Martin
- 2019 Cotton Rosser
- 2020 Bob Tallman
- 2021 Clint Johnson
- 2022 Mike Cervi
- 2023 Red Steagall
- 2024 Pete Coors
- 2025 Billy and Pam Minick
- 2026 Joe Beaver

== Ken Stemler Pioneer Award ==
Since 2014, the PRCA has awarded the Ken Stemler Pioneer Award, which recognizes those who have provided innovative ideas and forward thinking that help the development, advancement and success of the PRCA and/or the Hall of Fame and their missions. It is given to recognize those whose significant contributions through their service, dedication and positive influence, have enhanced the scope, reach or future success of both organizations. Ken Stemler was the recipient of the inaugural Pioneer Award in 2014, given to him posthumously, and it was named after him starting in 2015. This award is given out annually at the Cowboy Ball in August.

- 2014 Ken Stemler
- 2015 Brenda Michael
- 2016 Earl and Weldon Bascom
- 2017 Western Horseman Magazine
- 2018 Kay Bleakly
- 2019 Guy Elliot
- 2022 John Van Cronkhite
- 2023 Bryan McDonald
- 2024 Bob Feist
- 2025 Red Steagall
- 2026 Troy Weekley

== See also ==
- Lists of rodeo performers
- Bull Riding Hall of Fame
- Professional Bull Riders
- Professional Rodeo Cowboys Association
- ProRodeo Hall of Fame
- American Bucking Bull
- International Professional Rodeo Association
- Bull Riders Only
- Championship Bull Riding
