= Professional Bull Riders: Heroes and Legends =

Rodeo hall of fame

The Professional Bull Riders Heroes and Legends celebration honors five divisions in the Professional Bull Riders (PBR) and Professional Rodeo Cowboys Association (PRCA), including the best bucking bulls.

== History ==
From 1996 through 2007, the PBR awarded the Ring of Honor in the arena during the World Finals in Las Vegas, Nevada. There was no Ring of Honor ceremony in 2008.

In 2009 and 2010, the Ring of Honor ceremony was held at the Pueblo Convention Center in conjunction with Pueblo, Colorado's Wild, Wild West Fest in May, which included a regular-season PBR Built Ford Tough Series event in said city. The Sharon Shoulders Award was first awarded in 2010, then came the Jim Shoulders Lifetime Achievement Award and Brand of Honor in 2011, and the Ty Murray Top Hand Award in 2018.

The PBR Heroes and Legends celebration debuted in 2011 and was held at the South Point Hotel in Las Vegas the day before the first round of every annual PBR World Finals. There was no Heroes and Legends celebration in 2020 because of COVID-19 restrictions, but the ceremony returned in 2021.

The PBR World Finals moved to the Dallas–Fort Worth metroplex in 2022 and now take place in the spring after previously taking place in the autumn.

There was not a Heroes and Legends ceremony in 2022. However, it was announced in September of that year that the new PBR Hall of Fame would be unveiled at the National Cowboy & Western Heritage Museum in Oklahoma City, Oklahoma, within the museum's American Rodeo Gallery. In 2023, the PBR Hall of Fame was opened to the public. That same year, the Heroes and Legends celebration was moved to the National Cowboy & Western Heritage Museum.

Since 2024, the Heroes and Legends celebration is held every July.

== Ring of Honor ==
The PBR Ring of Honor is the equivalent of a Hall of Fame for bull riders. The PBR created this award in 1996 to recognize those who have had a "significant and lasting contribution to the sport of professional bull riding". Honorees may be PBR bull riders, but some PRCA bull riders have also been honored, for example, icon Lane Frost. "It is both a physical ring and a fellowship of men." This honor is bestowed upon "select bull riders whose contributions to the sport of bull riding last beyond their success in the competitive arena". The award is "symbolized by a custom-made, gold-and-diamond ring engraved with the honoree's name and the PBR logo". Recipients are honored with this award during a ceremony at the PBR World Finals near the end of the year.

It was created in 1996 with the inaugural induction of ProRodeo Hall of Fame members Jim Shoulders and Ted Nuce.

The PRCA, which sanctions traditional rodeo, has the ProRodeo Hall of Fame. The Bull Riding Hall of Fame located in Fort Worth, Texas, is not associated with the PBR.

=== Recipients ===
1996

- Cody Lambert
- Ted Nuce
- Jim Shoulders
- Harry Tompkins

1997

- Donnie Gay

1998

- Jerome Davis
- Larry Mahan

1999

- Lane Frost
- Tuff Hedeman
- Jerome Robinson

2000

- Clint Branger

2001

- Wacey Cathey

2002

- Denny Flynn
- Daryl Mills
- Ty Murray

2003

- Cody Custer
- Myrtis Dightman
- Aaron Semas

2004

- David Fournier
- Charlie Sampson

2005

- Troy Dunn
- Michael Gaffney
- Bobby Steiner

2006

- Bobby DelVecchio
- Cody Snyder

2007

- Phil Lyne
- Carl Nafzger

2009

- J.W. Hart
- Justin McBride
- Adriano Morães

2010

- Randy Bernard
- Jim Sharp

2011

- Tater Porter
- Brent Thurman

2012

- Ross Coleman
- Mike White

2013

- Bubba Dunn
- Chris Shivers

2014

- Bobby Berger
- Adam Carrillo
- Gilbert Carrillo

2015

- Luke Snyder

2016

- Owen Washburn

2017

- Ricky Bolin
- Lyle Sankey

2018

- Gary Leffew

2019

- Guilherme Marchi

2021

- Robson Palermo

2023

- Kody Lostroh

2024

- Paulo Crimber

2025

- Freckles Brown
- J.B. Mauney

2026

- Silvano Alves
- George Paul

== Sharon Shoulders Award ==
This award recognizes women who have supported professional bull riding; "those whose work, partnership and faith have been as integral to the sport as the athletes themselves." These are women who have shared the burdens of a bull rider in his life and in the sport and helped enable him to contribute to the sport. It is named for the wife of Jim Shoulders. The PBR created this award in 2010 and honored inaugural inductee Tiffany Davis.

=== Recipients ===
- 2010 - Tiffany Davis (wife of Jerome Davis)
- 2011 - Leanne Lambert (wife of Cody Lambert)
- 2012 - Jackie Dunn (wife of Troy Dunn)
- 2013 - Flavia Morães (wife of Adriano Morães)
- 2014 - Stacey Custer (wife of Cody Custer)
- 2015 - Robyn Gaffney (wife of Michael Gaffney)
- 2016 - LeAnn Hart (wife of J.W. Hart)
- 2017 - Julie Carrillo (wife of Gilbert Carrillo)
- 2018 - Jill McBride (wife of Justin McBride)
- 2019 - Kylie Shivers (wife of Chris Shivers)
- 2021 - Terri Gay (wife of Donnie Gay)
- 2023 - María Crimber (wife of Paulo Crimber)
- 2024 - Tiffany Owens (wife of Donald Owens)
- 2025 - Priscila Palermo (wife of Robson Palermo)
- 2026 - Elsie Frost (mother of Lane Frost)

== Jim Shoulders Lifetime Achievement Award ==
This award is named after Jim Shoulders, who won 16 world titles and is recognized in his field as possibly the greatest western-sports athlete of all time. This award recognizes some of the many non-bull riders who have made a tangible contribution to the sport and whose efforts have built the PBR, including stock contractors, contract personnel, PBR employees, and more. It was first awarded in 2011. The inaugural recipient was ProRodeo Hall of Fame inductee bullfighter Rob Smets.

=== Recipients ===
2011

- Rob Smets

2012

- Tom Teague

2013

- Cotton Rosser

2014

- David Allen

2015

- Brett Hoffman

2016

- Dr. Tandy Freeman

2017

- Doug Scott
- Bill Selman

2018

- Joe Baumgartner
- Dr. J. Pat Evans
- Barry Frank

2019

- Mack Altizer
- Neal Gay

2021

- Michael Gaughan
- Sean Gleason

2023

- Bob Funk, Sr.

2024

- Frank Newsom

2025

- Pam Minick

2026

- Flint Rasmussen

== Brand of Honor ==
First awarded in 2011 to Little Yellow Jacket, the Brand of Honor is awarded to a bull for superlative performance in the PBR. The PBR recognizes that "there are two great athletes in every ride". Brand of Honor bulls are elite athletes who have gone above and beyond in the sport. In 2016, Bushwacker was awarded the Brand of Honor. This three-time World Champion bucking bull is universally considered to be the best in bull riding history.

=== Recipients ===
- 2011 - Little Yellow Jacket
- 2012 - Dillinger
- 2013 - Red Wolf
- 2014 - Bones
- 2015 - Chicken on a Chain
- 2016 - Bushwacker
- 2017 - Mudslinger
- 2018 - Pearl Harbor
- 2019 - Bodacious
- 2021 - Asteroid
- 2023 - Bruiser
- 2024 - Smooth Operator
- 2025 - Big Bucks
- 2026 - Promiseland

== Ty Murray Top Hand Award ==
First awarded in 2018 to Trevor Brazile, Lewis Feild, and Tom Ferguson, the Ty Murray Top Hand Award, is awarded to a rodeo athlete who is not eligible for the Ring of Honor Award. The award connects the PBR with its traditional past. Athletes are chosen who represent strong values and character who have made a significant mark on the sport. The award is named after 9-time Professional Rodeo Cowboys Association (PRCA) World Champion and Ring of Honor inductee Ty Murray, a co-founder of the PBR.

=== Recipients ===
2018

- Trevor Brazile
- Lewis Feild
- Tom Ferguson

2019

- Larry Mahan
- Phil Lyne

2021

- Guy Allen

2023

- Jim Shoulders

2024

- Casey Tibbs

2025

- Roy Cooper

2026

- Charmayne James
- Dean Oliver

== Professional Bull Riders Champions ==
Heroes and Legends lists the Ring of Honor, Sharon Shoulders Award, Jim Shoulders Lifetime Achievement Award, Brand of Honor, and Ty Murray Top Hand Award. The List of Professional Bull Riders Champions article presents a list of major champions and honors won by Professional Bull Riders.

== See also ==
- Professional Bull Riders
- Professional Rodeo Cowboys Association
- Canadian Professional Rodeo Association
- National Rodeo Hall of Fame
- Bull Riding Hall of Fame
- ProRodeo Hall of Fame
- Canadian Pro Rodeo Hall of Fame
- List of Professional Bull Riders Champions
- List of ProRodeo Hall of Fame inductees
- List of Canadian Pro Rodeo Hall of Fame inductees
