= Rodeo Hall of Fame (disambiguation) =

The National Rodeo Hall of Fame is part of the National Cowboy & Western Heritage Museum in Oklahoma City, Oklahoma, United States.

Rodeo Hall of Fame may also refer to

- Bull Riding Hall of Fame, located in Fort Worth, Texas, United States
- Canadian Pro Rodeo Hall of Fame, located in Ponoka, Alberta, Canada
- ProRodeo Hall of Fame, located in Colorado Springs, Colorado, United States

== See also ==
- National Cowgirl Museum and Hall of Fame, located in Fort Worth, Texas
