= Bull Riding Hall of Fame =

- Established: 2012
- Location: Cowtown Coliseum; Fort Worth Stockyards; Fort Worth, Texas, U.S.
- Type: Hall of Fame
- Website: Bull Riding Hall of Fame

The Bull Riding Hall of Fame, located at Cowtown Coliseum in the Fort Worth Stockyards in Fort Worth, Texas, United States, is a hall of fame for the sport of bull riding. It is incorporated as a non-profit organization in the State of Texas, and created to "recognize, memorialize, and applaud the bull riders, bullfighters, bulls, stock contractors, events, and individuals who have made a historic contribution and attained stellar performance in the sport." Membership is open to fans worldwide.

The Bull Riding Hall of Fame intends to honor all of the bull riding champions. But the hall also has other goals to preserve the history of bull riding, housing "inductee exhibits, accomplishments, photos, videos, personal effects and much more". The Bull Riding Hall of Fame has four categories of induction: Bull Riders, Bull Fighters, Bulls, and Legends.

The inaugural class of inductions was in 2015. The hall opened its doors to the public in 2016.

== History ==
The founders created the Bull Riding Hall of Fame, Inc., "to recognize bull riders, bull fighters, bulls, organizations, competitive events, and stock contractors that have achieved the ultimate level of performance in the sport of bull riding." The organization's activities include historical presentation, visitor education, event hosting, and managing via multiple committees.

The founders were involved in overseeing the building of the foundation hall, and also maintaining the Bull Riding Hall of Fame museum at Cowtown Coliseum in Fort Worth. Husband and wife team, Bill and Tammi Putnam, were co-founders and on the board of directors.

== Organization ==
The Bull Riding Hall of Fame Museum is located at Cowtown Coliseum, Fort Worth Stockyards, Fort Worth, Texas.

One class of nominees is inducted into the hall each year. Inductees are selected by the nominations and votes of Members, which includes Inductees. Annual and Lifetime memberships along with Gold Rowel Partnerships are available for individuals, couples, companies and organizations. Sponsors can be an individual, couple, organization, or corporation.

From 2015 through 2019, the annual induction ceremony was held at Cowtown Coliseum. Since 2020, it has been held at Billy Bob's Texas.

== List of Inductees ==
The Bull Riding Hall of Fame has inducted individuals from the Professional Rodeo Cowboys Association (PRCA), International Professional Rodeo Association (IPRA), and Professional Bull Riders (PBR).

The inductees, human and animal, are among the most notable individuals and organizations in the sport.

More than half of them are also inductees of the ProRodeo Hall of Fame, including bullfighter Wick Peth. Others include PRCA bull rider Lane Frost, famous for his duel with Red Rock in the Challenge of the Champions.

From the Professional Bull Riders (PBR) there are several Ring of Honor holders from the Heroes and Legends Celebration which is the PBR equivalent of a Hall of Fame. Chris Shivers, a holder of several records in the PBR and a 2013 Ring of Honor holder. Another Ring of Honor holder is bull rider Tuff Hedeman, one of the riders who conquered Bodacious. Hedeman competed in the PRCA and the PBR. He is also in the ProRodeo Hall of Fame.

Out of the three bulls that have been inducted as of 2017, two of them are also in the ProRodeo Hall of Fame. Tornado was inducted in 1979. Bodacious was inducted in 1999. Bodacious was the only bull to win the PRCA Bucking Bull of the Year and the PBR World Champion Bull titles in 1995, until Bruiser did it in 2017.

=== 2015 Inaugural Inductees ===
Inductee	Birthdate	Deathdate	Induction Category
Don Gay	September 8, 1953	Living	Bull Rider
Jim Shoulders	May 13, 1928	June 20, 2007	Bull Rider
Warren G. Brown	January 18, 1921	March 20, 1987	Bull Rider
Harry Tompkins	October 5, 1927	June 29, 2018	Bull Rider
George Paul	March 3, 1947	July 30, 1970	Bull Rider
Larry Mahan	November 21, 1943	May 7, 2023	Bull Rider
Skipper Voss	March 15, 1944	November 17, 2026	Bull Fighter
Wick Peth	April 15, 1930	December 27, 2019	Bull Fighter
George Paul Memorial Bull Riding	N/A	N/A	Legend
Mesquite Rodeo - Neal Gay	June 25, 1926	August 11, 2022	Legend
V-61	Circa 1962	1974	Bull

=== 2016 Inductees ===
Inductee	Birthdate	Deathdate	Induction Category
Myrtis Dightman	May 7, 1935	Living	Bull Rider
John Quintana	December 3, 1947	March 25, 2013	Bull Rider
Gary Leffew	September 23, 1944	Living	Bull Rider
Jim "Razor" Sharp	October 6, 1965	Living	Bull Rider
Terry Don West	October 7, 1965	Living	Bull Rider
Jack Wiseman	November 5, 1943	December 1, 2015	Bull Rider
Tuff Hedeman	March 2, 1963	Living	Bull Rider
Kajun Kidd (D.J. Gaudin)	October 28, 1929	June 11, 2015	Bull Fighter
Harry Vold	January 29, 1924	March 13, 2017	Legend
Steiner Rodeo Co.	N/A	N/A	Legend
Tornado	1957	1972	Bull

=== 2017 Inductees ===
Inductee	Birthdate	Deathdate	Induction Category
Denny Flynn	April 21, 1951	Living	Bull Rider
Bill Kornell	March 13, 1944	Living	Bull Rider
Dick Griffith	September 13, 1913	August 10, 1984	Bull Rider
Chris Shivers	December 30, 1978	Living	Bull Rider
Randy Magers	May 5, 1945	Living	Bull Rider
Lane Frost	October 12, 1963	July 30, 1989	Bull Rider
Rob Smets	September 11, 1959	Living	Bull Fighter
Clem McSpadden	November 9, 1925	July 7, 2008	Legend
Bob Tallman	October 25, 1947	Living	Legend
Bodacious	1988	May 16, 2000	Bull

=== 2018 Inductees ===
Inductee	Birthdate	Deathdate	Induction Category
Ronnie Rossen	July 7, 1937	August 16, 1991	Bull Rider
Ty Murray	October 11, 1969	Living	Bull Rider
Glen Bird	November 10, 1945	Living	Bull Rider
Wacey Cathey	June 29, 1953	Living	Bull Rider
Jerome Davis	August 10, 1972	Living	Bull Rider
Ted Nuce	January 19, 1961	Living	Bull Rider
Bob Wegner	March 10, 1934	March 30, 2014	Bull Rider
Miles Hare	August 17, 1955	Living	Bull Fighter
Ferrell Butler	October 16, 1936	Living	Legend
Cotton Rosser - Flying U Rodeo	August 5, 1928	June 22, 2022	Legend
Oscar		1983	Bull

=== 2019 Inductees ===
Inductee	Birthdate	Deathdate	Induction Category
Butch Kirby	April 24, 1955	Living	Bull Rider
Charlie Sampson	July 2, 1957	Living	Bull Rider
Bobby Steiner	November 27, 1951	Living	Bull Rider
Jerome Robinson	October 16, 1947	January 9, 2022	Bull Rider
Ken Roberts	January 22, 1918	September 13, 1975	Bull Rider
Bobby Berger	June 22, 1945	Living	Bull Rider
Cody Custer	August 30, 1965	Living	Bull Rider
Leon Coffee	October 11, 1954	Living	Bull Fighter
Beutler Rodeo Company	N/A	N/A	Legend
Jerry Gustafson	December 6, 1946	September 1, 2025	Legend
Old Spec	1953		Bull

=== 2020 Inductees ===
Inductee	Birthdate	Deathdate	Induction Category	Refs
Bobby DelVecchio	March 20, 1957	Living	Bull Rider	
Justin McBride	August 7, 1979	Living	Bull Rider	
Marvin Paul Shoulders	February 27, 1951	Living	Bull Rider	
Doug Brown	March 8, 1946	Living	Bull Rider	
Sandy Kirby	April 8, 1949	Living	Bull Rider	
Smokey Snyder	June 1, 1908	October 24, 1965	Bull Rider	
Adriano Morães	April 20, 1970	Living	Bull Rider	
Joe Baumgartner	September 9, 1966	Living	Bull Fighter	
Lecile Harris	November 6, 1936	February 12, 2020	Legend	
Hadley Barrett	September 18, 1929	March 2, 2017	Legend	
Bushwacker	June 1, 2006	July 2, 2024	Bull	

=== 2021 Inductees ===
Inductee	Birthdate	Deathdate	Induction Category	Refs
Michael Gaffney	July 4, 1969	Living	Bull Rider	
Ben Jordan	November 30, 1931	March 19, 2022	Bull Rider	
Mike White	September 26, 1976	Living	Bull Rider	
John Clark	June 18, 1936	June 8, 2025	Bull Rider	
Duane Howard	August 2, 1933	October 1, 2015	Bull Rider	
Phil Lyne	January 18, 1947	August 14, 2026	Bull Rider	
Willie Thomas	January 30, 1930	April 24, 2020	Bull Rider	
Clint Branger	April 7, 1964	Living	Bull Rider	
Quail Dobbs	August 27, 1941	January 15, 2014	Bull Fighter	
Bad Company Rodeo			Legend	
Red Rock	1976	June 8, 1994	Bull	

=== 2022 Inductees ===
Inductee	Birthdate	Deathdate	Induction Category
J.W. Harris	July 14, 1986	Living	Bull Rider
Guilherme Marchi	July 22, 1982	Living	Bull Rider
Cody Hart	April 20, 1978	Living	Bull Rider
Ed LeTourneau	September 18, 1935	January 18, 2026	Bull Rider
Scott Mendes	July 4, 1969	Living	Bull Rider
Troy Dunn	May 8, 1967	Living	Bull Rider
Matt Austin	September 3, 1982	Living	Bull Rider
Billy Minick	January 10, 1939	Living	Bull Rider
Rex Dunn	December 31, 1955	October 8, 2012	Bull Fighter
Bryan McDonald	October 10	Living	Legend
Little Yellow Jacket	August 20, 1996	September 19, 2011	Bull

=== 2023 Inductees ===
Inductee	Birthdate	Deathdate	Induction Category
Cody Snyder	March 28, 1963	Living	Bull Rider
Ricky Lindsey	September 30, 1960	November 12, 2025	Bull Rider
Dickey Cox	July 12, 1939	March 20, 2015	Bull Rider
Kenny Wilcox	1954	Living	Bull Rider
John "Stormy" Gloor	July 16, 1952	November 16, 2019	Bull Rider
Ronnie Bowman	May 9, 1941	Living	Bull Rider
R.C. Bales	July 10, 1930	August 16, 2023	Bull Rider
Rick Chatman	May 1, 1956	March 25, 2014	Bull Fighter
Cody Lambert	December 2, 1961	Living	Legend
Bernis Johnson	September 19, 1932	October 27, 2022	Legend
Cowtown	1978	1993	Bull

=== 2024 Inductees ===
Inductee	Birthdate	Deathdate	Induction Category
Johnie Schneider	May 3, 1904	April 4, 1982	Bull Rider
J.B. Mauney	January 9, 1987	Living	Bull Rider
Pete Gay	March 2, 1952	Living	Bull Rider
J.W. Hart	March 28, 1975	Living	Bull Rider
Gene Lyda	June 20, 1947	Living	Bull Rider
Kody Lostroh	September 18, 1985	Living	Bull Rider
Ricky Bolin	November 24, 1958	Living	Bull Rider
Frank Newsom	October 28	Living	Bull Fighter
Roy Carter	November 25, 1961	Living	Legend
Chad Berger	August 16, 1961	Living	Legend
Bruiser	March 2, 2011	May 17, 2022	Bull

=== 2025 Inductees ===
Inductee	Birthdate	Deathdate	Induction Category
Aaron Semas	September 1, 1966	Living	Bull Rider
Blue Stone	May 26, 1978	March 13, 2022	Bull Rider
Bill Nelson	1944	Living	Bull Rider
Glen McIlvain	August 18, 1960	Living	Bull Rider
Mike Bandy		Living	Bull Rider
Silvano Alves	November 23, 1987	Living	Bull Rider
Cody Hancock	June 20, 1975	Living	Bull Rider
Seth "Shorty" Gorham	August 19, 1978	Living	Bull Fighter
Dr. Tandy Freeman	November 24, 1957	Living	Legend
Flint Rasmussen	January 25, 1968	Living	Legend
Pacific Bell	April 1, 1981	1993	Bull

=== 2026 Inductees ===
Inductee	Birthdate	Deathdate	Induction Category
Owen Washburn	July 15, 1972	Living	Bull Rider
Joe Wimberly	September 16, 1961	Living	Bull Rider
Cody Teel	June 9, 1992	Living	Bull Rider
Mike Lee	June 11, 1983	Living	Bull Rider
Shane Proctor	March 24, 1985	Living	Bull Rider
Wesley Silcox	May 30, 1985	Living	Bull Rider
Ednei Caminhas	June 10, 1975	Living	Bull Rider
Jimmy Anderson	September 6, 1953	December 5, 2008	Bull Fighter
D&H Cattle Company			Legend
Ardmore Jaycees Bull Riding			Legend
Tiger	Circa late 1960s		Bull

== See also ==
- Lists of rodeo performers
- List of ProRodeo Hall of Fame inductees
- Professional Bull Riders
- Professional Rodeo Cowboys Association
- ProRodeo Hall of Fame
- National Rodeo Hall of Fame
