= Lewis Feild =

American rodeo cowboy (1956-2016)

Lewis Feild (October 28, 1956 – February 15, 2016) was an American professional rodeo cowboy. He specialized in bareback bronc riding and saddle bronc riding and competed in the Professional Rodeo Cowboys Association (PRCA) circuit. He was the All-Around World Champion from 1985 to 1987 at the National Finals Rodeo (NFR). He was also the Bareback Riding World Champion from 1985 to 1986. The ProRodeo Hall of Fame inducted him in 1992 in the all-around category.

== Early life ==
He was born on October 28, 1956, to Keith and True Feild in Peoa, Utah. He was of British and Scandinavian descent. Feild was raised near Peoa in the Kamas Valley, where Feild saw his first rodeo. "It was the most exciting thing I had ever seen, to watch those cowboys stay on those broncs. It was love at first sight," said Feild. Feild started riding calves after that, which he did at his parents' ranch in Peoa. It was in Ogden at the Golden Spike Rodeo where he rode his first bucking horse. "It was a junior rodeo and it was not a full-sized horse, but it bucked and I stayed on. They gave me a buckle for an award ... first thing I ever won."

When he grew older, he attended college. With the assistance of an intercollegiate rodeo scholarship, he attended Utah Valley Community College, now known as Utah Valley University, and Weber State University. At Utah Valley University, he qualified for the National High School Finals Rodeo three times. He also earned three National Finals appearances. Then, in 1980, with some assistance from friends, he turned professional.

== Career ==
Feild competed on the PRCA rodeo circuit throughout his professional rodeo career. He was the All-Around World Champion from 1985 to 1987, and the Bareback Riding World Champion from 1985 to 1986 at the NFR. He won the NFR All-Around Average from 1986 to 1988. He won the NFR Average in Bareback Riding in 1984 and 1986. Feild became the first rough-stock cowboy since Larry Mahan to earn all-around world titles since 1973. In 1980, he was the PRCA Resistol Rookie of the Year.

In the years 1981, 1988, and 1991, Feild won the Linderman Award. This award is given to the cowboy who works both ends of the arena (this means timed events on one side and rough-stock on the other side) and has the highest earnings. Feild was also an established team roper.

In 1987, Feild took the record for single-season earnings in the bareback bronc event to $114,657. In that same year, he also set a new single rodeo earnings record of $75,219. He held the record for single-season arena earnings until 1986 until Ty Murray set a new record of $213,771. In 1990, Feild was the first rough-stock contestant to win more than $1 million in his career in the PRCA. He was the third cowboy to do it at any level. Tom Ferguson did it first and Roy Cooper did it second.

According to many personnel, Feild was a staple at the Ogden Pioneer Days rodeo in Ogden, Utah, for as long as they can remember. The committee made him the focus of an opening act which lasted around 10 years up until his death. He was such an icon to the rodeo that it inducted him into its Utah Cowboy Hall of Fame. It also recognized him as the Utah County honoree for the National Day of the American Cowboy. Each of these two honors were awarded to Feild inaugurally in Ogden.

"Someday, when rodeo people look back at what I've done, I'd like them to say these things: that I rode tough; I could ride with pain and courage; that I was a fierce competitor in the arena, but a quiet, respectable man outside the gate. I just want to be remembered as a cowboy," said the soft-spoken champion. "That probably says it all."

== Personal life ==
He coached the UVSC rodeo team and lived in Elk Ridge, Utah, with his wife Veronica. They had three children and thirteen grandchildren.

== Death and legacy ==
Feild died on February 15, 2016, in Elk Ridge, Utah, at the age of 59 after battling stage 4 pancreatic cancer. His son Kaycee Feild won six World Bareback Bronc Champion titles at the NFR from 2011 to 2014 and 2020 to 2021. He also has won four NFR Average titles.

== Awards ==
- 1980 Bareback Riding Rookie of the Year
- 1981, 1988 Linderman Award
- 1986-1988 NFR All-Around Average Champion
- 1984, 1986 NFR Bareback Riding Average Champion
- 1985-1987 PRCA All-Around World Champion
- 1985-1986 PRCA Bareback Riding World Champion

== Honors ==
- 1985 Rodeo Hall of Fame of the National Cowboy and Western Heritage Museum
- 1992 ProRodeo Hall of Fame
- 1997 Utah Sports Hall of Fame, 2nd inducted after Earl Bascom
- 2012 Utah Cowboy and Western Heritage Museum
- 2015 Pendleton Round-Up and Happy Canyon Hall of Fame
- 2017 Molalla Walk of Fame
- 2018 PBR Ty Murray Top Hand Award
- The Lewis Feild Bareback Riding Award is administered by the Utah Sports Commission.
- Listed in the 50 greatest sports figures of the century from each of the 50 states.

== Sources ==
- Biography on the ProRodeo Hall of Fame's website
- ProRodeo Records and Stats (PDF). Professional Rodeo Cowboy Association. 2017. pp. 297–298.
- Wrangler NFR (PDF). Professional Rodeo Cowboy Association. 2017. p. 373.
- PRCAAwards (PDF). Professional Rodeo Cowboy Association. 2017. p. 623.
- PRCAAwards (PDF). Professional Rodeo Cowboy Association. 2017. p. 625.
