= Rob Smets =

American bullfighter

Robert Edward Smets (born September 11, 1959, Palo Alto, California), known professionally as The Kamikaze Kid, is an American former professional rodeo bullfighter.

== Biography ==
Smets was born in Palo Alto, California to Bill and Ebe Smets. As a child, he lived in Thailand, Singapore, Puerto Rico, and Australia. After returning to the United States as a teenager, he lived in San Martin, California and attended Palma High School in Salinas. He entered high school rodeos starting in his sophomore year.

In 2012, Rob Smets starred in Jägermeister's "A Stronger Bond" television and digital campaign.

== Career ==
While bull riding as a teenager, Smets taunted some of the bullfighters for not protecting riders well enough after the riders fell. They challenged him to try being a bullfighter himself, which he did. He made a name for himself early on, distracting bulls after riders had fallen, so the riders could leave the ring safely.

During the 20 years of the Wrangler Bullfighting Tour which culminated at the National Finals Rodeo (NFR) from 1981-2000, Smets was a top-six finisher 17 times. He also won the championship five times, a record. He was selected six times to be a cowboy protection bullfighter at the NFR (1983, 1985, 1987, 1989-1990, 2000). He was also an eight-time Professional Bull Riders (PBR) World Finals bullfighter (1994-1995, 2000-2005). At the 2001 PBR World Finals, Smets no longer wore his traditional baggy clown outfit and began wearing a sport jersey and shorts that featured his sponsors' logos. This was the blueprint for future PBR bullfighter outfits as in 2003, all bullfighters in the organization would stop wearing traditional clown outfits and make-up and trade them for sport jerseys and shorts with corporate sponsor logos. In subsequent years, many bullfighters in other organizations would also adopt the sport jersey and shorts look, but keep their make-up.

In 2006, Smets was inducted into the ProRodeo Hall of Fame. He was also inducted into the Texas Rodeo Cowboy Hall of Fame in April 2010. Smets came out of retirement one final time at the 2011 PBR World Finals, where he fought the first three bulls of the first round of the event. He wore his old baggy outfit that he used prior to the 2001 PBR World Finals. Also, he was the inaugural recipient of the PBR Jim Shoulders Lifetime Achievement Award in 2011. In 2017, Smets was inducted into the Bull Riding Hall of Fame in the Bull Fighters category. In 2019, he was inducted into the National Rodeo Hall of Fame of the National Cowboy & Western Heritage Museum.

Smets was also a stock contractor, although he only owned one bull. But that one bull was a highly ranked PBR bucking bull, #80 Jeremiah. The bull's full name was Jeremiah 33:3 for the bible verse. Jeremiah was active from 2013 to 2017 and began bucking on the elite Built Ford Tough Series (BFTS) circuit in 2014. In 2015, Jeremiah was chosen as a world champion bull contender at the 2015 PBR BFTS World Finals.

== Injuries ==
During his bullfighting career, Smets was injured many times, including suffering a broken neck three times, in 1992, 1996, and 2006. Although these injuries often paralyze people who suffer them, Smets' main problem from them was limited motion in his neck. He retired from bullfighting in 2006, after breaking his neck for the third time. Smets had also been gored by a bull's horn and had broken a leg.

== Personal ==
Smets and his wife, Carla, married in 1993, and they have four daughters, Corey, Dylan, Josie, and Sammy. They live on a ranch in Merkel, Texas. Rob Smets is a Christian who evangelizes on his public Facebook page and on the public Facebook page he created for his bucking bull, Jeremiah 33:3.

== Honors ==
- 2006 ProRodeo Hall of Fame
- 2008 St. Paul Rodeo Hall of Fame
- 2010 Texas Rodeo Cowboy Hall of Fame
- 2011 PBR Jim Shoulders Lifetime Achievement Award
- 2014 California Rodeo Salinas Hall of Fame
- 2017 Bull Riding Hall of Fame
- 2017 Molalla Walk of Fame
- 2019 Rodeo Hall of Fame of the National Cowboy & Western Heritage Museum
- 2020 Original Wrangler Bullfights Hall of Fame
- 2023 Ellensburg Rodeo Hall of Fame
