= Denny Flynn =

American bull rider

Denny Flynn (born April 21, 1951) is an American former professional rodeo cowboy who specialized in bull riding. He is from Charleston, Arkansas.

== Career ==
In 1969, Flynn won the Arkansas High School All-Around rodeo title. He earned his Professional Rodeo Cowboys Association (PRCA) card in 1973. In 1975, in Salt Lake City, Utah, he was gored by a bull. The horn penetrated ten inches into his body, missing his heart by a half-inch. He rode to the hospital in a truck holding his wound in his hands. In 1979, in Palestine, Illinois, Flynn rode Steiner's Red Lightning for a score of 98 out of 100. This broke the previous record for roughstock competition, and is now the second-highest ever recorded ride score in PRCA history for a roughstock event. He qualified for the National Finals Rodeo (NFR) ten times, winning the event average three times. In 1981, he suffered a concussion on his sixth ride, but managed to ride 9 of 10 bulls to win the championship. In 1983, he broke an ankle on his ninth bull ride. He needed to ride a tenth bull to win, so he rode it with his broken ankle.

== Honors ==
- 2002 PBR Ring of Honor
- 2010 ProRodeo Hall of Fame
- 2010 Rodeo Hall of Fame of the National Cowboy & Western Heritage Museum
- 2017 Bull Riding Hall of Fame
- 2019 Arkansas Sports Hall of Fame

== Retirement ==
Flynn retired at the age of 34 in 1985. When Red Lightning retired in 1987, Flynn rode one more ceremonial ride on him.
