= Tom R. Ferguson =

American rodeo cowboy

Tom R. Ferguson (born December 20, 1950) is an American former professional rodeo cowboy. He was the Professional Rodeo Cowboys Association (PRCA) World Champion all-around cowboy for six consecutive years from 1974 to 1979; breaking the previous mark of five consecutive titles held by Larry Mahan. He was also the 1974 World Champion calf roper and the World Champion steer wrestler in 1977 and 1978. In 1999, he was inducted into the ProRodeo Hall of Fame.

== Early life ==
Born in Tahlequah, Oklahoma, United States, on December 20, 1950, Tom Ferguson moved to California at the age of 3 and was later chosen for the California Polytechnic State University rodeo team. The team took home multiple National Intercollegiate Rodeo Association championships, before Ferguson turned professional and returned to Miami, Oklahoma, in 1973. He joined the Rodeo Cowboys Association (RCA), which later renamed itself to the Professional Rodeo Cowboys Association (PRCA).

== Rodeo career ==
Though Larry Mahan was the first to have six world all-around titles, Ferguson won six consecutively. The 5-foot-11 Native American rodeo cowboy specialized in calf roping and steer wrestling. In 1994, Ty Murray broke Mahan's and Ferguson's record of six titles and tied Ferguson's record of having won six titles consecutively. In 1998, Murray won his seventh title, surpassing both of them and holding the record for all-around titles at seven titles. In 2010, Trevor Brazile won his eighth all-around title, surpassing them all. In 2018, Brazile won his 14th all-around title.

In his first year as a professional rodeo cowboy, Ferguson came in second in the National Finals Rodeo (NFR) in the All-Around Cowboy event. He accumulated more than $1 million in his rodeo career and was among the first rodeo cowboys to hire a manager.

In 1974, he won the calf roping world championship and came second in the steer wrestling event. In 1977 and 1978, he won the steer wrestling world championship. Ferguson retired from rodeo in the late 1980s.

== Honors ==
- The Encyclopedia of Oklahoma History and Culture by the Oklahoma Historical Society
- 1974 Rodeo Hall of Fame of the National Cowboy and Western Heritage Museum
- 1997 Ellensburg Rodeo Hall of Fame
- 1999 ProRodeo Hall of Fame
- 2018 PBR Ty Murray Top Hand Award
