= Ted Nuce =

American bull rider

Personal information
- Born: January 19, 1961 (age 65)
- Height: 5 ft 6 in (1.68 m) (1986)
- Weight: 145 lb (66 kg) (1986)

Sport
- Sport: Rodeo
- Event: Bull riding
- Turned pro: 1982
- Retired: 1996

Achievements and titles
- Highest world ranking: 1985 PRCA world champion bull rider

Ted Nuce (born January 19, 1961) is an American former professional rodeo cowboy who specialized in bull riding. He was the Professional Rodeo Cowboys Association (PRCA) World Champion bull rider in 1985, and was a co-founder of the Professional Bull Riders (PBR) in 1992. In his career, he qualified for the National Finals Rodeo (NFR) 14 consecutive times from 1982 through 1995 and qualified for the first two PBR World Finals in 1994 and 1995. He won the inaugural PBR World Finals event in 1994.

A native of Escalon, California (although he graduated from Manteca High School) Nuce turned pro in 1982. He was the champion of the PRCA California Circuit in bull riding in eight seasons: 1982, 1983, 1985, 1989, 1990, 1991, 1992, and 1994.

In September 1996, Nuce retired from bull riding. That October at the PBR World Finals, he was inducted into the PBR Ring of Honor, an award "given annually to individuals who have made a significant and lasting contribution to the sport of professional bull riding, both in and out of the arena." Nuce was one of the four inaugural honorees. In 2009, he was inducted into the ProRodeo Hall of Fame. In 2018, he was inducted into the Bull Riding Hall of Fame.

Nuce was selected to be the coach for Team USA-Wolves, an all-Native American bull riding squad, for the 2020 PBR Global Cup in Arlington, Texas.

In 2023, Nuce was ranked No. 18 on the list of the top 30 bull riders in PBR history.

== PRCA World Championship results ==
Results per the PRCA World Champions archive.

| Year | Finish | Winnings (US$) |
|---|---|---|
| 1982 | 8th | 45,748 |
| 1983 | 9th | 51,027 |
| 1984 | 4th | 59,456 |
| 1985 | 1st | 107,872 |
| 1986 | 2nd | 115,218 |
| 1987 | 2nd | 101,494 |
| 1988 | 2nd | 89,233 |
| 1989 | 9th | 58,108 |
| 1990 | 6th | 70,964 |
| 1991 | 2nd | 96,271 |
| 1992 | 14th | 51,796 |
| 1993 | 3rd | 80,936 |
| 1994 | 6th | 91,965 |
| 1995 | 16th | 50,963 |
