= Cody Snyder =

Canadian bull rider

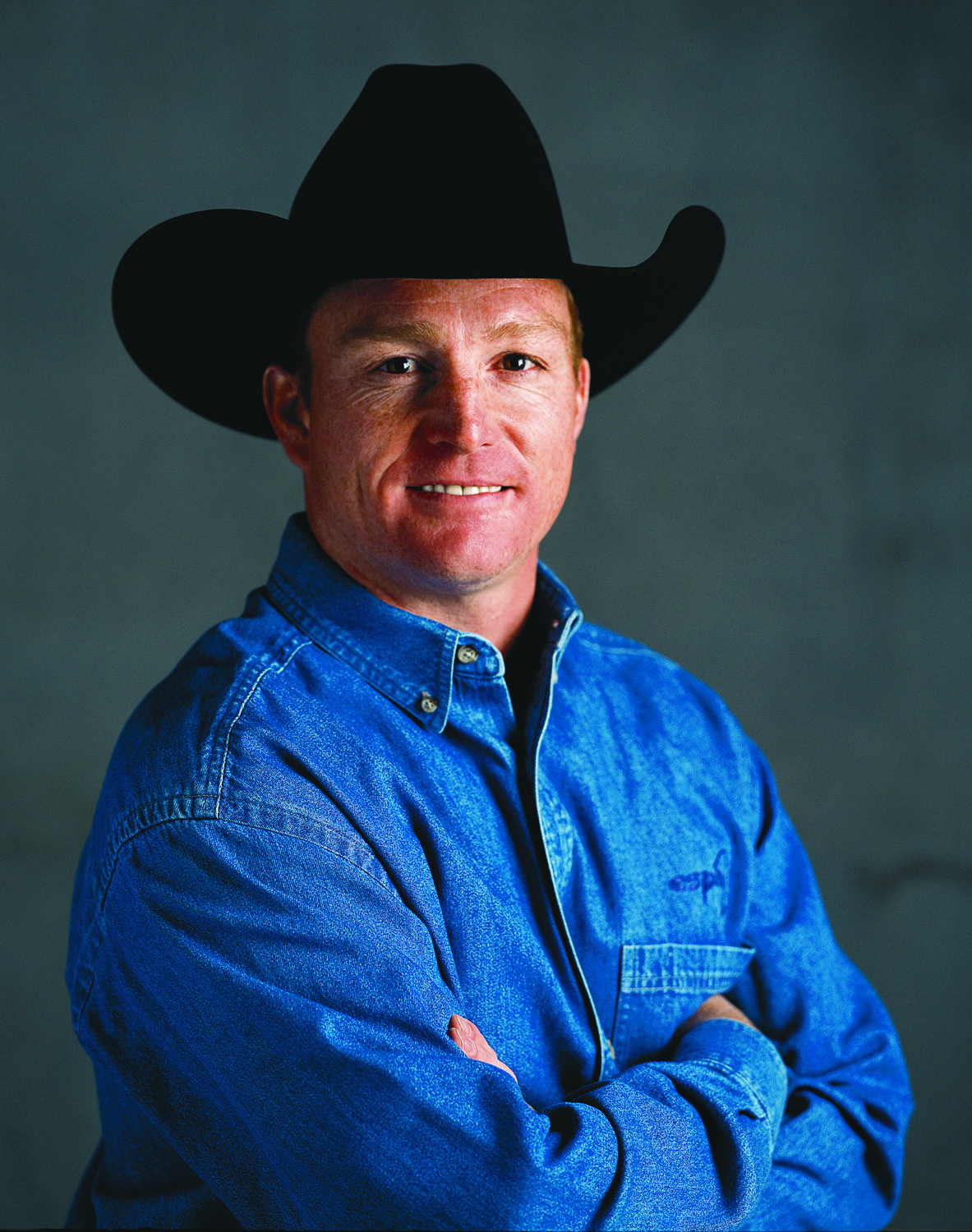
- Snyder in 2010

Personal information
- Nationality: Canadian
- Born: Cody Snyder; 1962 or 1963 (age 62–63) Redcliff, Alberta, Canada
- Height: 1.75 m (5 ft 9 in)
- Weight: 75 kg (165 lb) (Note: Height and weight in 1983 when winning the Bull-riding World Championship.)

Sport
- Sport: Rodeo
- Event: Bull riding
- Turned pro: 1980
- Retired: 1993

Achievements and titles
- Highest world ranking: 1983 PRCA Bull Riding World Champion; 1986 CPRA Bull Riding Champion

Cody Snyder (born 1962 or 1963) is a Canadian former professional rodeo cowboy who specialized in bull riding. He is currently a bull-riding event producer. In 1983, Snyder became the first Canadian to win the Professional Rodeo Cowboys Association (PRCA) bull riding world championship. He holds the highest-scored bull ride in the Canadian Professional Rodeo Association (CPRA), scoring 95 points in 1983. He is an inductee of the Canadian Pro Rodeo Hall of Fame, Professional Bull Riders (PBR) Ring of Honor, Alberta Sports Hall of Fame and the Bull Riding Hall of Fame. Since his athletic retirement in 1993, Snyder has produced over 400 bull-riding events under his company Bullbustin' Inc. He has also appeared as a colour commentator for televised rodeo events including the Calgary Stampede.

== Early life ==
Cody Snyder was born in 1962 or 1963 in Redcliff, Alberta, near Medicine Hat. (Note: While several sources state that Snyder was born in the city of Medicine Hat, his biography at Bullbustin' states that he was born in the adjacent town of Redcliff.) He was raised on a ranch and his father and uncle were both rodeo riders. He took part in a calf-riding competition when he was five, (Note: Snyder's first rodeo performance was in calf roping in Walsh, Alberta, in 1968.) began riding junior steers when he was eight years old, and rode his first bull at the age of 12. He trained under hall-of-fame bull rider Dale "Hoot" Rose, (Note: Dale Rose was posthumously inducted into the Canadian Professional Rodeo Association Hall-of-Fame as a rodeo "Legend" in 2008, three years after his student, Snyder, was inducted into the Hall.) who had an indoor arena 24 km (15 mi) away, stocked with bulls and steers. From age 14 Snyder rode a half-dozen bulls each night and at age 15 he became the Canadian amateur bull-riding champion. Snyder was also a well-regarded amateur boxer. In 1979, at the age of 16, he won the Canadian Cowboys Association bull-riding championship and obtained his official competitor cards to perform as a member of the US-based Professional Rodeo Cowboys Association (PRCA) and the Canadian Rodeo Cowboys Association (CRCA; renamed the Canadian Professional Rodeo Association [CPRA] in 1980). In order to train and compete full time, Snyder withdrew from school in grade 11.

== Bull-riding career ==
In 1982, when he was 19 years old, Snyder led the CPRA national bull riding standings. The following year, Snyder ranked second in the world and performed in a special Presidential Command Performance Rodeo in Landover, Maryland, for then-US President Ronald Reagan. Snyder qualified for the 1983 National Finals Rodeo (NFR) in Oklahoma City, Oklahoma, where he became the first Canadian to win the PRCA bull-riding world championship. During that season, Snyder achieved a 95-point ride on Northcott's Confusion (Note: Northcott's No. 96 Confusion was so-named because it bucked with no set pattern. It was successfully ridden (for 8 seconds) only 6 times in over 200 attempts in competition, and was selected for the CFR 9 times and the NFR 7 times. Confusion was inducted into the Canadian Professional Rodeo Hall of Fame in 2016.) at the Canadian Finals Rodeo (CFR), a CPRA bull-riding record which has not been surpassed as of July 2023. (Note: On 7 May 1994, 11 years after Snyder set his 95-point CPRA bull-riding record and 1 year after he retired from the rodeo circuit, Montana bull rider Scott Breding set a Canadian high-point bull-riding record with 97 points on Sugar Ray at Cody Snyder's World Champion Bullbustin' in Calgary. Snyder happily acknowledged that Breding broke his point record, but sources hold that Snyder maintains the CPRA record as of July 2023. It may be that Breding, who was semi-retired, was not a registered CPRA competitor or that the Bullbustin' event was not CPRA-sanctioned.)

Snyder qualified for the NFR again in 1984, 1986 and 1987. For the 1985 season, Snyder rode on the PRCA Winston Pro Tour, which consisted of top-tier professional rodeo athletes drafted into 18 individually sponsored teams. Snyder was the bull rider for the Willie Nelson Wrangler Team, which debuted at the Coors Challenge in Austin, Texas, on September 5.

Snyder qualified for the CFR in 1982 through 1989 and in 1991, tying the record for consecutive qualifications in bull-riding and setting a record for non-consecutive qualifications. Among those years, he led the CPRA standings (in earned prize winnings) for bull riding in 1982, 1984, 1986 and 1989. Snyder won the CPRA bull riding championship in 1986. He also holds the CPRA record for the most bulls ridden consecutively in CFR competition, with 14 performances in the 1982 through 1984 Finals.

While Snyder was competing at the 1987 CFR, the bull he was riding made a sudden lurch and Snyder was heaved over his hand, resulting in a scaphoid fracture in his left wrist. In February 1992 he withdrew from the rodeo circuit to have surgery on the injury, then more than four years old. The bone was surgically reconstructed with bone from his hip, reinforced with three screws. However, he continued to experience problems with his left hand opening while bull riding. After suffering a dislocated shoulder at the Fort Worth Stock Show & Rodeo in February 1993, Snyder officially announced his retirement.

Snyder served as a CFR judge from 1992 through 1995 and was named CPRA Cowboy of the Year in 1994.

== Event producer ==
Through 1992, Snyder felt a growing excitement about all-bullriding rodeo events which were drawing record audiences in the US, having been outspoken about the lack of recognition received by bull riders as athletes. He moved from Medicine Hat to Calgary in 1993 with his wife, marketing representative Rhonda Schlenker-Snyder, (Note: Snyder met his wife Rhonda when he was paraded through Medicine Hat after winning the bull riding world championship in 1983; they married in 1990.) and together they founded Bullbustin' Inc., a professional bull riding production company. In May 1993 they produced their first event, Cody Snyder's World Champion Bull Bustin' at the Stampede Corral in Calgary, as a spectacle that treated its athletes as stars. Bullbustin' Inc. was among the first to incorporate pyrotechnics into their bull riding events.

Bullbustin' has produced over 400 bull-riding events. More than 250 of these were Professional Bull Riders (PBR) sanctioned events, including the first Canadian PBR event in 1993, the first PBR Bud Light Cup Series events held in Canada, and the first PBR Canadian National Finals in 2006. They have also produced over 30 events for the PRCA Xtreme Bulls tour, including the largest one-day bull-riding event at Reliant Stadium in Houston, Texas, with over 70,000 people in attendance. Some of these events have been televised on major US networks and cable specialty channels.

Bullbustin' Inc. also produces various charity and private events. The Cody Snyder Charity Bullbustin' held in Calgary, Alberta, just before the Calgary Stampede, has raised over $3 million for local charities and has been a landmark event in the city since 1999.

Snyder has been a rodeo colour commentator on ESPN, TSN, Sportsnet and CBC covering rodeo events. Snyder has been known as the voice of the Calgary Stampede from 1997.

Snyder served as captain of the Canadian team for all four years of the PBR World Cup series (2007–2010) contested between riders from Australia, Brazil, Canada, Mexico, and the United States.

== Honours and awards ==
- 1983 Professional Rodeo Cowboys Association World Champion bull rider
- 1986 Canadian Professional Rodeo Association bull riding champion
- 1994 Awarded CPRA Cowboy of the Year (Note: Snyder was awarded the Cowboy of the Year title in 1994 and the PBR Ring of Honor in 2006 through votes by fellow world-champion bull riders.)
- 2002 Alberta Sports Hall of Fame inductee
- 2005 Canadian Pro Rodeo Hall of Fame inductee
- 2006 Professional Bull Riders Ring of Honor inductee
- 2023 Bull Riding Hall of Fame inductee
