= Rodeo clown =

Bull riding competition performer

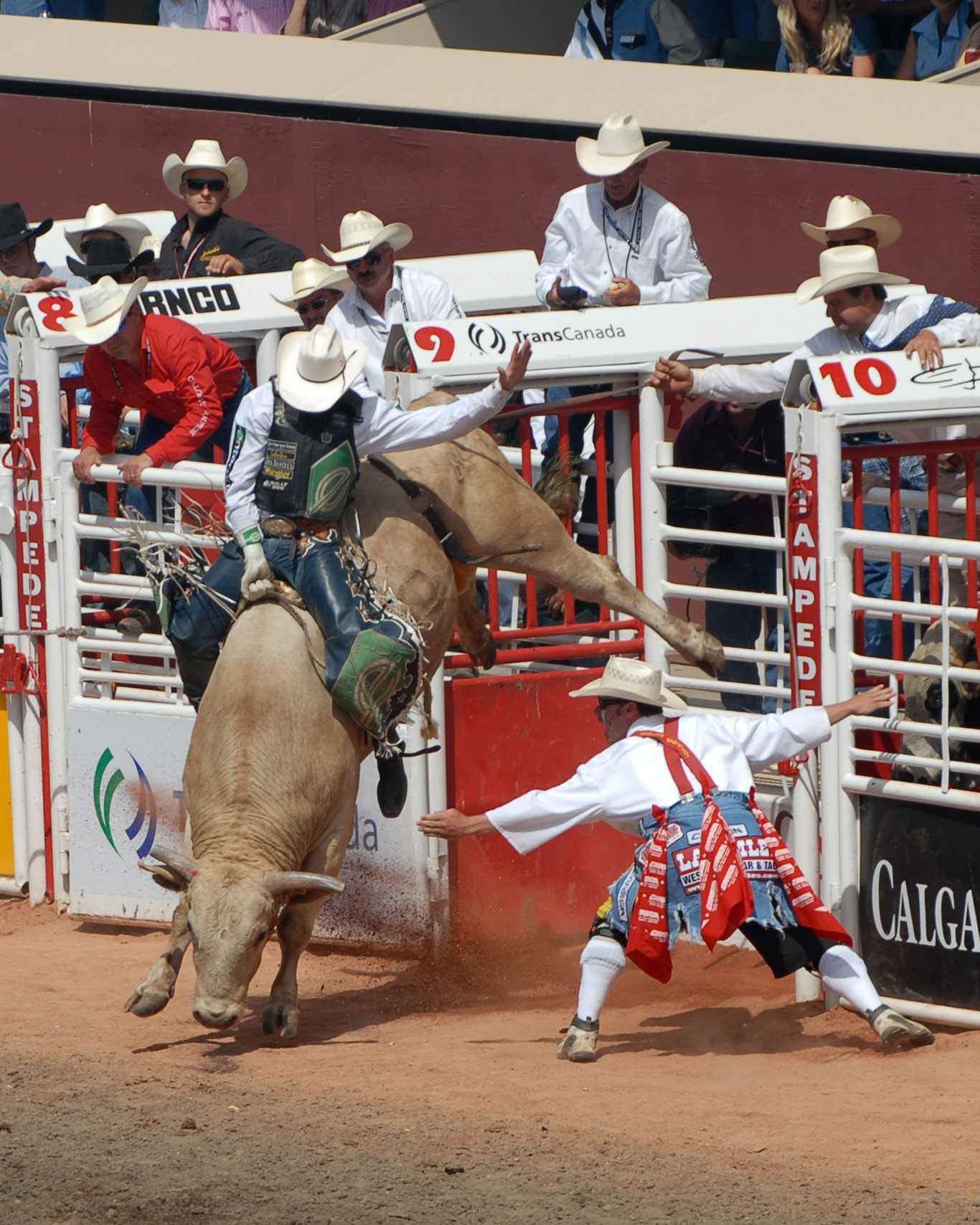
A rodeo bullfighter at work

A rodeo clown, bullfighter or rodeo protection athlete, is a rodeo performer who works in bull riding competitions. Originally, the rodeo clown was a single job combining "bullfighting" — the protection of riders thrown from the bull — with providing comic relief. Today, the job is split into two separate ones: bullfighters who protect the riders from the bull, and entertainers (barrelmen) who provide comic humor. However, in some parts of the world and at some small rodeos, the jobs of bull rider protection and comic remain combined.

== Tasks and skills ==
The primary job of the rodeo bullfighter is to protect a fallen rider from the bull by distracting the bull and providing an alternative target for the bull to attack, whether the rider has been bucked off or has jumped off the animal. These individuals expose themselves to great danger in order to protect the riders. To this end, they wear bright, loose-fitting clothes that are designed to tear away, with protective gear fitted underneath. Rodeo clowns require speed, agility, and the ability to anticipate a bull's next move. Working closely with very large, very powerful animals, rodeo clowns are often injured seriously, and, sometimes, fatally. Most rodeos feature a clown, and clowns have become crowd favorites.

In some venues, rodeo bullfighters still wear clown make-up and some may also provide traditional clowning entertainment for the crowd between rodeo events, often parodying aspects of cowboy culture. But most modern bullfighters no longer dress as clowns, though they still wear bright, loose-fitting clothing. At larger events in the United States, the job is split, a bullfighter (sometimes two or more) protects the riders from the bull, and a barrelman (sometimes one person, sometimes two) provides comic humor. Some barrelmen provide both comedy and support to bullfighters, but the job of a bullfighter is generally distinct from that of the comic.

== History ==
Rodeo clowns date to the beginnings of competitive rodeo in the early 20th century, when promoters hired cowboys to entertain the crowd between events or if the competition was delayed. These individuals began wearing oversized, baggy clothing and eventually developed more outlandish gear. When bull riding competition began to use ill-tempered Brahma bulls in the 1920s, the need for a person to distract the bull from fallen riders fell to the rodeo clown. The comedy aspect of clown work, as opposed to protection of rodeo athletes, began to disappear in some parts of the United States by the late 1970s.

The use of a barrel for protection began during the 1930s when a rodeo clown named Jasbo Fulkerson began to use a wooden barrel with a solid bottom. Wiley McCray is regarded historically as a pivotal figure in bullfighting and rodeo comedy acts, participating in many large events over many eras of rodeo. In 1995, Earl W. Bascom was honored at age 89 as the oldest living rodeo clown in the world. Bullfighting was reported as Wick Peth's profession in 1967..

In Australia, rodeo clowns were a part of rodeos and agricultural shows for many years. They were hired to entertain the spectators between events and to help manage the bullocks, steers or bulls in the arena. In the 1930s, with the introduction of aggressive Brahman bulls and Brahman crossbreds, the job became much more serious. In the late 20th century, acknowledging the great danger faced by the profession, the term bullfighter began to replace the name rodeo clown in formal use.

At the 2001 Professional Bull Riders (PBR) World Finals, bullfighter Rob Smets no longer wore his traditional, baggy clown outfit and began wearing a sport jersey and shorts that featured his sponsors' logos. This was the blueprint for future PBR bullfighter outfits as in 2003, all bullfighters in the organization stopped wearing traditional clown make-up and outfits, and traded them for sport jerseys and shorts with corporate sponsor logos. This was also the case for barrelmen in the PBR, but they retained their make-up. In subsequent years, many bullfighters in other organizations would also adopt sport jerseys and shorts, but many also kept wearing clown make-up. Some even combine make-up and baggies with jerseys. Frank Newsom, who had fought bulls in the Professional Rodeo Cowboys Association (PRCA) and Professional Bull Riders (PBR), including at each organization's respective world championship event (the National Finals Rodeo and PBR World Finals) was the last bullfighter to wear a baggy outfit and make-up at a televised PBR event, which was the 2004 Built Ford Tough Series (BFTS) event in Guthrie, Oklahoma. He was an alternate bullfighter at said event. Beginning the next year, he would don a sport jersey and shorts as an official member of the PBR elite series' bullfighting team, of which he was a member for several years until retiring at the conclusion of the 2022 PBR World Finals.

For several years, barrelmen at PBR events have no longer gone inside the barrel in the arena. As a result, they are now referred to as "arena entertainers" or simply "entertainers".

== Technique ==
The bullfighters enter the rodeo arena on foot, before the bull is released from the bucking chute. They stand on either side of the chute as the bull is released and work as a team to distract the bull and thus protect the rider and each other. Their role is particularly important when a rider has been injured, in which case the bullfighter interposes himself between the bull and the rider, or uses techniques such as running off at an angle, throwing a hat, or shouting, so that the injured rider can exit the ring.

Typically, at larger rodeos, bullfighters work in groups of as little as two, and as many as four. The barrelman uses a large, well-padded steel barrel that he can jump in and out of easily, and the barrel helps to protect him from the bull. In Australia, barrelmen generally do not use barrels.

A rodeo bullfighter’s job can be quite dangerous, as in this example of one being gored by a bucking bull.

All members of the protection team wear loose, baggy clothing. The comic may wear the most outlandish clothing in bright colors, which may include things like wearing an inflatable female costume, and uses noisy colorful props such as rubber chickens and exploding garbage cans.

Typically, the barrelman carries a microphone and heckles the rodeo announcer, the crowd and anyone else he recognizes. During the bull riding event, the barrelman supports the bullfighters, including taunting the bulls by calling them names and waving props at them, usually from within the safety of the barrel. Barrelmen may also tell jokes and use topical humor.

== Freestyle bullfighting ==
Bullfighting has grown in popularity, so that in addition to being a job in its own right, it is a competitive event at rodeos around the United States. When not working to protect bull riders, many rodeo bullfighters also have their own performances known as American freestyle bullfighting, or simply Freestyle bullfighting or American bullfighting. Instead of bucking bulls, fighting bulls are used in these events. They are turned into the arena and the bullfighter works with the animal, evaluated based upon the aptitude he displays in controlling and maneuvering the bull, precision in jumping the bull, contact with the bull, and handling of the barrel. Similar skills are sometimes displayed at traditional rodeos in intermission acts. A typical format is a 60- or 70-second encounter between bull and bullfighter, in which the bullfighter scores points for various maneuvers.

In contrast to the older sport of Spanish bullfighting, no harm is done to the bull in rodeo bullfighting. In some occasions, a bullfighter will draw the same bull numerous times during a season, which can help with score.

== Recognition ==
From 1981 through 2000, the Wrangler Bullfighting Tour held a series of several events at PRCA rodeos and at the end of the regular season, the top six contestants competed at the National Finals Rodeo (NFR) to determine the world champion bullfighter.

Since 2004, the PRCA has designated the Bullfighter of the Year award to its best bull rider protection athlete by a way of votes within the organization.

As of the 2020s, there are two organizations in the United States that specialize in freestyle bullfighting: Bullfighters Only (BFO) and Ultimate Bullfighters (UBF). There is also the Bulls, Bands & Barrels (BBB) tour, which features freestyle bullfighting as an event in addition to bull riding and barrel racing.

Schools exist to provide training for potential rodeo bullfighters.

== See also ==
- Rob Smets
- Jimmy Anderson
- Flint Rasmussen
- Earl W. Bascom
