= Larry Mahan =

American rodeo cowboy (1943-2023)

- Born: November 21, 1943; Salem, Oregon, U.S.
- Died: May 7, 2023 (aged 79); Valley View, Texas, U.S.
- Occupations: Rodeo cowboy; entrepreneur; color commentator; actor
- Years active: 1957–1977 (rodeo); 2003–2009
- Known for: Subject of The Great American Cowboy
- Awards: PRCA All-Around Champion (1966–1970, 1973)
- Honors: ProRodeo Hall of Fame (1979)

Larry Mahan (/ˈmeɪhæn/; November 21, 1943 – May 7, 2023) was an American professional rodeo cowboy. He won six all-around world championships and two bull riding world championships in the Rodeo Cowboys Association circuit at the National Finals Rodeo.

Mahan was the subject of the documentary The Great American Cowboy, which won the 1974 Academy Award for Best Documentary Feature Film. The ProRodeo Hall of Fame inducted him in 1979 in the all-around category. It also inducted him as a Legend of ProRodeo in 2010.

== Rodeo career ==
Larry Mahan was born on November 21, 1943, in Salem, Oregon. He began competing in professional rodeo at the age of 14. He competed in the Rodeo Cowboys Association (RCA) beginning in 1963. Said organization would later be renamed the Professional Rodeo Cowboys Association (PRCA) in 1975. He won the title of World All-Around Champion for five consecutive years from 1966 to 1970, and a sixth time in 1973. His 1973 comeback and competition with Phil Lyne was the subject of the documentary The Great American Cowboy, which won the 1974 Academy Award for Best Documentary Feature Film. In 1973, Mahan was also featured in the book Let 'Er Buck! by Douglas Kent Hall. He is pictured with the author on the book's back jacket.

In the RCA, he competed and regularly won in saddle bronc riding, bareback riding, and bull riding; he was the first to contest three National Final Rodeo events in one year. He was the bull riding world champion in 1965 1967. During the latter year, he won more than $50,000; the first to achieve that level in a single season. In the 1970 season, he earned more than $280,000. He had a tough decade in the 1970s, winning an all-around title in 1973, but with injuries sidelining him some of the time.

Mahan earned six all-around titles, but the last one was not consecutive. He quit riding bulls and bareback broncs in 1977, and rode saddle broncs in some choice events for a few more years before officially retiring from rodeo competition.

Mahan's consecutive all-around record of five titles was not surpassed until 1979 when Tom Ferguson won his sixth consecutive title. In 1994, Ty Murray broke Mahan's and Ferguson's record of six titles and tied Ferguson's record of having won six titles consecutively. In 1998, Murray won his seventh title, surpassing both of them and holding the record for all-around titles at seven titles. That's when they started calling Murray "King of the Cowboys." In 2010, Trevor Brazile won his eighth all-around title, surpassing them all. In 2018, Brazile won his 14th all-around title.

== Outside rodeo ==
Mahan entered the rodeo school market by running a few schools himself. He even had his own brand of Western clothing. After he retired from rodeo in 1977, he bought a ranch near Phoenix, Arizona.

=== Western wear entrepreneur ===
Mahan established the Larry Mahan Boot Collection, as well as a clothing line. He also licensed his name to various entities, including Justin Boots, Gensco, and others. Larry Mahan's Hat Collection has been available from the Milano Hat Company since 1984.

=== Musician ===
Larry Mahan is one of the title characters in the song Ramblin' Jack and Mahan by Guy Clark.

In 1976, he released an album on Warner Brothers entitled Larry Mahan, King of the Rodeo. Mahan said of his short-lived music career, "Couldn't sing a lick. I did a record ... It was a flop, but it was fun." Mahan and his group opened for Waylon Jennings at Red Rocks Amphitheatre. Mahan's later assessment of the experience was that "it became obvious that the crowd of 8,000 screaming fans were there to see Waylon, not me."

=== Actor ===
Mahan had a small part in the 1972 Steve Ihnat film The Honkers, which starred James Coburn and Slim Pickens. In 1975, he appeared in Sixpack Annie. He also co-starred in the 1995 TV movie The Good Old Boys directed by and starring Tommy Lee Jones and also featuring Sissy Spacek, Matt Damon, and Joaquin Jackson.

=== Color commentator ===
While as an active rodeo contestant and even after retirement, Mahan provided some color commentary for televised PRCA rodeos. In 2003, he briefly served as a color commentator during the 2003 season of the Professional Bull Riders Built Ford Tough Series on the Outdoor Life Network.

=== Television host ===
Mahan hosted RFD-TV's Equestrian Nation until 2009.

== Death ==
Mahan died on May 7, 2023, at age 79 at his home in Valley View, Texas, after a prolonged struggle with cancer.

== Rodeo honors ==
- 1966 Rodeo Hall of Fame of the National Cowboy & Western Heritage Museum
- 1972 For the 1971 Film/Television – Western Documentary – "Rodeo," Concepts Unlimited, Inc and Contemporary Films/McGraw Hill; Gaby Monet, Producer; Carroll Ballard, Director; Freckles Brown & Larry Mahan, Actors. Bronze Wrangler at the Western Heritage Awards of the National Cowboy & Western Heritage Museum
- 1974 Golden Plate Award of the American Academy of Achievement
- 1979 ProRodeo Hall of Fame
- 1985 Oregon Sports Hall of Fame
- 1998 Pendleton Round-Up and Happy Canyon Hall of Fame
- 1998 St. Paul Rodeo Hall of Fame
- 1998 PBR Ring of Honor
- 2001 Ellensburg Rodeo Hall of Fame
- 2002 Cheyenne Frontier Days Hall of Fame
- 2005 Texas Trail of Fame
- 2007 Texas Cowboy Hall of Fame
- 2007 Received the Ben Johnson Memorial Award of the National Cowboy & Western Heritage Museum
- 2010 ProRodeo Hall of Fame Legend of ProRodeo
- 2015 Bull Riding Hall of Fame
- 2017 Molalla Walk of Fame
- 2019 PBR Ty Murray Top Hand Award

== Cultural references ==
In the 2007 film No Country for Old Men, Josh Brolin's character asks for and purchases a pair of "Larry Mahans" (cowboy boots) at a western clothing store, and during a subsequent visit is asked by the clerk how his "Larrys are holding up".
