= Ty Murray =

American rodeo cowboy

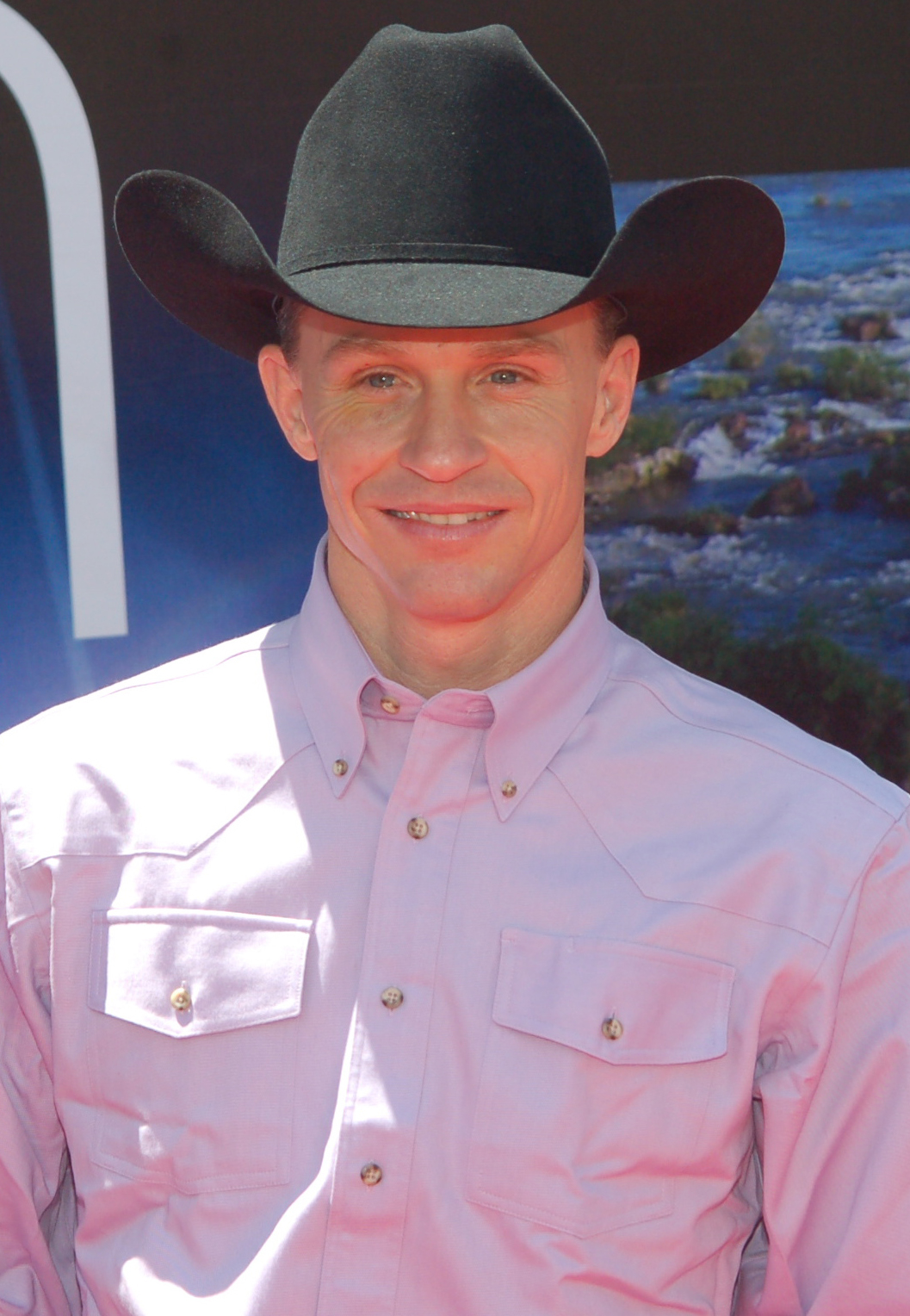
- Murray at the premiere for Earth in 2009

Personal information
- Nickname: Puddin'
- Born: Ty Monroe Murray; October 11, 1969 (age 57) Phoenix, Arizona, U.S.
- Height: 5 ft 8 in (1.73 m)
- Weight: 160 lb (73 kg)

Sport
- Sport: Rodeo
- Events: Bareback riding, saddle bronc riding and bull riding
- Turned pro: 1987
- Retired: 2002

Achievements and titles
- Highest world ranking: 7x PRCA All-Around World Champion; 2x PRCA Bull Riding World Champion

Ty Monroe Murray (born October 11, 1969), is an American former professional rodeo cowboy. He competed in the three "roughstock" events; bareback bronc riding, saddle bronc riding, and bull riding. He won nine world championships in the Professional Rodeo Cowboys Association (PRCA); seven in all-around (1989–1994 and 1998) and two in bull riding (1993 and 1998). He was also one of the co-founders and a board adviser of the Professional Bull Riders (PBR). From 2005 to 2020, he was also a regular color commentator for several televised PBR events.

In 2023, Murray was ranked No. 11 on the list of the top 30 bull riders in PBR history.

== Early life ==
Ty Murray was born on October 11, 1969, in Phoenix, Arizona, to Harold "Butch" Murray and Joy Murray (née Myers). He has two sisters, Kim and Kerri, both also involved in rodeo during their childhoods. His father competed in rodeos, broke colts for 30 years, and was the starter for The Downs in Albuquerque, New Mexico. His mother competed as a child in the National Little Britches Rodeo Association. She took first place in their bull riding competition. However, it was not long before the family moved to a ranch in Glendale, Arizona, that was around 10 miles from Phoenix.

At two years old, Murray's father put him on calves, but rode alongside and held him. When he started walking, he got spurs, and he spurred his mother's sewing machine cover to pieces. At eight years old, he helped his father break colts. At nine years old, he rode his first bull. That 1,800 pound brindle just loped around, so his father warned him it was not typical. Murray felt invincible back then. However, the second bull threw him and stepped on his jaw, breaking it. Murray figures he would have quit after that had his affection for the sport not been complete. At 12 years old, Murray rode his first bareback horse in a rodeo. It was the first time he had been somewhat scared riding livestock; he referred to it as "spooky."

At 12 years old, Murray purchased a mechanical bucking machine with money he saved doing chores. He joined the Deer Valley High School gymnastics team to improve his rodeo skills. Since the meets were on the weekends, though, he never actually competed in a meet.

Larry Mahan first paid attention to Murray when he was about 13 years old. Mahan, world champion rodeo competitor, was Murray's hero. Mahan noticed him at a Little Britches rodeo. When Mahan heard Murray was going to compete in all three riding events, that piqued his interest. He wanted to meet someone who was competing like he had done. Mahan called Murray to invite him to his place in Colorado Springs, Colorado. They spent that summer flying around the West in Mahan's plane participating in several different activities. Murray soon began a weightlifting program. That was when Murray started participating in gymnastics.

Later Murray was mentored by the world champion, who had won more National Finals Rodeo (NFR) first place "All Around Cowboy" championships than anyone in history. When Murray was in third grade, his teacher passed out a paper that asked students, "If you could do anything in your life, what would it be?" Murray immediately wrote out, "I want to beat Larry Mahan's record."

== Career ==
=== High school rodeo ===
In 1987, he won the Arizona National High School Rodeo Association all-around championship. He tied with Dennis Schmidt for the bareback riding championship. This helped Arizona win the team national title, which it had not won in 12 years. He competed in every roughstock event and in cutting. He also won the National High School Rodeo Association all-around championship.

=== College and 1988 PRCA season ===
In 1987, Murray enrolled in the fall semester of Odessa College, a two-year school in Odessa, Texas. The school's proximity to some nearby PRCA rodeos was one of the deciding factors. He joined the PRCA on his 18th birthday, and was set on trying for a world championship immediately. The fact that he could attend school and compete simultaneously was another deciding factor. He attended school and competed simultaneously in the National Intercollegiate Rodeo Association, and the PRCA. In Murray's first official year on the PRCA, he traveled with rodeo cowboy Cody Lambert, who rode bulls and saddle bronc. Before Murray, Lambert traveled with Tuff Hedeman, Jim Sharp, and Lane Frost. Now Lambert could travel with Murray for saddle bronc riding, then they met up with the other guys for bull riding. Murray spent the season gaining experience with Cody's help. When the season end was near, he was in the lead for Rookie of the Year. However, his riding was suffering some due to fatigue as he was not used to pro rodeo. At the Calgary Stampede, a bull named First Blood threw him headfirst into the dirt. Lambert told his uncle Butch he needed to rest. After some rest, Murray continued to enter all three roughstock events. In 1988, he was the PRCA Overall Rookie of the Year due to winning $45,977 in the three roughstock events, bull riding, bareback riding, and saddle bronc riding. He also won the individual Bareback Riding Rookie of the Year title. He did not earn enough money in a single event to qualify for the finals, the NFR in the PRCA.

=== 1989 PRCA season ===
In this year, Murray was in his second year at Odessa College. He exchanged the dorm for an apartment with Jim Sharp. Slightly older, Sharp was already a world champion in bull riding. Murray started the year competing in Fort Worth, Texas. He captured the saddle bronc title and finished second in bareback. His earnings of $4,062 were enough to win the all-around event, and enough to beat Dave Appleton, the previous year's all-around champ. He also earned a spot in the Dodge National Circuit Finals Rodeo.

Murray competed at the Reno Rodeo Championship at the end of June. Although he did not win any events, he tied third in the saddle bronc event and made it to the finals in bull riding. Out of 11 bulls, only 3 cowboys made rides. Murray was bucked off by a bull named Copenhagen Times in two seconds. Despite this, Murray earned $5,449, enough to win the all-around. Murray was reluctantly happy to win the all-around without winning any events. He was also frustrated at not scoring in the bull riding finals. Consistency won the all-around, but it was hard won.

By Labor Day, Murray was 2nd in the All-Around World Standings. He was $1,000 behind his uncle, Butch Myers. Then, two weeks, later, Murray was leading the standings. On September 19, Murray's earnings were $84,044; his uncle had $82,465, and Clay O'Brien Cooper had $76,967. Near the end of October, the race was looking close and time was running out before the NFR. But it was obvious Murray would qualify.

This time for the NFR, he qualified for the NFR in the bareback riding and the saddle bronc riding. He almost qualified for bull riding.

He drew a bareback mare named Kattle Kate. Kattle Kate was owned by Flying U Rodeo. Murray made a good ride, scoring a 78. He tied for sixth in the fifth round. Next up was Bad River from Harry Vold. Murray made a great ride on this saddle bronc, scoring a 77. In the ninth round, Murray scored 75 on a saddle bronc ride on Copenhagen Joe and finished fourth in the round. In the eighth round, he scored 74 on the bronc Skoal Exorcist. On the final round Sunday, Murray started with the bareback event. His draw was a horse named Rabbit. Rabbit was a Mesquite Championship Rodeo horse. He had a good ride, scoring 78. He finished that round in sixth place. That put him almost out of reach in the bareback average (which paid a large bonus). All that remained between him and the all-around title was a mare named Oil City Red. The mare's first four jumps were famous and hard to get through. But if one did manage them, they could get a good ride. Murray made it through and scored a 73; he thought probably not good enough. He made sixth place in the saddle bronc average for the finals. An official soon found Murray's parents to congratulate them on their son's win. That was the beginning of Murray's all-around world championships. He was also the youngest winner of the title.

He and his uncle Butch Myers were the only two cowboys that year who qualified in more than one event. Nephew and uncle had a friendly competition for the all-around that year. Myers had a $2,786 lead over Murray heading into the finals. Murray placed on 7 of his 20 horses, winning $58,031 in his first NFR. He bypassed Myers by $21,202. Murray became the youngest all-around champion that year. Previously, Jim Shoulders had held that position for winning at age 21 in 1949. Also, that year, Murray won the National Intercollegiate Rodeo Association's all-around, saddle bronc, and bull riding titles.

=== 1990 PRCA season ===
When the next season began, being a world champion, things were different for Murray. There were many demands on his time from promoters, clothing companies, and fans. There is significant pressure to repeat. Few cowboys have repeated as all-around champ in the 75 years preceding. However, Murray's personal philosophies kept him from feeling this additional pressure in his competition. He took each ride one at a time and ignored distractions.

About a month after Murray won his championship, he and Sharp moved out of Odessa into a place in Benbrook, Texas. It's a little south of Fort Worth. Not long after that, Murray received a sponsorship offer from well-known clothing company. He turned the offer down, which just was not done back then, ending the call with an instruction for them to contact his agent next time. Back then, rodeo cowboys did not have agents. Even 20 years after winning his six titles, Larry Mahan was still getting the standard deal Murray turned down. When Murray went for deals, he was selective. He also went outside rodeo, getting deals with companies such as Post, No Fear Sportswear, and other sportswear labels. His tactics paid off.

One of Murray's goals this season was to improve his bull riding, in order to qualify for the NFR in all 3 roughstock events. His first event that season was the National Western Stock Show in Denver, Colorado, where he won the all-around title. At January's end, he held the fifth spot in the World Standings and had a good lead in the all-around World Standings.

In Rapid City, South Dakota, Murray was matched with Mr. T. Mr. T is still considered one of the rankest bulls ever. At the time, he was the rankest bull, and most cowboys did not want to draw him. Mr. T was nasty and almost impossible to ride. He had only been ridden once before. Marty Staneart rode him at Cheyenne Frontier Days. He had dispatched 187 cowboys. Somehow Murray stayed on this bull and managed to stay in the middle of the bull for a qualified ride and get a score.

Murray continued to win all-around titles that season, at rodeos such as Colorado Springs, Phoenix, and the Houston Livestock Show and Rodeo. By May, Murray considered that all three of his events were at the same skill level. Then on May 19, 1990, at the Redding Rodeo in California, Murray had an incident. On a saddle bronc named Road Agent Murray rode well, scoring 72 points. As Murray was dismounting, his left foot hung in the stirrup for a second. Instantly, he was drawn underneath. He found himself facedown in the mud. The horse stepped on him and kicked him. Then as Murray tried to crawl away, he was kicked again. The hoof his right elbow. Murray ended up with stitches in his head, bruised ribs, and a broken elbow. He missed six weeks.

Murray was back to competition in July even though his elbow was in a brace. He competed at Reno Rodeo. He won the all-around and bronc riding titles. He qualified for the NFR again that season. He was fifth in the World Standings in bull riding. He was sixth in the World Standings in saddle bronc. He was seventh in the World Standings in bareback. Thus, he had qualified in all three roughstock events. Murray was the third cowboy to qualify for all three roughstock events in the NFR (and first in 17 years).

So it was back to the Thomas & Mack Center, Las Vegas, Nevada. In Round One, Murray tied for second in bull riding. He also tied for second in the bareback. In the Second Round, he and Lambert split first place in saddle bronc. Also in the Second Round, Murray placed fourth in bull riding. Murray continued to ride well in additional rounds. On Friday, December 7, in Round Eight, Murray had one of his best bareback rides of the year. He scored 84 points on Sippin' Velvet. He won the round with that score. When Murray finished that round, he had surpassed $200,000; having earned $203,552. He was the first cowboy to win over $200,000. He had two rounds to go.

The amount of earnings after Round 8 also assured him the all-around championship. It did not mean Murray would take it easy in the next two rounds however. In the next night, Round Nine, Murray has his next serious incident. Murray drew a saddle bronc of 1,200 pounds. A gelding named Bo Skoal. Murray could tell the horse was "off" that night. The horse flipped over backward after he got out of the gate. Murray was ready for him or he might have been under the horse when he fell. Still, he was not quite fast enough. His right knee got caught. The horse hit the knee and then rolled around on it. The pain was unbearable for Murray. It turned out the knee was not broken but was an intense bruise. He couldn't move it. Murray had to skip the rest of the Round Nine and Round Ten.

=== PBR Highlights ===
==== 1994 inaugural season ====
Murray competed on the inaugural tour of the PBR, the Bud Light Cup Series, which was in 1994. He also qualified for the inaugural PBR World Finals that year. The first world finals event was held at the MGM Grand Garden Arena in Las Vegas, Nevada in October. Only one record for Murray is found on ProBullStats Bull Riding Compendium for this year. Murray rode the bull Achey Breaky in round 2 of the finals for 81.5 points. The bull score is calculated to be 40.10 points, but may be slightly off. One notable out from 1994 saw Murray conquer the 1993 PRCA Bucking Bull of the Finals, Gunslinger, for 93 points in the short go of 1994's Bullnanza Nashville.

Adriano Moraes was the first world champion for the PBR. All of Murray's PBR competition took place on the Bud Light Cup Series, as it was the PBR's only tour that year.

==== Highlights from seasons 1995–2001 ====
The records from these earlier years are incomplete. There is no data for 1996. From the years 2000–2002, some data is missing from the PBR's records. Thus, buckoffs are unmarked and bull scores are calculated based on the average bull score and ride score.

===== Notable outs from 1995 =====
In January in Fort Worth, Texas, Murray almost made a qualified ride on 1997 PBR World Champion Bull 315 Panhandle Slim. He was bucked off in 7.60 seconds; the bull scored 44 points. Murray met up with this bull three more times. He bucked off the bull again in Albuquerque, New Mexico in March 1999. In October 1999, he rode the bull at the PBR World Finals in Las Vegas, Nevada, for 94 points; the bull was scored 46 points. In January 2001, in Bossier City, Louisiana, he rode the bull for 89 points; the bull was scored 44 points. In May 1995 in Charlotte, North Carolina, Murray got his shot at the famous 1995 PBR World Champion Bull and 1994–1995 PRCA Bucking Bull of the Year Bodacious. The Bull bucked him off in 1.70 seconds.

===== Notable outs from 1996 =====
In the summer, Murray rode 1996 PBR World Champion Bull 16 Babyface for 92 in Kansas City, Missouri. Later, he rode 79 Erkel for 91 points in Charlotte, North Carolina, to tie for the event win with Jim Sharp.

===== Notable outs from 1997 =====
This year, Murray competed in only five PBR Bud Light Cup events; in the second event of the year in St. Louis, Missouri, Murray landed on his right elbow when getting bucked off of a bull named Bar Fly, which ended up dislocating his shoulder and putting him out of competition for 7 months. Though he returned to action in the fall of 1997 and finished 7th in the final event, Bullnanza Reno, he did not earn enough money to qualify for the 1997 PBR Finals.

===== Notable outs from 1998 =====
In October, Murray rode Little Hopper for 86.50 points while the bull was scored 42.58 points. Later in October, Murray drew the bull Hollywood in the PBR World Finals in Las Vegas, but was bucked off. In May 1999 in Richmond, Virginia and September 2000 in Reno, Nevada, he was again bucked off the bull. In January 2001, he finally got a qualified ride on the bull for the very high score of 93 points in Greensboro, North Carolina; the bull scored 45.50 points. In December 1998 in Salt Lake City, Utah, Murray rode Kushma for 88.50 points; the bull scored 43.50 points.

====== National Finals Rodeo ======
In 1998, the PRCA's National Finals Rodeo was held in December at the Thomas & Mack Center in Las Vegas, Nevada, which continues to be where it is held. Murray qualified for the NFR in 1998 and had a run of many qualified, high point rides that year. He rode 403 Dewalt Power for 83 points while the bull scored 40.50 points. He rode 409 Orleans for 81 points and the bull scored 40 points. He rode 65 Hells Bells for 81 points; the bull scored 39.50 points. He rode −08 Riptide for 84 points while the bull scored 41 points. He rode 236 Slingshot for 83 points; the bull scored 40 points. Last, he rode F6 Hard Copy Skoal for 79 points and the bull scored 43.50 points.

===== Notable outs from 1999 =====
Murray's most notable achievement in the PBR took place this year. He won the PBR World Finals Event at the PBR World Finals in October in Las Vegas, Nevada at the Thomas & Mack Center.

In January 1999 in Worcester, Massachusetts, Murray rode Lock & Load for 87 points; the bull scored 42.50 points. In March in Albuquerque, New Mexico, he rode Lock & Load for 89.50 points; the bull scored 44 points. In October 1999 in Columbus, Ohio, he rode the bull yet again for 87.50 points; the bull scored 43 points.

In January, Murray rode Bocephus in Greensboro, North Carolina for 87.50 points while the bull scored 43.00 points. He also made a qualified ride on this bull in June in Nashville, Tennessee for 84 points and the bull scored 41 points. In February in Guthrie, Oklahoma, Murray rode Orleans for a score of 82 points while the bull scored 40 points. In March, Murray bucked off 1998 PBR World Champion Bull Moody Blues in Odessa, Texas. He also bucked off Moody Blues in Guthrie, Oklahoma in February 2001; the bull scored 45 bull points. In September, in Reno, Nevada, Murray rode Copenhagen Zandy for a very high score of 95 points; the bull scored 46.50 points. In October in Columbus, Ohio, Murray rode 5 Barracuda for 90.50 points to win the event, while the bull was scored 44.50 points. Also in October, Murray rode Palace Station Express for 93.50 points while the bull scored 46.00 points. He also rode the same bull in January 2000 in Greensboro, North Carolina for 91 points and the bull scored 45.00 points.

====== PBR World Finals ======
At the PBR World Finals, Murray successfully rode all of his bulls. The finals took place in October in Las Vegas, Nevada. He rode 48 Tequila for 87.50 points; the bull scored 43 points. He rode Vindicator for 90.50 points and the bull scored 44.50 points. Then, he rode the PRCA 1996 Bucking Bull of the Year Red Wolf for an extremely high score of 95.50; the bull scored high as well with 47 points. He also rode Red Wolf in June 1998 in Charlotte, North Carolina for 93.50 points. He also bucked off Red Wolf in February 2000 in Guthrie, Oklahoma while Red Wolf scored 45 points. Another notable bull that Murray rode at the finals was three-time PBR World Champion Bull (2002–2004) Little Yellow Jacket. Murray scored 90.50 points on the champion bull. The bull scored 45 points. Later, in September 2001, he would buck off the bull in Baltimore, Maryland; the bull would score 46 points. Last, in the championship round of the 1999 PBR World Finals, he rode Panhandle Slim for 94 points and won the event; the bull scored 46 points.

===== Notable outs from 2000 =====
In January in Tampa, Florida, Murray rode 27 Cochise for 87 points; the bull score was 43 points. In March in Albuquerque, New Mexico, Murray bucked off 441 Blueberry Wine; the bull scored 45 points. Then, in February 2001, in St. Louis, Missouri, he scored very high with 93.50 points and the bull scored 46 points. In April 2001, in New Orleans, Louisiana, he bucked off Blueberry Wine while the bull scored 43.50 bull points. In April in Uniondale, New York, Murray bucked off Clayton's Pet; the bull scored 45.50 points. Then, in March 2001, in Cleveland Ohio, he scored 92.50 points and the bull scored 46 points. In May, Murray rode Hercules for 89 points to win the event in Bakersfield, California; the bull score was 43.50 points.

In October in Columbus, Ohio, Murray made a qualified ride on 5 Jersey Joe for 87 points; the bull scored 42.50 points. He also made a qualified ride on him in February 2001 in Anaheim, California for 93.50 points; the bull scored 46 points.

====== PBR World Finals ======
At the PBR World Finals in 2000, Murray bucked off all but one of his bulls. The finals took place in October in Las Vegas, Nevada. First, he attempted 150 Bell Dinger and bucked off; the bull scored 43.50 points. Then, he tried 76 Law Dog and bucked off while the bull scored 43.50 bull points. After that came 75 Ugly Buck and he bucked off while the bull scored 44.50 bull points. Then, he bucked off J3 El Nino and the bull scored 44.50 bull points. Last, he gained a qualified ride off 695 Mighty Whitely for 89.50 points; the bull scored 44 bull points.

===== Notable outs from 2001 =====
In January in Bossier City, Louisiana, Murray made a qualified ride on 77 Coyote Ugly for 90.50 points; the bull scored 45 points. In February in St. Louis, Missouri, during the short-go, Murray became the first rider to ever make the whistle aboard 441 Blueberry Wine, earning him a score of 93.50 points; the bull earned a score of 46.00. Also in February, Murray rode Jersey Joe for 93.50 points to win the event in Anaheim, California; the bull scored 46 points. In March in Colorado Springs, Colorado, he got a shot at 1999 PBR World Champion Bull Promise Land. The bull threw him off and earned 46.50 points. In April in Nampa, Idaho, he rode Dirt Dobber for 90.50 points; the bull scored 44.50 points. He won the event in Nampa after riding Psycho for 87.50 points in the short-go, but landed on his left elbow and dislocated his shoulder at the end of the ride, causing him to miss the next two events. He came back to ride in Nashville, Tennessee, where he rode Bone Collector for 92 points, while the bull scored 44 points. In the final event of the year in Columbus, Ohio, that October, Murray again rode Coyote Ugly, this time for 92.50 points, winning his third event of the year; the bull scored 46 points.

====== PBR World Finals ======
The PBR World Finals were held in October in Las Vegas, Nevada. Like the previous year's world finals, Murray bucked off all but one of his bulls. First, he bucked off J3 El Nino and the bull scored 43.76 points. Then, Murray gained a qualified ride from K7 Q Ball of 90.50 points; the bull scored 44.76 points. After that, Murray bucked off 161 Shorty; the bull scored 44 points. Last, he bucked off 2 Jack the Ripper while the bull scored 44.26 points.

===== Notable outs from 2002 =====
In January in Bossier City, Louisiana, Murray made a qualified ride on Fresh Country for 86.50 points while the bull earned 44.75 points. Also in January, Murray made a qualified ride on Smokin' Smurf in Greensboro, North Carolina for 90.50 points. The bull earned 44.50 points. Again in January, in Greensboro, Murray earned a qualified ride on Perfect Storm for 95 points; the bull earned 47 points. He had earlier bucked off the bull in August 2001 in Oklahoma City, Oklahoma. In February in Guthrie, Oklahoma, he made a qualified ride on Starbucks for 89 points; the bull earned 44.00 points. Also in February in Guthrie, he made a qualified ride on 6 Lefty for 89.50 points; the bull scored 44.00 points. In March in Albuquerque, New Mexico, Murray had a shot at future Brand of Honor bull Mossy Oak Mudslinger. The bull bucked him off and earned 47 points. Murray's final professional ride happened in round 1 of the 2002 NILE Bull Riders Invitational in Billings, Montana, where he bucked off a bull named Mooch. While recovering from a neck strain sustained in Billings, Murray officially announced his retirement from bull riding.

== Other endeavors ==
In November 1999, Murray made a cameo appearance in an episode of Walker, Texas Ranger in Season 8, Episode 8, titled "Widow Maker." The star, Chuck Norris, discovered after the show that Murray practiced a martial art. True to form, it was due to Murray being one not to "toot his own horn." Murray has credited the martial art of Nippon Kempo as aiding him in his rodeo skills.

In 2006, Murray was featured in the Miller Lite "Man Laws" series of commercials with movie star Burt Reynolds. Murray is currently a commentator for the PBR on CBS.

In 2007 Murray, along with his wife Jewel, appeared in the ABC reality television series Fast Cars and Superstars: The Gillette Young Guns Celebrity Race, featuring a dozen celebrities in a stock car racing competition. In the first round of competition, Murray matched up against skateboarder Tony Hawk and actress Krista Allen. John Elway won the series in the final match. In the summer of that same year, CMT televised Ty Murray's Celebrity Bull Riding Challenge. Murray attempted to teach nine celebrities how to ride a bull, survive a fall, and compete at one major PBR event. In January 2008 he appeared as himself in an episode of CSI.

On February 8, 2009, it was announced that both Murray and Jewel would be contestants on the eighth season of Dancing with the Stars, signifying the first time a husband and wife appeared as contestants on the show in the same season; however, Jewel had to withdraw from the competition due to an injury sustained during pre-season practice. Murray was partnered with new Dancing with the Stars professional dancer Chelsie Hightower. Murray was eliminated in the tenth week semifinals. Also in 2009, Murray and Jewel appeared on the HGTV Celebrity Holiday Homes special.

In January 2010 Murray and Jewel appeared on the ABC reality series Extreme Makeover: Home Edition. On February 22, 2010, Murray was co-host of WWE Raw on USA Network with Jewel where they had a bull riding competition for the WWE Divas.

== Personal life ==
Murray has been married twice. The first was the singer Jewel, who he married in 2008; they divorced in 2014. The second is Paige Duke, who he married in 2017.

=== Jewel ===
In 1999, Murray met singer/songwriter Jewel at the National Western Stock Show and Rodeo in Denver, Colorado. It was just sheer chance that Ty was the one who got her tickets to the sold-out event through a mutual acquaintance. Her full name is Jewel Kilcher. She is the daughter of Atz Kilcher, an Alaskan all-around cowboy, so she grew up riding horses and competing in local rodeos. She and Ty conducted their relationship by telephone for the first nine months, while they were on the road touring separately.

When their relationship became serious enough, Jewel moved into Ty's ranch in Stephenville, Texas. As Ty got to know her, he discovered that her ranching background was much stronger than he and his buddies realized. On a pack trip, they discovered just how tough she was. She grew up in a house with no amenities, no heat, no electricity, and no running water, with an outhouse, so she was right at home in the cabin he had built on his ranch that similarly outfitted. Likewise, Jewel brought Ty into her music world; they co-wrote the song "Till We Run Out of Road" together one night. The song is featured on her This Way album. The song is about Murray and his former traveling partner and mentor, Cody Lambert, who is now the livestock director of the PBR. It discusses how he misses his family. There's also a piece that discusses the late hall of famer Lewis Feild, who rode out of the limelight as Murray rode in. Jewel also mentioned him, though not by name, in her song "Stephenville, TX" which is on her Goodbye Alice in Wonderland album. She appears with him in one of the "Man Law" commercials.

On August 7, 2008, Murray and Jewel eloped to the Bahamas. Murray, 38, and Kilcher, 34, had been together for a decade when they decided to get married. There was no previous engagement announcement. "I dreamt about this day since I was a little girl on a ranch in Alaska," Jewel said. "It was relaxed and romantic. I wore a traditional wedding gown and diamonds, and he wore jeans and a button-down shirt. Ty's definitely my perfect prince."

On Monday evening, July 11, 2011, Jewel gave birth to a son. Jewel was 36 years old at the time. The baby boy weighed 7 pounds, 6 ounces. Jewel and her husband had spent two years trying to conceive.

On July 2, 2014, Jewel announced on her blog that she and her husband Ty Murray had decided to get a divorce. She further elaborated that they had been engaged in a difficult but thoughtful separation. Jewel was age 40, while Murray was age 44. Their son turned three a week after the announcement. Jewel also confirmed that the couple would raise their son together.

=== Paige Duke ===
In December, Paige Duke, an ERA reporter at the time, was attending an after-party for the 2014 NFR when she saw Murray. She immediately thought of her boss, the president of RIDE TV, in terms of getting Murray's email address for him. Right after she procured Murray's email address, he left the party. Murray got her contact information the next day, and they went for dinner. From then on they were inseparable and in time moved in together at Murray's ranch in Stephenville, Texas.

Early in 2016, Murray took Duke on a long hike to Hope Lake, Colorado, to an altitude of 12,000 feet above sea level. It was a three mile trip. Duke shared that she had wanted to get married on a mountaintop. Murray and her mother realized that was logistically impossible. So Murray proposed to her on one instead. They planned their wedding for September. Duke had selected a natural spring in North Carolina to hold the wedding, which was actually an old rock quarry. The plan was for Murray's father and son to be his best men. Engagement details were available on Paige's Facebook page.

On September 30, 2017, Murray married Duke in Mooresville, North Carolina. Duke was born and raised in Lancaster, South Carolina. They were married at The Quarry at Carrigan Farms in Mooresville. Duke wore a white lace wedding gown, and Murray wore denim, a vest, and black cowboy hat. Murray's son wore an outfit that matched his father's. On September 24, 2018, Murray and Duke welcomed their first child together, a daughter.

== Honors ==
- 1988 Cowboy Capital Walk of Fame
- 1989 Rodeo Hall of Fame of the National Cowboy and Western Heritage Museum
- 1990 Calgary Stampede Guy Weadick Award
- 1999 Texas Sports Hall of Fame
- 2000 ProRodeo Hall of Fame
- 2002 Texas Cowboy Hall of Fame
- 2002 PBR Ring of Honor
- 2011 Arizona Sports Hall of Fame
- 2013 California Rodeo Salinas Hall of Fame
- 2015 Cheyenne Frontier Days Hall of Fame
- 2016 New Mexico Sports Hall of Fame
- 2016 Texas Rodeo Cowboy Hall of Fame
- 2018 Bull Riding Hall of Fame
- 2018 The PBR named a new award after Murray, the Ty Murray Top Hand Award
- 2023 No. 11 on the list of the top 30 bull riders in PBR history
- 2026 RodeoHouston Hall of Fame
