= ProRodeo Hall of Fame =

- Established: 1979
- Location: 101 Pro Rodeo Drive; Colorado Springs, Colorado
- Coordinates: 38°54′46″N 104°49′27″W
- Type: Hall of fame
- Website: prorodeohalloffame/ ProRodeo

The ProRodeo Hall of Fame and Museum of the American Cowboy was opened in August 1979 as a museum designed to "preserve the legacy of the cowboy contests, the heritage and culture of those original competitions, and the champions of the past, present and future". It is located in Colorado Springs, Colorado, and only inducts Professional Rodeo Cowboys Association (PRCA) and Women's Professional Rodeo Association (WPRA) members. It is the "only museum in the world devoted exclusively to the sport of professional rodeo".

== Inductees ==
Since the Hall's opening in 1979, 294 people, 38 livestock, and 32 rodeo committees have been inducted. More than 100 individuals are nominated each year, but only a few are selected. For a complete list of inductees, see List of ProRodeo Hall of Fame inductees. Notable inductees include:

=== Humans ===
- Jim Shoulders, won 16 world championships
- Chris LeDoux, 1970s professional rodeo cowboy and country music star, won a bareback riding world championship
- Ty Murray, seven-time all-around world champion, two-time bull riding world champion
- Tuff Hedeman, three-time bull riding world champion
- Charlie Sampson, first African-American world champion rodeo cowboy
- Larry Mahan, six-time all-around world champion
- Roy Cooper, won six tie-down roping world championships
- Charmayne James, was an 11-time WPRA world champion barrel racer and seven-time NFR barrel racing average champion
- Slim Pickens, actor/rodeo clown
- Ben Johnson, steer roper/Oscar-winning actor
- Lane Frost, 1987 world champion bull rider, won seven-match Challenge of the Champions with bull Red Rock
- Casey Tibbs, saddle bronc rider/actor
- Don Gay, eight-time bull riding world champion
- Lewis Feild, three-time all-around world champion, two-time bareback riding world champion
- Fred Whitfield, eight-time tie-down roping world champion
- Trevor Brazile, won 26 world championships, the most of any PRCA contestant
- Jake McClure, known for his fast and tight lassos in calf roping. 1930 world champion.

=== Horses ===
- Steamboat, a gelding bronc, was inducted 1979; he is the model of the Wyoming state trademark, Bucking Horse and Rider, with the rider having been Clayton Danks, a Nebraska native who died in 1970 in Thermopolis, Wyoming
- Scamper, barrel racing, was inducted in 1996
- Star Plaudit "Red", barrel racing, won two world championships in a single season
- Midnight, a saddle bronc, was inducted in 1979
- Gray Wolf, sire, many of the best bucking horses today descend from Gray Wolf, inducted in 2016
- War Paint, a saddle bronc, was three-time bucking horse of the year, and inducted in 2011
- Descent, a saddle bronc, despite an injury at the beginning of the 1970s, returned to win his fifth and sixth bucking horse of the year award, and was inducted in 1979
- Scottie, steer wrestling, chestnut gelding, was able to take three cowboys to four world championships. Many liked him because he did not tire easily, enabling multiple cowboys to show him in quick succession

=== Bulls ===
- Skoal Pacific Bell, bull riding, only ridden five times in 150 outs, he also was the only three-time PRCA world champion bull in history, and was inducted in 2007
- Bodacious, bull riding, was one of two bulls to win the PBR and PRCA world champion and the inaugural champion bull of the PBR, inducted in 1999
- Crooked Nose, was the only fighting bull inducted, loved by fans and dreaded by bullfighters, and inducted in 1990
- Red Rock, unridden in 309 outs in his pro rodeo career (though he was ridden by Lane Frost in 1988, it was not actually a PRCA-sanctioned event), inducted in 1990
- Old Spec, ridden seven times in 350 outs, was inducted in 1979
- Oscar, in 300 outs, only eight riders rode him, including Don Gay three times (twice he was ridden for 97 points), he then became a legend in breeding. In fact, the renowned Bushwacker and many other great bulls came from Oscar. He was also featured in the Disney documentary film, The Great American Cowboy, and was inducted in 1979
- Tornado, bucking off 220 cowboys before being ridden by Freckles Brown, was inducted in 1979

== Pioneer Award ==
- Earl W. Bascom, recipient of the Pioneer Award 2016, was a rodeo-equipment inventor, world record time holder, actor, and artist/sculptor.

== See also ==
- List of Professional Rodeo Cowboys Association Champions
- List of ProRodeo Hall of Fame inductees
- Professional Rodeo Cowboys Association
- Women's Professional Rodeo Association
- National Rodeo Hall of Fame
- Canadian Pro Rodeo Hall of Fame
