= Louis Brooks (rodeo cowboy) =

American rodeo cowboy

Louis Lee Brooks (December 9, 1916 – August 6, 1983) was an American rodeo cowboy who competed in Rodeo Association of America (RAA) events in the 1940s. During a brief career, Brooks was a two-time All-Around Cowboy champion, winning the honor in consecutive years in 1943 and 1944. In addition, he won four season discipline championships. After his retirement following his second All-Around title, he went into ranching. Brooks was inducted into the ProRodeo Hall of Fame in 1991.

== Biography ==
Born in Fletcher, Oklahoma, on December 9, 1916, Brooks was raised in Washington County. At the age of 2, Brooks' father died; his grandparents raised him. He worked on local ranches during his early years, and at one point spent time in New Mexico. Brooks left high school to embark on a ranching career, and entered a rodeo for the first time when he was 20 years old.

Around 1940, Brooks was actively participating professionally in rodeo events, which were under the organization of the RAA. In 1942, Brooks led the RAA in season earnings in the bareback riding discipline. His winnings of $1,925 were $37 higher than the number-two bareback rider of that year, Hank Mills, and were enough for him to claim his first discipline championship. In all disciplines, Brooks earned $5,757 that year, finishing fifth in the All-Around Cowboy standings. Early in his career, he often participated in calf roping, along with the riding events. Later, he dropped calf roping events from his schedule to focus on the riding disciplines, and said that after this decision, his "bareback and saddle bronc riding improved 40 percent in 30 days."

The season-long performances of Brooks in 1943 earned him the All-Around Cowboy championship of the RAA. His overall earnings of $6,924 were more than $1,400 greater than the second-place cowboy, Homer Pettigrew. In addition, Brooks claimed the 1943 saddle bronc riding title, with $4,571 of his earnings in that field. Entering the 1944 rodeo season, Brooks had developed a heart condition and, according to his wife, had been told that he would have to change careers if he still wanted to be alive on his 30th birthday. Brooks told his wife that he would quit competing in rodeo if he claimed a second straight All-Around Cowboy title. With $11,064 in earnings, more than $800 ahead of second place Gene Rambo, he did repeat as the RAA's All-Around Cowboy champion, becoming the first cowboy ever to do so. Of that total, $4,802 came in saddle bronc riding, which was enough for Brooks to win the season title in that field for the second consecutive year. In addition, Brooks' $3,852 of bareback riding earnings gave him that discipline's season championship; that amount was $1,500 more than Bill Linderman, the runner-up, made for the year. The two discipline titles and All-Around honors gave Brooks a "triple crown" for the season.

Brooks did retire from competition after 1944, but served as the Rodeo Cowboys Association's vice president in 1945. He became a rancher and relocated to Texas, where he and his family helped to grow thoroughbreds, quarter horses, and cattle. On August 6, 1983, Brooks died of cancer in Stephenville, Texas; he was 66 years old. He was buried in Nolan County, at Brooks Ranch Cemetery. Brooks was inducted into the National Cowboy & Western Heritage Museum's Rodeo Hall of Fame in 1955, and the ProRodeo Hall of Fame in 1991. His championships are recognized by the modern Professional Rodeo Cowboys Association.
