= Pete Knight (rodeo) =

Canadian rodeo performer (1903–1937)

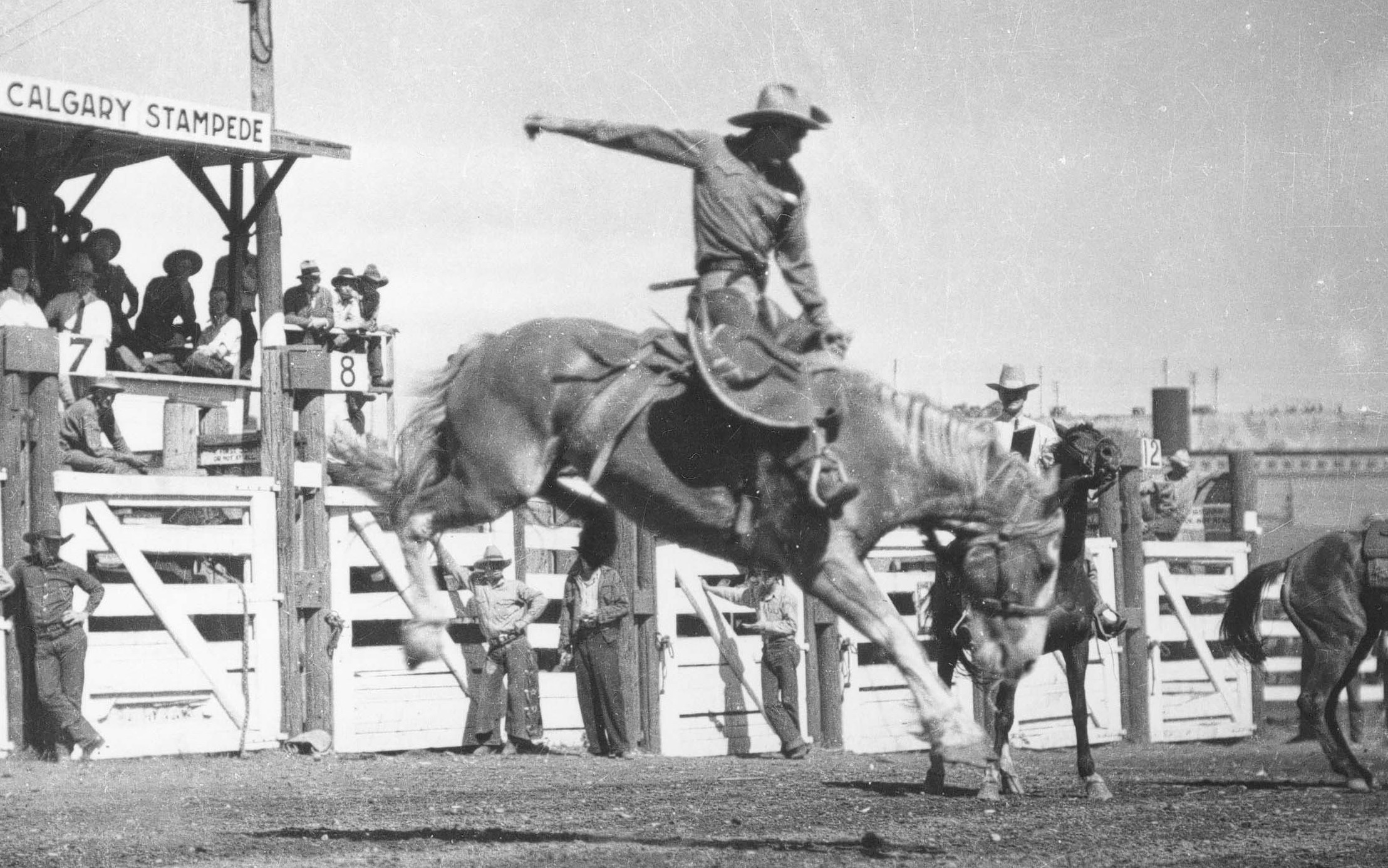
- Pete Knight at the 1935 Calgary Stampede, riding Silver King
- Born: May 5, 1903; Philadelphia, Pennsylvania, US
- Died: May 23, 1937 (aged 34); Hayward, California, US
- Occupations: Bronc rider, rodeo performer
- Years active: 1910s–1937
- Spouse: Ida Lee Avant (m. 1932)
- Children: 1 daughter

Charles Peter Knight (May 5, 1903 – May 23, 1937) was a Canadian and World Champion rodeo bronc rider. Knight was the acclaimed "King of the Cowboys" of the 1930s, and held the Rodeo Association of America title "World Champion Bronc Rider" for 1932, 1933, 1935, and 1936. The Rodeo Hall of Fame in the National Cowboy and Western Heritage Museum inducted Knight in 1958. The Ellensburg Rodeo Hall of Fame inducted him in 1998. The ProRodeo Hall of Fame in Colorado Springs, Colorado, inducted Knight in the Saddle Bronc Riding category when it opened its doors in 1979.

== Early life ==
Knight was born in Philadelphia, Pennsylvania on May 5, 1903, the son of an English father and Irish mother. The family moved to Stroud, Oklahoma in 1906, then Crossfield, Alberta in 1914 where they farmed. He became involved in nearby local rodeo events in the late 1910s.

== Bronc riding career ==
Knight won second in a bucking contest a few months after beginning training in 1918. Calgary Stampede founder Guy Weadick invited him to compete at the Stampede, which he did in 1924, winning second place in the Canadian Bucking Horse Championship event by 1/10th of a point. He toured with the Alberta Stampede Company, riding Midnight for the first time in October 1926 in Montreal. He won the 1927 Canadian and North American Open bucking championships and was awarded the Prince of Wales' Cup. At the 1930 Calgary Stampede, Knight won the Canadian Championship Bucking event for the second time, and weeks later, won the 1930 bucking event at the Cheyenne Frontier Days Rodeo. In 1931, Knight won the World Series Rodeo bucking event held in Madison Square Garden, New York City, and was chosen to compete against three other riders (the bucking event winners of the 1931 Rodeos at Calgary, Pendleton, Oregon, and Cheyenne) for the Jack Dempsey Trophy, which Knight won at Reno, Nevada in the Ride of Champions event held in June 1932. He went on to win the bucking event at the 1932 Pendleton Round-Up in Pendleton, Oregon. He married Ida Lee (Babe) Avant in that same year, at Hot Springs, Arkansas.

Knight entered the Calgary Stampede in 1933, again winning both the North American Open Bucking Championship and the Canadian Championship Bucking event, and was presented with the Prince of Wales' Cup for perpetuity. Later in 1933, Knight won the bucking event held at the World's Fair Rodeo in Chicago. Later that year, Wilf Carter recorded "Pete Knight, The King of the Cowboys." The same year, Knight performed screen tests and rode bucking horses in movies for Tom Mix at Los Angeles.

In 1934, Knight was invited to ride in England with the Tex Austin Rodeo Troupe. Later in 1934, Knight was invited to Melbourne, Australia, where he rode in the Stewart McColl pageant with fellow rider Yakima Canutt. The Rodeo Association of America (RAA) named Knight the World Champion Bronc Rider for 1932, 1933, 1935, and 1936. At the Rodeo held in Boston Gardens in 1936, Knight helped organize the Cowboy strike, becoming a founding member of the Cowboys Turtle Association (CTA) in 1936.

On May 23, 1937, Knight was trampled to death by a horse called "Duster", at the Hayward Rodeo in California. He was buried at Lone Tree Cemetery in Fairview near Hayward; his remains were later reinterred in 1960 at the Greenwood cemetery in Hot Springs, Arkansas. Knight's cups, trophies, saddles and buckles became a permanent fixture at the National Cowboy and Western Heritage Museum in Oklahoma City, Oklahoma, US. In his hometown of Crossfield, Alberta, the town named its arena in honor of Pete Knight, and holds an annual "Pete Knight Days Rodeo".

== Honors ==
- Cowboy Country Television Trailblazers
- 1998 Ellensburg Rodeo Hall of Fame
- 1981 Canadian Pro Rodeo Hall of Fame
- 1980 Alberta Sports Hall of Fame
- 1979 ProRodeo Hall of Fame
- 1971 Pendleton Round-Up and Happy Canyon Hall of Fame
- 1958 Rodeo Hall of Fame - National Cowboy and Western Heritage Museum
