= Florence Randolph =

Florence Randolph may refer to:

- Florence Hughes Randolph (1898–1971), American rodeo performer
- Florence Spearing Randolph (1866–1951), American minister and suffragist
