= Nancy Sheppard =

American trick rider (1929–2026)

Nancy Sheppard (December 29, 1929 – April 8, 2026) was an American ProRodeo Hall of Fame trick rider and trick roper who was inducted in 2003.

== Background ==
Nancy Sheppard was born on December 29, 1929, on a ranch in Fort Worth, Texas. Sheppard was descended from a pioneer family in ranching, who often attended the rodeo with her father as a child. Her father was a professional roper, who was a member of the Cowboys' Turtle Association (now known as the Professional Rodeo Cowboys Association (PRCA). As a child, Sheppard's mother had shown horses in the Fort Worth Coliseum. Sheppard made her first rodeo appearance at the Hayward, California, rodeo as a trick rider and roper at 9 years old. She performed at the Pendleton Round-Up in Pendleton, Oregon when she was 11 years old. She was trick riding at Madison Square Garden in New York City when she was 17 years old. Sheppard married Lynn Sheppard in 1948, and they had one son.

Sheppard died at her home in Globe, Arizona, on April 8, 2026, at the age of 96.

== Career ==
Sheppard performed professionally for 22 years at rodeos all around the country. She worked for many well-known stock contractors, such as Harry Knight, Christensen Brothers, Leo Cremer, and Everett Colburn. In her time, she was the only woman who could stand on a running horse while spinning two ropes. Traveling around the country enabled her to do charity work on the side. She would visit local hospitals where she could entertain patients, particularly children. In the 1950s, she filled the position of contract acts representation to the Rodeo Cowboys Association (the name of the organization after the Cowboy Turtles' Association but prior to the PRCA).

Sheppard performed at the majority of the major rodeos around the country. She began her career in 1939. In 1961, she retired from performing, in order to devote more time to ranching and family. After her retirement, she made special appearances performing trick roping in the Macy's Thanksgiving Parade as well as for clothing designer Giorgio Armani in Italy. For these roles, she always took them seriously, carrying her ropes and attired in her full Western garb.

== Honors ==
- 1991 National Cowgirl Museum and Hall of Fame
- 1996 Rodeo Hall of Fame of the National Cowboy & Western Heritage Museum
- 2003 ProRodeo Hall of Fame
