= Florence Hughes Randolph =

American trick rider

Florence Hughes Randolph (June 23, 1898 – April 24, 1971) is a 1994 National Cowgirl Museum and Hall of Fame inductee.

== Life ==
Randolph was born Cleo Alberta "Florence" Holmes on June 23, 1898, in Augusta, Georgia. When Ringling Brothers Circus visited Augusta in October 1912, she left with them. She learned trick riding and trick roping while on tour with them.

Randolph was a petite woman when she became an adult. It was not until she was 13 that she learned to ride horses. Then she also taught herself stunt riding. She learned to race motorcycles. She was a double for movie stars. She performed in Wild West shows.

== Career ==
In 1914, she joined Captain Jack King's Wild West show with her own production "Princess Mohawk" later renamed "Princess Mohawk's Wild West Hippodrome". The show folded in 1918. Then, "Princess Mohawk" competed in major rodeos such as the Calgary Stampede and the Pendleton Round-Up. After 1922, she used Florence Hughes as her professional name. She won events in trick riding, trick roping, roman riding, bronc riding, and the all-around in rodeos all over. She also won trick riding in Eddie McCarty's rodeo at the Fort Worth Stock Show in 1920. She won at Tex Austin's in Wembley Stadium in London, England, in 1924. She won at the Philadelphia Sesquicentennial Exposition rodeo in 1926. She took first place in trick riding, second place in bronc riding, and the all-around title at Madison Square Garden, thus capturing the freshly inaugurated MGM trophy.

She was inducted into the Rodeo Hall of Fame of the National Cowboy & Western Heritage Museum in 1968.

== Personal life ==
In 1923, she married Louis Fenton, another rodeo performer, but it lasted two years. In 1925 she married Floyd Randolph, a rodeo promoter. She retired in 1939 to Ardmore, Oklahoma, where Floyd owned a saddlery.

She died at her home in Ardmore on April 24, 1971, and was buried at Rose Hill Cemetery.
