= Margie Greenough Henson =

American bull rider

Margie Greenough Henson (November 17, 1908 – August 16, 2004) was a 1978 National Cowgirl Museum and Hall of Fame inductee.

== Life ==
Margie Greenough Henson was born Margie Greenough on a farm near Billings, Montana, on November 17, 1908. She grew up on a working ranch with her seven siblings and all were expected to do daily chores including riding and roping. She married Charlie "Heavy" Henson in 1928. They had one son, Chuck Henson.

== Career ==
In 1929, Henson joined Jack King's Wild West Rodeo. Her experience growing up on a ranch served her well. She started bronc riding and became a champion. Henson entered bronc riding events in major rodeos across the country, often the only women entrant.

After a year with Jack King's, the Hensons joined the Miller Brothers 101 Ranch Show. Henson continued to ride broncs. But she also added to her routine horse racing and steer riding. Later, she even added bull riding. Montana claims some of the best women bronc riders. Four are the most famous: Fannie Sperry Steele, Marie Gibson, and the two Greenough sisters, Alice Greenough and Margie Henson Greenough. Each was a world-class champion. Marge and her sister Alice rode bareback broncs and steers. Both later rode bucking broncos and bulls and won many championships around the country. The sisters were gentile and refined away from the rodeo. They dressed as ladies. But, they also suffered the same as the men when riding and rode the same horses.

Henson and two of her siblings (as the "Riding Greenoughs") were inducted into the Rodeo Hall of Fame of the National Cowboy & Western Heritage Museum in 1983. Margie and her sister Alice retired from rodeo to Tucson, Arizona. They worked in Western films briefly. She died on August 16, 2004, in Arizona.
