= Tad Lucas =

American trick rider and rodeo performer (1902–1990)

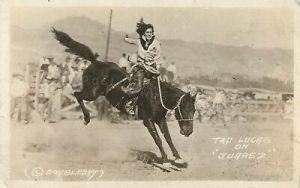
- Tad Lucas photograph by Ralph R. Doubleday
- Occupation: Rodeo competitor
- Discipline: Bronc riding
- Born: September 1, 1902; Cody, Nebraska, US
- Died: February 23, 1990 (aged 87); Fort Worth, Texas

Honors
- Rodeo Hall of Fame; National Cowgirl Hall of Fame; Texas Trail of Fame

Tad Lucas (September 1, 1902 – February 23, 1990) was an American trick rider and rodeo performer.

== Life ==
Tad Lucas was born Barbara Inez Barnes on September 1, 1902. She was born the youngest of 24 children on a pioneer ranch in Cody, Nebraska in the sandhills country. Lucas starting riding at an early age. By the age of 20, she was a professional cowgirl. She soon met cowboy James Edward "Buck" Lucas and married him. She started competing in trick riding, soon reaching the top. When World War II arrived, many women's events were ended. In 1948, the Girls Rodeo Association (GRA) (now the Women's Professional Rodeo Association) was created and stepped in to restore women's roles. Lucas's charter membership and fame assisted.

== Career ==
During World War I, she rode bulls in main streets in Cody to raise money for the Red Cross. In 1921, she was a bronc rider with California Frank's Rodeo Company in Mexico. After she had learned trick riding, she performed with the Tex Austin Rodeo in the Wembley Stadium in London, England. Then she spent many years performing in several events with C.B. Irwin's rodeos. She also performed at Cheyenne Frontier Days, winning the trick riding there eight consecutive times. In 1933, at the Chicago World Fair, she crushed her arm while trick riding. Her arm was in a cast for three years. It did not stop her from performing permanently. She was 62 years old when she rode her last bucking horse in 1964. After that, she sat on the boards of the PRCA board of directors and the Rodeo Historical Society board of directors.

During the 1920s and 30s, Lucas was widely known, winning in events such as bronc riding, trick riding, relay racing, and all-around cowgirl at major rodeos. She toured with some Wild West shows. She also assisted with the GRA and the Professional Rodeo Cowboys Association (PRCA) by serving on their Board of Directors. The Rodeo Historical Society had the assistance of having her on their board.

== Honors ==
- 1968 National Rodeo Hall of Fame of the National Cowboy & Western Heritage Museum
- 1978 National Cowgirl Museum and Hall of Fame
- 1997 Texas Trail of Fame
- Tad Lucas Award - The Rodeo Historical Society and National Cowboy & Western Heritage Museum created an award named after her in her honor.
- 2002 Cheyenne Frontier Days Hall of Fame
- 2007 Texas Cowboy Hall of Fame
