= Jo Decker =

Rodeo secretary

Jo Decker (born March 30, 1925–November 5, 2010) was inducted into the ProRodeo Hall of Fame in 2001.

== Life ==
Jo Decker was born Jo Ramsey on March 30, 1925, in San Angelo, Texas. Decker and her brother Jack were born twins. They both had chores to do on the family ranch. She was gifted with horses and ranch life. Her family had ranches in other states so they traveled a lot. In their free time, she and her brother rode goats and horses.

Just after graduating high school, Decker became one of the "Ranch Sponsor Girls" at the Madison Square Garden Rodeo in New York City in 1944. She was asked again two years later. She married professional rodeo competitor Tater Decker, who was an all-around cowboy in 1946. They had a son, Dirk Decker.

== Career ==
Decker was an accomplished horsewoman. She could out-diagnose the local veterinarian. At the first National Finals Rodeo in 1959, she was involved in many roles, including flag carrier, organizing, and production coordinating. Throughout her rodeo career, she worked as a rodeo secretary for some of the most notable stock contractors in the business. They included the Beutler Brothers, Harry Vold, Mike Cervi, and Hoss Inman. She filled the secretary position at the National Finals Rodeo 6 times. She was very successful as a rodeo secretary as she encompassed many of the qualities needed for the position.

Decker was an active competitor in rodeo in the 1940s and 1950s.

=== Honors ===
- 1999 Tad Lucas Award of the National Cowboy & Western Heritage Museum
- 2000 Rodeo Hall of Fame of the National Cowboy & Western Heritage Museum *Tater was inducted in 1992
- 2000 Colorado Springs Pikes Peak or Bust Rodeo Hall of Fame
- 2003 Texas Rodeo Cowboy Hall of Fame

== Death ==
The Taters lived on their ranch in Clayton, Oklahoma prior to Tater's death and Decker's transfer to a nursing home. According to her son, Decker died on Friday, November 5, 2010. She was at the nursing home where she was a resident, Talihina Manor in Clayton, Oklahoma. Decker was a native of San Angelo, Texas. She was 85 years old when she died of natural causes.

== External sources ==
- 2001 ProRodeo Hall of Fame Inductee Jo Decker
