= Gene Rambo =

American rodeo cowboy

Gene Rambo (June 12, 1920 – February 21, 1988) was an American professional rodeo cowboy who competed in International Rodeo Association (IRA) events in the 1940s and 1950s. Rambo won the IRA's all-around cowboy season championship four times between 1946 and 1950. He took part in professional rodeo events that included bareback bronc riding, steer wrestling, team roping, saddle bronc riding, calf roping, and steer roping.

== Biography ==
Rambo was born in San Miguel, California, on June 12, 1920. His father was a ranch foreman in Monterey County. By the age of seven, Rambo was helping to train horses. At the age of 17, he participated in a rodeo for the first time in 1937; he took part in bull riding in that event. At the 1938 Frontier Days rodeo in Prescott, Arizona, Rambo won "his first big rodeo money", according to The Oklahoman's Willard H. Porter. Rambo went on to participate in International Rodeo Association (IRA) events. In 1944, he was the all-around champion at the Pendleton Round-Up and received the Sam Jackson Trophy for his effort. At a 1945 event in Madison Square Garden in New York City, Rambo suffered a broken bone in his shoulder and was forced to withdraw.

In 1946, he won the all-around IRA season championship. Rambo was the season earnings leader in each of the five disciplines that comprised the IRA all-around standings, becoming the first cowboy to accomplish the feat. In addition, he was the first "to win an all-around world championship and the all-around championship of a major show all in 10 days' competition, plus three individual event championships for the show." Two years later, he claimed his second IRA all-around title. Rambo was the all-around champion, and the leading earner in saddle bronc riding and bareback bronc riding, in that year's Newhall-Saugus Rodeo, and he was the leader in two disciplines at Cheyenne Frontier Days. In 1949, he repeated as the all-around champion, becoming the first cowboy with three all-around season titles. At one San Francisco rodeo, he won around $4,000 in prize money; for the season, he earned 10,723 standings points and approximately $25,000 in earnings. That year, he also won the all-around competition at the Ellensburg Rodeo, and finished third in the Rodeo Cowboys Association (RCA) all-around cowboy season standings, behind Jim Shoulders and Bill Linderman.

In 1950, Rambo won the steer wrestling competition at the Newhall-Saugus Rodeo, and was the calf roping champion at the Fort Worth Stock Show (where he earned $2,500). At the end of that year's IRA season, Rambo was crowned the organization's all-around champion for the fourth time. After that season, he announced that he would not participate in most bull riding disciplines in the future, although he remained active in other events. In 1955, Rambo partnered with Everett Muzio to win the team roping competition at the Reno Rodeo, a feat he repeated in 1958 with Jim Rodriguez. Rambo was the 1957 all-around winner at the California Rodeo Salinas; it was his third championship at the rodeo, having won titles in 1948 and 1949. In two of the next three years (1958 and 1960), he and Rodriguez tied for the California Rodeo Salinas all-around championship. With Rodriguez, Rambo won the team roping average earnings championship at the National Finals Rodeo in 1959 and 1960. The pair also won team roping titles at the California Rodeo Salinas four times in a six-year span between 1957 and 1962. Rambo was a member of the RCA's board of directors from 1962 to 1965.

At 5 feet 10 inches (1.78 m) and 180 pounds (82 kg) during his peak years in rodeo, Rambo was noted for his versatility. He participated in bareback and saddle bronc riding, calf roping, steer roping, and steer wrestling. In addition, he took part in team roping events. Porter said of Rambo that "He was hard as a rock, yet he had the suppleness and flexibility of much smaller riders.

On February 21, 1988, Rambo was killed when he accidentally shot himself while climbing a fence. He was 67 years old.

== Honors ==
In 1955, Rambo was inducted into the National Cowboy & Western Heritage Museum's Rodeo Hall of Fame. The Pendleton Round-Up and Happy Canyon Hall of Fame in Pendleton, Oregon inducted him in 1969, the St. Paul Rodeo Hall of Fame inducted him in 1998, the ProRodeo Hall of Fame inducted him in 1989, and the California Rodeo Salinas Hall of Fame inducted him in 2010.
