= Ralph R. Doubleday =

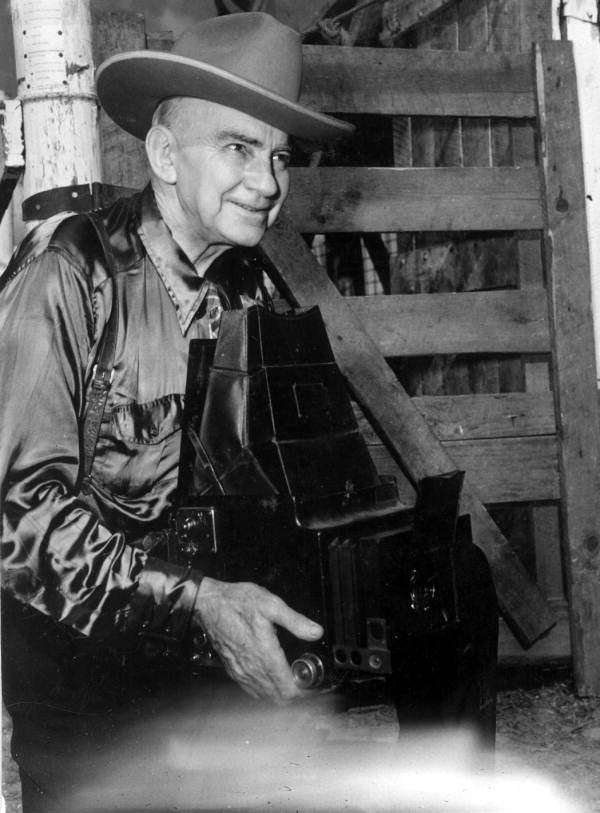
Ralph R. Doubleday and his camera in 1947 (Lakeland, Florida).

Ralph Russell Doubleday (July 4, 1881 – June 30, 1958) was a rodeo photographer in the United States. Rodeo historian and promoter Foghorn Clancy said Doubleday was the "undisputed World's Champion Rodeo Photographer". His work is featured at the Dickinson Museum Center including the museum's Guide to the Ralph R. Doubleday Rodeo Photographs and the traveling exhibit Doubleday's Cowgirls: Women in Rodeo.

Doubleday traveled the U.S. for 40 years photographing rodeos and making picture postcards. He ran a photo studio in Dickinson from 1914 to 1920. It became the Presthus and then the Horstman Studio.

Doubleday was inducted into the National Cowboy & Western Heritage Museum's Rodeo Hall of Fame in 1988.

== See also ==
- Walter S. Bowman

== Self portrait ==
- Ralph R. Doubleday with his camera, ca. 1945. Ralph R. Doubleday Rodeo Photographs 79.026.1850 Dickinson Research Center
