= St. Paul Rodeo Hall of Fame =

Hall of Fame for Cowboys

- Established: 1998
- Location: P.O. Box 175, St. Paul, OR 97137
- Type: Hall of fame
- Website: SPRHF

The St. Paul Rodeo Hall of Fame is a cowboy hall of fame. Established in 1998, the hall of fame was created to honor those individuals who, throughout its history, made significant contributions or distinguished themselves in their performances to the rodeo. Inductees include champions, stock contractors, committee personnel, and livestock.

== Inductees ==
2019

- Elaine Smith
- Bob Gregory
- Grant McKillip
- Richard Ernst
- Butch Knowles

2018

- Charly Crawford
- A.J. Swaim
- Smith & Velvet
- Sam & Claudia (Ernst) Smith
- Dick & Eileen Buyserie

2017

- Joe Ruda
- Frank & Rita Foltz
- Shirley Ernst
- Trevor Knowles
- Red Rock (Livestock)

2016

- Tex Irwin
- Norm Berhorst
- Bill Smith
- Cindy Smith
- Lottie Smith

2015

- Charles Soileau
- Art McKay
- Nancy Schneider
- John & Karren Pohlschneider

2014

- Mel Hyland
- Justin McKee
- Flint Rasmussen
- Lawrence Bunning
- Jean Manegre

2013

- Steve Johnson
- Chuck Lopeman
- Lloyd Faria
- Bill Dolan
- Al Pohlschneider

2012

- Fred Whitfield
- Sonny Hansen
- Loren Obrist/Rollin' Acres
- Don Coleman
- Don Ferschweiler

2011

- Clay Finley
- Les Johnson
- Mary Ann Zielinski
- Ed Brentano
- Bill Smith, Sr.

2010

- Joe Beaver
- Rod Hay
- Joe Baumgartner
- Maurice Smith
- Jerry Halter

2009

- Bill Nelson
- Mike Beers
- Buck & Jason Smith
- Mary McKay
- Carl J. Smith

2008

- Bill Halter
- Roger & Brenda Howard
- Jerri Mann
- Rob Smets
- Dwight Maddox

2007

- John Weisz
- Buddy Schneider
- Gary Simon
- Western Rodeos
- Jackie Wright

2006

- Rudy Doucette
- Jim Bothum
- Don Kish
- Jim Gooding
- Pat Smith

2005

- Bob Tallman
- Steve Coleman
- Doug Brown
- Donna Smith
- Jimmie Cooper

2004

- Ted McKillip
- Clay Cooper
- Judy Ackley
- Ray Richardson
- Stub Johnson

2003

- Bruce Ford
- Pat Nogle
- Wick Peth
- Bill Miller
- George Bernards

2002

- Cy Ferschweiler
- John Growney
- Dee McKillip
- Dean Oliver
- Enoch Walter

2001

- John McKillip, Sr.
- Joe Alexander
- Bob Ragsdale
- Wilbur Plaugher
- Tony Halter

2000

- Christensen Brothers
- Maureen Coleman
- Gene Smith
- Harry Tompkins
- Harry Charters

1999

- Ray Manegre
- Charmayne James
- Harley Tucker
- Buddy Groff
- Jim Shoulders

1998

- William Smith
- Mel Lambert
- Anne K. Smith
- Larry Mahan
- Gene Rambo
