= Sammy Thurman Brackenbury =

American barrel racer (1933–2024)

Sammy Thurman Brackenbury (December 11, 1933 – December 2024) was an American ProRodeo Hall of Fame barrel racer.

== Background ==
Sammy Thurman Brackenbury was born Sammy Lenore on a ranch on the Big Sandy Wash near Wikieup, Arizona. The family moved around when she was a child. Her father, Sam Fancher, was a rodeo competitor in many events. She learned from her father how to ride horses, rope calves, and many other rodeo events. She even chased mustangs in the deserts. Once, at the Rodeo Cowboys Association (RCA) Santa Maria Rodeo, when Brackenberry was registered to compete at barrel racing and her father was registered to compete in team roping, his partner did not show up. Fancher got permission from the RCA for his daughter to rope instead. Fancher was anxious but Brackenberry handled it like an expert. Brackenberry also roped at the California Rodeo Salinas, placed second, and was one of the first women there too.

Brackenbury died on December 26 2024, at the age of 91.

== Career ==
Brackenbury competed in professional rodeo in many events, but her main event was barrel racing. She also used her rodeo skills in the film business, for example, by falling off horses for a movie stunt.

In 1974, under the name Sammy Thurman, she competed on the game show To Tell the Truth. All four panelists correctly guessed her identity.

In addition to being a hall of fame barrel racer, she was also an American World Barrel Racing Champion. She qualified for 11 National Finals Rodeos (NFR). In December 1965, she won the barrel racing world championship at the NFR.

=== Summary ===
Brackenbury had five go-round wins from 1960 through 1968. She placed in twelve consecutive go-rounds (six per year) in her first two NFRs in Scottsdale and Santa Maria in 1960 and 1961. In 1960, she tied for the NFR Average championship in the Girl's Rodeo Association (GRA) with another world champion, Jane Mayo. The next year, 1964, she became the reserve NFR Average champ and the Reserve World Champion, with a career best of $7,042 season earnings. She finished inside the top five of the GRA World Standings five times. The climax of her career was winning the World Barrel Racing Championship in 1965.

== Honors ==
- 2012 Rodeo Hall of Fame in the National Cowboy & Western Heritage Museum
- 2013 WPRA California Circuit True Grit award
- 2018 WPRA California Pioneer Cowgirl award
- 2019 ProRodeo Hall of Fame
