= Dale Smith (cowboy) =

American rodeo performer and administrator

Dale Smith (February 6, 1928 – January 15, 2017) was an American rodeo cowboy and administrator.

== Rodeo career ==
=== Competition ===
Born in Safford, Arizona, Smith was a two-time team roping world champion. He finished second once a mere $13 away from a third title. Smith was the first cowboy to qualify for the National Finals Rodeo in three events in the same season. He was also the first to qualify in a total of four events.

=== Administration ===
Smith served three non-consecutive stints as the Professional Rodeo Cowboys Association president. Among his initiatives, he instituted the 100-point system in bull riding.

== Honors ==
Dale Smith is a 1995 inductee of the Rodeo Hall of Fame of the National Cowboy and Western Heritage Museum. He is a 1979 inductee of the ProRodeo Hall of Fame.

== Personal life ==
Smith was a member of the Church of Jesus Christ of Latter-day Saints.
