= Fannie Sperry Steele =

American rodeo cowgirl

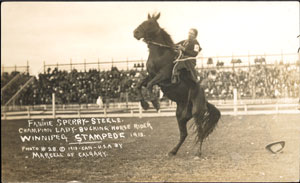
Fannie Sperry-Steele, Champion Lady Bucking Horse Rider, Winnipeg Stampede, 1913 Edward F. Marcell, Calgary, Alberta, Canada, 1913

Fannie Sperry Steele (March 27, 1887 – February 11, 1983), born Fannie Sperry, was an American bronc rider and rodeo performer from Montana. She was one of the first women inducted into the Rodeo Hall of Fame of the National Cowboy and Western Heritage Museum in 1975, and the first Montana native in the National Cowgirl Hall of Fame in 1978.

== Biography ==
Born Fannie Sperry on March 27, 1887 in the Beartooth Mountains to Rachel and Datus Sperry, Fannie was a first-generation Montanan. She was taught to ride by the time she could walk by her mother Rachel, since her father was prevented from riding by an old injury.

The only woman rider of the time to ride her entire career without tying her stirrups under the horse’s belly (a practice rodeo judges allowed for women only), Sperry Steele inherited her love of horses, especially pintos, from her mother. She won several awards for her riding in professional rodeos during her lifetime, including Women's Bucking Horse Champion of Montana in 1904 at the age of 17, and Lady Bucking Horse Champion of the World of the first Calgary Stampede rodeo in 1912, where hundreds of cowboys from Western Canada, the United States and Mexico competed for thousands of dollars in prizes. In the Calgary Stampede, Sperry Steele had ridden the horse Red Wing, a wild bronc who had trampled fellow rider Joe LaMar to death only days earlier.

She married Bill Steele, a fellow rodeo rider and arena clown, on April 30, 1913, and together they began operating their own Wild West show and performed with the Miller Brothers' 101 Wild West Show and the Irwin Brothers' Wild West Show. Besides her horsemanship, Sperry Steele was also skilled with a rifle. During their shows, she would often shoot cigars out of her husband's mouth.

Sperry Steele competed for the last time in 1925 at Bozeman, and continued riding exhibition into her 50s. Fannie and Bill became stock contractors near Helena, providing horses and bulls for rodeos all over the West. She also became one of four women in the US who were licensed outfitter-guides. She did not completely retire from riding until 1974, at the age of 87, when she entered a rest home in Helena, Montana. In 1975, she became the first woman inducted into the Rodeo Hall of Fame of the National Cowboy & Western Heritage Museum and in 1978, she was inducted into the National Cowgirl Hall of Fame. She died on February 11, 1983.

== See also ==
- Bonnie McCarroll
- Annie Oakley
- Calamity Jane
- Lucille Mulhall
- May Lillie
- Ruth Roach
