= Rick Young =

American bullfighter and rodeo clown (1934–2026)

- Young in 2022
- Born: March 3, 1934; Houston, Texas, U.S.
- Died: March 20, 2026 (aged 92)
- Education: Southeastern Louisiana University
- Occupations: Bullfighter, rodeo clown
- Years active: 1959–2019
- Spouse: Bernie Lee Young

Rick Young (March 3, 1934 – March 20, 2026), also known as The Ragin' Cajun, was an American bullfighter and rodeo clown. He worked for the Professional Rodeo Cowboys Association (PRCA).

Young was born in Houston, Texas, on March 3, 1934. He was raised on his family's Appaloosa horse ranch near Tickfaw, Louisiana. He attended and graduated from Southeastern Louisiana University. He began his rodeo career in 1959, and was a rodeo clown and bullfighter for 35 years. He worked as a bullfighter at the 1974 National Finals Rodeo (NFR) in Oklahoma City, Oklahoma, and was named the PRCA Clown of the Year in 1980. He was the Coors Man in the Can at the NFR in Las Vegas, Nevada, in 1991, 1994, 1996, and 1997. He retired in 2019, at the age of 85.

In 2004, Young was inducted into the National Rodeo Hall of Fame, and in 2022, Young was inducted into the ProRodeo Hall of Fame.

Young died on March 20, 2026, at the age of 92.
