= National Rodeo Hall of Fame =

Hall of Fame for rodeo

- Established: 1955
- Location: Oklahoma City, Oklahoma
- Type: Hall of fame
- Website: Official Site

The National Rodeo Hall of Fame was established by the National Cowboy & Western Heritage Museum in 1955. Located in Oklahoma City, Oklahoma, U.S., the Hall was created to celebrate the contributions of cowboys and cowgirls from around the world. The hall is a tribute to the most notable rodeo performers, who established the path for today's champions. The hall of fame has the largest rodeo collection in the nation and claims to be the first rodeo hall of fame.

Inductees include competitors from the main rodeo events such as bull riding, bronc riding, barrel racing, steer wrestling, tie-down roping, steer roping, and team roping. Other events may be included.

== Members of the National Rodeo Hall of Fame ==
The following are National Rodeo Hall of Fame member inductees, followed by their state, birth, death, and year inducted.

Name	State	Year Inducted	Ref
Doff Aber	Wyoming	1966	
Leon Adams	Oklahoma	2004	
Ira Akers	Texas	1988 PRHS	
Eddy Akridge	Nevada	1999	
Joe Alexander	California	2003	
Walter Alsbaugh	Colorado	2009	
Jim Bob Altizer	Texas	1995	
Guy Allen	Texas	2022	
Jerry Ambler	Canada	1998	
Dave Appleton	Texas	1988	
Dave Appleton	Australia/Texas	2012	
Carl Arnold	Arizona	1985	
Ted Ashworth	California	2014	
Bob Askin	Montana	1978	
Tex Austin	New Mexico	1976	
Tillie Baldwin	Connecticut	2004	
Bob Barmby	California	1996	
Jack Barnes	Texas	2016	
Bob Barnes	Iowa	2010	
Hadley Barrett	Nebraska	2008	
Earl Bascom	Utah	2013	
Ben Bates	Texas	2022	
Charley Beals	Oklahoma	2010	
Joe Beaver	Texas	1995	
Fred Beeson	Kansas	1991	
Ray Bell	California	1986	
Hugh Bennett	Colorado	1977	
Randy Bernard	California	2014	
Ote Berry	South Dakota	2016	
Ace Berry	California	2002	
Lynn Beutler	Oklahoma	1988	
Jake Beutler	Oklahoma	2022	
John "Jiggs" Beutler	Oklahoma	2010	
Elra Beutler	Oklahoma	1982	
Vick Blackstone	Florida	1982	
Bertha Kaepernik Blancett	Colorado	1975	
Earl Blevins	Wyoming	1984 PRHS	
Ken Boen	Arkansas	1991	
Berenice Dossey Bolen	Idaho	1991	
Ricky Bolin	Texas	2020	
Paul Bond	Arizona	1992	
C.R. Boucher	Montana	2001	
Everett Bowman	Arizona	1955	
John Bowman	California	1955	
Edward Bowman	Colorado	1962	
Sammy Thurman Brackenbury	California	2012	
Buff Brady	California	1992	
Trevor Brazile	Texas	2002	
Harry Henry Brennan	Wyoming	1979	
Louis Brooks	Oklahoma	1955	
Bobby W. "Hooter" Brown	Texas	2020	
Freckles Brown	Oklahoma	1986 PRHS	
Doug Brown	Oregon	2014	
Winston Bruce	Canada	2007	
Emma "PeeWee" Burge	California	2012	
Clyde Burk	Oklahoma	1966	
A. H. (Hippy) Burmister	California	1995	
Cuff Burrell	California	1997	
Jack Buschborn	Arkansas	1998	
Wanda Harper Bush	Texas	2001	
Chester Byers	Texas	1969	
James Bynum	Texas	1993	
Lee Caldwell	Oregon	1966	
Jerold Camarillo	California	2003	
Leo Camarillo	California	1975	
Yakima Canutt	Washington	1976	
Paul Carney	Colorado	1961	
Clay Carr	California	1955	
J. Ellison Carroll	Texas	1976	
Barton Carter	Oklahoma	2005	
Joe Chase, Jr.	North Dakota	2009	
Hank Christensen	Oregon	1988 PRHS	
Albert "Bobbie" Christensen	Oregon	2011	
Foghorn Clancy	Texas	1991	
Bobby Clark	Oklahoma	1991	
Gene Clark	Oklahoma	1991	
Bart Clennon	Arizona	1996	
Ava Colborn	Texas	1987 PRHS	
Everett E. Colborn	Idaho	1981	
Bennie Combs	Oklahoma	2002	
Willard Combs	Oklahoma	2002	
Lex Connelly	California	1987 PRHS	
Edith Happy Connelly	Massachusetts	2000	
Bob Cook	California	2005	
Roy Cooper	Oklahoma	1983	
Tuffy Cooper	New Mexico	1998	
Felix Cooper	Louisiana	2001	
Clay Cooper	Arizona	2016	
Jimmie Cooper	New Mexico	1981	
Deb Copenhaver	Washington	1991	
Cecil Cornish	Oklahoma	1991	
Breezy Cox	Arizona	1982	
Bob Crosby	New Mexico	1966	
Bob Cullison	Nebraska	2014	
Andy Curtis	Oklahoma	1986 PRHS	
Eddie Curtis	Oklahoma	1971	
Sonny Davis	Texas	1993	
Gordon Davis	California	1994	
Shawn Davis	Nevada	2011	
Tater Decker	Oklahoma	1992	
Jo Decker	Texas	2000	
Bobby DelVecchio	New York	2015	
Myrtis Dightman	Texas	1997	
George Doak	Texas	2001	
Ross Dollarhide, Jr.	Oregon	2003	
Carl Dossey	Arizona	2006	
Ralph R. Doubleday	Iowa	1988	
Buff Douthitt	New Mexico	2001	
Wayne Dunafon	Colorado	2005	
Rex Dunn	Texas	2013	
Roy Duvall	Oklahoma	1988	
C.L. "Buck" Echols	Texas	2015	
John Edwards	Montana	2015	
George Elliot	Oklahoma	2006	
Verne Elliot	Colorado	1973	
Junior Eskew	Oklahoma	1984	
Jim Eskew	Oklahoma	1992	
Bobby Estes	Texas	1991	
Billy Etbauer	South Dakota	2013	
Dan Etbauer	South Dakota	2013	
Robert Etbauer	South Dakota	2013	
John Farris	Texas	2010	
Mildred Farris	Texas	2010	
Bill Feddersen	Oklahoma	2013	
Lewis Feild	Utah	1985	
Bob Feist	California	2015	
Tom Ferguson	Oklahoma	1974	
George Fletcher	Oregon	2001	
Kid Fletcher	Colorado	1966	
Denny Flynn	Arkansas	2010	
Troy C. Fort	New Mexico	1986	
Pete Fredericks	North Dakota	2012	
Lane Frost	Colorado	2008	
Clyde Frost	Colorado	2010	
Jasbo Fulkerson	Texas	2001	
Floyd Gale	Oklahoma	1991	
Amye Gamblin	Texas	1992	
Joe Gardner	Texas	1979	
Sam Garrett	California	1985	
D.J. (Kajun Kidd) Gaudin	Texas	1996	
Don Gay	Texas	2008	
Jimmy Gibbs Munroe	Texas	2016	
Marie "Ma" Gibson	Canada	2006	
Gary Gist		2022	
Brad Gjermundson	Nebraska	2012	
Buck Goodspeed	Oklahoma	1987	
Jess Goodspeed	Oklahoma	1987	
Henry Grammer	Oklahoma	2000	
Alice Greenough	Montana	1983	
Margie (Henson) Greenough	Montana	1983	
Turk Greenough	Montana	1983	
Dick Griffith	Oklahoma	1984	
Buddy Groff	Texas	2000	
Tom Hadley	Texas	2004	
Bill Hancock	Texas	1990	
Sonny Hancock	New Mexico	1997	
Don Happy	California	2011	
Howard Harris III	Oklahoma	2005	
Fox Hastings	Texas	1987	
Mike Hastings	Wyoming	1974	
John Hatley	New Mexico	2004	
Del Haverty	Nevada	1996	
Cleo OL. Hearn		2022	
Richard "Tuff" Hedeman	Texas	2020	
Hoyt Hefner	Texas	1987 PRHS	
DeVere Helfrich	Oregon	1991	
Duane Hennigh	Kansas	2000	
Chuck Henson	Arizona	2009	
Homer Holcomb	Idaho	1982	
Marvin Holmes	Oklahoma	2014	
Ethel A. (Ma) Hopkins	Arizona	1999	
Jim Houston	Nebraska	2012	
Duane Howard	North Dakota	2007	
Mel Hyland	Canada	2006	
C.B. Irwin	Wyoming	1975	
Buster Ivory	Texas	1990	
Perry Ivory	California	1998	
June Ivory	Texas	2004	
Ryan Jarrett	Georgia	2010	
Andy Jauregui	California	1979	
Clint Johnson	Texas	1999	
Ben Johnson	Oklahoma	1961	
Bernis Johnson	Texas	2005	
Sherry Johnson Combs	Oklahoma	2005	
Cecil Jones	California	1997	
John W. Jones	California	2000	
Martha Josey	Texas	2011	
John Justin, Jr.	Texas	2003	
Larry Kane	Montana	2010	
Reg Kesler	Texas	2009	
The Kirbys	Texas	2020	
Tommy Kirnan	New Jersey	1977	
Harry Knight	Canada	1985	
Pete Knight	Canada	1958	
Cody Lambert	New Mexico	2020	
Mel Lambert	Oregon	1998	
Chris LeDoux	Wyoming	2006	
Abe Lefton	California	1990	
C.O. (Dogtown Slim) Leuschner	Texas	1996	
G.K. Lewallen	Texas	1994	
Roy Lewis	Nebraska	2011	
Jim Like	Colorado	1993	
Herman Linder	Canada	1980	
Bud Linderman	Montana	1987 PRHS	
Walt Linderman	Montana	2016	
Bill Linderman	Montana	1966	
John Lindsey	Texas	1986	
Howard "Sonny" Linger	Montana	2011	
Pete Logan	Montana	1991	
Hughie Long	Canada	1984	
Fred Lowry	Oklahoma	1987	
Buck Lucas	Nebraska	2002	
Tad Barnes Lucas	Texas	1968	
Tommy Lucia	Texas	2015	
Chris Lybbert	California	1982	
Phil Lyne	Texas	1971	
Ronald "Buddy" Lytle	Mississippi	2010	
James "Russ" Madison, Jr.	South Dakota	2012	
Charles Maggini	California	2003	
Larry Mahan	Oregon	1966	
Toots Mansfield	Texas	1981	
Bill Martinelli	California	2014	
Harley May	California	1988 PRHS	
Don Mayo	Iowa	2002	
John McBeth	Kansas	2013	
Bonnie McCarroll	Idaho	2002	
Frank McCarroll	Minnesota	2007	
Eddie McCarty	Wyoming	1970	
Jake McClure	New Mexico	1955	
Howard McCrory	South Dakota	1984 PRHS	
John Wesley McEntire	Oklahoma	1984	
Clark McEntire	Oklahoma	1988	
Vera McGinnis	California	1985	
Rusty McGinty	Texas	1995	
Clay McGonagill	New Mexico	1975	
Gene McLaughlin	Pennsylvania	2013	
Don McLaughlin	Colorado	1990	
Kenny McLean	Canada	2005	
Bill McMacken	South Dakota	2012	
Clem McSpadden	Oklahoma	1989	
Junior Meek	Texas	2001	
Richard Merchant	Arizona	1983	
King Merritt	Wyoming	1977	
Clyde S. Miller	Iowa	2002	
John Miller	Arizona	2009	
George Mills	Colorado	1987 PRHS	
Montie Montana	California	1989	
Dan Mortensen	Montana	1997	
Dixie Lee Reger Mosley	Oklahoma	2003	
Lucille Mulhall	Oklahoma	1975	
Burel Mulkey	Idaho	1955	
Johnnie Mullens	Arizona	1975	
Dan "Bud" Munroe	Montana	2016	
Leo Murray	Oklahoma	1986	
Ty Murray	Texas	1989	
Alvin Nelson	South Dakota	2006	
Pauline Nesbitt	Oklahoma	1999	
Don Nesbitt	Arizona	1955	
Tom Nesmith	Oklahoma	1962	
Cody Ohl	Texas	2001	
Dean Oliver	Idaho	1963	
Jerry Olson	South Dakota	2015	
Vicente Oropeza	Mexico	1975	
Bud Parker	Texas	2015	
Chuck Parkison	California	2008	
George Paul	Texas	2007	
Wick Peth	Washington	2016	
Homer Pettigrew	New Mexico	1955	
Slim Pickens	California	1986 PRHS	
Dee Pickett	Idaho	1984	
Bill Pickett	Oklahoma	1972	
B.J. Pierce	New Mexico	2015	
Wilbur Plaugher	California	2007	
Willard H. Porter	Florida	1991	
T. B. Porter	Louisiana	2015	
Mel Potter	Arizona	2005	
Booger Red Privett	Texas	1975	
Gene Pruett	Idaho	1980	
Ikua Purdy	Hawaii	1999	
John Quintana	Idaho	2013	
Bob Ragsdale	Montana	2003	
Gene Rambo	California	1955	
Glenn Randall	California	1989	
Florence Hughes Fenton Randolph	Oklahoma	1968	
Tom Reeves	Nebraska	2022	
Dennis Reiners	Arizona	2014	
Benny Reynolds	Montana	1961	
John Rhodes	Arizona	1973	
Thomas Rhodes	Arizona	1981	
Nowata Slim Richardson	Oklahoma	1981	
Lanham Riley	Texas	1993	
Mitzi Lucas Riley	Texas	1995	
Doyle Riley	Texas	1998	
Ruth Scantlin Roach	Texas	1989	
Coke T. Roberds	Colorado	1964	
Emmett C. Roberts	Kansas	1984 PRHS	
Gerald Roberts	Kansas	1955	
Ken Roberts	Kansas	1980	
Bob Robinson	AB, Canada	2014	
Jerome Robinson	Nebraska	2020	
Lee Robinson	Texas	1967	
Jack Roddy	California	1997	
Rufus Rollens	Oklahoma	1988	
Gene Ross	Oklahoma	1986	
Horton Alexander "Cotton" Rosser	California	2009	
Harry Rowell	California	1985	
Maggie Rowell	California	1985	
Ike Rude	Oklahoma	1974	
Buck Rutherford	Oklahoma	1955	
Paddy Ryan	Montana	1978	
Juan Salinas	Texas	1991	
Charlie Sampson	California	2008	
Fern Sawyer	New Mexico	1991	
Asbury Schell	Arizona	2003	
Frank Schneider	California	1994	
Johnie Scheider	California	1955	
Jimmy Schumacher	Arizona	2002	
Pat Scudder	Oklahoma	2002	
Ronnye Sewalt	Texas	2003	
Everett Shaw	Oklahoma	1980	
Reine Hafley Shelton	Texas	1991	
Dick Shelton	Texas	1975	
Chuck Sheppard	Arizona	1985	
Nancy Kelley Sheppard	Arizona	1996	
Lynn Sheppard	Arizona	2004	
Jim Shoulders	Oklahoma	1955	
Charley Shultz	Oklahoma	1999	
Tex Slocum	Texas	2004	
Rob Smets	California	2019	
Frances Smith	Texas	2014	
Dale D. Smith	Arizona	1995	
Bill Smith	Montana	2000	
Velda Tindall Smith	Texas	2005	
Vernon "Dude" Smith, Jr.	Texas	2006	
Jim W. Snively	Oklahoma	1998	
Smokey Snyder	Canada	1977	
Doc Sorensen	Idaho	1988 PRHS	
Buckshot Sorrels	Arizona	1990	
Thad Sowder	Colorado	1960	
Jesse Stahl	California	1979	
Fannie Sperry Steele	Montana	1975	
Bobby Steiner	Texas		
Buck Steiner	Texas	1993	
Sid Steiner	Texas		
Tommy Steiner	Texas	1995	
Floyd Stillings	California	1987	
J.W. Stoker	Texas	1999	
Hugh Strickland	Idaho	1968	
Mabel DeLong Strickland	Washington	1981	
Leonard Stroud	Colorado	1965	
Jackson Sundown	Idaho	1976	
Cy Taillon	Montana	1986 PRHS	
Bob Tallman	Texas	2007	
Dan Taylor	Texas	2006	
Howard Tegland	South Dakota	1991	
Jim Tescher	North Dakota	2004	
Tom Tescher	North Dakota	2009	
Earl Ernest Thode	South Dakota	1955	
Claire Belcher Thompson	Texas	2008	
Casey Tibbs	South Dakota	1955	
Paul Tierney	South Dakota	1980	
Homer Todd	Arkansas	1991	
Harry Tompkins	Texas	1955	
C.E. Tooke	Montana	2008	
Lorena Trickey	Oregon	2000	
Fritz Truan	California	1961	
Dick Truitt	Oklahoma	1983	
Harley Tucker	Oregon	1997	
Sonny Tureman	Oregon	2000	
Clyde Vamvoras	Louisiana	2007	
C. Monroe Veach	Missouri	1993	
Harry Vold	Colorado	2009	
Enoch Walker	Wyoming	1988 PRHS	
William "Bill" Ward	California	2001	
Leonard Ward	Oregon	1955	
Guy Weadick	Canada	1975	
Shoat Webster	Oklahoma	1990	
Guy Weeks	Texas	1992	
Billy Weeks	Texas	1998	
Joe Welch	New Mexico	1988	
Everett (Slim) Whaley	Oklahoma	1986	
Ray Wharton	Texas	1994	
Todd Whatley	Oklahoma	1955	
Vivian White	Oklahoma	1991	
Hub Whiteman	Texas	1983	
Jim Whiteman	Texas	1988 PRHS	
Fred Whitfield	Texas	2000	
Don Wilcox	Oklahoma	1994	
George Williams	Arizona	2008	
Nancy Bragg Witmer	Kansas	1999	
Marty Wood	Canada	2008	
Walt Woodard	California	2010	
Tee Woolman	Texas	2022	
Sonny Worrell	Kansas	1994	
Phil Yoder	Wyoming	1987	
Rick Young	Louisiana	2004	
Florence Price Youree	Oklahoma	2009	
Oral Harris Zumwalt	Montana	1963	

== See also ==
- Category:People of the American Old West
- Hall of Great Western Performers
- Hall of Great Westerners
