= T. B. Porter =

American bulldogger and calf roper (1927–2026)

- Born: T. Barrett Porter; March 9, 1927; Pineville, Louisiana, U.S.
- Died: June 13, 2026 (aged 99); Leesville, Louisiana, U.S.
- Occupations: Bulldogger, calf roper
- Spouse(s): Dorothy Wampler (died. 1982) Pat Porter

T. Barrett Porter (March 9, 1927 – June 13, 2026) was an American bulldogger and calf roper.

== Early life and career ==
Porter was born in Pineville, Louisiana, the son of J. A. and Elsie Porter. At the age of five, he began roping calves, riding and training animals at his family's ranch. At around the age of sixteen, he competed in rodeo competitions.

In 1948, Porter placed first place in the bulldogging event at the Lions Club Rodeo in Alexandria, Louisiana. In 1949, he was named the calf roping champion at Madison Square Garden in New York, and in the same year, he competed at the World Rodeo in Boston, Massachusetts. In 1959, he competed at the National Finals Rodeo in Dallas, Texas.

In 2015, Porter was inducted into the National Rodeo Hall of Fame, and in 2019, he was inducted into the Louisiana Sports Hall of Fame.

== Personal life and death ==
Porter was married twice. He was first married to Dorothy Wampler. Their marriage lasted until her death in 1982. After the death of his first wife, he married Pat. His second marriage lasted until his death in 2026.

Porter died in Leesville, Louisiana, on June 13, 2026, at the age of 99.
