= Montie Montana =

American trick rider and roper

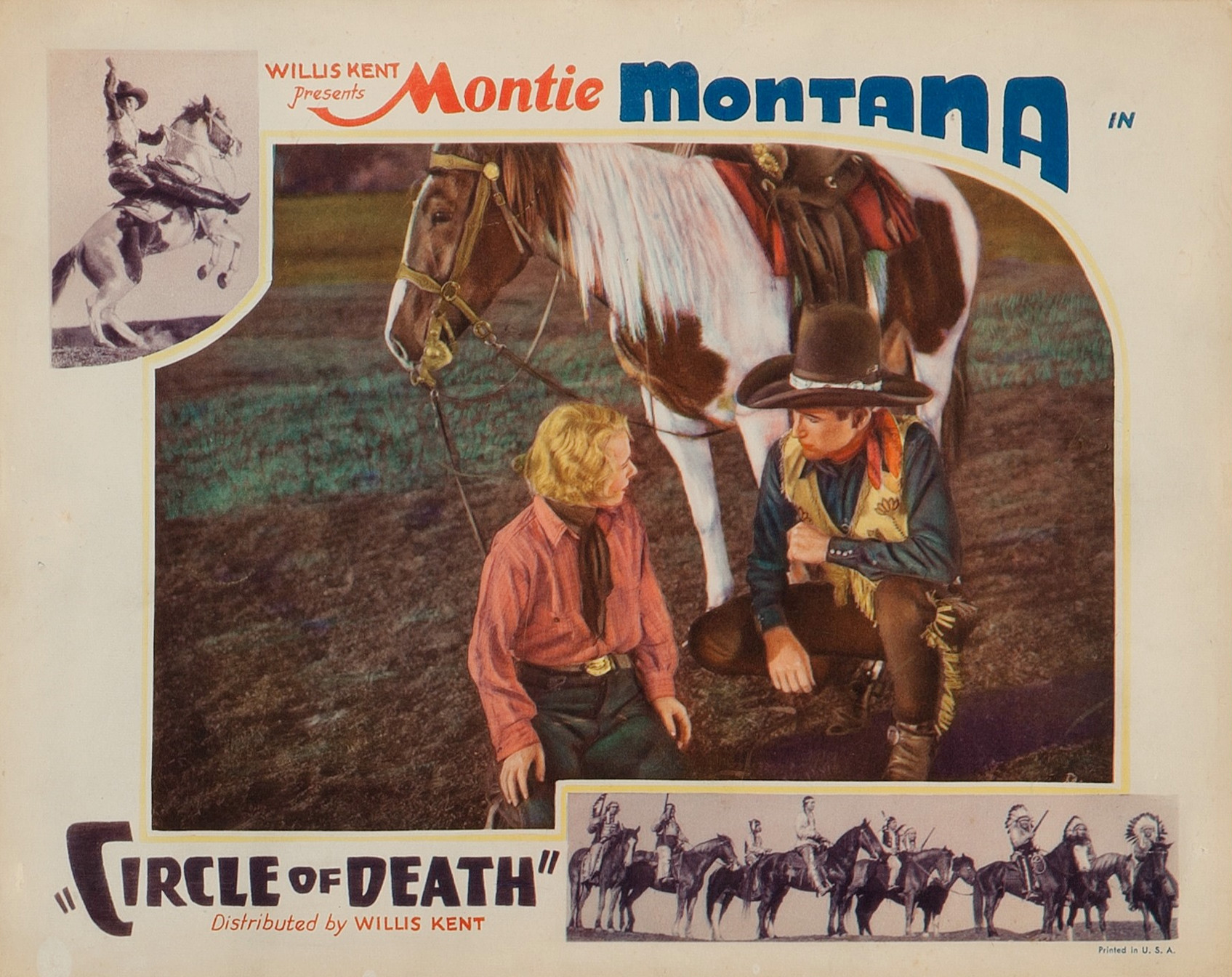
- Lobby card for The Circle of Death (1935) with Tove Linden and Montie Montana
- Born: Owen Harlen Mickel; June 21, 1910; Wolf Point, Montana, U.S.
- Died: May 20, 1998 (aged 87); Los Angeles, California, U.S.
- Resting place: Oakwood Memorial Park Cemetery, Chatsworth, California, U.S.
- Occupations: Rodeo trick rider, trick roper, actor, stuntman
- Years active: 1925–1998
- Known for: Tournament of Roses Parade participant; lassoing President Dwight D. Eisenhower in 1953
- Spouse(s): Louise A. Archer ( 1934 (1972))
- Children: 2, including Montie Montana Jr.

Montie Montana (born Owen Harlen Mickel; June 21, 1910 – May 20, 1998) was a rodeo trick rider and trick roper, actor, stuntman and cowboy inducted into the ProRodeo Hall of Fame in 1994.

== Biography ==
Montana was born in Wolf Point, Montana, in 1910. He was a perennial participant in the Tournament of Roses Parade until his death in Los Angeles, California, in 1998. Television viewers know him from more than 60 appearances, waving to the crowd from his silver saddle. During the first inauguration of Dwight D. Eisenhower as the 34th President of the United States on January 20, 1953, Montana lassoed the president after his swearing-in. He can be seen as a contestant on the May 7, 1959 television broadcast of You Bet Your Life, along with his horse Rex.

Montana would go to elementary schools and perform with Rex. He was at Camellia Avenue Elementary School in North Hollywood, California, in 1959, and he would talk about the rubber horseshoes Rex would be fitted with so Rex would not slip on the asphalt playground while Montie was riding Rex. He performed rope tricks on and off of Rex, and would pass out photos of him and Rex to the students at the end of his show.

In 1996, a Golden Palm Star on the Palm Springs, California, Walk of Stars was dedicated to him. He was buried at the Oakwood Memorial Park in Chatsworth, California.

== Filmography ==
Year	Title	Role	Notes
1932	The Saddle Buster	Rodeo Performer	Uncredited
1934	Stand Up and Cheer!	Rope Spinner	Uncredited
1935	The Circle of Death	Little Buffalo, alias Jim Little	
1935	Border Vengeance	Montie Montana, Trick Rider	Uncredited
1935	Melody Trail	Rodeo Rider	Uncredited
1936	Comin' Round the Mountain	Roper	Uncredited
1936	Gun Smoke		
1939	The Kid from Texas	Trick Rider	Uncredited
1943	Riders of the Deadline	Ranger Kelton	
1944	Take It Big	Show Performer	Uncredited
1944	Man from Frisco	Montana	Uncredited
1949	Down Dakota Way	Sheriff Holbrook	
1952	The Story of Will Rogers	Trick Roping Double for Will Rogers Jr.	Uncredited
1954	The Boy from Oklahoma	Roper	Uncredited
1960	The Rifleman	Stage Driver	
1962	The Man Who Shot Liberty Valance	Cowboy on Pinto Pony	Uncredited
1963	Hud	Cowboy	Uncredited
1964	Cheyenne Autumn	Trooper	Uncredited
1968	Arizona Bushwhackers	Stage Driver	
1972	The Young Rounders		(final film role)

== Honors ==
- 1989 Rodeo Hall of Fame of the National Cowboy and Western Heritage Museum
- 1990 Pendleton Round-Up and Happy Canyon Hall of Fame
- 1994 ProRodeo Hall of Fame
- 1997 Ellensburg Rodeo Hall of Fame
- 2011 Cheyenne Frontier Days Hall of Fame
- 2015 Montana Cowboy Hall of Fame & Western Heritage
