= Clay Carr =

American rodeo cowboy

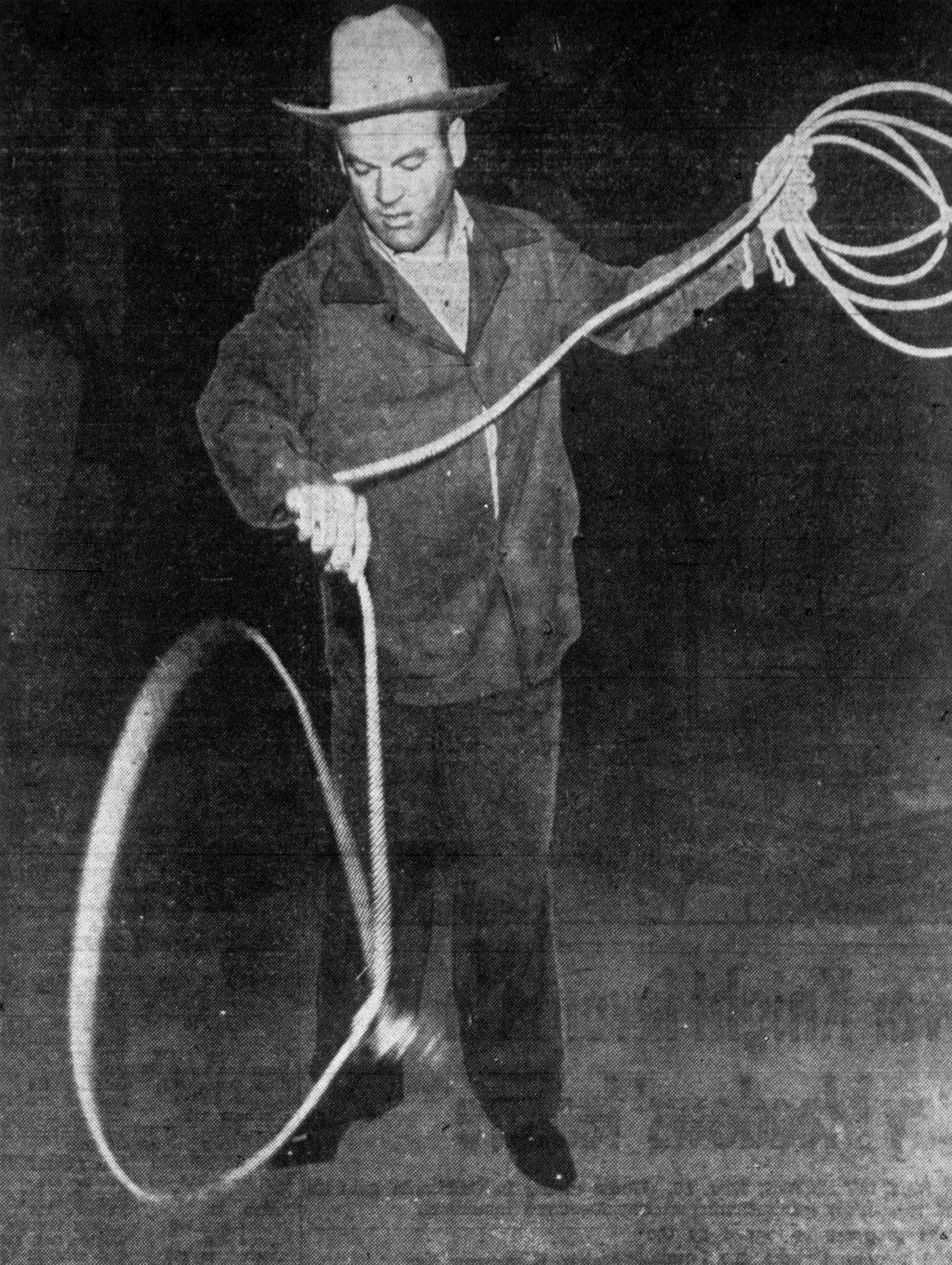
Carr, circa 1942

Clay Carr (April 17, 1909 – April 1957) was an American rodeo cowboy who competed in the 1930s and 1940s. He was a two-time All-Around Cowboy champion in the Rodeo Association of America (RAA), and won three season discipline titles: two in steer roping and one in saddle bronc riding. In 1930, he won the All-Around Cowboy title and two season discipline championships to become the first Triple Crown winner in rodeo history. Carr's championships are recognized by the modern Professional Rodeo Cowboys Association (PRCA).

== Biography ==
Carr was born in Farmersville, California. Having been raised on a cattle ranch, at the age of four he learned how to ride horses, and he gained further rodeo-related skills in his youth. Once, he was bitten on the leg by a rattlesnake while riding a horse, and required a week of medical treatment to recover.

During his career, he lived in Visalia. In 1930, Carr claimed the RAA All-Around Cowboy championship, and was the winner of two season discipline championships, in the saddle bronc and steer roping categories. The three championships in one season gave Carr a Triple Crown, the first ever achieved in rodeo. As of 2015, he is one of 10 cowboys to accomplish the feat. Carr's second All-Around Cowboy title came in 1933; two years later, he was gored by a bull at a rodeo in Visalia, suffering a perforation of his abdomen. Carr finished second in the 1936 Chicago rodeo's combined bronc riding and calf roping standings, behind Lonnie Rooney. In 1940, he added a second steer roping championship. Carr was also a three-time champion of the California Rodeo, and appeared as a film actor in Westerns.

After various mergers, the RAA was absorbed into the Rodeo Cowboys Association (RCA), which later became known as the modern PRCA. That association uses RAA standings from the pre-RCA era in its yearly rankings. Therefore, Carr is recognized by the PRCA as a world champion for the five season titles he won from 1930 to 1940.

Sports Illustrated's Susan Davis called Carr "the Babe Ruth of rodeo riders". Author Clifford P. Westermeier described him as "one of the great cowboys of the age", and said of his personality that he was "a strange man, difficult to meet and extremely hard to get acquainted with." Regardless, Carr was a respected figure in the rodeo world; Westermeier wrote that he was "regarded as a very tough customer in a business deal, fight, or a poker game." Carr was considered strongest in rodeos held in the western U.S., and rarely competed on the East Coast, although he did participate in some rodeos overseas. The Rodeo Hall of Fame of the National Cowboy and Western Heritage Museum inducted Carr in 1955. He was also inducted into the ProRodeo Hall of Fame in 1979, and the California Rodeo Salinas Hall of Fame in 2016.
