= Foghorn Clancy =

American historian

Frederick Melton "Foghorn" Clancy (April 4, 1882, Phenix City, Alabama – April 28, 1957) was a rodeo promoter, historian and author.

He wrote My Fifty Years in Rodeo: Living with Cowboys, Horses and Danger (San Antonio: Naylor Company, 1952).

Clancy was inducted into the National Cowboy & Western Heritage Museum's Rodeo Hall of Fame in 1991.
