= Ruth Roach =

American female bronc rider

Ruth Scantlin, later Ruth Scantlin Roach, later Ruth Scantlin Roach Salmon (1896 – June 26, 1986), was a professional bronc rider, and world champion rodeo cowgirl.

== Biography ==
Ruth Scantlin 24-year career began in 1914 and ended in 1938, when she retired from the rodeo and started a ranching business in Nocona, Texas, with her husband, Fred Salmon. She is an inductee in the National Cowgirl Hall of Fame (1989), the National Rodeo Hall of Fame in the National Cowboy & Western Heritage Museum formerly known as the National Cowboy Hall of Fame (1989) and the National Multicultural Western Heritage Museum in 2011. She traveled the world with the Buffalo Bill Wild West Show and The 101 Real Wild West Show. Bronc riding was her favorite event, although she performed and won championship titles in other areas (as Ruth Roach). During her career she won the titles of World's Champion All Around Cowgirl, World's Champion Trick Rider, and World's Champion Girl Bronc Rider.

== Personal life ==
Ruth Scantlin married fellow rider Brian Roach (winner of the 1919 Calgary Stampede bronc riding competition); after their divorce, she retained the name Roach for the rest of her career for professional reasons. She later married another rider, Ambrose Richardson, and Fred Alvord, a rodeo director and cowboy. Her final marriage was to Fred Salmon, a rancher.
