= Tex Austin =

American rodeo promoter (1885–1938)

John Van "Tex" Austin
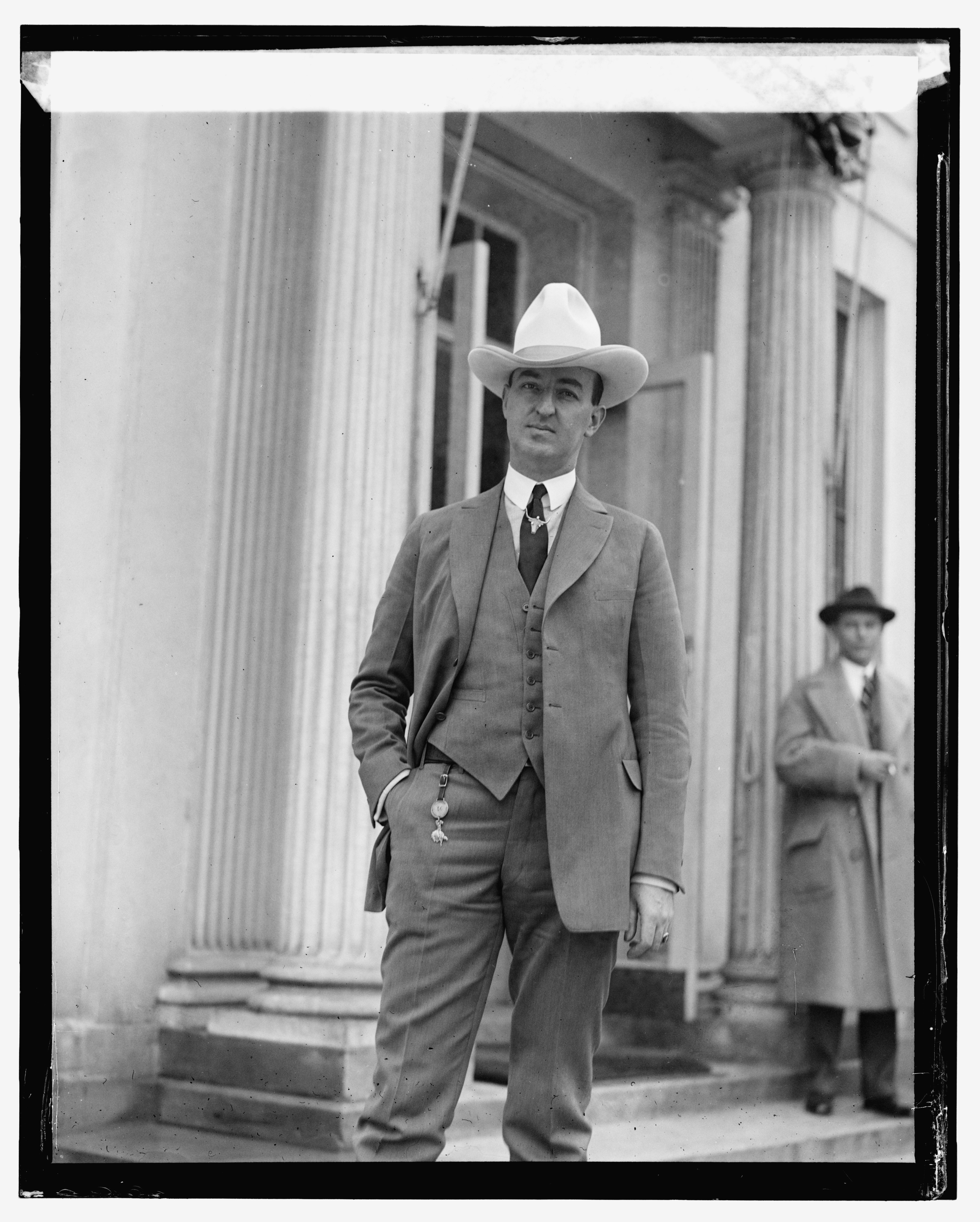
- Austin in 1924
- Born: Clarence Van Nostrand; August 26, 1885; St. Louis, Missouri, U.S.
- Died: October 26, 1938 (aged 53); Santa Fe, New Mexico, U.S.
- Other names: King of the Rodeo; Daddy of the Rodeo
- Occupation: Rodeo promoter
- Years active: 1918–1938
- Spouse: Mary Lou McGuire

John Van "Tex" Austin (August 26, 1885 – 26 October 1938) was an American rodeo promoter, known as the "King of the Rodeo" or "Daddy of the Rodeo" because of his efforts to popularize the rodeo outside of its core American West demographic.

He owned the Forked Lightning Ranch in New Mexico. From 1925 to 1929, he was promoter, manager, and director of the Chicago Roundup. In 1976, he was inducted into the Rodeo Hall of Fame of the National Cowboy Hall of Fame.

== Biography ==
Austin's birth name, in St. Louis, Missouri, was Clarence Van Nostrand. In 1908, he left St. Louis and adopted a new persona, changing his name (and usually was called Tex Austin) and saying that he was raised on a cattle ranch in Victoria, Texas. He worked at the L.F.D. Ranch in Roswell, New Mexico and then at a ranch at Las Vegas, New Mexico.

He claimed to have worked for Don Luis Terrazas, the Chihuahua cattle baron of the Creel-Terrazas Family. In 1910, he was a captain under Francisco Villa in Madero's revolutionary forces against Diaz.

Bulldogging photo of Cowboy Morgan Evans at the Tex Austin Rodeo in Chicago Stadium (notice Evans has a Western riding boot on his right foot and a low quarter shoe on his left for quick competition dismount)

His first produced rodeo was in El Paso, Texas. In 1918 in Wichita, Kansas, he produced the first indoor rodeo. In the 1920s, Austin put together rodeos in the Chicago Stadium, New York's Madison Square Garden (1922), and in Hollywood.

He took his rodeo to the newly opened Wembley Stadium in London, in 1924. Austin took to Britain such rodeo stars as: Ike Rude, Manerd Gayler, Andy Lund, Art Lund, Dave Campbell, Rube Roberts, Ted Elder and Vera McGinnis. The rodeo was challenged by animal rights activists attempting to get a court order barring the rodeo on the basis of animal cruelty. The Wembley rodeo, in which Austin lost $20,000, was to cause Parliament to pass the Protection of Animals Act 1934 which made it an offense to rope an untrained animal or to ride one using a cruel appliance such as a strap cinched tight around its genitals. Directly after the rodeo in Wembley Stadium, Austin produced a rodeo in Dublin, Ireland, held in Croke Park.

Tex Austin returned to London with his rodeo in 1934 where cowboys and cowgirls performed in the White City stadium before the king and queen. Bronc riders including Herman Linder, Frank Sharp, Weldon Bascom, Clark Lund and Pete Knight rode in the 1934 London rodeo. The featured bucking horse of the show was the legendary Midnight. "Suicide" Ted Elder was a contestant in the trick riding competition and also a contract performer jumping his horses over on automobile.

== New Mexico ==
In the early 1920s, he was involved with the Vermejo Park Ranch guest ranch.

In 1925, he bought land in the old 5,500-acre (22 km^{2}) Pecos Pueblo Grant for a guest ranch called Forked Lightning Ranch. The main ranch house was one of the first works of John Gaw Meem. The ranch is now part of the Pecos National Historic Park. Austin would hold cattle drives between the ranch and Las Vegas, New Mexico, recruiting city folk back east to participate in the drives. The ranch was later owned by Buddy Fogelson and the actress Greer Garson.

After losing the ranch in the Great Depression, Austin retired to Santa Fe with his wife Mary Lou McGuire of Albuquerque. They opened a restaurant in Santa Fe called "Tex Austin's Los Rancheros".

He committed suicide in 1938, a few weeks after getting a diagnosis that he was going blind. He died of carbon monoxide inhalation while he was in his car at his home. Photographs of his rodeo days were found stacked on the couch of his home.

== Legacy ==
He was inducted into the Rodeo Hall of Fame of the National Cowboy Hall of Fame in 1976.
