= Trick roping =

Spinning of a lasso in Western arts

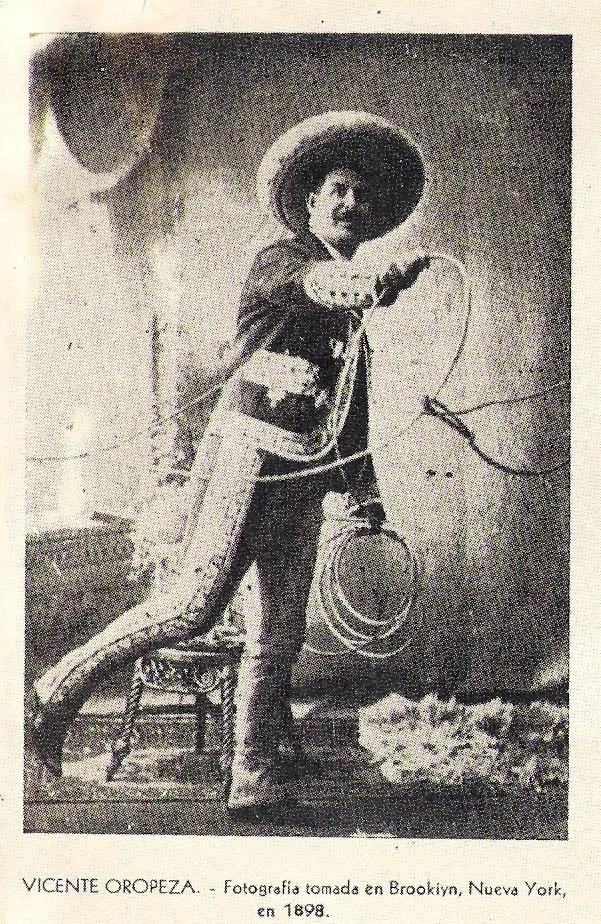
Vicente Oropeza, Mexican charro, introduced trick roping to the United States while working for Buffalo Bill's Wild West show.

Floreo de reata or trick roping is a Mexican entertainment or competitive art involving the spinning of a lasso, also known as a lariat or a rope. Besides Mexico and Mexican charrería, it is also associated with Wild West shows or Western arts in the United States.

The lasso is a well-known tool of Mexican vaqueros, who developed rope spinning and throwing skills in using lassos to catch animals. Mexican vaqueros developed various tricks to show off their prowess with the lasso and demonstrations of these tricks evolved into entertainment and competitive disciplines.

== Etymology ==
Floreo de Reata comes from floreo meaning "flowering" or "flourishing" and reata from Mexican Spanish meaning rope, specifically the one used for capturing cattle and other livestock. It translates to as "reata flowering" or "reata flourishing", making intricate shapes with the lasso.

== History ==
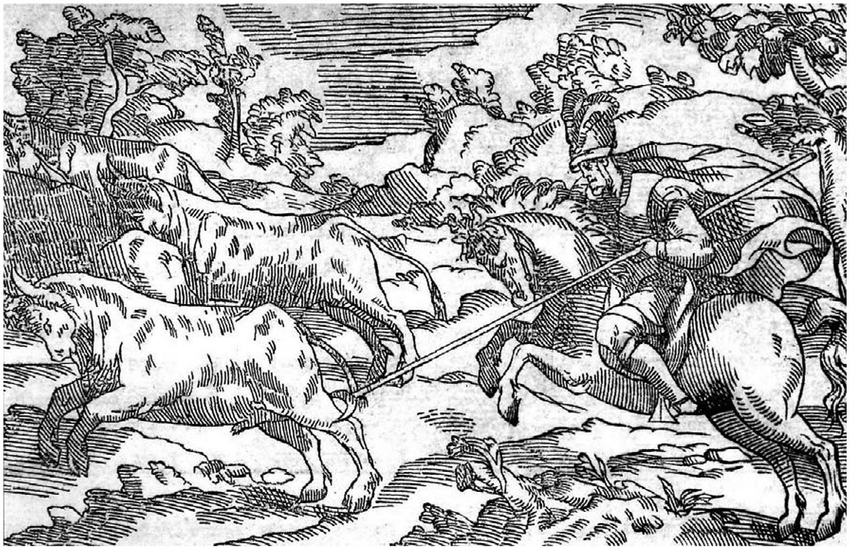
Hunting Wild Bulls with the desjarretadera in Colonial Mexico, 1582

Before the development of roping, the original tool of the early cowherds (vaqueros) of the Americas was the desjarretadera, a lance with a crescent moon shaped blade at one of its ends used to incapacitate cattle by cutting their hocks or hamstrings. Known in English as a "hocking knife", "desjarretadera" comes from the Spanish prefix "des-" meaning "to remove", and "jarrete" meaning "hock" (dehocker); it was also known as a "lanza de media luna" or "crescent-moon blade lance", or simply "luna" (moon). A vaquero on horseback, carrying the desjarretadera, would gallop at full speed behind a wild bull and, positioning himself slightly to one side, would hit the back, the hock, of one of its legs, slicing through the flesh and cutting the nerves, thus, incapacitating the bull. The vaquero would then dismount and finish the bull off by stabbing it at the base of its neck, and would then skin it and remove the tallow, leaving the rest to rot.

Towards the 18th century, cattle roping was widely spread throughout Hispanic America, from the Pampas of South America to the northern frontier of New Spain. In this time, roping was still in its infancy, it was straightforward and rudimentary. It was generally done in conjunction with the desjarretadera and lance. Much of what is known as roping today didn't exist, including in Mexico where methods such as "team-roping" or "heeling" from horseback hadn't been developed yet. The rope was simply thrown with no technique and no effect, while the loop or noose didn't have the necessary flare to remain opened.

=== Early stages ===
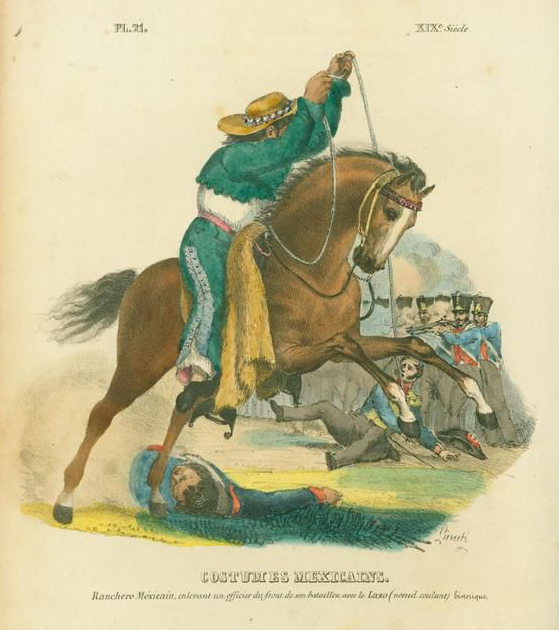
Mexican Charro roping a royalist officer during Mexico's War for Independence

The earliest roots of Floreo de Reata or "Trick Roping" date back to when roping in Mexico began to divert from the rest of Hispanic-America between the late 18th and early 19th centuries, when Charros in western Mexico began to experiment with the lasso giving it more effect. The first documented evidence is from an 1813 posthumous trial by the Spanish Inquisition against a Charro from Nueva Galicia named Juan Chávez who was accused of having made a pact with the devil for handling the lasso in "magical" ways. Juan Chávez was a vaquero who was said to have had a special talent for roping without ever hurting an animal. During the Mexican War of Independence he joined the forces of Don Miguel Hidalgo in Guadalajara and fought in the Battle of Calderón Bridge where he would die in battle. According to the trial, Don Juan threw the rope with such ease that sometimes he made it turn once or twice around him without the lasso closing, a singular and unique way never before seen that the Church attributed to him having a pact with the devil.

There are a few theories as to why Mexicans were able to create a more developed and intricate form of roping and ultimately "trick roping", as opposed to the South Americans who rope in a more simple way. The most known being the invention of the saddle-horn which facilitates roping from horseback by providing more stability and security for the rider, specially when roping heavier animals. Securing the rope on the saddle-horn, by winding it around it, the rider can easily gauge the speed and strength of the beast, and if there is any danger of him being knocked over he can easily let go of the rope. Even if the rider ties the rope to the saddle-horn instead of winding it, he can still manage by cutting the rope as the saddle-horn is in easy reach, right in front. Thanks to this invention, the Charros can do all of their roping from horseback, enabling them to innovate different throws suited to each situation.

Another, less well known reason is that by the early 19th century, both, lances and desjarretaderas were no longer used in Mexico for herding cattle. This change originally came from a series of rules and ordinances that were instituted in certain regions and haciendas to promote, both, the conservation and the increase of the cattle herds. One such set of rules were implemented in 1807 in Nueva Galicia, the largest cattle ranching region in New Spain, by the Count of Miravalle, Don Pedro Trebuesto, who, among other things, ordered that tools such as lances were to no longer be allowed to herd cattle and, instead, to just use lassos alone because lances would cause so many injuries and damages to the cattle that many ended up dying. The only areas in Mexico where the desjarretadera continued to be used well into the mid 19th century were the northernmost territories that would become the U.S. Southwest such as California.

It is believed that this specific rule combined with the use of a saddle-horn had an early impact on the way that Mexican vaqueros handled roping. No longer constrained by the simultaneous use of lances or desjarretaderas, the Mexicans could now develop and hone their roping even further by experimenting with the lasso, creating new techniques, innovating not only how they threw it but also how it landed on the target animal, prioritizing its effectiveness and the well being of the cattle as well as their showmanship.

In contrast, South American vaqueros were hampered in their ability to develop a more advanced form of roping by various factors. For one, they continued using desjarretaderas and lances well into the 19th century, as the business of tallow and hides were still important. In addition to this, most of the saddles they used lacked a saddle-horn which restricted their ability to rope from horseback. Vaqueros such as the Gauchos, secure their lassos on the cinch underneath their saddles, limiting their stability and security, and forcing them to rely on people on foot to subdue the targeted animal; Gauchos were also hindered by the fact that bolas was their primary tool, while lassos were secondary.

=== 19th Century ===
By the 1840s, the Mexican method of roping was well established in most of the country . The method was divided into three basic elements:

Lazar: The lassoing of either the horns or head of the bull, or the head of a horse. It can be done on horseback or on foot.

Manganear: The roping of the front legs, fore-footing, of the animal. It can be done on horseback or on foot. There are various mangana loops that can be thrown, each with distinct names. Some manganas can also be thrown as piales (heel shots).

Pialar: The roping of the hind legs, heeling, of the animal. Just like manganas, piales can be done on horseback or on foot, and each pial loop has distinct names. Some piales were developed strictly for heeling, but some can be thrown as manganas.

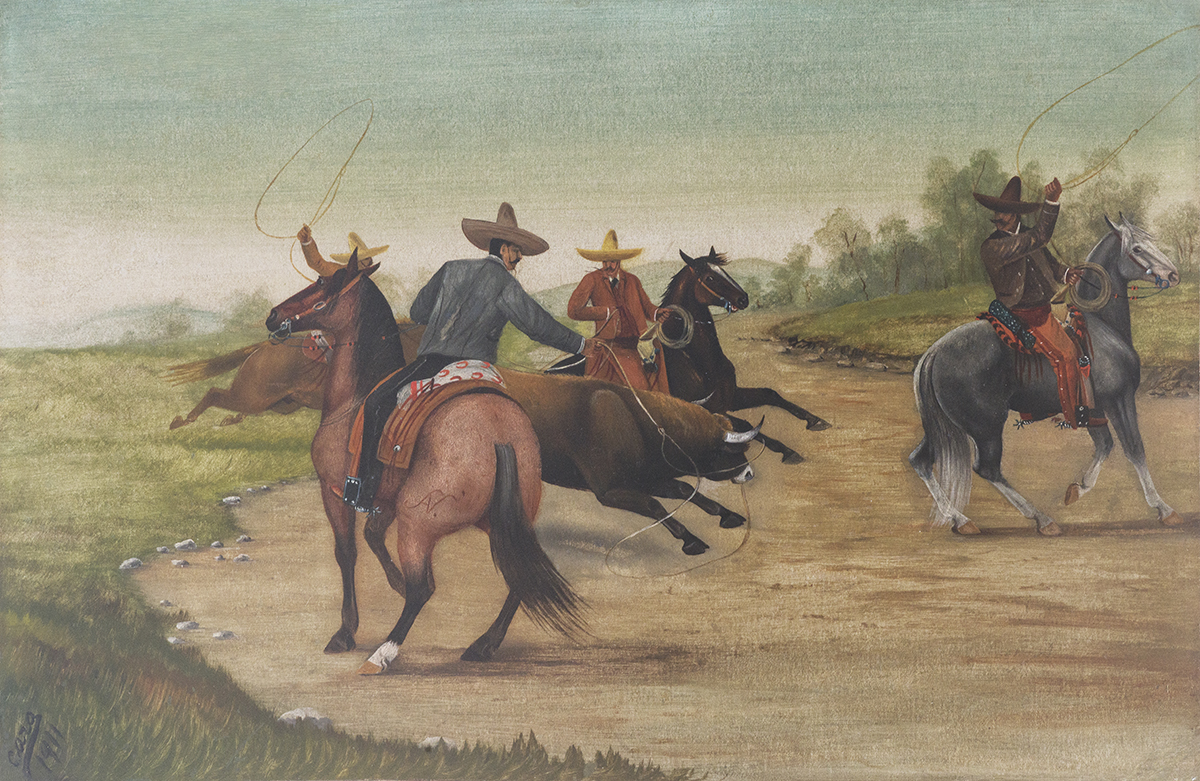
A Charro throws a mangana or fore-footing loop to capture a bull (1911).

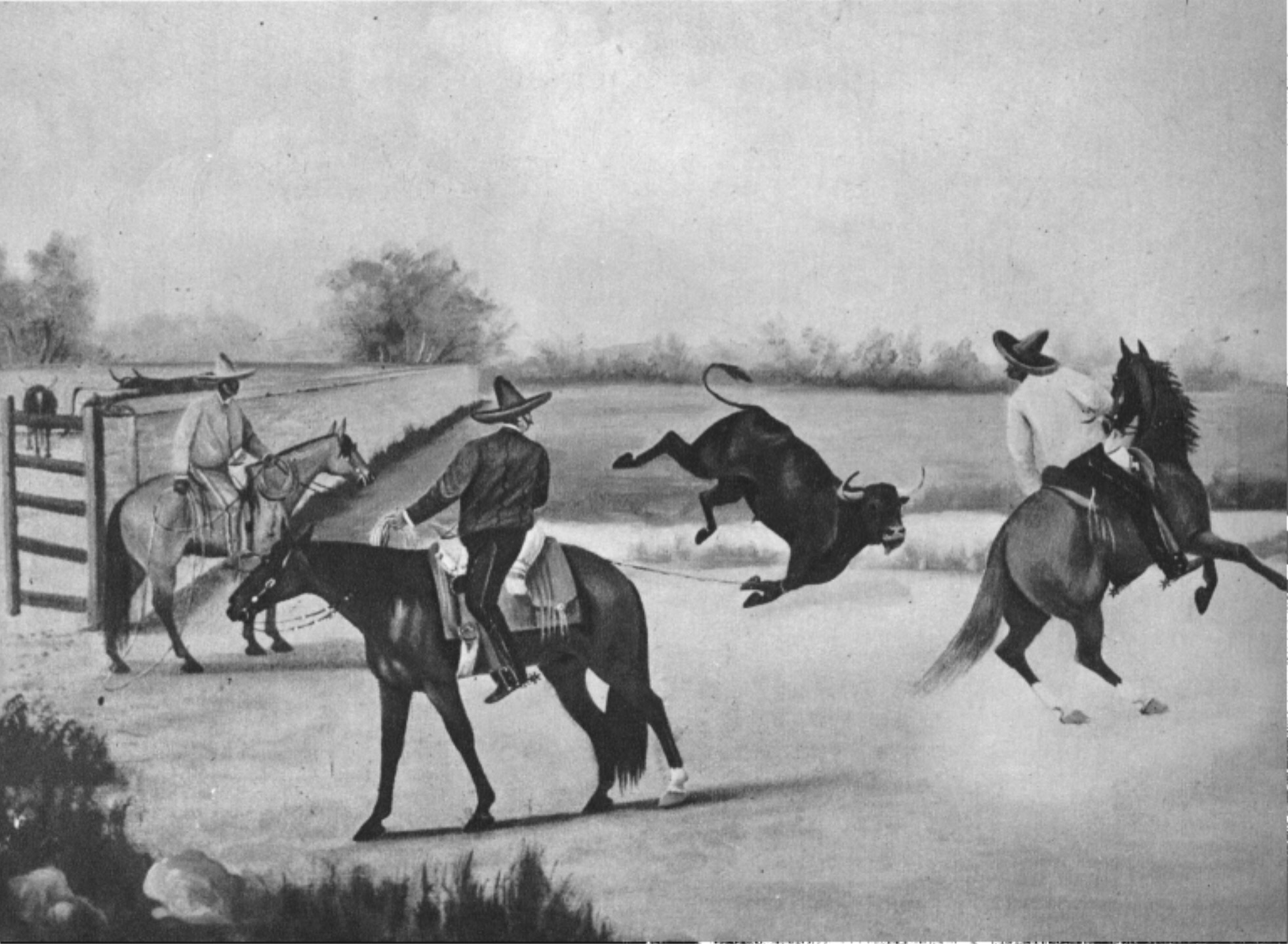
Charro executing a mangana, roping the forelegs of a bull

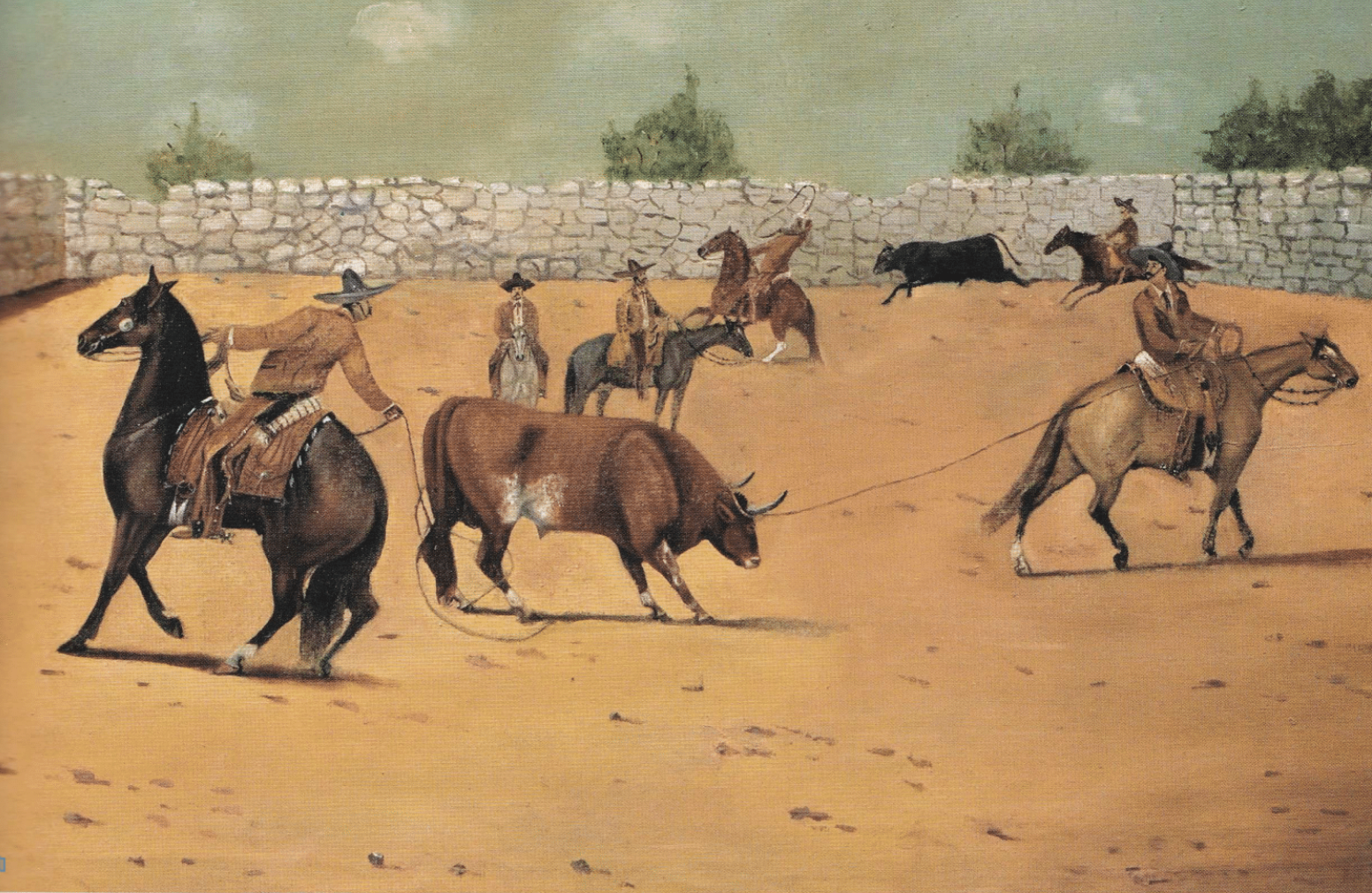
Heeling (pialar) while team roping a bull

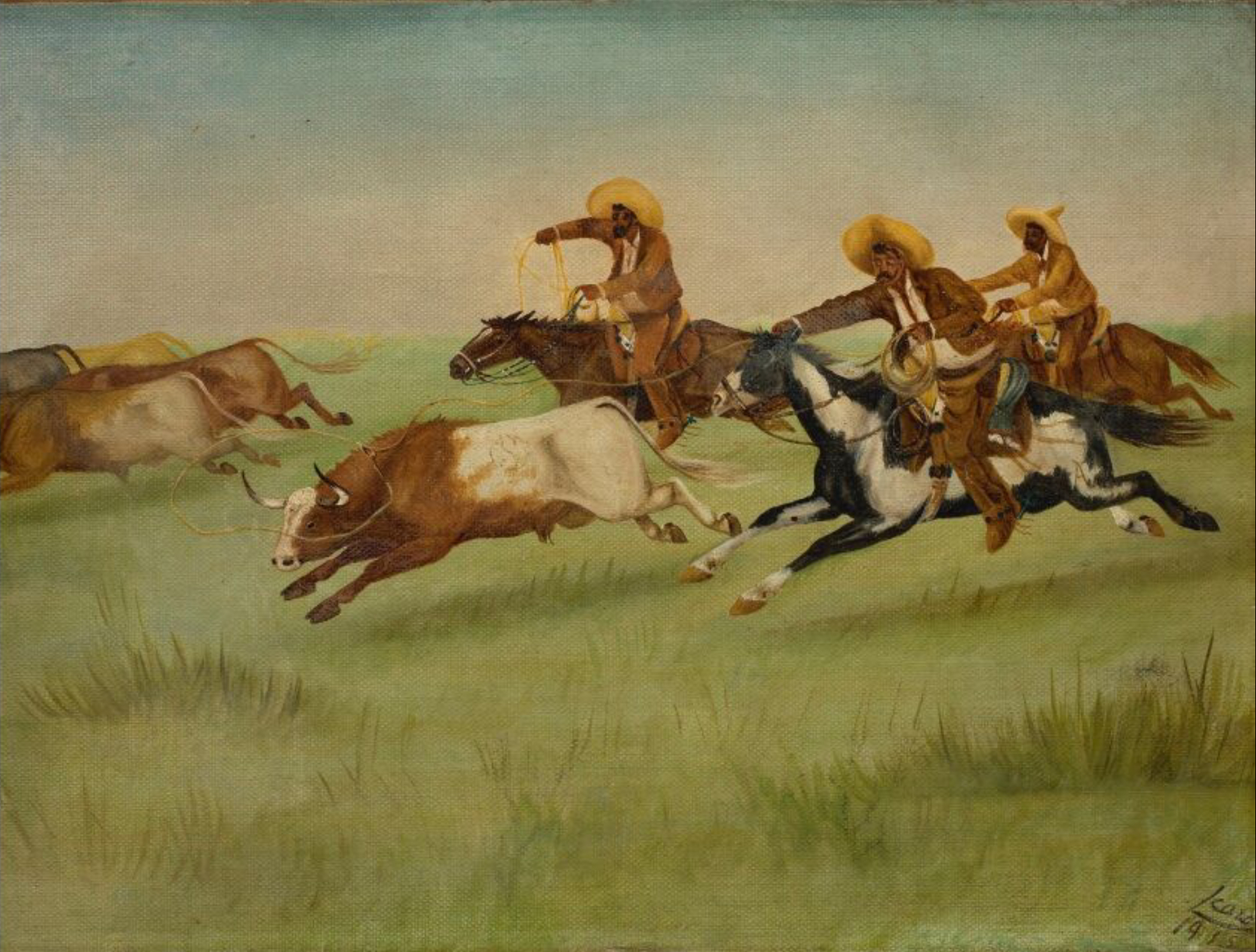
Lassoing or roping a bull by the horns

Charros developed different ways to throw the rope in any direction, from above, from below, from right to left, from behind, in front or in opposite direction, giving it the right twist and effect to achieve the perfect size loop, whether a mangana or pial, to capture a bull or horse in any specific situation.

Floreo de Reata or "Trick Roping", therefore, is nothing more than a set of roping shots and lasso loops, manganas and piales, used for the purpose of roping and capturing cattle and horses, presented in rapid succession for artistic and showmanship purposes.

The first manganas and piales "floreados", that is, the first fancy or tricked out roping shots were "La Crinolina" (the crinoline), "La Contracrinolina" (the counter-crinoline) and the pial "La Caricia" (the caress), invented by the great ropers: Jesús, Felipe and Ignacio González Aragón, members of the great González Aragón family, a family of Charros who worked as vaqueros in the famous Hacienda San José Acolman, outside of Mexico City, herding and tending fighting bulls, and who went on to revolutionized roping.

Fighting bulls, together with the invention of the saddle-horn and the banning of desjarretaderas and lances, are an integral part in the development of Mexican roping, in particular, trick-roping. Fighting bulls are distinct from regular cattle as they're more ferocious and usually attack when they feel threatened. Charros who worked as vaqueros in haciendas that raised fighting bulls, were more skilled at roping, because they had to be more agile, all while dodging the incoming bulls. This was exacerbated by the fact that in Mexico, fencing the land was banned and cattle were raised freely in the wild with little to no intervention from men, contrary to how cattle raising was done in Spain where the herds were smaller and with constant care usually within the confines of a corral or dehesa. This fact had an impact on the further development of trick-roping and Mexican style bull-fighting in the latter 19th century.

The 19th century bullfighting historian, writer and journalist, José Sánchez de Neira, in the advent of Mexican style bull-fighting or Jaripeo, explained why Mexicans were far better horsemen than Spaniards, stating:

"Bullfighting is what we do in Spain, and bullfighting is also what is done in Mexico. The highest degree of possible perfection predominates among our people—nowadays, more than ever—in the feats performed on foot, while that remote country has a head start on us in those performed on horseback. This is not because there is a lack of good riders and brave horsemen here, nor because in Mexico there is a lack of men of valor and agility who would do on foot what many of our people do, but because the need to initially attend to hunting cattle for their livelihood, the profit that this active exercise later provided to commerce, the enjoyment and pleasure that hunting provides when it presents dangers, have made the inhabitants of that country true specialists in the art of jineta (Note: An Arab or African riding method in which the rider rode with shorter stirrups, with his legs bent, allowing the rider a more direct and precise contact of the "lower aids" with the horse's sides, sitting firmly in the center of the saddle, keeping the feet firmly resting on the stirrups; it was the typical riding method of light cavalry. This form of riding was introduced to Spain by the Moors, and the Spaniards introduced it to Mexico in the 16th century where it was refined and perfected gaining greater prominence, acquiring a distinct “New World” style and form.) horsemanship. [...] From this stems that country's fondness for the Jaripeo, which is, let's say, the playing with wild cattle, and from this comes Mexican bullfighting."

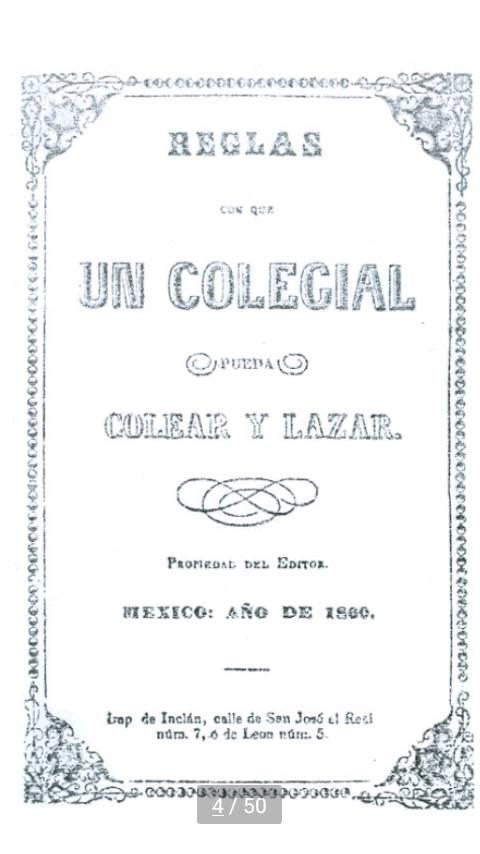
Front cover of Reglas con que un Colegial pueda Colear y Lazar", the first roping manual, by Luis G. Inclán (1860)

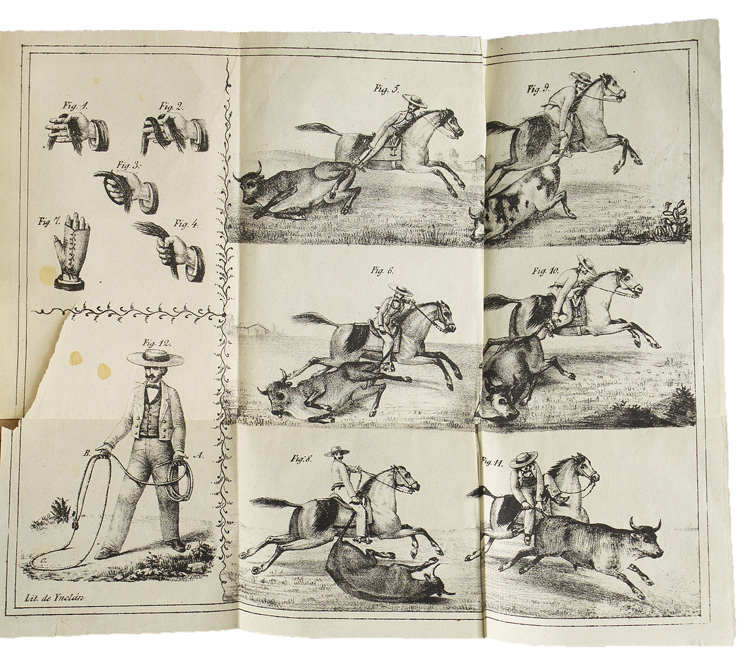
Lithographs from "Reglas con que un Colegial pueda Colear y Lazar", the first roping manual, by Luis G. Inclán (1860)

The first Mexican manual for roping, titled "Reglas con que un Colegial pueda Colear y Lazar" (Rules by which a Beginner can learn Bull-Tailing and Roping), was written and published by Luis G. Inclán in 1860. In the manual, Inclán, a writer who had worked as a vaquero in his younger life in Central Mexico, teaches bull-tailing (knocking down a bull by the tail) and roping. He describes the different techniques to achieve the right effect when throwing the lasso; how to rope the legs of the targeted animal in any direction, from above, from below, from right to left, from behind, in front or in opposite direction. He describes the 19 mangana loops known at the time: La Vieja/Siempreviva, La Salvadora, La Aguja, La Revolución, La Canasta, La Cangreja, La Polka en Fuga, La Aguja, La Contribución, La Crinolina, La Polka Común, La Espina, La Aurora, El Plan de Ayutla, La Reaccionaria, La Prusiana or Polka por Arriba, La Tapatia, La Infalible, and La Taravilla. He explains, in detail, how to execute each one, for example:

- La Vieja or Siempreviva (The old one or the everlasting): The oldest and simplest mangana. It's executed by throwing the lasso, in a straightforward way, right in front of the forelegs of the animal, about a quarter of a distance, trying to keep it as open as possible, covering from the chest down without the rope whipping at the knees, and at the moment you see the forelegs enter, you raise your arm upwards, tightening the rope to tie and stretch them, an operation which will be done as quickly as possible.
- La Salvadora (The Saviour one): It's applied when the animal is fleeing, and without the need to give any effect to the lasso, it is thrown by only giving it a half-turn, it can be executed in any direction, trying to throw it as if whipping the animal's chest, because although the lasso does not land completely open, upright, or flat on the ground, it is always effective even if it lands haphazardly.
- La Aguja (The Needle): For this, the lasso is swung backwards, in the opposite direction, front to back, and it's thrown towards the back of the rider, over the horse's haunch, falling to the left side, lying in front of the front animal's forelegs. To wind the rope on the saddle-horn, it's essential to violently turn the arm with the rope, to undo the reverse turn that was made.
- La Revolución (The Revolution): With the horse intersecting the path, looking to where the animal is coming from, the lasso is thrown as "La Aguja", towards the back, swinging it backwards, and when the lasso has been thrown, it's given the opposite effect, so that while in the air it spins two or three time counterclockwise, securing the forelegs during the last spin.
- La Canasta (The Basket): With the horse facing forward, throw the lasso without swinging, making sure that the rope remains extended in the air, giving it momentum so that it continually forms a circle without closing, as the animal steps into the loop, putting its forelegs in.
- La Cangreja (The Crab): This is applied when the animal runs from right to left, by throwing the lasso towards the back, for which the horse is turned with its rump facing the ring or arena, the lasso is swung backwards, front to back, and it is thrown naturally so that lands upright in front of the forelegs.
- La Taravilla: A figure 8 loop. It's executed without swinging, the lasso loop stretched out behind the roper, having given it the opposite effect, forming a true oval beforehand, landing crossed.

During the French Intervention in Mexico (1862-1867), Charros, fighting on the republican side as guerrilla fighters, would use their roping skills to battle the French and the imperialist side, using roping shots such as "La Crinolina". In a compilation of letters and newspaper articles written during the war, one relates the following:

"A lasso (the national weapon of Mexico, according to the French) flies through the air, forming an elegant crinoline, swoops down on the general's gray horse, and when he sees the lasso coming and capture his body, he wants to cut the rope or urge the horse to go on faster and escape, but there is no time left: he is caught by the waist and yanked out of the saddle, thrown off his horse and dragged along the ground, and all he can see is a great cloud of dust, the one left by Taboada's horse, and a charro dressed in deerskin clothing who quickly winds the reata on the saddle-horn, while others shout at him: - Good lasso!"

=== The final stage: Jaripeo ===
Equestrian and bull fighting sports have existed in Mexico, in some form or another, since at least the 16th century, with most beginning to take shape as we know them today around the 18th century, with sports such as "coleo" (bull tailing), bull-riding, or roping. These sports originated from the style of ranching that had developed in Mexico. Throughout much of Mexico's history, these sports had remained mostly in the countryside, being carried out on the open range or in small arenas, very seldomly appearing in the arenas of major cities mostly as secondary events.

As a result of the French Intervention in Mexico in the 1860s, there was a new sense of patriotism and nationalism throughout the country, where both the government and the public pushed the idea of "lo nacional" or "everything Mexican" over anything "foreign". This included Mexican equestrian and "bullfighting" traditions over those from Spain and Europe. Ironically, it was Emperor Maximilian I of Mexico who, during the French Intervention, promoted and exalted such Mexican traditions as he was a great admirer of Mexican horsemanship, often having exhibitions of roping, bull-riding and other events in the Palace where he would invite foreign dignitaries, and would often dress as a Charro even in formal events.

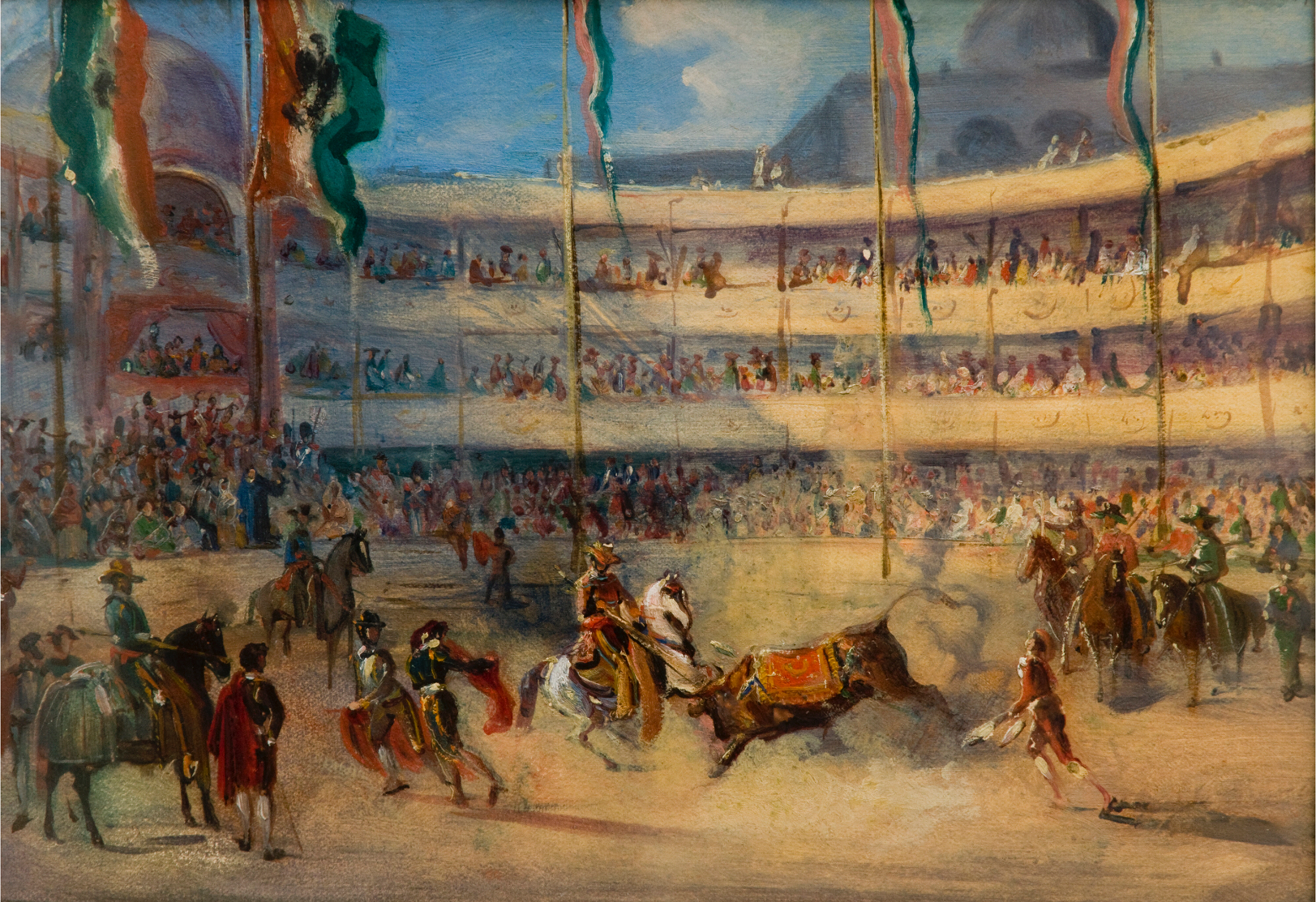
Bullfight in Mexico City (1831), where the picadors, bullfighters on horseback, are dressed as Charros, that is, like the vaqueros from the Hinterland.

Up until the 1860s, the bullfighting scene in Mexico, specifically in the major cities and among the elites, was dominated by Spanish-style bullfighting. In these cases Mexican traditions were relegated and minimized appearing as folkloric additions, auxiliary support, or secondary events. For example, the picadors would often come out dressed as the vaqueros of the interior of the country, the Charros, instead of the Spanish attire. Charros would aid the bullfighter if he was in danger by roping the bull, or if the bull was not a fighter but a "coward" by roping the animal out of the arena. Sometimes the bullfights would often include bull-riding as a secondary event, to liven things up. The only place where people could find Mexican equestrian and vaquero traditions in all their glory would be in the countryside, in the haciendas and ranchos, and villages.

All this would change in the 1870s and 1880s when business and cattlemen promoted Mexican traditions, showcasing Jaripeo, known by the Spaniards as Toreo Mexicano or Mexican style Bull-fighting. Roping, bull-tailing, bull-riding, bull-wrestling, bronco busting, reining and horsemanship skills were elevated to a national level from their humble, countryside, ranching origins. Jaripeo would eventually be called charreria in the 20th century.

The Jaripeo differs from the Spanish style bullfights not only in the exercises and events being performed but in the fact that the bulls are not killed, they are simply "tormented". In Spanish tradition, the killing of the bull is perhaps the most important element because bullfighting emerge from the montería, or big game hunts, carried out by the elites and from Roman blood sports. But Jaripeo originates from activities such as herding, roping, subduing, branding and curing cattle; hunting, roping, subduing and breaking horses; activities that didn't necessarily involve the sacrificing of livestock. Jaripeo is simply the set of equestrian and vaquero skills and exercises arising from the livestock handling traditions turned into sport.

For this reason, Charros put greater emphasis on skill and showmanship, whether in their equestrian skills or in their roping, because that is the ultimate goal of the sport, not the killing of the bull.

Superb Charros, expert ropers, became national heroes, becoming famous not only in Mexico but abroad introducing Mexican traditions to other countries. Charros such as Don Manuel González Aragón, another member of the González Aragón family, son of Ignacio González Aragón, born in Hacienda de San José Acolman. Raised among the fighting bulls, Don Manuel was the inventor of the famous pial (heel shot) "El Viento" or "Del Viento", an artistic pial used for heeling bulls when team roping. The pial "Del Viento" was later introduced to the United States when Don Manuel toured there between 1888 and 1893 for bull fighting and roping exhibitions, and it's known today by buckaroos as the "Del Viento hip shot" or "Del Viento loop", although Americans use it on calves and steers.

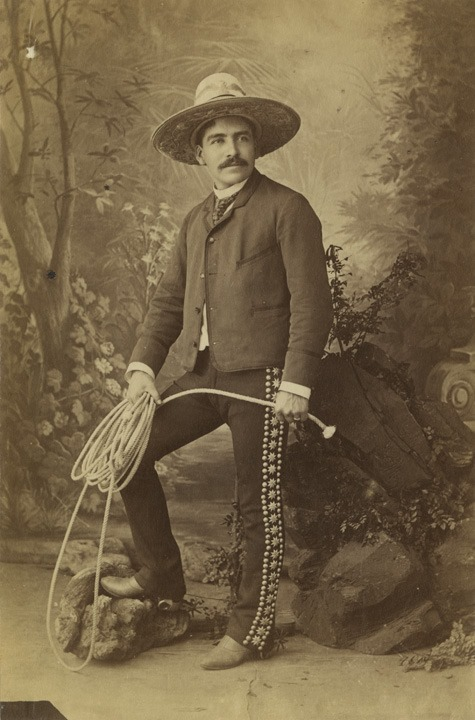
Ponciano Diaz (1889)

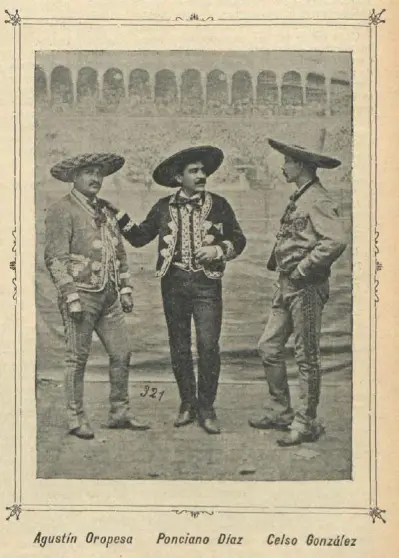
Ponciano Diaz, Agustin Oropeza (brother of Vicente Oropeza) and Celso González (1897)

The most famous and renowned of the Charro bull-fighting ropers of this era was Ponciano Díaz, an expert roper born in 1856 in the famous Atenco Hacienda, the oldest operating cattle ranch in the world founded in 1528 for the raising of fighting bulls. He was the son of Guadalupe Albino Díaz González, the Caporal (captain of the vaqueros) of the hacienda. Ponciano worked as a vaquero in the hacienda as a teenager, learning from his father. He debuted as a bullfighter in 1877.

Ponciano Díaz was a superstar, he was so famous and had such a cultural impact that songs and poems were written about him. In 1889, he together with Celso Gonzalez and Agustin Oropeza, brother of Vicente Oropeza, the charro who introduced trick roping to the United States, traveled to Spain where they would triumph in the bullrings of Madrid, introducing Mexican vaquero traditions, regularly fighting in Charro attire. Mexican newspapers lauded Ponciano's triumph in Europe and claimed that he had bathed Mexico with glory, stating that he had Conquered Spain. On their return, thousands were waiting for them in the port of Veracruz to welcome them with fanfare.

=== Introduction to the United States ===
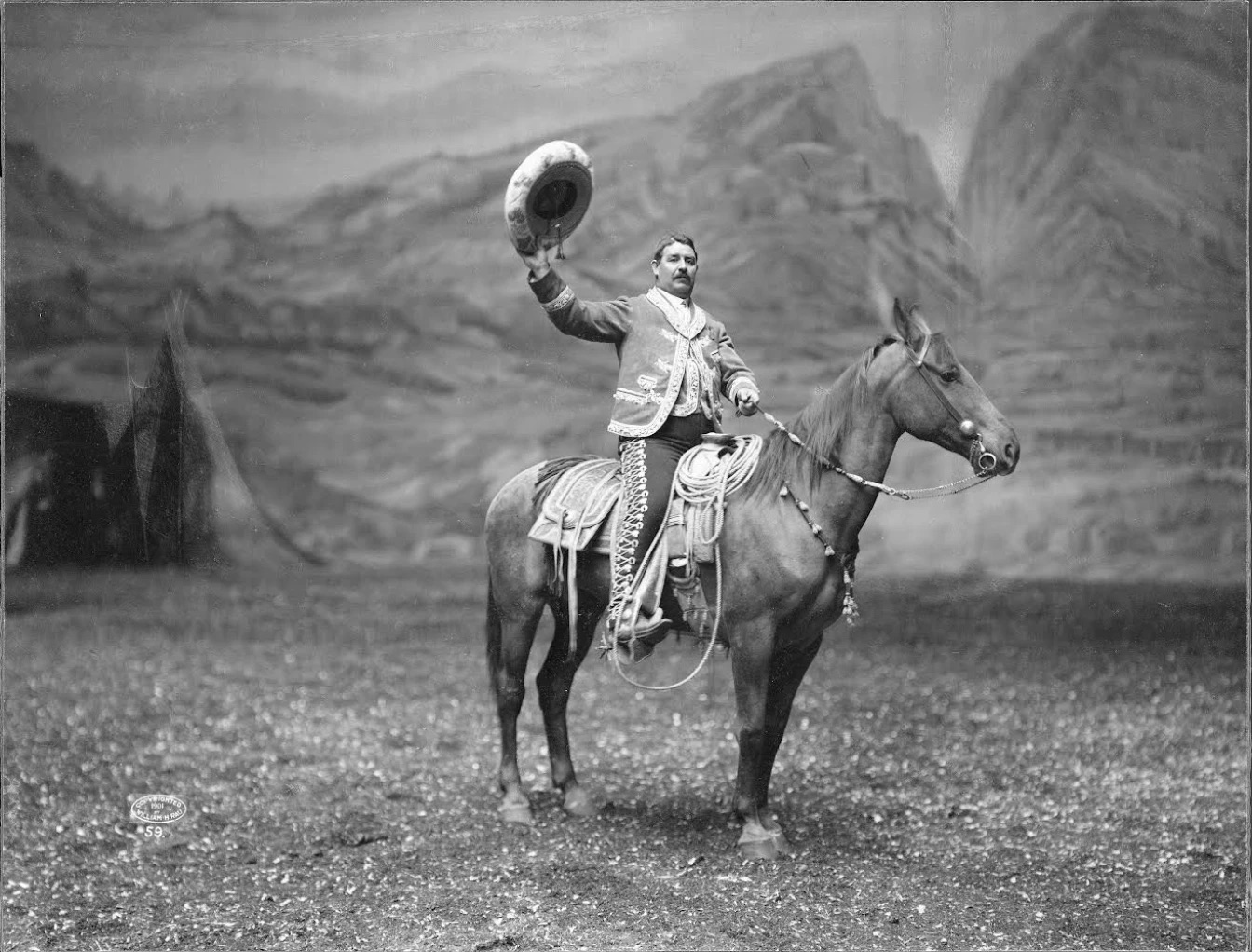
Vicente Oropeza in Buffalo Bill's Wild West show

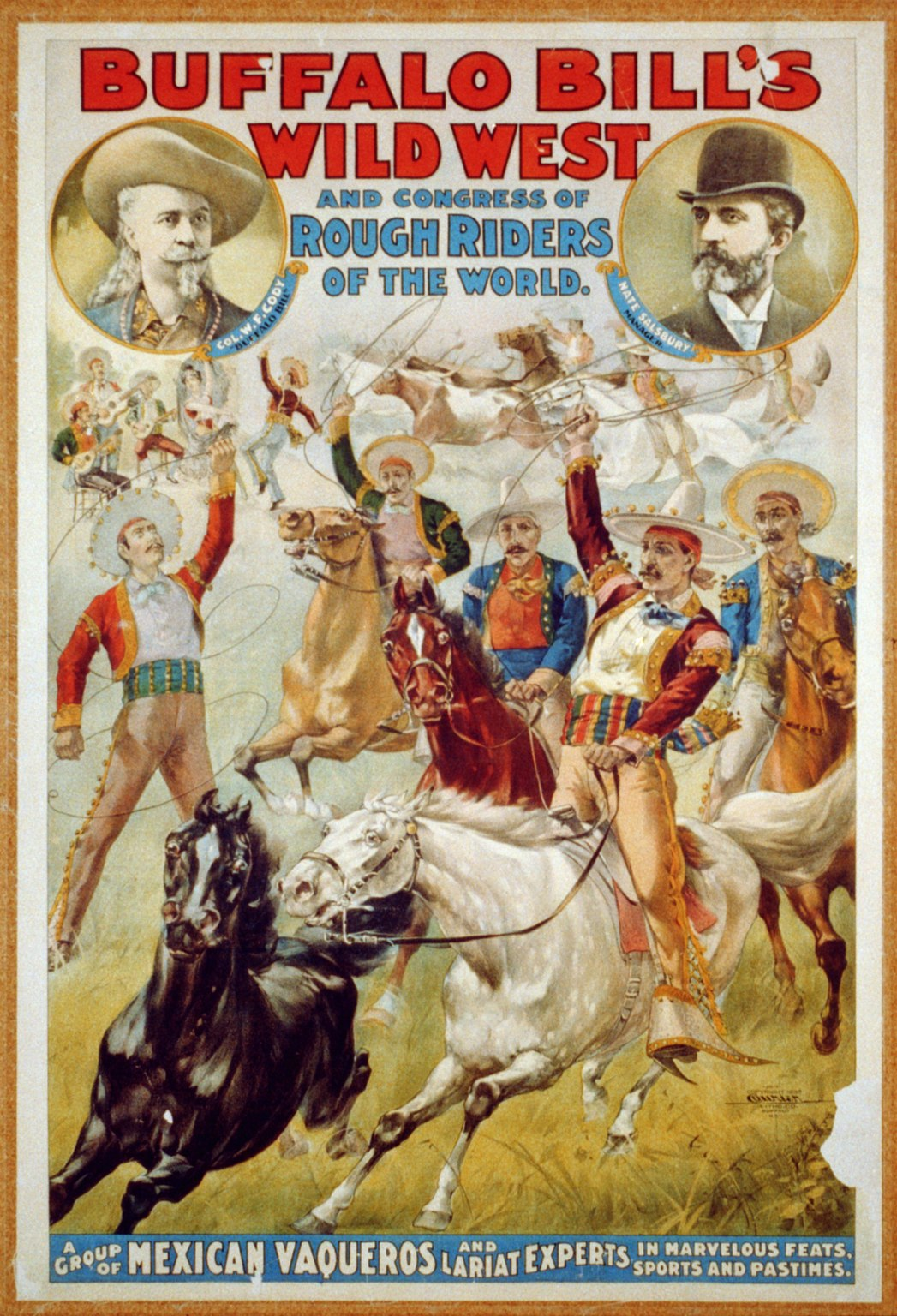
Mexican Vaqueros and "Lariat" Experts in Buffalo Bill's Wild West Show

Certain Mexican traditions had been introduced to Americans when the latter began to move west, to the lands previously under Mexican rule, but most were introduced in the latter half of the 19th century, receiving greater diffusion thanks to American Wild West shows such as Buffalo Bill's Wild West or Pawnee Bill's Historic Wild West.

Floreo de Reata or Trick Roping itself was introduced to American audiences via Buffalo Bill's Wild West show by a Charro from Puebla named Vicente Oropeza, brother of the famous Charro Agustin Oropeza who had gained fame for fighting on the republican side during the French Intervention and for being part of Ponciano Diaz' Charro team that had traveled to Spain in 1889.

Born and raised in a large Hacienda in Puebla in 1858, Oropeza learned his skills working as a vaquero in the hacienda handling fighting bulls. His first appearance in the United States was in July 1891. In 1893 (some sources say 1894), a group of 12 Charros, including Don Manuel Gonzalez Aragon, led by Vicente Oropeza met in the city of Monterrey and went on a tour of several cities in the United States and performed with Buffalo Bill's show in New York. Vicente Oropeza and his troupe would work with Buffalo Bill for the next 16 years.

Vicente Oropeza would be declared "Champion of the World" in 1900.

In 1893, at the age of 13, Will Rogers traveled with his family to the Chicago World's Fair where he attended Buffalo Bill's Wild West show and witnessed Vicente Oropeza's roping feats, and credited him for inspiring his trick roping.

=== Well-known trick ropers include ===
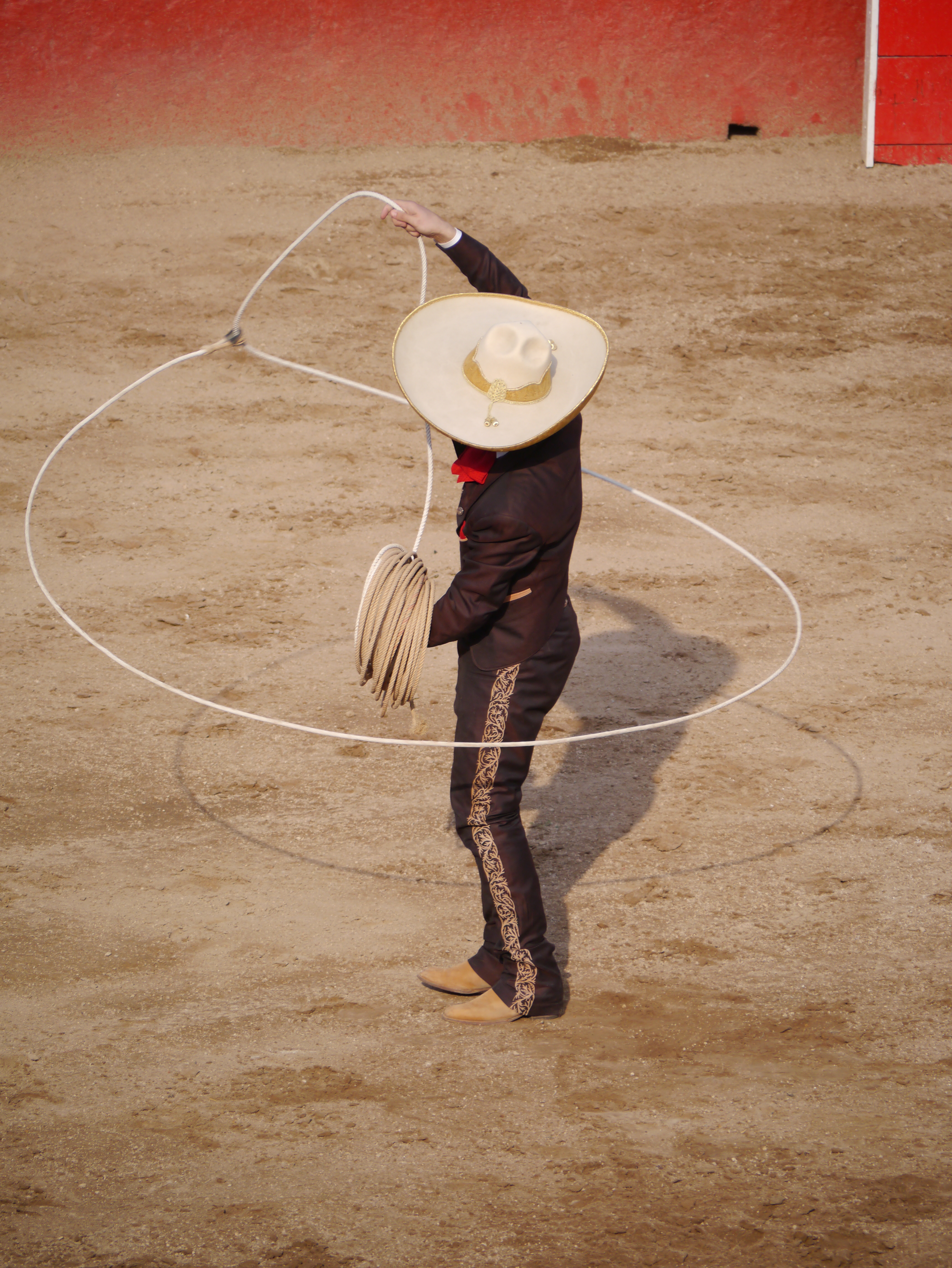
A charro demonstrating trick roping, circa 2013

- Vicente Oropeza was the Mexican charro that introduced the Mexican art of trick roping to the United States. He was posthumously inducted into the National Cowboy and Western Heritage Museum Hall of Fame.
- Texas Jack Omohundro was the first performer to introduce roping acts to the American stage.
- Texas Rose Bascom was of Cherokee Choctaw ancestry billed as the "Queen of the Trick Ropers," appeared in Hollywood movies, toured the world with the Bob Hope Troupe, Roy Rogers and Dale Evans, and Montie Montana, inducted into the National Cowgirl Hall of Fame.

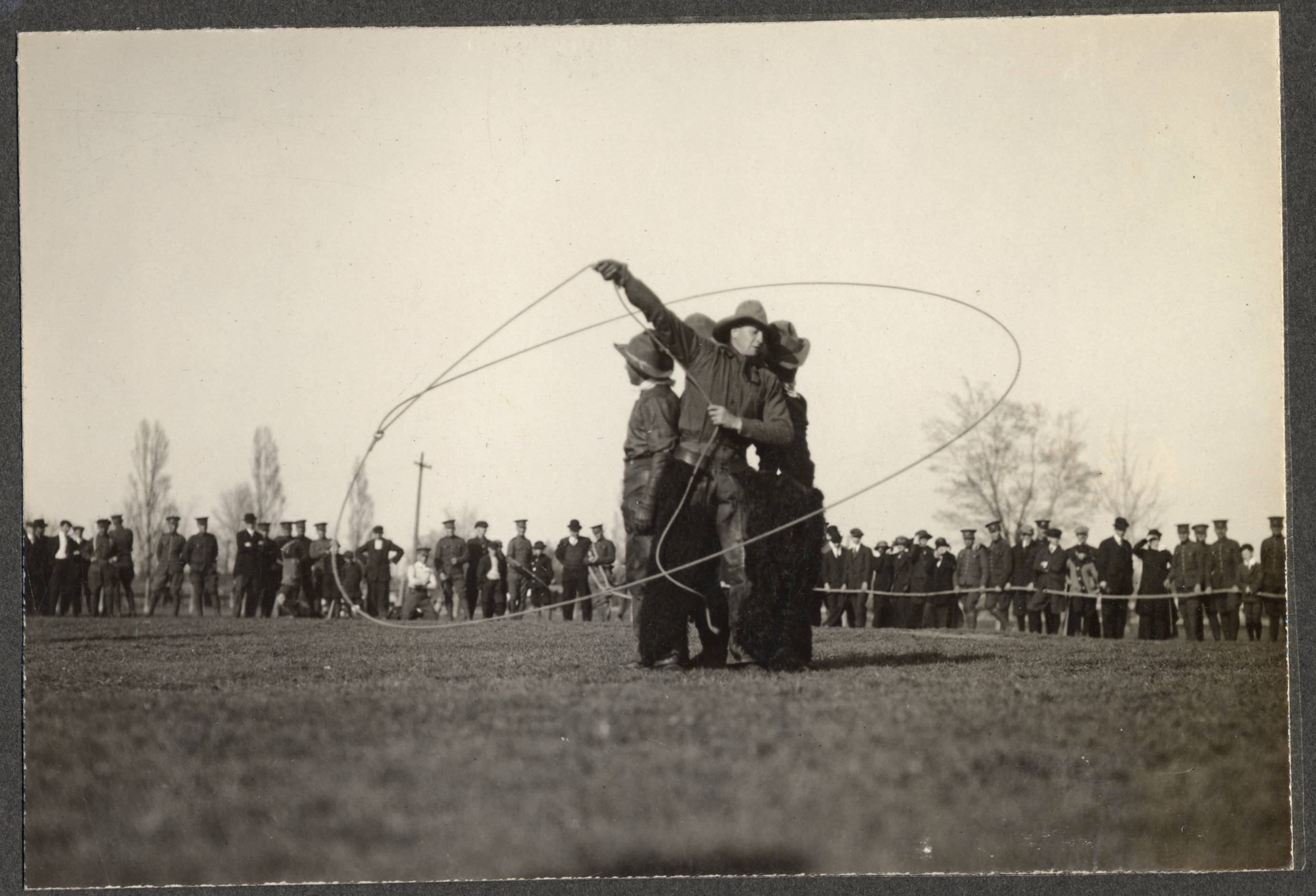
Trick roping, circa 1914

- Montie Montana had a 60-year career as a trick roper, and appeared in several John Wayne movies.
- Actor and humorist Will Rogers, known for his roles as a cowboy, was an expert at trick roping. Rogers' rope tricks were showcased in the 1922 silent film The Ropin' Fool. He credited Mexican Charro Vicente Oropeza for inspiring him to become a trick roper, and called Oropeza the greatest trick roper ever.
- Vince Bruce (April 4, 1955 – September 24, 2011) was internationally acclaimed as one of the best Western acts in the world; Bruce made his Broadway debut in 1991, in the Tony Award-winning musical The Will Rogers Follies — A Life in Revue. Appearing as the trick-roping star and portraying Rogers in this tribute to the cowboy and vaudeville star, Bruce remained with the show for two and a half years at New York's Palace Theatre. For his act, he performed a spin with two ropes, a feat first devised 60 years earlier by Will Rogers himself. On July 21, 1991, at the Empire State Building, Vince set a new world record—4,011—for "Texas Skips".
- Flores LaDue (1883–1951) was the only cowgirl to claim three world championships for trick and fancy roping; Flores remained undefeated in the event. Flores and her husband, Guy Weadick, also a trick roper, organized and produced the first Calgary Stampede. Flores Ladue is reputed to have been the first trick roper to perform the Texas Skip.
- Horse trainer Buck Brannaman began his career in a child trick roping act with his brother.
- The English troupe known as El Granadas, who performed at the 1946 Royal Variety Performance.

== See also ==
- Bullwhip
- Wild West shows
- Montie Montana
