= Frontier Days (rodeo) =

Rodeo event held by multiple cities

Frontier Days is a common name for a major rodeo event. At least five cities called their annual rodeo "Frontier Days."

== Cities with a "Frontier Days" event ==
- Abbyville, Kansas
- Charlotte, Michigan
- Cheyenne, Wyoming
- Prescott, Arizona
- Arlington Heights, Illinois
- Walla Walla, Washington
- Willits, California

=== Cheyenne Frontier Days ===
Cheyenne Frontier Days, held annually since 1897 in Cheyenne, Wyoming, is the largest rodeo and western celebration in the world. The event, which always occurs in the last week of July, draws over hundreds of thousands of people to the city every year. In 2017, over 241,000 people bought tickets for the rodeo, concerts, and other events.

== Bibliography ==
- Cheyenne Frontier Days 2018 Media Guide (PDF). Cheyenne Frontier Days.
