= Bill Linderman =

American rodeo cowboy (1920–1965)

- Linderman c. 1960s
- Born: William E. Linderman; April 13, 1920; Bridger, Montana, U.S.
- Died: November 11, 1965 (aged 45); Salt Lake City, Utah, U.S.
- Resting place: Livingston, Montana, U.S.

William E. Linderman (April 13, 1920 – November 11, 1965) was an American rodeo cowboy who competed in the Rodeo Cowboys Association (RCA) circuit in the 1940s and 1950s. During his career, he won RCA All-Around Cowboy titles in 1950 and 1953, along with an unofficial All-Around Cowboy championship in 1945; in addition, he earned season championships in rodeo disciplines four times. Linderman was the first cowboy with three RCA world championships in a year, a feat he accomplished in 1950. A native of Montana, he joined the RCA in the early 1940s, winning his first discipline world championship in 1943 before beating out his brother for the 1945 unofficial All-Around Cowboy title. After injuries and health issues ended his 1946 and 1947 seasons, Linderman added two more All-Around Cowboy championships in the next six years.

Beginning in 1947, Linderman worked various jobs for the RCA, including spells as a member of the organization's board of directors, president, and secretary-treasurer. His desire for a season-ending event featuring leaders in the RCA's point standings helped lead to the creation of the National Finals Rodeo. Linderman moved with his family to Washington, and remained with the RCA until his death in a plane accident. He was inducted into the ProRodeo Hall of Fame in 1979.

== Early life ==
Born in Bridger, Montana and raised in Red Lodge, Linderman had six brothers, four of whom were cowboys on professional rodeo tours. At the age of seven, Linderman's father, John H. Linderman, died, and he eventually moved to his stepfather's farm in Belfry. As he became older, he began work as a cowboy for a ranch, in addition to serving as a rock miner. Sources differ on when Linderman joined the RCA; he did so between 1940 and 1942.

== Professional rodeo career ==
In 1943, Linderman won his first world championship in the bareback riding event, and finished third in the All-Around Cowboy standings. Two years later, he won the All-Around title, which was unofficial at the time; his closest competitor was younger brother Bud Linderman. In addition to the All-Around crown, he won the saddle bronc riding world championship that year. In 1946, Linderman attempted to repeat as All-Around Cowboy, and entered the Deadwood, South Dakota rodeo with the lead in the standings. However, as he tried to wrestle a steer, he sustained broken back vertebrae and a broken neck, ending his season. Linderman returned to competition in 1947, only to have an appendectomy prematurely finish his campaign. The next year, Linderman won the all-around championship at the Calgary Stampede rodeo, and added a victory in the saddle bronc discipline.

Linderman claimed three RCA world championships in 1950, becoming the first cowboy to win that many in a season. With over $30,000 in earnings during the year, he won the official All-Around Cowboy championship. He also won his second saddle bronc title and only steer wrestling crown. In 1952, Linderman earned more than $28,000 in RCA events, finishing third in the All-Around Cowboy standings behind Harry Tompkins and Buck Rutherford. The following year, Linderman again won the All-Around Cowboy title, with more than $33,000 in season earnings. In defense of the championship in 1954, he led the standings until mid-August, but fractured his right arm in the Colorado Springs Rodeo while competing in steer wrestling. The injury forced him to limit his schedule to riding events only, and a subsequent injury in Omaha caused him to miss the remainder of the season.

In 1955, Linderman won the all-around championship at the Ellensburg Rodeo, adding victories in the bareback bronc and saddle bronc disciplines. However, he re-injured his right arm three times over the course of the season. The next year, he won all-around, bareback bronc, and steer wrestling championships at the Spokane Rodeo. Linderman repeated his wins in the all-around and steer wrestling categories in the 1957 Spokane Rodeo. In 1959, Linderman retired from competition; estimates of his career earnings range from over $439,000 to over $500,000.

== Other rodeo work ==
From the mid-1940s until his death, Linderman also held various jobs in the rodeo industry. In 1946, after sustaining the injuries that ended his season, he served as a judge for other performers. The RCA gave Linderman a position on its board of directors in 1947, as he was recovering from his appendectomy; he represented bareback bronc riders. At the time, there were multiple rodeo organizations awarding world championships; in addition to the RCA, there was the International Rodeo Association (IRA), which itself was created by a merger of two organizations. Linderman was sent to a November 1948 IRA convention, where he backed the idea of a single champion per event. The IRA stopped calling their season point leaders "champions" in 1955. While on the board, he pushed for the creation of an event to be held at the conclusion of the rodeo season, which would involve the leaders in the standings. His intent was to have the event play a large role in deciding the season's champions, which were determined by season earnings.

In 1951, the RCA made Linderman its president, and he served six terms through 1956. During his time as president, the RCA agreed to a deal with the Girls Rodeo Association (GRA), which mandated that rodeos comprising the RCA's schedule gain sanctioning by the GRA. Linderman's desire for a season-ending event came to fruition in 1959 with the founding of the National Finals Rodeo. He was selected by those in the rodeo community to be arena director at the rodeo. Linderman returned to the RCA in 1962 as secretary-treasurer, holding the position for the remainder of his life.

== Personal life ==
Linderman married Jean Whidden and the couple had a daughter, Charlotte. A few years after Jean's death in 1945, he remarried to Patricia Aber, who had a daughter, Michael. They had one son, Billy. Around 1953, the family relocated from Montana to a ranch in Walla Walla, Washington. In 1959, Linderman purchased a Twin Falls, Idaho cattle ranch; he also acquired land in Gooding, for a residence.

== Death ==
On November 11, 1965, Linderman boarded United Airlines Flight 227 to San Francisco; he was heading to Spokane, Washington, to speak at a Washington Fairs Association conference. Upon reaching Salt Lake City, Utah, the plane crashed short of the runway. The landing gear gave way at impact, leading to a fire which started in the jet's back section. The fire caused the deaths of 41 passengers, including Linderman. Multiple pieces of folklore exist in the rodeo community regarding events surrounding his death. According to one story, Linderman exited the plane after surviving the crash, only to die after returning in an effort to help others still aboard. American Cowboy magazine editor Kendra Santos describes another story, on a visit by Linderman to Denver's Pig ’n' Whistle restaurant hours before the accident, as having "been passed along—cowboy to cowboy". Linderman allegedly cashed a check at the restaurant and was asked for his address, which he is said to have given as "Heaven." He was buried in Livingston, Montana.

== Legacy ==
Nicknamed "The King" by other rodeo performers, Linderman has been honored posthumously on several occasions. In 1966, Rodeo Sports News editor George Williams created the Bill Linderman Memorial Award, which is presented yearly to the leading cowboy with minimum earnings of $1,000 in three events; riding and timed events must both be represented. The RCA had sculptor Bob Scriver build a bronze statue of Linderman, which was placed in Oklahoma City, Oklahoma's Cowboy Hall of Fame in 1969. He had been a member of the Hall since 1966. Linderman was inducted into the ProRodeo Hall of Fame in 1979.

== Honors ==
- 1966 Rodeo Hall of Fame of the National Cowboy and Western Heritage Museum
- 1979 ProRodeo Hall of Fame
- 2001 Ellensburg Rodeo Hall of Fame
- 2006 Cheyenne Frontier Days Hall of Fame (as Linderman Family)
- 2012 Montana Cowboy Hall of Fame
- 2012 Montana Pro Rodeo Hall and Wall of Fame
