= History of rodeo =

History of rodeo tracks the lineage of modern Western rodeo.

== Early history of rodeo in Mexico ==
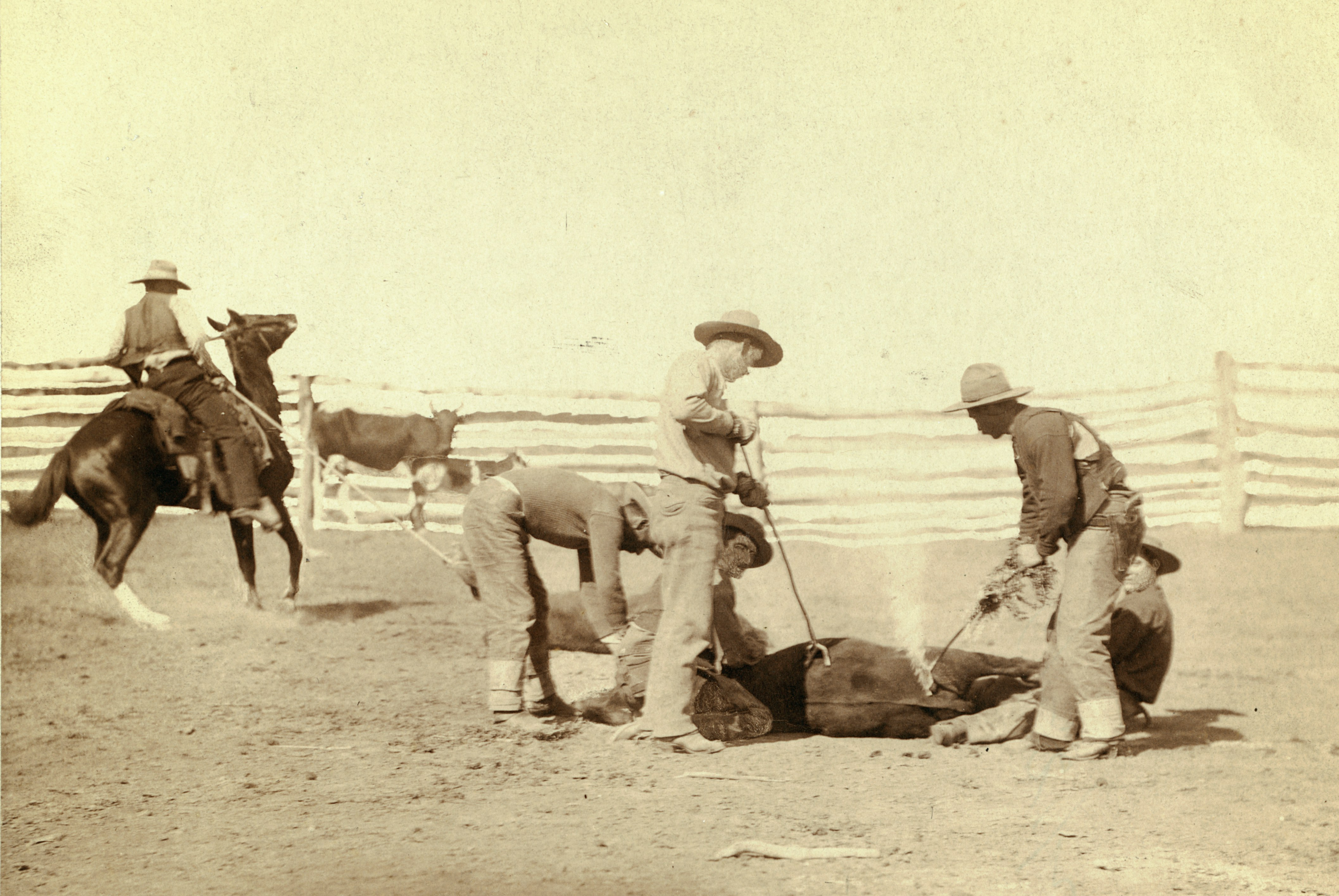
Branding calves, 1888. Many rodeo events were based on the real-life tasks required by cattle ranching.

The rodeo was originally a Mexican procedure that consisted in herding the cattle from the places where they grazed until they were led and concentrated in a specific point which was also called "rodeo" in order for the cattle barons to separate their own from others, count them, brand them and select them, as well as to accustom them to the presence of man, prevent them from becoming too wild and protecting them from rustlers.

The first rodeo ordinance was passed and implemented by Viceroy Luís de Velasco on October 16, 1551, but only for the Toluca Valley and surrounding areas in Central Mexico. Faced with the rapid increase of cattle, the indigenous people who were being affected complained. Viceroy Velasco received the news that the crops of the natives of the towns of the Matlatzinco Valley (today the Valley of Toluca) had been affected by the cattle and ordered that no more animals be kept on the ranch than could be sustained on their own on the granted lands. In turn, he ordered that there be enough vaqueros to carry out periodic rodeos and prevent cattle from invading the crops. The ordinance stated:

"That the owners of the ranches be ordered and be forced to have, with every two thousand cows, one Spanish guard and four Black or Indian Vaqueros, two on horseback and the other two on foot, so that they can collect and round up the said cattle on the ranch one day in each week, under penalty of twenty gold pesos for each time they do not, and find themselves without the said people and guard."

The rodeo was a success because as time went on, the vaqueros, estancieros (ranch managers) and cattle barons noticed that it made ranching and cattle management much easier. They could perform all the necessary work, like branding, on a large portion of the cattle without actually moving the cattle into a corral; it could all be done on site. They could also use the rodeo as a way to sort out the cattle belonging to other cattle barons, as there was no other way to know their owner. By the 1570s the rodeo was used not only to try and tame the cattle, but also to perform all necessary duties such as sorting, branding, curing, castration, and slaughter.

The second rodeo law was passed by Viceroy Martín Enríquez de Almanza for all cattle ranching regions in the country, on January 25, 1574:

"That in each cattle estancia, from the day of San Juan in June until the middle of November of each year, in each week, in the areas and places that by said justice they are commanded and appointed, they be forced to do a rodeo of the cattle and horses. And all the others from the other regional cattle estancias where it would be convenient to make such a rodeo, are forced to come out, and help do the rodeo, so that each one can take out the cattle that bears their brand and take it back to their estancia. As the said rodeo is occurring, by law, between the estancias, under penalty of doing the opposite: being Spanish or mestizo, ten pesos of common gold, applied according to Mesta ordinances; and being black, mulatto, or quadroon, they shall be given a hundred lashes".

The first description of a rodeo was written by Don Juan Suarez de Peralta in his veterinary medicine book Libro de Albeitería written between 1575 and 1580, where he explains to a European audience what a rodeo is and how they are done in the Chichimeca region of Central Mexico:

". . . to take the cattle, they build false corrals towards the area they are fleeing and they gather many men on horseback and using this technique they capture them, and, as I have said few, because there are also tamed horses called corraliegos in great quantity; that there are many who have more than a thousand mares, and the ones who seem to have the least have five hundred, or two hundred, and that is nothing because there is so much cattle that there are men who have 150,000 cows, and having 20,000 is very little, and many are cimarronas [wild and ownerless] and most are rodeo ones, that are so made to it, it is the only way to know how many there are. And these rodeos are done this way: that more than three hundred horsemen of all the cattle barons gather on a specified day, and that land they call Valles is very flat and depopulated of towns where they have to hunt the meek cattle, especially in the San Juan valley in the Chichimecas, who are untamed hostile Indians who have never been conquered, and they do a lot of damage both in killing people and in burning the houses, that over there [Mexico] they call Estancias, where the Vaqueros live and where they have their corrals to enclose some cattle to brand."

Rodeo stresses its western folk hero image and its being a genuinely American creation. But in fact it grew out of the practices of Spanish ranchers and their Mexican ranch hands (vaqueros), a mixture of cattle wrangling and bullfighting that dates back to the sixteenth-century conquistadors.

Bull riding originated with Mexican equestrian contests known as charreadas, wrestling the steer to the ground by riding up behind it, grabbing its tail, and twisting it to the ground. Bull wrestling was part of an ancient tradition throughout the ancient Mediterranean world, including Spain. The ancient Minoans of Crete practiced bull jumping, bull riding, and bull wrestling. Bull wrestling may have been one of the Olympic sporting events of the ancient Greeks.

The events spread throughout the Viceroyalty of New Spain and was found at fairgrounds, racetracks, fiestas, and festivals in nineteenth-century southwestern areas that now comprise the United States. However, unlike the roping, riding, and racing, this contest never attracted a following among Anglo cowboys or audiences. It is, however, a favorite event included in the charreada, the style of rodeo which originated in the Mexican state of Jalisco.

== Early American rodeo ==
There would probably be no steer wrestling at all in American rodeo were it not for a black cowboy from Texas named Bill Pickett who devised his own unique method of bulldogging steers. He jumped from his horse to a steer's back, bit its upper lip, and threw it to the ground by grabbing its horns. He performed at local central Texas fairs and rodeos and was discovered by an agent, who signed him on a tour of the West with his brothers. He received sensational national publicity with his bulldogging exhibition at the 1904 Cheyenne Frontier Days. This brought him a contract with the famous 101 Ranch in Oklahoma and its traveling Wild West exhibitions, where he spent many years performing in the United States and abroad.

Pickett attracted many imitators who appeared at rodeos and Wild West shows, and soon there were enough practitioners for promoters to stage contests. Photographers such as Walter S. Bowman and Ralph R. Doubleday captured images of rodeos and published postcards of the events.

The first woman bulldogger appeared in 1913, when the great champion trick and bronc rider and racer Tillie Baldwin exhibited the feat. However, women's bulldogging contests never materialized. Cowboys did take up the sport with enthusiasm but without the lip-biting, and when rodeo rules were codified, steer wrestling was among the standard contests. Two halls of fame recognize Pickett as the sole inventor of bulldogging, the only rodeo event which can be attributed to a single individual.

Rodeo itself evolved after the Texas Revolution and the U.S.-Mexican War when Anglo cowboys learned the skills, attire, vocabulary, and sports of the vaqueros. Ranch-versus-ranch contests gradually sprang up, as bronc riding, bull riding, and roping contests appeared at race tracks, fairgrounds, and festivals of all kinds. William F. Cody (Buffalo Bill) created the first major rodeo and the first Wild West show in North Platte, Nebraska, in 1882. Following this successful endeavor, Cody organized his touring Wild West show, leaving other entrepreneurs to create what became professional rodeo. Rodeos and Wild West shows enjoyed a parallel existence, employing many of the same stars, while capitalizing on the continuing allure of the mythic West. Women joined the Wild West and contest rodeo circuits in the 1890s and their participation grew as the activities spread geographically. Animal welfare groups began targeting rodeo from the earliest times, and have continued their efforts with varying degrees of success ever since.

The word rodeo was only occasionally used for American cowboy sports until the 1920s, and professional cowboys themselves did not officially adopt the term until 1945. Similarly, there was no attempt to standardize the events needed to make up such sporting contests until 1929. From the 1880s through the 1920s, frontier days, stampedes, and cowboy contests were the most popular names. Cheyenne Frontier Days, which began in 1897, remains the most significant annual community celebration even today. Until 1922, cowboys and cowgirls who won at Cheyenne were considered the world's champions. Until 1912, organization of these community celebrations fell to local citizen committees who selected the events, made the rules, chose officials, arranged for the stock, and handled all other aspects of the festival. Many of these early contests bore more resemblance to Buffalo Bill's Wild West than to contemporary rodeo. While today's Professional Rodeo Cowboys Association (PRCA)-sanctioned rodeos must include five events: calf roping, bareback and saddle bronc riding, bull riding, and steer wrestling, with the option to also hold steer roping and team roping, their Pre-World War I counterparts often offered only two of these contests. The day-long programs included diverse activities including Pony Express races, nightshirt races, and drunken rides. One even featured a football game. Almost all contests were billed as world's championships, causing confusion that endures to this day. Cowboys and cowgirls often did not know the exact events on offer until they arrived on site, and did not learn the rules of competition until they had paid their entry fees.

Before World War II, the most popular rodeo events included trick and fancy roping, trick and fancy riding, and racing. Trick and fancy roping contestants had to make figures and shapes with their lassos before releasing them to capture one or several persons or animals. These skills had to be exhibited on foot and on horseback. Fancy roping was the event most closely identified with the vaqueros, who invented it. In trick and fancy riding, athletes performed gymnastic feats on horseback while circling the arena at top speed. Athletes in these events were judged, much like those in contemporary gymnastics. The most popular races included Roman standing races wherein riders stood with one foot on the back of each of a pair of horses, and relays in which riders changed horses after each lap of the arena. Both were extremely dangerous, and sometimes fatal.

Another great difference between these colorful contests and their modern counterparts was that there were no chutes or gates, and no time limits. Rough stock were blindfolded and snubbed in the center of the arenas where the riders mounted. The animals were then set free. In the vast arenas, which usually included a racetrack, rides often lasted more than 10 minutes, and sometimes the contestants vanished from view of the audience.

During this era, women rode broncs and bulls and roped steers. They also competed in a variety of races, as well as trick and fancy roping and riding. In all of these contests, they often competed against men and won. Hispanics, blacks and Native Americans also participated in significant numbers. In some places, Native Americans were invited to set up camp on the grounds, perform dances and other activities for the audience, and participate in contests designated solely for them. Some rodeos did discriminate against one or more of these groups, but most were open to anyone who could pay the entry fee.

All this began to change in 1912, when a group of Calgary businessmen hired American roper Guy Weadick to manage, promote, and produce his first Stampede. Weadick selected the events, determined rules and eligibility, chose the officials, and invited well-known cowboys and cowgirls to take part. He hoped to pit the best Canadian hands against those of the US and Mexico, but Mexican participation was severely limited by the civil unrest in that country. Nonetheless, the Stampede was a huge success, and Weadick followed with the Winnipeg Stampede of 1913, and much less successful New York Stampede of 1916. Although Weadick's last production, the 1919 Calgary Stampede, was only a minor success, he led the way for a new era in which powerful producers, not local committees, would dominate rodeo and greatly expand its audience.

Rodeo enjoyed enormous popularity in New York, Chicago, Boston, and Philadelphia, as well as in London, Europe, Cuba, South America, and the Far East in the 1920s and 1930s. Today, none of those venues is viable. Despite numerous tours abroad before World War II, rodeo is really significant only in North America. While it does exist in Australia and New Zealand, top athletes from those countries come to America to seek their fortunes. Some Latin American countries have contests called rodeos but these have none of the events found in the North American version.

The rodeo was not originally a sporting event, but an integral part of cattle-ranching in areas of Spanish influence. The working rodeo was retained in parts of the US Southwest even after the US-Mexico War. In fact, it was important enough to merit legal status in California:

"An Act to Regulate Rodeos (April 3, 1851)...Every owner of a stock farm shall be obliged to give, yearly, one general Rodeo, within the limits of his farm, from the first day of April until the thirty-first day of July, in the counties of San Luis Obispo, Santa Barbara, and San Diego; and in the remaining counties, from the first day of March until the thirty-first day of August...in order that parties interested may meet, for the purpose of separating their respective cattle."

One of these businesslike rodeos held in 1858, in old Los Angeles County is described by Harris Newmark:

The third week in February witnessed one of the most interesting gatherings of rancheros characteristic of Southern California life I have ever seen. It was a typical rodeo, lasting two or three days, for the separating and regrouping of cattle and horses, and took place at the residence of William Workman at La Puente rancho. Strictly speaking, the rodeo continued but two days, or less; for, inasmuch as the cattle to be sorted and branded had to be deprived for the time being of their customary nourishment, the work was necessarily one of dispatch. Under the direction of a Judge of the Plains—on this occasion, the polished cavalier, Don Felipe Lugo—they were examined, parted and branded, or re-branded, with hot irons impressing a mark (generally a letter or odd monogram) duly registered at the Court House and protected by the County Recorder's certificate. Never have I seen finer horsemanship than was there displayed by those whose task it was to pursue the animal and throw the lasso around the head or leg; and as often as most of those present had probably seen the feat performed, great was their enthusiasm when each vaquero brought down his victim. Among the guests were most of the rancheros of wealth and note, together with their attendants, all of whom made up a company ready to enjoy the unlimited hospitality for which the Workmans were so renowned.

Aside from the business in hand of disposing of such an enormous number of mixed-up cattle in so short a time, what made the occasion one of keen delight was the remarkable, almost astounding ability of the horseman in controlling his animal; for lassoing cattle was not his only forte. The vaquero of early days was a clever rider and handler of horses, particularly the bronco—so often erroneously spelled broncho—sometimes a mustang, sometimes an Indian pony. Out of a drove that had never been saddled, he would lasso one, attach a halter to his neck and blindfold him by means of a strap some two or three inches in width fastened to the halter; after which he would suddenly mount the bronco and remove the blind, when the horse, unaccustomed to discipline or restraint, would buck and kick for over a quarter of a mile, and then stop only because of exhaustion. With seldom a mishap, however, the vaquero almost invariably broke the mustang to the saddle within three or four days. This little Mexican horse, while perhaps not so graceful as his American brother, was noted for endurance; and he could lope from morning till night, if necessary, without evidence of serious fatigue.

Speaking of this dexterity, I may add that now and then the early Californian vaquero gave a good exhibition of his prowess in the town itself. Runaways, due in part to the absence of hitching posts but frequently to carelessness, occurred daily; and sometimes a clever horseman who happened to be near would pursue, overtake and lasso the frightened steed before serious harm had been done.

== Rodeo after World War I ==
World War I nearly killed rodeo, but three men and two organizations brought it back to greater prominence, not in the West where it was born, but in the big cities of the East. Tex Austin created the Madison Square Garden Rodeo in 1922. It immediately became the premier event. Overshadowing Cheyenne Frontier Days, its winners were thereafter recognized as the unofficial world champions. In 1924, Austin produced the London Rodeo at Wembley Stadium, universally acknowledged as the most successful international contest in rodeo history. However, despite his triumphs, Austin lost control of the Madison Square Garden contest, and his influence dwindled. A Texan, Col. William T. Johnson, took over the Garden Rodeo. He soon began producing rodeos in other eastern indoor arenas, which forever changed the nature of the sport. There was no room indoors for races, and time constraints limited the number of events that could be included. Rodeos no longer lasted all day as they did under the western sky. Nonetheless, Johnson was a major figure in modernizing and professionalizing the sport. He also enabled big-time rodeo to thrive during the Great Depression. Prior to WWI, cowboys and cowgirls could not earn a living on rodeo winnings alone. Most were also Wild West show performers, and exhibition or "contract acts" at rodeos. The top names could appear in vaudeville in the off-season. Others found whatever jobs they could. But with the advent of the producers, and the expansion of the eastern circuit, rodeo gradually became a lucrative career for the best contestants, even as Wild West shows diminished and vanished. During the depths of the Depression, the rodeo publication Hoofs and Horns, estimated the average cowboy's earnings at $2,000–$3,000 annually. This placed them well above teachers, and near or above dentists in income. A few superstars earned far more.

By 1934, every rodeo that Johnson produced had set attendance records. A typical Johnson rodeo featured sixteen events, of which six were contests: cowboys bareback and saddle bronc riding, cowgirl bronc riding, cowboys steer riding, steer wrestling, and calf roping. Steer riding has now become bull riding, but other than that, Johnson's cowboy contests are the same as those mandated by the PRCA today. On the other hand, entertainment features such as basketball games on horseback and horseback quadrilles have largely disappeared.

In 1929 two events occurred which split rodeo down the geographic middle: superstar cowgirl Bonnie McCarroll died as a result of a bronc riding accident at Pendleton, Oregon. Her death caused many western rodeos to drop women's contests. That same year, western rodeo producers formed the Rodeo Association of America (RAA) in an attempt to bring order to the chaotic sport. Largely as a result of McCarroll's death, the RAA was organized as an all-male entity. Despite pleas to do so, they refused to include any women's contests. The RAA hoped to standardize rules and events, and eliminate the unscrupulous promoters who threatened the integrity of the sport. The RAA also set out to determine the "true world's champion cowboys," based on a system of points derived from money won in their sanctioned rodeos. This remains the basic system used today, but the dream of having only one "world's champion" would not be realized for decades.

If not for the McCarroll tragedy, the rest of rodeo history might have been very different. It is unlikely there would ever have been a need for the WPRA, and barrel racing would probably not exist. Eastern producers aligned themselves with Johnson, who ignored the RAA, and continued to include lucrative cowgirl contests at their rodeos. But that was short-lived. The cowboys hated Johnson, whom they felt distributed prize money unfairly, and mostly to himself, while treating them with disdain. In 1936, they went on strike at his Boston Garden rodeo, demanding a bigger share of the gate as prize money. Garden management finally forced Johnson to relent, and the jubilant cowboys formed the Cowboys Turtle Association (CTA), which is now the powerful PRCA. A defeated Johnson sold his company and retired, never again to be seen or heard from in the rodeo business. Like the RAA, the CTA sanctioned no women's contests. The original board of the CTA included some of the top cowboys in the business: Hugh Bennett, Everett Bowman, Bob Crosby, Herman Linder, and Pete Knight. The CTA and RAA had a long and contentious relationship, but the cowboys ultimately prevailed.

Meantime, in 1931, promoters of the Stamford Cowboy Reunion invited all local ranches to send a young woman at least sixteen years old to compete in a Sponsor Contest designed "to add femininity to the all-male rodeo". The women were judged on who had the best horse, the most attractive outfit, and on horsemanship as they rode a cloverleaf pattern around three barrels. The contest was a huge success, and was widely copied.

In 1939, Johnson's replacement at Madison Square Garden, Everett Colburn, invited a group of Texas Sponsor Girls to appear at his rodeo as a publicity stunt. A second group appeared at the 1940 rodeo. It featured Hollywood singing cowboy Gene Autry, and the women rode while he sang "Home on the Range." It was a tradition that continued for decades. Soon thereafter, Autry formed a rodeo company and took over not only Madison Square Garden, but also Boston Garden and most of the other major rodeos from coast-to-coast. One of his first actions was to discontinue the cowgirl bronc riding contest, which had been a highlight of the Madison Square Garden Rodeo since its inception in 1922. There was nothing left for cowgirls but the invitation-only sponsor girl event. Because of Autry, real cowgirl contests disappeared from rodeos nationwide. Sponsor contests are the genesis of barrel racing, which is today the premier women's rodeo event. However, Autry's influence was far more vast and long-lasting. His popularity was such that producers nationwide found they could no longer attract a crowd without a western singer to headline their rodeos. Still today, rodeo is the only professional sport in which the athletes are not the featured performers. Autry is also credited with keeping the sport alive during World War II, thanks to his business acumen, and the heavily patriotic themes that permeated his productions.

== Rodeo after World War II ==
Following the War, a merged CTA and RAA became the PRCA, and took complete control of the sport. Men like Austin, Johnson, and Autry could no longer wield the power they previously maintained. Consequently, the Madison Square Garden rodeo lost its luster, and the PRCA established the National Finals Rodeo (NFR) to determine for the next half century who were the true world's champion cowboys. In forming their organization, cowboys were decades ahead of athletes in other professional sports. By 1953, the first year for which such information is available, the total prize money available at PRCA rodeos was $9,491,856. Thirty years later, the figure had risen to just over $13 million. As prize money rose, of course, so did individual earnings. In 1976, Tom Ferguson, competing in all four timed events, became the first cowboy to exceed $100,000 winnings in a single year. Only six years later, that figure was surpassed by a single-event contestant. Bareback bronc rider Bruce Ford amassed $101,351 before the NFR. In 2006, all contestants coming into the NFR as leading money-winners in their events had earned at least $100,000, except team ropers, who had a little over $90,000 apiece. When the NFR began in 1959, the total purse was $50,000. As of 2007, the figure is $5,375,000.

However, the PRCA benefited primarily white males, as the diverse groups who had once competed in rodeo were largely absent from the arena. Native Americans now have their own rodeo organization, and have shown little interest in PRCA activities. Records give no indication of institutional racism on the part of the PRCA, although anecdotal evidence suggests that individual rodeo committees sometimes did discriminate against African Americans and Hispanics in the fifties and sixties. Nonetheless, black and Hispanic cowboys have won the PRCA world's championships, with Leo Camarillo taking the team roping title five times, and earning fifteen consecutive trips to the NFR.

Women realized it would be up to them to get back into the mainstream of the sport. Following a successful all-girl rodeo, many of the participants met in 1948 to form what is now the Women's Professional Rodeo Association (WPRA). The organization aimed to provide women the opportunity to compete in legitimate, sanctioned contests at PRCA rodeos and in rough stock and roping events at all-girl rodeos. While prize money from all-girl rodeos never provided participants with enough money to meet expenses, the WPRA was highly successful in restoring cowgirl contests to PRCA rodeos. Barrel racing was the most popular WPRA contest and it spread rapidly throughout the country. In 1955, PRCA president Bill Linderman and WPRA president Jackie Worthington signed an historic agreement that remained in effect for half a century. It urged the inclusion of WPRA barrel racing at PRCA rodeos, and required that women's events at PRCA rodeos conform to WPRA rules and regulations. Following a lengthy campaign, barrel racing was added to the NFR in 1968.

Although the barrel race was in the NFR, cowgirls' prize money was far below that of cowboys. The gender equity movement led the WPRA in 1980 to send an ultimatum to 650 rodeo committees nationwide that if prizes were not equal by 1985, the WPRA would not participate. There was almost universal compliance, except for the NFR. The WPRA obtained corporate sponsors to increase their NFR purse to that of the team ropers, the lowest-paid cowboy participants, whose already small purse had to be split between the two team members. At the 1997 NFR, cowboys and cowgirls led by team roper Matt Tyler threatened to strike unless they received equal prize money. This cooperative effort resulted in successful negotiations. Since 1998, the NFR has paid equal money to all participants. The additional funding comes from the sale of special luxury seats.

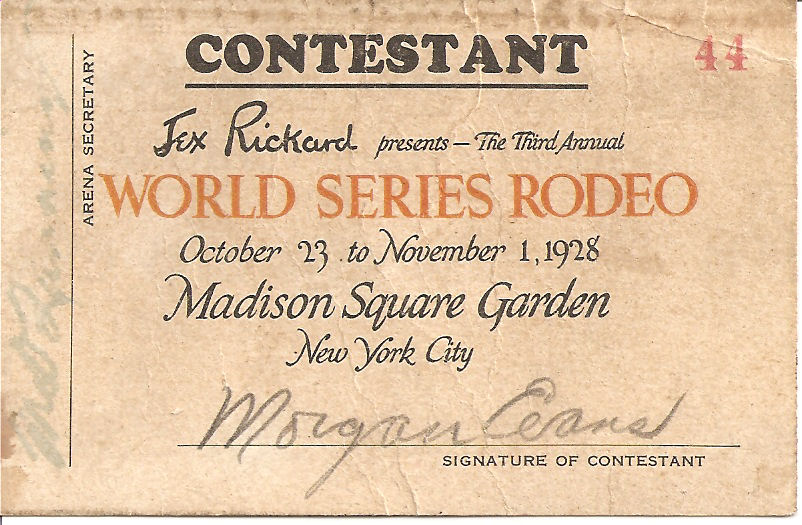
Second Annual 1928 World Series Rodeo (Steer wrestling Champ 1927) Contestant ticket

Bulldogging photo of Cowboy Morgan Evans at the Tex Austin rodeo in Chicago (note that Cowboy Evans has a Western riding boot on his right foot and a low quarter shoe on his left for quick competition dismount.)

In 1923, Tex Austin hired the New Yankee Stadium for 10 days and intended to offer $50,000 in prize money, double of what was offered at the previous Madison Square Garden rodeo the year prior. Tickets for the event were between $2–3. Tex Austin planned to pay the cowboys 100 cents on the dollar. Events offered were bronc riding, bulldogging, calf roping, trick and fancy riding, steer riding, relay race and the cowgirls' bronc riding. Famous bad horses Mystery, Nose Dive, P.J. Nutt and Peaceful Henry were at the contest in the prior year. Riders included Mike Hastings, Mabel Strickland, Roy Quick, Ike Rude, Powder River Thompson, Bonnie McCarroll and Bonnie Gray, as well as many others.

== Formation of rodeo associations ==
In 1929 the Rodeo Association of America (RAA) was formed, bringing promoters and managers together. It compiled scores from rodeo events at the 50-some rodeos across North America including Cheyenne, Wyoming; Pendleton, Oregon; Calgary, Alberta; and Salinas, California. The RAA sanctioned events, selected judges, and established purse awards and point systems. Their judges documented and determined champions in each event. The new organization was far from perfect. Often, prize money was not as advertised and judging was sometimes unfair.

The RAA inaugurated the first national champions in 1929. However, they did not include any women's events. Bonnie McCarroll (1897–1929) was killed after being thrown from a bronc at the Pendleton Round-Up. This tragedy initiated a national outcry against women competing in rodeo events.

In 1930, rain spoiled a rodeo at Miller's 101 Ranch in Ponca City, Oklahoma. Turtles came out and someone had an idea to race the turtles instead of horses. With a whopping 10,000 entries, most watched as most of the turtles laid still while just a few plodded along. First place went to the owner of turtle Goober Dust taking home $7,100. Second place took home $1,250. These turtles, however, were not attributed to the Cowboy Turtles Association (CTA) which was started several years later in 1936.

In 1934, the World Series Rodeo arrived in Madison Square Garden. The rodeo offered $40,000 in prizes. The World Series Rodeo promoter, Colonel William T. Johnson, had lost $40,000 promoting a Wild West Show in Texas six years prior and decided to promote his money back. He put on five rodeos a year and expected to make $1,000,000, with his contract in New York expected to make $75,000. He estimated losing $6,000 a year to bad loans to cowboys. Johnson was not a member of the Rodeo Association of America but his events offered more prize money and cowboys seemed to find his events the most enjoyable. But by 1939, William Johnson had sold all of his rodeo stock and was not in attendance at the World Series Rodeo. Instead, he went back to ranching after completely selling out of his highly speculative business.

In 1935, Earl W. Bascom, along with his brother Weldon, Mel and Jake Lybbert and Waldo "Salty" Ross produced the first rodeos in southern Mississippi, working from Columbia, in the process holding one of the world's first night rodeos held outdoors under electric lights and bringing in brahma bulls for the bull-riding event. These rodeos also featured trick roping, stunt riding and other novelty acts. Mississippian Sam Hickman financed their operations, which were successful from 1935 to 1937. (The first night rodeo was held in Preston, Idaho, in 1934.)

In 1936, during the Boston Garden Rodeo, William Johnson refused to add entry fees into the prize money. A group of angry cowboys formed the Cowboy Turtles Association. It was the first association of contestants. They called themselves turtles because they were slow to organize but eventually stuck their heads out.

That same year, Tex Austin, Wild West promoter, was charged with "permitting an animal to be terrified" when a steer accidentally crashed into the exit gate of the arena.

In 1937, Pete Knight died after suffering from internal injuries after being thrown from the horse Duster at a rodeo in Hayward, California. At the time of this death, he had more champion titles and prize money than any other bronc rider in the world.

Walter Cravens, steer rider, was thrown and trampled and died one day later of a punctured lung at the World Series Rodeo in New York City.

By 1939, rodeos attracted twice as many spectators as auto racing and baseball.

In 1940, the Cowboys Amateur Association (CAA) formed in California. Its purpose was to allow amateurs to compete and gain more experience before moving up to the Rodeo Cowboys Association (RCA). Members were required to move up to the RCA once their earnings reached $500. The CAA also encouraged participation from women in barrel racing and cutting contests.

In 1945, the Cowboy Turtles Association changed their name to the Rodeo Cowboys Association (RCA), which later in 1975 changed to the Professional Rodeo Cowboys Association (PRCA).

In 1947, movie star Gene Autry signed a contract to star in the Madison Square Garden Rodeo. He received a salary of $1,500 a day for a 33-day run as a performer.

In 1948, the Girl's Rodeo Association was started by a group of Texas ranch women. Today, the organization has two sister associations – the Professional Women's Rodeo Association (PWRA) and the Women's Professional Rodeo Association (WPRA).

In 1949 the National Intercollegiate Rodeo Association was formed and grew extremely quickly. The first College National Finals Rodeo (CNFR) was held the same year in San Francisco, California. By 1951, the association had 41 participating colleges.

By 1955, it was estimated that there were over 600 rodeos in the country. The Miss Rodeo America pageant was organized with the first pageant held by International Rodeo Management in Casper, Wyoming.

The first National Finals Rodeo was held in Dallas, Texas in 1959. The top 15 money-earners from the RCA in each event were invited to compete and winnings from the NFR were added to their winnings from the rodeo circuit to determine a world champion. In 1960, the NFR was shown on TV broadcast by CBS.

In 1961, rodeo interest further branched out to include high school students with the formation of the National High School Rodeo Association.

The NFR moved to Los Angeles, California, in 1962 and then settled in Oklahoma City, Oklahoma, for a 20-year stay from 1965 to 1984. From 1985 to 2019, the event was held at the Thomas & Mack Center in Las Vegas, Nevada. In 2020, it was held at Globe Life Field in Arlington, Texas, where it was for one season, before returning to Thomas & Mack since 2021.

In 1979 the PRCA established the ProRodeo Hall of Fame located in Colorado Springs, Colorado. It is the only museum in the world devoted to the sport of professional rodeo and the PRCA rodeo cowboy. The statue in the front of the hall depicts Casey Tibbs riding the bronc Necktie.

In 1987, the National Circuit Finals Rodeo began in Pocatello, Idaho. The top two contestants in each event from the 12 different PRCA regional circuits compete for the title of national circuit finals champion for each event. Dodge became a title sponsor for the event in 1991.

With all of the attention rodeo began to get from the media, animal rights concerns escalated. Friends of Rodeo were formed in 1992 as an organization to protect rodeo. That same year, a group of 20 professional bull riders, each of which contributed $1,000, formed the Professional Bull Riders (PBR) based in Colorado Springs, Colorado. The organization aims to take one of the most famous events in rodeo into a stand-alone sport. They have flourished and today the Monster Energy PBR Unleash the Beast is a 29-city, $10 million tour that attracts more than 100 million viewers on televised events.

In 2015, the Bull Riding Hall of Fame, located in Fort Worth, Texas, was established. This hall of fame inducts bull riders and bulls from both the PRCA and the PBR. It also gathers and preserves memorabilia and artifacts from bull riding.

The term rodeo (from the Spanish rodear) means 'to surround' or 'go around' in Spanish, and was first used in American English about 1834 to denote a "round up" of cattle. Early rodeo-like affairs of the 1820s and 1830s were informal events in the western United States and northern Mexico with cowboys and vaqueros testing their work skills against one another.

== Additional material ==
Santa Fe, New Mexico, lays claim to the first rodeo based on a letter dated 1847 written by Captain Mayne Reid from Santa Fe to a friend in Ireland:

"At this time of year, the cowmen have what is called the round-up, when the calves are branded and the fat beasts selected to be driven to a fair hundreds of miles away. This round-up is a great time for the cowhand, a Donny-brook fair it is indeed. They contest with each other for the best roping and throwing, and there are horse races and whiskey and wines. At night in clear moonlight, there is dancing on the streets."

Following the American Civil War, organized rodeo emerged with the first held in Cheyenne, Wyoming, in 1872. Prescott, Arizona claims the distinction of holding the first professional rodeo when it charged admission and awarded trophies in 1888. Between 1890 and 1910, rodeo became a public entertainment made popular through Wild West Shows and Fourth of July celebrations with Buffalo Bill Cody, Annie Oakley, and other charismatic stars lending their glamour and prestige to the spectacle. Oakley was a sharpshooter in Cody's Wild West show (rather than as a rodeo performer), but she created the image of the cowgirl and appeared as the first cowgirl in a western film shot by Thomas Alva Edison in 1894.

In the early decades of the twentieth century, rodeo became a spectator sport with round ups, frontier days, and other themed exhibitions attracting regional audiences. In the 1920s, Madison Square Garden and Boston Garden drew nationwide attention staging rodeos. Every rodeo was independent and selected its own events from among nearly one hundred different contests. Until World War I, there was little difference between rodeo and charreada, and competitors from the United States, Mexico and Canada participated freely in all three countries.

In 1929, local rodeo boards, stock contractors, and sponsors formed the Rodeo Association of America (later the International Rodeo Association) to police rodeo by forbidding false advertising of big money purses, and self-styled "championship" rodeos. By the mid-1930s, cowboys had organized themselves into the Cowboys Turtle Association which eventually became the Rodeo Cowboys Association, and finally the Professional Rodeo Cowboys Association in 1975. Gas rationing and other restrictions attending World War II hit rodeo hard with women's ranch events such as bronc riding curtailed and inexpensive barrel racing and beauty pageants being held in their stead. Following the war, rodeo gender bias faced women and in response they formed the Girls Rodeo Association in 1948 (now the Women's Professional Rodeo Association (WPRA)). Women then held their own rodeos.

In 1958, the RCA created the National Finals Rodeo Commission to produce a major, end-of-season rodeo event similar in prestige to baseball's World Series and hockey's Stanley Cup. CBS telecast the first such event. Though rodeo had traditionally suspected television to be a liability rather than an asset (keeping people home to watch rodeo rather than attending competitions), the industry heartily approved the telecast. Rodeo schools, which had their tentative beginnings in the 1930s, gained attention and growth through the 1950s, with the first regular school opening in 1962.

In the 1970s, rodeo saw unprecedented growth. Contestants referred to as "the new breed" brought rodeo increasing media attention. These contestants were young, typically from an urban background, and chose rodeo for its athletic rewards. Photojournalists and reporters viewed them as a source of interesting stories about behind-the-scenes routines and lifestyles. The "new breed" was a far cry from traditional rodeo men who sought all-night binges rather than the stock portfolios, airline credit cards, recording and television contracts, and retirement packages desired by the new breed. By 1985, one-third of PRCA members admitted to a college education and one-half admitted to never having worked on a cattle ranch.

== Claimants for the oldest or longest-running rodeo ==
- Fort Worth Stock Show and Rodeo, longest running in the United States (livestock show began 1896, rodeo added 1917)
- Cowtown Rodeo, longest running weekly rodeo in the United States, started in 1929
- Prescott, Arizona, in 1888 was the first to charge an admission.
- Mandan, North Dakota, in 1883 hosted the first organized contest with admission and was considered part of the “Big Loop” with Cheyenne and Calgary.
- Payson, Arizona, oldest annual continuous running rodeo.
- Pecos, Texas, first rodeo on July 4, 1883, and in 1929 began running annually without interruption.
- Deer Trail, Colorado on July 4, 1869.
- Raymond Stampede, Canada's first professional rodeo and longest running, started in 1902
- Eastern Oregon Livestock Show, Oldest show in the Northwest, started in 1908

== See also ==
- Indian rodeo
- National Cowboy & Western Heritage Museum
