= Tillie Baldwin =

Norwegian-American rodeo cowgirl

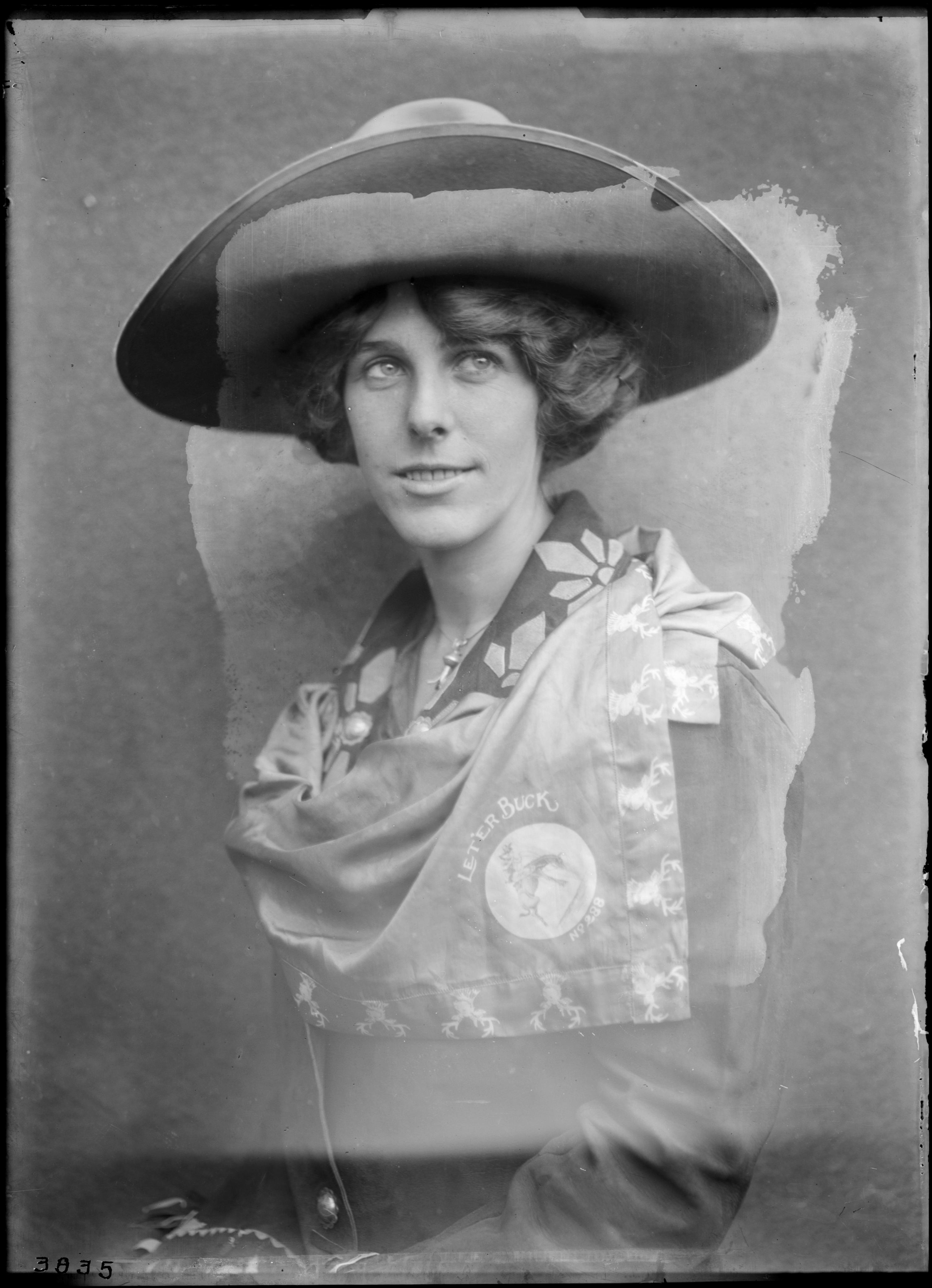
- Baldwin in 1912
- Born: Anna Mathilda Winger; January 11, 1888; Arendal, Norway
- Died: October 23, 1958 (aged 70); Connecticut, U.S.
- Resting place: Union Cemetery, Niantic, Connecticut, U.S.
- Occupations: Rodeo contestant and performer
- Spouse: William C. Slate (m. 1941-1958)

Tillie Baldwin (January 11, 1888 – October 23, 1958), born Anna Mathilda Winger, was an American rodeo contestant and performer in Wild West shows. She is credited as being one of the first women to attempt steer wrestling.

== Biography ==
Tillie Baldwin was born Anna Mathilda Winger in Arendal, Norway. She immigrated to the United States at age 14 and first trained as a hair dresser. She began her rodeo career riding during 1911 in Los Angeles, California, where she won the bronc riding competition. At the Pendleton Round-Up in Pendleton, Oregon, during 1912, she won both the trick riding and cowgirls' bronc riding contests. She was also a trick rider and relay racer. Her image was captured by Walter S. Bowman, a professional photographer in Pendleton. Later Bowman's 1915 image of Bonnie McCarroll being thrown from a horse named Silver at the Pendleton Round-Up became famous. McCarroll died years later in another accident at the Pendleton Round-Up.

Mathilda Winger became Tillie Baldwin after she joined Captain Jack Baldwin's Wild West Show. She later joined Will Rogers' vaudeville troupe and then worked at the 101 Ranch Wild West Show. She credited Rogers for first giving her the opportunity to become famous. Later in life she ran a riding academy.

In 1941 she married William C. Slate (1901–1975) in Essex, Connecticut. She died in 1958 in Connecticut at age 70. She was buried in Union Cemetery in Niantic, Connecticut.

== Legacy ==
Tillie Baldwin was inducted into the National Cowgirl Museum and Hall of Fame in 2000 and the Rodeo Hall of Fame of the National Cowboy Hall of Fame in 2004.

== Other sources ==
- LeCompte, Mary Lou (2000) Cowgirls of the Rodeo: Pioneer Professional Athletes (University of Illinois Press) ISBN 9780252068744
- Branzei, Sylvia (2011) Rebel in a Dress - Cowgirls (Running Press) ISBN 9780762443840
- Bernstein, Joel H. (2007) Wild Ride: The History and Lore of Rodeo (Gibbs Smith) ISBN 9781586857455
