= Pendleton Round-Up and Happy Canyon Hall of Fame =

Coordinates: 45.66916°N 118.798197°W

- Established: 1969
- Location: Pendleton, Oregon
- Type: Hall of fame
- Website: PRHCHOF

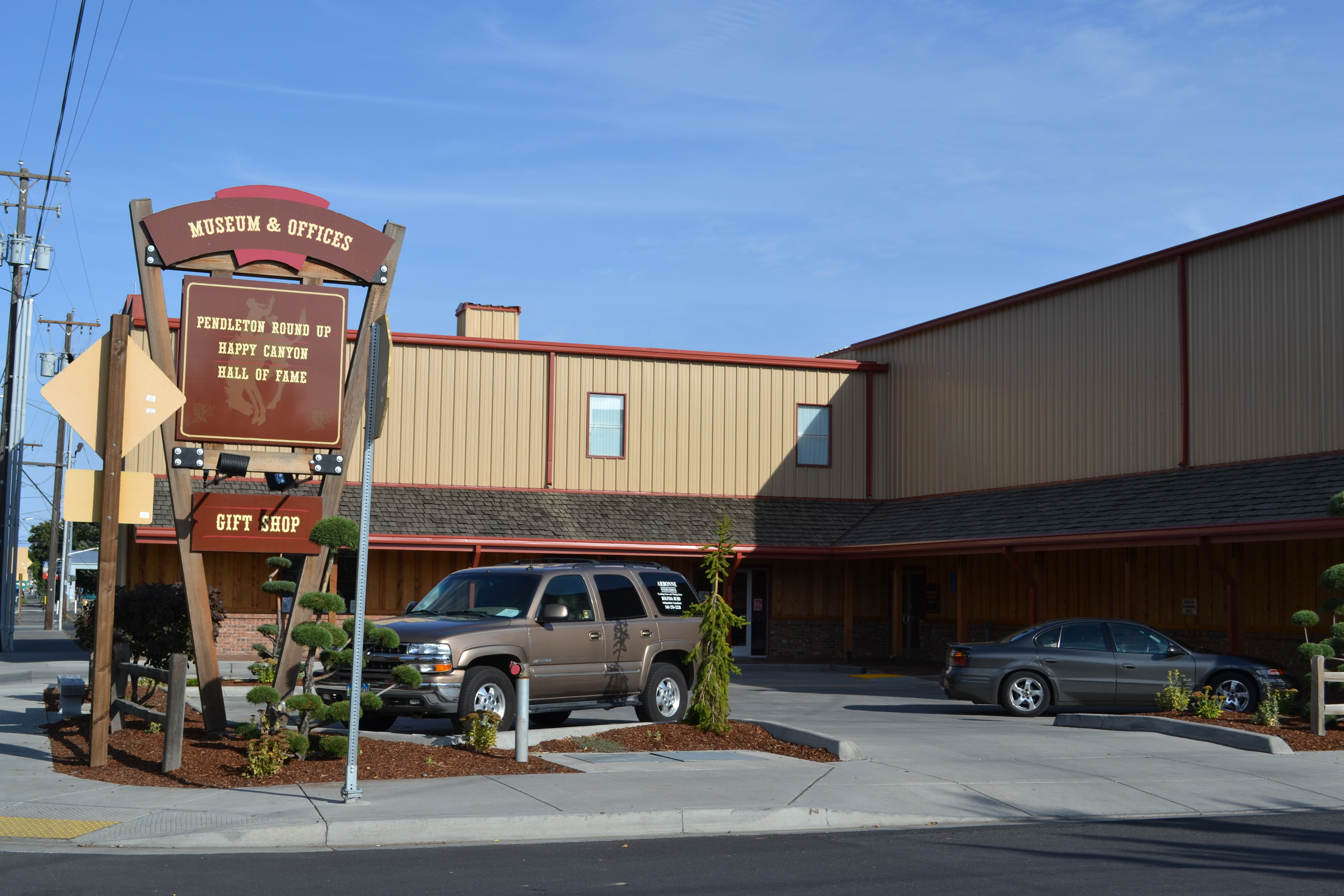
Pendleton Round-Up Happy Canyon Hall of Fame

The Pendleton Round-Up and Happy Canyon Hall of Fame, is a hall of fame located in Pendleton, Oregon, United States. Begun in 1969, it was the first hall of fame started by an individual show, the Pendleton Round-Up. Exhibits focus on show memorabilia, and cowboy and Native American artifacts, including a full-sized teepee, saddles, clothing, Indian regalia, photographs, weapons, trophies, and wagons.

== Hall of Fame Inductees ==
2020-2021 Inductees

- Butch Knowles
- Jack Shaw
- Mary Hines
- Badger (horse)

2019 Inductees

- Trevor Brazile
- Marlo & Billy Ward
- Steve Corey
- Dean Forth

2016 Inductees

- J.D. Yates
- Doug and Heather Corey
- Chief Bill Burke
- Smokey (gelding)

2015 Inductees

- Lewis Feild
- Cecelia Bearchum

2014 Inductees

- Robin A. Fletcher, Jr
- Clint Corey
- Fritz Hill
- Gary Rempel

2013 Inductees

- Mike Beers
- Betty Branstetter
- Echo "Magic" (mare)

2012 Inductees

- Gilbert Minthorn
- Poker Jim
- Amos Pond
- No Shirt
- Caroline Motanic Davis
- Frank McCarroll
- George Richmond

2011 Inductees

- Kenny Stanton
- Flint Rasmussen
- John Spain
- Wes Grilley

2010 Inductees

- King Merritt
- Roy "Super Looper" Cooper
- Tom Currin
- V.W. "Mac" McCormack

2009 Inductees

- Ollie Osborn
- Willie Wocatsie
- Deb Copenhaver

2008 Inductees

- Christian “Sonny” Frederick Davis
- Fred W. Hill
- Bonnie Tucker Blankinship

2007 Inductees

- C.M. “Mort” Bishop, Jr.
- Phillip Morris Lyne
- John S. “Jiggs” Fisk

2006 Inductees

- Louie & Marie Dick
- Harry Charters
- Slim Pickens
- Jack Q. Hodgen

2005 Inductees

- Cataldo*
- Walk Arnold
- William G. “Wilbur” Shaw
- Ron J. Hudson

2004 Inductees

- Casey Tibbs
- Dr. Richard Koch
- Jesse Jones, Jr.

2003 Inductees

- Wallace Smith
- Chief Raymond Burke
- Pat Gugin

2002 Inductees

- Guy Allen
- Frank Tubbs

2001 Inductees

- Ester Motanic
- R.W. Fletcher
- Bonnie McCarroll
- Jack Sweek

2000 Inductees

- Beauregard*
- Paul Cimmiyotti
- Susie Williams
- McKinley Williams
- Bill McMacken

1999 Inductees

- Main Street Cowboys
- Jim Shoulders
- Beryl Grilley

1998 Inductees

- Harry Vold
- Larry Mahan
- Bob & Betty Byer

1997 Inductees

- Elgin Stagecoach Team
- Dick Truitt
- Jim Rosenberg
- Lawrence G. Frazier

1996 Inductees

- The Currin Family
- Tom Simonton
- Dean Oliver

1995 Inductees

- Everett Shaw
- Bertha Kapernik Blancett
- The Hawkins Brothers

1994 Inductees

- John Dalton
- Herman Rosenberg

1993 Inductees

- Leonard King
- Floyd “Bus” Howdyshell

1992 Inductees

- William Minthorn
- Lester H. Hamley
- J.J. Hamley
- J. David Hamley
- Don McLaughlin
- Duff Severe
- Bill Severe

1991 Inductees

- Tessie Williams
- Gerald Swaggart

1990 Inductees

- Monty*
- Verne Terjeson
- Doris Swayze Bounds

1989 Inductees

- Jack Duff
- Bob Chambers

1988 Inductees

- Shorty*
- Bob Christensen
- Mildred Searcy

1987 Inductees

- Ella Lazinka Ganger
- Bob Hales

1986 Inductees

- Molly*
- Sid Seale
- Pat Folsom

1985 Inductees

- Peanuts*
- Everett Bowman
- Bob Fletcher

1984 Inductees

- Clark McIntire
- Art Motanic

1983 Inductees

- Karl Doering
- George Doak
- Dan Bell

1982 Inductees

- Roy Bishop
- Clarence Bishop
- Chauncey Bishop

1981 Inductees

- Ike Rude
- Harley Tucker

1980 Inductees

- Necklace*
- Monte Montana

1979 Inductees

- Finis Kirkpatrick

1978 Inductees

- Sharkey*
- Monk Carden
- George Moens

1977 Inductees

- Domino*
- Marion Hansell
- Lew W. Minor
- Eliza Bill

1976 Inductees

- Dr. Joseph Brennan
- Berkley Davis

1975 Inductees

- Miss Klamath*
- Shoat Webster
- Elsie Fitzmaurice Dickson

1974 Inductees

- Blue Blazes*
- Bob Crosby
- Bill Switzler

1973 Inductees

- Bill McAdoo*
- Tim Bernard
- Melissa Parr
- John Hales

1972 Inductees

- Sam Jackson*
- Jackson Sundown
- E.N. “Pink” Boylen

1971 Inductees

- U-Tell-Um*
- Badger Mountain*
- Phillip Bill
- Pete Knight
- Mabel Strickland
- Lawrence Lieuallen
- Hugo Strickland
- Allen Drumheller

1970 Inductees

- 5 Minutes to Midnight*
- Roosevelt Trophy
- Raye LeGrow
- Carl Arnold

1969 Inductees

- Phillip Rollins*
- No Name*
- Long Tom*
- Midnight*
- War Paint*
- Yakima Canutt
- Til Taylor
- Roy Raley
- Lee Caldwell
- Herb Thompson
- Henry Collins
- George Strand
- George Fletcher
- Gene Rambo
- Clarence Burke

   * An animal inductee
