= Lee Moorhouse =

American photographer (1850–1926)

Moorhouse between 1900 and 1910

Lee Leander Moorhouse (1850–1926) was an American photographer and an Indian agent for the Umatilla Indian Reservation. From 1888 to 1916, he produced over 9,000 images documenting urban, rural, and Native American life in the Columbia Basin, and particularly Umatilla County, Oregon, and the city of Pendleton.

== Life ==
Moorhouse was born in Marion County, Iowa, and as a child traveled along the Oregon Trail to Walla Walla, Washington with his family in 1861. As an adult, he worked as a miner, surveyor, rancher, businessman, civic leader, real estate operator, and insurance salesman. In addition to acting as an Indian agent, from 1879 to 1883 he served as an Assistant Adjutant General of the Third Brigade of the Oregon State Militia.

== Photography ==
Moorhouse considered himself an amateur photographer, but in the 1880s the hobby became an increasingly important part of his life. He knew Walter S. Bowman, a professional photographer in Pendleton, Oregon.

Moorhouse's photographs of members of the Cayuse, Walla Walla, and Umatilla are of particular significance. Moorhouse also captured a significant variety of images on the development of the Oregon Territory. Six hundred views of ranch life, particularly wheat farming, document the ranchers, their homes, itinerant laborers, and their work in the fields. There are also thousands of images of small town and community life; businesses, schools, churches, and various forms of transportation, such as locomotives and automobiles. Social functions and entertainments appear in his photographs of circuses, parades, Wild West shows, and most notably the Pendleton Roundup.

Moorhouse published a short book of photographs and created postcards featuring his work. As many as 100,000 postcards may have been sold.

Three hundred of his photographs were purchased by the U.S. Bureau of American Ethnology in the 1930s. Seven thousand images by Moorhouse are maintained by the Special Collections & University Archives of the University of Oregon Libraries; the Moorhouse family donated the photographs in 1948. Another 1,400 images were given to the Umatilla County Library in about 1958.
