= Make It Do =

Quarter Horse rodeo horse

- Breed: Quarter Horse
- Discipline: Rodeo
- Sire: Breeze Bar
- Dam: Camelot Broom
- Maternal grandsire: Camelot's Little Cuero
- Sex: Gelding
- Foaled: 1964
- Country: United States
- Color: Sorrel
- Breeder: Judd L. Morse
- Owner: C. R. Jones

Record
- 6 wins

Honors
- American Quarter Horse Hall of Fame; ProRodeo Hall of Fame

Make It Do (foaled 1964), better known as Peanuts, was a Quarter Horse gelding. Peanuts was inducted into the American Quarter Horse Hall of Fame in 2009. He was inducted into the ProRodeo Hall of Fame in the inaugural class of 1979.

== Background ==
Peanuts was a 1964 sorrel gelding quarter horse, best known as a rodeo horse in the steer wrestling event. He was also a racehorse, winning six times before beginning his rodeo career.

"If you bet on that little horse, you won't win peanuts." Peanuts' owner C.R. Jones traces his nickname back to his racing days. The horse's jockey, Jack Robinson, referred to him as "Goober" and claimed the 875 pound horse was "no bigger than a peanut." This quarter horse was by champion Breeze Bar out of Camelot Broom by Camelot's Little Cuero. Judd Morse of San Jacinto, California, bred him. When Peanuts reached three years of age, he was traded to a cowboy who later sold him to his most prominent and last owner. That owner was C.R. Jones of Lakeside, California. Jones was a professional steer wrestler. He hazed Peanuts for a year and then used him for steer wrestling.

== Racing career ==
Out of all the horses the late Stan Immenschuh worked with, one of the ones he recalls most affectionately was Peanuts. "Peanuts first came into my life in January 1966, when I arrived at the Shamel Ranch in Murrieta, California, owned by breeder Judd Morse. Early one morning, I was there to load up a bunch of running horses to go to Bay Meadows Racetrack at San Mateo." His then-wife and ranch trainer LaRae told him Peanuts would win his first start and the most races overall, which he found dubious given that the horse was still only 850 pounds. However, after a couple of weeks, "we all found that this little horse, Make It Do, might just do": in his first start, he left the gate quickly and won the race by a couple of lengths against good competitors. At the winner's circle, Jack Robinson, his first call jockey, said, "Stan, I don’t know how far he’ll run, but he can sure as hell leave that gate." After that, Peanuts continued leaving the gate speedily and winning races.

Out of 22 races, he won six of them and earned $5,792. Immenschuh said, "When Peanuts turned 3 years old, he finally started to grow and changed into a horse that would later be stout enough to carry a 'big cowboy' to a steer." His ankle started bothering him, so Immenschuh turned him out for a bit, then traded him to a cowboy named Bob Barnes, who later sold him to C.R. Jones. Immenschuh recalled, "I picked up the Sports News the other day to read that Peanuts had won another world championship. I thought now 16 years old, Make It Do — alias Peanuts — made it do one more time."

== Rodeo career ==
Peanuts competed in the Rodeo Cowboys Association and the Professional Rodeo Cowboys Association (PRCA) when they changed their name in 1975.

Immenschuh only had Peanuts when he was racing, but Immenschuh had a rodeo background too. He claims when Peanuts was racing he was small but he was "a smart horse, one of a kind". When he started bulldogging, he took to the sport right away. His owner C.R. Jones would put a lot of bulldoggers on him in one rodeo. Immenschuh recalled how he was over at Sunland Park in El Paso, Texas, and attended the rodeo slack. Jones had 12 bulldoggers ride Peanuts and Peanuts made the same run for each of them.

According to Immenschuh's good friend and associate, hall of fame trainer Bubba Cascio, "Immenschuh got [Peanuts] broke and started the right way, so the horse had a good mind, had a good disposition, wanted to do right for whoever was riding him. Nothin’ ever bothered Peanuts and that's why he became such a great bulldoggin’ horse."

Peanuts took many notable cowboys to winning world titles in the PRCA. Tom Ferguson, of Miami, Oklahoma, won six consecutive World All-Around Championships and three World Steer Wrestling Championships. Frank Shepperson and Bob Marshall both won World Steer Wrestling Championships. Ten other cowboys rode Peanuts at the National Finals Rodeo (NFR). Peanuts won the PRCA steer wrestling title four consecutive years from 1976 to 1979. At the Calgary Stampede he won the average for five consecutive years. Peanuts qualified for the NFR from 1973 to 1980. For each of those years, a minimum of five top 15 cowboys rode him according to the horses's obituary. For his total participation at the NFR, they estimated that in 450 runs, the cowboys wrestled 225 consecutive steers from Peanuts' back without missing one.

== Retirement and death ==
Jones retired Peanuts in 1981 in a small plot at his home near Lakeside, California. Over $1 million in earnings was claimed on Peanuts in rodeos throughout the United States and Canada. Until 1977 there was no recognition of notable steer wrestling horses. That changed in 1977 when steer wrestler/roper Corky Warren established an annual trophy in memory of his wife. That year the top 30 money winners voted on Peanuts to receive the inaugural trophy for the 1977 and 1978 season. Make It Do was euthanized in 1995 due to complications from intestine issues.

== Honors ==
- 2009 American Quarter Horse Hall of Fame
- 1985 Pendleton Round-Up and Happy Canyon Hall of Fame
- 1979 ProRodeo Hall of Fame
- 1966 AQHA Register of Merit
