= West of the Pecos =

West of the Pecos may refer to:

== Arts and entertainment ==
- West of the Pecos (1922 film), a silent Western film written, directed, and starring Neal Hart as hero Jack Laramie
- West of the Pecos, a 1937 novel by Zane Grey with hero Pecos Smith, first published as a serial beginning in 1931 in The American Magazine
  - West of the Pecos (1934 film), a Western film adaptation starring Richard Dix
  - West of the Pecos (1945 film), a Western film adaptation starring Robert Mitchum
- West of the Pecos, a 1971 play about Roy Bean by Tim Kelly
- West of Pecos, a book of the "Sundown Riders" series by Ralph Compton

== Other uses ==
- West of the Pecos Museum, Pecos, Texas
- West of the Pecos Rodeo, Pecos, Texas, claimant for first rodeo

== See also ==
- Trans-Pecos, the area of West Texas that is west of the Pecos River
- Judge Roy Bean Jr. (1825–1903), self-described as "The Only Law West of the Pecos"
- West of Hot Dog, Stan Laurel 1924 movie spoof of the 1922 film West of the Pecos
- West of the Pesos, 1960 cartoon
