= Walter S. Bowman =

American photographer (1865–1938)

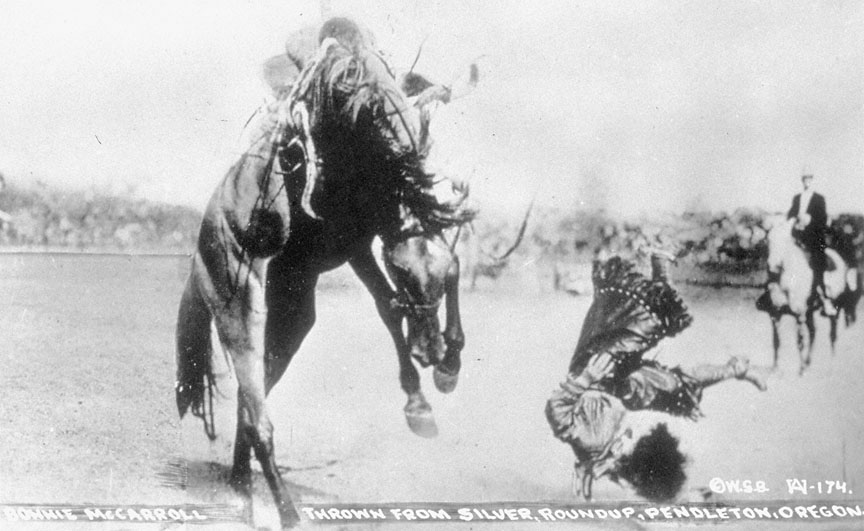
A 1915 photograph by Walter S. Bowman of Bonnie McCarroll being thrown from a horse named Silver at the Pendleton Round-Up (Displayed by the National Cowgirl Museum and Hall of Fame)

Walter Scott Bowman (February 8, 1865 – November 27, 1938) was a prominent professional photographer in Pendleton, Oregon. His work is included in the University of Oregon's Bowman, Moorhouse, Furlong, and Drake collections. Bowman captured well known action shots from the Pendleton Round-Up that are included at the National Cowgirl Hall of Fame. The National Cowboy Museum includes numerous Bowman photographs and postcard images. Bowman photographed events around Umatilla, Oregon, including parades, marching bands, railroad scenes, Pendleton High School team pictures, dances, studio portraits and images of Native American (the Umatilla Indian Reservation is adjacent to the city of Pendleton). The University of Oregon's Walter S. Bowman photographs collection includes 379 glass-plate negatives, 51 cellulose acetate negatives, and 200 silver gelatin photoprints.

== Background ==
Bowman was part of a prominent pioneer family that came west from Iowa in 1862. His parents were married in Osceola, Iowa. His cousin, Oliver Purl Bowman (1862-1939), built the Bowman Hotel (Pendleton, Oregon).

Walter S. Bowman was born February 8, 1865, to Henry and Elizabeth (Owens) Bowman. His birthplace may have been where the family lived by Birch Creek, Oregon.

== Career ==
Bowman began his photography studies under T. C. Ward in 1887 and purchased Ward's studio in 1890. Bowman worked in Pendleton from the late 1880s to the mid-1930s documenting life in Eastern Oregon including at events such as the Pendleton Round-Up and workers at the Pendleton Woolen Mills. Bowman was a member of the Pendleton Camera Club and knew O. C. Allen and Lee Moorhouse (who he seems to have taken under his wing). Moorhouse lived with the Bowman family upon his arrival in Pendleton and captured an image of Bowman's studio along the Umatilla River at 916 Main Street. Bowman was considered Pendleton's "premier photographer" until his retirement in the mid-1930s. His studio was on the banks of the Umatilla River.

Florence Bowman Windsor remembered Bowman owning the first car in Pendleton (it may have been a Maxwell) and his arrest for driving twelve miles an hour down Main Street. Bowman died in 1938 after crashed his car off an icy road embankment about 10 miles east of Pendleton; his wife was also injured.

Bowman's wife Eugenia (Ellenberger) bowman died December 5, 1954, at St. Anthony's Hospital. after an illness of 17 days. She lived in Pendleton from 1901 and was born in Berne, Switzerland. She moved to Umatilla County at 13 and lived in Pilot Rock, Oregon, with her mother Fritz Ellenberger. She married Walter in 1934. He was an avid hunter.

== University of Oregon collection ==
The University of Oregon collection includes 385 glass-plate negatives, 17 nitrate negatives, 35 cellulose acetate negatives, 7 safety negatives (replacing nitrate originals), and 338 vintage and modern silver gelatin photoprints. Twelve of the prints are on Bowman's studio mounts and another twelve are postcards. The university's collection of Bowman photographs includes images donated to the library from 1947 to 1953 through the efforts of Umatilla County Court Judge James H. Sturgis and Lee D. Drake, a Pendleton newspaperman, county clerk, and collector of historic materials. Drake was a partner in the East Oregonian Publishing Co. and head of the Old Oregon Trail Committee of Umatilla County. Drake collected negatives he deemed worthwhile and destroyed some 900 others.

The collection includes images of early automobiles and their owners in Pendleton, including a delivery of Ford roadsters by railcar to the city. Images of the Pendleton Woolen Mills are also featured.

== Selected works ==
- Jack Joyce on Angel (1912)
- Roy Adams Riding Sea Lion?, Let 'er Buck, Round Up, Pendleton, Oregon
- C. E. Morton Six Feet Up on Bucking Bull, Round Up, 1914
- Interior of Pendleton Woolen Mills
- "Fancy Riding, Tillie Baldwin, the Champion Lady Buckaroo"
- "The Bull Gets His Man at the Round Up"
- Photograph of a Native American boy with a prosthetic hand. The boy posed standing on a wicker chair (1890s).
- Photographic postcard. Lewis Mosely on "Sunfish Molly," Riding for the Championship of the World Pendleton, Oregon, ca. 1915
- Indian women c. 1895
- The Pendleton Hose Team at the 1897 Eastern Oregon and Washington Firemen's Tournament at Baker City
- Woman with pistol (circa 1900)
- Images of masquerade at Lehman Hot Springs.
- Wheat harvests

== See also ==
- Ralph R. Doubleday
