= Everett Bowman =

Rodeo cowboy (1899–1971)

Everett Bowman (July 12, 1899 – October 25, 1971) was an American rodeo cowboy who competed from the 1920s to 1940s. During his career, he won the Rodeo Association of America (RAA) All-Around Cowboy championship in 1935 and 1937 and was second three times; he also won eight titles in individual disciplines. Bowman was involved in organizing cowboys, founding the first group for pro rodeo competitors, the Cowboys' Turtle Association (CTA), now known as the Professional Rodeo Cowboys Association (PRCA). From 1936 to 1945, he served as president of the organization. Bowman was inducted into the ProRodeo Hall of Fame in 1979.

== Rodeo career ==
Bowman was born in Hope, New Mexico, and moved to Arizona when he was 13 years old; he also spent part of his youth in Texas. He joined the pro rodeo circuit in the 1920s: historian Michael Allen wrote that he started in 1924, while the Associated Press gave his debut year as 1925. According to the agency, he took up the sport after attending a Salt Lake City rodeo. In 1926, he won two disciplines and the all-around title at the Ellensburg Rodeo, and finished second for the all-around title at the Pendleton Round-Up. The next year, Bowman won the steer wrestling title at the Ellensburg Rodeo for the second straight year, and finished tied with his brother, Ed, for the all-around title. Bowman teamed with Jack Traynor to win a team steer roping world championship and set a single-run speed record that same year. In 1929, Bowman was the all-around champion at the Calgary Stampede despite not participating in the bronc riding discipline. Bowman won his first RAA season championship in the tie-down roping discipline that year; he added a steer wrestling championship in 1930.

At the Calgary Stampede in 1931, he set the fastest-ever time for a calf roping run. Bowman won a third Ellensburg Rodeo steer wrestling title in 1932, and earned an all-around victory at the Frontier Day event in Prescott, Arizona. In 1933, he claimed the RAA season steer wrestling championship for the second time. The year 1935 was Bowman's most successful on the RAA circuit in terms of season championships. He was named All-Around Cowboy winner, and earned his third steer wrestling and second tie-down roping titles. Bowman finished second in the All-Around Cowboy standings in 1936, but in 1937 won his second All-Around Cowboy crown in three years, along with his third calf roping title. That same year, he claimed his only season steer roping championship. In 1938, he won his eighth and final discipline title in steer wrestling, which was his fourth in that category; Bowman finished second in the All-Around Cowboy standings, trailing Burel Mulkey at the end of the season by 87 points. He repeated his second-place finish in 1939. His career ended in 1943, with his final performance at New York City.

Bowman won rodeo's Triple Crown (three season championships in one year) twice; Trevor Brazile and Jim Shoulders are the only other cowboys to achieve this feat more than once. During his career and after his death, media members compared Bowman to baseball's Babe Ruth. Fellow rodeo participant Phil Meadows credited him with doing "more to put the cowboy in good graces than any other man," calling him "a cowboy's cowboy." In competition, Allen said that "timed events" were considered a strength of Bowman. He did not compete in bronc riding after 1928, saying "Too many events and a man is no good in any of them."

== CTA leader ==
In November 1936, a rodeo was scheduled to be held in Boston, but cowboys were displeased with their lack of authority in organizing the event. Led by several cowboys, including Bowman, a group of cowboys began a strike. Although the promoter of the rodeo expressed interest in using replacement performers, the group's effort to engage in bargaining was successful. The Boston strike resulted in the formation of the CTA. Bowman was the founder of the CTA; it was the first organization of cowboys, and according to Bowman was named because of the lack of speed with which it was created. The group was initially named the United Cowboys' Turtle Association and was founded on November 6, 1936; the first word of their title was later removed. Rusty McGinty was elected as the organization's president, but he gave Bowman the position. Bowman served through 1945, when the CTA became the Rodeo Cowboys Association; the organization later changed its name to the PRCA, which it is now known as. He did announce his resignation in July 1939 when a group of cowboys refused to pay $500 fines for strikebreaking, but Bowman was reelected in February 1940 and nobody else was named to the position before then.

According to Bowman, even though the CTA's members were able to participate in strikes, the CTA was not a true union. The CTA fought for increased prize purses and control over who judged events. In 1937, the group participated in a national strike which affected events including the Ellensburg Rodeo and Pendleton Round-Up, forcing the use of cowboys who were not part of the CTA's membership. The dispute was resolved in Ellensburg in 1938, and in 1939 in Pendleton. The organization frequently battled with the RAA and rodeo committees, who the CTA saw as the RAA's membership.

Rodeo magazine editor Will Porter has referred to Bowman as "probably the most forceful man in rodeo history." The strong-minded personality he had has been the subject of criticism; author Joel H. Bernstein wrote of Bowman that he "was not the best of diplomats and there was no way to change his mind when he felt he was right." Despite this, he received praise from CTA member Everett Shaw, who said, "These young fellows in Rodeo now, or starting out, will never realize how much they owe to Everett Bowman."

== Later life and legacy ==
Bowman became a candidate for the sheriff's office in Maricopa County, Arizona as a Democrat in 1944, and gained a job as sheriff in Wickenburg. Historian Willard Porter said that, while in Wickenburg, he "held dances, taught horsemanship and talked rodeo to anyone who happened by." In addition, he worked as a rancher in Hillside, accompanied by his wife, Lois. Piloting was one of Bowman's hobbies; he had a pilot's license and once flew with Yavapai County Sheriff Willis Butler in a search for a missing two-year-old child. Into his 60s, Bowman continued to make public appearances. He was the grand marshal of a parade held in connection to Prescott's Frontier Days rodeo in 1966, and in 1969 accepted a movie role as a pastor in The Great White Hope. In 1971, Bowman died at the age of 72 while flying a plane he owned, which crashed near the ranch he tended. He was inducted into the ProRodeo Hall of Fame in 1979, the Pendleton Round-Up and Happy Canyon Hall of Fame in 1985, and the Ellensburg Rodeo Hall of Fame in 2004. Previously, he had been inducted into the Rodeo Hall of Fame of the National Cowboy and Western Heritage Museum in 1955.

== Bibliography ==
- Allen, Michael (1998). Rodeo cowboys in the North American imagination. University of Nevada Press. ISBN 978-0-87417-315-4.
- Bernstein, Joel H. (2007). Wild Ride: The History and Lore of Rodeo. Gibbs Smith. ISBN 978-1-58685-745-5.
