= Blue Mountain Conference =

High school athletic conference in Oregon, US

The Blue Mountain Conference (BMC) is a high school athletic conference located in the U.S. state of Oregon. The conference operates under the guidelines of the Oregon School Activities Association (OSAA) and competes in the 2A classification, which has five regional conferences throughout the state. The BMC is the easternmost 2A athletic conference in Oregon and consists of the following high schools:

- Elgin High School
- Enterprise High School
- Heppner Junior/Senior High School
- Irrigon Junior/Senior High School
- Pilot Rock High School
- Stanfield Secondary School
- Union High School
- Weston-McEwen High School

The BMC began its inaugural year of competition in the 2006–2007 school year, when the OSAA changed the number of classifications from four to six, setting up a completely new structure for athletics in Oregon for schools of all sizes. The BMC is currently made up of schools that were members of the (now defunct) Columbia Basin Conference and Wapiti League under the four class system. Other former members of the Columbia Basin Conference and Wapiti Leagues were placed in different conferences under the new OSAA classification realignment.
