= Bowman Hotel (Pendleton, Oregon) =

- U.S. National Register of Historic Places
- U.S. Historic district – Contributing property
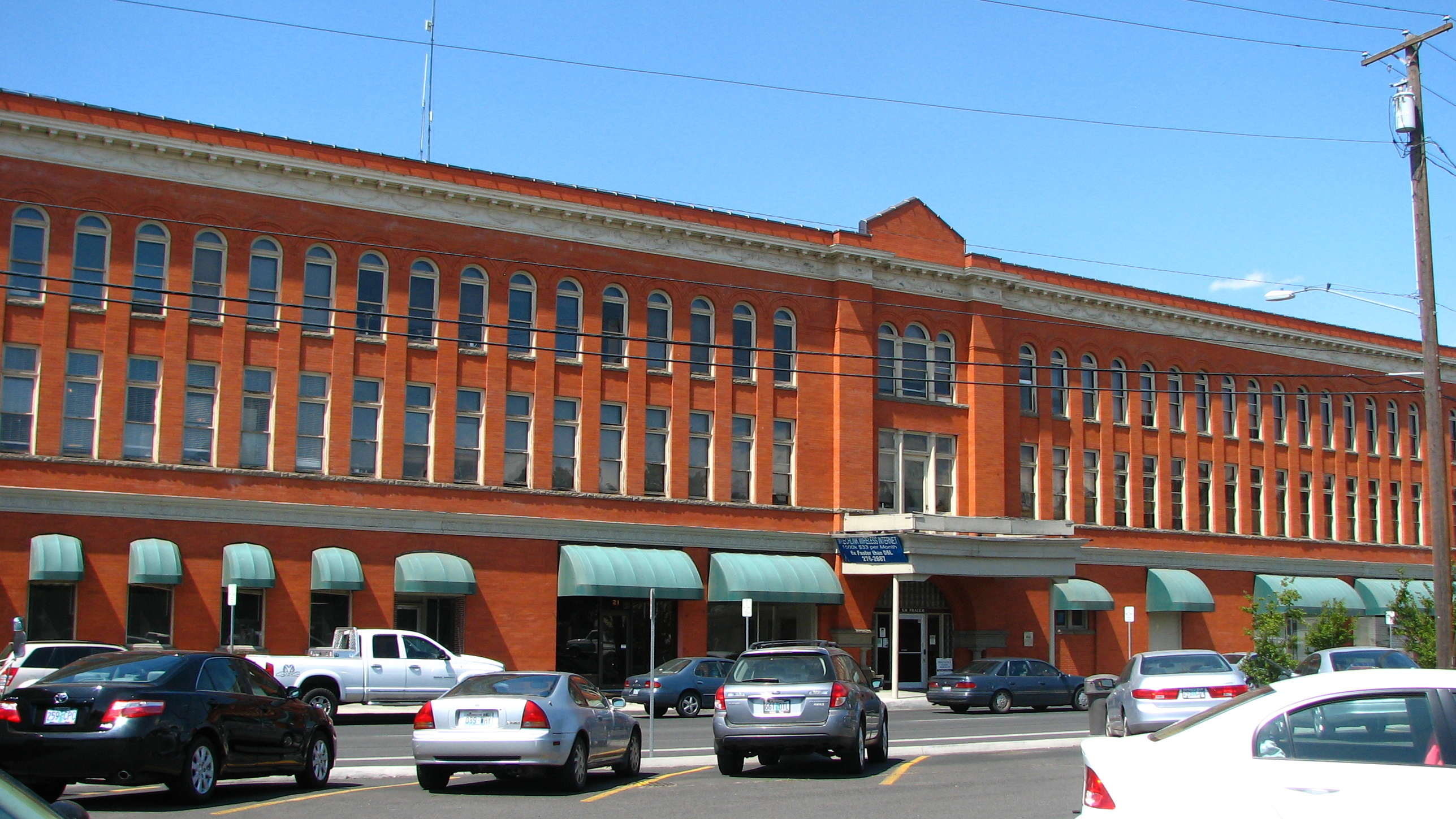

- Location within Oregon
- Location: 17 SW Frazer Avenue; Pendleton, Oregon
- Coordinates: 45°40′12″N 118°47′11″W
- Area: 0.2 acres (0.081 ha)
- Built: 1906
- Architectural style: American Renaissance
- Part of: South Main Street Commercial Historic District (ID86003260)
- NRHP reference No.: 80003381
- Added to NRHP: November 6, 1980

The Bowman Hotel is a historic three story brick hotel building located in Pendleton, Oregon, United States. The hotel was built in 1906 by Purl Bowman (1862–1939), a member a prominent pioneer family in Pendleton. The family lived near lower Birch Creek, Oregon. Bowman was a successful farmer and wool producer. He bought the hotel property in 1900 of a house on the site burned down. His cousin, Walter S. Bowman, was a prominent professional photographer in Pendleton. The hotel was added to the National Register of Historic Places on November 6, 1980.

== History ==
When the hotel was built most visitors arrived into town by train. The Bowman Hotel closed in 1980 for renovations, ending its reign as the longest continuously operating hotel in Pendleton. The Bowman is located on the corner of South Main Street and Southwest Frazer Avenue.

== See also ==
- National Register of Historic Places listings in Umatilla County, Oregon
