= Lehman Hot Springs =

Coordinates: 45.15119°N 118.6603°W

Lehman Hot Springs is a hot springs resort in Oregon. The hot springs were used by Native Americans before European settlers arrived. A resort named Lehman Hot Springs was established in 1871. The springs are located along Oregon 244 east of Ukiah in the Blue Mountains at an elevation of 4,300 feet (1,300 m).

The family that had owned the resort for most of the 1900s repurchased the property in 2012, despite problems with some of the facilities. After extensive renovations Lehman Hot Springs is operating as a limited use facility for private organizations. It is not open to the public for daily swims. Lehman Hot Springs is the largest collection of natural hot spring pools in the Northwest.

Pendleton, Oregon photographer Walter S. Bowman captured images of bathers at the hot springs during the early 20th century, including partygoers at a masquerade.

== History ==
First used by Indians and pioneer settlers, the springs produce water at 140 to 150 °F (60 to 66 °C). The resort's swimming pools run 88 to 92 °F (31 to 33 °C) in the main pool and 100 to 106 °F (38 to 41 °C) in the small pools.

The springs closed in 1975. In 1982 a renovation and redevelopment plan was launched.

TSL Foundation, LLC purchased Lehman Hot Springs on July 19, 2012, and The Department of Environmental Quality removed the prior restrictions resulting from actions related to Patrick Lucas.

In 2013 Umatilla County Health Department licensed Lehman Hot Springs as a Limited Use pool and facility.
