= Chute dogging =

Rodeo event

Chute dogging is a rodeo event related to steer wrestling, in which the steer used weighs between 400 and 500 pounds (180 and 230 kg). However, the competitor starts the event in a bucking chute with the steer as opposed to grabbing onto the steer from horseback. The event is designed to give novices a chance to prepare for steer wrestling.

When the chute opens, the competitor must bring the steer to a line ten feet from the chute and wrestle (or "dog") the steer to the ground. In order to count as a legal fall, all four feet of the steer must be in the air when the steer is on the ground. Other falls are called "dog falls," and the competitor must try to let the steer get up and try to get all four legs in the air. The competitor can be disqualified for losing contact with the steer or tripping the steer.

It is a timed event, with the time starting at the moment the chute dogger crosses the ten-foot line. The steer must be wrestled within 60 seconds.
