= Robert A. Crosby =

American all-around cowboy

Robert Anderson Crosby (February 27, 1897 – October 20, 1947) was a three-time World All-Around Champion (1925, 1927 & 1928) and permanent holder of the Roosevelt Trophy (on display at the National Cowboy Hall of Fame) in Oklahoma City, Oklahoma, United States.

== Early life ==
Bob Crosby was born on February 27, 1897, in Midland, Texas. Crosby was raised around Kenna, New Mexico. He became an experienced cowhand there. His first time as a rodeo contestant was in 1923. He entered a rodeo competition at New York's Yankee Stadium. At 13, he won his first rodeo title. Will Rogers encouraged him to enter larger rodeos.

== Career ==
Usually he entered all events, but then just the timed ones. He won the Roosevelt Trophy the first time in 1925 by competing in two rodeos and winning the all-around events at both Cheyenne Frontier Days and the Pendleton Round-Up. He again won in 1927-1928. Winning three times establishes "permanent possession of the trophy". Fans began to know him as "Wild Horse Bob".

Crosby's featured events were roping. At Madison Square Garden, he won the calf roping title three times. At Pendleton, he won the steer roping title four times. At Cheyenne, he won the steer roping title twice. Around the 1930s and 1940s he participated in some matched steer roping events. They took place against Carl Arnold and the Weir brothers. He also owned his own ranch. The Cross B Ranch was located near Roswell, New Mexico.

Crosby wore an old black hat that represented good luck, which fans came to recognize and use as a cue to cheer. He remarked, "Someday, to their surprise, I'm going to wear my Sunday hat and see if it's the old black felt or the man they're always cheering".

== Honors ==
The ProRodeo Hall of Fame inducted Crosby in 1983. Crosby was inducted into the Pendleton Round-Up and Happy Canyon Hall of Fame in 1974. Crosby was inducted into the Rodeo Hall of Fame of the National Cowboy and Western Heritage Museum in 1966.

== Death ==
Bob Crosby died on October 20, 1947, in Roswell, New Mexico. He had an accident in a Jeep near his ranch. Crosby was declared the "King of the Cowboys" by Life magazine.
