= Cowboy Morgan Evans =

American rodeo sports cowboy and oil field worker

- 14-year-old Charlie Morgan Evans
- Born: 19 February 1903; Archer County, Texas, U.S.
- Died: April 15, 1969 (age 66); Bonham, Texas, U.S.
- Education: Huff Community Elementary, and Wichita Falls, Texas
- Occupations: Rancher, Roughneck, Oilman, Rodeo Bull rider and 1928 World Champion Bulldogger
- Known for: 1928 world Bulldogging champ, Bull rider, Rancher, Oil production Roughneck and Drilling Foreman, Christian Baptist 33°
- Spouse: Allie Odessa Jarvis
- Children: Mary Morine Evans-Penner; Sara Deane Evans
- Parent(s): Andrew Jackson Evans, Sr. Grace Morgan

Charles "Cowboy" Morgan Evans (February 19, 1903 – April 15, 1969) was an American champion rodeo cowboy and oil field worker from Texas who worked as a rancher and oil drilling foreman the majority of his life.

Evans won the 1927 World Series Rodeo Bulldogging Championship at New York City's Madison Square Garden. The World Series Rodeo is now known as the National Finals Rodeo (or "NFR"). Cowboy Evan's championship is recorded in the Rodeo Hall of Fame at the National Cowboy & Western Heritage Museum in Oklahoma City, Oklahoma.

== Early life ==
Charlie Morgan Evans was born to rancher Andrew Jackson Evans, Sr., and his wife Grace Morgan in the community of Huff, Texas in Archer County. The family was of Scottish and Welsh descent. As an adult, in 1942, Evans legally changed his birth name from Charlie to Charles, but his rodeo name was the one that stuck in the minds of those who knew him. Some oldtimers in parts of Arkansas, where he had a cattle ranch, still remembered Cowboy Morgan Evans in the local American folklore of the late 20th century.

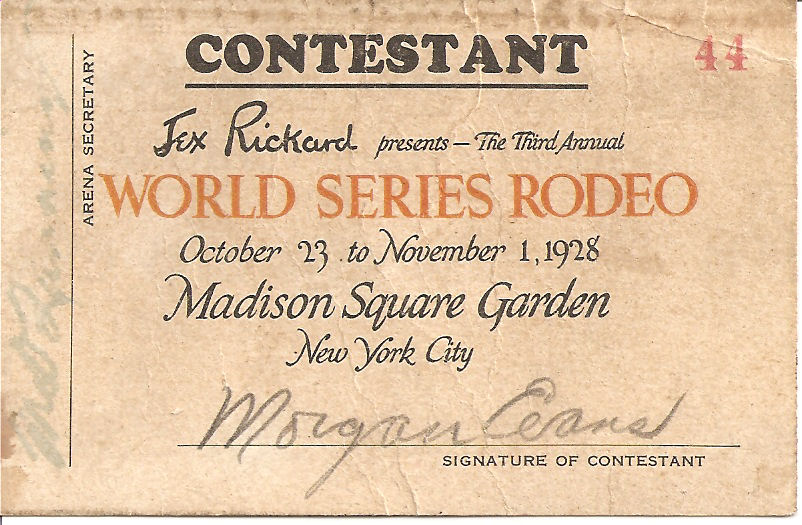
Second Annual 1928 World Series Rodeo Contestant ticket

Bulldogging photo of Cowboy Evans at Chicago Stadium (notice he has a Western riding boot on his right foot and a low quarter shoe on his left for quick competition dismount)

== Career and family ==
Cowboy Evans was known for his unique rodeo steer wrestling competition style of wearing one Western riding boot and one low quarter standard shoe for ease of quick dismount from his horse. He competed in many rodeos across the United States in both bulldogging and bull riding prior to winning the 1927 world championship. He worked as a roughneck in the oil exploration and drilling industry, and eventually became a drilling foreman and oilman. In the early 1930s, Evans toured the United States on the rodeo circuit while maintaining his home of record in Henrietta, Texas.

He married Allie Odessa Jarvis, and together they had two daughters, Mary and Sara, who now reside in Ellis County, Texas, with their daughters, Lori Hiddleston and Morgan Evans and grandsons, Matthew Hiddleston and Landon Rayford nearby. On 27 May 1945, Evans was awarded his 32nd degree in Scottish Rite Freemasonry, issued in Wichita Falls, Texas, by the Dallas Consistory. He received his 33rd degree almost two decades later. Cowboy Morgan Evans died at home in Bonham, Texas, of an apparent heart attack. He was buried in a Christian ceremony in Bonham, and his life and legacy were honored by his fellow members of Chapter 52 of the Royal Arch Masons.

== See also ==
- Equestrianism
- Freemasonry
- History of rodeo
- List of Freemasons
- List of Rodeos
- Tex Austin
