= Birch Creek (Umatilla River tributary) =

River in Oregon, United States of America

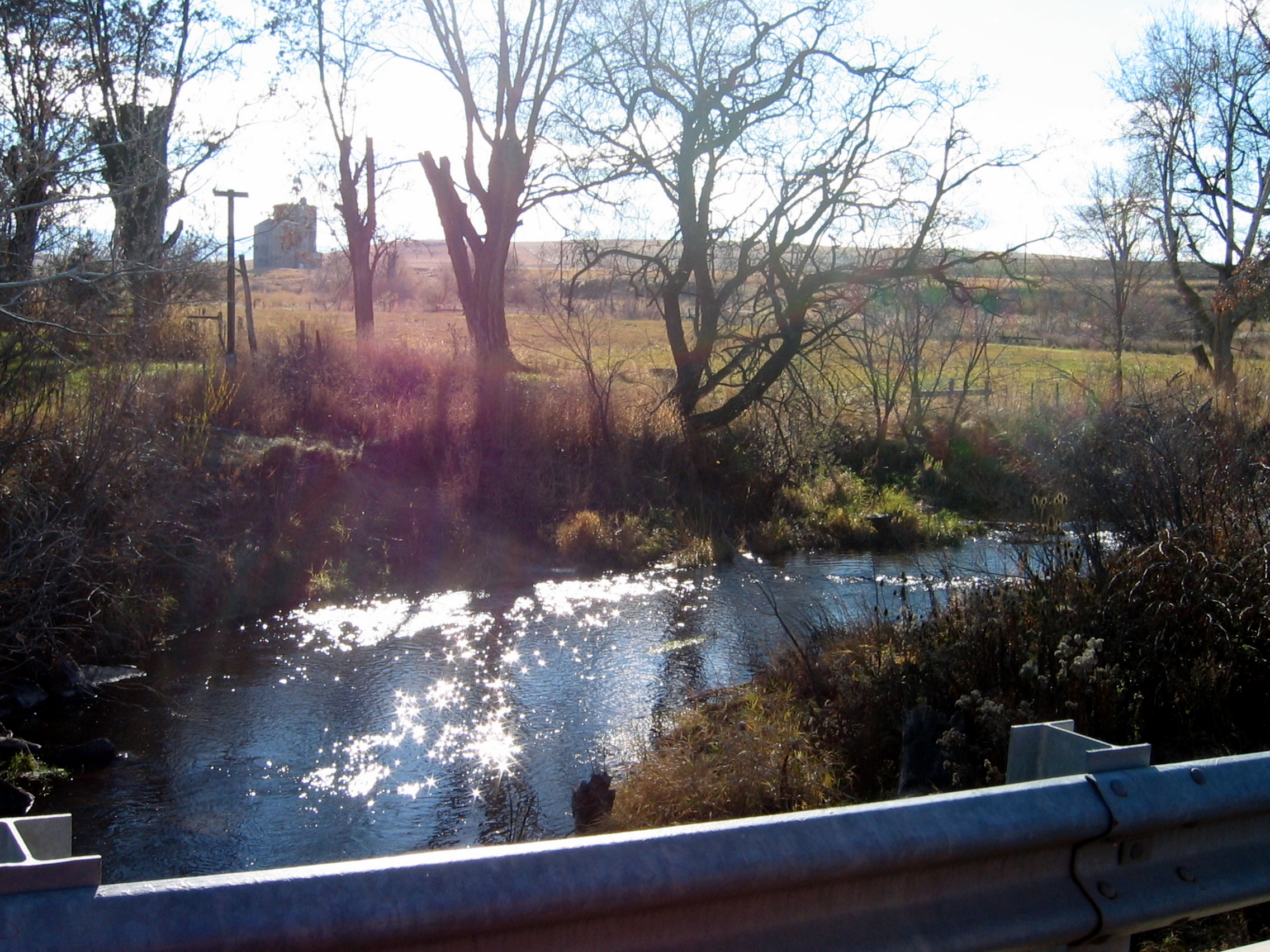
- At Hoeft Road, south of Pendleton Country Club

- Location of the mouth of Birch Creek in Oregon

Location
- Country: United States
- State: Oregon
- County: Umatilla

Physical characteristics
- Source: confluence of east and west forks
  - location: near Pilot Rock
  - coordinates: 45°29′06″N 118°50′04″W
  - elevation: 1,622 ft (494 m)
- Mouth: Umatilla River
  - location: near Rieth
  - coordinates: 45°39′19″N 118°52′54″W
  - elevation: 958 ft (292 m)
- Length: 16 mi (26 km)
- Basin size: 291 sq mi (750 km^{2})

Birch Creek is a 16-mile (26 km) tributary of the Umatilla River in eastern Oregon in the United States. It rises at the confluence of East and West Birch creeks south of Pilot Rock, Oregon, at the base of the Blue Mountains and flows north, slightly west of the city of Pendleton. It enters the Umatilla River about 49 miles (79 km) from the larger stream's confluence with the Columbia River.

Birch Creek is one of the rivers that drain Oregon's northwestern corner of the Blue Mountains, flowing alongside industrial waste ponds, and over two minor impoundments before reaching the Umatilla River. Lands in the Birch Creek drainage are used for logging, grazing, dairy farming, and factory farming. Birch Creek is a source of phosphates and the resulting eutrophication of the Umatilla River.

Pendleton photographer Walter S. Bowman is believed to have been born by Birch Creek.

Peterson dam on the creek is supposed to be removed.

== See also ==
- List of rivers of Oregon
