= Pilot Rock High School =

Location
- 101 NE Cherry Street; Pilot Rock, (Umatilla County), Oregon 97868; United States; 45.48271°N 118.83106°W

Information
- Established: 1919
- School district: Pilot Rock School District
- Principal: David Norton
- Teaching staff: 9.00 (FTE)
- Grades: 7-12
- Enrollment: 155 (2023-2024)
- Student to teacher ratio: 17.22
- Colors: Royal blue and gold
- Athletics conference: OSAA Blue Mountain Conference, 2A
- Team name: Rockets
- Website: www.pilotrock.k12.or.us

Pilot Rock High School is a public high school located in Pilot Rock, Oregon, United States. It has five buildings, which were constructed between 1919 and 1955.

== Academics ==
In 2008, 93% of the school's seniors received a high school diploma. Of 30 students, 28 graduated, one dropped out, and one received a modified diploma.
