= Elgin High School (Oregon) =

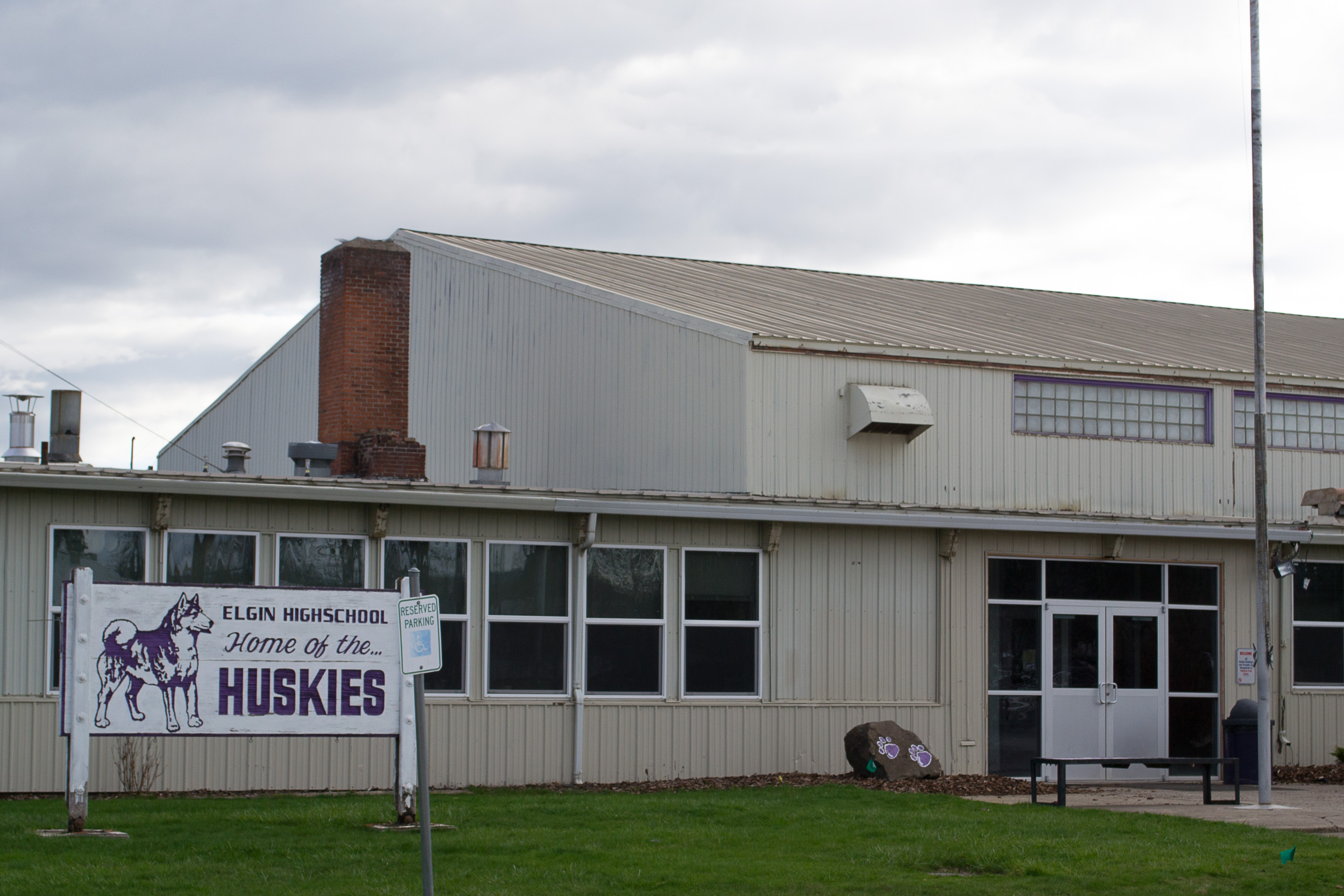

Location
- 1400 Birch Avenue; Elgin, (Union County), Oregon 97827; United States; 45.562813°N 117.923824°W

Information
- Type: Public
- School district: Elgin School District
- Principal: Dawn Guenert
- Teaching staff: 9.47 (FTE)
- Grades: 7-12
- Enrollment: 166 (2023-2024)
- Student to teacher ratio: 17.53
- Colors: Purple and white
- Athletics conference: OSAA Wapiti League 2A-6
- Mascot: Husky
- Website: Elgin HS website

Elgin High School is a public high school in Elgin, Oregon, United States.

== Academics ==
In 2008, 86% of the school's seniors received their high school diploma. Of 43 students, 37 graduated, three dropped out, and three returned for the fall semester in 2008.
