= Pilot Rock, Oregon =

- City
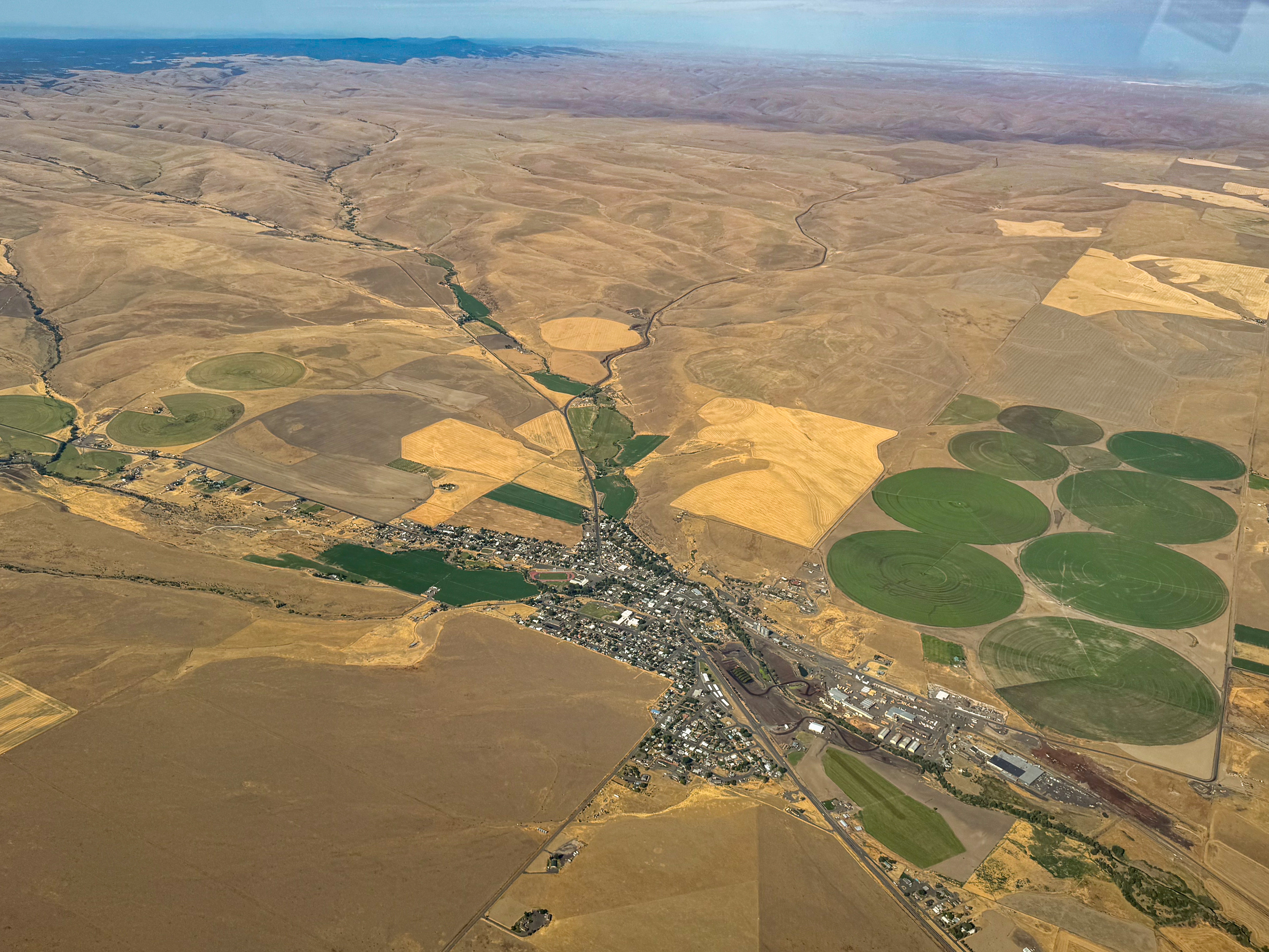
- Pilot Rock and the surrounding area
- Motto: A Home at the Base of the Blues
- Location in Oregon
- Coordinates: 45°29′25″N 118°50′05″W
- Country: United States
- State: Oregon
- County: Umatilla
- Incorporated: 1911

Government
  - Mayor: Randy Gawith

Area
  - Total: 1.47 sq mi (3.81 km^{2})
  - Land: 1.45 sq mi (3.76 km^{2})
  - Water: 0.019 sq mi (0.05 km^{2})
- Elevation: 1,631 ft (497 m)

Population (2020)
  - Total: 1,328
  - Density: 914.7/sq mi (353.18/km^{2})
- Time zone: UTC-8 (Pacific)
  - Summer (DST): UTC-7 (Pacific)
- ZIP code: 97868
- Area code: 541
- FIPS code: 41-57650
- GNIS feature ID: 2411422
- Website: www.cityofpilotrock.org

Pilot Rock is a city in Umatilla County, Oregon, United States. The population was 1,328 at the 2020 census. It is part of the Pendleton–Hermiston Micropolitan Statistical Area. The main industries are timber and agriculture. Pilot Rock is home to Pilot Rock High School. The name of Pilot Rock refers to a large basalt rock formation which is visible from the old Oregon Trail and was used in navigating wagon trains through the area.

== Geography ==
According to the United States Census Bureau, the city has a total area of 1.47 square miles (3.81 km^{2}), of which 1.45 square miles (3.76 km^{2}) is land and 0.02 square miles (0.05 km^{2}) is water.

== Climate ==
According to the Köppen Climate Classification system, Pilot Rock has a steppe climate, abbreviated BSk on climate maps.

Climate data for Pilot Rock, Oregon (1991–2020 normals, extremes 1909–2023)
Month	Jan	Feb	Mar	Apr	May	Jun	Jul	Aug	Sep	Oct	Nov	Dec	Year
Record high °F (°C)	76 (24)	79 (26)	82 (28)	94 (34)	101 (38)	112 (44)	116 (47)	111 (44)	103 (39)	92 (33)	81 (27)	72 (22)	116 (47)
Mean daily maximum °F (°C)	45.4 (7.4)	49.4 (9.7)	57.0 (13.9)	63.4 (17.4)	72.2 (22.3)	79.5 (26.4)	90.5 (32.5)	90.0 (32.2)	80.4 (26.9)	66.6 (19.2)	52.8 (11.6)	44.2 (6.8)	66.0 (18.9)
Daily mean °F (°C)	35.8 (2.1)	38.4 (3.6)	44.3 (6.8)	49.5 (9.7)	57.3 (14.1)	63.6 (17.6)	71.7 (22.1)	71.0 (21.7)	62.7 (17.1)	51.6 (10.9)	41.4 (5.2)	34.9 (1.6)	51.8 (11.0)
Mean daily minimum °F (°C)	26.3 (−3.2)	27.4 (−2.6)	31.5 (−0.3)	35.7 (2.1)	42.5 (5.8)	47.7 (8.7)	52.9 (11.6)	52.0 (11.1)	45.0 (7.2)	36.6 (2.6)	30.0 (−1.1)	25.6 (−3.6)	37.8 (3.2)
Record low °F (°C)	−21 (−29)	−19 (−28)	0 (−18)	8 (−13)	25 (−4)	28 (−2)	30 (−1)	32 (0)	19 (−7)	9 (−13)	−15 (−26)	−21 (−29)	−21 (−29)
Average precipitation inches (mm)	1.40 (36)	1.25 (32)	1.79 (45)	1.64 (42)	2.09 (53)	1.56 (40)	0.27 (6.9)	0.41 (10)	0.60 (15)	1.07 (27)	1.50 (38)	1.44 (37)	15.02 (382)
Average snowfall inches (cm)	3.7 (9.4)	2.1 (5.3)	0.5 (1.3)	0.0 (0.0)	0.0 (0.0)	0.0 (0.0)	0.0 (0.0)	0.0 (0.0)	0.0 (0.0)	0.1 (0.25)	1.1 (2.8)	2.6 (6.6)	10.1 (26)
Average precipitation days (≥ 0.01 in)	10.0	8.7	10.7	10.3	10.2	6.8	2.5	2.4	4.1	7.2	10.6	10.8	94.3
Average snowy days (≥ 0.1 in)	1.1	0.7	0.2	0.0	0.0	0.0	0.0	0.0	0.0	0.0	0.4	0.6	3.0
Source: NOAA

== Demographics ==
Historical population
Census	Pop.	Note	%±
1910	197		—
1920	361		83.2%
1930	275		−23.8%
1940	358		30.2%
1950	847		136.6%
1960	1,695		100.1%
1970	1,612		−4.9%
1980	1,630		1.1%
1990	1,478		−9.3%
2000	1,533		3.7%
2010	1,502		−2.0%
2020	1,328		−11.6%
U.S. Decennial Census

=== 2020 census ===
As of the 2020 census, Pilot Rock had a population of 1,328. The median age was 42.9 years, with 20.4% of residents under the age of 18 and 22.4% aged 65 years or older. For every 100 females there were 96.2 males, and for every 100 females age 18 and over there were 94.3 males age 18 and over.

There were 572 households in Pilot Rock, of which 28.7% had children under the age of 18 living in them. Of all households, 46.5% were married-couple households, 18.9% were households with a male householder and no spouse or partner present, and 26.6% were households with a female householder and no spouse or partner present. About 28.2% of all households were made up of individuals and 14.6% had someone living alone who was 65 years of age or older.

There were 620 housing units, of which 7.7% were vacant. Among occupied housing units, 72.9% were owner-occupied and 27.1% were renter-occupied. The homeowner vacancy rate was 1.6% and the rental vacancy rate was 6.5%.

0% of residents lived in urban areas, while 100.0% lived in rural areas.

Racial composition as of the 2020 census
Race	Number	Percent
White	1,167	87.9%
Black or African American	4	0.3%
American Indian and Alaska Native	36	2.7%
Asian	0	0%
Native Hawaiian and Other Pacific Islander	0	0%
Some other race	22	1.7%
Two or more races	99	7.5%
Hispanic or Latino (of any race)	60	4.5%

=== 2010 census ===
As of the census of 2010, there were 1,502 people, 582 households, and 416 families residing in the city. The population density was 1,035.9 inhabitants per square mile (400.0/km^{2}). There were 649 housing units at an average density of 447.6 per square mile (172.8/km^{2}). The racial makeup of the city was 93.5% White, 1.7% Native American, 1.0% from other races, and 3.7% from two or more races. Hispanic or Latino of any race were 3.2% of the population.

There were 582 households, of which 34.2% had children under the age of 18 living with them, 53.4% were married couples living together, 11.9% had a female householder with no husband present, 6.2% had a male householder with no wife present, and 28.5% were non-families. 22.9% of all households were made up of individuals, and 11.4% had someone living alone who was 65 years of age or older. The average household size was 2.58 and the average family size was 2.99.

The median age in the city was 37.9 years. 27% of residents were under the age of 18; 8.8% were between the ages of 18 and 24; 21.9% were from 25 to 44; 25.6% were from 45 to 64; and 16.8% were 65 years of age or older. The gender makeup of the city was 48.7% male and 51.3% female.

=== 2000 census ===
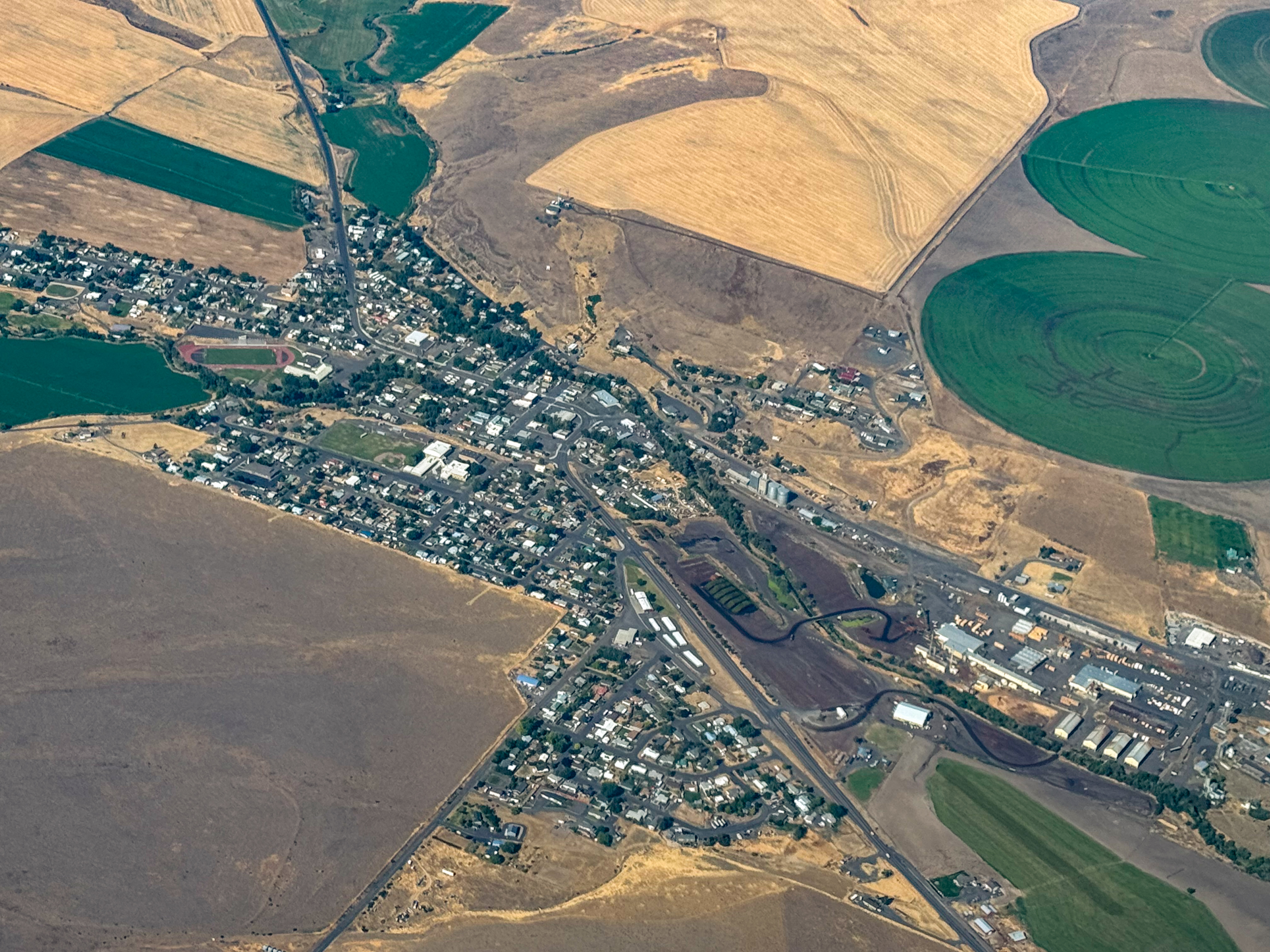
Town of Pilot Rock

As of the census of 2000, there were 1,532 people, 590 households, and 454 families residing in the city. The population density was 1,968.6 inhabitants per square mile (760.1/km^{2}). There were 630 housing units at an average density of 809.5 per square mile (312.5/km^{2}). The racial makeup of the city was 94.13% White, 0.26% African American, 2.68% Native American, 0.26% Asian, 0.65% from other races, and 2.02% from two or more races. Hispanic or Latino of any race were 1.50% of the population.

There were 590 households, out of which 35.4% had children under the age of 18 living with them, 62.4% were married couples living together, 10.3% had a female householder with no husband present, and 22.9% were non-families. 20.0% of all households were made up of individuals, and 7.8% had someone living alone who was 65 years of age or older. The average household size was 2.60 and the average family size was 2.94.

In the city, the population was spread out, with 27.9% under the age of 18, 7.0% from 18 to 24, 28.6% from 25 to 44, 21.7% from 45 to 64, and 14.9% who were 65 years of age or older. The median age was 37 years. For every 100 females, there were 94.9 males. For every 100 females age 18 and over, there were 97.0 males.

The median income for a household in the city was $34,766, and the median income for a family was $40,134. Males had a median income of $31,364 versus $19,792 for females. The per capita income for the city was $15,666. About 6.4% of families and 9.0% of the population were below the poverty line, including 9.8% of those under age 18 and 6.9% of those age 65 or over.
