= Bonnie McCarroll =

American rodeo cowgirl

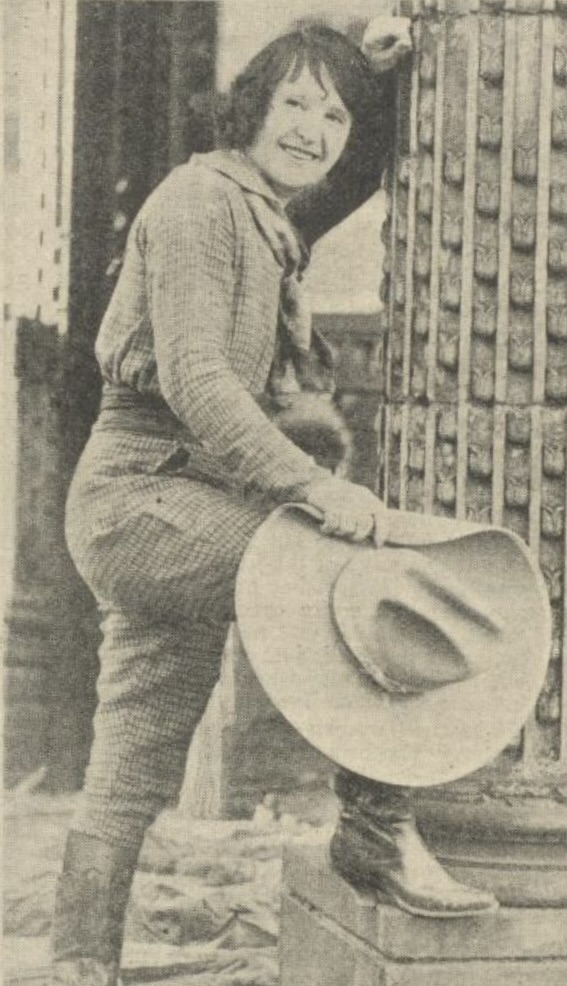
- McCarroll in 1924
- Born: Mary Ellen Treadwell; 1897 near Ola, Idaho, U.S.
- Died: September 29, 1929 (aged 32); Pendleton, Oregon, U.S.
- Occupation: Rodeo cowgirl

Mary Ellen "Bonnie" McCarroll (née Treadwell; 1897 – 29 September 1929) was an American rodeo cowgirl.

== Biography ==
Mary Ellen Treadwell was born on her grandparents' cattle ranch near Ola, Idaho in 1897. She began riding bucking horses at age 10 and entered her first rodeo in 1910, at the age of 13, in Vancouver, Washington. She met and married her husband, bulldogger Frank McCarroll, in 1915. The two lived together in Boise. She won her first title at the Pendleton Round-Up in 1921. The next year, in 1922, McCarroll became the first female rider to win the bronco riding championship at Madison Square Garden, won at Cheyenne Frontier Days, and won again at the Pendleton Round-Up. In 1924, she performed in Tex Austin's International Rodeo at Wembley Stadium in London, United Kingdom, the first international rodeo championship in the country. While there, McCarroll was awarded the Lord Selfridge Trophy. In 1927, she performed in front of President Calvin Coolidge in the Black Hills of South Dakota.

On September 19, 1929, McCarroll was competing yet again at the Pendleton Round-Up when she was thrown off her horse, a bronco named Black Cat. She sustained a major head injury and died at the age of 32 in Pendleton eleven days later. After her death, women were banned from competing in "rough stock" competitions due to safety concerns. As of 2026, the ban is upheld in most major rodeo associations.

McCarroll was inducted into the National Rodeo Hall of Fame in 2002 and the National Cowgirl Museum and Hall of Fame in 2006. She was depicted in Steve Wursta's documentary From Cheyenne to Pendleton: The Rise and Fall of the Rodeo Cowgirl in 2010.
