= Pendleton Round-Up =

Rodeo in Oregon, United States

Coordinates: 45.67°N 118.80°W

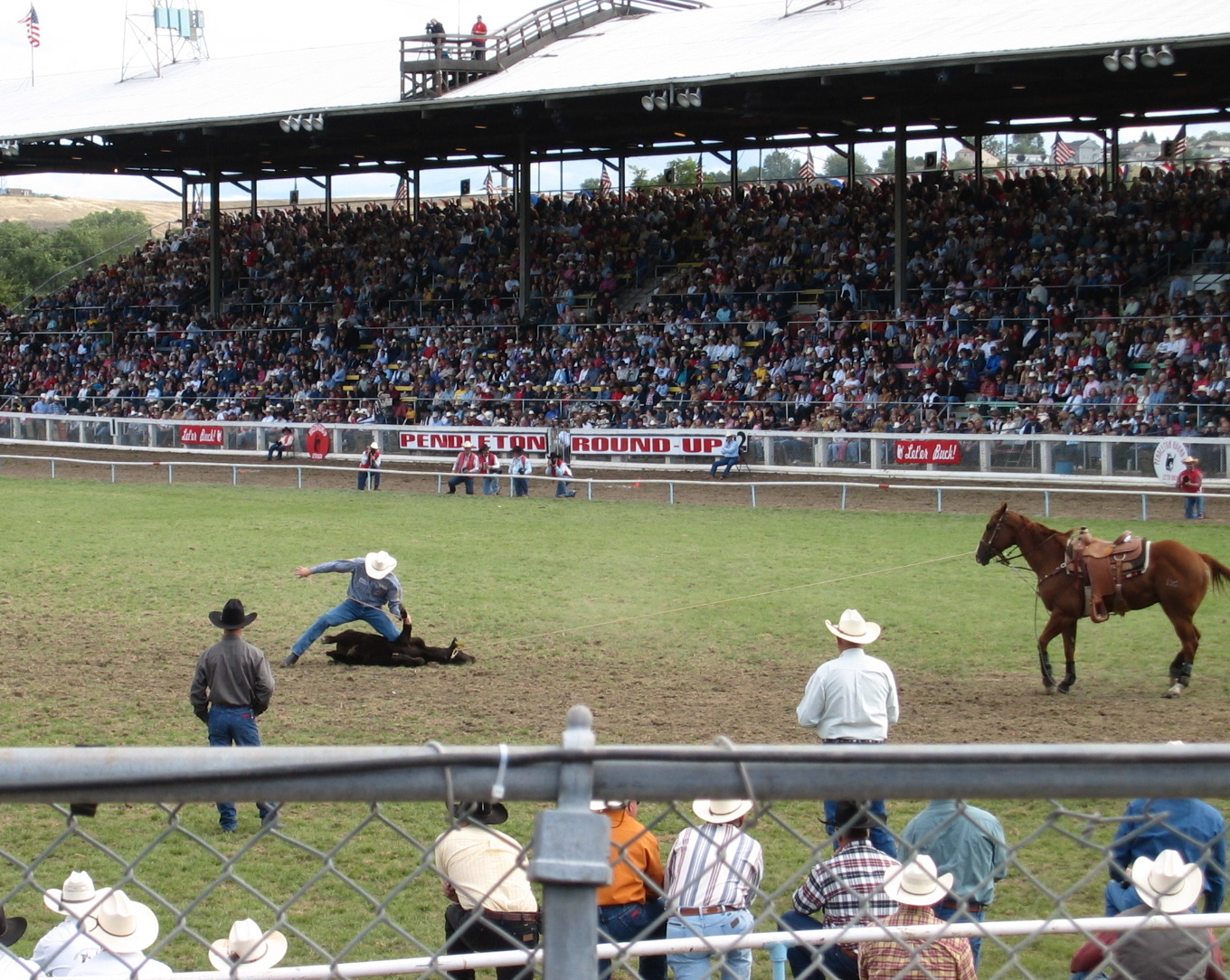
- Tie-down roping participant in 2004
- Genre: rodeo
- Begins: September
- Frequency: annual
- Locations: Pendleton, Oregon, U.S.
- Years active: 116
- Inaugurated: 1910
- Capacity: 17,000
- Website: www.pendletonroundup.com

Location in northeastern Oregon

The Pendleton Round-Up is a major annual rodeo in the northwestern United States, at Pendleton in northeastern Oregon. Held at the Pendleton Round-Up Stadium during the second full week of September each year since 1910, the rodeo brings roughly 50,000 people every year to the city. The Pendleton Round-Up is a member of the Professional Rodeo Cowboys Association (PRCA). The ProRodeo Hall of Fame in Colorado Springs, Colorado, inducted the Pendleton Round-Up in 2008.

The Round-Up was incorporated as a 501(c)(4) not-for-profit organization on July 29, 1910, as the "Northwestern Frontier Exhibition Association". The rodeo was primarily a creation of local ranchers led by Herman Rosenberg.

The Pendleton Round-Up has received the PRCA Large Outdoor Rodeo of the Year award twelve times: 2003, 2010, 2015, 2016, 2017, 2018, 2019, 2021, 2022, 2023, 2024, and 2025.

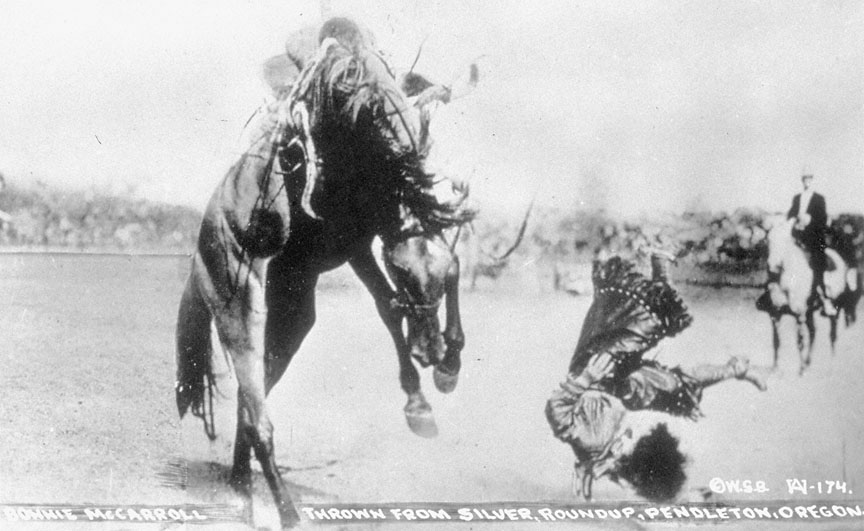
A 1915 photograph by Walter S. Bowman of Bonnie McCarroll being thrown from a horse named Silver at the Pendleton Round-Up (The National Cowgirl Museum and Hall of Fame)

Bronc rider Bonnie McCarroll (1897–1929) died in a rodeo accident at Pendleton. The PRCA, formed in 1936, initially scheduled no events for women as a result of her death.

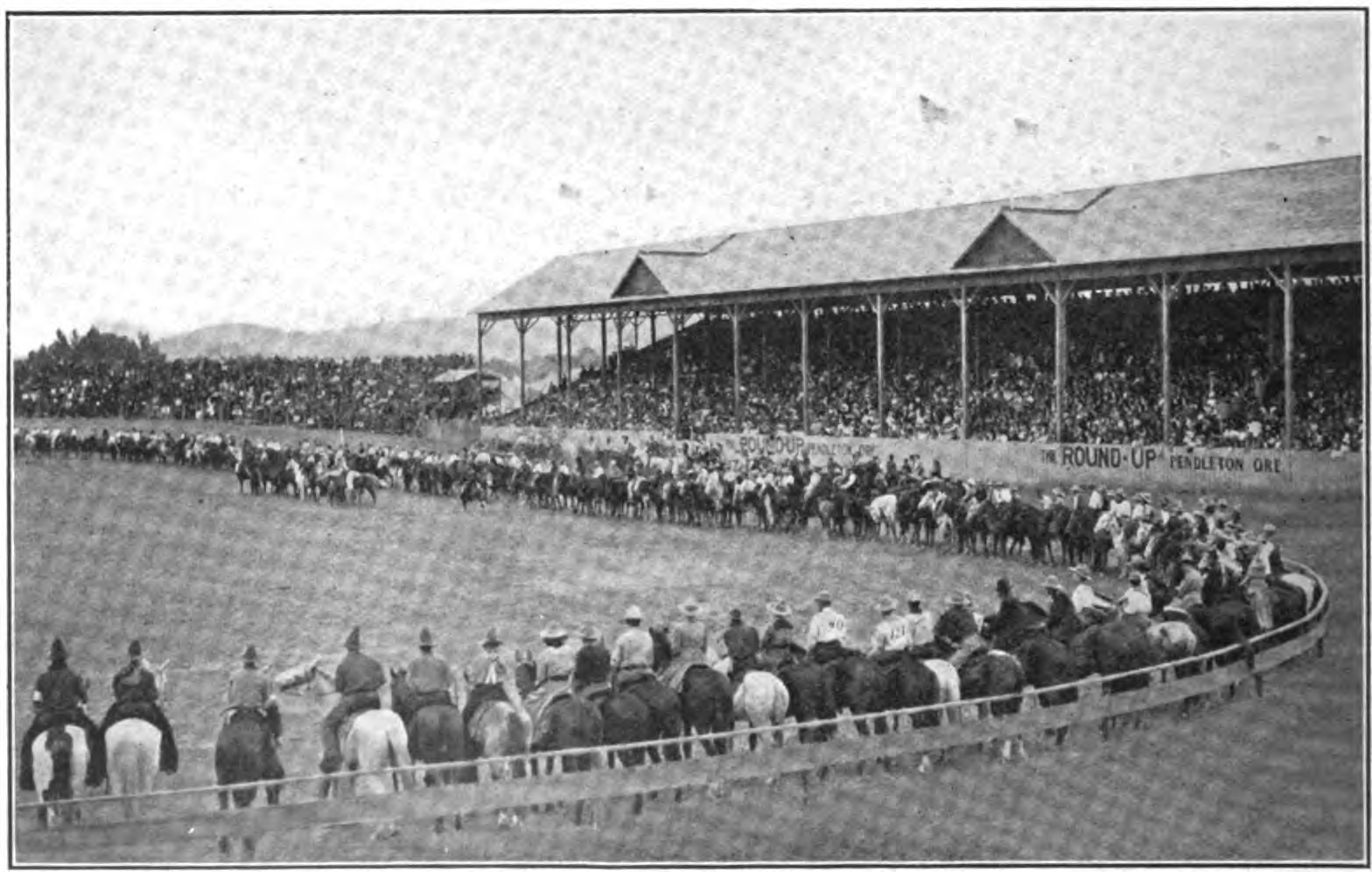
The fourth annual round-up in September 1913 drew 50,000 spectators.

== History ==
The first Pendleton Round-up was held in 1910, born of a "communistic" desire to establish a city park for Pendleton. It was an immediate success, and grew in scale dramatically in each of its first several years.

A half-mile “Indian Race” was listed in the first program of the Pendleton Round-Up in 1910. In 1913, the first actual Indian relay appeared in rodeo programs.

The only cancellations happened in 1943, 1944 (both due to World War II), and 2020 (due to the COVID-19 pandemic).

== Events ==
There are 11 events in which cowboys (and cowgirls in barrel racing and breakaway roping) from all over the United States and Canada compete. The All-Around Cowboy is awarded to the competitor who wins the most money in the required number of events.

- Bareback riding
- Saddle bronc riding
- Tie-down roping
- Team roping
- Steer wrestling
- Barrel racing
- Breakaway roping
- Steer roping
- Bull riding
- Indian Relay
- Wild cow milking

== Round-Up week ==
Every Round-Up week begins with the Dress Up Parade, on the Saturday before the rodeo, in which different groups throughout Eastern Oregon, including Boy and Girl Scouts, Pendleton High School Band, the Children's Rodeo, and many local businesses, build floats and compete for 1st place.

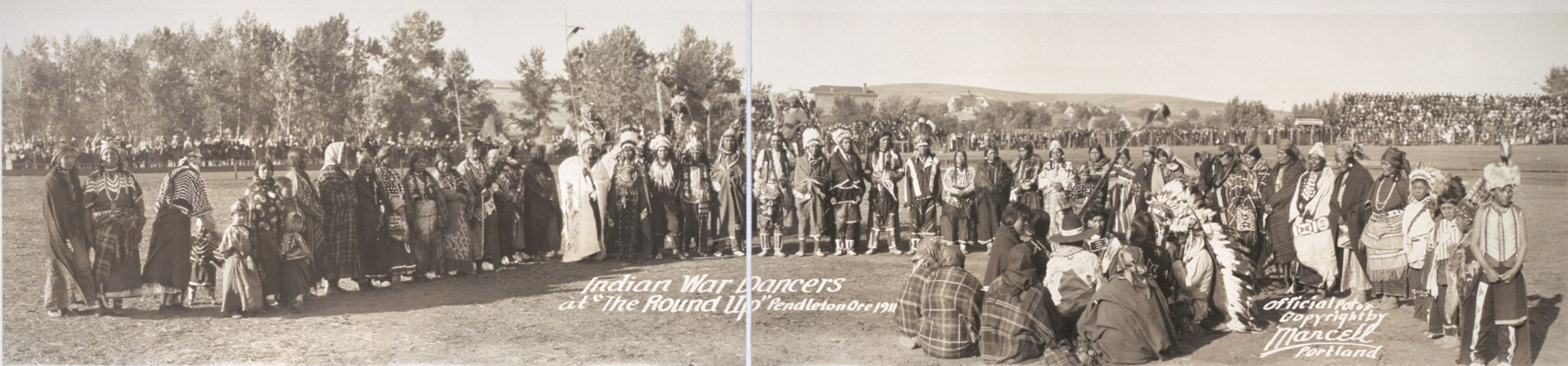
"Indian War Dancers" at the 1911 Round-Up

The Happy Canyon Indian Pageant and Wild West Show was designated the state's official outdoor pageant in 2017.

Friday of Round-Up week is the Westward Ho! parade, in which every entrant must be in a non-motorized vehicle, most of which are authentic covered wagons and horse-drawn buggies, though some choose to ride horseback or walk.

Since 2021, the Monday and Tuesday before the rodeo begins, the PRCA Xtreme Bulls Tour Finale takes place at the Happy Canyon Arena. Previously, the Professional Bull Riders (PBR) held an event at said venue the Monday and Tuesday before the rodeo began for several years.

Wednesday is when both Round-Up and Happy Canyon begin.

== Grand entry ==
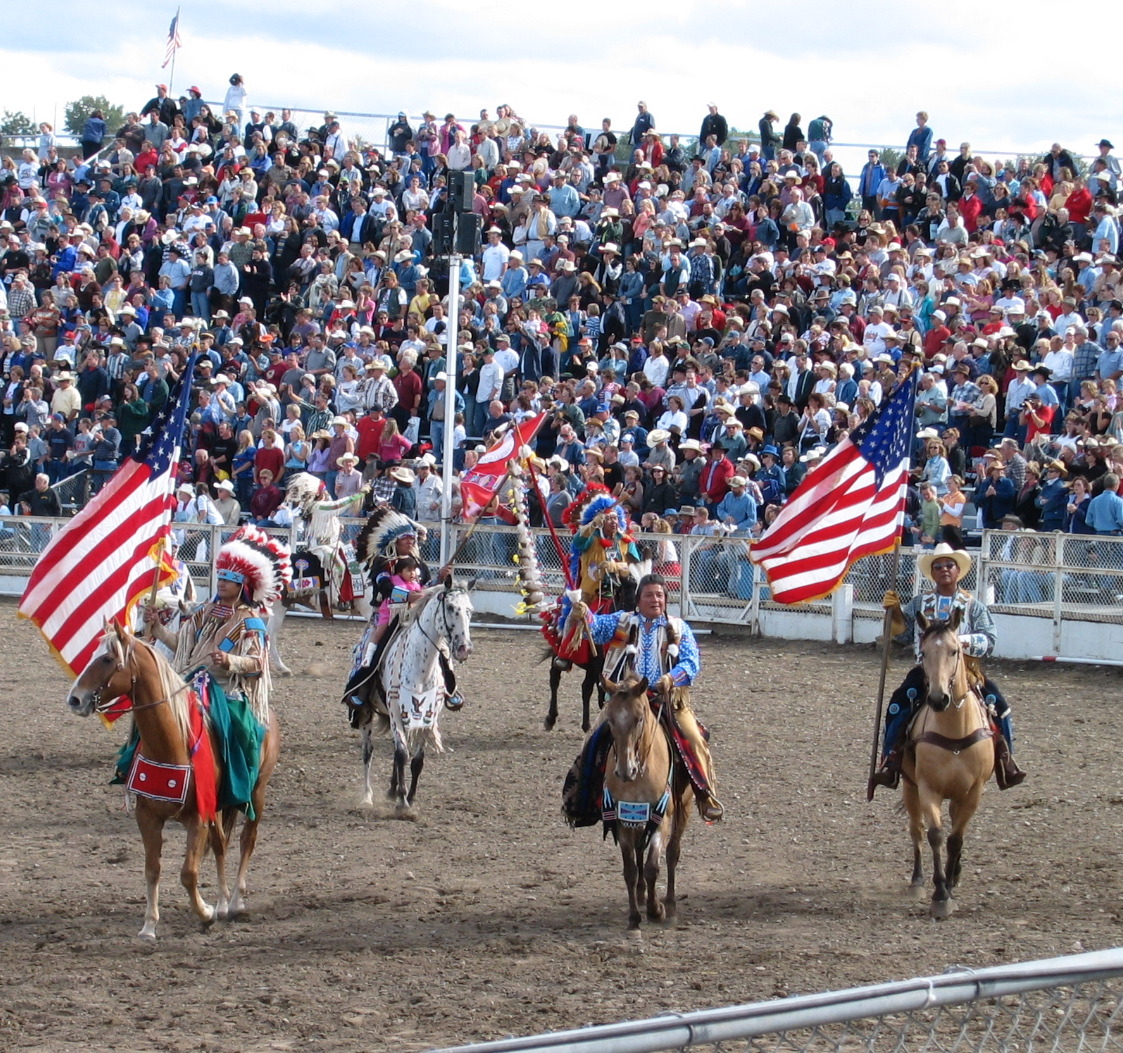
Part of the 2004 Grand Entry parade

The rodeo starts with an extreme run in on horseback of flag bearers; the Flag of the United States, the Flag of Oregon, the Flag of Canada, and the flag of the Confederated Tribes of the Umatilla Indian Reservation, then the Round-Up Queen and her court run in on their horses at full speed, make two jumps and stop just before the fence in front of the south grandstand.

== Personnel ==
The current announcer of the Pendleton Round-Up is Wayne Brooks, while the bullfighters are Dusty Tuckness, Nate Jestes and Cody Webster.

== Grand Final Review ==
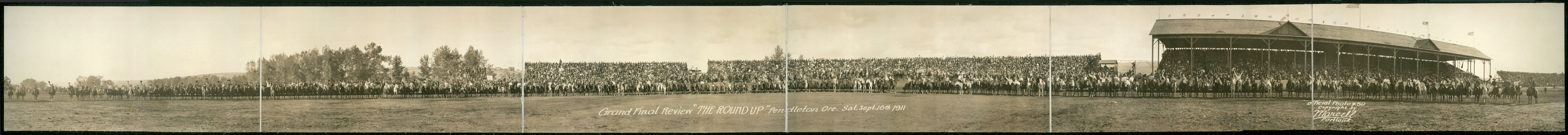
Panorama of the Grand Final Review at the 1911 Round-Up

== See also ==
- Let 'er Buck (1925)
- Pendleton Round-Up and Happy Canyon Hall of Fame
- Last Go Round
