= Steer wrestling =

Rodeo event

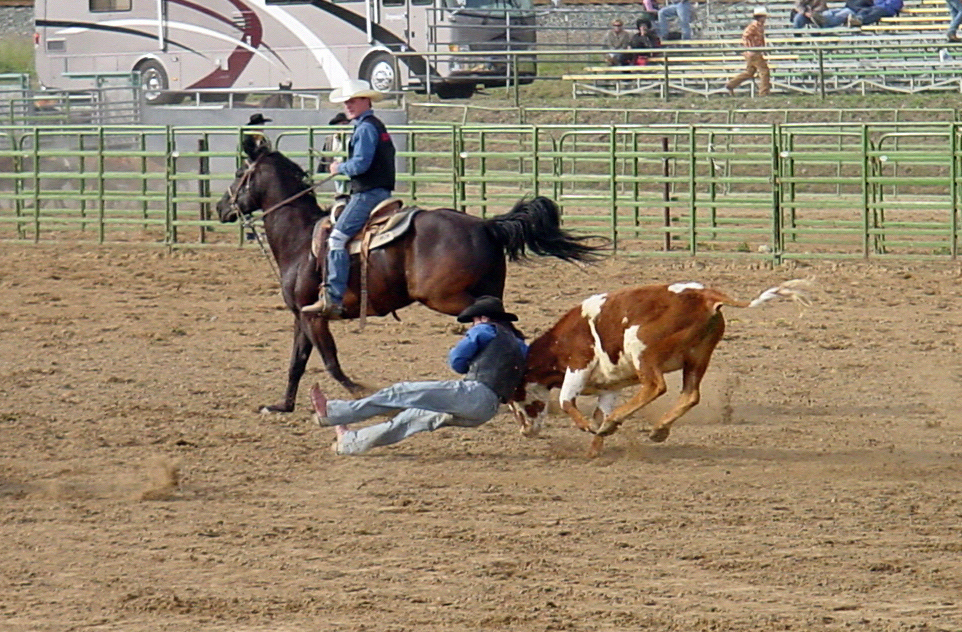
Steer wrestling at the CalPoly rodeo

Steer wrestling, also known as bulldogging, is a rodeo event in which a horse-mounted rider chases a steer, drops from the horse to the steer, then wrestles the steer to the ground by grabbing its horns and pulling it off-balance so that it falls to the ground. The event carries a high risk of injury to the cowboy. Some concerns from the animal-rights community express that the competition may include practices that constitute cruelty to animals, but the injury rate to animals is less than 0.05%. A later PRCA survey of 60,971 animal performances at 198 rodeo performances and 73 sections of "slack" indicated 27 animals were injured, again around 0.05%.

== Origins ==
Cowboy Morgan Evans, 1927 world-champion bulldogger

The origins of steer wrestling or "bulldogging" date back to Ancient Greece in bull-fighting events known as taurokathápsia (ταυροκαθάψια), where bull fighters on horseback would chase a bull and jump on it, grasping its horns before wrestling it to the ground. In The Garland of Phillip, Philippus of Thessalonica recounts how the bullfighters of Thessaly performed this feat:

The well-mounted troupe of bull-fighters from Thessaly, armed against the beasts with no weapons but their hands, spur their horses to run alongside the galloping bull, bent on throwing round its neck the noose of their arms. At the same time pulling it towards the ground by thus hanging themselves at the end of its neck and weighing down its head, they roll over even such a powerful brute”

Historically, steer wrestling was not a part of ranch life. The event originated in the 1890s and was invented by Bill Pickett, a legendary Black cowboy and Wild West show performer who invented the technique known as "bulldogging."

== Modern event ==
The event features a steer and two mounted cowboys, along with a number of supporting characters. The steers are moved through narrow pathways leading to a chute with spring-loaded doors. A barrier rope is fastened around the steer's neck, which is used to ensure that the steer gets a head start. The rope length is determined by arena length. On one side of the chute is the "hazer", whose job is to ride parallel with the steer once it begins running and ensure it runs in a straight line. On the other side of the chute, the "steer wrestler" or "bulldogger" waits behind a taut rope fastened with an easily broken string fastened to the rope on the steer.

When the steer wrestler is ready, he "calls" for the steer by nodding his head and the chute man trips a lever opening the doors. The suddenly freed steer breaks out running, shadowed by the hazer. When the steer reaches the end of his rope, it pops off and simultaneously releases the barrier for the steer wrestler. The steer wrestler attempts to catch up to the running steer, lean over the side of the horse which is running flat out, and grab the horns of the running steer. The steer wrestler then is pulled off his horse by the slowing steer and plants his heels into the dirt, further slowing the steer and himself. He then takes one hand off the horns, reaches down and grabs the nose of the steer pulling the steer off balance and ultimately "throwing" the steer to the ground. Once all four legs are off the ground, an official waves a flag marking the official end and a time is taken. The steer is released and trots off.

=== Technique ===
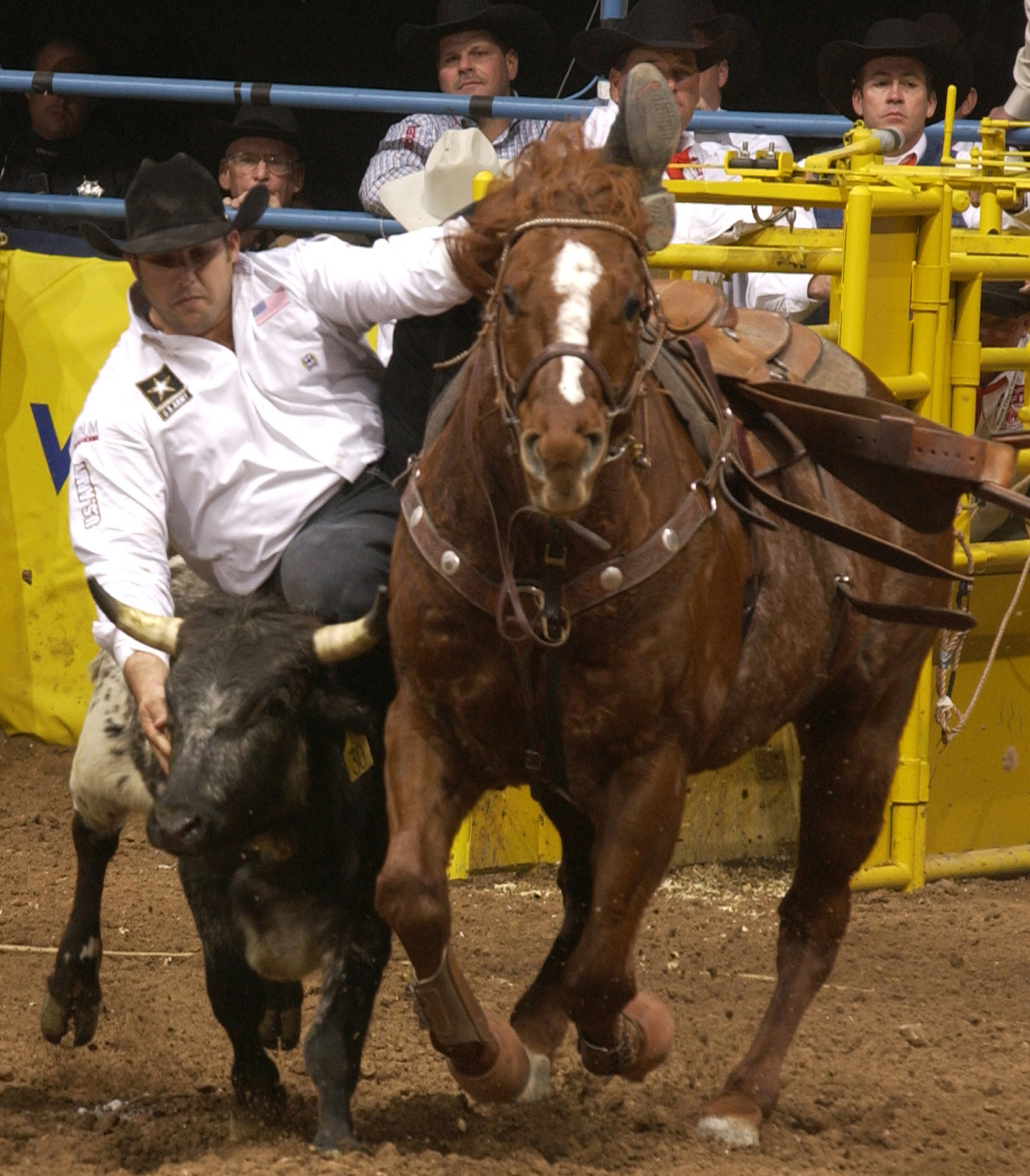
Bringing the steer to the ground

The original method of wrestling the steer to the ground is to lean from the galloping horse running beside the steer, giving the weight of the upper body to the neck to the steer with one hand on the near horn of the steer and the far horn grasped in the crook of the other elbow. One then lets the horse carry his feet by the steer until his feet naturally fall out of the stirrups. The steer wrestler then slides with his feet turned slightly to the left, twisting the head of the steer toward one by pushing down with the near hand and pulling up and in with the far elbow. Finally, the steer wrestler lets go of the near horn, and puts the steer's nose in the crook of his left elbow and throws his weight backwards, causing the steer to become unbalanced and fall to the ground.

=== Rules ===
Rules of steer wrestling include:

- The bulldogger's horse must not break the rope barrier in front of it at the beginning of a run, but must wait for the animal escaping from the adjacent chute to release the rope. Breaking the rope barrier early adds a 10-second penalty to the bulldogger's time.
- If the steer stumbles or falls before the bulldogger brings it down, he must either wait for it to rise or help it up before wrestling it to the ground.
- Should the bulldogger completely miss the steer on his way down, he will receive a "no time".

Typical professional times are in the range of 3.0 to 10 seconds from the gates opening to the waving of the flag. The steers used today are generally corriente cattle or longhorns, which weigh between 450 and 650 pounds, and the human steer wrestlers typically weigh 180 to 300 pounds. While steer wrestlers have a lower injury rate than bull riders or bronc riders, their injury rate is higher than those of the speed events.

== Animal-welfare concerns ==
Like all other rodeo events, steer wrestling is criticised by animal-rights advocates. Modern rodeos in the United States are closely regulated and have responded to accusations of animal cruelty by instituting a number of rules to guide how rodeo animals are to be managed. In 1994, a survey of 28 sanctioned rodeos was conducted by on-site independent veterinarians. Reviewing 33,991 animal runs, the injury rate was documented at 16 animals or 0.047%, less than one in 2000 animals. A study of rodeo animals in Australia found a similar injury rate. Basic injuries occurred at a rate of 0.072%, or one in 1405, with injuries requiring veterinary attention at 0.036%, or one injury in every 2810 times the animal was used, and transport, yarding, and competition were all included in the study. A later PRCA survey of 60,971 animal performances at 198 rodeo performances and 73 sections of "slack" indicated 27 animals were injured, again around 0.05%.

However, accusations of cruelty in the USA persist. The PRCA acknowledges that they only sanction about 30% of all rodeos, while another 50% are sanctioned by other organizations and 20% are completely unsanctioned. Several animal-rights organizations keep records of accidents and incidents of possible animal abuse. They cite various specific incidents of injury to support their statements, and also point to examples of long-term breakdown, as well as reporting on injuries and deaths suffered by animals in nonrodeo events staged on the periphery of professional rodeo such as chuckwagon races and "suicide runs". In terms of actual statistics on animal injury rate, no more recent independent studies are apparent on animal injury in rodeo than the 1994 study. Groups such as People for the Ethical Treatment of Animals (PETA), though, periodically record incidents of animal injury. According to the ASPCA, practice sessions are often the scene of more severe abuses than competitions.

== See also ==
- 101 Ranch Wild West Show
- Chute dogging
- National Cowboy & Western Heritage Museum
- Bill Pickett
- Rodeo
- Wild West show
