= J.W. Harris (bull rider) =

American bull rider

Personal information
- Full name: James William Harris
- Nickname: J.W.
- Born: July 14, 1986 (age 40) Coleman, Texas, U.S.
- Height: 5 ft 10 in (1.78 m) (2017)
- Weight: 160 lb (73 kg) (2017)

Sport
- Sport: Rodeo
- Event: Bull riding
- Turned pro: 2005
- Retired: 2021

Achievements and titles
- Highest world ranking: 4× PRCA Bull Riding World Champion; 2014 PBR Rookie of the Year

James William Harris, known as J.W. Harris (born July 14, 1986) is an American former professional rodeo cowboy who specialized in bull riding. He competed in the Professional Rodeo Cowboys Association (PRCA), Championship Bull Riding (CBR), and Professional Bull Riders (PBR) circuits. He won the PRCA bull riding world championship four times at the National Finals Rodeo (NFR). Harris is the first bull rider since Don Gay to win four PRCA bull riding world titles. He is also the first since Gay to win three of them consecutively. Harris was also the 2014 PBR Rookie of the Year.

== Early life and family ==
James William Harris was born on July 14, 1986, in Coleman, Texas. He was named after a roughstock rider, James Garlick, and his own great-grandfather, William. His father, Mark, was the PRCA Texas Circuit Rookie of the Year in 1989. Harris was raised in Peaster, Texas, because his father was employed on a ranch there. When Harris was 15 years old, the family moved to May, Texas. He was one of an 18-person graduating class at May High School.

All of Harris' family are rodeo people. He sat his first bull when he was four years old. When he was 18 years old, Harris also experimented with saddleback bronc riding and bareback bronc riding, but discovered he did not have the temperament for it, so he decided to focus on bull riding.

== Career ==
In 2004, Harris hit the semi-professional rodeo trail for the Cowboys Professional Rodeo Association (CPRA), won the year-end bull riding championship for said organization, and won $6,501.23 prize money. The next year, he started competing professionally. He competed in the PRCA from 2005 to 2014. Starting in 2007, Harris joined the PBR tour, in one of the lower-level tours; the Challenger Tour. He competed on the Built Ford Tough Series (BFTS) from 2014 to 2017. He competed on the CBR tour from 2005 to 2014, then again in 2018. In January 2018, he announced he would retire from the PBR and return to the PRCA. Going forward in 2018, Harris would compete solely in the PRCA.

=== 2005–06 seasons ===
Harris joined the PRCA in 2005. In his first year as a professional he managed on little money for expenses. Following a no score in Nampa, Idaho, he ran out of money for expenses. His uncle paid when they needed money to drive to Cheyenne Frontier Days. On Championship Day, he won the championship round. He finished second in the average. He won $10,000 that day and bought take-out for his uncle. This was the first year Harris made the CBR final year-end World Standings. Also this year, Harris joined the CBR televised tour. For the next nine years, he finished among the top ten.

In 2006, it was at the PRCA Xtreme Bulls event in Reno, Nevada, that he made a qualified ride on the bull Werewolf for 96 points which brought him into the forefront of bull riding. A69 Werewolf, a double bred Naccarato bull, was a finalist in the PRCA and PBR in the same year, a rare accomplishment.

=== 2007–08 seasons ===
On January 17, 2007, at the Fort Worth Stock Show and Rodeo in Fort Worth, Texas, a relatively unknown 20-year-old J.W. Harris won the PRCA Xtreme Bulls riding event. Most of the observers that day had never seen him perform. "I've never heard of him...But, if he keeps riding like he did tonight, he's going to have a good future," said Don Gay, an eight-time PRCA bull-riding world champion. Gay also commented that Harris's riding would improve as he matured. He added that he would become more educated on injuries. "He's going to get better at taking care of himself," Gay said. "When you are young, you don't think about that so much. But as you mature, you learn how to do that because you know that there is no check coming in when you are sitting on the sidelines. I really like J.W. Mostly because of his attitude. He believes in himself and in what he can do." Gay became more convinced of Harris' "outstanding" capabilities at an Xtreme Bulls event in Reno, Nevada, where Gay was broadcasting for ESPN. "He rode Werewolf on a reride he didn't have to take," Gay recalls. "He scored a 96, and stole the show. That really impressed me."

In February at a PRCA Xtreme Bulls event in San Antonio, Texas, Harris received his worst injury of his career in 2008. "I guess my worst injury was (when) I had a bull crush the left side of my face last year in San Antonio. They had to put plates and screws and all kinds of good stuff in there". After he received five concussions this season, he started wearing a helmet and believed he started becoming more successful. He was the second world champion bull rider after BJ Schumacher in 2006 to do so.

At the National Finals Rodeo (NFR) at the Thomas & Mack Center in Las Vegas, Nevada, Harris made qualified rides on six of his 10 bulls at the finals for an aggregate score of 507 points, which brought him past leader Chance Smart in the World Standings in the Average. Smart rode only three of his bulls, which earned him only $36,644 and secured second place. Harris secured $96,364 in average earnings. He finished the season with total winnings of $208,437, which was enough to earn him his first PRCA bull riding world championship. The PRCA champion is decided on earnings, not points, unlike the PBR. "This was my childhood dream," said Harris. "That's all I ever wanted to do was win the world." Harris achieved the honor in his third trip to the NFR. Now I just need seven more to catch Don (Gay)," he said.

=== 2009 season ===
Harris either won first place or tied for it in 15 rodeos, including notable ones at San Antonio, Texas; Fort Worth Texas; and Reno, Nevada. Harris claimed he was far ahead of the other contestants due to riding more than half of his bulls. However, on July 20, at the Days of '47 Rodeo in Salt Lake City, Utah, on its opening round, he recorded a no score.

As of September 3, Harris led the World Standings with $162,186 in earnings. He earned $2,503 in the Wrangler Million Dollar Tour portion of the Kitsap County Stampede the weekend before. Wrangler Million Dollar points counted toward the Justin Boots Championship located in Omaha, Nebraska, the Wrangler tour points did not. Despite his successes, Harris maintains that life on the rodeo tour with "the guys" is the best part of bull riding. "They are your extended family", he said. "They are your best friends; you can count on them for anything".

At the NFR, Harris won the bull riding world championship. It was his second in a row. He broke his hand in the second ride and did not get a qualified ride on any of his bulls. It was only through his $108,004 lead coming into the NFR that he was able to pull off the win. He won the championship despite failing to earn any money during the first nine rounds of the NFR.

The year 2009 was his best finish in the CBR circuit, which was 4th place. Most of his CBR fans expected a higher ranking due to his winning and high-placing at several, and later on winning the first round of the CBR World Finals and eventually the event average, which allowed him a spin on the bounty bull.

=== 2010 season ===
On October 29, in Kansas City, Missouri, in Kemper Arena, at the American Royal, at his last competition before the NFR, Harris completed an 89-point ride on Stace Smith Pro Rodeo's For Real and it brought him $9,419 in winnings. It was enough to win the American Royal, a Gold event on the Wrangler Million Dollar Tour. He beat Chad Denton and 19-year-old Jacob O'Mara by two points to get it.

Harris entered the NFR in 8th place, about $50,000 behind the leader Wesley Silcox. On December 9, Harris won the 7th go-round. This was his third consecutive victory. He rode Frontier Rodeo's Smoke Screen for a score of 94.5 points, only 1.5 points shy of the arena record. From among 15 competitors, he was the only one with six eight-second rides. "It's the highest score I've had at the Finals and third highest I've ever been". said Harris, whose NFR total of $92,644 was second among the 119 competitors.

On Friday night, December 10, in Round 9 of the NFR, Harris claimed his third consecutive bull riding world championship. He placed second in the 9th round with an 89.5 point ride on Insaniac. It was his seventh qualified ride, and two more than any other rider in the first nine rounds. He also won the NFR Average championship. His total season earnings were $194,287, plus $44,910 or more from Saturday night. Harris broke B.J. Schumacher's NFR earnings record from 2006 of $142,644 since he had earned $106,484 at the NFR plus at least $44,910 on Saturday night. He rode seven of 10 bulls and won four rounds. He won $158,738 that year to conclude the NFR with $246,541 in total earnings combined season plus NFR earnings. He rallied from 8th in the World Standings to win and set a world record in NFR winnings. He was the first bull rider to win three world titles, and also consecutively, since 8-time champion Don Gay.

=== 2011–12 seasons ===
On January 29, 2011, at a Cinch CBR Tour event at the Lea County Event Center in Hobbs, New Mexico, Harris won the event. He made a qualified ride on the bull Psycho Todd for a score of 88 points in the long round. Then, in the championship round, he made a very high 91 point ride on the bull Directory Assistance. The combined score of 179 points was more than he needed to be proclaimed the winner. Along with the winner's check, J.W. Harris received a Resistol 20X cowboy hat as well as a Henry custom CBR Golden Boy rifle. Harris told CBR President Tuff Hedeman that "It's awesome to get off to a great start to the year and ride in front of all these great fans in Hobbs. It couldn't be any better."

In May 2011, Harris won another Cinch CBR Tour event; this time the George Paul Memorial Bull Riding at the Val Verde County Fairgrounds in Del Rio, Texas.

Shane Proctor entered the 2011 NFR with what some said was "an insurmountable lead". Harris spent the NFR eroding Proctor's lead until he was only $20,000 away from that lead entering the 10th round. However, Proctor still won the championship, even though he broke his left arm entered into the last event.

In July 2012, Harris won the first round of the CBR World Finals at Cheyenne Frontier Days, which allowed him a spin on the bounty bull. He made a qualified ride, and drove his newly won Mahindra Max Tractor out of the arena. Harris would later end up finishing second in the CBR World Finals event average.

In Round 1 of the 2012 NFR, Harris took the lead with a 90.5 point ride aboard Four Star Rodeo's bull Stink Eye. He came into the NFR only a bit more than $7,000 behind long-time World Standings leader rookie Cody Teel. Teel answered with a qualified ride that brought him 4th place. Teel rode Gauteraux's Iron Horse for 74.5 points and earned $167.225. Had Harris won this NFR, it would have been his fourth title. Harris moved from second place to first by earning $18,257 and earned a total of $170,886. Ultimately, Teel won the championship in his rookie year.

=== 2013 season ===
Harris went back to riding with a cowboy hat this season. He had been wearing a helmet since 2008 due to five concussions. His example had contributed to the number of riders wearing helmets, but now Harris said that he received concussions even while wearing a helmet, and that helmets can't prevent concussions no matter how they are designed.

On Friday night, December 13, at the NFR, in Round 9, Harris tied for 1st place and won his fourth bull riding world championship. Harris rode the bull Little Shyster for 87.5 points to tie with Trevor Kastner's ride on the bull Fire Show. Harris earned $16,677 to bring his season total to $214,067. His NFR total earnings after Round 9 were $83,684, which put him in 1st place. He placed second in the aggregate with 518.5 points for six rides.

The winner of the last two rounds prior to Round 9, Cody Teel, came in fifth in Round 9 with a 77.5 point score on the bull Seminole Wind. Teel led the aggregate with 575 points for seven rides. No one would have been able to catch him in Round 10, so he won the NFR Average title. Since Teel was second in the World Standings counting season and NFR earnings with $165,179, he could not have earned enough in Round 10 to catch Harris. Thus, Harris was declared the winner after Round 9, even though there was one round remaining. After Round 10, Harris won total earnings of $252,829, clearly the outstanding winner. Harris matched another record with Don Gay, this time by becoming the first bull rider to win four world championships since Don Gay.

=== 2014 season ===
On Saturday night, February 1, Harris competed in the PRCA Xtreme Bulls Tour. The event took place in the Rushmore Civic Center at the Black Hills Stock Show & Rodeo in Rapid City, South Dakota. Harris made the best two qualified rides of the event – a 92-point ride in the long round and an 89-point ride on Sutton Rodeo's Crystal Springs Peach in the championship round – to claim the title in the 2014 Rapid City Xtreme Bulls event.

On Saturday night, May 31, the J.W. Hart PBR Challenge began in Decatur, Texas. Even though it was a Touring Pro Division event, it was run like an elite tour event, with top-ranked bulls lined up. This year, PBR world champion J.B. Mauney and J.W. Harris were matched against 2012 PBR World Champion Bull Asteroid, and 2013 PRCA Bull of the Year Shepherd Hills Tested. Hart put up $25,000 in a 1,000 Miles From Home $25,000 winner-take-all challenge. The PBR selected the bulls they regarded as the toughest: 2013 PRCA Bull of the Year Shepherd Hills Tested had a 94.74 buck off percentage. 2012 PBR World Champion Bull Asteroid had been ridden only a couple of times. Asteroid threw Mauney in two seconds and scored 46 bull points. Shepherd Hills Tested threw Harris in 6.17 seconds and scored 45 bull points. Harris almost made a qualified ride.

On Friday, June 13, Harris and three-time World Champion Bull Bushwacker met up for a $50,000 matchup at Chad Berger's DCB PBR Bull Riding Challenge in Bismarck, North Dakota, a PBR Touring Pro Division event. When the gate opened, Bushwacker pitched Harris to the ground in less than 4 seconds. "I left good with him," Harris said. "I didn’t let him beat me out of (the chute), and just right where he threw me off, I just set my hips too soon and raised up too soon. He just kept dropping and just pushed me over his head". Bushwacker's owner, Julio Moreno, earned $10,000 for the buckoff. No buckoff time was officially recorded because the matchup was an exhibition. Berger had doubled the bounty to $100,000 a few days ago.

Harris made some headway in the PRCA field in August with three victories. He entered three rodeos in one weekend at the beginning of August and won them all. One of the victories was a high 93-point ride on Rafter H Rodeo Livestock's bull Stiff Drink at the Sikeston, Missouri, Jaycee Bootheel Rodeo, who was very rank and he had always wanted to attempt. The ride tied for the best bull ride of 2014 and earned him $4,780. Harris regained the lead from PRCA rookie Sage Kimzey on August 4, and it was his first time in the lead since February 24. Harris rode Pete Carr Pro Rodeo's bull Thunder Cat for 91 points at the Lea County Fair and Rodeo in Lovington, New Mexico, to win that event and $5,076. Then he rode Pete Carr Pro Rodeo's bull Bowser for 84-points at the Riding Club PRCA Rodeo in Crossett, Arkansas, to earn $3,158. Counting his two 90+ rides in August, Harris had 89 rides that were scored over 90 points, which at the time was a record.

On August 31, 2014, in Thackerville, Oklahoma, was the first time Harris met up with the notable, unridden Mick E. Mouse. After watching João Ricardo Viera and J.B. Mauney select two of the hardest bulls in the championship round, Harris used his third draft pick to select Mick E. Mouse, another difficult bull. He could have selected an easier bull as he had only ridden one bull in the last 10 BFTS events. That 86.75 point ride on Jo Jo was the second-highest score of his BFTS career. And then this ride became "the closest any rider had ever been to conquering Mick E Mouse" in his career. Harris rode the bull for 7.47 seconds, only about one-half second from the whistle. Cody Lambert, Livestock Director for the PBR, believed that it would have been one of the greatest rides in PBR history: "I think he would have been 96 on him then". Commentator and two-time PBR world champion Justin McBride said that he thought Harris would ride Mick E. Mouse and that he still believed he will. Harris would face the bull two more times.

On August 30, Harris won his first PRCA Xtreme Bulls Championship. Sage Kimzey and Cody Campbell split the average at the Xtreme Bulls Tour Finale at the Ellensburg Rodeo Arena, but could not defeat Harris as the World Standings leader despite him missing the event due to injury.

On September 12, in Springfield, Missouri, at the PBR BFTS PFIWestern.com Invitational presented by Bass Pro Shops, Harris matched up with the 2015 PBR World Champion Bull Long John in Round 1. Harris scored a ride on Long John, but after hitting the ground, he was stepped on by the bull and knocked unconscious. Harris suffered a concussion as a result. In 2018, Harris talked about the incident, describing the event. He says that he was unable to dismount because of their proximity to the bucking chutes. Instead, when Long John threw him down, Harris' shoulder "caught on the chute" and he was trampled. Harris said that Long John "nearly shoved one of my lower vertebrae out of my spine", resulting in chronic back pain.

In mid-October, Harris qualified for his first PBR World Finals, earning a qualifier jacket and a ring. He finished the season as one of the top 35 riders to accomplish this. Harris competed his first season on the BFTS after he earned a place following three event exemptions. He completed the season ranked 31st in the World Standings. He made qualified rides on 12 of 31 bulls for a 38.71 riding percentage. He ended with two top 5 finishes and four top 10 finishes. According to the ProBullStats Bull Riding Compendium, Harris had 102 outs (riding out of the chute on a bull) in 74 events this season. Harris has said this his worst year in terms of injuries and how he felt, but next season he would focus on the PBR.

In mid-October, at the Thomas & Mack Center in Las Vegas, Nevada, Harris competed in the PBR BFTS World Finals. It was his first finals qualification. On October 22, Harris won the first round in the PBR Finals with a qualified ride on Owens/Lane's bull Jo Jo for 88.75 points. He had some trouble getting started, but he came from behind to win the PBR 2014 Rookie of the Year award. The PBR Rookie of the Year award is presented to the bull rider who earns the most points in the World Standings on their season on the BFTS. In 2013, the PBR switched to a points-based system rather a monetary system.

Harris turned in what the PBR considered his best performance so far. He went 4-for-6 to finish third in the event average. First, he made a qualified ride of 90.5 points on the bull Pound the Alarm in Round 5. Then, he made a qualified ride on the bull Honey Hush for a BFTS career-high 93.25 points in the championship round. He earned 3,736 points towards the World Standings. Harris competed in 14 events on the BFTS that year. He finished the year 9th in the standings, due to a 43.24 percent riding average. Harris planned to focus on the BFTS in 2015, but also planned to attend as many rodeos as he can. He still wanted to break Don Gay's record of eight championships.

Heading into the 2014 NFR, the defending champion was ranked 6th in the PRCA World Standings. He trailed the leader, Sage Kimzey, by $65,858. He was seeking his fifth title. On Saturday, December 13, Kimzey, the 20-year-old rookie from Strong City, Oklahoma, won the PRCA bull riding world championship with $318,631 and the NFR Average title with 671 points on eight head. He won four rounds which tied a record held by Harris and a few other cowboys. Harris turned in an average performance this year. His earnings of $109,182 put him in 9th place, and his average total was 310.5, $11,953 putting him in 6th place.

=== 2015 season ===
On February 15, Harris competed in the PBR Caterpillar Classic held at the Sprint Center in Kansas City, Missouri. It was his first event win on the BFTS. Harris made a qualified ride on all three rounds with a winning total of 261.5 points, and was the only rider to do so, thus he could have collected his championship belt buckle before the championship round. But Harris wanted that round, which contained the 15 toughest bulls. "I was riding more for personal satisfaction and more out there to prove a point than anything". Harris said. "I can still ride the short-round bulls". Harris rode Gotta Go Joe for 86.50 points, Closing Time for 86.50 points, and Crystal Can Do for 88.50 points. He rode Crystal Can Do in the championship round. His performance that weekend earned him 400 event points for coming in first in the event. He also earned a total of 525 event points towards the World Standings. Harris expressed that he felt good to ride the championship bull and "get back to why I started bull riding in the first place, to just have fun".

In February in Anaheim, California, Harris faced Mick E Mouse, for a second time. The bull bucked him off in 2.65 seconds and scored a career best of 47 points.

On March 22, in Albuquerque, New Mexico, at the Ty Murray Invitational, in WisePies Arena, on a Sunday afternoon, Harris met up with the three-time World Champion Bull Contender Mick E. Mouse for the third time. His owner, Marlene Henry, was watching anxiously 10 yards (9.1 m) away from where Harris was preparing in the chute. The bull threw Harris to the ground in 2.97 seconds. Henry was anxious about the matchup; she hoped Harris didn't ride her bull as they were trying to break Bushwacker's buckoff streak record of 42 straight buckoffs. But at the same time, she had respect for him. Mick E.'s handler Ken Loudamy added, "I loved that he picked him and I love that he has that tenacity in him to try and ride him. I think he can ride him". Harris felt if he could work out his issues with the location of his free arm, he could ride him. But, due to medical issues, Mick E. Mouse was euthanized in early August 2015, unridden.

On the last weekend of March, at the KeyArena, in Seattle, Washington, Harris faced World Champion Bull Contender Smooth Operator. Smooth Operator and Harris first met in the 15/15 Bucking Battle on Friday night where Smooth Operator bucked Harris off in 3.33 seconds and scored a high 46 point bull score. Then on Saturday, they met up again when Harris drew the bull in the BFTS championship round and Smooth Operator again bucked Harris off, this time in 2.44 seconds, and earned a career-high bull score of 46.5 points. The bull's owner, Chad Berger, describes the bull's bucking style as a "corkscrew" motion which he used Friday night to yank the bull rope out of Harris' hand and throw him. "J.W. Harris went at him both days with everything he had", Berger said. "It wasn't like he went through the motions. J.W. rides into his hand really good and J.W. threw his hips at him and tried his heart out".

On September 13, in Springfield, Missouri, at the PFI invitational, Harris made a qualified ride for 90.25 point ride on World Champion Bull Contender Sweet Pro's Long John in the championship round. It filled out his 3-for-4 event winning performance for the weekend and helped him win the event. He also rode Cowboy Soul for 83 points and Legacy for 87.50 points. He was bucked off Pile Driver 4.65 seconds. This win in Springfield put him in 6th place in the World Standings. Harris spent this season challenging the rankest bulls, such as Smooth Operator, Little Red Jacket, and Mick E. Mouse, but not quite getting a qualified ride on any of them. Harris used his 8th selection to pick Long John while knowing he needed a high score to win the event. But more broadly, Harris was hoping to conquer Long John as the start of a streak that could get him to the world champion bull rider title. Commentator and seven-time PRCA world champion Ty Murray believed Harris could do it. "I think so. He knows what it takes and he knows what it takes to ride rank bulls". Murray said. "I think there definitely has been an adjustment for him coming up to this league. He is in a good position right now when you are looking at how beat up J.B. is and how bad João is riding".

=== 2016 season ===
In early February Harris announced that he had decided to undergo surgery on his right elbow, and would miss four to six months of competition to do so. The injury caused him to miss the last two BFTS events as it was his riding arm, and had been affecting him for two years. He decided to do it then since he figured his best chance to win the PBR World Champion title would be to have it repaired. Additionally, he risked further damage to the injury by not getting it corrected immediately. Once the surgery was over, it was a matter of time and healing as to whether he could make the finals. Harris was 20th in the World Standings with 250 points. He earned those points at the New York City event by winning the 15/15 Bucking Battle and Round 1. It was possible for Harris to stay in contention even with time off. For example, if he was out for the full six months, there would still have been eight BFTS events to compete in to try for finals.

Roughly six months after the surgery, he and his whole family were involved in a car accident and sustained non-life-threatening injuries. According to a local newspaper, Harris and his family were traveling in a Ford dually pickup when an elderly couple in a Ford F-250 crossed into the oncoming lane, causing a head-on collision. The accident occurred in Brown County, Texas, and killed the elderly couple. There was suspicion of another vehicle that forced the elderly couple into the lane.

Harris was out for approximately six months and experienced pain in his right leg and his back after the accident. The family made the trip to Dallas, Texas, to see Dr. Tandy Freeman, who diagnosed Harris with a torn right PCL. The injury required another surgery which would keep Harris out of action for another six months. Harris had been close to returning to the BFTS after his previous hip and elbow surgery, and was eyeing the Thackerville, Oklahoma, event, set for September 3. The accident completely ended his aspirations for a world title in any rodeo circuit in this season. Harris was 3-for-7 in three events this season. Harris began the 2017 season with five BFTS injury exemptions.

=== 2017 season ===
On a Friday, in mid-February, at the BFTS event in Anaheim, California, Harris broke a long buckoff streak by making a qualified ride on the bull Thunderstruck in Round 1. He bucked off the bull Crazy Days in 6.99 seconds in the second round, but his score from Friday was good enough to take him into the championship round. His championship round bull was Asteroid, and Harris only lasted 2.7 seconds on the bull. Instead, Shane Proctor took the event win.

In mid-March Harris earned 110 points between the PBR Velocity Tour and the Touring Pro Division to get to No. 35 in the World Standings. Harris blamed himself for getting cut from the BFTS. He won the Touring Pro Division event with 88.5 points on the bull Big Sexy. A week prior, Harris came in fourth at the Hampton, Virginia, Velocity Tour event. The two events brought him the 110 points and a return to the BFTS which started with the Ty Murray Invitational. He finished in the 34th slot in the Ty Murray Invitational, an event which Stormy Wing won.

On Sunday, March 26, at the PBR BFTS Ak-Chin Invitational in Glendale, Arizona, Harris met up with the rankest (most difficult to ride) bull in the PBR, Air Time, who was only ridden once. They met in the championship round, and Air Time bucked him off in 2.13 seconds to earn a high bull score of 45.25 points. The buck off time was average for Air Time.

On Friday, November 3, at the PBR BFTS World Finals, Harris sustained a strain to his right pectoral muscle. He was ruled as probable to continue. On Saturday, he announced he would get the injury repaired after the Finals were over. "Why not come?" Harris said. "It is the biggest stage in bull riding. I don't know why you wouldn't. I don’t care if you have a broken leg. If you can get on, you come here." Harris rode Beaver Creek Beau for a qualified ride; it was his only one this Finals. Harris was the 8th rider to make a qualified ride off the 2,000 bull in 63 outs. He finished the season ranked 32nd in the World Standings. He had spent the better part of the season riding with a "groin strain and torn abdominal muscle", so his ranking was actually better than it should have been.

=== 2018–19 seasons ===
On Sunday, January 7, Harris announced that he was leaving the PBR and returning to the PRCA, which meant he was returning to rodeo full-time to focus on winning a fifth gold buckle. Harris spent nine years in the PRCA before dedicating his focus solely on the PBR for three years. "I got to where I just didn't like coming to [the rank bulls] anymore," Harris said. "It really is not my thing, I guess you could say. All of the lights, cameras and drama. I was trying to be something that I wasn't. I was trying to be a PBR bull rider instead of a rodeo cowboy. There is just not a whole lot of common ground with the other guys in there. There is a few. Outside of a few, it is not there." He also pointed out his comeback to win the 2014 Rookie of the Year award, as well as his career-high 93.25 points, ride on Honey Hush, which is his favorite. Those things stand out when held up against people who said he didn't belong in the PBR.

In late April, Harris once again won the George Paul Memorial Bull Riding in Del Rio, Texas. Only now, the event was sanctioned by the PRCA as part of its Xtreme Bulls Division 1 tour.

At the 2018 NFR, Harris joined veteran commentators Jeff Medders and Butch Knowles in the booth during the airing of the event on CBS Sports Network to provide color commentary during the bull riding segments.

In late February 2019, Harris rode PBR and PRCA world champion bull Bruiser in the championship round to win the San Antonio Stock Show & Rodeo in San Antonio, Texas.

== Retirement ==
In February 2020, Harris announced he was retiring from bull riding. He cited family and injuries as his main inducements for retiring. "It hurts too much to do it anymore," he said.

Even though he said 2020 would be his final year of competition, Harris kept on riding through the spring of 2021, with the PRCA Xtreme Bulls event at the Rio Grande Valley Livestock Show and Rodeo in Mercedes, Texas, on May 12 officially being his last one.

== Career summary ==
Harris qualified for the NFR nine times consecutively from 2006 through 2014. He won four bull riding world championships while competing in the PRCA, from 2008 to 2010, and again in 2013. He also won two NFR Average titles in bull riding in 2008 and 2010. He qualified for the National Circuit Finals Rodeo (NCFR) three times in 2006, 2009, and 2010. He won the NCFR Average title in bull riding twice in 2009 and 2010. His PRCA career earning stars totaled over $2 million.

Harris started on the CBR tour in 2005. For the next nine years, he finished among the top ten. The year 2009 was his best finish, which was 4th place. Along the way, he racked up numerous Horizon Series wins, multiple second and third-place finishes and six event wins on CBR's elite series (known as the Cinch CBR Tour from 2010 to 2012 and the Road to Cheyenne Tour from 2013 to 2018).

Harris concluded his four-year career in the PBR 58-for-166 (34.52 percent riding average). He has three PBR BFTS World Finals Qualifications (2014–2015, 2017). His last out for the PBR was in November 2017 at the World Finals. He also has three 90-point rides and three event wins.

== Honors ==
In 2022, Harris was inducted into the Texas Rodeo Cowboy Hall of Fame. That same year, he was inducted into the Bull Riding Hall of Fame.

== Personal life ==
Harris is 5 feet 10 inches (178 cm) tall and weighs 160 pounds (73 kg).

He resides in Brownwood, Texas, with his 2nd wife, Megan Harris (née Penney). In 2024, Harris and his wife bought a house next to the water at Lake Brownwood. They raise and breed horses, specifically American Quarter Horses for barrel racing.
