= George Paul Memorial Bull Riding =

Annual bull riding event

The George Paul Memorial Bull Riding is an annual bull riding event held every spring at the Val Verde County Fairgrounds in Del Rio, Texas, United States. It is held in honor of George Paul, the 1968 Rodeo Cowboys Association (RCA) World Champion bull rider.

== About ==
George Paul was born on March 5, 1947, in San Antonio, Texas, to Robert Paul and Georgia Miers and grew up on the San Miguel Ranch in Ciudad Acuña, Coahuila, Mexico; right across the border from Del Rio, Texas. He had two brothers, Bobby and Lee, and a sister, Betty. He was inspired by Stoney Burke, a fictitious television rodeo champion based on real-life 9-time RCA world champion Casey Tibbs to become a world champion rodeo cowboy himself.

Paul joined the American Junior Rodeo Association (AJRA) in 1961 at the age of 14. In 1965, he won the AJRA bull riding world championship, and the following year in 1966, he won the AJRA bareback bronc riding and all-around world championships. He later attended a rodeo school held by 16-time RCA world champion Jim Shoulders. Paul counted that experience as one of the most beneficial of his career. The same year he won his bareback and all-around world championships in the AJRA, he turned professional and joined the RCA. In 1967, he entered and traveled to multiple RCA rodeos by ground either in a car or pick-up truck, but most of the time, he flew. Being a licensed pilot, he would fly his own plane, a twin engine Bonanza, for the opportunity to enter more rodeos and win more money to qualify for the RCA's championship event, the National Finals Rodeo (NFR) in Oklahoma City, Oklahoma, in December, where the year's RCA world champions in each rodeo event were determined. Only the top 15 money winners in each event were qualified to compete. Paul succeeded in qualifying for his first NFR in bull riding that year. He successfully rodeo seven of his nine bulls and finished 4th in the final RCA bull riding world standings that year. He also finished 13th in the all-around category.

1968 would prove to be a milestone year for Paul. He traveled 125,000 miles to 150 RCA rodeos in the United States and Canada. He would compete in both bareback bronc riding and bull riding, but if he could only compete in one event at a rodeo because of scheduling, he entered just in bull riding. By the middle of the middle season, Paul was successfully riding all of his bulls to the eight-second whistle, no matter how hard they bucked. When the regular season ended, he had successfully ridden 79 bulls in a row; a record that still stands in bull riding to this day. He qualified for his second NFR in bull riding with a commanding lead in the world standings. It was his first bull at the NFR that bucked him off and ended his successful ride streak. However, he would successfully ride his remaining eight bulls and win both the NFR bull riding average title and the RCA bull riding world championship.

In 1969, Paul decided to stay close to home to help with his family's one million acre ranch in Mexico, but in 1970, he decided to try to qualify for the NFR again.

On July 30, 1970, Paul was tragically killed when he was flying his plane between rodeos and it crashed in Commissary Ridge in Kemmerer, Wyoming. The wreckage was discovered two days later by a rancher. Paul was 23 years old. He never married and had no children. He was interred in Westlawn Cemetery in Del Rio.

The Rodeo Cowboys Association (RCA) was renamed the Professional Rodeo Cowboys Association (PRCA) in 1975.

Since 1978, Paul's family, led by his brother Bobby, has hosted the George Paul Memorial Bull Riding in his hometown of Del Rio. It is the oldest continuous stand-alone bull riding event in the United States. Many of the world's best bull riders have competed at the event and is considered to be one of the most prestigious events to win in bull riding. For many years, the event was also popularly known as the Superbull.

Paul has been posthumously inducted into several halls of fame. In 1979, he was inducted as a member of the inaugural class of the ProRodeo Hall of Fame. In 2005, he was inducted into the Texas Rodeo Cowboy Hall of Fame. In 2007, he was inducted into the Rodeo Hall of Fame of the National Cowboy & Western Heritage Museum. In 2012, he was inducted into the Texas Cowboy Hall of Fame. In 2015, he was inducted as a member of the inaugural class of the Bull Riding Hall of Fame and the George Paul Memorial Bull Riding event was also inducted in the "Legends" category. In 2026, he was inducted into the PBR Ring of Honor.

From 1978 to 1992, the George Paul Memorial was an independent, unsanctioned event, but in 1993, it was one of the first events to be sanctioned by the Professional Bull Riders (PBR). From 1993 to 1997, it was a PBR-sanctioned event, but in 1998, it became sanctioned by Bull Riders Only (BRO). However, said organization would go out of business shortly after the George Paul Memorial was held that year. In 1999, the event went back to being sanctioned by the PBR. The partnership between the George Paul Memorial and PBR lasted through 2007. In 2008, the event became sanctioned by Championship Bull Riding (CBR) and this lasted through 2017. CBR went out of business the following year. Since 2018, the George Paul Memorial has been sanctioned by the Professional Rodeo Cowboys Association (PRCA) as an Xtreme Bulls event. The event did not take place in 2020 because of the COVID-19 pandemic, but returned in 2021.

== List of George Paul Memorial Bull Riding champions ==
Year	Sanctioning Body	Champion
1978	Unsanctioned	(United States) Denny Flynn
1979	Unsanctioned	(Canada) Don Johansen
1980	Unsanctioned	(United States) Denny Flynn
1981	Unsanctioned	(United States) Charlie Sampson
1982	Unsanctioned	(United States) Charlie Sampson
1983	Unsanctioned	(United States) Lane Foltyn (tie) (United States) Lonnie Wyatt (tie)
1984	Unsanctioned	(Canada) Cody Snyder
1985	Unsanctioned	(United States) Lane Frost
1986	Unsanctioned	(United States) Lane Frost (tie) (United States) Tuff Hedeman (tie)
1987	Unsanctioned	(United States) Charlie Sampson
1988	Unsanctioned	(United States) Bubba Monkres
1989	Unsanctioned	(United States) Cody Lambert
1990	Unsanctioned	(United States) Jim Sharp
1991	Unsanctioned	(United States) Toya Bolton
1992	Unsanctioned	(United States) Tuff Hedeman
1993	Professional Bull Riders	(United States) Jerome Davis
1994	Professional Bull Riders (Bud Light PBR Tour)	(United States) Royd Doyal
1995	Professional Bull Riders (Bud Light PBR Tour)	(United States) Tuff Hedeman
1996	Professional Bull Riders (Bud Light PBR Tour)	(United States) Jerome Davis
1997	Professional Bull Riders (Touring Pro Division)	(United States) Bubba Dunn
1998	Bull Riders Only (Wrangler Pro Tour)	(United States) John Ash
1999	Professional Bull Riders (Touring Pro Division)	(United States) Donald Owens
2000	Professional Bull Riders (Touring Pro Division)	(United States) Ross Coleman
2001	Professional Bull Riders (Challenger Tour)	(United States) Jim Sharp
2002	Professional Bull Riders (Challenger Tour)	(United States) J.W. Hart
2003	Professional Bull Riders (Challenger Tour)	(United States) Sean Willingham
2004	Professional Bull Riders (Challenger Tour)	(United States) Zack Brown
2005	Professional Bull Riders (Challenger Tour)	(United States) Mike Scarlavai (tie) (United States) B.J. Schumacher (tie)
2006	Professional Bull Riders (Challenger Tour)	(United States) Robey Condra
2007	Professional Bull Riders (Challenger Tour)	(United States) L.J. Jenkins
2008	Championship Bull Riding	(United States) Cooper Kanngiesser
2009	Championship Bull Riding	(Mexico) Hugo Pedrero
2010	Championship Bull Riding (Cinch CBR Tour)	(United States) Clint Craig
2011	Championship Bull Riding (Cinch CBR Tour)	(United States) J.W. Harris
2012	Championship Bull Riding (Cinch CBR Tour)	(United States) Cole Echols
2013	Championship Bull Riding (The Road to Cheyenne Tour)	(United States) Trey Benton
2014	Championship Bull Riding (The Road to Cheyenne Tour)	(United States) Trey Benton
2015	Championship Bull Riding (The Road to Cheyenne Tour	(United States) Cody Teel
2016	Championship Bull Riding (The Road to Cheyenne Tour)	(United States) Brennon Eldred
2017	Championship Bull Riding (The Road to Cheyenne Tour)	(United States) Trey Benton
2018	Professional Rodeo Cowboys Association (Xtreme Bulls Division I)	(United States) J.W. Harris
2019	Professional Rodeo Cowboys Association (Xtreme Bulls Division I)	(United States) Trevor Reiste
2021	Professional Rodeo Cowboys Association (Xtreme Bulls Division I)	(United States) T.J. Gray
2022	Professional Rodeo Cowboys Association (Xtreme Bulls Division I)	(United States) Brady Portenier
2023	Professional Rodeo Cowboys Association (Xtreme Bulls Division I)	(United States) Sage Kimzey
2024	Professional Rodeo Cowboys Association (Xtreme Bulls Division I)	(United States) Josh Frost
2025	Professional Rodeo Cowboys Association (Xtreme Bulls Division I)	(United States) Tristen Hutchings
2026	Professional Rodeo Cowboys Association (Xtreme Bulls Division I)	(United States) Tristen Hutchings
