= Sage Kimzey =

American bull rider

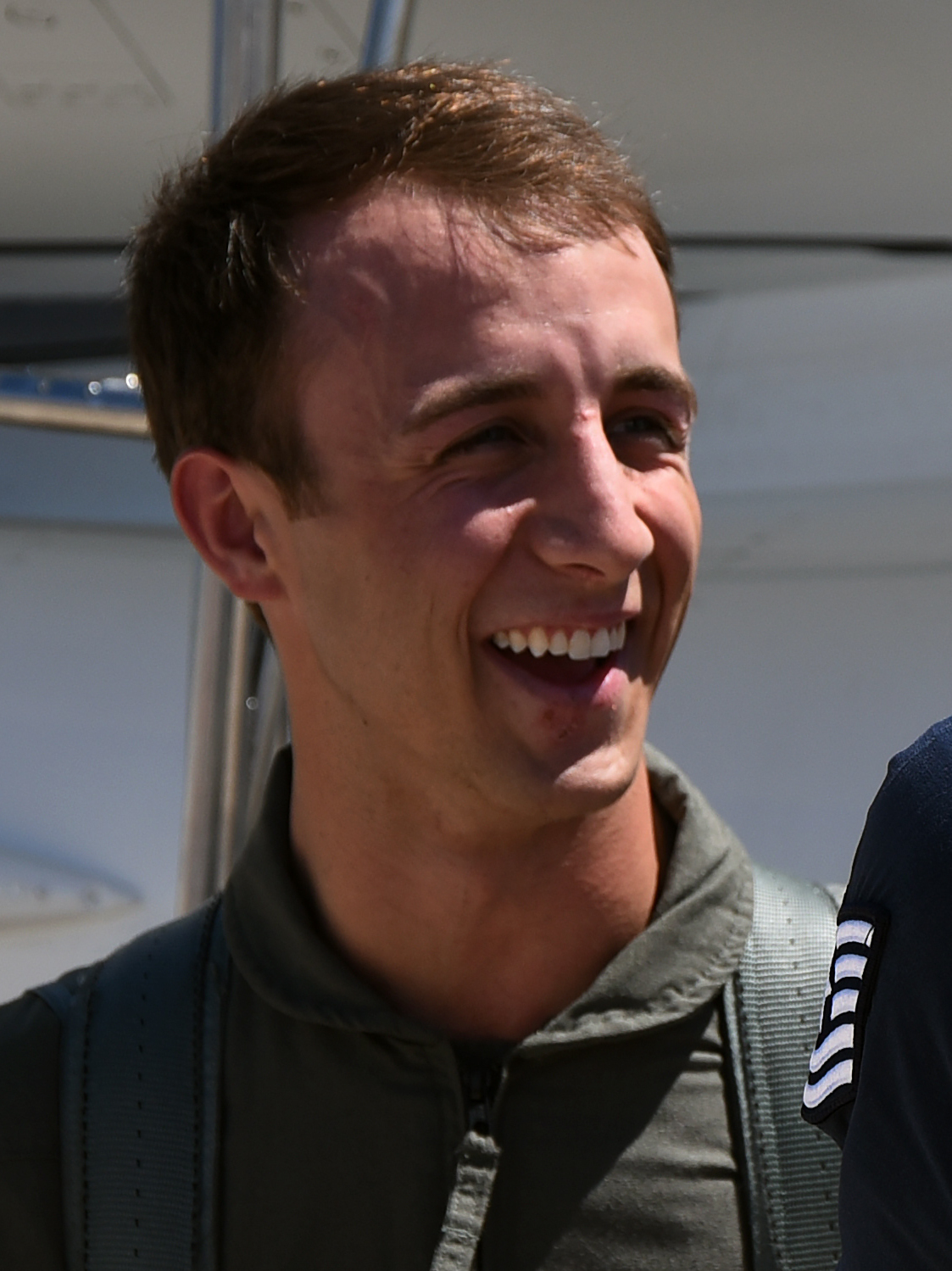
- Kimzey in 2016

Personal information
- Full name: Sage Steele Kimzey
- Born: August 26, 1994 (age 32) Strong City, Oklahoma, U.S.
- Height: 5 ft 8 in (1.73 m) (2019)
- Weight: 150 lb (68 kg) (2019)

Sport
- Sport: Rodeo
- Event: Bull riding
- Turned pro: 2013

Achievements and titles
- Highest world ranking: 7× PRCA Bull Riding World Champion; 3× CBR World Champion; 2014 PRCA Bull Riding Rookie of the Year; 2024 PBR World Finals Event Champion

Sage Steele Kimzey (born August 26, 1994) is an American professional rodeo cowboy who specializes in bull riding. For most of his career, he competed in the Professional Rodeo Cowboys Association (PRCA), winning seven bull riding world championships. He also competed in the now-defunct Championship Bull Riding (CBR) organization, where he won three world championships. In 2023, he began riding for the Carolina Cowboys in the Professional Bull Riders (PBR) Team Series. Since 2024, he competes full-time in the PBR. Since 2025, he rides for the Austin Gamblers.

== Early life ==
Sage Steele Kimzey was born on August 26, 1994, in Strong City, Oklahoma. His father, Ted, was a PRCA barrelman who also worked at the National Finals Rodeo (NFR) in 1980 and 1987. His mother, Jennifer, is the CEO of Gold Buckle Realty. His older sister, Dusta, is a pharmacist, and his younger brother Trey followed in his footsteps by becoming a bull rider as well. His mother and siblings sideline as trick riders. Kimzey graduated from Cheyenne High School in Oklahoma. He played basketball there for four years. His team won the state championship in his senior year. He attended Southwestern Oklahoma State University (Weatherford).

== Career highlights ==
=== 2013 season ===
Kimzey began his PRCA career this year. He won the Rangers Rodeo in Lawton, Oklahoma, with a 93-point ride on D&H Cattle's No. 43x; the Chisholm Trail Stampede in Duncan, Oklahoma; and the Crosstie PRCA Rodeo in Hinton, Oklahoma. He won the Land Rush Pro Rodeo in Beggs, Oklahoma; the Kit Carson County Fair & Rodeo in Burlington, Colorado; and the Area Chamber of Commerce Fourth of July Rodeo in Belton, Texas. He won the Mesquite ProRodeo Series in Mesquite, Texas, on June 21 and July 5; and the MH Henry Pro Rodeo in Bowie, Texas, on Sept. 14 and Sept. 15. He was co-champion at the Topeka PRCA Rodeo in Topeka, Kansas; and the Jayhawker Roundup Rodeo in Hill City, Kansas. He set a PRCA record for most money won on a permit in a single season with $47,726.

=== 2014 season ===
In the PRCA regular season, Kimzey won the San Antonio Stock Show & Rodeo in San Antonio, Texas; the San Antonio Xtreme Bulls, also in San Antonio, Texas; and the All-American ProRodeo Finals in Waco, Texas. He won the New Mexico State Fair & Rodeo in Albuquerque, New Mexico; the Central Wyoming Fair & PRCA Rodeo in Casper, Wyoming; and the Elks Rodeo in Woodward, Oklahoma. He won the Tulsa State Fair PRCA Rodeo in Tulsa, Oklahoma; the Chisholm Trail Stampede in Duncan, Oklahoma; and the Will Rogers Stampede in Claremore, Oklahoma. He won the Spokane Interstate Rodeo in Spokane, Washington; the Southwestern International PRCA Rodeo in El Paso, Texas; and the Kitsap Stampede Division 2 Xtreme Bulls in Bremerton, Washington. He won the Division 2 Qualifying Xtreme Bulls Event in Oklahoma City, Oklahoma; and the Gem State Classic ProRodeo Series in Blackfoot, Idaho. He was co-champion at the Xtreme Bulls Tour Finale in Ellensburg, Washington; the Guymon Pioneer Days Rodeo in Guymon, Oklahoma; the Rapid City Rodeo Wrangler Champions Challenge in Rapid City, South Dakota; and the Nacogdoches Pro Rodeo & Steer Show in Nacogdoches, Texas.

In the Championship Bull Riding (CBR) circuit, he won the Casa Ford Tuff Hedeman West Texas Shootout Presented by Sunland Park Racetrack & Casino in El Paso, Texas; and won his first CBR world championship at the CBR World Finals at Cheyenne Frontier Days in Cheyenne, Wyoming.

At the NFR, he won four rounds, won the average title, and became the second rookie to win a bull riding gold buckle. His total NFR earnings of $175,466 was the highest of the event, giving him the Ram Truck Top Gun Award. He finished with a rookie record total of $318,631. The record could be any event or a combined amount. By winning this championship during his first two years, he became the first competitor to do so as a card carrying holder in the PRCA.

=== 2015 season ===
In the PRCA regular season, Kimzey won the Ellensburg Rodeo in Ellensburg, Washington; the Xtreme Bulls Tour Finale, also in Ellensburg, Washington; the Pendleton Round-Up in Pendleton, Oregon; and the Wrangler Champions Challenge Finale in Omaha, Nebraska. He won the Wrangler Champions Challenges in Logandale, Nevada and Redding, California; and the Spanish Fork Fiesta Days Rodeo in Spanish Fork, Utah. He won the Rangers Rodeo in Lawton, Oklahoma; the Gooding Pro Rodeo in Gooding, Idaho; the Range Days Rodeo in Rapid City, South Dakota; and the Cassia County Fair & Rodeo in Burley, Idaho. He won the Pasadena Livestock Show & Rodeo in Pasadena, Texas; and the Division 2 Qualifying Xtreme Bulls Event in Oklahoma City, Oklahoma. He was co-champion at the Guymon Pioneer Days Rodeo in Guymon, Oklahoma; and the Cattleman Days Rodeo in Ashland, Missouri. He was also the PRCA Xtreme Bulls Tour champion.

He won RodeoHouston in Houston, Texas. He also won the Calgary Stampede in Calgary, Alberta.

In the CBR circuit, he won the Kansas Star Chute Out in Mulvane, Kansas; and the Red Wilk Construction CBR Bull Bash in Huron, South Dakota. He finished second in the CBR world standings.

He placed in seven rounds at the NFR. He finished second in the average. He won his second world championship in a row with $327,178. Kimzey came into the NFR with a very large lead, having had a very successful regular season. At the finals, he drew some tough bulls. His rides were not as successful as he wanted. However, his successful regular season covered that. He rode six bulls. Still, the bulls he did and did not ride cost him money. The championship came down to the finish. He managed to ride well enough to win.

=== 2016 season ===
In the PRCA regular season, Kimzey won the San Antonio Stock Show & Rodeo in San Antonio, Texas; the Pendleton Round-Up in Pendleton, Oregon; and the Sikeston Jaycee Bootheel Rodeo in Sikeston, Missouri. He won the Ogden Pioneer Days in Ogden, Utah; the Molalla Buckeroo Rodeo in Molalla, Oregon; and Kansas' Biggest Rodeo in Phillipsburg, Kansas. He won the Wrangler Champions Challenges in Spanish Fork, Utah and Pueblo, Colorado; the Cody Stampede Rodeo in Cody, Wyoming; and the Cody Stampede Wrangler Champions Challenge. He won the 40th Annual Isanti, Minnesota Firefighters Rodeo; and Iowa's Championship Rodeo in Sidney, Iowa. He was co-champion at the Horse Heaven Round-up Wranglers Champions Challenge in Kennewick, Washington; and the Wild Bill Hickok Rodeo in Abilene, Kansas.

He won RodeoHouston in Houston, Texas, for the second year in a row.

In the CBR circuit, he won the Eldorado Resort Casino Shreveport Tuff Hedeman Championship Bull Riding in Bossier City, Louisiana; and the CBR World Finals in Cheyenne, Wyoming. He also won his second CBR world championship.

At the NFR, he won Round 1. He placed in five rounds to rank third. He won his third consecutive world championship with $311,462 in earnings.

He rode Aftershock from Frontier Rodeo in the first round and scored 86.50 points. He was second in Round 3 once he rode Night Moves from the Calgary Stampede with a score of 87.50. He covered his bull in the fifth round, but did not win any money. He split second and third in Round 6 with a score of 87.50 on Half Nuts, from Pete Carr Rodeo. In Round 7, he split a score of 79, for fifth place, with a bull named Long Haired Outlaw. Outlaw was a bull from New West Rodeo. In the tenth and final round, he rode the Lancaster & Jones bull Total Bulls Battle Born earning an 83-point score which clinched the world championship. Kimzey had now entered the record books winning three world titles in a row in his first three years as a card holder. Another thing Kimzey had managed was too stay relatively injury-free except for minor injuries.

=== 2017 season ===
In the PRCA regular season, Kimzey won the Days of '47 Cowboy Games and Rodeo in Salt Lake City, Utah; the K-Days Rodeo in Edmonton, Alberta; the Ellensburg Rodeo in Ellensburg, Washington; and the Walker County Fair & Rodeo in Huntsville, Texas. He won the SWELS-Xtreme Bulls in Fort Worth, Texas; the Crystal Springs Rodeo Xtreme Bulls in Clear Lake, South Dakota; and the Lea County Fair & PRCA Rodeo Xtreme Bulls in Lovington, New Mexico. He won the Bell County PRCA Rodeo in Belton, Texas; Rodeo Killeen in Killeen, Texas; and the Mandan Rodeo Days Xtreme Bulls in Mandan, North Dakota. He won the Wild, Wild West ProRodeo in Silver City, New Mexico; the Red Desert Roundup in Rock Springs, Wyoming; the Wind River PRCA Rodeo Roundup in Riverton, Wyoming; and the Crossett Riding Club 68th Annual PRCA Rodeo in Crossett, Arkansas. He was co-champion at the Redding Rodeo in Redding, California. He also won the PRCA Xtreme Bulls Tour championship for the second time.

He won The American Rodeo in Arlington, Texas. He also won the Calgary Stampede in Calgary, Alberta.

In the CBR circuit, he won the Navajo Nation CBR in Window Rock, Arizona; the Championship Bull Riding Battle on the Great Plains in Enid, Oklahoma; and the Casa Ford Tuff Hedeman Championship Bull Riding Presented by Sunland Park Racetrack and Casino in El Paso, Texas. He also won his third and final CBR world championship.

As the reigning PRCA world champion bull rider, Kimzey was invited to compete at the 2017 Professional Bull Riders (PBR) Velocity Tour Finals on October 28–30 in Las Vegas, Nevada. He successfully rode all four of his bulls and won the event; solidifying himself a spot at the PBR World Finals as a wild-card qualifier on November 1–5, also in Las Vegas. He successfully rode three of his six bulls at the World Finals and finished 12th at the event. He ended up finishing 33rd in the 2017 PBR world standings.

At the NFR, he won Rounds 5 and 10. He split the win in Round 3. He placed in five rounds. He finished first in the average with 601.5 points on seven head. He finished the year ranked first in the world standings. His earnings for the NFR were $436,479.

For two years in a row, Kimzey did things no other bull rider had done. He won his fourth world title in his fourth attempt. He rode 4L and Diamond S Rodeo's Girl Money for an 88-point score to win Round 10 and win the gold buckle in front of 16,954 people. He was now halfway to tying Don Gay's record. He said he is halfway up the mountain and each step is special. Usually by now he had a healthy lead. However, this year he had some injuries, but got things going in the spring. Kimzey also won the NFR average title this year. He had 601.5 points on seven head. Kimzey became the only bull rider to break $400,00 in earnings in a single season. He won $192,134 at the finals to give him a total of $436,479, breaking his own record of $327,178 in 2015."I don't see any reason not to win nine or 10 in a row", Kimzey said. "I've got the talent and drive and ability, and the Lord has blessed me in ways I can't imagine."

=== 2018 season ===
In the PRCA regular season, Kimzey won the San Antonio Stock Show & Rodeo Xtreme Bulls in San Antonio, Texas; the Ellensburg Washington Rodeo Xtreme Bulls Tour Finale in Ellensburg, Washington; and Rodeo Austin in Austin, Texas. He won the National Circuit Finals Rodeo in Kissimmee, Florida; the All-American ProRodeo Finals in Waco, Texas; the Strathmore Stampede in Strathmore, Alberta; and the Livingston Roundup in Livingston, Montana. He won the Greeley Stampede in Greeley, Colorado; the Colorado State Fair & Rodeo in Pueblo, Colorado; and the Fort Mohave Classic PRCA Xtreme Bulls in Fort Mohave, Arizona. He won the Butterfield Stage Days PRCA Rodeo in Bridgeport, Texas; the Licking PRCA Rodeo in Licking, Missouri; the Wind River PRCA Rodeo Roundup in Riverton, Wyoming; and the Division 2 Qualifying Event Xtreme Bulls in Oklahoma City, Oklahoma. He won the Sanders County Fair & PRCA Rodeo in Plains, Montana; and the Comal County Fair & Rodeo in New Braunfels, Texas; and the River City Rodeo in Omaha, Nebraska. He also won co-champion at the Mountain Valley Stampede in Heber City, Utah; the Gladewater Round-Up Xtreme Bulls in Gladewater, Texas; and the Crockett Lions Club PRCA Rodeo in Crockett, Texas. He also won his second straight and third overall PRCA Xtreme Bulls Tour championship.

He again won the bull-riding event in Bossier City, Louisiana; only now it was sanctioned by the newly-formed Tuff Hedeman Bull Riding Tour.

Kimzey qualified for and competed at his fifth straight CBR World Finals in Cheyenne, Wyoming, and finished in 14th place in the final CBR world standings before the organization went out of business.

At the NFR, Kimzey won Round 10. He split the win in Round 3. He placed in four rounds. He came in fifth in the average. He finished with 347 points on four head. He finished at the top of the world standings five years in a row. His total NFR earnings were $415,263.

Kimzey came into the NFR with a huge lead this time. He had started out his season with a broken pelvis. He also suffered other injuries during the year. He only got 4 qualified rides during the 10 rounds. However, in the 10th round, he had the highest score event, a 93-point score on Record Rack's Shootin' Stars, owned by Beutler & Son Rodeo.

This championship round tied Kimzey with Jim Shoulders record of five consecutive world titles. The difference was that Shoulders won his titles before the NFR existed, so Kimzey holds the record for the NFR. He made $415,263 for the year.

=== 2019 season ===
Kimzey won the Reno Rodeo in Reno, Nevada; the Pendleton Round-Up in Pendleton, Oregon; the Wainwright Stampede in Wainwright, Alberta; the Wharton County Youth Fair & Exposition Xtreme Bulls in Wharton, Texas; and the Helotes Festival Association Rodeo, also in Wharton, Texas. He also won A Night at the Ranch Bull Riding in Innisfail, Alberta; the Rocky Pro Rodeo in Rocky Mountain House, Alberta; the Mandan Rodeo Days in Mandan, North Dakota; and Kansas' Biggest Rodeo in Phillipsburg, Kansas. He won the Kitsap Stampede Xtreme Bulls in Bremerton, Washington; and the Tri-State Rodeo Cinch Shoot-Out in Fort Madison, Iowa. He became co-champion at the Alberta Black Gold Pro Rodeo in Leduc, Alberta; the Lea Park Rodeo in Marwayne, Alberta; the XIT Rodeo & Reunion in Dalhart, Texas; and the Strathmore Stampede in Strathmore, Alberta. He also won his third straight and fourth overall PRCA Xtreme Bulls Tour championship.

In mid-July, Kimzey was facing the final round at the Calgary Stampede in Calgary, Alberta, with three other competitors. It was time for the draw. One of the bulls was Night Moves. In 2017, Kimzey had ridden this bull for 91 points at the final round of the Calgary Stampede. He had matched up with this bull three times total. Night moves had bucked him off in 2016 at the Calgary Stampede. Kimzey had ridden the bull another time at the 2016 NFR for 87.5 points. After the others drew their bulls, he was left with Night Moves to have the bull who had helped him earn two titles before. Kimzey rode the bull for a new high score, 92.5 points. His celebration afterwards was clear to all. Kimzey rode that day to a total winning of the event; he became the first bull rider to win the Calgary Stampede three times, having previously won it in 2015 and 2017.

At the NFR, he won Rounds 7 and 8. He placed in eight rounds. He won his sixth consecutive bull riding world championship, and his third average title. He won a record NFR earnings of $235,359 (includes ground money). He finished at the top of the world standings with another record, $480,797 (including ground money).

This NFR saw individuals making strides in almost every event. The least amount required to qualify for the NFR was $100,000 in winnings. As usual though, the top 15 got through the door. Round 1 belonged to Stetson Wright and Boudreaux Campbell. Round 2 found Kimzey a second place check while Campbell again finished in the top three. Round 4 showed up Wright and Campbell earning big checks again. In Round 5, Kimzey was back earning more money. In Round 6, Campbell was still around and Kimzey collected another paycheck. In Round 7, it was quite a match. Kimzey got a 90-point ride. He essentially won the world championship after that by collecting another big check. Campbell was still climbing up the standings. In Round 8, he put another stamp on the championship. Campbell remained determined and Wright was holding second in the all-around race and adding more money to his bull riding total. In Round 9, any shot for No. 1 was definitely gone, but the rest were still available. Others were doing their best to get a spot. During Round 10, the world championship was decided. Jordan Hansen decided to end the finals by winning Round 7. Kimzey finished off his Round 10 with a second-place finish. Kimzey was now only two world championships away from tying Don Gay. Wright's determination brought him the all-around world title.

Winning this world title NFR tied Kimzey with Jim Shoulders' record. They have both won six consecutive bull riding world championships. Shoulders won seven titles, but only won six in a row from 1954 to 1959. Kimzey needed to win one more title to tie Shoulders for number of titles won.

=== 2020 season ===
Kimzey won the Herriman City Xtreme Bulls in Herriman, Utah; and the Gooding Pro Rodeo in Gooding, Idaho. He was the co-champion at the Iron County Fair and PRCA Rodeo in Parowan, Utah; and the co-champion at The American Rodeo in Arlington, Texas.

As of September 30, Kimzey was sitting at No. 1 in the world standings with earnings of $92,334.12. He had earned over $2 million to date, had won six world championships in a row, and was barely $3,000 over the No. 2 Ky Hamilton. Kimzey credited his youth as part of his inspiration. "Just growing up in this kind of environment and getting to hang around world champions all the time, even when I was growing up as a little bitty kid... it really lit a fire under me and made me want to be a professional rodeo cowboy that much more." His younger brother Trey started competing in his first full season in 2019, and they could often be seen vying for the same No. 1 spot at rodeos around the country.

In the NFR, in Round 10, Sage Kimzey split the win. He placed in four other rounds. He finished sixth in the average. His earnings in the NFR were $92,764.

=== 2021 season ===
On July 9, Sage Kimzey and Parker McCown split the win at the Dinosaur Roundup Rodeo in Vernal, Utah. They both won with 90.5-point rides. Kimzey had competed there a few times before, but never made any headway there. He drew Audacious from Powder River Rodeo this time. This bull had been a money bull for the stock contractors for a few years. He was actually even better this year. Kimzey knew he had a good chance to change things on this bull. He had ridden this bull in the past to the pay window at the 2019 San Antonio Stock Show & Rodeo. Daylon Swearigen recently rode him to a 90-point ride.

On August 22, Kimzey won the Yellowstone River Round-Up in Billings, Montana. He was matched up against Sankey Pro Rodeo and Phenom Genetics' bull Lil Man as the next to last ride of the night. Only one possible re-ride was remaining. Kimzey conquered the bull with a score of 90 points. It became the only qualified ride of the evening. After three days, during MontanaFair's rodeo, he won the Yellowstone River Round-Up bull riding championship. Kimzey took in $25,500 in prize money. "It feels really good", Kimzey told the Billings Gazette and 406mtsports.com moments after the ride. "I had a really good bull to give me a chance to win."

Kimzey won the Cactus Jack Xtreme Bull Riding in Uvalde, Texas; the Ropin Dreams Xtreme Bulls in Pleasanton, Texas; the Durant, Oklahoma Pro Rodeo; the Pioneer Days rodeo in Ogden, Utah; Kansas' Biggest Rodeo in Phillipsburg, Kansas; the Hells A Roarin Xtreme Bulls & Broncs Riding in Gardiner, Montana; and the Yellowstone River Round-Up in Billings, Montana. He was co-champion of the Dinosaur Roundup Rodeo in Vernal, Utah; and co-champion at the Mustard Seeds Xtreme Bulls in Mitchell, South Dakota. He also won his fifth PRCA Xtreme Bulls Tour championship.

Preparing for his goal of winning his seventh world championship upon entering the NFR, Kimzey said, "Still have to kind of pinch myself" entering the National Finals Rodeo. He was one title away from tying Jim Shoulders and two titles away from tying Don Gay with eight titles. Kimzey was currently in the No. 1 spot. He competed at all rodeo events as a child. Bull riding was his favorite and most successful event. He had won over $2.5 million and six straight world titles between 2014 and 2019. "I still have to kind of pinch myself, honestly," Kimzey said when asked about that impenetrable run. "You know, my motivation has changed a lot. I don't know that I have anything to prove anymore," he said. He was also considering going over to the PBR. "There are some benefits that way. We'll have to wait and see."

Kimzey managed to make a comeback in this NFR after last year's miss of the championship. He came away with two best place finishes of second in the average and a final total of third, totaling 506 points. Despite this showing, he still took first place by more than $50,000, and Josh Frost had to settle for second place. Kimzey is now just one title away from tying Don Gay's record.

=== 2022 season ===
In February, Kimzey had a busy two weeks in Fort Worth, Texas. On the 7th, Kimzey won the title at the Fort Worth Stock Show & Rodeo with a 91.5-point ride on 4L and Diamond Rodeo's bull Space Unicorn. The win at Fort Worth put him inside the top five in the world standings. Then, there was the birth of his son. He was where he needed to be after missing a few rodeos due to the birth. Later that month, Kimzey won the San Antonio Stock Show & Rodeo in San Antonio, Texas, and in May, the Cactus Jack Xtreme Bull Riding in Uvalde, Texas.

On June 10, Kimzey was bucked off by Pete Carr Pro Rodeo's Severe Weather at the Parker County Sheriff Posse's Frontier Days and PRCA Rodeo in Weatherford, Texas. During the ride, his left shoulder (free arm) popped out. It was the same shoulder he dislocated while riding bulls in high school and that had been bothering him for over a decade. After getting examined, in addition to his dislocated left shoulder, Kimzey found out he had multiple tears in his labrum, a totally torn supraspinatus, a displaced bicep tendon, a broken collarbone, and some rotator cuff damage (all on his left side). He figured it was a culmination of his bull riding wrecks from high school. He also learned that his injuries required surgery that would force him to miss the rest of the 2022 season. Kimzey was third in the PRCA world standings at the time of his injuries.

While recovering from surgery, Kimzey was a color commentator during the inaugural season of the PBR's Team Series. Even though he had finished inside the top 15 money-winning bull riders after the PRCA regular season had concluded, he was unable to compete at the NFR due to his post-surgery recovery timetable not allowing it.

=== 2023 season ===
Kimzey was a color commentator during the first few events of the 2023 PBR Unleash the Beast Series season while still recovering from surgery.

He returned to competition during the Fort Worth Stock Show & Rodeo's Xtreme Bulls event on January 17–18 where he rode Big Rafter Rodeo's Trunk Money for 89.5 points in Round 1. Kimzey would end up finishing the event in fourth place. He later went on to win the San Angelo Stock Show and Rodeo's Xtreme Bulls in San Angelo, Texas; the George Paul Memorial Xtreme Bulls in Del Rio, Texas; the Hugo Pro Rodeo in Hugo, Oklahoma; and the Rodeo of the Ozarks in Springdale, Arkansas.

Sage Kimzey declared for the 2023 PBR Team Series draft, and at the second annual Team Series draft at the Cowboy Channel Studio in Fort Worth, Texas, he was selected to ride for the Carolina Cowboys. His younger brother Trey also declared for the draft and was selected to ride for the Carolina Cowboys as well. Sage became a protected roster member, while Trey a reserve roster member.

Sage rode at the first PBR Team Series event of the season on July 24–25 at Cheyenne Frontier Days in Cheyenne, Wyoming. The Carolina Cowboys ended up finishing second at the event. However, the injury bug would bite Kimzey for the second year in a row while he was having a very good regular season. He returned to Cheyenne Frontier Days for his semifinal ride on July 28 during the PRCA rodeo. He drew Dakota Rodeo's Devil's Revenge and the bull bucked him off before reaching eight seconds. Kimzey landed on his left (free arm) shoulder and broke his left clavicle. He underwent surgery on August 1, and needed to be sidelined for at least six weeks. Kimzey was fourth in the PRCA world standings at the time of this injury.

Kimzey returned to competition at the Carolina Cowboys' hometown event at Cowboy Days in Greensboro, North Carolina, on September 22–24, where they finished fifth at the event.

At the PBR Team Series Championship, which was held on October 22–24 at T-Mobile Arena in Las Vegas, Nevada, the Carolina Cowboys were eliminated after the first day of competition.

On the weekend of November 10–11, 2023, Kimzey made his PBR Premier Series regular-season debut at the first event of the 2024 Unleash the Beast (UTB) season in Tucson, Arizona, where he finished tied for second with João Ricardo Vieira.

On the weekend of December 2–3, 2023, at the second event of the 2024 UTB season in St. Louis, Missouri, Kimzey finished sixth.

Kimzey announced that following the 2023 NFR, he would now ride full-time in the PBR; reasoning that he wished to travel less to be able to spend more time with his family and ensure more time to rest and recover between each event.

At the NFR, Kimzey won Round 5 with 92 points on Stace Smith Pro Rodeos' Polar Express and tied for first in Round 6 with 86.5 points on Frontier Rodeo's County Jail. He placed in three other rounds and finished second in the average. He ended up finishing fourth in the 2023 PRCA bull riding world standings with $369,222.

=== 2024 season ===
In February 2024, Kimzey announced that he would miss the next three to four months of competition due to an elbow injury that required surgery.

It seemed imminent that Kimzey would miss the rest of the 2024 UTB season, including the PBR World Finals. However, he decided to make his return to competition the week of April 5–7, during the 19th event of the UTB regular season in Sioux Falls, South Dakota, where he finished seventh.

On the week of April 20–21, at the 22nd UTB regular season event in Tacoma, Washington, Kimzey finished second; highlighted by a 91.5 point ride on Utz BesTex Legend in the Championship Round.

Kimzey qualified for his second PBR World Finals. On the weekend of May 9–12, at the World Finals Elimination Rounds in Fort Worth, Texas, he rode his last bull and finished the event in 11th place. He was also one of the five best finishing riders of the Elimination Rounds not ranked inside the top 15 of the world championship race. As a result, Kimzey automatically moved on to the World Finals Championship Rounds in Arlington, Texas, on May 18–19. He eventually won the World Finals by covering three of the four bulls in the first, third, and fourth Championship Rounds of the event. It was his first PBR Premier Series event win. He became the eighth rookie in the history of the PBR to win the World Finals and the second to Cooper Davis to win in their rookie season without winning the Rookie of the Year title. Kimzey finished the 2024 UTB season ranked seventh in the world championship race. Also, Kimzey became the fourth bull rider to win both finals averages in the PRCA and the PBR after Ted Nuce, Ty Murray, and L.J. Jenkins, respectively.

In 2024, the Carolina Cowboys finished in second place during the PBR Team Series regular season. As a result, both them and regular-season champions, the Kansas City Outlaws, received a first-round bye and automatically qualified for the second day of the Team Series Championship. The 2024 Team Series Championship was the weekend of October 18–20. The Cowboys succeeded in making it to the final round against the Austin Gamblers. The Gamblers ended up defeating the Cowboys to win the 2024 PBR Team Series Championship title.

=== 2025 season ===
The week of November 15–16, 2024, during the first event of the 2025 UTB season in Tucson, Arizona, it was announced that beginning that year, Kimzey would now ride for the Austin Gamblers during the Team Series season.

The week of December 7–8, 2024, during the third event of the 2025 UTB season in St. Louis, Missouri, Kimzey won Round 1 with 89.75 points on Mike's Motive. However, he would buck off his next two bulls and finished ninth in the event.

The week of December 13–14, 2024, during the fourth event of the 2025 UTB season in Wichita, Kansas, Kimzey was bucked off in the first round. However, he bounced back by riding his next two bulls; highlighted by a Championship Round-winning ride of 91.75 points on Nobody. Kimzey finished second in the event.

The week of February 7–8, 2025, during the twelfth event of the UTB season in Salt Lake City, Utah, Kimzey finished second; highlighted by a Championship Round-winning ride of 91 points on Playmate.

The week of February 22–23, 2025, during the fourteenth event of the UTB season in Jacksonville, Florida, Kimzey finished sixth; highlighted by a 91-point ride on Red Demon in the Championship Round.

The week of March 1–2, 2025, during the fifteenth event of the UTB season in Milwaukee, Wisconsin, Kimzey scored 89 points on Skippy and tied for second place in Round 1 with Elizmar Jeremias. In Round 2, Kimzey rode I Hate You for 88 points and won Round 2. In the Championship Round, he rode Eyes On Me for 88.25 points and won the event. This was the first regular-season Premier Series win and second overall Premier Series win of Kimzey's PBR career.

The week of March 21–23, 2025, during the eighteenth event of the UTB season in Thousand Palms, California, Kimzey finished third.

The first day of competition during the week of March 28–30, 2025, at the nineteenth event of the UTB season in Albuquerque, New Mexico, the Austin Gamblers defeated the Texas Rattlers to win the PBR Monster Energy Team Challenge presented by Camping World.

Kimzey qualified for his third PBR World Finals in 2025. The week of May 8–11, during the Elimination Rounds in Fort Worth, Texas, he bucked off all four of his bulls. However, as a result of him being in the top 15 riders in points towards the world championship, he automatically qualified for the Championship Rounds in Arlington, Texas. The week of May 17–18, during the Championship rounds, Kimzey bucked off his first two bulls. However, he bounced back by riding his next two bulls; Preacher's Kid for 86.75 points in Round 3 and Mike's Motive for 88.75 in Round 4. Kimzey tied with Kaiden Loud for fourth/fifth place in the event. Kimzey also finished the UTB season ranked in fifth place for the 2025 PBR world championship race.

The Austin Gamblers finished second in the 2025 PBR Team Series regular season. As a result, they, as well as regular-season champions Florida Freedom and third-place Texas Rattlers received a first-round bye and automatically qualified for the second day of the Team Series Championship, which was held October 24-26. The Freedom and Gamblers were eliminated after the second day of the event.

=== 2026 season ===
The week of January 9-11, 2026, during the fourth event of the UTB season in New York City, New York, Kimzey won Round 1 with 90.6 points on Blue Duck. His ride was also a part of the series of rides in which the Austin Gamblers defeated the Texas Rattlers to win the Monster Energy Team Challenge. In Round 2, Kimzey rode Easy Labor for 81.1 points and placed 11th in the round. In Round 3, he rode Snuggles for 87.05 points and placed fourth in the round. In the Championship Round, he rode Lights Out for 92.05 points to win the round and overall event. This was Kimzey's third PBR Premier Series win.

The week of January 23-24, 2026, during the sixth UTB event of the season in Tampa, Florida, Kimzey rode Show Biz for 85.8 points in Round 1 and finished ninth in the round. In Round 2, he rode Sunrise for 88.1 points and finished fourth in the round. In the Championship Round, he bucked off reigning two-time PBR world champion bull Man Hater and finished third overall in the event.

The week of January 30-February 1, 2026, at the seventh event of UTB season in Sacramento, California, Kimzey rode Swirl Your Glass for 86.8 points in Round 1 and finished seventh in the round. His ride was part of the Austin Gamblers' victory against the Carolina Cowboys in the Monster Energy Team Challenge. In Round 2, Kimzey rode I'm Him for 75.05 points and finished 26th in the round. In Round 3, he rode Noslaw Extrasauce for 86.8 points and finished sixth in the round. In the Championship Round, he was bucked off El Patron and finished seventh in the event.

The week of February 13-14, 2026, during the ninth event of the UTB season in Pittsburgh, Pennsylvania, Kimzey rode Mike's Motive for 88.35 points and finished sixth in Round 1. His ride was part of the Austin Gamblers' victory against the Arizona Ridge Riders in the Monster Energy Team Challenge. In Round 2, Kimzey was bucked off by Midnight Hammer. In the Championship Round, he rode Good Riddance for 90 points to finish fourth in the round. Kimzey finished sixth in the event.

On February 20-21, 2026, during the 10th event of the UTB season in Jacksonville, Florida, Kimzey rode Wall Street TNT for 87.4 points and finished third in Round 1. In Round 2, he rode Chupacabra for 83.75 points and finished eighth. In the Championship Round, Kimzey rematched with Lights Out and rode him for 90.75 points to win the round and overall event.

On March 6-7, 2026, during the 12th event of the season in Little Rock, Arkansas, Kimzey was bucked off by Frustrated Bulldog in Round 1. In Round 2, he rode Elmo for 89.35 points to win the round. In the Championship Round, Kimzey matched up with Lights Out once again and rode him for 91.55 points to win the round and overall event. It was the third UTB event win of the season for Kimzey and he had clinched the event title each time on the same bull.

The week of April 17-18, 2026, during the 17th event of the season in Billings, Montana, Kimzey rode Slim Pickens for 87.10 points to finish 12th in Round 1. His ride was also part of the Austin Gamblers' victory against the Kansas City Outlaws during the second round of the Monster Energy Team Challenge Semifinals, which moved them onto the Championship event against the Missouri Thunder at the following UTB tour stop in Tacoma, Washington. In Round 2, Kimzey was bucked off Wavy Bomb and failed to qualify for the Championship Round. He finished 16th in Billings.

In Tacoma, the Thunder defeated the Gamblers to win the inaugural Monster Energy Team Challenge Championship. Kimzey himself did not compete at the event due to injuries.

Kimzey qualified for his third consecutive and fourth overall PBR World Finals in 2026. On May 7, he rode Short Fire for 90.5 points to win Round 1. On May 8, he rode Lights Out for 92.6 points to also win Round 2. However, he bucked his next six bulls in a row and failed to qualify for the Championship Round. He finished 18th in the event and sixth in the final 2026 Unleash the Beast standings.

The Austin Gamblers finished second during the 2026 Team Series regular season. As a result, they received a first-round bye and automatically qualified for the second day of the Team Series Championship. They defeated the Texas Rattlers and moved on to the third and final day of competition. On the third day, the Gamblers were defeated by the Arizona Ridge Riders. In the game to see who would finish third, the Gamblers again defeated the Texas Rattlers.

=== PRCA career summary ===
- In 2016, at age 22 during the NFR, Kimzey became the youngest millionaire in PRCA history. His record has since been broken several times.
- His total PRCA career earnings are over $3.4 million, making him the richest bull rider in PRCA history.
- He qualified for the NFR nine times; in 2014, 2015, 2016, 2017, 2018, 2019, 2020, 2021, and 2023.
- He won seven PRCA bull riding world titles; in 2014, 2015, 2016, 2017, 2018, 2019 and 2021.
- He also won three NFR bull riding average titles; in 2014, 2017, and 2019.

== Awards ==
- 2014 Professional Rodeo Cowboys Association (PRCA) Bull Riding Rookie of the Year
- 2014 PRCA RAM Top Gun Award winner
- 2014, 2016-2017 Championship Bull Riding (CBR) World Champion
- 2014, 2017, 2019 National Finals Rodeo (NFR) Bull Riding Average champion
- 2014-2019, 2021 PRCA World Champion bull rider
- 2015-2016 RodeoHouston bull riding champion
- 2015, 2017, 2019 Calgary Stampede bull riding champion
- 2015, 2017-2019, 2021 PRCA Xtreme Bulls Tour Champion
- 2016 CBR World Finals event champion
- 2017, 2020 The American Rodeo bull riding champion (champion in 2017, co-champion in 2020 with João Ricardo Vieira)
- 2017 Professional Bull Riders (PBR) Velocity Tour Finals invitee and event champion
- 2017 PRCA Texas Circuit bull riding champion
- 2024 PBR World Finals event champion

== Career milestones ==
- 2013 College National Finals Rodeo (CNFR) qualifier
- 9-time National Finals Rodeo (NFR) qualifier (2014-2021, 2023)
- 5-time Championship Bull Riding (CBR) World Finals qualifier (2014-2018)
- 4-time Professional Bull Riders (PBR) World Finals qualifier (2017, 2024-2026; qualified in 2017 as a wild-card rider via winning the Velocity Tour Finals)
- Member of Team USA Eagles during the 2019 PBR Global Cup
- Member of Team Cooper Tires, champions of the 2020 PBR Monster Energy Team Challenge
- Drafted 1st overall in the 2023 PBR Teams Series Draft by the Carolina Cowboys
- Member of the Carolina Cowboys in 2023 and 2024
- Member of the Austin Gamblers since 2025

== Honors ==
In 2026, Kimzey was inducted into the Ellensburg Rodeo Hall of Fame.

== Personal life ==
Kimzey is married to his longtime girlfriend, Alexis Bloomer. After ten years as friends, then dating, then engagement, they were married on October 9, 2020, in Little Elm, Texas. They reside in Salado, Texas.

On January 25, 2022, the Kimzeys had their first child; Steele, a boy. In September 2024, they announced they were expecting a second child; another boy. On March 14, 2025, their second boy, Stone, was born.
