= Charlie Sampson =

American bull rider

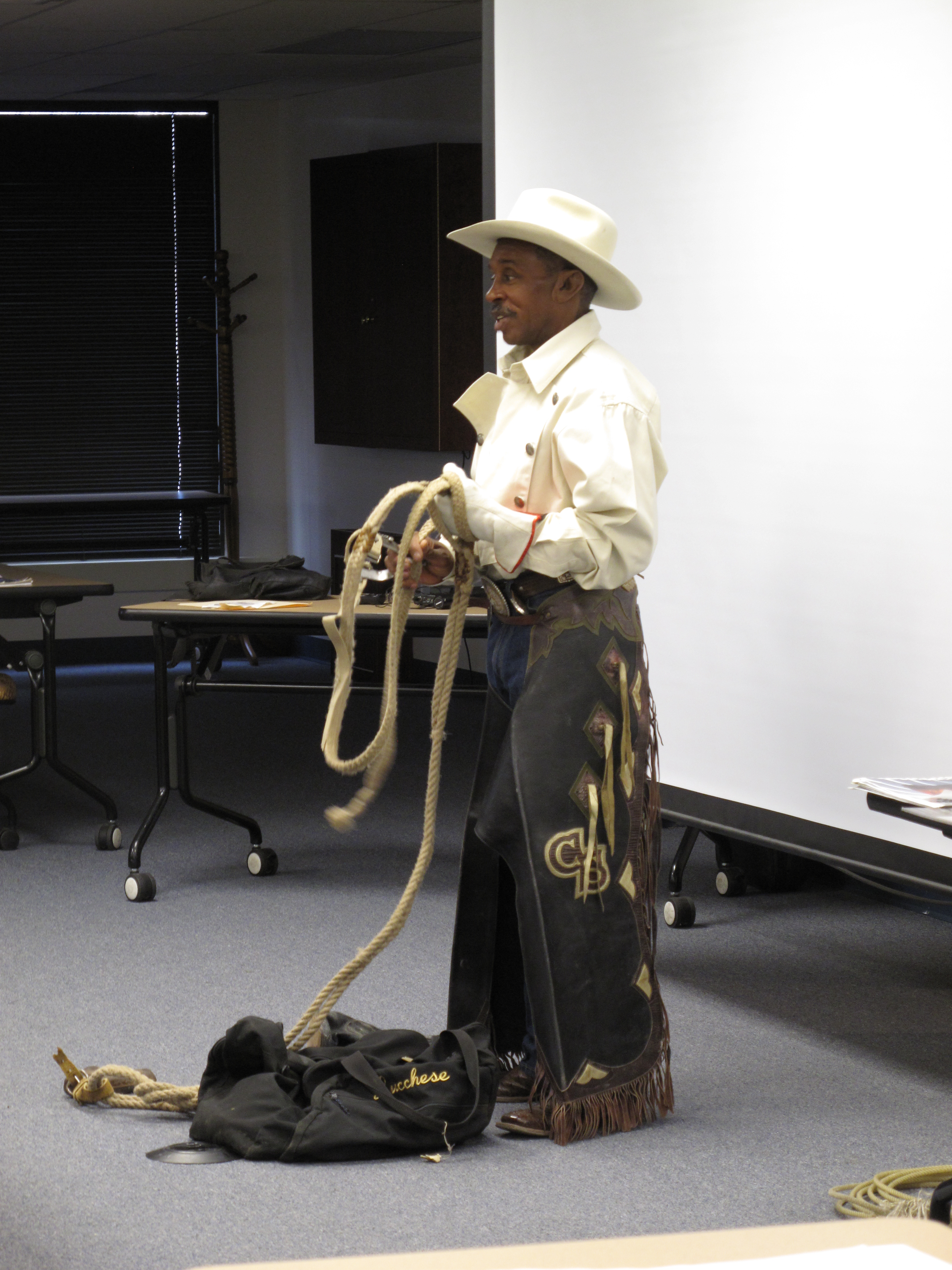
Sampson in full bull riding gear, presenting at an educational event in 2012

Charles Osgood Sampson (born July 2, 1957) is an American former professional rodeo cowboy who specialized in bull riding. He was the 1982 Professional Rodeo Cowboys Association (PRCA) World Champion bull rider. He is the first African-American cowboy to win a world championship in professional rodeo. He was inducted into the ProRodeo Hall of Fame in 1996.

== Early life ==
Charlie Sampson was born in Los Angeles, California, on July 2, 1957. To avoid the violence that surrounded him as a boy, he took a job at a riding stables near Gardena, California. There he sparked an interest in horses and rodeo. He was a fan of the famous African-American bull rider, Myrtis Dightman, who was known as the "Jackie Robinson of Rodeo".

== Career ==
Sampson stands 5 feet, 4 inches tall. He was a ground breaking rodeo cowboy. He was the first African American to win a world title in the PRCA. In 1983, there were only six black members of the PRCA. Sampson was competing on a national level. Sampson very rarely mentioned race as an issue, even though he was competing in a sport dominated by white competitors. Sampson once said in The New York Times, "I haven't encountered discrimination as much as ignorance. Some people still don't realize that something like a quarter of all the cowboys back in the old West were black." Currently he works at "Rimrock Dude Ranch" in Cody, Wyoming.

== Injuries ==
He is known for his many injuries as well. Sampson's left calf has 17 pins and two metal plates. In the New York Times Magazine, Sampson noted, "In 1983, a bull jerked me down and cracked my skull--I broke every bone in my face except my nose. I broke my ankle, my leg, my sternum, my wrist. In '88, I had an ear ripped off when a bull ran over me and his foot caught my hat." The 1983 ordeal was when his face was shattered at the 1983 PRCA Presidential Command Performance Rodeo in Landover, Maryland, with then-U.S. President Ronald Reagan witnessing the wreck. Sampson's PRCA career lasted almost 20 years, with 11 National Finals Rodeo (NFR) trips.

== Retirement ==
Sampson retired after the National Circuit Finals Rodeo in Pocatello, Idaho, in 1994. He spent his retirement doing ads for companies like Wrangler Jeans and Timex. In 1996, he was inducted into the ProRodeo Hall of Fame.

== Wins and awards ==
- PRCA World Champion bull rider, 1982
- PRCA Sierra Circuit bull riding champion, 1984
- Calgary Stampede bull riding champion, 1985
- PRCA Turquoise Circuit bull riding champion, 1985–86 and 1993
- Copenhagen/Skoal bull riding champion, 1992
- 2-time bull riding champion at Pendleton Round-Up
- 2-time Grand National Rodeo (Cow Palace) champion
- 2-time bull riding champion at California Rodeo Salinas
- 3-time champion of George Paul Memorial Bull Riding in Del Rio, Texas
- Rodeo Superstars Champion bull rider

== Honors ==
- 1996 ProRodeo Hall of Fame
- 2003 National Multicultural Western Heritage Museum and Hall of Fame
- 2004 PBR Ring of Honor
- 2008 Rodeo Hall of Fame of the National Cowboy and Western Heritage Museum
- 2009 Ellensburg Rodeo Hall of Fame
- 2019 Bull Riding Hall of Fame

== Personal life ==
Sampson attended Central Arizona College. He married Marilyn Casmon in 1984. Casmon hailed from Big Spring, Texas. The Sampsons had two sons: Laurence Charles who was born in 1984, and Daniel Carl who was born in 1988. They made their home in Aurora, Colorado.
