= Wesley Silcox =

American bull rider

Personal information
- Nickname: Wes
- Born: Wesley Silcox; May 30, 1985 (age 41) Payson, Utah, U.S.
- Height: 5 ft 8 in (1.73 m)
- Weight: 135 lb (61 kg)

Sport
- Sport: Rodeo
- Event: Bull riding
- Turned pro: 2004
- Retired: 2019

Achievements and titles
- Highest world ranking: 2007 PRCA Bull Riding World Champion

Wesley Silcox (born May 30, 1985) is an American former professional rodeo cowboy who specialized in bull riding. He competed in the Professional Rodeo Cowboys Association (PRCA) and Championship Bull Riding (CBR) circuits, and was the 2007 PRCA World Champion bull rider.

== Background ==
Wesley Silcox was born on May 30, 1985, in Payson, Utah. His first contact with rodeo was with team roping and tie-down roping. It was not until he attended Payson (Utah) High School that he tried bull riding. His father was a retired bull rider. Wesley watched DVDs to help learn the sport. He won the Utah State High School Rodeo Association bull riding title in 2003. He then qualified for the National High School Rodeo Association finals and placed fourth. He attended Utah Valley State College (West Orem).

== Career ==
Silcox joined the PRCA in 2004. In his rookie season, he finished 30th in the World Standings. In 2005, he qualified for the National Finals Rodeo (NFR) for the first time. He then qualified for the NFR from 2006 through 2008, 2010, 2011 and 2015.

In 2007, Silcox won the 2007 PRCA bull riding world championship. He also won the NFR Average Champion title that year. His total was 596 with 7 head out of 10.

He qualified in 2008, and then missed qualifying in 2009 by a small amount. Then he qualified for 2010 and 2011. Then he had a long stretch, not making it back again until 2015, and for the final time. In October, he competed at the Justin Boots Playoffs in Omaha, Nebraska, where he dislocated his shoulder. The Justin Sportsmedicine Team treated him on the spot. For last couple months, he had spent his time rehabbing and preparing for the NFR at the beginning of December. He entered the NFR in fourth place. Under his belt were six rodeo wins and two co-championships. His regular season earnings were $105,000, and he was expected to do well, taking into account his history at every past NFR. However, this was not his year. Although he won Rounds 5 and 10 and placed in Round 9, he suffered a concussion in Round 6. This concussion caused him to miss Rounds 7 and 8.

Silcox qualified for the National Circuit Finals Rodeo (NFCR) three times in 2006, 2011 and 2014. He was also the PRCA Xtreme Bulls Tour champion in 2010 with a total of $37,758.

Silcox also competed in the now-defunct Championship Bull Riding (CBR) organization, qualifying for its World Finals event seven times from 2005 through 2010. In 2012, he did not qualify for the event the normal way, but he and J.W. Harris were invited to compete at the event as a result of some riders not being able to compete at the event due to injuries and also because they were both superstar bull riders of the PRCA and CBR. Silcox and Harris would end up being the best-performing riders at the 2012 CBR World Finals, with Silcox winning the event average and Harris finishing second. Silcox would then qualify for the CBR World Finals in 2013, and win the event average for a second year in a row. He would compete at the CBR World Finals as a special-invite alternate rider again in 2017.

Silcox also occasionally competed in Professional Bull Riders (PBR) events that were close to his home.

Silcox's final professional bull riding outs were at the PRCA-sanctioned Fort Worth Stock Show & Rodeo in early 2019.

=== Championships/qualifications ===
- 7-time CBR World Finals qualifier (2005-2010, 2013); 2-time CBR World Finals alternate (2012, 2017)
- 7-time NFR qualifier (2005-2008, 2010-2011, 2015)
- 3-time NCFR qualifier (2006, 2011, 2014)
- 2007 PRCA World Champion bull rider
- 2007 NFR Bull Riding Average champion
- 2010 PRCA Xtreme Bulls Tour champion
- 2012 CBR World Finals Average champion
- 2013 CBR World Finals Average champion

== Personal life ==
Silcox married Jerika Sperry on October 15, 2010. They live in Santaquin, Utah, with their son and daughter. He is an avid hunter and sportsman. He suffered some injuries by the bulls Crossfire Hurricane and Western Rodeo's Dippin' Dots.

== Honors ==
In 2026, Silcox was inducted into the Bull Riding Hall of Fame.
