= Pikes Peak or Bust Rodeo =

Annual rodeo in Colorado

Coordinates: 38°49′23″N 104°50′56″W

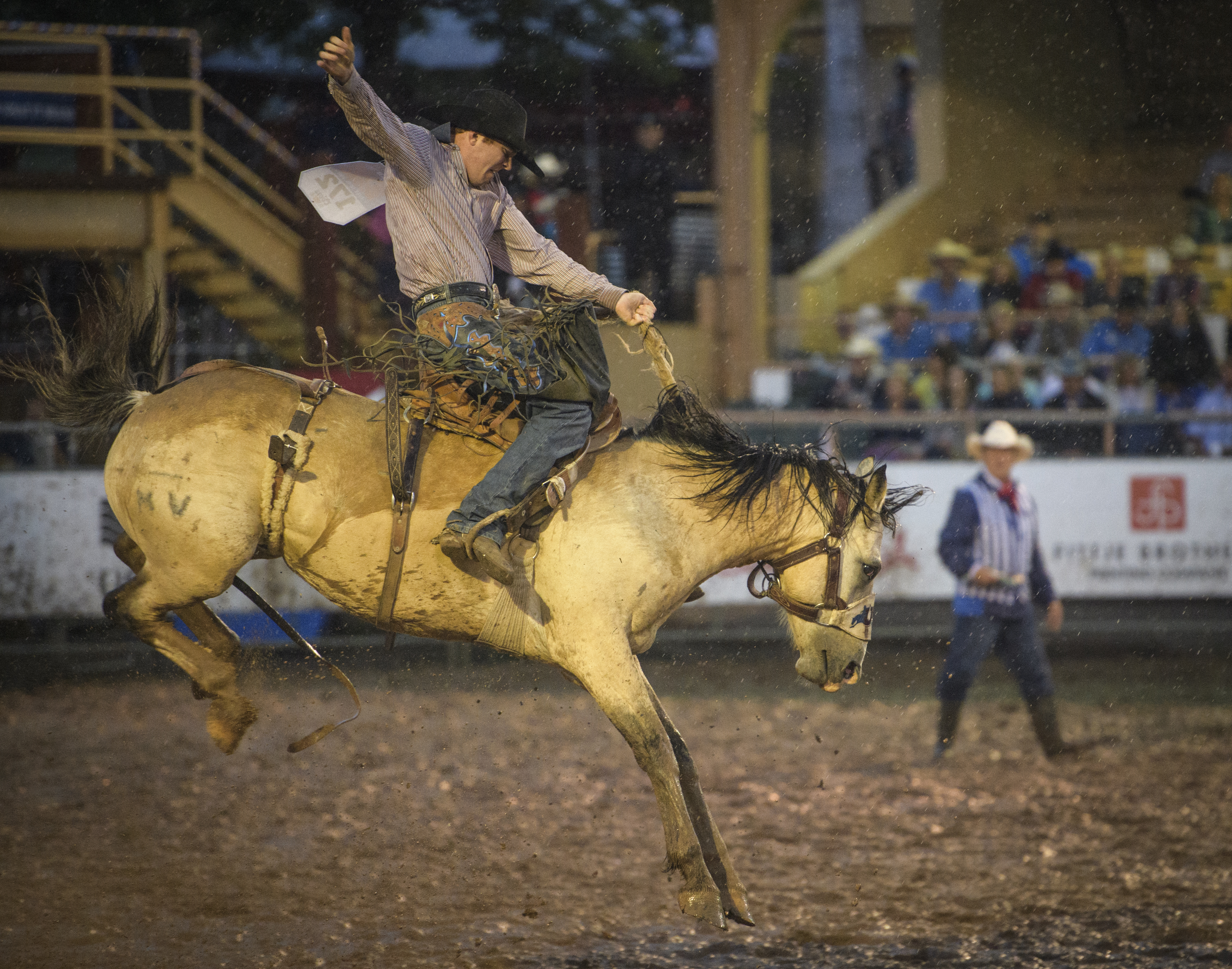
Saddle bronc riding at the Pikes Peak or Bust Rodeo

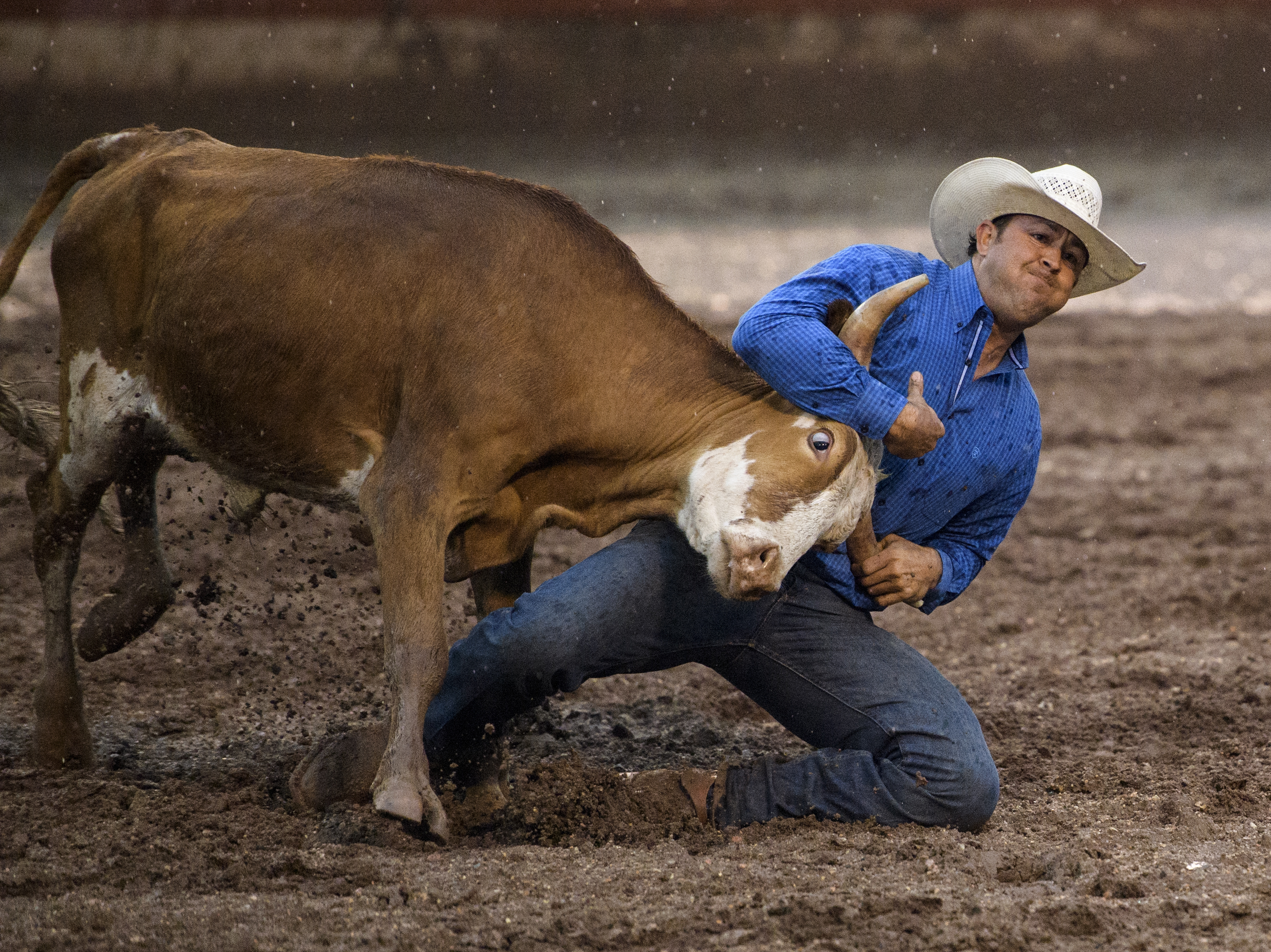
Steer wrestling at the Pikes Peak or Bust Rodeo

The Pikes Peak or Bust Rodeo is a rodeo that takes place in Colorado Springs, Colorado, United States, every July. It was sanctioned by the Professional Rodeo Cowboys Association (PRCA) for many years. However, from 2014 through 2017, it was unsanctioned. Since 2018, it is once again a PRCA-sanctioned rodeo. The rodeo dates back to 1937. In 2008, it was inducted into the ProRodeo Hall of Fame in Colorado Springs.

The rodeo went on hiatus from 1942 to 1945 because of World War II and again in 2020 because of the COVID-19 pandemic.

In 2022, the Pikes Peak or Bust Rodeo became the home of the NFR Open, formerly known as the National Circuit Finals Rodeo (NCFR).
