= L.J. Jenkins =

American bull rider

Personal information
- Full name: Larry Dean Jenkins Jr.
- Nickname: L.J.
- Born: July 17, 1987 (age 39) Strafford, Missouri, U.S.
- Height: 5 ft 10 in (1.78 m) (2019)
- Weight: 170 lb (77 kg) (2019)

Sport
- Sport: Rodeo
- Event: Bull riding
- Turned pro: 2005
- Retired: 2015

Achievements and titles
- Highest world ranking: 2006 PBR World Finals Event Champion

Larry Dean Jenkins Jr. (born July 17, 1987) is an American former professional rodeo cowboy who specialized in bull riding. He competed in the Professional Bull Riders (PBR) and Professional Rodeo Cowboys Association (PRCA) circuits.

Jenkins is one of only four bull riders in history (the other three being Ted Nuce, Ty Murray and Sage Kimzey) to win both the PBR World Finals and the National Finals Rodeo (NFR).

== Background ==
Jenkins was born on July 17, 1987, on his father's ranch in Strafford, Missouri. He grew up in Highlandville and the Springfield area. He is 5 feet, 10 inches tall, and weighed 170 pounds while competing. His nickname is the initials of his first and last names.

During his early career, Jenkins lived in Texico, New Mexico, where he attended Texico High School.

== Career ==
Jenkins qualified for the PBR World Finals 11 consecutive times (2005 to 2015) and won the PBR World Finals event in 2006. He competed briefly in the Championship Bull Riding (CBR) tour from 2004 to 2005 and qualified for the CBR World Finals in 2004. He also competed briefly on the PRCA circuit from 2009 to 2012 and qualified for the PRCA's National Finals Rodeo in 2011 where he won the average title in the bull riding.

Jenkins competed the first few years of his professional career with a cowboy hat. However, by the middle of the 2009 season, he was riding with a helmet.

After fracturing his C1 vertebra at the 2015 Built Ford Tough Series event in Nampa, Idaho, Jenkins made the decision to retire from bull riding in the summer of that year, thus missing his 11th consecutive trip to the PBR World Finals (which he had qualified for). His total PBR career earnings amounted to over $1.8 million. In 2016, Jenkins was inducted into the Missouri Sports Hall of Fame. Since retiring, Jenkins has become a bucking bull stock contractor, providing his own bulls to various events (including PBR events).

In December 2017, Jenkins came out of retirement for one final bull ride in the form of an exhibition at an event in Claremore, Oklahoma, where he successfully rode his bull for eight seconds. He rode with a cowboy hat. He now runs his own semi-professional organization: the L.J. Jenkins Bull Riding Tour.

== Personal life ==
Jenkins resides outside Porum, Oklahoma, on a 600 acre cattle ranch.
