= Shane Proctor =

American rodeo cowboy

Personal information
- Full name: Shane Proctor
- Born: March 24, 1985 (age 41) Grand Coulee, Washington, U.S.
- Height: 5 ft 8 in (1.73 m) (2019)
- Weight: 165 lb (75 kg) (2019)

Sport
- Sport: Rodeo
- Events: Bull riding Bronc riding
- Turned pro: 2005

Achievements and titles
- Highest world ranking: 2011 PRCA Bull Riding World Champion; 2011 PBR Touring Pro Division Champion

Shane Proctor (born March 24, 1985) is an American professional rodeo cowboy. He is the 2011 Professional Rodeo Cowboys Association (PRCA) world champion bull rider.

== Early life ==
Shane Proctor was born on March 24, 1985, in Grand Coulee, Washington.

== Career ==
Proctor competes in the Professional Rodeo Cowboys Association. He also competed in the Professional Bull Riders (PBR), as well as the now-defunct Championship Bull Riding (CBR) circuit. He is the 2011 PRCA world champion bull rider, and has qualified for the PRCA's National Finals Rodeo (NFR) six times (2011 to 2013, 2015 to 2016 and 2021) in bull riding and the PBR World Finals nine times (2006, 2008 to 2011, 2013, and 2015 to 2017). Apart from being a bull rider, he is also a bareback and saddle bronc rider.

Proctor made his debut on the PBR's elite series, the Built Ford Tough Series in 2006. In January 2010, at Madison Square Garden, in New York City, New York, Proctor rode 2008 and 2010 World Champion Bull Bones for 91.25 points. Bones scored 44.5 points, just an average score for a bull of his calibre. Proctor won the event that weekend. In April 2017, in an event in Tacoma, Washington, Proctor rode World Champion Bull contender Pearl Harbor for 93.50 points. The bull scored 45.75, a very good score for a high calibre bull. The ride won him the 15/15 Bucking Battle. "Riding in my home state, it doesn’t get much better than that,” Proctor said. “Definitely probably the highlight of my career." In 2011, prior to winning the PRCA bull riding world championship, Proctor won the PRCA Xtreme Bulls tour championship as well as the PBR Touring Pro Division championship.

Proctor has qualified for the NFR five times. Four of those times he also had qualified for the PBR World Finals, including when he won the PRCA World Bull Riding Champion title. "That is one of the biggest things I take pride in," Proctor said. "When it comes down to it, I was good in both associations, but I was never great. I would like to be a great cowboy. The guys I looked up to were Ty Murray and Cody Lambert. Guys that did the all-around."

On Friday, January 6, 2018, after completing his last PBR event at Madison Square Garden, Proctor announced his intention to leave the PBR in order to pursue an all-around title in the PRCA. Proctor had spent several years competing in both circuits, but was focusing solely on the PRCA as of January 2018. "Proctor has long been considered a better bronc rider than bull rider, but bull riding was something that Proctor knew would always pay the bills better for him": Since his PBR debut, he has earned $1.3 million. He almost won a couple years ago, but fell short by $400 in one event (you have to win at least $3,000 in two events). He also felt it was time for another roughstock athlete to win the event. The last time was when Ty Murray won the title in 1998. Stetson Wright later won the first PRCA All-Around world title by a roughstock cowboy in 21 years in 2019.

In the summer of 2020, Proctor accepted an invitation to compete in the PBR's Monster Energy Team Challenge, a temporary series of events in which several teams of riders competed for a large amount of money. These events were held at the South Point Hotel Arena in Las Vegas, Nevada. No fans were allowed to attend due to the COVID-19 pandemic. However, the championship event at the Denny Sanford Premier Center in Sioux Falls, South Dakota, did consist of a limited and socially distanced crowd.

In 2021, Proctor returned to riding in the PBR and won the Velocity Tour event in Pensacola, Florida, in April. As a result, he was invited to compete at the Unleash the Beast Series event in Sioux Falls, South Dakota. Prior to the event, Proctor stated that he did not wish to compete full-time in the Unleash the Beast Series. He ended up bucking off all his bulls in Sioux Falls.

Proctor eventually returned to riding full-time in the PRCA. He announced that 2024 would be his final year competing in bull riding, but that he would continue riding broncs.

== Personal life ==
Proctor currently resides in Delaware, Oklahoma, with his wife Hayley, whom he married in 2019. Their daughter was born in 2020. In his previous marriage, Proctor was married to two-time PBR world champion J.B. Mauney's sister, Jessi.

== Honors ==
In 2026, Proctor was inducted into the Bull Riding Hall of Fame.
