= Myrtis Dightman =

American bull rider

- Born: May 7, 1935 (age 91); Houston County, Texas, U.S.
- Other name: "Jackie Robinson of Rodeo"
- Occupation: Bull rider
- Known for: Rodeo
- Spouse: Fannie Mae (div.)
- Parent(s): Odie Dightman and Ada Lee Polk

Myrtis Dightman (born May 7, 1935) is an American former professional rodeo cowboy who specialized in bull riding. Known as the "Jackie Robinson of Rodeo", Dightman was the first African American to compete at the National Finals Rodeo.

== Early life ==
Dightman was born on May 7, 1935, on a 4,000-acre ranch in Houston County near Crockett, Texas. His father worked for rancher Karl Leediker.

== Career ==
Dightman started his career in rodeo in Houston. In 1964, he became the first black cowboy to compete at the National Finals Rodeo (NFR). He qualified for the NFR in 1966, 1967, 1968, 1969, 1970, and 1972. In 1967, he had the best year-end finish of his career by placing third in the Rodeo Cowboys Association (RCA) world standings. In 1971, he won Cheyenne Frontier Days.

Dightman was hired to do stunts and play as himself in the rodeo movies J.W. Coop (1972) directed by Cliff Robertson, and Sam Peckinpah's Junior Bonner (1971).

Dightman was a big influence on Charlie Sampson. In October 2006, a benefit concert featuring Michael Martin Murphey and Don Edwards was held to raise funds for a bronze statue in his honor. The statute was placed at the entrance of the Porth Ag Arena in Crockett, Texas. This rodeo arena hosts the annual Labor Day Rodeo that bears his name.

== Honors ==
- 1970 Calgary Stampede Guy Weadick Award
- 1997 Rodeo Hall of Fame of the National Cowboy and Western Heritage Museum
- 2001 Texas Rodeo Cowboy Hall of Fame
- 2003 National Multicultural Western Heritage Museum
- 2003 PBR Ring of Honor
- 2011 Texas Cowboy Hall of Fame
- 2016 Bull Riding Hall of Fame
- 2016 ProRodeo Hall of Fame
- 2025 All Cowboy & Arena Champions Hall of Fame
