= Frost Bank Center =

Arena in San Antonio, Texas, United States

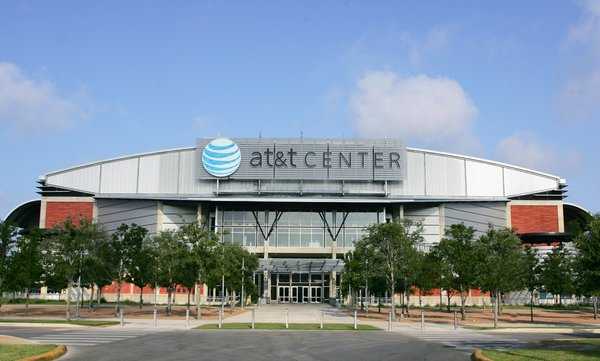
- Arena as AT&T Center in 2014

- Location in Texas Location in the United States
- Former names: SBC Center (2002–2006); AT&T Center (2006–2023)
- Address: 1 Frost Bank Center Drive
- Location: San Antonio, Texas, U.S.
- Coordinates: 29°25′37″N 98°26′15″W
- Owner: Bexar County
- Operator: Spurs Sports & Entertainment
- Capacity: Basketball: 19,217 (2002–2003); 18,797 (2003–2009); 18,581 (2009–2015); 18,418 (2015–present); Ice Hockey: 16,151 (6,374 with curtain system); Concert: 19,000 (maximum capacity)
- Surface: Multi-surface
- Field size: 750,500 sq ft (69,720 m^{2})

Construction
- Groundbreaking: August 24, 2000
- Opened: October 18, 2002
- Cost: US$186 million (US$333 million in 2025 dollars)
- Architects: Ellerbe Becket; Kell Muñoz Architects; Lake Flato Architects
- Project manager: Project Control
- Structural engineers: Jaster-Quintanilla & Associates
- Services engineer: Goetting/Curtis Neal
- General contractor: Hunt/SpawGlass

Tenants
- San Antonio Rampage (AHL) (2002–2020); San Antonio Spurs (NBA) (2002–present); San Antonio Stars (WNBA) (2003–2017)

Website
- frostbankcenter.com

Frost Bank Center is a multi-purpose indoor arena on the east side of San Antonio, Texas, United States. Opened in 2002, the arena is the home of the San Antonio Spurs of the National Basketball Association (NBA) and is sponsored by Frost Bank.

The arena opened as the SBC Center, before changing its name to the AT&T Center. From 2003 to 2017, the arena was home to the San Antonio Stars of the Women's National Basketball Association. It was the home of the San Antonio Rampage of the American Hockey League for 18 years (2002-2020).

== Design ==
The arena's basic design is similar to other NBA arenas built around the same time, thanks to the choice of Minneapolis-based Ellerbe Becket as the primary architects (the firm previously designed the Gainbridge Fieldhouse in Indianapolis and Capital One Arena in Washington, D.C.). Local architecture firm Lake Flato partnered with Ellerbe Becket to incorporate Southern Texas design to the structure.

=== Capacity ===
Frost Bank Center seats 18,418 for basketball and 19,000 for concerts and events (it also contains 2,018 club seats and 50 luxury suites).

While most arenas can accommodate basketball and ice hockey, the Frost Bank Center was primarily designed for basketball. It can accommodate an NHL-sized ice hockey rink, but with a maximum audience of 16,151. There are only a few permanent rows of seating on the lower level of the west end, and all of the upper-level sets on the west end of the arena have obstructed views. This would result in poor sightlines; however, the seating capacity for Rampage games was under 7,000 people, making the upper level not necessary for those events.

== History ==
=== Previous arena ===
Previously, the San Antonio Spurs played at the Alamodome, a multi-purpose facility built primarily to attract an NFL team to San Antonio, as well as more concerts and conventions. It also had a configuration that allowed half the floor space to be used for basketball. The Alamodome's seating capacity could be expanded to 35,000 for popular regular-season opponents, and attracted nearly 40,000 for a 1999 NBA Finals game.

The Spurs and their fans grew increasingly dissatisfied with the facility because of its poor sight lines. The Alamodome's basketball configuration had the basketball court at one end of where the football field would have been, leaving almost half of the stadium curtained off. The Spurs' deep playoff runs (eight appearances in nine years) tied up the Alamodome well into the spring, making it difficult to schedule contiguous dates for conventions or a regular-season football schedule.

=== Building of a new arena ===
The Spurs campaigned for several years for a new facility. The Spurs and the city of San Antonio had come to an agreement to build a new facility adjacent to the Alamodome, but in a last-minute reversal, the team partnered with Bexar County to construct a new arena adjacent to the Freeman Coliseum. As a part of the agreement, the facility would be home to the Spurs, a new ice hockey team (what became the Rampage), and the San Antonio Stock Show & Rodeo event.

The facility was funded through an increase of hotel and car rental taxes, and Bexar County voters approved the plan in November 1999. The election was held on the same day the Spurs received their rings for their first NBA championship.

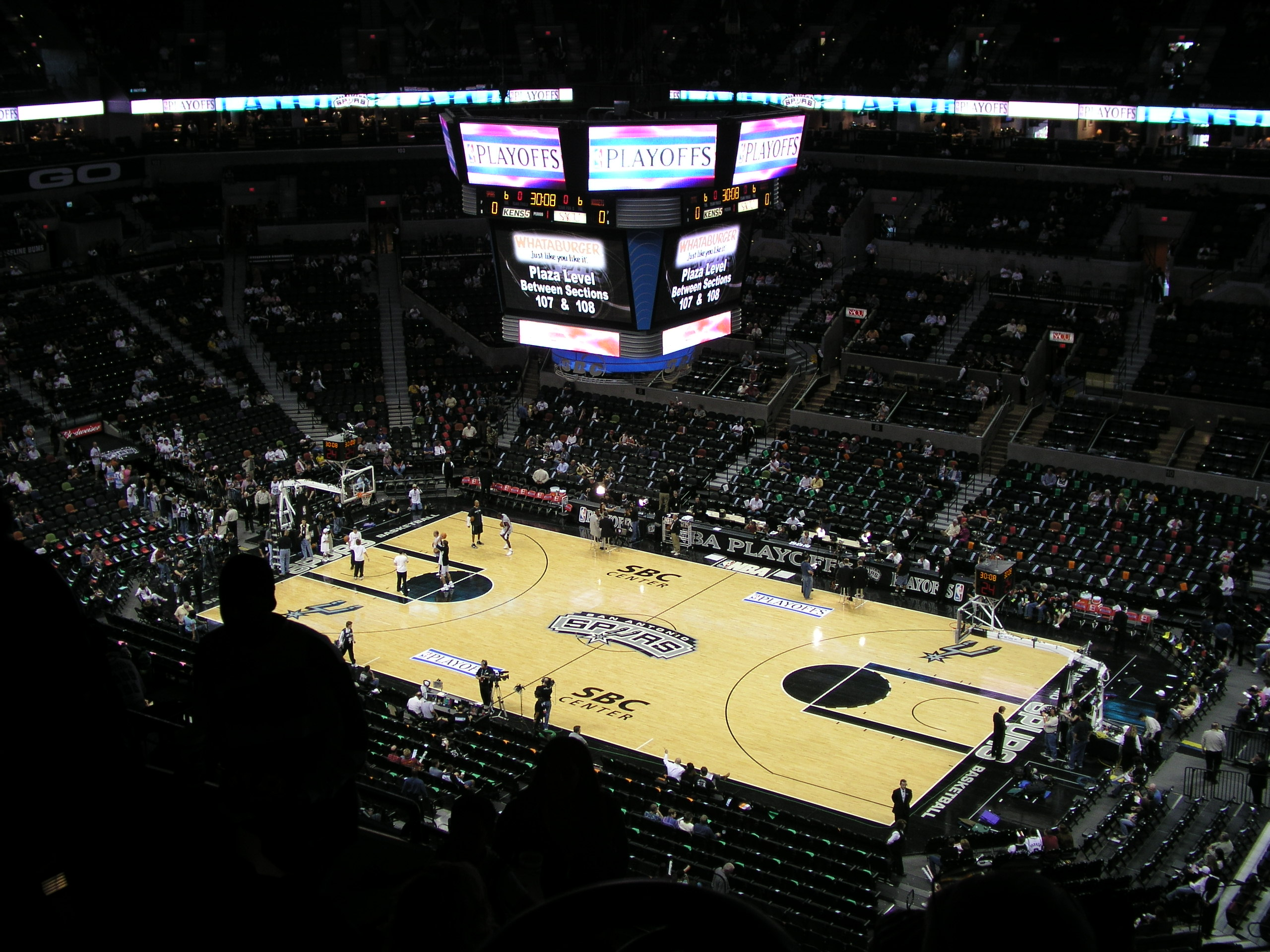
Inside the Frost Bank Center

=== Construction ===
After the arena referendum passed, planning quickly began for construction on the new facility. In July 2000, SBC Communications (now AT&T Inc.) purchased the naming rights to the facility under a 20-year, $41 million naming rights agreement with Bexar County, the San Antonio Spurs, and the San Antonio Stock Show & Rodeo. SBC Communications changed its name to AT&T Inc. in November 2005, and the arena officially changed its name to AT&T Center in January 2006.

Ground was officially broken on the facility in August 2000. The arena opened in 2002 as the SBC Center, at a cost of US$175 million, financed by county-issued bonds, which were supported by a hotel-occupancy and car-rental tax increase and an additional contribution of $28.5 million from the Spurs.

The Jessica Redfield Press Box.

In 2012, the Rampage renamed the press box to the "Jessica Redfield Press Box" after Jessica Redfield, an aspiring news broadcaster and a former team intern who was killed in the Aurora theater shooting.

=== Renovations ===
On December 9, 2014, the Bexar County Commissioners Court gave Spurs Sports and Entertainment permission to begin up to US$101.5 million in renovations to the AT&T Center.

The renovations began in the summer of 2015, after the San Antonio Spurs finished the 2015 season. They included a new scoreboard, updated televisions inside and outside of the arena, a new state-of-the-art sound system, and improved Wi-Fi that covers about 90% of the venue. Expansions to the fan shop and other major parts of the AT&T Center were also in the plans. The renovations were funded by a 2008 tax increase for improvements to the Tobin Center, parts of the Mission Reach expansion, and the rodeo grounds located next to the AT&T Center.

=== Frost Bank sponsorship ===
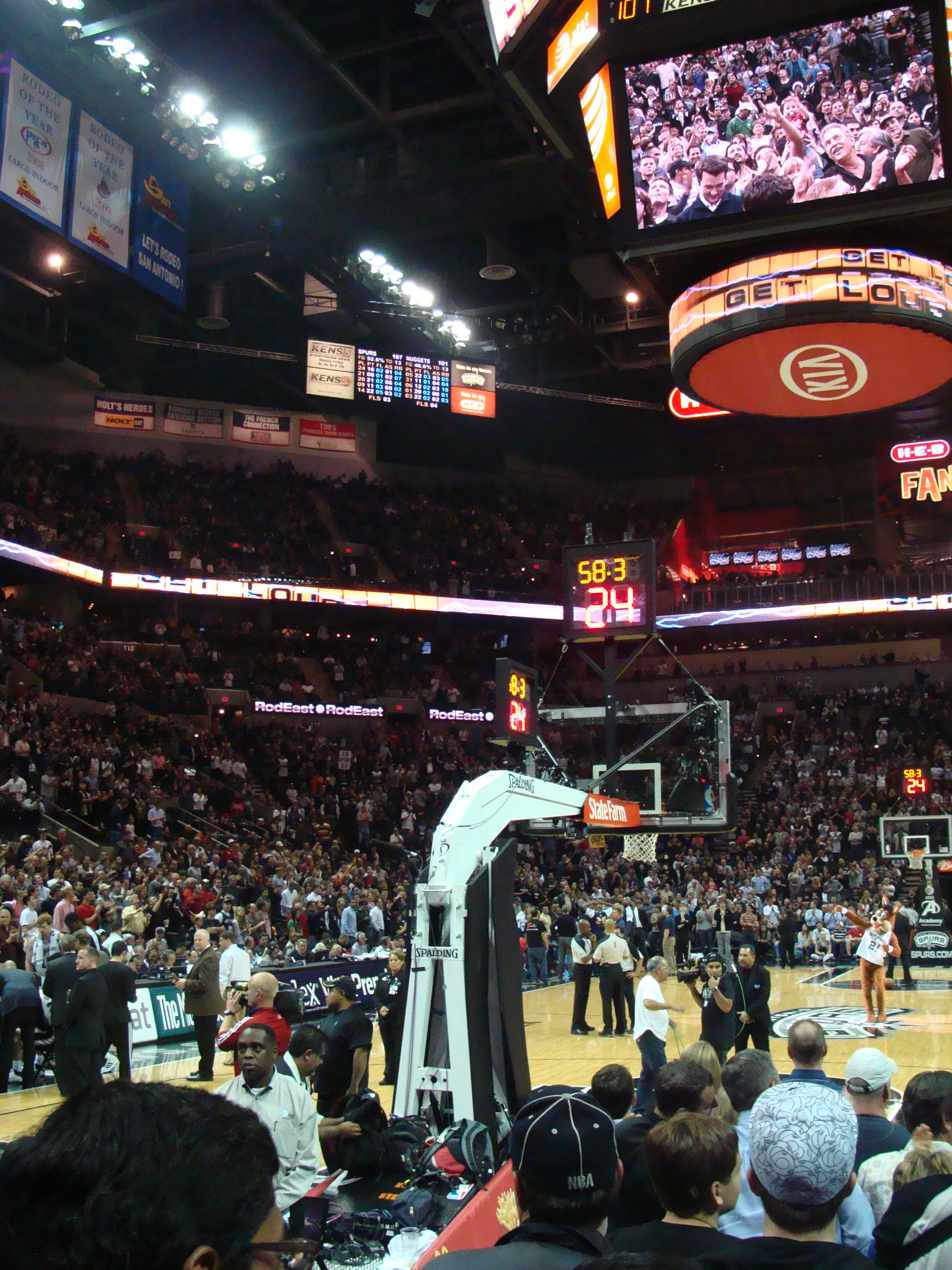
The Spurs-Nuggets game at the AT&T Center in December 2010

On July 2, 2021, it was announced that AT&T would not be renewing its contract for naming rights to the venue.

Two years later, on August 3, 2023, it was announced that Frost Bank would be the arena sponsor. The name change to Frost Bank Center became official on September 22, 2023, with the arena's website and social media accounts reflecting the change immediately and the building signage updated soon after.

=== Future of the arena ===
In November 2024, the city of San Antonio revealed plans for a new downtown district located near the Alamodome and the Tower of the Americas that would include a new arena as well as a new convention center, hotel tower and acres of retail and residential development, and improvements to the Alamodome. The Spurs have committed to $1 billion dollars for the district with further funding coming from the city, Bexar County, and other sources. The timeline proposed would see the Spurs arena, Convention Center expansion, Convention Center hotel, entertainment venue and mixed-use development completed or under construction in the next one to five years. The financing plan was approved in August 2025. Public funding for the arena was approved in November 2025 with the goal to have the new arena ready by 2032.

== Notable events ==
=== Basketball ===
Frost Bank Center hosted the 2003, 2005, 2007, 2013, 2014, and 2026 NBA Finals. The Spurs won the 2003, 2005 and 2014 championships at the arena while the New York Knicks in 2026 became the first visiting team to win the championship at Frost Bank Center.

On April 10, 2019, Dirk Nowitzki of the Dallas Mavericks played his final NBA game at the arena in a 94–105 loss to the Spurs. A tribute video on behalf of the Spurs was shown and Nowitzki was moved to tears as the sold-out crowd congratulated him.

=== UFC and WWE ===
The arena has hosted many WWE events, including numerous episodes of WWE Raw and WWE SmackDown and the following pay-per-views: Royal Rumble (2007), TLC: Tables, Ladders & Chairs (2009), Vengeance (2011), Hell in a Cell (2018). The arena also hosted Saturday Night's Main Event on January 25, 2025 and an episode of AEW Collision on December 23, 2023.

On June 28, 2014, UFC Fight Night: Swanson vs. Stephens was held at the arena. On July 20, 2019, UFC on ESPN: dos Anjos vs. Edwards was held at the arena. The event broke the record for most decisions in a row on one fight card. On March 25, 2023, UFC on ESPN: Vera vs. Sandhagen was held at the arena. On September 13, 2025, the UFC held its third annual "Noche UFC" event at the arena for Noche UFC: Lopes vs. Silva.

=== Music ===
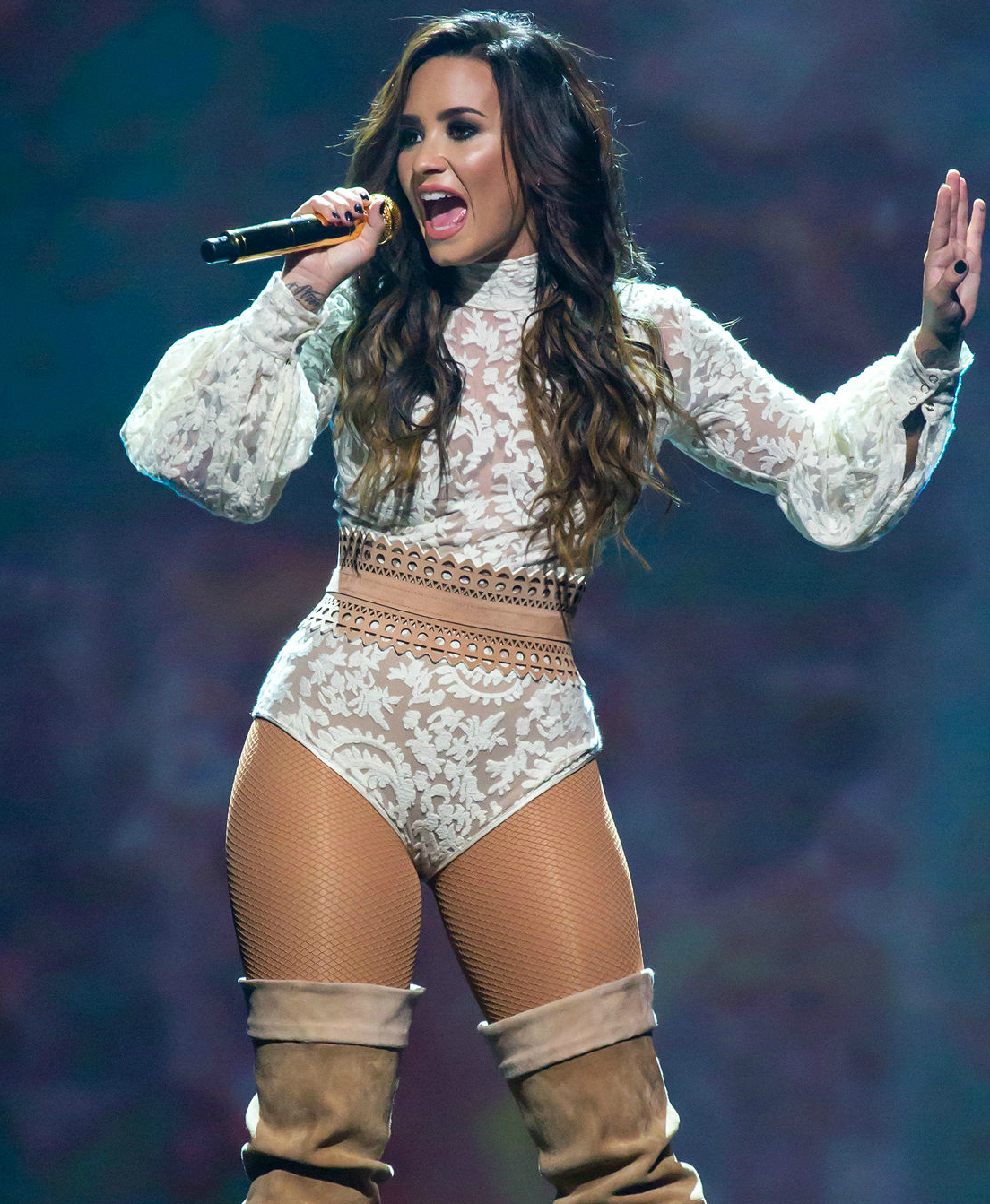
Demi Lovato performing at the arena on the Future Now Tour in 2016.

In 2016, Black Sabbath played their final United States show at the Frost Bank Center on November 12th.

Later that year, Demi Lovato and Nick Jonas played in the arena on September 10th for their Future Now Tour.

In November 2026, Deftones announced an arena show at Frost Bank Center for the following year. A day later, Phoebe Bridgers announced she would play several nights at the arena in May 2027.

=== Other events ===
In addition to many local community and sporting events, the center hosts San Antonio Sports Car Association autocross competitions in the parking lot each month.

The Professional Rodeo Cowboys Association holds the San Antonio Stock Show & Rodeo and an Xtreme Bulls tour event annually there.

On the weekend of August 1–2, 2009, the Professional Bull Riders hosted a Built Ford Tough Series event there (an event previously held at the Alamodome in 2007 and 2008). Since May 2013, the venue has also hosted the annual Bud Light River City Rockfest.

On October 1, 2016, the arena hosted the Kellogg's Tour of Gymnastics Champions.

Events and tenants
Preceded by Alamodome	Home of the San Antonio Spurs; 2002 – present	Succeeded by current
Preceded by American Airlines Arena	Home of the Royal Rumble; 2007	Succeeded by Madison Square Garden
Preceded by Delta Center (as Utah Starzz)	Home of the San Antonio Stars; 2003 – 2017	Succeeded by Mandalay Bay Events Center (as Las Vegas Aces)
