= Don Gay =

American bull rider

Donald "Donnie" Gay (born September 18, 1953) is an American former professional rodeo cowboy who specialized in bull riding. He won eight Professional Rodeo Cowboys Association (PRCA) bull riding world championships; a record as of 2025. His father, Neal Gay, was a well-known rodeo competitor and later rodeo producer and stock contractor. Don was inducted into the ProRodeo Hall of Fame in 1979; Neal was inducted in 1993. In 2015, Don was inducted into the Bull Riding Hall of Fame.

== Early life ==
Don Gay was born on September 18, 1953, in Mesquite, Texas, to Neal Gay and Evelyn "Cookie" Foster. He was only a year old when his mother died of leukemia. Don's father then married Kay Gay, who raised Don and his brother Pete as her own. Don grew up in Mesquite, Texas, and started competing in rodeos at age six. His father ran the Mesquite Rodeo, which still operates today. He used Mesquite to perfect his skills on both bulls and broncs. He attended Mesquite High School.

== Rodeo career ==
Gay received his PRCA permit shortly after graduating from high school and began traveling the rodeo circuit. He soon received his pilot's license and began flying himself to rodeo events in a private plane. He won almost every major rodeo in the United States at some point during his career. He won the first of eight world titles in 1974. He went on to win in 1975, 1976, and 1977. He also won the NFR bull riding average title in 1976. His next four world titles came in 1979, 1980, 1981, and 1984. The record of eight world titles in bull riding still stands. He qualified for the National Finals Rodeo (NFR) 13 times (1972 to 1982, then 1984 and 1985). Gay officially retired from professional rodeo in 1989.

== Post-rodeo career ==
From 1989 to 1996, Gay was a stock contractor as the owner of All-Star Rodeo, providing livestock to professional rodeos and bull riding events across the United States. Since 2002, he has been the general manager for Frontier Rodeo Company. He also does live announcing at a number of rodeos. He has also provided commentary for televised rodeo and bull riding events.

From the 1980s through 2000s, Gay was a commentator for the Mesquite Championship Rodeo when the weekly event was televised. Around the same time, he was also a commentator for other televised regular-season PRCA rodeos.

He also provided commentary for

- Professional Bull Riders events on TNN from 1993 through 2001,
- PRCA Xtreme Bulls events on ESPN from 2003 through 2010 and Great American Country (GAC) from 2011 through 2013,
- Toughest Cowboy on Fox Sports Networks (FSN) in 2007 and 2008,
- Championship Bull Riding events on GAC in 2009 and 2010,
- the Tuff Hedeman Bull Riding Tour (TBHRT) on The Cowboy Channel in 2018,
- the bull riding during the live telecasts of the National Finals Rodeo each December from 2003 through 2017 and again since 2020 .

Starting in 2011, Gay began running his own semi-professional bull riding organization, the Don Gay Bull Riding Tour, which sanctioned events in some southern U.S. states. In 2016, this organization was renamed the Rank Bull Rider Tour. After its 2017 finals event, the Rank Bull Rider Tour became defunct.

== Legacy ==
Don was inducted into the ProRodeo Hall of Fame in 1979; his father Neal was inducted in 1993. In 1997, he received the PBR Ring of Honor. In 2015, Don was inducted into the Bull Riding Hall of Fame. In 2007, Gay was inducted into the Texas Rodeo Cowboy Hall of Fame along with his brothers Pete and Jim. In 2006, the ProRodeo Hall of Fame created the Legends of ProRodeo award which is awarded annually. Both Don and his father Neal have received this award. Don received it in 2013, and Neal received it in 2016. The award is given to individuals who have retired from participating in the sport of rodeo but have tirelessly continued to contribute to the sport afterwards.

== Honors ==
- 1979 ProRodeo Hall of Fame
- 1996 Texas Sports Hall of Fame
- 1997 PBR Ring of Honor
- 2000 Texas Cowboy Hall of Fame
- 2007 Texas Rodeo Cowboy Hall of Fame
- 2008 Rodeo Hall of Fame of the National Cowboy and Western Heritage Museum
- 2013 Legends of ProRodeo
- 2015 Molalla Walk of Fame
- 2015 Bull Riding Hall of Fame
