= San Antonio Stock Show & Rodeo =

Annual livestock show and rodeo in Texas, US

Coordinates: 29.427°N 98.440°W

The San Antonio Stock Show & Rodeo is a livestock show and rodeo held in San Antonio, Texas annually during the month of February. It is part of the Professional Rodeo Cowboys Association (PRCA) schedule. For 14 consecutive years it was awarded the PRCA Large Indoor Rodeo of the Year. Along with the rodeo, the event also includes live entertainment from major recording artists, family-friendly exhibits, a carnival, and shopping. It is estimated that 1.3 million people attended the 2022 event. Along with Fiesta San Antonio, the rodeo is considered a top event for the city.

== History ==
Opening of the rodeo.

While the establishment of the organization took place in 1949, the first rodeo occurred in 1950. Since then, the annual event takes place over three weeks in February.

The rodeo began in the Joe & Harry Freeman Coliseum until 2003 when its primary events moved into the AT&T Center (now known as the Frost Bank Center). The adjacent Freeman Coliseum became available to add on-site access for retailers to sell western wear, furniture and other items during the annual rodeo. The San Antonio Spurs of the NBA who are the primary tenants of the arena, spend 3 weeks playing only away games while the rodeo is in town, dubbed the "Rodeo Road Trip".

The Western Heritage Parade & Cattle Drive is the kick-off for the San Antonio Stock Show & Rodeo and celebrates Texas heritage. The mile long route through the streets of downtown San Antonio.

Hadley Barrett (1929–2017), for twenty-eight years the voice of the San Antonio Rodeo, had just completed announcing twenty-one rodeo performances a few days before he died of heart failure in Colorado on March 2, 2017. According to the San Antonio Express-News, Barrett was known for his "distinctive voice and folksy blend of cornball jokes, faith, patriotism, and rodeo wisdom." A native of North Platte, Nebraska, Barrett was reared on a ranch, was a weekend bull-rider, and a traveling musician who with his brothers under the name Hadley Barrett and the Westerners performed with, among others, Carl Perkins and Little Jimmy Dickens. He also announced for other rodeos, the Calgary Stampede, the Canadian Finals, and Cheyenne Frontier Days in Wyoming.

2021 saw the carnival & charreada part go on hiatus, but other parts continued during the COVID-19 pandemic.

== Supporting groups ==
The San Antonio Livestock Exposition, Inc. was established with the mission "A volunteer organization that emphasizes agriculture and education to develop the youth of Texas". The focus on educating the youth of Texas lead to integrating 4-H and FFA high school students and making educational commitments to support their interest in the agricultural and livestock industry. In 1984, the scholarship program began when fifteen, four-year scholarships totaling $90,000 to were awarded to students entering Texas colleges in the fall. Since then, the organization has committed more than $186 million to the youth of Texas through scholarships, grants, endowments, junior livestock auctions, youth western art auction, calf scramble program and show premiums.

Production of the event requires over 6,000 volunteers.

== Awards ==
- 2005 PRCA Large Indoor Rodeo of the Year
- 2006 PRCA Large Indoor Rodeo of the Year
- 2007 PRCA Large Indoor Rodeo of the Year
- 2008 ProRodeo Hall of Fame
- 2008 PRCA Large Indoor Rodeo of the Year
- 2009 PRCA Large Indoor Rodeo of the Year
- 2010 PRCA Large Indoor Rodeo of the Year
- 2011 PRCA Large Indoor Rodeo of the Year
- 2012 PRCA Large Indoor Rodeo of the Year
- 2013 PRCA Large Indoor Rodeo of the Year
- 2014 PRCA Large Indoor Rodeo of the Year
- 2015 PRCA Large Indoor Rodeo of the Year
- 2016 PRCA Large Indoor Rodeo of the Year
- 2017 PRCA Large Indoor Rodeo of the Year
- 2018 PRCA Large Indoor Rodeo of the Year

== See also ==
- Professional Rodeo Cowboys Association
- Women's Professional Cowboy Association
- FFA
- 4-H
