= Championship Bull Riding =

American bull riding organization

- Sport: Bull riding
- Founded: 2002
- Country: United States
- Most recent champion: (United States) Cody Jesus
- Website: CBRbull.com

Championship Bull Riding, Inc. (CBR) was a professional bull riding organization based in Weatherford, Texas, United States.

== History ==
Stock contractor Terry Williams and Texas businessman Joel Logan founded Championship Bull Riding (CBR) in Carthage, Texas, in 2002. ProRodeo Hall of Fame cowboy and four-time world champion bull rider Tuff Hedeman was an integral part of the live event production and an ambassador for the organization from 2011 to 2018 after serving as president from 2005 to 2011. In early 2018, Hedeman left CBR to start his own organization: the Tuff Hedeman Bull Riding Tour.

Many bull riders who competed in CBR were also regulars on the Professional Rodeo Cowboys Association (PRCA) circuit, competing in its complete rodeos and bull riding-only Xtreme Bulls tour.

From 2002 through 2007, CBR was televised on the Outdoor Channel; in 2008 on RFD-TV; from 2009 through 2011 on Great American Country; and from 2012 through 2017 was broadcast on Fox Sports Networks.

The CBR World Finals event was held in different locations of the United States throughout the years. From 2002 through 2004, it was held in Kansas City, Missouri; in 2005 in Jackson, Mississippi; from 2006 through 2008 in Las Vegas, Nevada; in 2009 and 2010 again in Kansas City, Missouri, now in conjunction with the American Royal; in 2011 in Loveland, Colorado; and from 2012 through 2018 in Cheyenne, Wyoming, at Cheyenne Frontier Days, held in conjunction with the annual PRCA rodeo there.

From 2009 through 2018, CBR awarded its annual World Champion a $100,000 bonus, and from 2013 through 2017, the winning rider of the World Finals event was awarded $50,000.

In the summer of 2009, CBR launched the Million Dollar Bull Team Challenge. In these events, teams of 10 stock contractors with three bulls per team competed against each other at selected CBR events by showcasing their bulls against riders for large payout purses and accumulated points towards the year-end Bull Team Challenge championship. The Million Dollar Bull Team Challenge was first held by the Professional Bull Riders (PBR) at certain Built Ford Tough Series (BFTS) events in 2008. However, it was discontinued by said organization after that one year, before being picked up by CBR the following year. Also in the summer of 2009, CBR launched a series of residency events at Cowtown Coliseum in the Historic Stockyards in Fort Worth, Texas, known as the Horizon Series, in which up-and-coming riders competed to try and work their way up to the elite, televised tour.

The Horizon Series became a traveling tour beginning with the 2010 CBR season. In the summer of that year, the Horizon Series expanded to include 52 events at Cowtown Coliseum, as well as events at Billy Bob's Texas, also in the Fort Worth Stockyards. Also in 2010, Cinch Jeans became the title sponsor of the televised CBR tour, thus becoming the Cinch CBR Tour.

In 2013, the Cinch CBR Tour was renamed the Road to Cheyenne Tour.

CBR's Road to Cheyenne Tour and its subsidiary Horizon Series visited over 70 venues annually across the United States.

From 2013 to 2018, CBR's televised Road to Cheyenne Tour was conducted in the proprietary 8 Second Challenge format. 24 riders would compete in the first round, and those who made a successful eight-second ride got paid $500. The top 12 riders based on scores returned to the second round, and those who made a successful eight-second ride got paid $750. The top four riders in the second round would move on to the third and final round and each rider, regardless if they made a successful eight-second ride or not, got paid $1,000. If the event leader rode his bull in the championship round and ended up scoring the most points, he received up to a $20,000 bonus. However, in the middle of the 2018 season, due to many requests from contestants, CBR's Road to Cheyenne Tour returned to a previous competition format where 35 riders would compete in a regular season event for a purse of $30,000. All 35 riders would compete in the long round and the top 15 based on scores would compete in the championship round. The winner of the event would get paid a minimum of $10,000. When the regular season ended, the top 35 riders in the world standings (combining Road to Cheyenne Tour and Horizon Series points) would qualify for the CBR World Finals. The rider who won the most points throughout the regular season and World Finals was crowned the CBR World Champion.

The 2018 Road to Cheyenne Tour regular-season events were not televised and CBR went out of business after that year's World Finals. The World Finals itself was produced by the PBR and live-streamed on their paywall-subscription-based video-on-demand service, RidePass (which became a free, ad-supported channel on Pluto TV in July 2021).

When Tuff Hedeman left CBR in early 2018, some of the organization's annual events had broken off and joined Hedeman's new tour. After CBR's collapse later that summer, the Million Dollar Bull Team Challenge became re-affiliated with the PBR and its events now take place within PBR Velocity Tour stops. The bull-riding events at Cowtown Coliseum that were previously sanctioned by CBR are now also sanctioned by the PBR. Other annual events that were previously sanctioned by CBR also joined the PBR, some the Tuff Hedeman Bull Riding Tour, and others the PRCA Xtreme Bulls Tour.

== CBR World Champions ==
- 2002 (United States) Mike White
- 2003 (United States) Ross Johnson
- 2004 (United States) Austin Meier
- 2005 (United States) Matt Austin
- 2006 (United States) Matt Austin
- 2007 (United States) Bonner Bolton
- 2008 (United States) Clayton Baethge
- 2009 (Mexico) Hugo Pedrero
- 2010 (United States) Luke Kelley
- 2011 (United States) Clayton Foltyn
- 2012 (United States) Josh Barentine
- 2013 (United States) Cole Echols
- 2014 (United States) Sage Kimzey
- 2015 (United States) Cody Teel
- 2016 (United States) Sage Kimzey
- 2017 (United States) Sage Kimzey
- 2018 (United States) Cody Jesus

== World Finals Event Champions ==
- 2005 (United States) Matt Austin
- 2006 (United States) Kolt Miller
- 2007 (United States) Bonner Bolton
- 2008 (United States) Clayton Baethge
- 2009 (United States) J.W. Harris
- 2010 (United States) Steve Woolsey
- 2011 (United States) Chase Outlaw
- 2012 (United States) Wesley Silcox
- 2013 (United States) Wesley Silcox
- 2014 (United States) Neil Holmes
- 2015 (United States) Brennon Eldred
- 2016 (United States) Sage Kimzey
- 2017 (United States) Cody Jesus

== Horizon Series Champions ==
- 2010 (United States) Luke Kelley
- 2011 (United States) Cody White
- 2012 (United States) Josh Barentine
- 2013 (United States) Tyler Adrian
- 2014 (United States) Kritter Lamb
- 2015 (United States) Cody Rostockyj
- 2016 (United States) Koby Radley
- 2017 (United States) John Pitts
- 2018 (United States) Braden Richardson

== Bull of the Year ==
- 2005 - Spiderman
- 2006 - Biloxi Blues
- 2007 - Zorro
- 2008 - Cochise
- 2009 - Texas Cocktail
- 2010 - Double Scoop
- 2011 - Double Scoop
- 2012 - Bugle
- 2013 - Got It
- 2014 - Penny Lover
- 2015 - Corpus Red (tie)
- 2015 - Gold Buckle (tie)
- 2016 - Cowtown Cartel
- 2017 - Hy Test
- 2018 - Dirty Little Secret

== Stock Contractor of the Year ==
- 2003 - Terry Williams
- 2004 - Chuck Griffith
- 2005 - Harlan Robertson
- 2006 - Harlan Robertson
- 2007 - Harlan Robertson
- 2008 - Alan Murphy
- 2009 - Scott Burruss
- 2010 - Brad Vogele
- 2011 - Danny Reagan
- 2012 - Billy Jones
- 2013 - Mike Rawson
- 2014 - Jeff Harris
- 2015 - Mike Rawson
- 2016 - Mike Rawson
- 2017 - Mike Rawson
- 2018 - Jeff Harris

== Bull Team Challenge Champions ==
- 2010 - Scott Burrus / Wild Card Rodeo Co.
- 2011 - The Washburn Company
- 2012 - The Jaynes Gang / Exclusive Genetics / Team Bays
- 2013 - B&M Bucking Bulls
- 2014 - Cude Energy
- 2015 - Rawson / Probst
- 2016 - Harris Bucking Bulls
- 2017 - Williams / Freeman / Pepper
- 2018 - Jerilyn Harmon's Elite Bulls

== See also ==
- Lists of rodeo performers
- Bull Riding Hall of Fame
- Professional Bull Riders
- Professional Rodeo Cowboys Association
- ProRodeo Hall of Fame
- American Bucking Bull
- International Professional Rodeo Association
- Women's Professional Rodeo Association
- Canadian Professional Rodeo Association
- Bull Riders Only
