= NFR Open =

American rodeo

The NFR Open is an annual championship rodeo event of the Professional Rodeo Cowboys Association (PRCA) held annually in the United States. The event was previously known as the National Circuit Finals Rodeo (NCFR) from 1987 through 2021, before being renamed as the NFR Open in 2022. Qualification for the event comes via winning the season title or winning the average title at the regional circuit finals rodeos in bareback riding, steer wrestling, team roping, saddle bronc riding, tie-down roping, barrel racing, breakaway roping and bull riding. To qualify, a competitor must compete in one of the 12 PRCA U.S. regional circuits; Montana, Mountain States, Wilderness, Columbia River, California, Turquoise, Texas, Prairie, Badlands, Great Lakes, Southeast, and First Frontier.

At the NFR Open, competitors go through two longer performances to compete for eight spots in the semi-finals. The semis and the finals are in sudden death format. The top four times and scores will advance to the one go-round final. Whoever has the top score or time in the finals is individually crowned the PRCA U.S. National Champion for the year in each event. Each different circuit also competes at the NFR Open as a team and the best performing circuit wins the PRCA National Circuit Team Championship.

From 1987 through 2010, the NCFR was held every spring in Pocatello, Idaho. Then from 2011 through 2013, the event took place in Oklahoma City, Oklahoma. The event moved to Guthrie, Oklahoma, in 2014. In 2015, the NCFR moved to Kissimmee, Florida. In 2020, due to the COVID-19 pandemic, the NCFR was rescheduled and moved to the Stampede Arena from September 10 through 13 in Greeley, Colorado. This event was closed to the public. In 2021, the NCFR returned to Kissimmee, Florida, and was held during its normal run in the springtime, but consisted of a limited and socially distanced crowd due to the ongoing pandemic.

Since 2016, the PRCA has had a partnership with the Federación Mexicana de Rodeo (FMR) (Mexican Rodeo Federation). Rodeo contestants compete in a series of events co-sectioned by the PRCA and FMR called the PRCA-FMR Tour. It has a year-end finals event and the tour champions and finals champions from the previous calendar year competed at the NCFR beginning in 2017. This lasted through 2020, until the COVID-19 pandemic forced the PRCA's partnership with the FMR to pause for three years. Since 2023, the PRCA-FMR Tour champions again compete at the NFR Open. The season champions of the Maple Leaf Circuit, which was forged between a partnership with the PRCA and Canadian Professional Rodeo Association (CPRA), first competed at the NCFR in 2020 and have consistently competed annually at the NFR Open since then.

In 2022, the National Circuit Finals Rodeo was renamed as the NFR Open and now takes place every July at the Pikes Peak or Bust Rodeo in Colorado Springs, Colorado. In 2024, the PRCA and Pikes Peak or Bust Rodeo signed a seven-year contract extension to keep the NFR open in Colorado Springs.

In 2008, the ProRodeo Hall of Fame in Colorado Springs, Colorado, inducted the National Circuit Finals Rodeo in the Rodeo Committees category.
