= List of Professional Rodeo Cowboys Association Champions =

This List of Professional Rodeo Cowboys Association Champions contains champions and awards in the sport of professional rodeo. The Professional Rodeo Cowboys Association (PRCA) is the oldest and largest professional rodeo organization in the United States that sanctions men's events. The PRCA is based in Colorado Springs, Colorado. This article lists all of the major champions from each of the events held yearly at the National Finals Rodeo (NFR), National Finals Steer Roping (NFSR), and National Breakaway Finals (NBF). Barrel racing and breakaway roping are sanctioned by the Women's Professional Rodeo Association (WPRA). It also lists the all-around champion, awarded to the competitor who wins the most prize money in a year competing in at least two events. The bucking livestock from the three roughstock events are also awarded championships titled stock of the year. Also listed are the winners of various awards given during the NFR, such as the timed-event awards for AQHA/PRCA Horse of the Year and the Top NFR Bucking Stock. The PRCA also runs the ProRodeo Hall of Fame which inducts new members annually.

The world championships awarded by this organization are the highest rodeo honors given in the rodeo profession. The PRCA also inducts notable people and livestock into its Hall of Fame.

== Professional Rodeo Cowboys Association ==
The Professional Rodeo Cowboys Association, Women's Professional Rodeo Association, National Finals Rodeo, National Finals Steer Roping, and National Finals Breakaway Roping have their histories tracked in separate articles.

== PRCA World Champions ==
=== All-Around Champions ===
- 2025 Stetson Wright, Beaver, Utah
- 2024 Shad Mayfield, Clovis, New Mexico
- 2023 Stetson Wright, Milford, Utah
- 2022 Stetson Wright, Milford, Utah
- 2021 Stetson Wright, Milford, Utah
- 2020 Stetson Wright, Milford, Utah,
- 2019 Stetson Wright, Milford, Utah
- 2018 Trevor Brazile, Decatur, Texas
- 2017 Tuf Cooper, Decatur, Texas
- 2016 Junior Nogueira, Presidente Prudente, São Paulo, Brazil
- 2015 Trevor Brazile, Decatur, Texas
- 2014 Trevor Brazile, Decatur, Texas
- 2013 Trevor Brazile, Decatur, Texas
- 2012 Trevor Brazile, Decatur, Texas
- 2011 Trevor Brazile, Decatur, Texas
- 2010 Trevor Brazile, Decatur, Texas
- 2009 Trevor Brazile, Decatur, Texas
- 2008 Trevor Brazile, Decatur, Texas
- 2007 Trevor Brazile, Decatur, Texas
- 2006 Trevor Brazile, Decatur, Texas
- 2005 Ryan Jarrett, Summerville, Georgia
- 2004 Trevor Brazile, Decatur, Texas
- 2003 Trevor Brazile, Decatur, Texas
- 2002 Trevor Brazile, Anson, Texas
- 2001 Cody Ohl, Stephenville, Texas
- 2000 Joe Beaver, Huntsville, Texas
- 1999 Fred Whitfield, Hockley, Texas
- 1998 Ty Murray, Stephenville, Texas
- 1997 Dan Mortensen, Manhattan, Montana
- 1996 Joe Beaver, Huntsville, Texas
- 1995 Joe Beaver, Huntsville, Texas
- 1994 Ty Murray, Stephenville, Texas
- 1993 Ty Murray, Stephenville, Texas
- 1992 Ty Murray, Stephenville, Texas
- 1991 Ty Murray, Stephenville, Texas
- 1990 Ty Murray, Stephenville, Texas
- 1989 Ty Murray, Odessa, Texas
- 1988 Dave Appleton, Arlington, Texas
- 1987 Lewis Feild, Elk Ridge, Utah
- 1986 Lewis Feild, Elk Ridge, Utah
- 1985 Lewis Feild, Elk Ridge, Utah
- 1984 Dee Pickett, Caldwell, Idaho
- 1983 Roy Cooper, Durant, Oklahoma
- 1982 Chris Lybbert, Coyote, California
- 1981 Jimmie Cooper, Monument, New Mexico
- 1980 Paul Tierney, Rapid City, South Dakota
- 1979 Tom Ferguson, Miami, Oklahoma
- 1978 Tom Ferguson, Miami, Oklahoma
- 1977 Tom Ferguson, Miami, Oklahoma
- 1976 Tom Ferguson, Miami, Oklahoma
- 1975 Leo Camarillo, Oakdale, California (tie)
- 1975 Tom Ferguson, Miami, Oklahoma (tie)
- 1974 Tom Ferguson, Miami, Oklahoma
- 1973 Larry Mahan, Dallas, Texas
- 1972 Phil Lyne, George West, Texas
- 1971 Phil Lyne, George West, Texas
- 1970 Larry Mahan, Brooks, Oregon
- 1969 Larry Mahan, Salem, Oregon
- 1968 Larry Mahan, Salem, Oregon
- 1967 Larry Mahan, Brooks, Oregon
- 1966 Larry Mahan, Brooks, Oregon
- 1965 Dean Oliver, Boise, Idaho
- 1964 Dean Oliver, Boise, Idaho
- 1963 Dean Oliver, Boise, Idaho
- 1962 Tom Nesmith, Bethel, Oklahoma
- 1961 Benny Reynolds, Melrose, Montana
- 1960 Harry Tompkins, Dublin, Texas
- 1959 Jim Shoulders, Henryetta, Oklahoma
- 1958 Jim Shoulders, Henryetta, Oklahoma
- 1957 Jim Shoulders, Henryetta, Oklahoma
- 1956 Jim Shoulders, Henryetta, Oklahoma
- 1955 Casey Tibbs, Fort Pierre, South Dakota
- 1954 Buck Rutherford, Lenapah, Oklahoma
- 1953 Bill Linderman, Red Lodge, Montana
- 1952 Harry Tompkins, Dublin, Texas
- 1951 Casey Tibbs, Fort Pierre, South Dakota
- 1950 Bill Linderman, Red Lodge, Montana
- 1949 Jim Shoulders, Henryetta, Oklahoma
- 1948 Gerald Roberts, Strong City, Kansas
- 1947 Todd Whatley, Hugo, Oklahoma
- 1946 No All-Around Champion this year
- 1945 No All-Around Champion this year
- 1944 Louis Brooks, Pittsburg, Kansas
- 1943 Louis Brooks, Pittsburg, Kansas
- 1942 Gerald Roberts, Strong City, Kansas
- 1941 Homer Pettigrew, Grady, New Mexico
- 1940 Firtz Truan, Long Beach, California
- 1939 Paul Carney, Galeton, Colorado
- 1938 Burel Mulkey, Salmon, Idaho
- 1937 Everett Bowman, Hillside, Arizona
- 1936 John Bowman, Oakdale, California
- 1935 Everett Bowman, Hillside, Arizona
- 1934 Leonard Ward, Talent, Oregon
- 1933 Clay Carr, Visalia, California
- 1932 Donald Nesbit, Snowflake, Arizona
- 1931 Johnie Schneider, Livermore, California
- 1930 Clay Carr, Visalia, California
- 1929 Earl Thode, Belvidere, South Dakota

=== Bareback Riding Champions ===
- 2025 Rocker Steiner, Weatherford, Texas
- 2024 Dean Thompson, Altamont, Utah
- 2023 Keenan Hayes, Hayden, Colorado
- 2022 Jess Pope, Waverly, Kansas
- 2021 Kaycee Feild, Genola, Utah
- 2020 Kaycee Feild, Genola, Utah
- 2019 Clayton Biglow, Clements, California
- 2018 Tim O'Connell, Zwingle, Iowa
- 2017 Tim O'Connell, Zwingle, Iowa
- 2016 Tim O'Connell, Zwingle, Iowa
- 2015 Steven Peebles, Redmond, Oregon
- 2014 Kaycee Feild, Spanish Fork, Utah
- 2013 Kaycee Feild, Spanish Fork, Utah
- 2012 Kaycee Feild, Spanish Fork, Utah
- 2011 Kaycee Feild, Payson, Utah
- 2010 Bobby Mote, Culver, Oregon
- 2009 Bobby Mote, Culver, Oregon
- 2008 Justin McDaniel, Porum, Oklahoma
- 2007 Bobby Mote, Culver, Oregon
- 2006 Will Lowe, Canyon, Texas
- 2005 Will Lowe, Canyon, Texas
- 2004 Kelly Timberman, Mills, Wyoming
- 2003 Will Lowe, Canyon, Texas
- 2002 Bobby Mote, Redmond, Oregon
- 2001 Lan LaJeunesse, Morgan, Utah
- 2000 Jeffrey Collins, Redfield, Kansas
- 1999 Lan LaJeunesse, Morgan, Utah
- 1998 Mark Gomes, Hutchinson, Kansas
- 1997 Eric Mouton, Weatherford, Oklahoma
- 1996 Mark Garrett, Spearfish, South Dakota
- 1995 Marvin Garrett, Belle Fourche, South Dakota
- 1994 Marvin Garrett, Belle Fourche, South Dakota
- 1993 Deb Greenough, Red Lodge, Montana
- 1992 Wayne Herman, Dickinson, North Dakota
- 1991 Cint Corey, Kennewick, Washington
- 1990 Chuck Logue, Decatur, Texas
- 1989 Marvin Garrett, Belle Fourche, South Dakota
- 1988 Marvin Garrett, Gillette, Wyoming
- 1987 Bruce Ford, Kersey, Colorado
- 1986 Lewis Feild, Elk Ridge, Utah
- 1985 Lewis Feild, Elk Ridge, Utah
- 1984 Larry Peabody, Three Forks, Montana
- 1983 Bruce Ford, Kersey, Colorado
- 1982 Bruce Ford, Kersey, Colorado
- 1981 J.C. Trujillo, Steamboat Springs, Colorado
- 1980 Bruce Ford, Kersey, Colorado
- 1979 Bruce Ford, Evans, Colorado
- 1978 Jack Ward Jr., Springdale, Arkansas
- 1977 Jack Ward Jr., Springdale, Arkansas
- 1976 Chris LeDoux, Kaycee, Wyoming
- 1975 Joe Alexander, Cora, Wyoming
- 1974 Joe Alexander, Cora, Wyoming
- 1973 Joe Alexander, Cora, Wyoming
- 1972 Joe Alexander, Cora, Wyoming
- 1971 Joe Alexander, Cora, Wyoming
- 1970 Paul Mayo, Fort Worth, Texas
- 1969 Gary Tucker, Carlsbad, New Mexico
- 1968 Clyde Vamvoras, Burkburnett, Texas
- 1967 Clyde Vamvoras, Burkburnett, Texas
- 1966 Paul Mayo, Grinnell, Iowa
- 1965 Jim Houston, Omaha, Nebraska
- 1964 Jim Houston, Omaha, Nebraska
- 1963 John Hawkins, Twain Harte, California
- 1962 Ralph Buell, Sheridan, Wyoming
- 1961 Eddy Akridge, Midland, Texas
- 1960 Jack Buschbom, Cassville, Wisconsin
- 1959 Jack Buschbom, Cassville, Wisconsin
- 1958 Jim Shoulders, Henryetta, Oklahoma
- 1957 Jim Shoulders, Henryetta, Oklahoma
- 1956 Jim Shoulders, Henryetta, Oklahoma
- 1955 Eddy Akridge, Midland, Texas
- 1954 Eddy Akridge, Midland, Texas
- 1953 Eddy Akridge, Midland, Texas
- 1952, Harry Tompkins, Dublin, Texas
- 1951 Casey Tibbs, Fort Pierra, South Dakota
- 1950 Jim Shoulders, Henryetta, Oklahoma
- 1949 Jack Buschbom, Cassville, Wisconsin
- 1948 Sonny Tureman, John Day, Oregon
- 1947 Larry Finley, Phoenix, Arizona
- 1946 Bud Spealman, Fort Worth, Texas
- 1945 Bud Linderman, Red Lodge, Montana
- 1944 Louis Brooks, Pittsburg, Oklahoma
- 1943 Bud Linderman, Red Lodge, Montana
- 1942 Louis Brooks, Pittsburg, Oklahoma
- 1941 George Mills, Montrose, California
- 1940 Carl Dossey, Phoenix, Arizona
- 1939 Paul Carney, Galeton, Colorado
- 1938 Pete Grubb, Salmon, Idaho
- 1937 Paul Carney, Galeton, Colorado
- 1936 Smokey Snyder, Kimberley, British Columbia, Canada
- 1935 Frank Schneider, Caliente, California
- 1934 Leonard Ward, Talent, Oregon
- 1933 Nate Woldum, Strathmore, Alberta, Canada
- 1932 Smokey Snyder, Kimberley, British Columbia, Canada

=== Steer Wrestling Champions ===
- 2025 Tucker Allen, Ventura, California
- 2024 J.D. Struxness, Milan, Minnesota
- 2023 Tyler Waguespack, Gonzales, Louisiana
- 2022 Tyler Waguespack, Gonzales, Louisiana
- 2021 Tyler Waguespack, Gonzales, Louisiana
- 2020 Jacob Edler, State Center, Iowa
- 2019 Ty Erickson, Helena, Montana
- 2018 Tyler Waguespack, Gonzales, Louisiana
- 2017 Tyler Pearson, Louisville, Mississippi
- 2016 Tyler Waguespack, Gonzales, Louisiana
- 2015 Hunter Cure, Holliday, Texas
- 2014 Luke Branquinho, Los Alamos, California
- 2013 Hunter Cure, Holliday, Texas
- 2012 Luke Branquinho, Los Alamos, California
- 2011 Luke Branquinho, Los Alamos, California
- 2010 Dean Gorsuch, Gering, Nebraska
- 2009 Lee Graves, Calgary, Alberta, Canada
- 2008 Luke Branquinho, Los Alamos, California
- 2007 Jason Miller, Lance Creek, Wyoming
- 2006 Dean Gorsuch, Gering, Nebraska
- 2005 Lee Graves, Calgary, Alberta, Canada
- 2004 Luke Branquinho, Los Alamos, California
- 2003 Teddy Johnson, Checotah, Oklahoma
- 2002 Sid Steiner, Bastrop, Texas
- 2001 Rope Myers, Van, Texas
- 2000 Frank Thompson, Cheyenne, Wyoming
- 1999 Mickey Gee, Wichita Falls, Texas
- 1998 Mike Smith, Baton Rouge, Louisiana
- 1997 Brad Gleason, Touchet, Washington
- 1996 Chad Bedell, Jensen, Utah
- 1995 Ote Berry, Checotah, Oklahoma
- 1994 Blaine Pederson, Amisk, Alberta, Canada
- 1993 Steve Duhon, Opelousas, Louisiana
- 1992 Mark Roy, Dalemead, Alberta, Canada
- 1991 Ote Berry, Checotah, Oklahoma
- 1990 Ote Berry, Checotah, Oklahoma
- 1989 John W Jones Jr., Morro Bay, California
- 1988 John W Jones Jr., Morro Bay, California
- 1987 Steve Duhon, Opelousas, Louisiana
- 1986 Steve Duhon, Opelousas, Louisiana
- 1985 Ote Berry, Gordon, Nebraska
- 1984 John W Jones Jr., Morro Bay, California
- 1983 Joel Edmondson, Columbus, Kansas
- 1982 Stan Williamson, Kellyville, Oklahoma
- 1981 Byron Walker, Ennis, Texas
- 1980 Butch Myers, Welda, Kansas
- 1979 Stan Williamson, Kellyville, Oklahoma
- 1978 Tom Ferguson, Miami, Oklahoma
- 1977 Tom Ferguson, Miami, Oklahoma
- 1976 Rick Bradley, Burkburnett, Texas
- 1975 Frank Shepperson, Midwest, Wyoming
- 1974 Tommy Puryear, Norman, Oklahoma
- 1973 Bob Marshall, San Martin, California
- 1972 Roy Duvall, Warner, Oklahoma
- 1971 Bill Hale, Checotah, Oklahoma
- 1970 John W. Jones Sr., Morro Bay, California
- 1969 Roy Duvall, Boynton, Oklahoma
- 1968 Jack Roddy, San Jose, California
- 1967 Roy Duvall, Boynton, Oklahoma
- 1966 Jack Roddy, San Jose, California
- 1965 Harley May, Oakdale, California
- 1964 C.R. Boucher, Burkburnett, Texas
- 1963 Jim Bynum, Waxahachie, Texas
- 1962 Tom Nesmith, Bethel, Oklahoma
- 1961 Jim Bynum, Forreston, Texas
- 1960 Bob A. Robinson, Rockland, Idaho
- 1959 Harry Charters, Melba, Idaho
- 1958 Jim Bynum, Forreston, Texas
- 1957 Willard Combs, Checotah, Oklahoma
- 1956 Harley May, Oakdale, California
- 1955 Benny Combs, Checotah, Oklahoma
- 1954 Jim Bynum, Forreston, Texas
- 1953 Ross Dollarhide, Lakeview, Oregon
- 1952 Harley May, Oakdale, California
- 1951 Dub Phillips, San Angelo, Texas
- 1950 Bill Linderman, Red Lodge, Montana
- 1949 Bill McGuire, Fort Worth, Texas
- 1948 Homer Pettigrew, Grady, New Mexico
- 1947 Todd Whatley, Hugo, Oklahoma
- 1946 Dave Campbell, Las Vegas, Nevada
- 1945 Homer Pettigrew, Grady, New Mexico
- 1944 Homer Pettigrew, Grady, New Mexico
- 1943 Homer Pettigrew, Grady, New Mexico
- 1942 Homer Pettigrew, Grady, New Mexico
- 1941 Hub Whiteman, Clarksville, Texas
- 1940 Homer Pettigrew, Grady, New Mexico
- 1939 Harry Hart, Pocatello, Idaho
- 1938 Everett Bowman, Hillside, Arizona
- 1937 Gene Ross, Sayre, Oklahoma
- 1936 Jack Kerschner, Miles City, Montana
- 1935 Everett Bowman, Hillside, Arizona
- 1934 Shorty Ricker, Ranger, Texas
- 1933 Everett Bowman, Hillside, Arizona
- 1932 Hugh Bennett, Fort Thomas, Arizona
- 1931 Gene Ross, Sayre, Oklahoma
- 1930 Everett Bowman, Hillside, Arizona
- 1929 Gene Ross, Sayre, Oklahoma

=== Team Roping Champions ===
From 1929 to 1994 either the header or the heeler could win the gold buckle. As of 1995 both the best team wins a gold buckle, one for each roper, header and heeler. The buckles now read, "World Champion Header" or "World Champion Heeler."

- 2025 Andrew Ward, Edmond, Oklahoma (header)
- 2025 Jake Long, Coffeyville, Kansas (heeler)
- 2024 Tyler Wade (header), Terrell, Texas
- 2024 Wesley Thorp (heeler), Throckmorton, Texas
- 2023 Tyler Wade (header), Terrell, Texas
- 2023 Wesley Thorp (heeler), Throckmorton, Texas
- 2022 Kaleb Driggers (header), Hoboken, Georgia
- 2022 Junior Noguiera (heeler), Presidente Prudente, São Paulo, Brazil
- 2021 Kaleb Driggers (header), Hoboken, Georgia
- 2021 Junior Noguiera (heeler), Presidente Prudente, São Paulo, Brazil
- 2020 Colby Lovell (header), Madisonville, Texas
- 2020 Paul Eaves (heeler), Lonedell, Missouri
- 2019 Clay Smith (header), Broken Bow, Oklahoma
- 2019 Wesley Thorp (heeler), Throckmorton, Texas
- 2018 Clay Smith (header), Broken Bow, Oklahoma
- 2018 Paul Eaves (heeler), Millsap, Texas
- 2017 Erich Rogers (header), Round Rock, Arizona
- 2017 Cory Petska (heeler), Marana, Arizona
- 2016 Levi Simpson (header), Ponoka, Alberta, Canada
- 2016 Jeremy Buhler (heeler), Arrowwood, Alberta, Canada
- 2015 Aaron Tsinigine (header), Tuba City, Arizona
- 2015 Kollin VonAhn (heeler), Blanchard, Oklahoma
- 2014 Clay Tryan (header), Billings, Montana
- 2014 Jade Corkill (heeler), Fallon, Nevada
- 2013 Clay Tryan (header), Billings, Montana
- 2013 Jade Corkill (heeler), Fallon, Nevada
- 2012 Chad Masters (header), Cedar Hill, Tennessee
- 2012 Jade Corkill (heeler), Fallon, Nevada
- 2011 Turtle Powell (header), Stephenville, Texas
- 2011 Jhett Johnson (heeler), Casper, Wyoming
- 2010 Trevor Brazile (header), Decatur, Texas
- 2010 Patrick Smith (heeler), Midland, Texas
- 2009 Nick Sartain (header), Yukon, Oklahoma
- 2009 Kollin VonAhn (heeler), Durant, Oklahoma
- 2008 Matt Sherwood (header), Pima, Arizona
- 2008 Randon Adams (heeler), Logandale, Nevada
- 2007 Chad Masters (header), Clarksville, Tennessee
- 2007 Walt Woodard (heeler), Stockton, California
- 2006 Matt Sherwood (header), Queen Creek, Arizona
- 2006 Allen Bach (heeler), Weatherford, Texas
- 2005 Clay Tryan (header), Billings, Montana
- 2005 Patrick Smith (healer), Midland, Texas
- 2004 Speed Williams (header), Llano, Texas
- 2004 Rich Skelton (heeler), Llano, Texas
- 2003 Speed Williams (header), Amarillo, Texas
- 2003 Rich Skelton (heeler), Llano, Texas
- 2002 Speed Williams (header), Jacksonville, Florida
- 2002 Rich Skelton (heeler), Llano, Texas
- 2001 Speed Williams (header), Jacksonville, Florida
- 2001 Rich Skelton (heeler), Llano, Texas
- 2000 Speed Williams (header), Jacksonville, Florida
- 2000 Rich Skelton (heeler), Llano, Texas
- 1999 Speed Williams (header), Jacksonville, Florida
- 1999 Rich Skelton (heeler), Llano, Texas
- 1998 Speed Williams (header), Jacksonville, Florida
- 1998 Rich Skelton (heeler), Llano, Texas
- 1997 Speed Williams (header), Jacksonville, Florida
- 1997 Rich Skelton (heeler), Llano, Texas
- 1996 Steve Purcella (header), Hereford, Texas
- 1996 Steve Northcott (heeler), Odessa, Texas
- 1995 Bobby Hurley (header), Ceres, California
- 1995 Allen Bach (heeler), Toltec, Arizona
- 1994 Jake Barnes (header), Cave Creek, Arizona
- 1994 Clay O'Brien Cooper (heeler), Gilbert, Arizona
- 1993 Bobby Hurley, Ceres, California
- 1992 Clay O'Brien Cooper, Gilbert, Arizona
- 1992 Jake Barnes, Higley, Arizona
- 1991 Tee Woolman, Llano, Texas
- 1991 Bob Harris, Gillette, Wyoming
- 1990 Allen Bach, Merced, California
- 1989 Jake Barnes, Bloomfield, New Mexico
- 1989 Clay O'Brien Cooper, Chandler Heights, Arizona
- 1988 Jake Barnes, Bloomfield, New Mexico
- 1988 Clay O'Brien Cooper, Chandler Heights, Arizona
- 1987 Jake Barnes, Bloomfield, New Mexico
- 1987 Clay O'Brien Cooper, Chandler Heights, Arizona
- 1986 Jake Barnes, Bloomfield, New Mexico
- 1986 Clay O'Brien Cooper, Chandler Heights, Arizona
- 1985 Jake Barnes, Bloomfield, New Mexico
- 1985 Clay O'Brien Cooper, Chandler Heights, Arizona
- 1984 Dee Pickett, Caldwell, Idaho
- 1984 Mike Beers, Rufus, Oregon
- 1983 Leo Camarillo, Lockeford, California
- 1982 Tee Woolman, Fredonia, Texas
- 1981 Walt Woodard, Stockton, California
- 1981 Doyle Gellerman, Oakdale, California
- 1980 Tee Woolman, Llano, Texas
- 1979 Allen Bach, Queen Creek, Arizona
- 1978 George Richards, Humboldt, Arizona,
- 1978 Brad Smith, Prescott, Arizona
- 1977 Dennis Motes, Mesa, Arizona
- 1977 David Motes, Fresno, California
- 1976 Ronnie Rasco, Lakeside, California
- 1976 Bucky Bradford, Sylmar, California
- 1975 Leo Camarillo, Oakdale, California
- 1974 H.P. Evetts, Hanford, California
- 1973 Leo Camarillo, Donald, Oregon
- 1972 Leo Camarillo, Donald, Oregon
- 1971 John Miller, Pawhuska, Oklahoma
- 1970 John Miller, Pawhuska, Oklahoma
- 1969 Jerold Camarillo, Oakdale, California
- 1968 Art Arnold, Buckeye, Arizona
- 1967 Joe Glenn, Phoenix, Arizona
- 1966 Ken Luman, Merced, California
- 1965 Jim Rodriguez Jr., Paso Robles, California
- 1964 Bill Hamilton, Phoenix, Arizona
- 1963 Les Hirdes, Turlock, California
- 1962 Jim Rodriguez Jr., Castroville, California
- 1961 Al Hooper, Escalon, California
- 1960 Jim Rodriguez Jr., Castroville, California
- 1959 Jim Rodriguez Jr., Castroville, California
- 1958 Ted Ashworth, Phoenix, Arizona
- 1957 Dale Smith, Chandler, Arizona
- 1956 Dale Smith, Chandler, Arizona
- 1955 Vern Castro, Richmond, California
- 1954 Eddie Schell, Camp Verde, California
- 1953 Ben Johnson, Hollywood, California
- 1952 Asbury Schell, Camp Verde, Arizona
- 1951 Olan Sims, Madera, California
- 1950 Buck Sorrels, Tucson, Arizona
- 1949 Ed Yanez, Newhall, California
- 1948 Joe Glenn, Douglas, Arizona
- 1947 Jim Brister, Lordsburg, New Mexico
- 1946 Chuck Sheppard, Phoenix, Arizona
- 1945 Ernest Gill, Madera, California
- 1944 Murphy Chaney, Shandon, California
- 1943 Mark Hull, Stockton, California
- 1942 Vic Castro, Livermore, California
- 1942 Vern Castro, Livermore, California
- 1941 Jim Hudson, Wilcox, Arizona
- 1940 Pete Grubb, Salmon, Idaho
- 1939 Asbury Schell, Camp Verde, Arizona
- 1938 John Rhodes, Sombrero Butte, Arizona
- 1937 Asbury Schell, Camp Verde, Arizona
- 1936 John Rhodes, Sombrero Butte, Arizona
- 1935 Lawrence Conley, Prescott, Arizona
- 1934, Andy Jauregui, Newhall, California
- 1933 Roy Adams, Tucson, Arizona
- 1932 Ace Gardner, Coolidge, Arizona
- 1931 Arthur Beloat, Buckeye, Arizona
- 1930 Norman Cowan, Gresham, Oregon
- 1929 Charles Maggini, San Jose, California

=== Saddle Bronc Riding Champions ===
- 2025 Statler Wright, Beaver, Utah
- 2024 Ryder Wright, Beaver, Utah
- 2023 Zeke Thurston, Big Valley, Alberta, Canada
- 2022 Zeke Thurston, Big Valley, Alberta, Canada
- 2021 Stetson Wright, Milford, Utah
- 2020 Ryder Wright, Milford, Utah
- 2019 Zeke Thurston, Big Valley, Alberta, Canada
- 2018 Wade Sundell, Boxholm, Iowa
- 2017 Ryder Wright, Beaver, Utah
- 2016 Zeke Thurston, Big Valley, Alberta, Canada
- 2015 Jacobs Crawley, Boerne, Texas
- 2014 Spencer Wright, Milford, Utah
- 2013 Chad Ferley, Oelrichs, South Dakota
- 2012 Jesse Wright, Milford, Utah
- 2011 Taos Muncy, Corona, New Mexico
- 2010 Cody Wright, Milford, Utah
- 2009 Jesse Kruse, Great Falls, Montana
- 2008 Cody Wright, Milford, Utah
- 2007 Taos Muncy, Corona, New Mexico
- 2006 Chad Ferley, Oelrichs, South Dakota
- 2005 Jeff Willert, Belvidere, South Dakota
- 2004 Billy Etbauer, Edmond, Oklahoma
- 2003 Dan Mortensen, Billings, Montana
- 2002 Glen O'Neill, Didsbury, Alberta, Canada
- 2001 Tom Reeves, Eagle Butte, South Dakota
- 2000 Billy Etbauer, Edmond, Oklahoma
- 1999 Billy Etbauer, Ree Heights, South Dakota
- 1998 Dan Mortensen, Manhattan, Montana
- 1997 Dan Mortensen, Manhattan, Montana
- 1996 Billy Etbauer, Ree Heights, South Dakota
- 1995 Dan Mortensen, Manhattan, Montana
- 1994 Dan Mortensen, Manhattan, Montana
- 1993 Dan Mortensen, Manhattan, Montana
- 1992 Billy Etbauer, Ree Heights, South Dakota
- 1991 Robert Etbauer, Goodwell, Oklahoma
- 1990 Robert Etbauer, Ree Heights, South Dakota
- 1989 Clint Johnson, Spearfish, South Dakota
- 1988 Clint Johnson, Spearfish, South Dakota
- 1987 Clint Johnson, Spearfish, South Dakota
- 1986 Bud Munroe, Valley Mills, Texas
- 1985 Brad Gjermundson, Marshall, North Dakota
- 1984 Brad Gjermundson, Marshall, North Dakota
- 1983 Brad Gjermundson, Marshall, North Dakota
- 1982 Monty Henson, Mesquite, Texas
- 1981 Brad Gjermundson, Marshall, North Dakota
- 1980 Clint Johnson, Spearfish, South Dakota
- 1979 Bobby Berger, Lexington, Oklahoma
- 1978 Joe Marvel, Battle Mountain, Nevada
- 1977 J.C. Bonine, Hysham, Montana
- 1976 Monty Henson, Mesquite, Texas (tie)
- 1976 Mel Hyland, Salmon Arm, British Columbia, Canada (tie)
- 1975 Monty Henson, Mesquite, Texas
- 1974 John McBeth, Burden, Kansas
- 1973 Bill Smith, Cody, Wyoming
- 1972 Mel Hyland, Surrey, British Columbia, Canada
- 1971 Bill Smith, Cody, Wyoming
- 1970 Dennis Reiners, Scottsdale, Arizona
- 1969 Bill Smith, Cody, Wyoming
- 1968 Shawn Davis, Whitehall, Montana
- 1967 Shawn Davis, Whitehall, Montana
- 1966 Marty Wood, Bowness, Alberta, Canada
- 1965 Shawn Davis, Whitehall, Montana
- 1964 Marty Wood, Bowness, Alberta, Canada
- 1963 Guy Weeks, Abilene, Texas
- 1962 Kenny McLean, Okanagan Falls, British Columbia, Canada
- 1961 Winston Bruce, Calgary, Alberta, Canada
- 1960 Enoch Walker, Cody, Wyoming
- 1959 Casey Tibbs, Fort Pierre, South Dakota
- 1958 Marty Wood, Bowness, Alberta, Canada
- 1957 Alvin Nelson, Sentinel Butte, North Dakota
- 1956 Deb Copenhaver, Post Falls, Idaho
- 1955 Deb Copenhaver, Post Falls, Idaho
- 1954 Casey Tibbs, Fort Pierre, South Dakota
- 1953 Casey Tibbs, Fort Pierre, South Dakota
- 1952 Casey Tibbs, Fort Pierre, South Dakota
- 1951 Casey Tibbs, Fort Pierre, South Dakota
- 1950 Bill Linderman, Red Lodge, Montana
- 1949 Casey Tibbs, Fort Pierre, South Dakota
- 1948 Gene Pruett, Tieton, Washington
- 1947 Carl Olson, Calgary, Alberta, Canada
- 1946 Jerry Ambler, Glenwood, Washington
- 1945 Bill Linderman, Red Lodge, Montana
- 1944 Louis Brooks, Pittsburg, Oklahoma
- 1943 Louis Brooks, Pittsburg, Oklahoma
- 1942 Doff Aber, Wolf, Wyoming
- 1941 Doff Aber, Wolf, Wyoming
- 1940 Fitz Truan, Long Beach, California
- 1939 Fitz Truan, Long Beach, California
- 1938 Burel Mulkey, Salmon, Idaho
- 1937 Burel Mulkey, Salmon, Idaho
- 1936 Pete Knight, Crossfield, Alberta, Canada
- 1935 Pete Knight, Crossfield, Alberta, Canada
- 1934 Leonard Ward, Talent, Oregon
- 1933 Pete Knight, Crossfield, Alberta, Canada
- 1932 Pete Knight, Crossfield, Alberta, Canada
- 1931 Earl Thode, Belvidere, South Dakota
- 1930 Clay Carr, Visalia, California
- 1929 Earl Thode, Belvidere, South Dakota

=== Tie-Down Roping Champions ===
- 2025 Riley Webb, Denton, Texas
- 2024 Riley Webb, Denton, Texas
- 2023 Riley Webb, Denton, Texas
- 2022 Caleb Smidt, Huntsville, Texas
- 2021 Caleb Smidt, Huntsville, Texas
- 2020 Shad Mayfield, Clovis, New Mexico
- 2019 Haven Meged, Miles City, Montana
- 2018 Caleb Smidt, Huntsville, Texas
- 2017 Marcos Costa, Childress, Texas
- 2016 Tyson Durfey, Weatherford, Texas
- 2015 Caleb Smidt, Bellville, Texas
- 2014 Tuf Cooper, Decatur, Texas
- 2013 Shane Hanchey, Sulphur, Louisiana
- 2012 Tuf Cooper, Decatur, Texas
- 2011 Tuf Cooper, Decatur, Texas
- 2010 Trevor Brazile, Decatur, Texas
- 2009 Trevor Brazile, Decatur, Texas
- 2008 Stran Smith, Childress, Texas
- 2007 Trevor Brazile, Decatur, Texas
- 2006 Cody Ohl, Hico, Texas
- 2005 Fred Whitfield, Hockley, Texas
- 2004 Monty Lewis, Hereford, Texas
- 2003 Cody Ohl, Stephenville, Texas
- 2002 Fred Whitfield, Hockley, Texas
- 2001 Cody Ohl, Stephenville, Texas
- 2000 Fred Whitfield, Hockley, Texas
- 1999 Fred Whitfield, Hockley, Texas
- 1998 Cody Ohl, Orchard, Texas
- 1997 Cody Ohl, Orchard, Texas
- 1996 Fred Whitfield, Hockley, Texas
- 1995 Fred Whitfield, Hockley, Texas
- 1994 Herbert Theriot, Wiggins, Mississippi
- 1993 Joe Beaver, Huntsville, Texas
- 1992 Joe Beaver, Huntsville, Texas
- 1991 Fred Whitfield, Cypress, Texas
- 1990 Troy Pruitt, Lennox, South Dakota
- 1989 Rabe Rabon, San Antonio, Florida
- 1988 Joe Beaver, Victoria, Texas
- 1987 Joe Beaver, Victoria, Texas
- 1986 Chris Lybbert, Argyle, Texas
- 1985 Joe Beaver, Victoria, Texas
- 1984 Roy Cooper, Durant, Oklahoma
- 1983 Roy Cooper, Durant, Oklahoma
- 1982 Roy Cooper, Durant, Oklahoma
- 1981 Roy Cooper, Durant, Oklahoma
- 1980 Roy Cooper, Durant, Oklahoma
- 1979 Paul Tierney, Rapid City, South Dakota
- 1978 Dave Brock, Pueblo, Colorado
- 1977 Jim Glastone, Cardston, Alberta, Canada
- 1976 Roy Cooper, Durant, Oklahoma
- 1975 Jeff Copenhaver, Spokane, Washington
- 1974 Tom Ferguson, Miami, Oklahoma
- 1973 Ernie Taylor, Hugo, Oklahoma
- 1972 Phil Lyne, George West, Texas
- 1971 Phil Lyne, George West, Texas
- 1970 Junior Garrison, Duncan, Oklahoma
- 1969 Dean Oliver, Boise, Idaho
- 1968 Glen Franklin, House, New Mexico
- 1967 Glen Franklin, House, New Mexico
- 1966 Junior Garrison, Marlow, Oklahoma
- 1965 Glen Franklin, House, New Mexico
- 1964 Dean Oliver, Boise, Idaho
- 1963 Dean Oliver, Boise, Idaho
- 1962 Dean Oliver, Boise, Idaho
- 1961 Dean Oliver, Boise, Idaho
- 1960 Dean Oliver, Boise, Idaho
- 1959 Jim Bob Altizer, Del Rio, Texas
- 1958 Dean Oliver, Boise, Idaho
- 1957 Don McLaughlin, Fort Worth, Texas
- 1956 Ray Wharton, Bandera, Texas
- 1955 Dean Oliver, Boise, Idaho
- 1954 Don McLaughlin, Fort Worth, Texas
- 1953 Don McLaughlin, Fort Worth, Texas
- 1952 Don McLaughlin, Fort Worth, Texas
- 1951 Don McLaughlin, Fort Worth, Texas
- 1950 Toots Mansfield, Bandera, Texas
- 1949 Troy Fort, Lovington, New Mexico
- 1948 Toots Mansfield, Bandera, Texas
- 1947 Troy Fort, Lovington, New Mexico
- 1946 Royce Sewalt, King, Texas
- 1945 Toots Mansfield, Bandera, Texas
- 1944 Clyde Burk, Comanche, Oklahoma
- 1943 Toots Mansfield, Bandera, Texas
- 1942 Clyde Burk, Comanche, Oklahoma
- 1941 Toots Mansfield, Bandera, Texas
- 1940 Toots Mansfield, Bandera, Texas
- 1939 Toots Mansfield, Bandera, Texas
- 1938 Clyde Burk, Comanche, Oklahoma
- 1937 Everett Bowman, Hillside, Arizona
- 1936 Clyde Burk, Comanche, Oklahoma
- 1935 Everett Bowman, Hillside, Arizona
- 1934 Irby Mundy, Shamrock, Texas
- 1933 Bill McFarlane, Red Bluff, California
- 1932, Richard Merchant, Kirkland, Arizona
- 1931 Herb Meyers, Okmulgee, Oklahoma
- 1930 Jake McClure, Lovington, New Mexico
- 1929 Everett Bowman, Hillside, Arizona

=== Bull Riding Champions ===
- 2025 Stetson Wright, Beaver, Utah
- 2024 Josh Frost, Randlett, Utah
- 2023 Ky Hamilton, Mackay, Queensland, Australia
- 2022 Stetson Wright, Milford, Utah
- 2021 Sage Kimzey, Strong City, Oklahoma
- 2020 Stetson Wright, Milford, Utah
- 2019 Sage Kimzey, Strong City, Oklahoma
- 2018 Sage Kimzey, Strong City, Oklahoma
- 2017 Sage Kimzey, Strong City, Oklahoma
- 2016 Sage Kimzey, Strong City, Oklahoma
- 2015 Sage Kimzey, Strong City, Oklahoma
- 2014 Sage Kimzey, Strong City, Oklahoma
- 2013 J.W. Harris, May, Texas
- 2012 Cody Teel, Kountze, Texas
- 2011 Shane Proctor, Grand Coulee, Washington
- 2010 J.W. Harris, May, Texas
- 2009 J.W. Harris, May, Texas
- 2008 J.W. Harris, May, Texas
- 2007 Wesley Silcox, Payson, Utah
- 2006 B.J. Schumacher, Hillsboro, Wisconsin
- 2005 Matt Austin, Wills Point, Texas
- 2004 Dustin Elliot, Tecumseh, Nebraska
- 2003 Terry Don West, Henryetta, Oklahoma
- 2002 Blue Stone, Ogden, Utah
- 2001 Blue Stone, Ogden, Utah
- 2000 Cody Hancock, Taylor, Arizona
- 1999 Mike White, Lake Charles, Louisiana
- 1998 Ty Murray, Stephenville, Texas
- 1997 Scott Mendes, Weatherford, Texas
- 1996 Terry Don West, Henryetta, Oklahoma
- 1995 Jerome Davis, Archdale, North Carolina
- 1994 Daryl Mills, Pink Mountain, British Columbia, Canada
- 1993 Ty Murray, Stephenville, Texas
- 1992 Cody Custer, Wickenburg, Arizona
- 1991 Tuff Hedeman, Bowie, Texas
- 1990 Jim Sharp, Kermit, Texas
- 1989 Tuff Hedeman, Bowie, Texas
- 1988 Jim Sharp, Kermit, Texas
- 1987 Lane Frost, Lane, Oklahoma
- 1986 Tuff Hedeman, Gainesville, Texas
- 1985 Ted Nuce, Manteca, California
- 1984 Don Gay, Mesquite, Texas
- 1983 Cody Snyder, Redcliff, Alberta, Canada
- 1982 Charlie Sampson, Los Angeles, California
- 1981 Don Gay, Mesquite, Texas
- 1980 Don Gay, Mesquite, Texas
- 1979 Don Gay, Mesquite, Texas
- 1978 Butch Kirby, Alba, Texas
- 1977 Don Gay, Mesquite, Texas
- 1976 Don Gay, Mesquite, Texas
- 1975 Don Gay, Mesquite, Texas
- 1974 Don Gay, Mesquite, Texas
- 1973 Bobby Steiner, Austin, Texas
- 1972 John Quintana, Creswell, Oregon
- 1971 Bill Nelson, San Francisco, California
- 1970 Gary Leffew, Santa Maria, California
- 1969 Doug Brown, Silverton, Oregon
- 1968 George Paul, Del Rio, Texas
- 1967 Larry Mahan, Brooks, Oregon
- 1966 Ronnie Rossen, Broadus, Montana
- 1965 Larry Mahan, Brooks, Oregon
- 1964 Bob Wegner, Auburn, Washington
- 1963 Bill Kornell, Palm Springs, California
- 1962 Freckles Brown, Lawton, Oklahoma
- 1961 Ronnie Rossen, Broadus, Montana
- 1960 Harry Tompkins, Dublin, Texas
- 1959 Jim Shoulders, Henryetta, Oklahoma
- 1958 Jim Shoulders, Henryetta, Oklahoma
- 1957 Jim Shoulders, Henryetta, Oklahoma
- 1956 Jim Shoulders, Henryetta, Oklahoma
- 1955 Jim Shoulders, Henryetta, Oklahoma
- 1954 Jim Shoulders, Henryetta, Oklahoma
- 1953 Todd Whatley, Hugo, Oklahoma
- 1952 Harry Tompkins, Dublin, Texas
- 1951 Jim Shoulders, Henryetta, Oklahoma
- 1950 Harry Tompkins, Dublin, Texas
- 1949 Harry Tompkins, Dublin, Texas
- 1948 Harry Tompkins, Dublin, Texas
- 1947 Wag Blesing, Bell, California
- 1946 Pee Wee Morris, Custer, South Dakota
- 1945 Ken Roberts, Strong City, Kansas
- 1944 Ken Roberts, Strong City, Kansas
- 1943 Ken Roberts, Strong City, Kansas
- 1942 Dick Griffith, Fort Worth Texas
- 1941 Dick Griffith, Fort Worth Texas
- 1940 Dick Griffith, Fort Worth Texas
- 1939 Dick Griffith, Fort Worth Texas
- 1938 Kid Fletcher, Hugo, Colorado
- 1937 Smokey Snyder, Kimberley, British Columbia, Canada
- 1936 Smokey Snyder, Kimberley, British Columbia, Canada
- 1935 Smokey Snyder, Kimberley, British Columbia, Canada
- 1934 Frank Schneider, Caliente, California
- 1933 Frank Schneider, Caliente, California
- 1932 (tie) Smokey Snyder, Kimberley, British Columbia, Canada
- 1932 (tie) Johnie Schneider, Livermore, California
- 1931 Smokey Snyder, Kimberley, British Columbia, Canada
- 1930 Johnie Schneider, Livermore, California
- 1929 Johnie Schneider, Livermore, California

=== Steer Roping Champions ===
- 2026 Cole Patterson, Pawnee, Oklahoma
- 2025 Cole Patterson, Pawnee, Oklahoma
- 2024 Cole Patterson, Pawnee, Oklahoma
- 2023 Cole Patterson, Pawnee, Oklahoma
- 2022 J. Tom Fisher, Andrews, Texas
- 2021 Cole Patterson, Pratt, Kansas
- 2020 Trevor Brazile, Decatur, Texas
- 2019 Trevor Brazile, Decatur, Texas
- 2018 Scott Snedecor, Fredericksburg, Texas
- 2017 Scott Snedecor, Fredericksburg, Texas
- 2016 Rocky Patterson, Pratt, Kansas
- 2015 Trevor Brazile, Decatur, Texas
- 2014 Trevor Brazile, Decatur, Texas
- 2013 Trevor Brazile, Decatur, Texas
- 2012 Rocky Patterson, Pratt, Texas
- 2011 Trevor Brazile, Decatur, Texas
- 2010 Rocky Patterson, Pratt, Kansas
- 2009 Rocky Patterson, Pratt, Kansas
- 2008 Scott Snedecor, Uvalde, Texas
- 2007 Trevor Brazile, Decatur, Texas
- 2006 Trevor Brazile, Decatur, Texas
- 2005 Scott Snedecor, Uvalde, Texas
- 2004 Guy Allen, Santa Anna, New Mexico
- 2003 Guy Allen, Santa Anna, New Mexico
- 2002 Buster Record, Buffalo, Oklahoma
- 2001 Guy Allen, Santa Anna, New Mexico
- 2000 Guy Allen, Lovington, New Mexico
- 1999 Guy Allen, Lovington, New Mexico
- 1998 Guy Allen, Lovington, New Mexico
- 1997 Guy Allen, Lovington, New Mexico
- 1996 Guy Allen, Lovington, New Mexico
- 1995 Guy Allen, Lovington, New Mexico
- 1994 Guy Allen, Vinita, Oklahoma
- 1993 Guy Allen, Vinita, Oklahoma
- 1992 Guy Allen, Vinita, Oklahoma
- 1991 Guy Allen, Vinita, Oklahoma
- 1990 Phil Lyne, Cotulla, Texas
- 1989 Guy Allen, Lovington, New Mexico
- 1988 Shaun Burchett, Pryor, Oklahoma
- 1987 Shaun Burchett, Pryor, Oklahoma
- 1986 Jim Davis, Bandera, Texas
- 1985 Jim Davis, Bandera, Texas
- 1984 Guy Allen, Lovington, New Mexico
- 1983 Roy Cooper, Durant, Oklahoma
- 1982 Guy Allen, Lovington, New Mexico
- 1981 Arnold Felts, Mutual, Oklahoma
- 1980 Guy Allen, Santa Anna, New Mexico
- 1979 Gary Good, Elida, New Mexico
- 1978 Kenny Call, Norman, Oklahoma
- 1977 Guy Allen, Santa Anna, Texas
- 1976 Charles Good, Elida, New Mexico
- 1975 Roy Thompson, Tulia, Texas
- 1974 Olin Young, Peralto, New Mexico
- 1973 Roy Thompson, Tulia, Texas
- 1972 Allen Keller, Olathe, Colorado
- 1971 Olin Young, Peralto, New Mexico
- 1970 Don McLaughlin, Fort Collins, Colorado
- 1969 Walter Arnold, Silverton, Texas
- 1968 Sonny Davis, Kenna, New Mexico
- 1967 Jim Bob Altizer, Del Rio, Texas
- 1966 Sonny Davis, Kenna, New Mexico
- 1965 Sonny Wright, Alto, New Mexico
- 1964 Sonny Davis, Kenna, New Mexico
- 1963 Don McLaughlin, Fort Collins, Colorado
- 1962 Everett Shaw, Stonewall, Oklahoma
- 1961 Clark McEntire, Kiowa, Oklahoma
- 1960 Don McLaughlin, Fort Worth, Texas
- 1959 Everett Shaw, Stonewall, Oklahoma
- 1958 Clark McEntire, Kiowa, Oklahoma
- 1957 Clark McEntire, Kiowa, Oklahoma
- 1956 Jim Snively, Pawhuska, Oklahoma
- 1955 Shoat Webster, Lenapah, Oklahoma
- 1954 Shoat Webster, Lenapah, Oklahoma
- 1953 Ike Rude, Buffalo, Oklahoma
- 1952 Buddy Neal, Van Horn, California
- 1951 Everett Shaw, Stonewall, Oklahoma
- 1950 Shoat Webster, Lenapah, Oklahoma
- 1949 Shoat Webster, Lenapah, Oklahoma
- 1948 Everett Shaw, Stonewall, Oklahoma
- 1947 Ike Rude, Buffalo, Oklahoma
- 1946 Everett Shaw, Stonewall, Oklahoma
- 1945 Everett Shaw, Stonewall, Oklahoma
- 1944 Tom Rhodes, Sombrero Butte, Arizona
- 1943 Tom Rhodes, Sombrero Butte, Arizona
- 1942 King Merritt, Federal, Wyoming
- 1941 Ike Rude, Buffalo, Oklahoma
- 1940 Clay Carr, Visalia, California
- 1939 Dick Truitt, Stonewall, Oklahoma
- 1938 Hugh Bennett, Fort Thomas, Arizona
- 1937 Everett Bowman, Hillside, Arizona
- 1936 John Bowman, Oakdale, California
- 1935 Richard Merchant, Kirkland, Arizona
- 1934 John McEntire, Kiowa, Oklahoma
- 1933 John Bowman, Oakdale, California
- 1932 George Weir, Okmulgee, Oklahoma
- 1931 Andy Jauregui, Newhall, California
- 1930 Clay Carr, Visalia, California
- 1929 Charles Maggini, San Jose, California

=== WPRA Barrel Racing Champions ===
- 2025 Kassie Mowry
- 2024 Kassie Mowry
- 2023 Brittany Pozzi Tonozzi
- 2022 Hailey Kinsel
- 2021 Jordon Briggs
- 2020 Hailey Kinsel
- 2019 Hailey Kinsel
- 2018 Hailey Kinsel
- 2017 Nellie Miller
- 2016 Mary Burger
- 2015 Callie duPerier
- 2014 Fallon Taylor
- 2013 Sherry Cervi
- 2012 Mary Walker
- 2011 Lindsay Sears
- 2010 Sherry Cervi
- 2009 Brittany Pozzi
- 2008 Lindsay Sears
- 2007 Kay Blandford (WPRA)
- 2007 Brittany Pozzi (PWBR)
- 2006 Mary Burger
- 2005 Kelly Kaminski
- 2004 Kelly Kaminski
- 2003 Janae Ward
- 2002 Charmayne James
- 2001 Janet Stover
- 2000 Kappy Allen
- 1999 Sherry Cervi
- 1998 Kristie Peterson
- 1997 Kristie Peterson
- 1996 Kristie Peterson
- 1995 Sherry Cervi
- 1994 Kristie Peterson
- 1993 Charmayne James
- 1992 Charmayne James
- 1991 Charmayne James
- 1990 Charmayne James
- 1989 Charmayne James
- 1988 Charmayne James
- 1987 Charmayne James
- 1986 Charmayne James
- 1985 Charmayne James
- 1984 Charmayne James
- 1983 Marlene Eddleman
- 1982 Jan Hansen Smith
- 1981 Lynn McKenzie
- 1980 Martha Josey
- 1979 Carol Goostree
- 1978 Lynn McKenzie
- 1977 Jackie Jo Perrin
- 1976 Connie Combs Kirby
- 1975 Jimmie Gibbs Munroe
- 1974 Jeana Day
- 1973 Gail Petska
- 1972 Gail Petska
- 1971 Donna Patterson
- 1970 Joyce Burk Loomis
- 1969 Missy Long
- 1968 Ann Lewis
- 1967 Loretta Manual
- 1966 Norita Krause Henderson
- 1965 Sammy Thurman Brackenbury
- 1964 Ardith Bruce
- 1963 Loretta Manual
- 1962 Sherry Combs Johnson
- 1961 Jane Mayo
- 1960 Jane Mayo
- 1959 Jane Mayo
- 1958 Billie McBride
- 1957 Billie McBride
- 1956 Billie McBride
- 1955 Billie McBride
- 1954 LaTonne Sewalt
- 1953 Wanda Harper Bush
- 1952 Wanda Harper Bush
- 1951 Margaret Owens
- 1950 LaTonne Sewalt
- 1949 Amy McGilvray
- 1948 Margaret Owens

=== WPRA Breakaway Roping Champions ===
- 2025 Taylor Munsell, Alva, Oklahoma
- 2024 Kelsie Domer, Dublin, Texas
- 2023 Shelby Boisjoli-Meged, Calgary, Alberta, Canada
- 2022 Martha Angelone, Stephenville, Texas
- 2021 Sawyer Gilbert, Buffalo, South Dakota
- 2020 Jackie Crawford, Stephenville, Texas

== NFR Average Champions ==
=== All-Around NFR Average Champions ===
- 2025 Stetson Wright, Beaver, Utah, $817,088
- 2024 Shad Mayfield, Clovis, New Mexico, $335,474
- 2023 Stetson Wright, Milford, Utah, $479,621
- 2022 Stetson Wright, Milford, Utah, $758,829
- 2021 Stetson Wright, Milford, Utah, $585,850
- 2020 Stetson Wright, Milford, Utah, $392,302
- 2019 Stetson Wright, Milford, Utah, $298,923
- 2018 Trevor Brazile, Decatur, Texas, $335,680
- 2017 Tuf Cooper, Weatherford, Texas, $341,560
- 2016 Junior Nogueira, Presidente Prudente, São Paulo, Brazil, $231,728
- 2015 Trevor Brazile, Decatur, Texas, $518,011
- 2014 Trevor Brazile, Decatur, Texas, $191,250
- 2013 Trevor Brazile, Decatur, Texas, $170,823
- 2012 Trevor Brazile, Decatur, Texas, $82,841
- 2011 Trevor Brazile, Decatur, Texas, $106,250
- 2010 Trevor Brazile, Decatur, Texas, $211,509
- 2009 Josh Peek, Pueblo, Colorado, $113,802
- 2008 Trevor Brazile, Decatur, Texas, $149,098
- 2007 Trevor Brazile, Decatur, Texas, $139,614
- 2006 Joe Beaver, Huntsville, Texas, $127,914
- 2005 Ryan Jarrett, Summerville, Georgia, $114,718
- 2004 Trevor Brazile, Decatur, Texas, $55,774
- 2003 Trevor Brazile, Decatur, Texas, $79,539
- 2002 Jesse Bail, Camp Cook, South Dakota, $65,609
- 2001 Jesse Bail, Camp Cook, South Dakota, $89,858
- 2000 Joe Beaver, Huntsville, Texas, $123,356
- 1999 Cody Ohl, Stephenville, Texas, $86,438
- 1998 Herbert Theriot, Poplarville, Mississippi, $107,899
- 1997 Joe Beaver, Huntsville, Texas, $83,228
- 1996 Herbert Theriot, Poplarville, Mississippi, $35,898
- 1995 Tee Woolman, Llano, Texas, $31,116
- 1994 Ty Murray, Stephenville, Texas, $33,259
- 1993 Ty Murray, Stephenville, Texas, $124,821
- 1992 Ty Murray, Stephenville, Texas, $86,268
- 1991 Ty Murray, Stephenville, Texas, $101,242
- 1990 Ty Murray, Stephenville, Texas, $72,818
- 1989 Ty Murray, Odessa, Texas, $58,031
- 1988 Lewis Feild, Elk Ridge, Utah, $64,724
- 1987 Lewis Feild, Elk Ridge, Utah, $75,212
- 1986 Lewis Feild, Elk Ridge, Utah, $46,620
- 1985 Tee Woolman, Llano, Texas $30,529
- 1984 Dee Pickett, Caldwell, Idaho, $30,677
- 1983 Roy Cooper, Durant, Oklahoma, $27,653
- 1982 Jimmie Cooper, Monument, New Mexico, $29,268
- 1981 Jimmie Cooper, Monument, New Mexico, $19,500
- 1980 Lyle Sankey, Branson, Missouri, $20,000
- 1979 Tom Ferguson, Miami, Oklahoma, $10,535
- 1978 Tom Ferguson, Miami, Oklahoma, $20,000
- 1977 Tom Ferguson, Miami, Oklahoma, $10,749
- 1976 Tom Ferguson, Miami, Oklahoma, $9,005
- 1975 Sandy Kirby, Greenville, Texas, $4,955
- 1974 Tom Ferguson, Miami, Oklahoma, $3,038
- 1973 Larry Mahan, Dallas, Texas, $6,575
- 1972 Phil Lyne, George West, Texas, $6,897
- 1971 Bobby Berger, Norman, Oklahoma, $4,019
- 1970 Larry Mahan, Brookes, Oregon, $2,887
- 1969 Larry Mahan, Salem, Oregon, $3,303
- 1968 Larry Mahan, Salem, Oregon, $2,462
- 1967 Larry Mahan, Brooks, Oregon, $3,885
- 1966 Dean Oliver, Boise, Idaho, $2,252
- 1965 Ken Stanton, Weiser, Idaho, $1,865
- 1964 Jim Bob Altizer, Del Rio, Texas, $2,341
- 1963 Sonny Worrell, Altoona, Kansas, $1,562
- 1962 Harley May, Oakdale, California, $2,326
- 1961 Benny Reynolds, Melrose, Montana, $2,610
- 1960 Don McLaughlin, Fort Worth, Texas, $3,172
- 1959 Jim Shoulders, Henryetta, Oklahoma, $3,478

=== Bareback Riding NFR Average Champions ===
- 2025 Sam Petersen, Helena, Montana, 854 10
- 2024 Dean Thompson, Altamont, Utah, 854.5 10
- 2023 Keenan Hayes, Hayden, Colorado, 850 10
- 2022 Jess Pope, Waverly, Kansas, 860 10
- 2021 Jess Pope, Waverly, Kansas, 873 10
- 2020 Jess Pope, Waverly, Kansas, 853 10
- 2019 Clayton Biglow, *886.5 10
- 2018 (tie) Tim O'Connell, Zwingle, Iowa, 849.5 10
- 2018 (tie) Steven Dent 849.5 10
- 2017 Tim O'Connell, Zwingle, Iowa, 835.5 10
- 2016 Tim O'Connell, Zwingle, Iowa, 842 10
- 2015 Steven Peebles, Redmond, Oregon, 832.5 10
- 2014 Kaycee Feild, Spanish Fork, Utah, 818.5 10
- 2013 Kaycee Feild, Spanish Fork, Utah 823 10
- 2012 Kaycee Feild, Spanish Fork, Utah 834 10
- 2011 Kaycee Feild, Payson, Utah, 860.5 10
- 2010 Justin McDaniel, Porum, Oklahoma, 836.5 10
- 2009 Bobby Mote, Culver, Oregon, 847 10
- 2008 Justin McDaniel, Porum, Oklahoma, 859 10
- 2007 Will Lowe, Canyon, Texas, 845 10
- 2006 Will Lowe, Canyon, Texas 821.5 10
- 2005 (tie) Kelly Timberman, Mills Wyoming 837.5 10
- 2005 (tie) Cimmaron Gerke, Fort Worth, Texas, 837.5 10
- 2004 Kelly Timberman, Mills, Wyoming, 836.5
- 2003 Cody Jessee, Pineville, Oregon, 839 10
- 2002 Jason Jeter, Fort Worth, Texas, 839 10
- 2001 Clint Corey, Powell Butte, Oregon, 811 10
- 2000 Jeffrey Collins, Redfield, Kansas, 816 10
- 1999 Lan LaJeunesse, Morgan, Utah, 813 10
- 1998 Mark Gomes, Hutchinson, Kansas, 786 10
- 1997 Eric Mouton, Weatherford, Oklahoma, 796 10
- 1996 Mark Garrett, Spearfish, South Dakota, 786 10
- 1995 Marvin Garrett, Belle Fourche, South Dakota, 775 10
- 1994 Brian Hawke, Azle, Texas, 769 10
- 1993 Ty Murray, Stephenville, Texas, 769 10
- 1992 Deb Greenough, East Helena, Montana, 783 10
- 1991 Wayne Herman, Dickinson, North Dakota, 783 10
- 1990 Chuck Logue, Decatur, Texas, 768 10
- 1989 Marvin Garrett, Belle Fourche, South Dakota, 775 10
- 1988 Dave Appleton, Arlington, Texas, 757 10
- 1987 Bruce Ford, Kersey, Colorado, 774 10
- 1986 Lewis Feild, Elk Ridge, Utah, 734 10
- 1985 Chuck Logue, McKinney, Texas, 752 10
- 1984 Lewis Feild, Elk Ridge, Utah, 752 10
- 1983 (tie) Larry Peabody, Bozeman, Montana 733 10
- 1983 (tie) Danny Brady, Henderson, Nevada, 733 10
- 1982 Bruce Ford, Kersey, Colorado, 752 10
- 1981 Jimmy Cleveland, Durant, Oklahoma, 765 10
- 1980 Bruce Ford, Kersey, Colorado, 730 10
- 1979 Bruce Ford, Kersey, Colorado, 719 10
- 1978 Mickey Young, Ferron, Utah, 796 11
- 1977 No average
- 1976 Jack Ward Jr., Odessa, Texas, 710 10
- 1975 Jack Ward Jr., Odessa, Texas, 745 10
- 1974 Jack Ward Jr., Odessa, Texas, 722 10
- 1973 Sandy Kirby, Greenville, Texas, 709 10
- 1972 Ace Berry, Modesto, California, 685 10
- 1971 Ace Berry, Modesto, California, 684 10
- 1970 John Edwards, Red Lodge, Montana, 664 10
- 1969 Royce Smith, Iona, Idaho, 597 9
- 1968 Jim Houston, Omaha, Nebraska, 611 9
- 1967 Clyde Vamvoras, Burkburnett, Texas, 562 9
- 1966 Gary Tucker, Carlsbad, New Mexico, 524 8
- 1965 Dennis Reiners, Clara City, Minnesota, 476 8
- 1964 Jack Buschbom, Mobridge, South Dakota, 464 8
- 1963 John Hawkins, Twain Harte, California, 1,409 8
- 1962 John Hawkins, Twain Harte, California, 1,403 8
- 1961 Jack Buschbom, Mobridge, South Dakota, 1,374 8
- 1960 Benny Reynolds, Dillon, Montana, 1,732 10
- 1959 Jack Buschbom, Cassville, Wisconsin, 1,790 10

Source: * record

=== Steer Wrestling NFR Average Champions ===
- 2025 Tucker Allen, Ventura, California, 46.4 10
- 2024 Cash Robb, Altamont, Utah, 43.1 10
- 2023 Don Payne, Stephenville, Texas, 44.9 10
- 2022 Kyle Irwin, Robertsdale, Alabama, 46.1 10
- 2021 Will Lummus, Byhalia, Mississippi, 43 10
- 2020 Jacob Edler, Alva, Oklahoma, 43.4 10
- 2019 Matt Reeves, Cross Plains, Texas, 48.4 10
- 2018 Tyler Waguespack, Gonzales, Mississippi, 44.5 10
- 2017 Dakota Eldrige, Elko, Nevada, 45.4 10
- 2016 Tyler Waguespack, Gonzales, Mississippi 41.9 10
- 2015 Dakota Eldridge, Elko, Nevada, 45.6 10
- 2014 Luke Branquinho, Los Alamos, California, 41.6 10
- 2013 Bray Armes, Gruver, Texas, 44.8 10
- 2012 Les Shepperson, Midwest, Wyoming, 48.6 10
- 2011 Luke Branquinho, Los Alamos, California, 41.9 10
- 2010 (tie) Dean Gorsuch, Gering, Nebraska, 45.7 10
- 2010 (tie) Billy Bugenig, Ferndale, California, 45.7 10
- 2009 Lee Graves, Calgary, Alberta, Canada, 45.1 10
- 2008 Luke Branquinho, Los Alamos, California, 41.9 10
- 2007 Jason Miller, Lance Creek, Wyoming, 42.7 10
- 2006 Dean Gorsuch, Gering, Nebraska, 47.8 10
- 2005 Lee Graves, Calgary, Alberta, Canada, 39.2 10
- 2004 Ronnie Fields, Oklahoma City, Oklahoma, 43.2 10
- 2003 Mickey Gee, Wichita Falls, Texas, 47.3 10
- 2002 Sid Steiner, Bastrop, Texas, 41.8 10
- 2001 Rope Myers, Van, Texas, *37.4 10
- 2000 Chad Biesemeyer, Stephenville, Texas, 50.7 10
- 1999 Mickey Gee, Wichita Falls, Texas, 42.0 10
- 1998 Mike Smith, Baton Rouge, Louisiana, 44.3 10
- 1997 Butch Myers, Athens, Texas, 43.3 10
- 1996 Mark Roy, Dalemead, Alberta, Canada, 44.8 10
- 1995 Rooster Reynolds, Twin Bridges, Montana, 64.3 10
- 1994 Blaine Pederson, Amisk, Alberta, Canada, 55.3 10
- 1993 Steve Duhon, Opelousas, Louisiana, 49.3 10
- 1992 Mark Roy, Dalemead, Alberta, Canada, 58.0 10
- 1991 Blaine Pederson, Amisk, Alberta, Canada, 59.1 10
- 1990 Ivan Teigen, Camp Cook, South Dakota, 72.2 10
- 1989 Marty Melvin, Holabid, South Dakota, 57.7 10
- 1988 John W. Jones Jr., Morrow Bay California, 64.1 10
- 1987 Steve Duhon, Opelousas, Louisiana, 48.1 10
- 1986 Butch Myers, Welda, Kansas, 44.3 10
- 1985 Ote Berry, Gordon, Nebraska, 49.3 10
- 1984 Roy Duvall, Checotah, Oklahoma, 57.8 10
- 1983 Jimmie Cooper, Monument, New Mexico, 78.5 10
- 1982 Chris Lybbert, Coyote, California, 78.7 10
- 1981 Tom Ferguson, Miami, Oklahoma, 69.5 10
- 1980 Paul Hughes, Kim, Colorado, 92.2 10
- 1979 Jack Hannum, Ogden, Utah, 87.7 10
- 1978 Tom Ferguson, Miami, Oklahoma, 97.5 11
- 1977 Tom Ferguson, Miami, Oklahoma, 65.8 10
- 1976 Tommy Puryear, Leander, Texas, 87.1 10
- 1975 Bob Christophersen, Glendive Montana, 69.0 10
- 1974 Bob Marshall, San Martin, California, 82.7 10
- 1973 Bob Marshall, San Martin, California, 71.6 10
- 1972 Jerry Peveto, Hugo, Oklahoma, 82.8 10
- 1971 Bob Christophersen, Sioux City, Iowa, 75.2 10
- 1970 John W Jones Sr., Morror Bay, California, 85.8 10
- 1969 John W Jones Sr., Morror Bay, California, 60.0 9
- 1968 John W Jones Sr., Morror Bay, California, 67.5 9
- 1967 Walt Linderman, Belfry, Montana, 70.0 9
- 1966 Jack Roddy, San Jose, California, 74.6 8
- 1965 John W Jones Sr., Morror Bay, California, 91.0 8
- 1964 Billy Hale, Checotah, Oklahoma, 69.2 8
- 1963 Billy Hale, Checotah, Oklahoma, 101.6 8
- 1962 Mark Schricker, Sutherlin, Oregon, 85.7 8
- 1961 C.R. Boucher, Burkburnett, Texas, 81.1 8
- 1960 Harley May, Oakdale, California, 79.9 10
- 1959 Willard Combs, Checotah, Oklahoma, 111.6 10

Source: * record

=== Team Roping NFR Average Champions ===
- 2025 Andrew Ward/Jake Long, 44 10
- 2024 Clint Summers/Jake Long, 44.3 10
- 2023 Derrick Begay/Colter Todd, 69 10
- 2022 Patrick Smith/Tanner Tomlinson, *53 10
- 2021 Buddy Hawkins/Andrew Ward, 54.70 10
- 2020 Erich Rogers/Paden Bray, 80.2 10
- 2019 Cody Snow, Los Olivos, California, 43.80 9 10
- 2019 Wesley Thorp, Throckmorton, Texas, 43.80 9 10
- 2018 Aaron Tsinigine, Tuba City, Arizona 69.6 10
- 2018 Trey Yates, Pueblo, Colorado
- 2017 Chad Masers, Cedar Hills, Tennessee
- 2017 Travis Graves, Jay, Oklahoma, 61.2 10
- 2016 Levi Simpson, Ponoka, Alberta, Canada
- 2016 Jeremy Buhler, Arrowwood, Alberta, Canada, 54.2 9 10
- 2015 Luke Brown, Stephenville, Texas
- 2015 Kollin VonAhn, Blanchard, Oklahoma, 65.3 10
- 2014 Clay Tryan, Billings, Montana
- 2014 Jade Corkill, Fallon, Nevada, 70.1 10
- 2013 Luke Brown, Stephenville Texas
- 2013 Kollin VonAhn, Blanchard, Oklahoma, 56.2 9 10
- 2012 Chad Masters, Cedar Hill, Tennessee
- 2012 Clay O'Brien Cooper, Gardenerville, Nevada, 73.4 10
- 2011 Turtle Powell, Stephenville, Texas
- 2011 Jhett Johnson, Casper, Wyoming, 57.5 9 10
- 2010 Luke Brown, Rock Hill, South Carolina, 65.5 10
- 2009 Nick Sartain, Yukon, Oklahoma
- 2009 Kollin VohAhn, Durant, Oklahoma, 59.2 10
- 2008 Trevor Brazile, Decatur, Texas
- 2008 Patrick Smith, Midland, Texas, 60.1 10
- 2007 Jake Barnes, Scottsdale, Arizona
- 2007 Clay O'Brien Cooper, Morgan Mill, Texas, 72.6 10
- 2006 Chad Masters, Adams, Tennessee
- 2006 Allen Bach, Weatherford, Texas, 88.5 10
- 2005 Tee Woolman, Llano, Texas
- 2005 Cory Petska, Lexington, Oklahoma, 71.7 10
- 2004 Clay Tryan, Billings, Montana
- 2004 Michael Jones, Stephenville, Texas, 77.8 10
- 2003 Matt Tyler, Dennis, Texas
- 2003 Patrick Smith, Midland, Texas, 62.3 10
- 2002 J.D. Yates, Pueblo, Colorado
- 2002 Bobby Harris, Gillette, Wyoming, 96.6 10
- 2001 Speed Williams, Jacksonville, Florida
- 2001 Rich Skelton, Llano, Texas, 92.8 10
- 2000 Charles Pogue, Ringling, Oklahoma
- 2000 Britt Bockius, Claremore, Oklahoma, 73.3 10
- 1999 Jimmy Tanner, Tifton, Georgia
- 1999 Brad Culpepper, Poulan, Georgia, 83.9 10
- 1998 Jimmy Tanner, Tifton, Georgia
- 1998 Brad Culpepper, Sylvester, Georgia, 68.0 10
- 1997 Bret Boatright, Mulhall, Oklahoma
- 1997 Kory Koontz, Sudan, Texas, 83.0 10
- 1996 Steve Purcella, Hereford, Texas
- 1996 Steve Northcott, Odessa, Texas, 70.9 10
- 1995 Kermit Maass, Snook, Texas
- 1995 Tyler Magnus, Manor, Texas, 62.9 10
- 1994 Jake Barnes, Cave Creek, Arizona
- 1994 Clay O'Brien Cooper, Higley, Arizona 59.1 10
- 1993 Kevin Stewart, Glen Rose, Texas
- 1993 Jacky Stephenson, Charlotte, Texas, 100.5 10
- 1992 Mark Simon, Florence, Arizona
- 1992 Bret Tonozzi, Fruita, Colorado, 80.8 10
- 1991 David Motes, Fresno, California
- 1991 Bret Tonozzi, Fruita, Colorado, 85.9 10
- 1990 Tee Woolman, Llano, Texas
- 1990 Bobby Harris, Gillette, Wyoming, 78.8 10
- 1989 Bret Boatright, Conway Springs, Kansas
- 1989 Steve Northcott, Odessa, Texas, 78.8 10
- 1988 Charles Pogue, Ringling, Oklahoma
- 1988 Rickey Green, Burbank, California, 99.7 10
- 1987 (tie) Tee Woolman, Llano, Texas
- 1987 (tie) Bob Harris, Voca, Texas, 77.2 10
- 1987 (tie) Jake Milton, Torrington, Wyoming
- 1987 (tie) Walt Woodard, Stockton, California, 77.2
- 1986 Paul Petska, Carlsbad, New Mexico
- 1986 Monty Joe Petska, Carlsbad, New Mexico, 90.2 10
- 1985 Jake Barnes, Bloomfield, New Mexico
- 1985 David Motes, Fresno, California
- 1985 Clay O'Brien Cooper, Chandler Heights, Arizona, 87.8 10
- 1984 David Motes, Fresno, California
- 1984 Dennis Watkins, Taft, California, 82.4 10
- 1983 Jake Milton, Torrington, Wyoming
- 1983 Lee Woodbury, Nampa, Idaho, 99.2 10
- 1982 Tee Woolman, Fredonia, Texas
- 1982 Leo Camarillo, Lockeford, California, 80.8
- 1981 David Motes, Fresno, California
- 1981 Dennis Watkins, Chowchilla, California, 91.6
- 1980 Tee Woolman, Llano, Texas
- 1980 Leo Camarillo, Lockeford, California, 98.7 10
- 1979 Jesse James, Porterville, California
- 1979 Allen Bach, Queen Creek, Arizona, 107.5 10
- 1978 George Richards, Humboldt, Arizona
- 1978 Brad Smith, Prescott, Arizona, 105.8 11
- 1977 David Motes, Fresno, California
- 1977 Dennis Motes, Mesa, Arizona, 94.6 10
- 1976 Doyle Gellerman, Oakdale, California
- 1976 Frank Ferreira Sr., Fresno, California, 102.2 10
- 1975 Reg Camarillo, Oakdale, California
- 1975 Jerold Camarillo, Oakdale, California, 106.7 10
- 1974 Jim Wheatley, Hughson, California
- 1974 John Bill Rodriguez, Castroville, California, 104.3 10
- 1973 Jim Rodriguez Jr., Paso Robles, California
- 1973 Ken Luman, Visalia, California, 100.4 10
- 1972 John J. Miller, Pawhuska, Oklahoma
- 1972 Ace Berry, Modesto, California, 124.7 10
- 1971 Reg Camarillo, Mesa, Arizona
- 1971 Leo Camarillo, Donald, Oregon, 154.5 10
- 1970 Reg Camarillo, Mesa, Arizona
- 1970 Leo Camarillo, Donald, Oregon, 126.9 10
- 1969 Reg Camarillo, Mesa, Arizona
- 1969 Leo Camarillo, Donald, Oregon, 115.6 9
- 1968 Billy Wilson, Arroyo Grande, California
- 1968 Leo Camarillo, Donald, Oregon, 104.6 9
- 1967 Bucky Bradford Jr., Tuczon, Arizona
- 1967 Ace Berry, Modesto, California, 141.7 9
- 1966 Jim Rodriguez Jr., Paso Robles, California
- 1966 Ken Luman, Merced, California 116.2 8
- 1965 Billy Darnell, Rodeo, New Mexico
- 1965 Bronc Curry, Thousand Oaks, California 100.6 8
- 1964 Byron Gist, Lakeside, California
- 1964 Gary Gist, Lakeside, California, 114.2 8
- 1963 Les Hirdes, Turlock, California
- 1963 Al Hooper, Reno, Nevada, 100.9 8
- 1962 Les Hirdes, Turlock California
- 1962 Julius Boschi, Patterson, California, 134.5 8
- 1961 Sam Edmondson, Fresno, California
- 1961 R.D. Rutledge, Tulare, California, 124.1 8
- 1960 Jim Rodriguez Jr., San Luis Obispo, California
- 1960 Gene Rambo, Shandon, California 134.8 8
- 1959 Jim Rodriguez Jr., San Luis Obispo, California
- 1959 Gene Rambo, Shando, California 121.8 6

Source: * record

=== Saddle Bronc Riding NFR Average Champions ===
- 2025 Statler Wright, Beaver, Utah, 864.25 10
- 2024 Wyatt Casper, Miami, Texas, 853 10
- 2023 Zeke Thurston, Big Valley Alberta, Canada, 863 10
- 2022 Zeke Thurston, Big Valley Alberta, Canada, *876.5 10
- 2021 Brody Cress, Hillsdale, Wyoming, 859 10
- 2020 Ryder Wright, Milford, Utah, *876.5 10
- 2019 Brody Cress, Hillsdale, Wyoming, 840.5 10
- 2018 CoBurn Bradshaw 848.5 10
- 2017 Brody Cress, Hillsdale, Wyoming, 841.5 10
- 2016 Zeke Thurston, Big Valley, Alberta, Canada 747.5 9
- 2015 Jacobs Crawley, Boerne, Texas, 810.5 10
- 2014 Spencer Wright, Milford, Utah, 807.5 10
- 2013 Jacobs Crawley, Stephenville, Texas, 778.5 10
- 2012 Cody DeMoss, Heflin, Louisiana, 798.5 10
- 2011 Jesse Wright, Milford, Utah, 848.5 10
- 2010 Cody Wright, Milford, Utah, 847 10
- 2009 Shaun Stroh, Dickinson, North Dakota, 732.5 9/10
- 2008 Cody Taton, Newell, South Dakota, 720.5 9/10
- 2007 Rod Hay, Wildwood, Alberta, Canada, 826 10
- 2006 J.J. Elshere, Quinn, South Dakota, 723 9/10
- 2005 Rod Warren, Big Valley, Alberta, Canada, 798 10
- 2004 Rod Warren, Big Valley, Alberta, Canada, 757.5 10
- 2003 Rod Warren, Big Valley, Alberta, Canada, 805 10
- 2002 Glen O'Neill, Didsbury, Alberta, Canada, 825 10
- 2001 Scott Johnson, Gustine, Texas, 719 9/10
- 2000 Ryan Mapston, Geyser, Montana, 721 9/10
- 1999 Charley Gardner, Ruby Valley, Montana, 757 10
- 1998 Rod Warren, Water Valley, 755, 10
- 1997 Scott Johnson, DeLeon, Texas, 781 10
- 1996 Billy Etbauer, Ree Heights, South Dakota, 805 10
- 1995 Robert Etbauer, Goodwell, Oklahoma, 750 10
- 1994 Dan Mortensen, Manhattan, Montana, 791 10
- 1993 Tom Reeves, Stephenville, Texas, 725, 10
- 1992 Billy Etbauer, Ree Heights, South Dakota, 714 9/10
- 1991 Robert Etbauer, Goodwell, Oklahoma, 766 10
- 1990 Bud Longbrake, Dupree, South Dakota, 752 10
- 1989 Clint Johnson, Spearfish, South Dakota, 746 10
- 1988 Brad Gjermundson, Marshall, North Dakota, 746 10
- 1987 Butch Knowles, Hermiston, Oregon, 728 10
- 1986 Dave Appleton, Arlington, Texas, 698 10
- 1985 (tie) Bud Pauley, Shepherd, Montana, 728 10
- 1985 (tie) Monty Henson, Mesquite, Texas, 728 10
- 1984 Monty Henson, Mesquite, Texas, 755 10
- 1983 Brad Gjermundson, Marshall, North Dakota, 742 10
- 1982 Monty Henson, Mesquite, Texas, 657 9/10
- 1981 Tom Miller, Faith, South Dakota, 719 10
- 1980 Bobby Berger, Lexington, Oklahoma, 705 10
- 1979 Tom Miller, Faith, South Dakota, 723 10
- 1978 Joe Marvel, Battle Mountain, Nevada, 844 11
- 1977 No average
- 1976 Monty Henson, Mesquite, Texas, 717 10
- 1975 Tom Miller, Faith, South Dakota, 734 10
- 1974 Joe Marvel, Battle Mountain, Nevada, 725 10
- 1973 Dennis Reiners, Scottsdale, Arizona 703 10
- 1972 Marvin Joyce, East Helena, Montana, 644 10
- 1971 Kenny McLean, Okanagan Falls, British Columbia, Canada, 662 10
- 1970 Ivan Daines, Innisfail, Alberta, Canada, 687 10
- 1969 Buzz Seely, Roosevelt, Washington, 584 9
- 1968 Kenny McLean, Okanagan Falls, British Columbia, Canada, 586 9
- 1967 Larry Mahan, Brooks, Oregon, 578 9
- 1966 Marty Wood, Bowness, Alberta, Canada, 528 8
- 1965 Bill Martinelli, Oakdale, California, 542 8
- 1964 Kenny McLean, Okanagan Falls, British Columbia, Canada, 473 8
- 1963 Jim Tescher, Medora, North Dakota, 1,414 8
- 1962 Alvin Nelson, Sidney, Montana, 1,401 8
- 1961 Alvin Nelson, Sidney, Montana, 1,390 8
- 1960 Enoch Walker, Cody, Wyoming, 1,789 10
- 1959 Jim Tescher, Medora, North Dakota, 1,806 10

Source: * record

=== Tie-Down Roping NFR Average Champions ===
- 2025 Riley Webb, Denton, Texas, 82.3 10
- 2024 Riley Webb, Denton, Texas, 79.70 10
- 2023 Haven Meged, Miles City, Montana, 77.4 10
- 2022 Caleb Smidt, Huntsville, Texas 82.5 10
- 2021 Caleb Smidt, Huntsville, Texas 83.1 10
- 2020 Shane Hanchey, Sulphur, Louisiana, 83.1 10
- 2019 Haven Meged, Miles City, Montana, 85.7 10
- 2018 Caleb Smidt, Bellville, Texas, 83.7 10
- 2017 Marcos Costa, Childress, Texas 81.3 10
- 2016 Riley Pruitt, Gering Nebraska, 85.9 10
- 2015 Caleb Smidt, Bellville, Texas, 80.7 10
- 2014 Tuf Cooper, Decatur, Texas, 89.7 10
- 2013 Shane Hanchey, Sulpher, Louisiana, *80.1 10
- 2012 Adam Gray, Seymour, Texas, 87.8 10
- 2011 Matt Shiozawa, Chubbuck, Idaho, 88.6 10
- 2010 Trevor Brazile, Decatur, Texas, 88.6 10
- 2009 Tuf Cooper, Decatur, Texas, 84.5 10
- 2008 Stran Smith, Childress, Texas, 87.1 10
- 2007 Cody Ohl, Hico, Texas, 90.8 10
- 2006 Cody Ohl, Hico, Texas, 84.3 10
- 2005 Ryan Jarrett, Summerville, Georgia, 89.0 10
- 2004 Monty Lewis, Hereford, Texas, 87.8 10
- 2003 Mike Johnson, Henryetta, Oklahoma, 86.4 10
- 2002 Fred Whitfield, Hockley, Texas, 88.8 10
- 2001 Jerome Schneeberger, Ponca City, Oklahoma, 109.6 10
- 2000 Brent Lewis, Pinon, New Mexico, 86.9 10
- 1999 Fred Whitfield, Hockley, Texas, 84.0 10
- 1998 Cody Ohl, Stephenville, Texas, 91.6 10
- 1997 Fred Whitfield, Hockley, Texas 84.0 10
- 1996 Joe Beaver, Huntsville, Texas, 101.9 10
- 1995 Roy Cooper, Childress, Texas, 101.8 10
- 1994 Tod Sloane, Canyon Lake, 99.5 10
- 1993 Troy Pruitt, Minatare, Nebraska, 96.4
- 1992 Joe Beaver, Huntsville, Texas, 96.8 10
- 1991 Fred Whitfield, Cypress, Texas, 91.7 10
- 1990 Herbert Theriot, Wiggins, Mississippi, 106.8 10
- 1989 David Bowen, Yoakum, Texas, 110.6 10
- 1988 Joe Beaver, Victoria, Texas, 117.1 10
- 1987 Joe Beaver, Victoria, Texas, 112.3
- 1986 D.R. Daniel, Okeechobee, Florida, 102.6 10
- 1985 Mike McLaughin, Fort Worth, Texas, 102.6 10
- 1984 Dee Pickett, Caldwell, Idaho, 114.9
- 1983 Roy Cooper, Durant, Oklahoma, 109.1 10
- 1982 Mike McLaughlin, Saginaw, Texas, 122.2 10
- 1981 Chris Lybbert, Coyote, California, 113.4 10
- 1980 Chris Lybbert, Coyote, California, 123.5 10
- 1979 Roy Cooper, Durant, Oklahoma, 107.9 10
- 1978 Gary Ledford, Comanche, Oklahoma, 134.9 11
- 1977 Jim Gladstone, Cardstone, Alberta, Canada, 119.7 10
- 1976 Roy Cooper, Durant, Oklahoma, 133.4 10
- 1975 Bobby Goodspeed, High Ridge, Missouri, 140.6 10
- 1974 Ronnye Sewalt, Chico, Texas, 137.6 10
- 1973 Barry Burk, Duncan, Oklahoma, 144.8
- 1972 Phil Lyne, George West, Texas, 129.7 10
- 1971 Olin Young, Peralta, New Mexico, 139.6 10
- 1970 Richard Stowers, Duncan, Oklahoma, 134.7 10
- 1969 Mark Schricker, Sutherlin, Oregon, 125 9
- 1968 Junior Garrison, Marlow, Oklahoma, 128.6 9
- 1967 Glen Franklin, House, New Mexico, 131.4 9
- 1966 Lee Cocrell, Panhandle, Texas, 124.5 8
- 1965 Jim Bob Altizer, Del Rio, Texas, 114.6 8
- 1964 Jim Bob Altizer, Del Rio, Texas, 1203 8
- 1963 Olin Young, Albuquerque, New Mexico, 112.6 8
- 1962 Olin Young, Albuquerque, New Mexico, 122.1 8
- 1961 Dean Oliver, Boise, Idaho, 124 8
- 1960 Don McLaughlin, Fort Collins, Colorado, 161.6 10
- 1559 Olin Young, Albuquerque, New Mexico, 191.3 10

=== Bull Riding NFR Average Champions ===
- 2025 T.J. Gray, Dairy, Oregon, 610.5 7/10
- 2024 Josh Frost, Randlett, Utah, 580.0 7/10
- 2023 Ky Hamilton, Mackay, Queensland, Australia, 514.5 6/10
- 2022 Stetson Wright, Milford, Utah, 684.5 8/10
- 2021 Josh Frost, Randlett, Utah, 568.5 7/10
- 2020 Colten Fritzlan, Rifle, Colorado, 605 7/10
- 2019 Sage Kimzey, Strong City, Oklahoma, 709 8/10
- 2018 Chase Dougherty, Canby, Oregon, 603.5 7/10
- 2017 Sage Kimzey, Strong City, Oklahoma, 601.5 7/10
- 2016 Shane Proctor, Grand Coulee, Washington, 590 7/10
- 2015 Cody Teel, Kountze, Texas, 590 7/10
- 2014 Sage Kimzey, Strong City, Oklahoma, 671 8/10
- 2013 Cody Teel, Kountze, Texas, 651.5 8/10
- 2012 Beau Schroeder, China, Texas, 423 5/10
- 2011 L.J. Jenkins, Porum, Oklahoma, 501 6/10
- 2010 J.W. Harris, Mullin, Texas, 714 8/10
- 2009 Kanin Asay, Powell, Wyoming, 434 5/10
- 2008 J.W. Harris, May, Texas, 507 6/10
- 2007 Wesley Silcox, Payson, Utah, 596 7/10
- 2006 B.J. Schumacher, Hillsboro, Wisconsin, 696.6 8/10
- 2005 Matt Austin, Wills Point, Texas, 586.5 7/10
- 2004 Paulo Crimber, Haltom City, Texas, 500.5 6/10
- 2003 Greg Potter, Whitt, Texas, 502.5 6/10
- 2002 Blue Stone, Ogden, Utah, 520 6/10
- 2001 Blue Stone, Ogden, Utah, 693 8/10
- 2000 Philip Elkins, Keller, Texas, 665 8/10
- 1999 Mike White, Big Spring, Texas, 518 6/10
- 1998 Ty Murray, Stephenville, Texas, 491 6/10
- 1997 Scott Mendes, Weatherford, Texas, 557 7/10
- 1996 Adriano Morães, Keller, Texas, 724 9/10
- 1995 Jerome Davis, Archdale, North Carolina, 736, 9/10
- 1994 Adriano Morães, Keller, Texas, 773 10/10
- 1993 Daryl Mills, Pink Mountain, British Columbia, Canada, 650 8/10
- 1992 Jim Sharp, Stephenville, Texas, 570 7/10
- 1991 Michael Gaffney, Lubbock, Texas, 701 9/10
- 1990 Norman Curry, DeBerry, Texas, *800 10/10
- 1989 (tie) Tuff Hedeman, Bowie, Texas, 709 9/10
- 1989 (tie) Jim Sharp, Kermit, Texas, 709 9/10
- 1988 Jim Sharp, Kermit, Texas, 771 10/10
- 1987 Tuff Hedeman, Bowie, Texas
- 1986 Lane Frost, Lane, Oklahoma, 678 8/10
- 1985 Ted Nuce, Manteca, California, 697 9/10
- 1984 Glen McIlvain, Mesquite, Texas, 630 8/10
- 1983 Rickey Lindsey, Huntsville, Texas, 625 8/10
- 1982 Denny Flynn, Charleston, Arkansas, 538 7/10
- 1981 Denny Flynn, Charleston, Arkansas, 700 9/10
- 1980 Lyle Sankey, Branson, Missouri, 695 9/10
- 1979 John Davis, Homedale, Idaho, 641 8/10
- 1978 Lyle Sankey, Augusta, Kansas, 688 9/11
- 1977 No average
- 1976 Don Gay, Mesquite, Texas, 558 7/10
- 1975 Denny Flynn, Springdale, Arkansas, 631 9/10
- 1974 Sandy Kirby, Greenville, Texas, 540 8/10
- 1973 Marvin Paul Shoulders, Henryetta, Oklahoma, 747 9/10
- 1972 Phil Lyne, George West, Texas, 637 9/10
- 1971 Bob Berger, Norman, Oklahoma, 648 9/10
- 1970 Gary Leffew, Santa Maria California, 594 9/10
- 1969 Bobby Berger, Halstead, Kansas, 594 8/9
- 1968 George Paul, Del Rio, Texas 615 8/9
- 1967 Freckles Brown, Soper, Oklahoma, 480 7/9
- 1966 Bob Wegner, Auburn, Washington, 404 6/8
- 1965 Ron Rossen, Broadus, Montana, 447 7/8
- 1964 (tie) Bob Wegner, Auburn, Washington, 359 6/8
- 1964 (tie) Ron Rossen, Broadus, Montana, 359 6/8
- 1963 Leo Brow, Czar, Alberta, Canada, 1,384 8/8
- 1962 Bob Robinson, Porterville, California, 1,014 6/8
- 1961 Bernis Johnson, Cleburne, Texas, 1,197 7/8
- 1960 Duane Howard, Minnewaukan, North Dakota, 1,416 8/10
- 1959 Jim Shoulders, Henryetta, Oklahoma, 1,611 9/10

Source: * record

=== Steer Roping NFSR Average Champions ===
- 2025 Jess Tierney, Hermosa, South Dakota, 148.3 10
- 2024 Scott Snedecor, Fredericksburg, Texas, 109.6 9
- 2023 Rocky Patterson, Pratt, Kansas, 132.8 10
- 2022 Cody Lee, Marana, Arizona, 123.3 10
- 2021 Cole Patterson, Pratt, Kansas, 97.7 9
- 2020 Trevor Brazile, Decatur, Texas, 124.5 10
- 2019 Trevor Brazile, Decatur, Texas, 131 0 10
- 2018 Cody Lee, Gatesville, Texas, 132 0 10
- 2017 Scott Snedecor, Fredericksburg, Texas, 104 1 9
- 2016 Cody Lee, Gatesville, Texas, 125.9 10
- 2015 Trevor Brazile, Decatur, Texas, *113.3 10
- 2014 Trevor Brazile, Decatur, Texas, 114.1 10
- 2013 Tony Reina, Whaton, Texas, 142.2 10
- 2012 Trevor Brazile, Decatur, Texas, 131.7 10
- 2011 Scott Snedecor, Fredericksburg, Texas, 172.8 10
- 2010 Cody Scheck, Kiowa, Kansas, 171.1 10
- 2009 Bryce Davis, Kiowa, Kansas, 137.9 10
- 2008 J.D. Yates, Pueblo, Colorado, 148.2 10
- 2007 Jarrett Blessing, Paradise, Texas, 127.5 10
- 2006 J.R. Olson, Sheridan, Wyoming, 127.0 9
- 2005 Scott Snedecor, Uvalde, Texas, 123.4 10
- 2004 Guy Allen, Santa Anna, Texas, 128.2 10
- 2003 Ora Taton, Rapid City, South Dakota, 159.9 10
- 2002 Chet Herren, Pawhuska, Oklahoma, 223.2 10
- 2001 Rocky Patterson, Pratt, Kansas, 114.5 10
- 2000 Guy Allen, Lovington, New Mexico, 139.3 10
- 1999 Rocky Patterson, Pratt, Kansas, 146.7 10
- 1998 Tee Woolman, Llano, Texas, 168.7 10
- 1997 Guy Allen, Lovington, New Mexico, 136.2 10
- 1996 Roy Cooper, Childress, Texas, 131.5 10
- 1995 Arnold Felts, Sonora, Texas, 148.8 10
- 1994 Arnold Felts, Sonora, Texas, 159.4 10
- 1993 Roy Cooper, Childress, Texas, 147.8 10
- 1992 Arnold Felts, Sonora, Texas, 172.8 10
- 1991 Guy Allen, Vinita, Oklahoma, 160.8 10
- 1990 Neil Worrell, Fredonia, Kansas, 175.2 10
- 1989 Guy Allen, Lovington, New Mexico, 144.2 10
- 1988 Jim Davis, Bandera, Texas, 155 10
- 1987 Rod Pratt, Sharon Springs, Kansas, 148.6 10
- 1986 Phil Lyne, Cotulla, Texas, 184.8 10
- 1985 Roy Cooper, Durant, Oklahoma, 153.2 10
- 1984 Roy Cooper, Durant, Oklahoma, 146.7 10
- 1983 Phil Lyne, Cotulla, Texas, 176.7 10
- 1982 Wade Lewis, Hereford, Texas, 222.8 10
- 1981 Terry McGinley, Keystone, Nebraska, 194.4 10
- 1980 Terry McGinley, Keystone, Nebraska, 200.4 10
- 1979 Gary Good, Elida, New Mexico, 208.3 10
- 1978 Walt Arnold, Silverton, Texas, 228.2 10
- 1977 Olin Young, Peralta, New Mexico, 204 10
- 1976 Charles Good, Elida, New Mexico, 182.2 10
- 1975 Dewey Lee David, Riverton, Wyoming, 150.8 8
- 1974 Olin Young, Peralta, New Mexico, 149.1 8
- 1973 Eddie Becker, Ashby, Nebraska, 197.7 8
- 1972 Joe Snively, Sedan, Kansas, 131.7 6
- 1971 James Allen, Santa Anna, Texas, 117.1 6
- 1970 Dewey Lee David, Riverton, Wyoming, 214.5 5
- 1969 Tim Prather, Post, Texas, 125.5 6
- 1968 Sonny Davis, Kenna, New Mexico, 120.8 6
- 1967 Olin Young, Peralta, New Mexico, 127.5 6
- 1966 Kelly Corbin, Delaware, Oklahoma, 108.1 6
- 1965 Walt Arnold, Silverton, Texas, 124.4 6
- 1964 Don McLaughlin, Fort Collins, Colorado, 178.2 6
- 1963 Glen Nutter, Thedford, Nebraska, 114.9 6
- 1962 Everett Shaw, Stonewall, Oklahoma, 124.3 6
- 1961 Joe Snively Sr., Pawhuska, Oklahoma, 145.6 6
- 1960 Don McLaughlin, Fort Collins, Colorado, 125.2 6
- 1959 Jim Snively Sr., Pawhuska, Oklahoma, 170.4 6

Source: * record

=== Barrel Racing NFR Average Champions ===
- 2025 Julie Plourde, 139.67/10
- 2024 Andrea Busby, 136.18/10
- 2023 Lisa Lockhart, 137.18/10
- 2022 Shelley Morgan, 137.28/10
- 2021 Jordon Briggs, 136.83/10
- 2020 Hailey Kinsel, 170.95/10
- 2019 Ivy Conrado, 138.44/10
- 2018 Carman Pozzobon, 139.46/10
- 2017 Nellie Miller, 137.32
- 2016 Lisa Lockhart, 137.98**
- 2015 Callie duPerier, 140.41
- 2014 Lisa Lockhart, 144.93
- 2013 Sherry Cervi, 138.15
- 2012 Brenda Mays, 141.79
- 2011 Lindsay Sears, 139.50
- 2010 Jill Moody, 138.26
- 2009 Sherry Cervi, 139.01
- 2008 Jill Moody, 140.11
- 2007 Brittany Pozzi, 140.18
- 2006 Brittany Pozzi, 141.12
- 2005 Liz Pinkston, 142.65
- 2004 Molly Powell, 140.93
- 2003 Janae Ward, 140.50
- 2002 Charmayne James, 141.75
- 2001 Kappy Allen, 142.20
- 2000* Kappy Allen, 140.01
- 1999* Sherry Cervi, 141.56
- 1998* Kristie Peterson, 141.58
- 1997 Kristie Peterson, 143.28
- 1996 Kristie Peterson, 141.89
- 1995 Kristie Peterson, 142.22
- 1994 Kristie Peterson, 143.83
- 1993 Charmayne James, 145.14
- 1992 Vana Beissinger, 143.33
- 1991 Kim West, 144.01
- 1990 Charmayne James, 145.39
- 1989 Charmayne James, 146.33
- 1988 Marlene McRae, 142.85
- 1987 Charmayne James, 143.51
- 1986* Charmayne James, 138.93
- 1985 Janet Powell, 145.38
- 1984 Charmayne James
- 1983 Marlene Eddleman McRae
- 1982 Paula Fortner Barthle
- 1981 Donna Krening
- 1980 Donna Krening
- 1978 Lynn McKenzie
- 1977 Jackie Jo Perrin
- 1976 Connie Combs Kirby
- 1975 Connie Combs Kirby
- 1974 Colette Grave Baier
- 1973 Becky Carson
- 1972 Gail Petska
- 1971 Donna Patterson
- 1970 Joyce Burk Loomis
- 1969 Missy Long
- 1968 Kathie O'Brien
- 1967 Frances Smith
- 1966 Allene Gaylor Mourne
- 1965 Pat Marr
- 1964 Allene Gaylor Mourne
- 1963 Sis Armstrong
- 1962 Sissy Thurman
- 1961 Boots Tucker
- 1960 Jane Mayo
- 1959 Jane Mayo

Source: *different pattern

=== Breakaway Roping NFBR Average Champions ===
- 2025 Riley George, Oakdale, California, 29.0 10
- 2024 Kelsie Domer, Dublin, Texas, 22.0 10
- 2023 Cheyanne McCartney, Kingston, Oklahoma, 32.2 9
- 2022 Cadee Williams, Weatherford, Texas, 31.9 10
- 2021 Sawyer Gilbert, Buffalo, South Dakota, 46.3 10

== Other champions and awards ==
=== Xtreme Bulls Tour Champions ===
Year	Name	Hometown	State	Money Won
2003	(United States) Mike Moore	Kankakee	Illinois	$68,590
2004	(United States) B. J. Schumacher	Hillsboro	Wisconsin	$32,900
2005	(United States) Matt Austin	Wills Point	Texas	$119,584
2006	(United States) Zeb Lanham	Sweet	Idaho	$50,221
2007	(United States) Kanin Asay	Powell	Wyoming	$72,133
2008	(United States) Chance Smart	Philadelphia	Mississippi	$72,788
2009	(United States) Cody Hancock	Taylor	Arizona	$37,077
2010	(United States) Wesley Silcox	Santaquin	Utah	$37,758
2011	(United States) Shane Proctor	Grand Coulee	Washington	$57,246
2012	(United States) Kanin Asay	Powell	Wyoming	$53,703
2013	(United States) Tyler Smith	Fruita	Colorado	$41,813
2014	(United States) J.W. Harris	Mullin	Texas	$47,726
2015	(United States) Sage Kimzey	Strong City	Oklahoma	$53,503
2016	(United States) Rorey Maier	Timber Lake	South Dakota	$39,995
2017	(United States) Sage Kimzey	Strong City	Oklahoma	$58,657
2018	(United States) Sage Kimzey	Strong City	Oklahoma	$79,979
2019	(United States) Sage Kimzey	Strong City	Oklahoma	$88,348
2020	(United States) Boudreaux Campbell	Crockett	Texas	$44,286
2021	(United States) Sage Kimzey	Strong City	Oklahoma	$102,517
2022	(United States) Stetson Wright	Milford	Utah	$73,945
2023	(United States) Stetson Wright	Milford	Utah	$104,808
2024	(United States) Josh Frost	Randlett	Utah	$95,385
2025	(Australia) Ky Hamilton	Mackay	Queensland	$113,722
2026	(United States) Noah Lee	Mineral Wells	Texas	$129,951

=== Stock Contractor of the Year ===
- 2025 Frontier Rodeo
- 2024 Frontier Rodeo
- 2023 Frontier Rodeo
- 2022 Frontier Rodeo
- 2021 Frontier Rodeo
- 2020 Frontier Rodeo
- 2019 Frontier Rodeo
- 2018 Frontier Rodeo
- 2017 Frontier Rodeo
- 2016 Frontier Rodeo
- 2015 Frontier Rodeo
- 2014 Stace Smith
- 2013 Stace Smith
- 2012 Stace Smith
- 2011 Stace Smith
- 2010 Stace Smith
- 2009 Stace Smith
- 2008 Stace Smith
- 2007 Stace Smith
- 2006 Stace Smith
- 2005 Stace Smith
- 2004 Stace Smith
- 2003 Scotty Lovelace
- 2002 Sammy Andrews
- 2001 Mike Cervi
- 2000 John Growney
- 1999 Ike Sankey
- 1998 Mack Altizer
- 1997 Bennie Beutler
- 1996 Harry Vold
- 1995 Harry Vold
- 1994 Harry Vold
- 1993 Harry Vold
- 1992 Harry Vold
- 1991 Harry Vold
- 1990 Harry Vold
- 1989 Harry Vold
- 1988 Harry Vold
- 1987 Harry Vold
- 1986 Walt Alsbaugh
- 1985 Cotton Rosser
- 1984 Bob Barnes
- 1983 Mike Cervi
- 1982 Harry Vold

=== Bullfighter of the Year ===
- 2025 Cody Webster
- 2024 Cody Webster
- 2023 Cody Webster
- 2022 Cody Webster
- 2021 Cody Webster
- 2020 Cody Webster
- 2019 Dusty Tuckness
- 2018 Dusty Tuckness
- 2017 Dusty Tuckness
- 2016 Dusty Tuckness
- 2015 Dusty Tuckness
- 2014 Dusty Tuckness
- 2013 Dusty Tuckness
- 2012 Dusty Tuckness
- 2011 Dusty Tuckness
- 2010 Dusty Tuckness
- 2009 Cory Wall
- 2008 Darrell Diefenbach
- 2007 Joe Baumgartner
- 2006 Joe Baumgartner
- 2005 Joe Baumgartner
- 2004 Joe Baumgartner

=== World Champion Bullfighter (inactive) ===
- 2000 Mike Matt
- 1999 Lance Brittan
- 1998 Jerry Norton
- 1997 Mike Matt
- 1996 Mike Matt
- 1995 Ronny Sparks
- 1994 Rob Smets
- 1993 Ronny Sparks
- 1992 Ronny Sparks
- 1991 Loyd Ketchum
- 1990 Greg Rumohr
- 1989 Dwayne Hargo
- 1988 (tie) Rob Smets
- 1988 (tie) Miles Hare
- 1987 Mike Horton
- 1986 Rob Smets
- 1985 Rob Smets
- 1984 Rich Chatman
- 1983 Rob Smets
- 1982 Skipper Voss
- 1981 Miles Hare

=== Clown of the Year ===
- 2025 Matt Merritt
- 2024 John Harrison
- 2023 John Harrison
- 2022 John Harrison
- 2021 Justin Rumford
- 2020 Justin Rumford
- 2019 Justin Rumford
- 2018 Justin Rumford
- 2017 Justin Rumford
- 2016 Justin Rumford
- 2015 Justin Rumford
- 2014 Justin Rumford
- 2013 Justin Rumford
- 2012 Justin Rumford
- 2011 Keith Isley
- 2010 Keith Isley
- 2009 Keith Isley
- 2008 Keith Isley
- 2007 Keith Isley
- 2006 Keith Isley
- 2005 Flint Rasmussen
- 2004 Flint Rasmussen
- 2003 Flint Rasmussen
- 2002 Flint Rasmussen
- 2001 Flint Rasmussen
- 2000 Flint Rasmussen
- 1999 Flint Rasmussen
- 1998 Flint Rasmussen
- 1997 Butch Lehmkuhler
- 1996 Lecile Harris
- 1995 Lecile Harris
- 1994 Lecile Harris
- 1991 Butch Lehmkuhler
- 1990 Butch Lehmkuhler
- 1989 Butch Lehmkuhler
- 1988 Quail Dobbs
- 1987 Tom Feller
- 1986 Ted Kimzey
- 1985 Rex Dunn
- 1984 Rick Chatman
- 1983 Leon Coffee
- 1982 Wilbur Plaugher
- 1981 Tom Feller
- 1980 Rick Young
- 1979 Jon Taylor
- 1978 Quail Dobbs
- 1977 Chuck Henson

=== Coors Man in the Can ===
- 2025 John Harrison
- 2024 John Harrison
- 2023 John Harrison
- 2022 John Harrison
- 2021 John Harrison
- 2020 Keith Isley
- 2019 Johnny Dudley
- 2018 Justin Rumford
- 2017 John Harrison
- 2016 John Harrison
- 2015 Justin Rumford
- 2014 John Harrison
- 2013 Justin Rumford
- 2012 Keith Isley
- 2011 Keith Isley
- 2010 Keith Isley
- 2009 Keith Isley
- 2008 Troy Lerwill
- 2007 Troy Lerwill
- 2006 Keith Isley
- 2005 Flint Rasmussen
- 2004 Flint Rasmussen
- 2003 Flint Rasmussen
- 2002 Flint Rasmussen
- 2001 Flint Rasmussen
- 2000 Rudy Burns
- 1999 Flint Rasmussen
- 1998 Flint Rasmussen
- 1997 Rick Young
- 1996 Rick Young
- 1995 Rudy Burns
- 1994 Rick Young
- 1993 Quail Dobbs
- 1992 Butch Lehmkulher
- 1991 Rick Young
- 1990 Quail Dobbs
- 1989 Butch Lehmkulher
- 1988 J.G. Crouch
- 1987 Tom Feller
- 1986 Quail Dobbs
- 1985 Quail Dobbs
- 1984 Tom Feller

=== Announcer of the Year ===
- 2025 Anthony Lucia
- 2024 Anthony Lucia
- 2023 Anthony Lucia
- 2022 Garrett Yerigan
- 2021 Garrett Yerigan
- 2020 Bob Tallman
- 2019 Bob Tallman
- 2018 Bob Tallman
- 2017 Bob Tallman
- 2016 Wayne Brooks
- 2015 Randy Corley
- 2014 Wayne Brooks
- 2013 Wayne Brooks
- 2012 Boyd Polhamus
- 2011 Randy Corley
- 2010 Wayne Brooks
- 2009 Boyd Polhamus
- 2008 Boyd Polhamus
- 2007 Boyd Polhamus
- 2006 Bob Tallman
- 2005 Wayne Brooks
- 2004 Bob Tallman
- 2003 Randy Corley
- 2002 Hadley Barrett
- 2001 Bob Tallman
- 2000 Bob Tallman
- 1999 Bob Tallman
- 1998 Randy Corley
- 1997 Bob Tallman
- 1996 Randy Corley
- 1995 Randy Corley
- 1994 Randy Corley
- 1993 Randy Corley
- 1992 Randy Corley
- 1991 Randy Corley
- 1990 Randy Corley
- 1989 Hadley Barrett
- 1988 S.J. "Zoop" Dove
- 1987 Bob Tallman
- 1986 Clem McSpadden
- 1985 Hadley Barrett
- 1984 Randy Corley
- 1983 Hadley Barrett
- 1982 Bob Tallman

=== Pickup Man of the Year ===
- 2025 Shawn Calhoun
- 2024 Shawn Calhoun
- 2023 Josh Edwards
- 2022 Matt Twitchell
- 2021 Matt Twitchell
- 2020 Rex Bugbee
- 2019 Matt Twitchell
- 2018 Chase Cervi
- 2017 Gary Rempel
- 2016 Chase Cervi
- 2015 Matt Twitchell

Source: PRCA Awards, Contract Personnel - Pickup Man of the Year, p. 20.

=== Timer of the Year ===
- 2025 Molly Twitchell
- 2024 Molly Twitchell
- 2023 Molly Twitchell
- 2022 Molly Twitchell
- 2021 Molly Twitchell and Michelle Corley (tie)
- 2020 Brenda Crowder
- 2019 Shawna Ray
- 2018 Kim Sutton

=== Music Director of the Year ===
- 2025 Josh Hilton
- 2024 Bradley Narducci
- 2023 Josh Hilton
- 2022 Benje Bendele
- 2021 Jill Franzen Loden
- 2020 Jill Franzen Loden
- 2019 Josh (Hambone) Hilton
- 2018 Jill Franzen Loden
- 2017 Josh (Hambone) Hilton

=== Secretary of the Year ===
- 2025 Eva Chadwick
- 2024 Eva Chadwick
- 2023 Eva Chadwick
- 2022 Eva Chadwick
- 2021 Brenda Crowder
- 2020 Sunni Deb Backstrom
- 2019 Brenda Crowder
- 2018 Sandy Gwatney
- 2017 Amanda Corley-Sanders
- 2016 Sandy Gwatney
- 2015 Linda Alsbaugh
- 2014 Haley Schneeberger
- 2013 Haley Schneeberger
- 2012 Haley Schneeberger
- 2011 Haley Schneeberger
- 2010 Haley Schneeberger
- 2009 Haley Schneeberger
- 2008 Haley Schneeberger
- 2007 Haley Schneeberger
- 2006 Mildred Farris
- 2005 Sunni Deb Backstrome
- 2004 Mildred Farris
- 2003 Sunni Deb Backstrome
- 2002 Mildred Klingermann
- 2001 Mildred Farris
- 2000 Mildred Farris
- 1999 Mildred Farris
- 1998 Sunni Deb Backstrom
- 1997 Vickie Shireman
- 1996 Sunni Deb Backstrome
- 1995 Sunni Deb Backstrome
- 1994 Sunni Deb Backstrome
- 1993 Sunni Deb Backstrome
- 1992 Sunni Deb Backstrome
- 1991 Sunni Deb Backstrome
- 1990 Sunni Deb Backstrome
- 1989 Mildred Farris
- 1988 Mildred Farris
- 1987 Mildred Farris
- 1986 Mildred Farris
- 1985 Cindy Moreno

=== Specialty Act of the Year ===
- 2025 Bobby Kerr (dress)
- 2025 John Harrison (comedy)
- 2024 Bobby Kerr (dress)
- 2024 John Harrison (comedy)
- 2023 Bobby Kerr (dress)
- 2023 John Harrison (comedy)
- 2022 Bobby Kerr (dress)
- 2022 John Harrison (comedy)
- 2021 Bobby Kerr (dress)
- 2021 John Harrison (comedy)
- 2020 Rider Kiesner and Benthany Iles (dress)
- 2020 John Harrison (comedy)
- 2019 Bobby Kerr (dress)
- 2019 Justin Rumford (comedy)
- 2018 Tomas Garcilazo (dress)
- 2018 Cody Sosebee (comedy)
- 2017 Bobby Kerr (dress)
- 2017 Gizmo McCracken (comedy)
- 2016 John, Lynn and Amanda Payne (dress)
- 2016 John Harrison (comedy)
- 2015 John Payne and Amanda Payne (dress)
- 2015 John Harrison (comedy)
- 2014 John Payne and Amanda Payne (dress)
- 2014 John Harrison (comedy)
- 2013 Tomas Garcilazo (dress)
- 2013 Keith Isley (comedy)
- 2012 Tomas Garcilazo (dress)
- 2012 John Harrison (comedy)
- 2011 John Payne (dress)
- 2011 Keith Isley (comedy)
- 2010 John Payne (dress)
- 2010 Keith Isley (comedy)
- 2009 John Payne (dress)
- 2009 Keith Isley (comedy)
- 2008 John Payne (dress)
- 2008 Troy Lerwill (comedy)
- 2007 Tomas Garcilazo (dress)
- 2007 Troy Lerwill (comedy)
- 2006 Keith Isley (dress)
- 2006 Troy Lerwill (comedy)
- 2005 Tommy Lucia (dress)
- 2005 Troy Lerwill (comedy)
- 2004 Tommy Lucia (dress)
- 2004 Keith Isley (comedy)
- 2003 Tommy Lucia (dress)
- 2003 Troy Lerwill (comedy)
- 2002 Keith Isley (dress)
- 2002 Troy Lerwill (comedy)
- 2001 Keith Isley
- 2000 Keith Isley
- 1999 Keith Isley
- 1998 Jerry Diaz
- 1997 Leon and Vicki Adams
- 1996 John Payne
- 1995 John Payne
- 1994 John Payne
- 1993 John Payne
- 1992 John Payne
- 1991 John Payne
- 1990 John Payne
- 1989 John Payne
- 1988 Jerry Wayne and Judy Olson
- 1987 Leon and Vicki Adams
- 1986 J.W. Stoker
- 1985 J.W. Stoker
- 1984 Vicki Adams
- 1983 Jerry Olson
- 1982 Leon Adams

=== Donita Barnes Contract Personnel Lifetime Achievement Award ===
- 2026 John Barnes
- 2025 Tommy Joe Lucia
- 2024 Edie Longfellow
- 2023 Scott Walton
- 2022 Bronc Rumford
- 2021 Kay Gay
- 2020 Cindy Rosser
- 2019 Roy & Virginia Honeycutt
- 2018 Hadley Barrett
- 2017 Jim and Julie Sutton
- 2016 Karen Vold
- 2015 Cotton Rosser
- 2014 Quail Dobbs
- 2013 Fred and Norma Korenkamp
- 2012 Art and Linda Alsbaugh
- 2011 Donita Barnes

=== Veterinarian of the Year ===
Year	Name	City	State
2026	Dr. James A. Justice	Hobbs	New Mexico
2025	Dr. Leslie Schur	Las Vegas	Nevada
2024	Dr. Gregg Knape	Alvin	Texas
2023	Dr. Tim Eastman	Salinas	California
2022	Dr. Gregg Veneklasen	Canyon	Texas
2021	Dr. Benjamin Espy	San Antonio	Texas
2020	No recipient this year		
2019	Dr. Eddie Taylor	Tucson	Arizona
2018	Dr. Charles Graham	Austin	Texas
2017	Dr. Jerry Billquist	Boerne	Texas
2016	Dr. Marty Tanner	Elgin	Texas
2015	Dr. John Boyington	Phillipsburg	Kansas
2014	Dr. Fred Rule	Elk City	Oklahoma
2013	Dr. Joe Coli	Reno	Nevada
2012	Dr. Jake Wells	San Antonio	Texas
2011	Dr. Garth Lamb	Las Vegas	Nevada
2010	Dr. Bill Anderson	Fort Worth	Texas

=== Linderman Award ===
Year	Name	City	State	
2026	Caleb McMillan	Soap Lake	Washington	
2025	Darcy Kersh	Charters Towers	Queensland	Australia
2024	Caleb McMillan	Soap Lake	Washington	
2023	Josh Frost	Randlett	Utah	
2022	Josh Frost	Randlett	Utah	
2021	Josh Frost	Randlett	Utah	
2020	(no contestant qualified)	-	-	-
2019	Josh Frost	Roosevelt	Utah	
2018	Kyle Whitaker	Chambers	Nebraska	
2017	Kyle Whitaker	Chambers	Nebraska	
2016	Kyle Whitaker	Chambers	Nebraska	
2015	Kyle Whitaker	Chambers	Nebraska	
2014	Joe Frost	Randlett	Utah	
2013	Trell Etbauer	Goodwell	Oklahoma	
2012	Kyle Thomson	Lundbreck	Alberta	Canada
2011	Kyle Whitaker	Chambers	Nebraska	
2010	Trell Etbauer	Goodwell	Oklahoma	
2009	Trell Etbauer	Goodwell	Oklahoma	
2008	Trell Etbauer	Goodwell	Oklahoma	
2007	Mike Outhier	Utopia	Texas	
2006	Kyle Whitaker	Chambers	Nebraska	
2005	Kyle Whitaker	Chambers	Nebraska	
2004	Mike Outhier	Utopia	Texas	
2003	Kyle Whitaker	Chambers	Nebraska	
2002	Dan Erickson	La Junta	Colorado	
2001	Jesse Bail	Camp Cook	South Dakota	
2000	Jesse Bail	Camp Cook	South Dakota	
1999	Dan Erickson	La Junta	Colorado	
1998	Kyle Whitaker	Chambers	Nebraska	
1997	Kyle Whitaker	Chambers	Nebraska	
1996	(no contestant qualified)			
1995	Chuck Kite	Montfort	Wisconsin	
1994	(no contestant qualified)			
1993	Casey Minton	Redwood Valley	California	
1992	Bernie Smyth, Jr.	Crossfield	Alberta	Canada
1991	Lewis Feild	Elk Ridge	Utah	
1990	Bernie Smyth, Jr.	Crossfield	Alberta	Canada
1989	Phillip Haugen	Willston	North Dakota	
1988	Lewis Feild	Elk Ridge	Utah	
1987	Tom Elrikson	Priddis	Alberta	Canada
1986	Bob Schall	Arlee	Montana	
1985	Tom Elrikson	Innisfail	Alberta	Canada
1984	Marty Melvin	Holabird	South Dakota	
1983	Marty Melvin	Holabird	South Dakota	
1982	Tom Elrikson	Innisfail	Alberta	Canada
1981	Lewis Feild	Peoa	Utah	
1980	Steve Bland	Trent	Texas	
1979	Chip Whitaker	Chambers	Nebraska	
1978	Chip Whitaker	Chambers	Nebraska	
1977	Chip Whitaker	Chambers	Nebraska	
1976	Phil Lyne	Artesia Wells	Texas	
1975	Chip Whitaker	Chambers	Nebraska	
1974	Bob Blandford	San Antonio	Texas	
1973	Bob Blandford	San Antonio	Texas	
1972	Phil Lyne	George West	Texas	
1971	Phil Lyne	George West	Texas	
1970	Phil Lyne	George West	Texas	
1969	Kenny McLean	Okanagan Falls	British Columbia	Canada
1968	Paul Mayo	Grinnell	Iowa	
1967	Kenny McLean	Okanagan Falls	British Columbia	Canada
1966	Benny Reynolds	Melrose	Montana	

=== Remuda Award for Best Stock Contractor ===
Brought best pen of bucking horses

- 2026 Championship Pro Rodeo
- 2025 Brookman Rodeo
- 2024 Pickett Pro Rodeo
- 2023 Burch Rodeo
- 2022 J Bar J
- 2021 Calgary Stampede
- 2020 Summit Pro Rodeo
- 2019 Powder River Rodeo
- 2018 Sankey Pro Rodeo and Robinson Bulls
- 2017 Korkow Rodeo
- 2016 Frontier Rodeo
- 2015 Three Hills Rodeo
- 2014 J Bar J
- 2013 Harry Vold Rodeo
- 2012 Frontier Rodeo
- 2011 Bar T Rodeo
- 2010 J Bar J
- 2009 Calgary Stampede
- 2008 John Growney
- 2007 Beutler & Son Rodeo
- 2006 Bud Kerby
- 2005 Stace Smith
- 2004 Stace Smith

=== Remuda Award for Best Rodeo Committee ===
Assembled best pen of bucking horses

Year	Rodeo	City	State	Country	Ref
2026	Caldwell Night Rodeo	Caldwell	Idaho	United States	
2025	Cheyenne Frontier Days	Cheyenne	Wyoming	United States	
2024	Black Hills Roundup	Belle Fourche	South Dakota	United States	
2023	Douglas County Fair & Rodeo	Castle Rock	Colorado	United States	
2022	Fort Worth Stock Show & Rodeo	Fort Worth	Texas	United States	
2021	Red Bluff Round-Up	Red Bluff	California	United States	
2020	Ute Stampede Rodeo	Nephi	Utah	United States	
2019	St. Paul Rodeo	St. Paul	Oregon	United States	
2018	Gooding Pro Rodeo	Gooding	Idaho	United States	
2017	Horse Heaven Round-Up	Kennewick	Washington	United States	
2016	Spanish Fork Fiesta Days Rodeo	Spanish Fork	Utah	United States	
2015	Pendleton Round-Up	Pendleton	Oregon	United States	
2014	Farm-City Pro Rodeo	Hermiston	Oregon	United States	
2013	Canby Stampede	Canby	Oregon	United States	
2012	Ponoka Stampede	Ponoka	Alberta	Canada	
2011	American Royal	Kansas City	Missouri	United States	
2010	San Antonio Stock Show & Rodeo	San Antonio	Texas	United States	
2009	Farm-City Pro Rodeo	Hermiston	Oregon	United States	
2008	Kitsap County Fair and Stampede	Bremerton	Washington	United States	
2007	RodeoHouston	Houston	Texas	United States	
2006	Keith Martin and the San Antonio Stock Sale and Rodeo	San Antonio	Texas	United States	
2005	Keith Martin and the San Antonio Stock Sale & Rodeo	San Antonio	Texas	United States	

== Rookie of the Year Awards ==
=== Overall Rookie of the Year ===
- 2010 was the last year the PRCA named an Overall Rookie of the Year
- 2010 Dylan Werner, Bushnell, Florida
- 2009 Kaleb Driggers, Albany Georgia*
- 2008 Tuf Cooper, Decatur, Texas*
- 2007 Brad Pierce, Snyder, Texas
- 2006 Cody James, Monticello, Arkansas
- 2005 Steve Woolsey, Spanish Fork, Utah
- 2004 Clayton Foltyn, El Campo, Texas
- 2003 Matt Austin, Wills Point, Texas*
- 2002 Will Lowe, Gardner, Kansas*
- 2001 Matt Robertson, Augusta, Montana
- 2000 Luke Branquinho, Los Alamos, California*
- 1999 Cash Myers, Athens, Texas
- 1998 Danell Tipton, Spencer, Oklahoma
- 1997 Mike White, Lake Charles, Louisiana*
- 1996 Shane Slack, Idabel, Oklahoma
- 1995 Curt Lyons, Ardmore, Oklahoma
- 1994 Cody Ohl, Orchard, Texas*
- 1993 Blair Burk, Durant, Oklahoma
- 1992 Rope Myers, Athens, Texas
- 1991 Brent Lewis, Pinon, New Mexico
- 1990 Fred Whitfield, Cypress, Texas*
- 1989 David Bailey, Tahlequah, Oklahoma
- 1988 Ty Murray, Odessa, Texas*
- 1987 Tony Currin, Heppner, Oregon
- 1986 Jim Sharp, Kermit, Texas*
- 1985 Joe Beaver, Victoria, Texas*
- 1984 Sam Poutous, Julian, California
- 1983 Jacky Gibbs, Ivanhoe, Texas
- 1982 Clark Hankins, Rocksprings, Texas
- 1981 John W. Jones Jr., Morro Bay, California
- 1980 Jimmie Cooper, Monument, New Mexico*
- 1979 Jerry Jetton, Stephenville, Texas
- 1978 Dee Pickett, Caldwell, Idaho*
- 1977 Jimmy Cleveland, Hollis, Oklahoma
- 1976 Roy Cooper, Durant, Oklahoma*
- 1975 Don Smith, Kiowa, Oklahoma
- 1974 Lee Phillips, Carseland, Alberta, Canada
- 1973 Bob Blandford, San Antonio, Texas
- 1972 Dave Brock, Goodland, Kansas*
- 1971 Kent Youngblood, Lamesa, Texas
- 1970 Dick Aronson, Tempe, Arizona
- 1969 Phil Lyne, George West, Texas*
- 1968 Bowie Wesley, Wildorado, Texas
- 1967 Jay Himes, Beulah, Colorado
- 1966 Tony Haberer, Muleshoe, Texas
- 1965 Dan Willis, Aquilla, Texas
- 1964 Jim Steen, Glenn's Ferry, Idaho
- 1963 Bill Kornell, Salmon, Idaho
- 1962 Jim Houston, Omaha, Nebraska*
- 1961 Kenny McLean, Okanagan Falls, British Columbia, Canada*
- 1960 Larry Kane, Big Sandy, Montana
- 1959 Harry Charters, Melba, Idaho*
- 1958 Benny Reynolds, Melrose, Montana*
- 1957 Bob A. Robinson, Tuttle, Idaho*
- 1956 John W. Jones Sr., San Luis Obispo, California*

Source: *later became a world champion

=== All-Around Rookie of the Year ===
- 2026 Ketch Kelton, Mayer, Arizona
- 2025 Riley O'Rourke, Skiatook, Oklahoma
- 2024 Cooper James, Erda, Utah
- 2023 Dylan Hancock, San Angelo, Texas
- 2022 Riley Webb, Denton, Texas*
- 2021 Slade Wood, New Ulm, Texas
- 2020 Britt Smith, Broken Bow, Oklahoma
- 2019 Stetson Wright, Milford, Utah*
- 2018 Tanner Green, Cotulla, Texas
- 2017 Nelson Wyatt, Clanton, Alabama
- 2016 Taylor Santos, Creston, California
- 2015 Jace Melvin, Fort Pierre, South Dakota
- 2014 Billy Bob Brown, Stephenville, Texas
- 2013 Caleb Smidt, Yorktown, Texas*
- 2012 Dakota Eldridge, Elko, Nevada
- 2011 Chris Selfors, Minot, North Dakota
- 2010 Ace Slone, Cuero, Texas
- 2009 Chad Bouchard, Rolling Hills, Alberta, Canada
- 2008 Trell Etbauer, Goodwell, Oklahoma
- 2007 Brad Pierce, Snyder, Texas
- 2006 Steven Dent, Mullen, Nebraska
- 2005 Steve Woolsey, Spanish Fork, Utah
- 2004 Clayton Foltyn, El Campo, Texas
- 2003 Clint Robinson, Farmington, Utah
- 2002 Bobby Harter, Aledo, Texas
- 2001 Matt Robertson, Augusta, Montana
- 2000 Kyle Hughes, Model, Colorado
- 1999 Cash Myers, Athens, Texas
- 1996-1998 **
- 1995 Bubba Paschal, LaPorte, Texas
- 1994 Marty Becker, Manyberries, Alberta, Canada
- 1991-1993 **
- 1990 Dan Mortensen, Billings, Montana*

Source: *later became a world champion **no All-Around Rookie was named for there is no record thereof

=== Bareback Riding Rookie of the Year ===
- 2026 Carson Hildre, Velva, North Dakota
- 2025 Sage Allen, Blackfoot, Idaho
- 2024 Weston Timberman, Columbus, Montana
- 2023 Keenan Hayes, Hayden, Colorado*
- 2022 Rocker Steiner, Weatherford, Texas*
- 2021 Cole Franks, Clarendon, Texas
- 2020 Cole Reiner, Kaycee, Wyoming
- 2019 Garrett Shadbolt, Merriman, Nebraska
- 2018 Zach Hibler, Wheeler, Texas
- 2017 Tanner Phipps, Dalton, Georgia
- 2016 Clayton Biglow, Clements, California*
- 2015 Wyatt Denny, Minden, Nebraska
- 2014 Kody Lamb, Sherwood Park, Alberta, Canada
- 2013 Tim O'Connell, Zwingle, Iowa*
- 2012 Austin Foss, Terrebonne, Oregon
- 2011 J.R. Vezain, Cowley, Wyoming
- 2010 Ty Breuer, Mandan, North Dakota
- 2009 Steven Peebles, Redmond, Oregon*
- 2008 Jared Smith, Ranger, Texas
- 2007 Tilden Hooper, Carthaeg, Texas
- 2006 Steven Dent, Mullen, Nebraska
- 2005 Justin McDaniel, Porum, Oklahoma*
- 2004 Dusty LaValley, Debolt, Alberta, Canada
- 2003 Clint Cannon, Waller, Texas
- 2002 Will Lowe, Gardner, Kansas*
- 2001 Tyson Thompson, Templeton, California
- 2000 Billy Griffin, Raytown, Missouri
- 1999 J.D. Garrett Jr., Newell, South Dakota
- 1998 Kenton Randle, Fort Vermillion, Alberta, Canada
- 1997 Scott Montague, Fruitdale, South Dakota
- 1996 Dusty McCollister, Acworth, Georgia
- 1995 Davey Shields Jr., Hanna, Alberta, Canada
- 1994 Mark Gomes, Florence, Arizona*
- 1993 Jason Jackson, Nespelem, Washington
- 1992 Beau Mayo, Dublin, Texas
- 1991 Vern Millen, Rapid City, South Dakota
- 1990 Jack Sims, Hutchinson, Kansas
- 1989 D.J. Johnson, Hutchinson, Kansas
- 1988 Ty Murray, Odessa, Texas*
- 1987 Ken Lensegrav, Meadow, South Dakota
- 1986 Colin Murnion, Jordan, Montana
- 1985 Tom Henrie, Mesquite, Nevada
- 1984 Marvin Garrett, Belle Fourche, South Dakota*
- 1983 Stephen Smith, Hollywood, California
- 1982 Steve Carter, Klamath Falls, Oregon
- 1981 Brent Larreau, Denver, Colorado
- 1980 Lewis Feild, Peoa, Utah*
- 1979 Chuck Logue, New Braunfels, Texas*
- 1978 Brian Jacobson, Glenbush, Saskatchewan, Canada
- 1977 Jimmy Cleveland, Hollis, Oklahoma

Source: *later became a world champion

=== Steer Wrestling Rookie of the Year ===
- 2026 Colin Fox, Manvel, Texas
- 2025 Traver Johnson, Eltopia, Washington
- 2024 Ty Bauerle, Jourdanton, Texas
- 2023 Cash Robb, Altamont, Utah
- 2022 Landris White, Angleton, Texas
- 2021 Marc Joiner, Loranger, Louisiana
- 2020 Gabe Soileau, Lake Charles, Louisiana
- 2019 Dennell Henderson, Huntsville, Texas
- 2018 Brendan Laye, Consort, Alberta, Canada
- 2017 Jesse Brown, Baker City, Oregon
- 2016 Stephen Culling, Fort St. John, British Columbia, Canada
- 2015 J.D. Struxness, Appleton, Wisconsin*
- 2014 Rowdy Parrott, Bellville, Texas
- 2013 Jason Thomas, Benton, Arkansas
- 2012 Dakota Eldrige, Elko, Nevada
- 2011 Ty Erickson, Helena, Montana*
- 2010 Cody Moore, Artesia, New Mexico
- 2009 Chad Bouchard, Rolling Hills, New Mexico
- 2008 Zack Cobb, Pampa, Texas
- 2007 Parker Howell, Stillwell, Oklahoma
- 2006 Daniel Yates, Red Lodge, Montana
- 2005 Seth Brockman, Wheatland, Wyoming
- 2004 Ryan Jarrett, Summerville, Georgia*
- 2003 Baillie Milan, Cochrane, Alberta, Canada
- 2002 Kenny Coppini, Ferndale, California
- 2001 Josh Lessman, Sidney, Nebraska
- 2000 Luke Branquinho, Los Alamos, California*
- 1999 Cash Myers, Athens, Texas
- 1998 Tyler Woodland, Weiser, Idaho
- 1997 Chad Biesemeyer, Martin, Texas
- 1996 Teddy Johnson, Checotah, Oklahoma*
- 1995 Bubba Paschal, LaPorta, Texas
- 1994 Brad Morgan, Hugo, Oklahoma
- 1993 Brett Zieffle, Consort, Alberta, Canada
- 1992 Rope Myers, Athens, Texas*
- 1991 Thad Olson, Prairie City, South Dakota
- 1990 Coty Batles, Detroit, Texas
- 1989 Shawn Wharton, Mineral Wells, Texas
- 1988 Mike Smith, Lake Charles, Louisiana*
- 1987 Tony Currin, Heppner, Oregon
- 1986 Phillip Munnerlyn, Seagoville, Texas
- 1985 Steve Duhon, Opelousas, Louisiana*
- 1984 Tom Switzer, San Louis Obispo, California
- 1983 Doug Houston, Tucson, Arizona
- 1982 Lance Robinson, Spanish Fork, Utah
- 1981 Gary Green, Keithville, Louisiana
- 1980 Jimmie Cooper, Monument, New Mexico
- 1979 Leonard Fluitt, Uvalde, Texas
- 1978 Dudley Little, San Ardo, California
- 1977 Steve Bland, Trent, Texas

Source: *later became a world champion

=== Team Roping Rookie of the Year ===
- 2026 Ketch Kelton (header), Mayer, Arizona
- 2026 Braylon Tryan (heeler), Lipan, Texas
- 2025 James Arviso (header), Seba Dalkai, Arizona
- 2025 Nicky Northcott (heeler), Stephenville, Texas
- 2024 Tyler Tryan (header), Lipan, Texas
- 2024 Logan Moore (heeler), Dublin, Texas
- 2023 Cole Thomas (header), Meadville, Mississippi
- 2023 Kaden Profili (heeler), Jacksonville, Texas
- 2022 Tanner James (header), Porterville, California
- 2022 Junior Zambrano (heeler), Nogales, Arizona
- 2021 John Gaona (header), Winkleman, Arizona
- 2021 Caleb Hendrix (heeler), Fallon, Nevada
- 2020 Tanner Tomlinson (header), Angleton, Texas
- 2020 Clay Futrell (heeler), Union Grove, North Carolina
- 2019 Kal Fuller (header), Bozeman, Montana
- 2019 Paden Bray (heeler), Stephenville, Texas
- 2018 Jeff Flenniken (header), Caldwell, Idaho
- 2018 Ross Ashford (heeler), Lott, Texas
- 2017 Nelson Wyatt (header), Clanton, Alabama
- 2017 Cody Hogan (heeler), Athens, Texas
- 2016 Dustin Egusquiza (header), Mariana, Florida
- 2016 Dalton Pearce (heeler), San Luis Obispo, California
- 2015 Cody Snow (header), Los Olivos, California
- 2015 Quinn Kesler (heeler), Holden, Utah
- 2014 Rhett Anderson (header), Anabella, Utah
- 2014 Junior Nogueira (heeler), Scottsdale, Arizona*
- 2013 Chace Thompson (header), Munday, Texas
- 2013 Will Woodfin (heeler), Marshall, Texas
- 2012 Tyler Wade (header), Terrell, Texas*
- 2012 Clint Summers (heeler), Lake City, Florida
- 2011 Joshua Torres (header), Bell City, Louisiana
- 2011 Dakota Kirchenschlager (heeler), DeLeon, Texas
- 2010 Kaden Richard (header), Roosevelt, Utah
- 2010 Matt Garza (heeler), Las Cruces, New Mexico
- 2009 Kaleb Driggers (header), Albany, Georgia*
- 2009 Justin Hendrick (heeler), Rosenberg, Texas
- 2008 Joel Bach (header), Milsap, Texas
- 2008 Rhen Richard (heeler), Roosevelt, Utah
- 2007 Justin Young (header), Altha, Florida
- 2007 Broc Cresta (heeler), Santa Rosa, California
- 2006 Keven Daniel (header), Altha, Florida
- 2006 Jade Corkill (heeler), Fallon, Nevada*
- 2005 Brandon Beers (header), Powell Butte, Oregon
- 2005 Douglass Gillespie (heeler), Arrowhead, Alberta, Canada
- 2004 Jake Cooper (header), Monument, New Mexico
- 2004 Jim Ross Cooper (heeler), Stephenville, Texas
- 2003 Jason Adams (header), Logandale, Nevada
- 2003 Patrick Smith (heeler), Midland, Texas*
- 2002 Travis Gallais (header), Olds, Alberta, Canada
- 2002 Randon Adams (heeler), Logandale, Nevada*
- 2001 Reese Ker (header), Cotulla, Texas
- 2001 Matt Robertson (heeler), Augusta, Montana
- 2000 Nick Sartain (header), Yukon, Oklahoma*
- 2000 Trey Johnson (heeler), Lovington, New Mexico
- 1999 Ty Thomas (header), Idabel, Oklahoma
- 1999 Craig Branham (heeler), Canyon Country, California
- 1998 Charly Crawford (header), Canby, Oregon
- 1998 John Paul Lucero (heeler), Villanueva, New Mexico
- 1997 Kit Sherwood (header), Snowflake, Arizona
- 1997 Kyle Lockett (heeler), Ivanhoe, California
- 1996 Scooter Nolen Jr. (header), Whitesboro, Texas
- 1996 Mickey Gomez (heeler), Salado, Texas
- 1995 Shad Chadwick, Mesa, Arizona
- 1994 Brye Sayer, Phoenix, Arizona
- 1993 Nick Sarchett, Scottsdale, Arizona
- 1992 Britt Bockius, Dewey, Oklahoma
- 1991 Martin Lucero, Villa Nueva, New Mexico
- 1990 Liddon Cowden, Merced, California
- 1989 Andy Anaya, Tucson, Arizona
- 1988 Flynn Farris, Dalhart, Texas
- 1987 Charles Pogue, Ringling, Oklahoma
- 1986 Dennis Gatz, Oakdale, California
- 1985 Jerry Buckles, Scottsbluff, Nebraska
- 1984 William "Rusty" Wright, Mount Pleasant, Texas
- 1983 Joel Maker, Poeau, Oklahoma
- 1982 Mike Fuller, Clarkston, Washington
- 1982 Chris Henderson, Coulee City, Washington
- 1981 Bret Beach, Gilbert, Arizona
- 1980 Tee Woolman, Llano, Texas*
- 1979 Bill E. Parker, Billings, Montana
- 1978 Brian Burrows, Reedley, California
- 1977 Brian Murphy, Paradise Valley, California

Source: *later became a world champion

=== Saddle Bronc Riding Rookie of the Year ===
- 2026 Waitley Sharon, Ordway, Colorado
- 2025 Gus Gaillard, Morse, Texas
- 2024 Zachary Dallas, Las Cruces, New Mexico
- 2023 Ryder Sanford, Sulphur, Louisiana
- 2022 Damian Brennan, Injune, Queensland, Australia
- 2021 K's Thompson, Lundbreck, Alberta, Canada
- 2020 Riggin Smith, Winterset, Iowa
- 2019 Stetson Wright, Milford, Utah*
- 2018 Dawson Hay, Wildwood, Alberta, Canada
- 2017 Shade Etbauer, Goodwell, Oklahoma
- 2016 Ryder Wright, Milford, Utah*
- 2015 CoBurn Bradshaw, Beaver, Utah
- 2014 Rusty Wright, Milford, Utah
- 2013 Ty Kirkland, Lufkin, Texas
- 2012 Spencer Wright, Milford, Utah*
- 2011 Sterling Crawley, College Station, Texas
- 2010 Troy Crowser, Whitewood, South Dakota
- 2009 Jesse Wright, Milford, Utah*
- 2008 Kaleb Asay, Powell, Wyoming
- 2007 Jesse Kruse, Great Falls, Montana*
- 2006 Tyler Corrington, Hastings, Minnesota
- 2005 Todd Herzog, Penhold, Alberta, Canada
- 2004 Matt Hebbert, Hyannis, Nebraska
- 2003 Sam Spreadborough, Snyder, Texas
- 2002 Mo Forbes, Kaycee, Wyoming
- 2001 Billy Richards, Cochrane, Alberta, Canada
- 2000 Cody Martin, Hatfield, Arkansas
- 1999 Rance Bray, Texhoma, Oklahoma
- 1998 Mike Outhier, Weatherford, Oklahoma
- 1997 T.C. Holloway, Eagle Butte, South Dakota
- 1996 Scott Johnson, Booral, New South Wales, Australia
- 1995 J.T. Hitch, Stilesville, Indiana
- 1994 Glen O'Neill, Strathmore, Alberta, Canada*
- 1993 Kelly Palmer, Stigler, Oklahoma
- 1992 Kenny Taton, Mud Butte, South Oklahoma
- 1991 Toby Adams, Red Bluff, California
- 1990 Dan Mortensen, Billings, Montana*
- 1989 Rod Hay, Mayerthorpe, Alberta, Canada
- 1988 Craig Latham, Kaycee, Wyoming
- 1987 Kyle Wemple, Milford, California
- 1986 Tom Wagoner, Buffalo, Wyoming
- 1985 Robert Etbauer, Goodwell, Oklahoma*
- 1984 Guy Shapka, Spruce View, Alberta, Canada
- 1983 Terry Carlon, Lawen, Oregon
- 1982 Kip Farnsworth, Anderson, California
- 1981 Rich Thomas, Pendleton, Oregon
- 1980 Brad Gjermundson, Marshall, North Dakota*
- 1979 Charlie Atwell, Huntersville, North Carolina
- 1978 Bud Pauley, Miles City, Montana
- 1977 Jim Bode Scott, Billings, Montana

Source: *later became a world champion

=== Tie-Down Roping Rookie of the Year ===
- 2026 Kyan Wilhite, Clovis, New Mexico
- 2025 Buck Calhoun, Richards, Texas
- 2024 Cole Clemons, Okeechobee, Florida
- 2023 Dylan Hancock, San Angelo, Texas
- 2022 Riley Webb, Denton, Texas*
- 2021 Beau Cooper, Stettler, Alberta, Canada
- 2020 Luke Potter, Maple City, Kansas
- 2019 Haven Meged, Miles, Montana*
- 2018 Ty Harris, San Angelo, Texas
- 2017 Tyler Milligan, Pawhuska, Oklahoma
- 2016 Westyn Hughes, Caldwell, Texas
- 2015 Trey Young, Dupree, South Dakota
- 2014 John "Catfish" Brown, Collinsville, Texas
- 2013 Caleb Smidt, Yorktown, Texas*
- 2012 Reese Riemer, Stinnett, Texas
- 2011 Jud Nowotny, LaVernia, Texas
- 2010 Ace Slone, Cuero, Texas
- 2009 Shane Hanchey, Sulphur, Louisiana*
- 2008 Tuf Cooper, Decatur, Texas*
- 2007 Sterling Smith, Stephenville, Texas
- 2006 Cody James, Monticello, Arkansas
- 2005 Jerrad Hofstetter, Athens, Texas
- 2004 Caddo Lewallen, Morrison, Oklahoma
- 2003 Clint Robinson, Farmington, Utah
- 2002 Scott Kormos, Mexia, Texas
- 2001 Brady Brock, Springtown, Texas
- 2000 Kyle Hughes, Model, Colorado
- 1999 Josh Crow, Lovington, New Mexico
- 1998 Chance Tinney, Winnsboro, Texas
- 1997 Clay Cerny, Eagle Lake, Texas
- 1996 Shane Slack, Idabel, Oklahoma
- 1995 Chad Johnson, Cut Bank, Montana
- 1994 Cody Ohl, Orchard, Texas*
- 1993 Blair Burk, Durant, Oklahoma
- 1992 Marty Lindner, Giddings, Texas
- 1991 Brent Lewis, Pinon, New Mexico
- 1990 Fred Whitfield, Cypress, Texas*
- 1989 Morris Ledford, Comanche, Oklahoma
- 1988 David Felton, Weatherford, Texas
- 1987 Ricky Canton, Houston, Texas
- 1986 David Bowen, Yoakum, Texas
- 1985 Joe Beaver, Victoria, Texas*
- 1984 Harold "Puddin" Payne, Stillwater, Oklahoma
- 1983 James Zant, Harper, Texas
- 1982 Clark Hankins, Rocksprings, Texas
- 1981 Jim Light, Santo, Texas
- 1980 Jimmie Cooper, Monument, New Mexico*
- 1979 Jerry Jetton, Stephenville, Texas
- 1978 Dee Pickett, Caldwell, Idaho*

Source: *later became a world champion

=== Bull Riding Rookie of the Year ===
- 2026 TBD
- 2025 Bryce Jensen, Huntsville, Texas
- 2024 Cooper James, Erda, Utah
- 2023 Tristin Parker, Winnie, Texas
- 2022 Lukasey Morris, Union City, Oklahoma
- 2021 Creek Young, Springfield, Missouri
- 2020 Colten Fritzlan, Rifle, Colorado
- 2019 Stetson Wright, Milford, Utah*
- 2018 Clayton Sellars, Fruitland Park, Florida
- 2017 Boudreaux Campbell, Crockett, Texas
- 2016 Roscoe Jarboe, New Plymouth, Idaho
- 2015 Bryce Barrios, Bluff Dale, Texas
- 2014 Sage Kimzey, Strong City, Oklahoma*
- 2013 Cooper Davis, Jasper, Texas
- 2012 Trey Benton III, Rock Island, Texas
- 2011 Chandler Bownds, Lubbock, Texas
- 2010 Dylan Werner, Bushnell, Florida
- 2009 Tyler Willis, Wheatland, Wyoming
- 2008 Douglas Duncan, Huntsville, Texas
- 2007 Brad Pierce, Snyder, Texas
- 2006 Edgard Oliveira, Denton, Texas
- 2005 Steve Woolsey, Spanish Fork, Utah
- 2004 Clayton Foltyn, El Campo, Texas
- 2003 Matt Austin, Wills Point, Texas*
- 2002 Robbie Russell, Jacksonville, Texas
- 2001 Slade Malone, Devine, Texas
- 2000 Zack Brown, Yorba Linda, California
- 1999 Felipe Aragon, Tome, New Mexico
- 1998 Danell Tipton, Spencer, Oklahoma
- 1997 Mike White, Lake Charles, Louisiana*
- 1996 Tony Mendes, Reno, Nevada
- 1995 Curt Lyons, Ardmore, Oklahoma
- 1994 Chad Brennan, Ellsworth, Nebraska
- 1993 Shawn Egg, Hockley, Texas
- 1992 Gilbert Carillo, El Paso, Texas
- 1991 Ty Watkins, Monahans, Texas
- 1990 Michael Gaffney, Lubbock, Texas
- 1989 David Bailey, Tahlequah, Oklahoma
- 1988 David Berry, Locust Grove, Oklahoma
- 1987 Kevin Smith, Allen, Nebraska
- 1986 Jim Sharp, Kermit, Texas*
- 1985 Scott Breding, Billings, Montana
- 1984 Sam Poutous, Julian, California
- 1983 Jacky Gibbs, Ivanhoe, Texas
- 1982 Denny Weir, Carthage, Texas
- 1981 Robert Christie, Spanish Fork, Utah
- 1980 Ted Nuce, Manteca, California*
- 1979 Gary Toole, Mangum, Oklahoma
- 1978 Scott Brauchie, San Antonio, Texas
- 1977 Allan Jordan Jr., Bloomington, California

Source: *later become a world champion

=== Steer Roping Rookie of the Year ===
- 2026 Clint Buringa, Golden, Colorado
- 2025 Riley O'Rourke, Skiatook, Oklahoma
- 2024 Trent Sorey, Pendleton, Oregon
- 2023 Will Eddleman, Santa Anna, Texas
- 2022 Logan Currie, Wharton, Texas
- 2021 Slade Wood, New Ulm, Texas
- 2020 Dalton Walker, Clyde, Texas
- 2019 Cole Patterson, Pratt, Kansas*
- 2018 Chance Jasperson, Hudson Oaks, Texas
- 2017 Kelton McMillen, Paden, Oklahoma
- 2016 Matt Garrett, Barnsdall, Oklahoma
- 2015 Thomas Smith, Barnsdall, Oklahoma#
- 2014 Tom Smith, Barnsdall, Oklahoma
- 2013 Brodie Poppino, Big Cabin, Oklahoma
- 2012 Joe Wells, Cisco, Texas
- 2011 Rob Denny, Willcox, Arizona
- 2010 Gannon Quimby, Mannford, Oklahoma
- 2009 Spicer Lewis, Abilene, Texas
- 2008 Tim Abbott, Midland, Texas
- 2007 K.W. Lauer, Buffalo, Oklahoma
- 2006 Tyler Mayse, Ponca City, Oklahoma
- 2005 Cody Scheck, Buffalo, Oklahoma
- 2004 Brady Garten, Pawhuska, Oklahoma
- 2003 Neal Wood, Guy, Texas
- 2002 Jarrett Blessing, Paradise, Texas
- 2001 John McDaniel, Adair, Oklahoma
- 2000 Scott Bliss, Sheridan, Wyoming
- 1999 Bobby Brock, Cushing, Oklahoma
- 1998 Clay Cameron, Claude, Texas
- 1997 Paul Patton, Abilene, Texas
- 1996 Trevor Brazile, Decatur, Texas*
- 1995 Jimmy Vaughan, Argyle, Texas
- 1994 Kenyon Burns, Lovington, New Mexico
- 1993 J. Paul Williams, Ponca City, Oklahoma
- 1992 Rocky Patterson, Pratt, Kansas*
- 1991 Todd Casebolt, Sinton, Texas
- 1990 Scott Stickley, Denton, Texas
- 1989 Bucky Hefner, Chelsea, Oklahoma
- 1988 Ben Ingham, Sonora, Texas
- 1987 Vance McNeil, Pecos, Texas
- 1986 Phillip Berry, Lovington, New Mexico
- 1985 Kress Jones, Hobbs, New Mexico
- 1984 Roy Brooks, Amarillo, Texas
- 1983 Jerry Bailey, Washington, Oklahoma
- 1982 Tommy Pearson, Eunice, New Mexico
- 1981 Shaun Burchett, Pryor, Oklahoma*
- 1980 Clark Victory, Chelsea, Oklahoma
- 1979 Bucky Lee Braden, Ponca City, Oklahoma
- 1978 Bobby Harris, Gillette, Wyoming*
- 1977 Jimmy Brazile, Gruver, Texas

Source: *later became a world champion #2015 Steer Roping Rookie of the Year Thomas Smith is the son of Tom Smith, 2014 winner.

=== WPRA Barrel Racing Rookie of the Year ===
- 2026 Morgan Bagnell, Snowmass Village, Colorado
- 2025 Makenzie Mayes, Scroggins, Texas
- 2024 Oceane Veilleux, St-Alfred, Quebec, Canada
- 2023 Kalli McCall, Lufkin, Texas
- 2022 Bayleigh Choate, Fort Worth, Texas
- 2021 Kylee Scribner, Azle, Texas
- 2020 Paige Jones, Wayne, Oklahoma
- 2019 Carly Taylor, Andersonville, Tennessee
- 2018 Jimmie Smith, McDade, Texas
- 2017 Taci Bettis, Round Top, Texas
- 2016 Cayla (Melby) Small
- 2015 Jackie Ganter
- 2014 Sarah Rose McDonald
- 2013 Taylor Jacob
- 2012 Emily Efurd
- 2011 Lee Ann Rust
- 2010 Lindsey Ewing
- 2009 Kelli Tobert
- 2008 Syndi Blanchard
- 2007 Julie Erkamma
- 2006 Audrey Ridgeway
- 2005 Chani Payne
- 2004 Sabrina Lay
- 2003 Brittany Pozzi*
- 2002 Jill Besplug
- 2001 Connie Morris
- 2000 Gloria Freeman
- 1999 Jodi Hollingworth
- 1998 Shelle Shaw
- 1997 Peyton Raney
- 1996 Trula Truitt
- 1995 Ramona Scott
- 1994 Mindy Schueneman
- 1993 JoAnn Middleton
- 1992 Sharon Smith
- 1991 Donna Kennedy
- 1990 Melody Smith
- 1989 Charlotte Schmidt
- 1988 Vana Beissinger
- 1987 Lana Merrick-Hemsted
- 1986 Laura Farley
- 1985 Tacy Cates-Johnson
- 1984 Charmayne James*
- 1983 Sherry Elms
- 1982 Kathy Spears
- 1981 Lee Ann Guilkey
- 1980 Wanda Cagliari
- 1979 Lynn Manning-Flynn
- 1978 Carol Goostree
- 1977 Jackie Jo Perrin
- 1976 Darla Higgins
- 1975 Lynne Mayes
- 1974 Colette Graves-Baier
- 1973 Cheryl Luman
- 1972 Jann Kremling
- 1971 Martha Tompkins-Wright
- 1970 Joleen Hurst Steiner
- 1969 Lee Natalie
- 1968 Ann Lewis*
- 1967 Patti Mack-Prather

Source: * later became a world champion

=== WPRA Breakaway Roping Rookie of the Year ===
- 2026 Amy Ohrt, Victoria, Texas
- 2025 Haiden Thompson, Yoder, Wyoming
- 2024 Summer Williams, Victor, Idaho
- 2023 Braylee Shepherd, Nephi, Utah
- 2022 Josie Conner, Iowa, Louisiana
- 2021 Madison Outhier, Fulshear, Texas

== Livestock Awards ==
=== Bull of the Year ===
Year	Bull Name	Stock Contractor	Reference
2026	Smokey Joe	Universal Pro Rodeos	
2025	Magic Touch	Sankey Pro Rodeo & Phenom Genetics	
2024	Big Bank	Universal Pro Rodeo	
2023	Bayou Bengal	Pete Carr Pro Rodeo	
2022	Smoke Stack	Beutler & Son Rodeo	
2021	Chiseled	Powder River Rodeo	
2020	Chiseled	Powder River Rodeo	
2019	Hot & Ready	Harper & Morgan Rodeo	
2018	Spotted Demon	Big Stone Rodeo	
2017	Sweet Pro's Bruiser	Powder River Rodeo	
2016	Midnight Bender	Andrews Rodeo	
2015	Crystal Deal	Growney Brothers	
2014	Cross the Wyoming Line	Summit Pro Rodeo	
2013	Shepherd Hills Tested	D&H Cattle Company	
2012	Cat Ballou	4L and Diamond S Rodeo	
2011	Palm Springs	4L and Diamond S Rodeo	
2010	After Party	Silverado Rodeo	
2009	Buckeye	Silverado Rodeo	
2008	Voodoo Child	Beutler & Sons	
2007	Voodoo Child	Beutler & Sons	
2006	Biloxi Blues	Harland Robertson	
2005	Smokeless War Dance	Klein Brothers	
2004	Dippin' Tahonta	Big Bend Rodeo	
2003	Dippin' Tahonta	Big Bend Rodeo	
2002	Smokeless Unforgiven	Big Bend Rodeo	
2001	Copenhagen's Hurricane	Stace Smith Pro Rodeos	
2000	Skoal's Border Patrol	Flying 5 Rodeo	
1999	Skoal's Yellow Jacket	Flying 5 Rodeo	
1998	Skoal's King Kong	Dell Hall	
1997	Copenhagen's Rapid Fire	Big Bend Rodeo	
1996	Dodge Ram Tough (Red Wolf)	Growney Brothers	
1995	Bodacious	Andrews Rodeo	
1994	Bodacious	Andrews Rodeo	
1993	Grasshopper	Western Rodeos	
1992	Copenhagen's Rocky	Western Rodeos	
1991	Skoal's Outlaw Willy	Andrews Rodeo	
1990	Skoal's Pacific Bell	Western Rodeos	
1989	Skoal's Pacific Bell	Western Rodeos	
1988	Skoal's Pacific Bell	Western Rodeos	
1987	Red Rock	Growney Brothers	
1986	Mr. T	Burns Rodeo Company	
1985	Cowtown	Beutler & Sons	
1984	No. 105	Dell Hall	
1983	Oscar's Velvet	Christiansen Brothers	
1982	Savage Seven	Tommy Steiner	
1981	(tie) Savage Seven	Tommy Steiner	
1981	(tie) No. 105	Dell Hall	
1980	No. 777	Harry Vold Rodeo	
1979	No. 777	Harry Vold Rodeo	
1978	Red Lightning	Tommy Steiner	
1977	General Isomo	Beutler Brothers and Cervi	
1976	Panda Bear	Harry Vold Rodeo	
1975	(tie) Black 6	Tommy Steiner	
1975	(tie) Tiger	Cervi Rodeo	
1974	Tiger	Billy Minick	

=== Saddle Bronc Horse of the Year ===
Year	Horse Name	Stock Contractor	Reference
2026	Heavy Feathers	Summit Pro Rodeo	
2025	Virgil	C5 Rodeo Company	
2024	All or Nothin'	Andrews Rodeo	
2023	Xplosive Skies	Calgary Stampede	
2022	Black Tie	Sankey Pro Rodeo & Phenom Genetics	
2021	Onion Ring	Korkow Rodeos	
2020	Womanizer	Cervi Brothers	
2019	Nutrenas's Killer Bee	Beutler & Son Rodeo Company	
2018	Lunatic From Hell	Burch Rodeo	
2017	Wound Up	Beutler & Son Rodeo	
2016	Medicine Woman	Frontier Rodeo	
2015	Medicine Woman	Frontier Rodeo	
2014	Medicine Woman	Frontier Rodeo	
2013	(tie) Spring Planting	Flying Rodeo	
2013	(tie) Maple Leaf	Frontier Rodeo	
2012	Chuckulator	Sutton Rodeos	
2011	Medicine Woman	Frontier Rodeo	
2010	Painted Valley	Harry Vold Rodeo	
2009	Spring Planting	Flying 5 Rodeo	
2008	(tie) Cool Alley	Kesler Championship Rodeo	
2008	(tie) Blood Brother	Burch Rodeo	
2007	Miss Congeniality	Power River Rodeo	
2006	Slippery	Korkow Rodeo	
2005	Miss Congeniality	Powder River Rodeo	
2004	Cool Alley Dip	Kesler Championship Rodeo	
2003	Painted Smile Dip	Kesler Rodeo	
2002	Painted Smile	Kesler Rodeo	
2001	Skoal's Painted Smile	Kesler Rodeo	
2000	(tie) Skoal's Spring Fling	Big Bend Rodeo	
2000	(tie) Surprise Party Skoal	Sankey Rodeo	
1999	Skoal's Spring Fling	Sankey Rodeo	
1998	Skoal's Wild Card	Sankey Rodeo	
1997	Skitso Skoal	Sankey Rodeo	
1996	Kingsway Skoal	Franklin Rodeo Stock	
1995	Kingsway Skoal	Franklin Rodeo Stock	
1994	Skitso Skoal	Sankey Rodeo	
1993	Bobby Joe Skoal	Harry Vold Rodeo	
1992	Bobby Joe Skoal	Harry Vold Rodeo	
1991	Bobby Joe Skoal	Harry Vold Rodeo	
1990	Lonesome Me Skoal	Calgary Stampede	
1989	Lonesome Me Skoal	Calgary Stampede	
1988	Skoal's Alley Cat	Kesler Rodeo	
1987	(tie) Challenger Skoal	Beutler & Son	
1987	(tie) Kloud Grey Skoal	Calgary Stampede	
1986	Wrangler Savvy	Harry Vold Rodeo	
1985	Blow Out	Beutler & Son	
1984	Try Me	Wayne Vold	
1983	Alibi	Dell Hall	
1982	Buckskin Velvet	Flying U	
1981	Rusty	Harry Vold Rodeo	
1980	Brookman's Velvet	Cervi Championship	
1979	(tie) Angel Sings	Harry Vold Rodeo	
1979	(tie) Deep Water	Jim Sutton	
1978	Angel Sings	Harry Vold Rodeo	
1977	Crystal Springs	Bob Barnes	
1976	Sarcee Sorrel	Harry and Wayne Vold	
1975	Frontier Airlines	Beutler Brothers and Cervi	
1974	Checkmate	Bobby Christensen	

=== Bareback Horse of the Year ===
Year	Horse Name	Stock Contractor	Reference
2026	Disco Party	Calgary Stampede	
2025	Lunatic Heaven	Brookman Rodeo	
2024	Boot Barn's Night Crawler	Pickett Pro Rodeo	
2023	Night Crawler	Pickett Pro Rodeo	
2022	Gun Fire	Frontier Rodeo	
2021	Xplosive Skies	Calgary Stampede	
2020	Top Flight	Pickett Pro Rodeo	
2019	Get Smart	Northcott Macza	
2018	Virgil	C5 Rodeo	
2017	Virgil	C5 Rodeo	
2016	Craig at Midnight	Powder River Rodeo	
2015	Dirty Jacket	Pete Carr Rodeo	
2014	Dirty Jacket	Pete Carr Rodeo	
2013	Full Baggage	Frontier Rodeo	
2012	MGM Deuces Night	Pete Carr Rodeo	
2011	Full Baggage	Frontier Rodeo	
2010	Big Tex	Classic Pro Rodeo	
2009	Grated Coconut	Calgary Stampede	
2008	Grated Coconut	Calgary Stampede	
2007	Grated Coconut	Calgary Stampede	
2006	Grated Coconut	Calgary Stampede	
2005	Real Deal	Smith, Harper & Morgan	
2004	Grated Coconut	Calgary Stampede	
2003	Grated Coconut	Calgary Stampede	
2002	Alley Ways	Kesler Championship Rodeo	
2001	Skoal's Cool Alley	Kesler Championship Rodeo	
2000	Copenhagen Comotion	Beutler and Gaylord	
1999	Copenhagen Comotion	Beutler and Gaylord	
1998	Copenhagen Comotion	Beutler and Gaylord	
1997	Skoal's Spring Fling	Big Bend Rodeo	
1996	Khadafy Skoal	Powder River Rodeo	
1995	Khadafy Skoal	Powder River Rodeo	
1994	Lonesome Me Skoal	Calgary Stampede	
1993	Skoal's Airwolf	Franklin Rodeo Stock	
1992	High Chaparral Copenhagen	Bar T Rodeo (Canada)	
1991	Satan's Skoal	Dorenkamp	
1990	Khadafy Skoal	Powder River Rodeo Productions	
1989	High Chaparral Copenhagen	Don Peterson	
1988	Kingsway Skoal	Franklin Rodeo Stock	
1987	Skoal's Sippin' Velvet	Bernis Johnson	
1986	Sippin' Velvet	Bernis Johnson	
1985	Tombstone	Jim Sutton	
1984	(tie) Sippin' Velvet	Bernis Johnson	
1984	(tie) Lonesome Me	Calgary Stampede	
1983	Sippin' Velvet	Bernis Johnson	
1982	Smith & Velvet (formerly Mr. Smith)	Bobby Christensen	
1981	Classic Velvet	Flying U	
1980	Smith & Velvet (formerly Mr. Smith)	Christensen Brothers	
1979	Smith & Velvet (formerly Mr. Smith)	Christensen Brothers	
1978	Sippin' Velvet	Bernis Johnson	
1977	(tie) Alley Cat	Bar T Rodeo (Kerbys)	
1976	Mr. Smith	Christensen Brothers	
1975	Stormy Weather	Steiner	
1974	Smokey	Harry Vold Rodeo	

=== Stock of the Year, 1956-1973 ===
From 1956-1973, only one saddle-bronc horse was named every year.

Stock of the Year
Year	Name	Contractor
1956	War Paint	Christensen Brothers
1957	War Paint	Christensen Brothers
1958	(tie) War Paint	Christensen Brothers
1958	(tie) Joker	Harry Knight
1959	Trails End	Zumwalt Rodeo
1960	Jake	Harry Knight
1961	Jesse James	Hoss Inman
1962	Big John	Harry Knight
1963	Big John	Harry Knight
1964	Wanda Dee	Calgary Stampede
1965	Jake	Harry Knight
1966	Descent	Beutler Brothers & Cervi
1967	Descent	Beutler Brothers & Cervi
1968	Descent	Beutler Brothers & Cervi
1969	Descent	Beutler Brothers & Cervi
1970	Rodeo News	Reg Kesler
1971	Descent	Beutler Brothers & Cervi
1972	Descent	Beutler Brothers & Cervi
1973	Sam Bass	Jiggs Beutler

=== AQHA/PRCA/WPRA Horse of the Year ===
AQHA/PRCA/WPRA Horse of the Year
Year	Event	Nickname	Name	Owners	Rider	Ref
2026	Pick-Up Man	Redman	Precision War Doc	Vanessa Kraft	Tyler Kraft	
2026	Breakaway Roping	Copper	Oke Colours	Rylee George	Rylee George	
2026	Barrel Racing	Piper	Buncha Dinero	Hayley Gibson-Stillwell	Hayley Gibson-Stillwell	
2026	Tie-Down Roping	Bugsy	Stylish Bugsy	Shane Hanchey	Shane Hanchey	
2026	Steer Wrestling	Banker	Telle Em PYC	Justin Shaffer	Justin Shaffer, Tucker Allen, Jesse Brown, Holden Myers, Clay Tom Hurt	
2026	Steer Roping	Big Country	Unbreykable	Kelton McMillen	Kelton McMillen	
2026	Team Roping (heading)	Ernie	Dashing Company	Guy and Shanna Howell	Brenten Hall	
2026	Team Roping (heeling)	Copper	Hezaluckysonofagun	Jake and Tasha Long	Jake Long	
2025	Pick-Up Man	Baby	Baby He's Hot	Vanessa Kraft	Tyler Kraft	
2025	Breakaway Roping	Dutch	Stylish Drifter	Josie Conner	Josie Conner	
2025	Barrel Racing	Sister	DM Sissy Hayday	Hailey Kinsel	Hailey Kinsel	
2025	Tie-Down Roping	Rudy	Marked Up Cat	Riley Webb	Riley Webb	
2025	Steer Wrestling	Banker	Telle Em PYC	Justin Shaffer	Justin Shaffer, Tucker Allen, Jesse Brown, Holden Myers, Jace Melvin	
2025	Steer Roping	Junior	Son Ofa Glo	Slade Wood	Slade Wood	
2025	Team Roping (heading)	Joe	Mr. Joe's Shadow	Clint and Darren Summers	Clint Summers	
2025	Team Roping (heeling)	Coon	Cut Off My Spots	Coleby Payne	Coleby Payne	
2024	Pick-Up Man	Tuffy	Guys High on Fame	Tyler and Vanessa Kraft	Tyler Kraft	
2024	Breakaway Roping	Dutch	Stylish Drifter	Josie Conner	Josie Conner	
2024	Barrel Racing	Jarvis	Force the Goodbye	Michael Boone	Kassie Mowry	
2024	Tie-Down Roping	Lollipop	Figure to Fly	Shad Mayfield	Shad Mayfield	
2024	Steer Wrestling	Crush	Finding Meno	TC Equine LLC	Ty Erickson, J.D. Struxness, Rowdy Parrott	
2024	Steer Roping	Big Country	Unbreykable	Kelton McMillen	Kelton McMillen	
2024	Team Roping (heading)	Spur	Espula Bro	Tyler and Jessi Wade	Tyler Wade	
2024	Team Roping (heeling)	Turbo	Kadabra King	Patrick and Christi Smith	Patrick Smith	
2023	Pick-Up Man	Baby	Baby He's Hot	Tyler Kraft	Tyler Kraft	
2023	Breakaway Roping	Onna	No Wimpy Turns	Shelby Boisjoli	Shelby Boisjoli	
2023	Barrel Racing	Poprocks	Fame Fire Rocks	Mission Ranch LLC	Taycie Matthews	
2023	Tie-Down Roping	Bugsy	Stylish Bugsy	Shane Hanchey	Shane Hanchey, Caleb Smidt, Hunter Herrin	
2023	Steer Wrestling	Eddie	EDS Famous Bar	Tanner Milan	Dalton Massey, Tanner Milan, Stephen Culling, Ryan Shuckburgh, Curtis Cassidy, Mike McGinn, J.D. Struxness	
2023	Steer Roping	Junior	Son of a Glow	Slade Wood	Slade Wood	
2023	Team Roping (heading)	Joe	Mr. Joe's Shadow Bar	Clint Summers	Clint Summers	
2023	Team Roping (heeling)	Turbo	Kadabra King	Patrick & Christi Smith	Patrick Smith	
2022	Breakaway Roping	Baybe	Baybe Bullet	Taylor & Joey Williams	Joey Williams	
2022	Barrel Racing	Rollo	Famous Lil Jet	Jordon & Justin Briggs	Jordon Briggs	
2022	Tie-Down Roping	Pockets	Pocketful of Light	Caleb Smidt	Caleb Smidt & Marty Yates	
2022	Steer Wrestling	Tyson	Dashin Haze	Curtis Cassidy	J.D. Struxness, Jesse Brown, Curtis Cassidy, Stephen Culling, Kyle Irwin, Rowdy Parrott, Will Lummus	
2022	Steer Roping	Goose	JS Frosty's Badger	Scott & Kelly Snedecor	Scott Snedecor	
2022	Team Roping (heading)	Grey	Jess A Moose	Jim Donnan	Lightning Aguilera	
2022	Team Roping (heeling)	Turbo	Kadabra King	Patrick & Christi Smith	Patrick Smith	
2021	Breakaway Roping	Onna	No Wimpy Turns	Shelby Lynn Boisjoli	Shelby Lynn Boisjoli	
2021	Barrel Racing	Rollo	Famous Lil Jet	Justin & Jordon Briggs	Jordon Briggs	
2021	Steer Wrestling	Tyson	Dashin Haze	Curtis Cassidy	Curtis Cassidy, Jesse Brown, Scott Guenthner	
2021	Steer Roping	Tigger	RBS Badger Tigger	Cole Patterson	Cole Patterson	
2021	Tie-Down Roping	Paraguaia	Sort of Popular	Marcos Costa	Marcos Costa	
2021	Team Roping (heading)	Annie	Ima Fresnos Dee	Cody Snow	Cody Snow	
2021	Team Roping (heeling)	Drago	Nita Win Playboy	Logan	Medlin	
2020	Barrel Racing	Valor	High Valor	Dona Kay Rule	Dona Kay Rule	
2020	Steer Wrestling	Tyson	Dashin Haze	Curtis Cassidy	Curtis & Jesse Brown	
2020	Steer Roping	Professor	Lena Joe Ichi	Martin Poindexter	Martin Poindexter	
2020	Tie-Down Roping	Pockets	Pocketful of Lights	Caleb Smidt	Caleb Smidt	
2020	Team Roping (heading)	Bob	RK Tuff Trinket	Riley Minor	Riley Minor	
2020	Team Roping (heeling) (tie)	Sug	Leos Highbrow	Brady Minor	Brady Minor	
2020	Team Roping (heeling) (tie)	Drago	Nita Win Playboy	Logan Medlin	Logan Medliin	
2019	Tie-Down Roping	Big Time	Little Smart Leo	Tyler Milligan	Tyler Milligan	
2019	Steer Wrestling	Rattle	Do Get Famous	Matt & Savanah Reeves	Matt Reeves	
2019	Team Roping (heading)	Smoke	Jewels Smoke Screen	Brad Lands	Tate Kirchenschlager	
2019	Team Roping (heeling)	Sugar	DT Sugar Chex Whiz	Dixon Flowers QH	Billie Jack Saebens	
2019	Steer Roping	Dunny	Mr Blakburn Chex 113	Rocky Patterson	Cole Patterson	
2019	Barrel Racing	Valor	High Valor	Dona Kay Rule	Dona Kay Rule	
2018	Tie-Down Roping	Bigtime	Little Smart Leo	Tyler Milligan		
2018	Steer Wrestling	Scooter	Canted Plan	Tyler Pearson and Kyle Irwin		
2018	Team Roping (heading)	Bob	RK Tuff Trinket	Riley Minor		
2018	Team Roping (heeling)	Colonel	Zans Colonel Shine	Jake & Tasha Long		
2018	Steer Roping	Cooper	Cooperslittletoy	Jarrett & Jessica Blessing		
2018	Barrel Racing	Sister	DM Sissy Hayday	Dan & Leslie Kinsel		
2017	Tie-Down Roping	Si	Simon Cow	Shane Hanchey		
2017	Steer Wrestling	Scooter	Canted Plan	Tyler Pearson and Kyle Irwin		
2017	Team Roping (heading)	Clint	Madison Oak	Chad Masters		
2017	Team Roping (heeling)	Colonel	Zans Colonel Shine	Jake and Tasha Long		
2017	Steer Roping	Salty	Carols Sassy Doc	John Bland		
2017	Barrel Racing	Sister	Rafter W Minnie Reba	Sam Williams		
2016	Tie-Down Roping	Colonel	MFO Harvey	Timber Moore		
2016	Steer Wrestling	Cadillac	Landrys Cadillac	Sterling Wallace		
2016	Team Roping (heading)	Badger	Tuffys Badger Chex	Ronald Schmidt		
2016	Team Roping (heeling)	Colonel	Zans Colonel Shine	Jake and Tasha Long		
2016	Steer Roping (tie)	Punchy	At War Leo	Cody Lee		
2016	Steer Roping (tie)	Champ	Tonk Champ	Chris Glover		
2016	Barrel Racing	Tibbie	Four Tibbie Stinson	Kelly and Ivy Conrado		
2015	Tie-Down Roping	Flea	Sweet as Time	Renato Antunes		
2015	Steer Wrestling	Shakem	KR Montana Shake Em	Ty Erickson and Kyler Ranch		
2015	Team Roping (heading)	Dew	Dew the Dash	Clay Tryan		
2015	Team Roping (heeling)	Rey	Rey Shines on Top	Brady Minor		
2015	Steer Roping	Rowdy	Weavers Diamond Bar	Tim Tillard		
2015	Barrel Racing	Custer	French First Watch	Jill Welsh		
2014	Tie-Down Roping	Rambo	Dualin Demon	Hunter Herrin		
2014	Steer Wrestling	Cadillac	Landrys Cadillac	Frank Sterling Wallace		
2014	Team Roping (heading)	Tevo	El Cash Tevo	Brandon Beers		
2014	Team Roping (heeling)	Rey	Rey Shines on Top	Brady Minor		
2014	Steer Roping	Major	Olee Roberto	Thomas Snedecor		
2014	Barrel Racing	Cowboy	Wonders Cowboy Dan	H.Q. Bass		
2013	Tie-Down Roping	Pearl	Big Smokin Wonder	Sid Miller		
2013	Steer Wrestling	Two Guns	Speedy Faila	Wade Sumpter		
2013	Team Roping (heading)	Jewel	Lucys Fast Jewel	Brandon Beers		
2013	Team Roping (heeling)	Starbucks	CD Starbucks	Ryan Motes		
2013	Steer Roping (tie)	Major	Olee Roberto	Thomas Snedecor		
2013	Steer Roping (tie)	Woody	Larneds Ricoche Doc	Dan Fisher		
2013	Barrel Racing	Babyflo	Flos Heiress	Dian and Shelton Taylor		
2012	Tie-Down Roping	Sweetness	Eightys Sport	Spur Resources 1 and Clint Cooper		
2012	Steer Wrestling	Dillon	Dillons Dash	Les Shepperson		
2012	Team Roping (heading)	Sic Em	Lite My Dynamite	Trevor Brazile		
2012	Team Roping (heeling)	Cave Man	Fine Snip of Doc	Jade Corkill		
2012	Steer Roping	Bullseye	White Hot Ike	Chance Kelton		
2012	Barrel Racing	Latte	Perculatin	Mary Walker		
2011	Tie-Down Roping	Sweetness	Eightys Sport	Spur Resources 1 and Clint Cooper		
2011	Steer Wrestling	Wick	Dashs Dapper Star	Wade Sumpter and Ken Lewis		
2011	Team Roping (heading)	Classic	Sycamore Gold Finger	Zac Small and Keven Daniel		
2011	Team Roping (heeling)	Dugout	CDS Quixote	Brady Minor		
2011	Steer Roping	Pokey	Senior Sonita	Cody Lee		
2011	Barrel Racing (tie)	Duke	Yeah Hes Firen	Brittany Pozzi		
2011	Barrel Racing (tie)	Stingray	MP Meter My Hay	Sherry Cervi and Mel Potter		
2010	Tie-Down Roping	Sweetness	Eightys Sport	Spur Resources 1 and Clint Cooper		
2010	Steer Wrestling	Wick	Dashs Dapper Star	Wade Sumpter and Ken Lewis		
2010	Team Roping (heading)	Vegas	Ra Sonoita Silver	Turtle Powell		
2010	Team Roping (heeling)	Cave Man	Fine Snip of Doc	Jade Corkill		
2010	Steer Roping	Pops	Skips Harlan Tyree	Rocky Patterson		
2010	Barrel Racing	Jethro	Judge Buy Cash	Frank and Lynne Mays		
2009	Tie-Down Roping	Pearl	Big Smokin Wonder	Sid Miller		
2009	Steer Wrestling	Jessie	Rocks Eye Opener	Lee Graves		
2009	Team Roping (heading)	Walt	Precious Speck	Travis Tryan		
2009	Team Roping (heeling)	Diesel	Baileys Copper Doc	Randon Adams		
2009	Steer Roping	Woody	Larneds Ricoche Doc	Dan Fisher		
2009	Barrel Racing	Fred	Rare Fred	Ronald Martin		
2008	Tie-Down Roping (tie)		OzAcre Te Run	Justin Maass		
2008	Tie-Down Roping (tie)	Dually	Dual Sonny Dee	Priscilla Pipkin		
2008	Steer Wrestling	Willy	Rtr Little Willy	Greg Cassidy		
2008	Team Roping (heading)	Walt	Precious Speck	Travis Tryan		
2008	Team Roping (heeling)	Diesel	Baileys Copper Doc	Randon Adams		
2008	Steer Roping (tie)	Woody	Larneds Ricoche Doc	Dan Fisher		
2008	Steer Roping (tie)	Happy	Happy San Doc	Paul Patton		
2008	Barrel Racing	Martha	Sugar Moon Express	Lindsay Sears		
2007	Tie-Down Roping	Flip	Smash Par Fancy	Paige Maass		
2007	Steer Wrestling	Jessie	Rocks Eye Opener	Lee Graves		
2007	Team Roping (heading)	Walt	Precious Speck	Travis Tryan		
2007	Team Roping (heeling) (tie)	Diesel	Baileys Copper Doc	Randon Adams		
2007	Team Roping (heeling) (tie)	Amigo	Sunday Night Bingo	Patrick and Christi Smith		
2007	Steer Roping	Shep	River Lightning Bug	Scott Shepard		
2007	Barrel Racing	Stitch	Sixth Vision	Randy and Brittany Pozzi		
2006	Tie-Down Roping	Luke	Express on Heir	Cody Ohl		
2006	Steer Wrestling	Zan	FF Zans A Baron	James Burks		
2006	Team Roping (heading)	Nickolas	Nicks Rockets Rojo	Matt Sherwood		
2006	Team Roping (heeling)	Diesel	Baileys Copper Doc	Randon Adams		
2006	Steer Roping	Dunny	Okays Sunbeam	J.P. and Pat Wickett		
2006	Barrel Racing	Fred	Rare Fred	Ronald H. Martin		
2005	Tie-Down Roping	Topper	TopoftheMarket	Stran Smith		
2005	Steer Wrestling	Zan	FF Zans A Baron	James Burks		
2005	Team Roping (heading)	Thumper	Docalickin	Pauline Robertson		
2005	Team Roping (heeling)	Chili Dog	Pets Ten	Rich Skelton		
2005	Steer Roping	Tarzan	Bobs Lena	Cash Myers		
2005	Barrel Racing	Sparky	Sparky Impression	June and Donnell Holeman		
2004	Tie-Down Roping	Ned	IR Still Dry	Monty Lewis		
2004	Steer Wrestling	Zan	FF Zans a Barton Jack	Rodney and Jacob Burks		
2004	Team Roping (heading)	Megazord	Megazord	Tee Woolman		
2004	Team Roping (heeling)	Chili Dog	Pets Ten	Rich Skelton		
2004	Steer Roping	Jeremiah	Two D Ole Man	Guy Allen		
2004	Barrel Racing	Elmer	Krimps Ready to Go	Paula Seay		
2003	Tie-Down Roping	Topper	Topofthemarket	Stran Smith and Trent Wells		
2003	Steer Wrestling	Jackpot	Ima Star O Lena	Bryan Fields		
2003	Team Roping (heading)	Walt	Precious Speck	Travis Tryan		
2003	Team Roping (heeling)	Potato Chip	Marvins Wonder	Dugan Kelly		
2003	Steer Roping	Leo	Fannin War Leo	Vin Fisher Jr.		
2003	Barrel Racing	Tally	Top Tally	Nathan Williams and Darlene Kasper		
2002	Tie-Down Roping	Tweeter	Tinys Clipso	Trevor Brazile		
2002	Steer Wrestling	KO Jak	Sort of Like Fast	Clyde Himes		
2002	Team Roping (heading)	Calhoon	Smoothly Anchored	Richard Eiguren		
2002	Team Roping (heeling)	Wick	Smokin Holly 045	Allen Bach		
2002	Steer Roping	Boudreaux	Tee Sue Jr.	Jason Evans and Jim Evans		
2002	Barrel Racing	Llave	The Key Grip	Robert and Kay Blandford		
2001	Tie-Down Roping	Easy	Leos Sen Bar	Herbert Theriot		
2001	Steer Wrestling	Scooter	Bad Motor Scooter	Jimmy Powers		
2001	Team Roping (heading)	Calhoon	Smoothly Anchored	Richard Eiguren		
2001	Team Roping (heeling)	Roany	Boons Smooth Val	Rich Skelton		
2001	Steer Roping	Jeremiah	Two D Ole Man	Guy Allen		
2001	Barrel Racing	Fiesta	Firewater Fiesta	Kelly Yates		
2000	Tie-Down Roping	Grumpy	Kid Taurus	Brent Lewis		
2000	Steer Wrestling	Becky	Becky My Loop	Brent Arnold		
2000	Team Roping (heading)	Viper	Keep On Flushing	Speed Williams		
2000	Team Roping (heeling)	Dinero	Nifty Jacks Back	Kyle Lockett		
2000	Steer Roping	Jeremiah	Two D Ole Man	Guy Allen		
2000	Barrel Racing	Fiesta	Firewater Fiesta	Kelly Yates		
1999	Tie-Down Roping	Smokey	Smokin Dee	Jerome Schneeberger		
1999	Steer Wrestling	Preacher	Padres Perfection	Wayne Jennings		
1999	Team Roping (heading)	Scooter	Oklahoma Top Hat	Charles Pogue		
1999	Team Roping (heeling)	Roany	Boons Smooth Val	Rich Skelton		
1999	Steer Roping	Jeremiah	Two D Ole Man	Guy Allen		
1999	Barrel Racing	Bozo	French Flash Hawk	Kristie Peterson		
1998	Tie-Down Roping	Deuce	Merry Two Bar	Trent Walls		
1998	Steer Wrestling	Scooter	Bad Motor Scooter	Jimmy Powers		
1998	Team Roping (heading)	Scooter	Oklahoma Top Hat	Charles Pogue		
1998	Team Roping (heeling)	Roany	Boons Smooth Val	Rich Skelton		
1998	Steer Roping	Rocky	Dr. Rocky Bob	Bucky Hefner		
1998	Barrel Racing	Bozo	French Flash Hawk	Kristie Peterson		
1997	Tie-Down Roping	Rifleman	Kido Doc	Stran Smith		
1997	Steer Wrestling	Baby Blue	Mamas Jr.	Byron Walker and George Strait		
1997	Team Roping (heading)	Scooter	Oklahoma Top Hat	Charles Pogue		
1997	Team Roping (heeling)	Roany	Boons Smooth Val	Rich Skelton		
1997	Steer Roping	Bullet	Jack Bart Tender	Guy Allen		
1997	Barrel Racing	Bozo	French Flash Hawk	Kristie Peterson		
1996	Tie-Down Roping	Art	Little Ring	Junior and Gaynell Lewis		
1996	Steer Wrestling	San Wood	Super San Wood	Justin, Todd and Randy Suhn		
1996	Team Roping (heading)	Butterbean	Mark My Dream	Steve Purcella		
1996	Team Roping (heeling)	Iceman	Fits Smokin Dream	Kory Koontz		
1996	Steer Roping	Chubs	Vans Lad	Mel Potter		
1996	Barrel Racing	Bozo	French Flash Hawk	Kristie Peterson		
1995	Tie-Down Roping	Orejas	Cowboy Marine	Jerry Jetton		
1995	Steer Wrestling	Whitey	Mr. Light Star	Bill Duvall		
1995	Team Roping (heading)	Rooster	Ayes Have It	Eddie Wikerson		
1995	Team Roping (heeling)	Blue	Wills Budha	Cody Cowden		
1995	Steer Roping	Refuse	Flaxy Flash	H.I. Todd		
1995	Barrel Racing	Bozo	French Flash Hawk	Kristie Peterson		
1994	Tie-Down Roping	Prime Time	Grand Rapid Return	Jim Farris		
1994	Steer Wrestling	Yellow Dog	Too Vee	Jimmy and Allison Powers		
1994	Team Roping (heading)	Spiff	Tres Spiffy Dude	Bobby Hurley		
1994	Team Roping (heeling)	Dunny	Bar Five Koys Dun	Steve Northcott		
1994	Steer Roping	Santa Claus	Gray Baldy	Arnold Felts		
1994	Barrel Racing	Brown	Special Agreement	Bubba & Deb Mohon		
1993	Tie-Down Roping	Boogie Man	Broadway Tar Baby	Mike, Janet, and Charlee Arnold		
1993	Steer Wrestling	Hank	Hank Bar Binion	Bill Cresta		
1993	Team Roping (heading)	Scooter	Oklahoma Top Hat	Charles Pogue		
1993	Team Roping (heeling)	Iceman	Fits Smokin Dream	Kory Koontz		
1993	Steer Roping	Dutch	Codys Bar Skip	Tee Woolman		
1993	Barrel Racing	Scamper	Gils Bay Boy	Charmayne James		
1992	Tie-Down Roping	Malachi	Tommys Blue Bag	Brent Lewis		
1992	Steer Wrestling	Skippy	Skip D Sack	Harrison Halligan		
1992	Team Roping (heading)	Scooter	Oklahoma Top Hat	Charles Pogue		
1992	Team Roping (heeling)	Iceman	Fits Smokin Dream	Kory Koontz		
1992	Steer Roping	Dutch	Codys Bar Skip	Tee Woolman		
1992	Barrel Racing	Scamper	Gil Bays Boy	Charmayne James		
1991	Tie-Down Roping	Boogie Man	Broadway Tar Man	Mike, Janet and Charlee Arnold		
1991	Steer Wrestling	Doc	Doc Bee Quick	Larry Ferguson		
1991	Team Roping (heading)	Scooter	Oklahoma Top Hat	Charles Pogue		
1991	Team Roping (heeling)	Dunny	Bar Five Koys Dun	Steve Northcutt		
1991	Steer Roping	Dutch	Cody Bar Skip	Mack Yates & Tee Woolman		
1991	Barrel Racing	Scamper	Gils Bay Boy	Charmayne James		
1990	Tie-Down Roping	Mr. Tee	Power Key	Johnny Emmons		
1990	Steer Wrestling	Doc	Doc Bee Quick	Larry Ferguson		
1990	Team Roping (heading)		Yellow Bar Smug	Bobby Hurley		
1990	Team Roping (heeling)	B.J.	Jet Interruption	Dennis Watkins		
1990	Steer Roping	Rocky	Barley Needs Rivet	Mack Yates		
1990	Barrel Racing	Scamper	Gil Bays Boy	Charmayne James		
1989	Tie-Down Roping		Doc's Desperado	Paul Zanardi/Joe Parsons		
1989	Steer Wrestling	Doc	Doc Bee Quick	Larry Ferguson		
1989	Team Roping (heading)	Mr. Ruby Clerk		Matt Tyler		
1989	Team Roping (heeling)	Flint's Friend		J.D. Yates		
1989	Steer Roping	Dutch	Codys Bar Skip	Tee Woolman		
1989	Barrel Racing	Scamper	Gil Bays Boy	Charmayne James		

=== Top NFR Bucking Stock ===
Top Bucking Stock of the NFR
Year	Stock Type	Stock Name	Contractor	Ref
2025	Saddle Bronc	Indian Burn	Bridwell Pro Rodeo	
2025	Bareback Bronc	Disco Party	Calgary Stampede	
2025	Bull Riding	Pegasus	McCoy Rodeo	
2024	Saddle Bronc	All or Nothin' (tie); Tickled Pink (tie)	Andrews Rodeo; Championship Pro Rodeo	
2024	Bareback Bronc	Virgil	C5 Rodeo	
2024	Bull Riding	Ricky Vaughn	Powder River Rodeo	
2023	Saddle Bronc	Xplosive Skies	Calgary Stampede	
2023	Bareback Bronc	Virgil (tie); Gun Fire (tie)	C5 Rodeo; Frontier Rodeo	
2023	Bull Riding	Red Demon	Universal Pro Rodeo	
2022	Saddle Bronc	Killer Bee	Beutler & Son Rodeo	
2022	Bareback Bronc	Masterhand Milling's Ghost Town	Beutler & Son Rodeo	
2022	Bull Riding	Masterhand Milling's Smoke Stack	Beutler & Son Rodeo	
2021	Saddle Bronc	Get Smart	Macza Pro Rodeo	
2021	Bareback Bronc	Night Gazer	Pickett Pro Rodeo	
2021	Bull Riding	Chiseled	Powder River Rodeo	
2020	Saddle Bronc	Get Smart	Northcott Macza Pro Rodeo	
2020	Bareback Bronc	Nutrena's Killer Bee	Beutler & Son Rodeo	
2020	Bull Riding	Pookie Holler	Universal Pro Rodeo	
2019	Saddle Bronc	RodeoHouston's Womanizer	Cervi Championship Rodeo	
2019	Bareback Bronc	Top Notch	Pickett Pro Rodeo	
2019	Bull Riding	Sweet Pro's Bruiser	Powder River Rodeo	
2018	Saddle Bronc	Get Smart	Northcott Macza	
2018	Bareback Bronc	Nutrena's Killer Bee	Beutler & Son Rodeo	
2018	Bull Riding	Spotted Demon	Big Stone Rodeo	
2017	Saddle Bronc	Wound Up	Beutler & Son Rodeo	
2017	Bareback Bronc	Virgil	C5 Rodeo	
2017	Bull Riding	Sweet Pro's Bruiser	D&H Cattle	
2016	Saddle Bronc	Wound Up	Beutler & Son Rodeo	
2016	Bareback Bronc	Xplosive Skies	Calgary Stampede	
2016	Bull Riding	Yellow Fever	Four Star Rodeo	
2015	Saddle Bronc	Medicine Woman	Frontier Rodeo	
2015	Bareback Bronc	Full Baggage	Frontier Rodeo	
2015	Bull Riding	Sweet Pro's Bruiser	D&H Cattle	
2014	Saddle Bronc	Killer Bee	Beutler & Son Rodeo	
2014	Bareback Bronc	PTSD Power Play	Andrews Rodeo	
2014	Bull Riding	Swat Slinger	Andrews Rodeo	
2013	Saddle Bronc	Killer Bee	Beutler & Son Rodeo	
2013	Bareback Bronc	Assault	Rafter G Rodeo	
2013	Bull Riding	Crystal Deal	Growney Brothers	
2012	Saddle Bronc	Chuckulator	Sutton Rodeos	
2012	Bareback Bronc	Full Baggage	Frontier Rodeo	
2012	Bull Riding	Shepherd Hills Tested	Powder River Rodeo	
2011	Saddle Bronc	Fancy Pants	Bar T Rodeo	
2011	Bareback Bronc	Delta Ship	Frontier Rodeo	
2011	Bull Riding	King of Hearts	Corey & Lange Rodeo	
2010	Saddle Bronc	Medicine Woman	Frontier Rodeo	
2010	Bareback Bronc	Full Baggage	Frontier Rodeo	
2010	Bull Riding	Hard Times	Beutler Brothers & Cervi Rodeo	
2009	Saddle Bronc	Painted Valley	Harry Vold Rodeo	
2009	Bareback Bronc	Delta Ship	Frontier Rodeo	
2009	Bull Riding	Bring It	Flying U Rodeo	
2008	Saddle Bronc	Sock Dancer	Growney Brothers	
2008	Bareback Bronc	Grated Coconut	Calgary Stampede	
2008	Bull Riding	Troubadour	Flying U Rodeo	
2007	Saddle Bronc	Awesome	Wayne Vold Rodeo	
2007	Bareback Bronc	Magic Wars	Mosbrucker Rodeo	
2007	Bull Riding	Cochise	Dan Klein and Sons Rodeo	
2006	Saddle Bronc	Country Cat	Kesler Rodeo	
2006	Bareback Bronc	Wise Guy	Pete Carr's Classic Rodeo	
2006	Bull Riding	Lucky Strike	David Bailey Rodeo	
2005	Saddle Bronc	Slippery	Korkow Rodeos	
2005	Bareback Bronc	Awesome	Wayne Vold Rodeo	
2005	Bull Riding	Lucky Strike	David Bailey Rodeo	
2004	Saddle Bronc	Cool Alley Dip	Kesler Championship Rodeo	
2004	Bareback Bronc	Roly Poly	Andrews Rodeo	
2004	Bull Riding	Reindeer Dippin'	Flying U Rodeo	
2003	Saddle Bronc	Airwolf	Franklin Rodeo Stock	
2003	Bareback Bronc	Moulin Rouge	Growney Brothers	
2003	Bull Riding	Dippin' Super Cool	David Bailey Rodeo	
2002	Saddle Bronc	Smokeless Spring Fling	Big Bend Rodeo	
2002	Bareback Bronc	Chester Dippin Bandit	Big Stone Rodeo	
2002	Bull Riding	Dippin' Super Cool	David Bailey Rodeo	
2001	Saddle Bronc	Spring Fling	Big Bend Rodeo	
2001	Bareback Bronc	Cool Alley	Kesler Championship Rodeo	
2001	Bull Riding	Prime Time	Salt River Rodeo	
2000	Saddle Bronc	Skoal's Painted Smile	Kesler Rodeo	
2000	Bareback Bronc	Order Up	Kesler Rodeo	
2000	Bull Riding	Dodge Durango	Rafter G Rodeo	
1999	Saddle Bronc	Skoal's Airwolf	Franklin Rodeo Stock	
1999	Bareback Bronc	Khadafy Skoal	Powder River Rodeo	
1999	Bull Riding	Unforgiven	Big Bend Rodeo	
1998	Saddle Bronc	Wyatt Earp Skoal	Harvey Northcott	
1998	Bareback Bronc	Polka Dot	Kesler Rodeo	
1998	Bull Riding	Skat Kat Skoal	Andrews Rodeo	
1997	Saddle Bronc	Wyatt Earp Skoal	Harvey Northcutt	
1997	Bareback Bronc	Commotion	Beutler and Gaylord Rodeo	
1997	Bull Riding	Copenhagen Cowtown II	Beutler and Gaylord Rodeo	
1996	Saddle Bronc	Copenhagen Blue Jeans	Pinz Rodeo	
1996	Bareback Bronc	Khadafy Skoal	Powder River Rodeo	
1996	Bull Riding	Skat Kat Skoal	Andrews Rodeo	
1995	Saddle Bronc	Kingsway Skoal	Franklin Rodeo	
1995	Bareback Bronc	Brown Bomber	Beutler Brothers & Cervi	
1995	Bull Riding	Dodge Bodacious	Andrews Rodeo	
1994	Saddle Bronc	Copenhagen Blue Jeans	Pinz Rodeo	
1994	Bareback Bronc	Khadafy Skoal	Powder River Rodeo Productions	
1994	Bull Riding	Dodge Bodacious	Andrews Rodeo	
1993	Saddle Bronc	Kingsway Skoal	Franklin Rodeo	
1993	Bareback Bronc	River Bubbles	Calgary Stampede	
1993	Bull Riding	Copenhagen Gunslinger	David Bailey Rodeo	
1992	Saddle Bronc	Snydly Skoal	Sankey Rodeo	
1992	Bareback Bronc	High Chaparral Copenhagen	Bar T Rodeo (Canada)	
1992	Bull Riding	Bodacious	Andrews Rodeo	
1991	Saddle Bronc	Bobby Joe Skoal	Harry Vold	
1991	Bareback Bronc	High Chaparral Copenhagen	Bar T Rodeo (Canada)	
1991	Bull Riding	Wolfman Skoal	Growney Brothers Rodeo	
1990	Saddle Bronc	Sparrow	Bar T Rodeo (Kerbys)	
1990	Bareback Rodeo	Mindy	Dorenkamp Rodeo	
1990	Bull Riding	Playboy Skoal	David Bailey	
1989	Saddle Bronc	Saddle Bags	Verne Franklin	
1989	Bareback Bronc	Skoal Sippin' Velvet	B-J Rodeo	
1989	Bull Riding	Mr. T Copenhagen	Pete Burns	
1988	Saddle Bronc	Matt Dillon	Harvey Northcutt	
1988	Bareback Bronc	Kingsway Skoal	Verne Franklin	
1988	Bull Riding	Ivy Skoal Classic	Ivy Rodeo	
1987	Saddle Bronc	Angel Blue	Flying U	
1987	Bareback Bronc	Kingsway	Verne Franklin	
1987	Bull Riding	Pacific Bell	Western Rodeos	
1986	Saddle Bronc	Angel Blue	Flying U	
1986	Bareback Bronc	Sippin' Velvet	Bernis Johnson	
1986	Bull Riding	Mr. T	Pete Burns	
1985	Saddle Bronc	Angel Blue	Flying U	
1985	Bareback Bronc	Tom Thumb	Harper and Morgan	
1985	Bull Riding	Cowtown	Beutler and Sons	
1984	Saddle Bronc	Zippo Velvet	Circle K	
1984	Bareback Bronc	Lonesome Me	Calgary Stampede	
1984	Bull Riding	Cowtown	Beutler and Sons	
1983	Saddle Bronc	Short Crop	Reg Kesler	
1983	Bareback Bronc	Classic Velvet	Flying U	
1983	Bull Riding	Sunni's Velvet	Cervi Championship Rodeo	
1982	Saddle Bronc	Rusty	Harry Vold Rodeo	
1982	Bareback Bronc	Sippin' Velvet	Bernis Johnson	
1982	Bull Riding	Velvet Wipeout	Ehrick Goolsby	
1981	Saddle Bronc	Rusty	Harry Vold Rodeo	
1981	Bareback Bronc	Dreamboat Annie	Growney Brothers Rodeo	
1981	Bull Riding	No. 105	Dell Hall	
1980	Saddle Bronc	High Roll	Cervi Championship	
1980	Bareback Bronc	Three Bars	Reg Kesler Rodeo	
1980	Bull Riding	Ruff & Ready	Neal Gay	
1979	Saddle Bronc	Frontier Velvet (formerly Ekalaka)	Beutler Brothers and Cervi	
1979	Bareback Bronc	Sippin' Velvet	Johnson and Markum	
1979	Bull Riding	No. 105	Dell Hall	
1978	Saddle Bronc	Ekalaka	Beutler Brothers & Cervi	
1978	Bareback Bronc	Sippin' Velvet	Bernis Johnson	
1978	Bull Riding	Red Lightning	Tommy Steiner	
1977	Saddle Bronc	Short Crop	Reg Kesler	
1977	Bareback Bronc	Double Jeopardy	Bob Aber	
1977	Bull Riding	Top Hand	Bob Aber	
1976	Saddle Bronc	Sunday Punch	Stephens Brothers	
1976	Bareback Bronc	Strawberry	Sonny Linger	
1976	Bull Riding	Red One	Joe Kelsey	
1975	Saddle Bronc	Old Shep	Bob Aber	
1975	Bareback Bronc	High Tide	Golden State Rodeo	
1975	Bull Riding	No. 33	Harry Vold	
1974	Saddle Bronc	Zone Along	Calgary Stampede	
1974	Bareback Bronc	Spark Plug (tie); Skyrocket (tie)	Walt Alsbaugh; Joe Kelsey	
1974	Bull Riding	Ringeye	Mesquite Rodeo	
1973	Saddle Bronc	Rip Cord	C & E Rodeo	
1973	Bareback Bronc	Three Bars	Reg Kesler	
1973	Bull Riding	Tiger	Billy Minick	
1972	Saddle Bronc	Streamer	Billy Minick	
1972	Bareback Bronc	Smokey	Harry Vold	
1972	Bull Riding	No. 17	Beutler Brothers and Cervi	
1971	Saddle Bronc	High Ball	Arizona Pro Rodeos	
1971	Bareback Bronc	Moonshine	Reg Kesler	
1971	Bull Riding	Andy Capp	Jim Shoulders	
1970	Saddle Bronc	Big Sandy	Beutler Brothers, Cervi, & Linger	
1970	Bareback Bronc	Necklace	Harry Vold	
1970	Bull Riding	V-61	Harry Knight	
1969	Saddle Bronc (tie)	Trade Winds	Big Bend Rodeo	
1969	(tie)	Major Reno	Rodeos, Inc.	
1969	Bareback Bronc	Cindy Rocket	Calgary Stampede	
1969	Bull Riding	Droopy	Walt Alsbaugh	
1968	Saddle Bronc	Major Reno	Rodeos, Inc.	
1968	Bareback Bronc	Necklace	Harry Vold	
1968	Bull Riding	Booger Bear	Mesquite Rodeo	
1967	Saddle Bronc	Sheep Mountain	Rodeos, Inc.	
1967	Bareback Bronc	Three Bars	Kesler	
1967	Bull Riding	Missoula	Christensen Brothers	
1966	Saddle Bronc	Tea Trader	Rodeos, Inc.	
1966	Bareback Bronc	Necklace	Harry Vold	
1966	Bull Riding	Wilfred	Christensen	
1965	Saddle Bronc	Trade Winds	Big Bend Rodeo	
1965	Bareback Bronc	Bay Miggs	Flint Hills Rodeo	
1965	Bull Riding	Tornado	Jim Shoulders	
1964	Saddle Bronc	Trade Winds	Big Bend Rodeo	
1964	Bareback Bronc	Necklace	Harry Vold	
1964	Bull Riding	Tornado	Jim Shoulders	
1963	Saddle Bronc	Jake	Harry Knight	
1963	Bareback Bronc	Devil's Partner	Harry Knight	
1963	Bull Riding	Tornado	Jim Shoulders	
1962	Saddle Bronc	Big John	Harry Knight	
1962	Bareback Bronc	Snappy John	Beutler Brothers	
1962	Bull Riding	Tornado	Jim Shoulders	
1961	Saddle Bronc	Trails End	Oral Zumwalt	
1961	Bareback Bronc	Come Apart	Harry Knight	
1961	Bull Riding	Baldy	Korkow and Sutton	
1960	Saddle Bronc	Trails End	Oral Zumwalt	
1960	Bareback Bronc	Short Fuse	Flying U	
1960	Bull Riding	Old Speck	Beutler Brothers and Son	
1959	Saddle Bronc	Trails End	Oral Zumwalt	
1959	Bareback Bronc	Come Apart	Harry Knight	
1959	Bull Riding	Old Speck	Beutler Brothers and Son	

== Rodeo Committees of the Year ==
=== 1984-1992 ===
Year	Rodeo Committee*	Rodeo	Location
1984	(tie) Spooner, Wis., Kissimmee, Fla., & Bonifay, Fla.		
1985	(tie) Dodge City, Kan., Phoenix, Ariz., & Santa Maria, Calif.		
1986	Dodge City, Kansas	Round-Up Rodeo	Kansas
1987	(tie) Dodge City, Kan., Round-Up Rodeo and Reno (Nev.) Rodeo		
1988	Dodge City, Kansas	Round-Up Rodeo	Kansas
1989	Dodge City, Kansas	Round-Up Rodeo	Kansas
1990	Dodge City, Kansas	Round-Up Rodeo	Kansas
1991	Dodge City, Kansas	Round-Up Rodeo	Kansas
1992	Dodge City, Kansas	Round-Up Rodeo	Kansas

*In 1991, this category was divided into Outdoor Rodeo Committee of the Year and Indoor Rodeo Committee of the Year. The outdoor committee was split again in 1993. Then, there was the Large Outdoor Rodeo Committee of the Year and Small Outdoor Rodeo Committee of the Year awards. In 2004, the Medium Rodeo Committee of the Year award was added. Source:

=== Large Outdoor Rodeo Committee of the Year ===
($10,000 and more added per event)

Year	Rodeo Committee	City	State
1993	Cheyenne Frontier Days	Cheyenne	Wyoming
1994	Cheyenne Frontier Days	Cheyenne	Wyoming
1995	Cheyenne Frontier Days	Cheyenne	Wyoming
1996	Cheyenne Frontier Days	Cheyenne	Wyoming
1997	Reno Rodeo	Reno	Nevada
1998	Cody Stampede	Cody	Wyoming
1999	Cody Stampede	Cody	Wyoming
2000	Cheyenne Frontier Days	Cheyenne	Wyoming
2001	Dodge City Round-Up	Dodge City	Kansas
2002	Pioneer Days Rodeo	Guymon	Oklahoma
2003	Pendleton Round-Up	Pendleton	Oregon
2004	Cheyenne Frontier Days	Cheyenne	Wyoming
2005	Cheyenne Frontier Days	Cheyenne	Wyoming
2006	Cheyenne Frontier Days	Cheyenne	Wyoming
2007	Cheyenne Frontier Days	Cheyenne	Wyoming
2008	Cheyenne Frontier Days	Cheyenne	Wyoming
2009	Cheyenne Frontier Days	Cheyenne	Wyoming
2010	(tie) Cheyenne Frontier Days	Cheyenne	Wyoming
2010	(tie) Pendleton Round-Up	Pendleton	Oregon
2011	Cheyenne Frontier Days	Cheyenne	Wyoming
2012	Cheyenne Frontier Days	Cheyenne	Wyoming
2013	Cheyenne Frontier Days	Cheyenne	Wyoming
2014	Cheyenne Frontier Days	Cheyenne	Wyoming
2015	Pendleton Round-Up	Pendleton	Oregon
2016	Pendleton Round-Up	Pendleton	Oregon
2017	Pendleton Round-Up	Pendleton	Oregon
2018	Pendleton Round-Up	Pendleton	Oregon
2019	Pendleton Round-Up	Pendleton	Oregon
2020	Days of '76 Rodeo	Deadwood	South Dakota
2021	Pendleton Round-Up	Pendleton	Oregon
2022	Pendleton Round-Up	Pendleton	Oregon
2023	Pendleton Round-Up	Pendleton	Oregon
2024	Pendleton Round-Up	Pendleton	Oregon
2025	Pendleton Round-Up	Pendleton	Oregon

=== Medium Rodeo Committee of the Year ===
($3,000 to $9,999 added money per event)

Year	Rodeo Committee	City	State
2004	Days of '76 Rodeo	Deadwood	South Dakota
2005	Days of '76 Rodeo	Deadwood	South Dakota
2006	Days of '76 Rodeo	Deadwood	South Dakota
2007	Days of '76 Rodeo	Deadwood	South Dakota
2008	Days of '76 Rodeo	Deadwood	South Dakota
2009	Days of '76 Rodeo	Deadwood	South Dakota
2010	Days of '76 Rodeo	Deadwood	South Dakota
2011	Days of '76 Rodeo	Deadwood	South Dakota
2012	Days of '76 Rodeo	Deadwood	South Dakota
2013	Days of '76 Rodeo	Deadwood	South Dakota
2014	Days of '76 Rodeo	Deadwood	South Dakota
2015	Days of '76 Rodeo	Deadwood	South Dakota
2016	Days of '76 Rodeo	Deadwood	South Dakota
2017	Days of '76 Rodeo	Deadwood	South Dakota
2018	Black Hills Roundup	Belle Fourche	South Dakota
2019	Black Hills Roundup	Belle Fourche	South Dakota
2020	Black Hills Roundup	Belle Fourche	South Dakota
2021	Black Hills Roundup	Belle Fourche	South Dakota
2022	Black Hills Roundup	Belle Fourche	South Dakota
2023	Home of Champions	Red Lodge	Montana
2024	Black Hills Roundup	Belle Fourche	South Dakota
2025	Black Hills Roundup	Belle Fourche	South Dakota

=== Small Rodeo Committee of the Year ===
(Less than $3,000 added money per event)

Year	Rodeo Committee	City	State
1993	(tie) Pioneer City Rodeo	Palestine	Illinois
1993	(tie) Payson Pro Rodeo	Payson	Arizona
1994	Pioneer City Rodeo	Palestine	Illinois
1995	Deke Latham Memorial Rodeo	Kaycee	Wyoming
1996	Deke Latham Memorial Rodeo	Kaycee	Wyoming
1997	Iowa's Championship Rodeo	Sidney	Iowa
1998	Days of '76 Rodeo	Deadwood	South Dakota
1999	Days of '76 Rodeo	Deadwood	South Dakota
2000	Days of '76 Rodeo	Deadwood	South Dakota
2001	Days of '76 Rodeo	Deadwood	South Dakota
2002	ProRodeo Series	Steamboat Springs	Colorado
2003	Rooftop Rodeo	Estes Park	Colorado
2004	Parker County Sheriff's Posse Rodeo	Weatherford	Texas
2005	(tie) MDA Pro Rodeo	Athens	Texas
2005	(tie) A Tribute to Chris LeDoux Pro Rodeo	Casper	Wyoming
2006	Rooftop Rodeo	Estes Park	Wyoming
2007	Crystal Springs Ranch Rodeo	Clear Lake	South Dakota
2008	Rooftop Rodeo	Estes Park	Colorado
2009	Rooftop Rodeo	Estes Park	Colorado
2010	Rooftop Rodeo	Estes Park	Colorado
2011	Elizabeth Stampede	Elizabeth	Colorado
2012	Elizabeth Stampede	Elizabeth	Colorado
2013	Elizabeth Stampede	Elizabeth	Colorado
2014	Will Rogers Stampede PRCA Rodeo	Claremore	Oklahoma
2015	Will Rogers Stampede PRCA Rodeo	Claremore	Oklahoma
2016	Will Rogers Stampede PRCA Rodeo	Claremore	Oklahoma
2017	Will Rogers Stampede PRCA Rodeo	Claremore	Oklahoma
2018	Will Rogers Stampede PRCA Rodeo	Claremore	Oklahoma
2019	Gem State Classic Pro Rodeo	Blackfoot	Idaho
2020	Mesquite Championship Rodeo	Mesquite	Texas
2021	Will Rogers Stampede	Claremore	Oklahoma
2022	Abbyville Frontier Days	Abbyville	Kansas
2023	Gem State Classic Pro Rodeo	Blackfoot	Idaho
2024	Cowtown Rodeo	Pilesgrove Township	New Jersey
2025	Cody Nite Rodeo	Cody	Wyoming

=== Large Indoor Rodeo Committee of the Year ===
Year	Rodeo Committee	City	State
1991	Houston Livestock Show and Rodeo	Houston	Texas
1992	Houston Livestock Show and Rodeo	Houston	Texas
1993	Houston Livestock Show and Rodeo	Houston	Texas
1994	Houston Livestock Show and Rodeo	Houston	Texas
1995	Houston Livestock Show and Rodeo	Houston	Texas
1996	Houston Livestock Show and Rodeo	Houston	Texas
1997	National Western Rodeo	Denver	Colorado
1998	Houston Livestock Show and Rodeo	Houston	Texas
1999	Houston Livestock Show and Rodeo	Houston	Texas
2000	National Western Rodeo	Denver	Colorado
2001	National Western Rodeo	Denver	Colorado
2002	Black Hills Stock Show & Rodeo	Rapid City	South Dakota
2003	Black Hills Stock Show & Rodeo	Rapid City	South Dakota
2004	Houston Livestock Show and Rodeo	Houston	Texas
2005	San Antonio Stock Show & Rodeo	San Antonio	Texas
2006	San Antonio Stock Show & Rodeo	San Antonio	Texas
2007	San Antonio Stock Show & Rodeo	San Antonio	Texas
2008	San Antonio Stock Show & Rodeo	San Antonio	Texas
2009	San Antonio Stock Show & Rodeo	San Antonio	Texas
2010	San Antonio Stock Show & Rodeo	San Antonio	Texas
2011	San Antonio Stock Show & Rodeo	San Antonio	Texas
2012	San Antonio Stock Show & Rodeo	San Antonio	Texas
2013	San Antonio Stock Show & Rodeo	San Antonio	Texas
2014	San Antonio Stock Show & Rodeo	San Antonio	Texas
2015	San Antonio Stock Show & Rodeo	San Antonio	Texas
2016	San Antonio Stock Show & Rodeo	San Antonio	Texas
2017	San Antonio Stock Show & Rodeo	San Antonio	Texas
2018	San Antonio Stock Show & Rodeo	San Antonio	Texas
2019	Houston Livestock Show and Rodeo	Houston	Texas
2020	Black Hills Stock Show & Rodeo	Rapid City	South Dakota
2021	Black Hills Stock Show & Rodeo	Rapid City	South Dakota
2022	Fort Worth Stock Show & Rodeo	Fort Worth	Texas
2023	Black Hills Stock Show & Rodeo	Rapid City	South Dakota
2024	Black Hills Stock Show & Rodeo	Rapid City	South Dakota
2025	Black Hills Stock Show & Rodeo	Rapid City	South Dakota

== John Justin Standard of the West Committeeman of the Year ==
Year	Committeeman	Rodeo	Location
1990	Philip Diehl	Pawhuska Elks Rodeo	Pawhuska, Oklahoma
1991	Cletus Schenk	Red River PRCA Rodeo	Wichita Falls, Texas
1992	Duane Mahlum	Wolf Point Wild Horse Stampede	Wolf Point, Montana
1993	Homer Carter	Omak Stampede	Omak, Washington
1994	Hal Littrell	Pikes Peak or Bust Rodeo	Colorado Springs, Colorado
1995	Jack W. Saulls	Moses Lake Roundup Rodeo	Moses Lake, Washington
1996	Leslie Bartschi	Pocatello Frontier Rodeo	Pocatello, Idaho
1997	Ed Thiele	Omak Stampede	Omak, Washington
1998	Ken MacRae	Ellensburg Rodeo	Ellensburg, Washington
1999	Bud Munroe	Heart O' Texas Rodeo	Waco, Texas
2000	Darrel Stromer	Oregon Trail Rodeo	Hastings, Nebraska
2001	Kathy Fraser	Corn Palace Stampede Rodeo	Mitchell, South Dakota
2002	Vern Carpenter	Snake River Stampede	Nampa, Idaho
2003	Steve Coleman	St. Paul Rodeo	St. Paul, Oregon
2004	Mike Lucke	Reno Rodeo	Reno, Nevada
2005	Ronnie Parks	Heart O' Texas Fair and Rodeo	Waco, Texas
2006	Lee Graves	Deke Latham Memorial Rodeo	Kaycee, Wyoming
2007	Joel Smith	Ellensburg Rodeo	Ellensburg, Washington
2008	Jim Thompson	Deke Latham Memorial Rodeo	Kaycee, Wyoming
2009	Russell Erben	Comal County Fair and Rodeo	New Braunfels, Texas
2010	DeLois Thompson	Marshall Pro Rodeo	Marshall, Texas
2011	Julie Graber	Kansas' Largest Night Rodeo	Pretty Prairie, Kansas
2012	Tom Weinman	Kansas' Biggest Rodeo	Phillipsburg, Kansas
2013	Steve Alder	Ellensburg Rodeo	Ellensburg, Washington
2014	Bill Stephens	Crossett Riding Club PRCA Rodeo	Crossett, Arkansas
2015	Mike Mathis	Lukfin PRCA Rodeo	Lufkin, Texas
2016	Steve Heathman	Coulee City Last Stand Rodeo	Coulee City, Washington
2017	Steven Money	Spanish Fork Fiesta Days Rodeo	Spanish Fork, Utah
2018	Jerry Shepherd	Ute Stampede	Nephi, Utah
2019	Susan Thomas	Central Wyoming Fair and Rodeo	Casper, Wyoming
2020	Al Girard	San Bernardino County Sheriff's Rodeo	San Bernardino, California
2021	John Dady	Sitting Bull Stampede	Mobridge, South Dakota
2022	Tim Baldwin	California Rodeo Salinas	Salinas, California
2023	Wade Garrett	Ute Stampede	Nephi, Utah
2024	Matt Weishoff	St. Paul Rodeo	St. Paul, Oregon
2025	Austin Curtis	Sikeston Jaycee Bootheel Rodeo	Sikeston, Missouri
2026	John Adams	Douglas County Fair & Rodeo	Castle Rock, Colorado

== See also ==
- Lists of rodeo performers
- Professional Rodeo Cowboys Association
- Women's Professional Rodeo Association
- ProRodeo Hall of Fame
- Canadian Professional Rodeo Association
- List of Canadian Professional Rodeo Association Champions
- Canadian Pro Rodeo Hall of Fame
- National Rodeo Hall of Fame
- International Professional Rodeo Association
- Professional Bull Riders
- Bull Riders Only
- Championship Bull Riding
- Bull Riding Hall of Fame
- American Bucking Bull
