= Wanda Harper Bush =

American barrel racer (1931-2015)

- Bush in 1989
- Birth name: Wanda Harper
- Occupation: Rodeo competitor
- Discipline: Barrel racing
- Born: October 6, 1931; Mason, Texas
- Died: December 29, 2015 (aged 84); Brady, Texas
- Major wins/Championships: 2 WPRA barrel racing world championships

Honors
- 1978 National Cowgirl Museum and Hall of Fame; 2017 ProRodeo Hall of Fame

Significant horses
- Dee Gee; Flying Eagle

Wanda Harper Bush (October 6, 1931 – December 29, 2015) was an American professional rodeo cowgirl. She competed in the Girl's Rodeo Association (GRA), now known as the Women's Professional Rodeo Association (WPRA), and won two barrel racing world championships, in 1952 and 1953. She was inducted into the National Cowgirl Museum and Hall of Fame in 1978 and the ProRodeo Hall of Fame in 2017. The August 2017 induction ceremony was ProRodeo's 38th annual event, and marked the first time in the event's history that the class of inductees included barrel racers from the Women's Professional Rodeo Association (WPRA).

== Early life ==
Bush was born Wanda Harper in Mason, Texas, on October 6, 1931, to Alvin and Gussie Harper. She first helped her father with goat tying on their ranch but soon graduated to roping calves. She became as proficient as men and, with her horse, Eagle, won a roping contest against a man. The story never circulated far since Bush quietly defeated her opponent and moved on. Bush assisted her father with the ranch duties in many capacities, from ranch chores to punching cows and sheep. She also developed a strong foundation in horsemanship throughout her childhood, riding horses at the ranch. When Bush attended school, she wore her pants under her dress so she could ride her horse the three miles it took to catch the school bus at the end of their road. At school she would remove her pants for the day and then put them back on to go home.

== Career ==
=== Competition ===
When Bush started competing professionally, the sanctioning organization for women's rodeo was the Girl's Rodeo Association (GRA). Bush became one of the first cowgirls to join the GRA, so her card number was 14. Bush was 21 when she won her first national barrel racing championship in 1952. She won again in 1953. She ultimately won 32 world championship titles, in several different rodeo events, including flag racing, calf roping, and ribbon roping. Bush also participated and won in a non-rodeo event, a western event known as cutting.

Bush attributed much of her success to her father's horsemanship and his horses. Especially important to her was her horse, Dee Gee, on whom she won her two national barrel racing championships. When asked about her championships while riding Dee Gee, Bush said "I just did what I did, and I discovered I could ride as good as anyone else could." Bush competed locally and nationally, including match races and stock shows, including the notable Houston Livestock Show and Rodeo and winning often against both genders. The GRA became the Women's Professional Rodeo Association (WPRA) in 1981. Bush's two barrel racing championships are presently recognized by the WPRA and the Professional Rodeo Cowboys Association (PRCA) as barrel racing world championships.

=== Finals events ===
Barrel racing is still sanctioned by the WPRA but is now part of PRCA rodeos and its finals take place alongside men's events such as bull riding and tie-down roping at the National Finals Rodeo (NFR), which is held every December at the Thomas & Mack Center in Las Vegas, Nevada. However, the National Finals Steer Roping event is held separately, in Mulvane, Kansas. Bush qualified for the NFR seven times in her rodeo career. When Bush competed in the NFR, it was held in several different locations.

=== Horses ===
In Bush's GRA competition period, her horse Dee Gee was "pivotal" to her success in barrel racing. Bush retired Dee Gee in 1955 and made her a broodmare in 1958. Dee Gee bore seven colts, with descendants still competing today. Bush also rode the horse Flying Eagle successfully in a number of events. Wanda and her husband, Stanley, both competed in cutting, and both were very successful. Stanley said that their horse Royal Chess was the best cutting horse he ever rode. Royal Chess was out of Phoebe Chess by Royal King. The National Cutting Horse Association (NCHA) Hall of Fame inducted Royal Chess in 1970 when he was owned by Clyde Bauer. Dee Gee and Phoebe Chess provided foundation stock at the Bush's ranch.

== Career summary ==
Bush was semi-retired by her mid-sixties. During her career, Bush won 32 world titles: nine all-around (1952, 1957, 1958, 1962, 1963, 1964, 1965, 1968, 1969), two barrel racing titles (1952, 1953), two cutting world titles (1966, 1969), one flag racing world title (1969), 11 calf roping titles (1951, 1952, 1953, 1954, 1955, 1956, 1960, 1962, 1964, 1966, 1967) and seven ribbon roping titles (1951, 1953, 1954, 1956, 1957, 1958, 1959). She became reserve world champion in barrel racing three times. Even though Bush won her two barrel racing titles prior to when the NFR began, she qualified seven times (1959, 1960, 1962, 1963, 1964, 1965, and 1974) for the NFR during her career. Bush has won more awards than any other cowgirl in the WPRA. In 1968, Bush opened her first clinic in Austin, Texas, to teach barrel racing and horsemanship. As her competition days waned, she opened more clinics. Bush had many successful students. After her death in 2015, the response from her former students was huge and included many top cowgirls. As of 2018, Bush still has won more championships and awards than any other rodeo woman.

== Retirement ==
Bush continued her involvement in rodeo after her retirement. In 1992, at age 62, she competed in the Old Fort Days Futurity. She rode her daughter's mount Flaming Patrick, winning a cash prize and reserve title after not having competed in years. She also served on the GRA Board of Directors in several different positions. In 1969, she had won the aforementioned Houston Livestock Show and Rodeo. Later she secured a GRA-sanctioned barrel race for said show and rodeo. In the 1980s, GRA President Jimmie Munroe asked her to act as the Texas Circuit Director of the RAM National Circuit Finals Rodeo (RNCFR) to resolve an issue concerning equal purse money for women in the PRCA. Bush leveraged her rodeo contacts with all of the Texas rodeo committees to persuade them not to leave the WPRA over the issue. Bush is credited with convincing every rodeo in Texas to pay in so the event could remain. "She was very proud when they got equal money; it was something she always wanted," noted Shanna.

== Personal life ==
Bush preferred a reserved lifestyle, but the fans loved her, so she occasionally attended events to please them. Bush appeared in Rolling Stone magazine in the same issue as rock star Bruce Springsteen and also appeared in the television game show To Tell the Truth. In 1957, Wanda married Stanley Bush. In 1959, they had one daughter, Shanna, who qualified for the National Finals Rodeo (NFR) in barrel racing in 1984.

Bush suffered a heart attack on December 27, 2015, while at home in Mason, Texas. She was admitted to the hospital in Brady, Texas, and died two days later, on December 29. After her death, Jimmie Munroe, past WPRA President, described her as "the greatest horsewoman of all time".

== Awards ==
- 32 World Championships
- 3 Reserve Barrel Racing World Championships
- 1992 Old Fort Days Barrel Racing Futurity Reserve Champion
- 1989 Inaugural Coca-Cola WPRA Women of the Year
- 1998 WPRA Pioneer Women of the Year
- 2014 Lenora Reimers Heritage Award
- 2014 WPRA Lifetime Family Heritage Award, Harper Bush Family

== Honors ==
- 1978 The Rodeo Hall of Fame of the National Cowgirl Museum and Hall of Fame
- 2001 Rodeo Hall of Fame of the National Cowboy and Western Heritage Museum
- 2002 Texas Rodeo Cowboy Hall of Fame
- 2008 Texas Rodeo Hall of Fame
- Texas Cowboy Hall of Fame
- 2017 ProRodeo Hall of Fame

== Additional sources ==
- 2021 WPRA NFR Media Guide | Barrel Racing World Champions 1948 - 2020. Women's Professional Rodeo Association.
