= Federación Mexicana de Rodeo =

Governing body of professional American rodeo in Mexico

- Sport: Rodeo
- Founded: 1992
- Countries: Mexico
- Website: Federación Mexicana de Rodeo

La Federación Mexicana de Rodeo (FMR) or the Mexican Rodeo Federation is the governing body of professional American rodeo in Mexico. It is based in Chihuahua City, Chihuahua.

== History ==
The FMR was created to support and protect rodeo cowboys and cowgirls who risk their lives to run each of the different disciplines of the sport at high risk.

The organization was founded in 1992 by Diego González Fernández, integrating that year different rodeo associations representing the states of Baja California, Sonora, Chihuahua, Nuevo León and Coahuila, thereby complying with the requirement of the Mexican Sports Confederation. Subsequently, associations from the states of Durango, Zacatecas, Hidalgo, Guanajuato, Aguascalientes, Tamaulipas, and others have joined. To date, there are 19 state associations that make up the FMR.

The top cowboys and cowgirls in each rodeo event qualify for the FMR's year-end Campeonato Nacional de Rodeo (National Rodeo Championship) where the national champions are determined. This annual event has been held in different cities throughout its history, but has been consistently held in Chihuahua, Chihuahua, for the last several years. The National Rodeo Championship was first held in 1993 and ran through 1995. However, it was not held again until 2000, and it has been held consistently since then.

The National Rodeo Championship crowns the national champions in the male events of bareback riding, steer wrestling, team roping, saddle bronc riding, tie-down roping, and bull riding, as well as the national champions in the female events of breakaway roping, goat tying, pole bending, and barrel racing.

Each state association that is a member of the FMR also has its own state rodeo circuit and year-end state finals to determine the state champion in each event.

From 2016 to 2019, the Professional Rodeo Cowboys Association (PRCA) co-sanctioned some rodeos with the FMR, and those events counted towards the FMR's national standings, as well as the PRCA's world standings. Due to the COVID-19 pandemic, the partnership between the FMR and PRCA was forced to pause for three years, until resuming in 2023.
