= Gail Petska =

American barrel racer

Gail Petska is an American former professional rodeo cowgirl who specialized in barrel racing. She was a two-time barrel racing world champion. In December 1972 and 1973, she won the championship at the National Finals Rodeo (NFR) at the State Fair Arena in Oklahoma City, Oklahoma.

== Life ==
Gail Petska married Paul Petska, a professional team roper. Paul qualified for the NFR four times. They had three children. When their son Cory grew up, he became a world champion heeler in team roping. Cory also married to four-time world champion barrel racer Sherry Cervi. Sherry qualified for the NFR 19 times. She became winner of the most money in the event with $3.5 million.

== Career ==
Petska competed in the Girls' Rodeo Association (GRA). In 1973, she earned $19,448 by competing in bull riding, calf roping, barrel racing, and goat tying in the GRA. She was living in Tecumseh, Oklahoma, at the time.

Petska won the barrel racing world championship twice on a small horse she named Dobie. Her GRA world championships are now recognized by the Professional Rodeo Cowboys Association and the Women's Professional Rodeo Association.

When Petska won the world championship in 1972, at the State Fair Arena in Oklahoma City, Oklahoma, she won seven of the ten go-rounds. Then she won again in 1973. She had a strong lead in 1974, but got the news that another Petska was on the way. No third title for Gail. Petska won the NFR Average Championship in 1972.

Petska won the barrel racing event at Cheyenne Frontier Days in Cheyenne, Wyoming, twice, in 1972 and in 1973. She also won the NFR Average in 1972.

Petska won 13 consecutive go-rounds in the NFR, which is still a record. She still holds the record for the most rounds won at the NFR in the barrel racing event in one year with 7 rounds.

Petska won the barrel racing event at RodeoHouston in Houston, Texas, twice, once in 1974 and once in 1976.
