= National High School Rodeo Association =

NHSRA logo

The National High School Rodeo Association (NHSRA), based in Denver, Colorado, was incorporated in 1961 to promote interest in rodeo sports among high school students, to provide training, and to establish venues for their performances.

It began in 1947 as a single organization in Texas (National Championship High School Rodeo Association), and has grown to include local organizations in most U.S. states and in Canada, Mexico, Australia, and New Zealand. It has over 12,000 members and sanctions over 1,800 rodeos every year.

The NHSRA holds a finals rodeo every year, changing locations every two years, and awards championships in both girls and boys events.

- Girls events: all-around cowgirl, barrel racing, breakaway roping, pole bending, goat tying, team roping, girls cutting horse, working cow horse, and rodeo queen.
- Boys events: all-around cowboy, tie-down roping, steer wrestling, bareback riding, saddle bronc riding, bull riding, team roping, boys cutting horse, and working cow horse.
- Coed events: team roping.

In addition to high school students, the NHSRA provides similar services for junior high school age students, but with some events unique to this division: boys chute dogging, boys breakaway roping and boys goat tying. The Junior division showcases the only event which must have one girl and one boy: dally ribbon roping.

== National, State, and Provincial organizations ==
=== Australia ===
Visit the Australian High School Rodeo website:

Australian High School Rodeo Association

=== Canada ===
Canada has five provincial NHSRA organizations. Alberta - British Columbia - Manitoba - Ontario - Saskatchewan

=== United States ===
The United States has forty-three state NHSRA organizations. Alabama - Alaska - Arizona - Arkansas - California - Colorado - Florida - Georgia - Hawaii - Idaho - Illinois - Indiana - Iowa - Kansas - Kentucky - Louisiana - Maryland - Michigan - Minnesota - Mississippi - Missouri - Montana - Nebraska - Nevada - New Jersey - New Mexico - New York- North Carolina - North Dakota - Ohio - Oklahoma - Oregon - Pennsylvania - South Carolina - South Dakota - Tennessee - Texas - Utah - Virginia - Washington - West Virginia - Wisconsin - Wyoming

== See also ==
- Rodeo bareback rigging
