= Brittany Pozzi Tonozzi =

American barrel racer

Brittany Pozzi Tonozzi (born February 9, 1984) is an American professional rodeo cowgirl who specializes in barrel racing. She is a three-time Women's Professional Rodeo Association (WPRA) world champion barrel racer. In 2007, 2009, and 2023, she won the championship at the National Finals Rodeo (NFR) in Las Vegas, Nevada.

== Life ==
Brittany Pozzi Tonozzi was born Brittany Pozzi on February 9, 1984, in Victoria, Texas. She learned barrel racing from her father. She moved to Lampasas, Texas, in April 2019. She attended Texas A&M University (College Station). She was previously married to tie-down roper Doug Pharr. She is currently married to team roper Garrett Tonozzi. They have one daughter.

== Career ==
Tonozzi joined the Women's Professional Rodeo Association (WPRA) in 2003. That same year, she was the WPRA Barrel Racing Rookie of the Year. She won the WPRA barrel racing world championship at the NFR in 2007, 2009, and 2023. She won the NFR Average title twice in 2006 and 2007. She has qualified for the NFR 18 times; in 2003, 2005, 2006, 2007, 2008, 2009, 2010, 2011, 2012, 2013, 2017, 2018, 2019, 2020, 2021, 2022, 2023, and 2025. She also qualified for the National Circuit Finals Rodeo three times in 2012, 2013, and 2025. Tonozzi's earnings in 2019 were $105,503. She came in 5th in the world standings. Her career earnings to date as of 2019 were $2,321,480. CNBC recognized Tonozzi as one of their "Blue Collar Millionaires", for her hard work in breeding and training horses as well as barrel racing.

=== 2019 highlights ===
Tonozzi won the Rio Grande Valley Livestock Show and Rodeo in Mercedes, Texas. She won the Evergreen Rodeo in Colorado. She was the co-winner of the Elizabeth Stampede in Colorado. She won the Kit Carson County Pro Rodeo in Burlington, Colorado. She won the Canby Rodeo in Oregon. She qualified for the NFR.

=== 2020 highlights ===
On Friday, February 7, Tonozzi won her fourth title at the San Angelo Stock Show and Rodeo in San Angelo, Texas. She ran a time of 13.93 in the finals, and it was the fastest time of the rodeo. She won $3,270 for the finals along with her $6,622 for winning the average with three runs for a total time of 44.15. At the finals at the end of February, Tonozzi won the title at the San Antonio Stock Show and Rodeo in San Antonio, Texas.

Tonozzi also finished second at these rodeos: Yuma Fair & Rodeo in Colorado, Oakley Independence Day Rodeo in Utah, Coleman PRCA Rodeo in Texas, and West Texas Fair & Rodeo in Abilene, Texas.

== Horses ==
She has a horse with the registered name KissKiss BangBang, nicknamed "Mona", who is a 11-year-old mare as of 2021. Mona is by Dash Ta Fame out of CD Nick Bar. She has another horse with the registered name Babe on the Chase, nicknamed "Birdie", who is a 10-year-old mare as of 2021. Birdie is by Chasin Firewater and out of Streakin Six Babe.

She has another horse registered name Ima Famous Babe, nicknamed "Katniss", who is an 8-year-old mare as of 2021. Katniss is by Dash Ta Fame and out of Streakin Six Babe. Ima Famous Babe won the 2019 Scoti Flit Bar Award.

She has another horse registered named Steele Magnolias, nicknamed "Steeley", who is by Magnolia Bar out of Kings Frosted Lady. Her horse registered name Sixth Vision, nicknamed "Stitch", won the AQHA/WPRA Barrel Racing Horse of the Year Award in 2007, and came in second in 2006. Her horse registered name Yeah Hes Firen, nicknamed "Duke", tied for the award in 2011 and won it in 2012.

== Bibliography ==
- PRCA Awards (PDF). Professional Rodeo Cowboys Association. 2021.
- 2021 WPRA NFR Media Guide | Barrel Racing World Champions 1948 - 2020. Women's Professional Rodeo Association.
