= National Little Britches Rodeo Association =

Youth based rodeo organization

National Little Britches Rodeo
- Abbreviation: NLBRA
- Formation: 1952; 74 years ago
- Type: Amateur Rodeo Organization
- Headquarters: Colorado Springs, Colorado, U.S.
- Members: 15,000 athletes nationwide
- Website: NLBRA.com

The National Little Britches Rodeo (NLBRA) is one of the oldest youth based rodeo organizations. It was founded in 1952, and sanctions rodeos in over 33 states. NLBRA allows children ages 5 to 18 to compete in a variety of different rodeo events. Its championship event is the National Little Britches Finals Rodeo. The NLBRA headquarters is based in Colorado Springs, Colorado, United States. The NLBRA was founded in Littleton, Colorado. The Finals were held in Pueblo, Colorado, but moved to the Lazy E Arena in Guthrie, Oklahoma, in 2016.

The Professional Rodeo Cowboys Association (PRCA) partners with the NLBRA to offer rodeo camps and safety clinics for contestants. The ProRodeo Hall of Fame and Museum of the American Cowboy opened up a National Little Britches Rodeo Association exhibit September 20, 2015. In December 2013, Hope Counts was adopted as the Crisis Fund of the NLBRA.

The NLBRA is featured on a national television western lifestyle show that airs on RFD-TV titled Little Britches Rodeo. They also have a spin-off travel show titled Little Britches on the Road.

== NLBRA events ==
The NLBRA provides three different age groups. Little Wrangler is a coed age group of children between the ages of 5 and 8. Kids ages 9–13 are junior contestants. Senior contestants are ages 14 through 18. Both the junior and senior divisions are broken down into boys and girls events. There are also coed events for the junior and senior categories.

- Girls events: Senior Girls breakaway roping, Senior Girls barrel racing, Senior Girls goat tying, Senior Girls trail course, Senior Girls pole bending, Junior Girls breakaway roping, Junior Girls barrel racing, Junior Girls goat tying, Junior Girls trail course, Junior Girls pole bending.
- Boys events: Senior Boys bareback riding, Senior Boys saddle bronc riding, Senior Boys bull riding, Senior Boys steer wrestling, Senior Boys tie down (calf) roping, Junior Boys Saddle Bronc Steer riding, Junior Boys Bareback steer riding, Junior Boys bull riding, Junior Boys breakaway roping, Junior Boys goat tying, Junior Boys flag racing.
- Coed events: Senior team roping, Senior Dally Ribbon Roping, Junior team roping, Junior Dally Ribbon Roping, Little Wrangler barrel racing, Little Wrangler goat tail untying, Little Wrangler flag racing, Little Wrangler pole bending.

In addition there are awards based up senior and junior all-around cowgirl and all-around cowboy.

A number of notable Pro Rodeo cowboys got their start in Little Britches rodeo.

== Notable alumni ==
Ty Murray

Rope Meyers

Cody Demoss

Lane Frost

Kody Lostroh

Chris LeDoux

Kristie Peterson

Lindsay Sears

Jodi Stoddard

== Royalty pageant ==
NLBRA also features a rodeo queen contest every year at their National Finals. They have three categories: National Queen, National Princess, and National Little Wrangler Princess. The categories are by age group. The National Queen is for contestants 14–18 years old. The National Princess is for contestants 9–13 years old. The National Little Wrangler Princess is for girls ages 5–8.

To be eligible, contestants must accumulate enough points, in rodeo competition, to qualify for the National Finals. The rodeo queen contest involves horsemanship, speaking, and a written test. Several contestants have gone on to win state title for Miss Rodeo America.

== United States franchises ==
The United States has thirty three state NLBRA organizations. Alabama - Arizona - Arkansas - Colorado - Georgia - Idaho - Illinois - Indiana - Iowa - Kansas - Kentucky - Louisiana - Michigan - Minnesota - Mississippi - Missouri - Montana - Nebraska - Nevada - New Mexico- North Carolina - North Dakota - Ohio - Oklahoma - Oregon - South Carolina - South Dakota - Tennessee - Texas - Utah - Virginia - Wisconsin - Wyoming
