= Lindsay Sears =

Canadian professional rodeo cowgirl (born 1981)

Lindsay Sears (born January 1, 1981) is a Canadian professional rodeo cowgirl who specializes in barrel racing. She is a two-time Women's Professional Rodeo Association (WPRA) barrel racing world champion. In December 2008 and 2011, she won the championship at the National Finals Rodeo (NFR) in Las Vegas, Nevada.

== Life ==
Sears was born on January 1, 1981, in High River, Alberta, Canada. She competed in the usual Canadian sports growing up, such as figure skating and swimming. Additional sports included volleyball, basketball, and rodeo. Sears started her career in National Little Britches Rodeo Association. She graduated from Texas Tech University with a degree in Agricultural Applied Economics. She resides in Nanton, Alberta. When she is not competing in professional rodeo, she assists her family in running their cattle business. She also spends time at her second home in Ropesville, Texas, United States.

== Career ==
Sears joined the WPRA in 2000. She won the barrel racing world championship at the NFR in 2008 and 2011. She was the first Canadian to win a barrel racing world championship. She also won the NFR Average title in 2011. She has qualified for the NFR seven times, from 2006-2012. She has won championships at major rodeos like Cheyenne Frontier Days in Cheyenne, Wyoming, RodeoHouston in Houston, Texas, and the Calgary Stampede in Calgary, Alberta. As of 2017, her total career earnings are $1,558,667.

Her horse Sugar Moon Express, nicknamed "Martha", won the 2008 AQHA/WPRA Barrel Horse of the Year Award. She came in third place in 2009. In 2017, Martha was 17 years old. Martha is a sorrel mare by Dr. Nick Bar and out of Babys Blue Jeans. She also has another horse whose name is Ima Guy of Honor, nicknamed Moe, who was 14 years old in 2017. He is a bay gelding out of Frenchmans Guy and by Dontunderestimateher.

Sears bought Martha from trainer Dena Kirkpatrick. The mare had just completed her futurity year. Sears was prepared to season her throughout 2006. However, unknown to Sears, Martha already had her green light on go, as a "green". Martha was 6 years old, while Sears was 25 years old at the time. Martha took her to the NFR that year, but an injury took the horse out before the actual event. When Martha was 100 percent again, she took Sears to the NFR in 2008 and win 5 of 10 rounds and more money in one event, $119,225, than any other competitor.
