= Dally ribbon roping =

Team sport in rodeo

Dally ribbon roping, or simply ribbon roping, is a team rodeo event that features a steer and one mounted riders and one contestant on foot. It is a timed event. The roper starts in the box and the runner must start from a designated spot determined by the field judge. Some rules allow a runner to start anywhere in the arena.

The event begins when the steer breaks the barrier. The roper must rope the steer. Any type of catch is legal. The roper must then "dally" which is to make several loops around the saddle horn with the rope. The runner must then grab the ribbon off the calf's tail. The runner then races back to the box, and the time is stopped once the runner crosses the barrier. Many organizations, like the National Little Britches Rodeo Association (NLBRA) allow coed teams.

== Equipment ==
The equipment is the same used by team ropers:

- Rope - made of synthetic fibers, used to rope the steer.
- Horn wraps - protective wraps that go around the horns of the steer to prevent rope burns and reduce the risk of a horn breaking when roped.
- Roping gloves - To prevent rope burns on the hands of the riders
- Western saddle - Roping saddles have a particularly strong design with double rigging and other specialized features, including a rubber wrap around the saddle horn to keep the dally from slipping, and usually a wooden rawhide-covered saddle tree or a reinforced fiberglass tree.
- Bell boots and brushing boots are placed on the horse's legs for protection

== Rules ==
There are various organizations that sanction team roping events at local, regional and national levels. Some of the rules common to most groups include:

- The roper must start from inside the box
- Depending on the organization the runner may be allowed to start anywhere in the arena or may be limited to a starting location indicated by the judge
- If the barrier is broken there is a 10-second penalty
- Most organizations allow what is called "catch as catch can" which means any roping catch is legal.

== See also ==
- Rodeo
- Calf roping
- Team roping
- Breakaway roping
- Goat tying
