= Kristie Peterson =

American barrel racer

Kristie Peterson (born October 10, 1955) is a ProRodeo Hall of Fame barrel racer. She was inducted into the Cheyenne Frontier Days Hall of Fame in 2020.

== Life ==
Kristie Peterson was born on October 10, 1955, in Dayton, Ohio. She grew up on a ranch. It was near Parker, Colorado, and she and her brother, Scott, became interested in rodeo there. Peterson started her rodeo career in National Little Britches Rodeo Association and tried many events, but eventually settled on barrel racing.

== Career ==
As well as being a hall of fame barrel racer, she is also a four-time barrel racing world champion. In December 1994, 1996, 1997, and 1998, she won the championship at the National Finals Rodeo (NFR) in Las Vegas, Nevada. With Peterson's first world title in 1994, she ended hall of fame Charmayne James' 10 year streak of world titles. In 1995, she came in second, before following up with three consecutive titles in 1996, 1997, and 1998. Peterson is the inaugural winner of the Hazel Turner Sportsmanship Award.

Peterson and her horse Bozo were the reserve champion at the NFR three times in 1993, 1995, and 1999. They earned five consecutive NFR Average titles in 1994, 1995, 1996, 1997, and 1998. They won four National Circuit Finals Rodeo titles in 1992, 1994, 1995, and 1998. Peterson and Bozo generally won every major rodeo in the country. They were especially successful in rodeos near their hometown, such as in Denver, Colorado; Colorado Springs, Colorado; and Cheyenne, Wyoming. In 1996 and 1997 at the NFR, Peterson placed in 20 consecutive rounds on Bozo, which at the time was an accomplishment unmatched by any other.

Peterson's horse, registered name French Flash Hawk, nicknamed Bozo, is also an award winner. Bozo was also inducted into the ProRodeo Hall of Fame. He won the AQHA/WPRA Horse of the Year award five times from 1995, 1996, 1997, 1998, and 1999. Bozo was voted the Horse with the Most Heart four times from 1995, 1996, 1997, and 1998.
