= Hyer Boots =

Cowboy boot company

Hyer Boot Company is a historical American footwear brand that has been widely credited in historical accounts with contributing to the development of the modern cowboy boot. Founded in 1880 by Charles H. Hyer in Olathe, Kansas, the company operated for 102 years before being sold in 1977. In 2023, the brand was relaunched under the name HYER by Zach Lawless, a fifth-generation descendant of the founder.

== History ==
Charles H. Hyer, a shoemaker and leatherwork instructor at the Kansas State School for the Deaf, began making boots from his home in Olathe in 1875. According to historical accounts, in 1876, a cowboy requested a custom boot that would better suit horseback riding. Hyer designed a boot with a pointed toe, higher heel, and scalloped top. This design gained popularity, leading to growing demand and the establishment of a bootmaking business.

Hyer's company expanded significantly, employing family members, former students, and immigrant craftsmen. It eventually adopted the name C.H. Hyer and Sons. The company introduced a mail-order system that included measuring instructions, allowing it to serve customers across the United States and internationally. A version of Hyer's measuring system is still used by modern boot makers.

In 1919, the company was selling 15,000 pairs of boots per year and became known nationally as one of the largest handmade boot manufacturers. Throughout the early and mid-20th century, Hyer boots were worn by figures such as Buffalo Bill Cody, Will Rogers, President Calvin Coolidge, and President Theodore Roosevelt.

Hyer Boots played a prominent role in the community life and economic fabric of Olathe, Kansas. The company's growth made it one of the region's major employers, and its factory became a local landmark. Hyer frequently engaged with local institutions, including hiring graduates from the Kansas State School for the Deaf and supporting regional events like the Johnson County Old Settlers parade. Hyer's cultural impact has also been featured in museums and historical exhibits, such as the permanent displays at the Museum of Deaf History, Arts & Culture in Olathe and the Johnson County Museum.

After Charles H. Hyer died in 1921, his sons continued to run the company. By the 1960s and 1970s, the company faced challenges, including a decline in skilled labor and changes in manufacturing processes. In 1977, the Hyer family sold the business to the Ben Miller Boot Company of El Paso, Texas, which moved operations and phased out the Hyer brand.

== Relaunch ==
In 2023, entrepreneur Zach Lawless, the great-great-grandson of Charles Hyer, relaunched the brand as HYER Boots after acquiring the trademark from its previous owner. Lawless partnered with Western lifestyle company Teton Ridge and brought on individuals with prior experience in the footwear and Western wear industries. The relaunch kept the original boot designs while incorporating updated materials and features.

== Sponsorship ==
Since relaunching in 2023, HYER has become the official boot sponsor of several professional rodeo cowboys and cowgirls.

HYER is the official boot sponsor of The American Rodeo.

HYER is the official boot sponsor of the National High School Rodeo Association (NHSRA).

In 2024 and 2025, HYER was the official boot sponsor of the Arizona Ridge Riders; one of 10 bull riding teams in the Professional Bull Riders (PBR) Team Series held every summer and autumn.

In 2024, HYER released a special pair of boots to commemorate the 125th anniversary of the American Royal.
