= Gymkhana (equestrian) =

Equestrian event

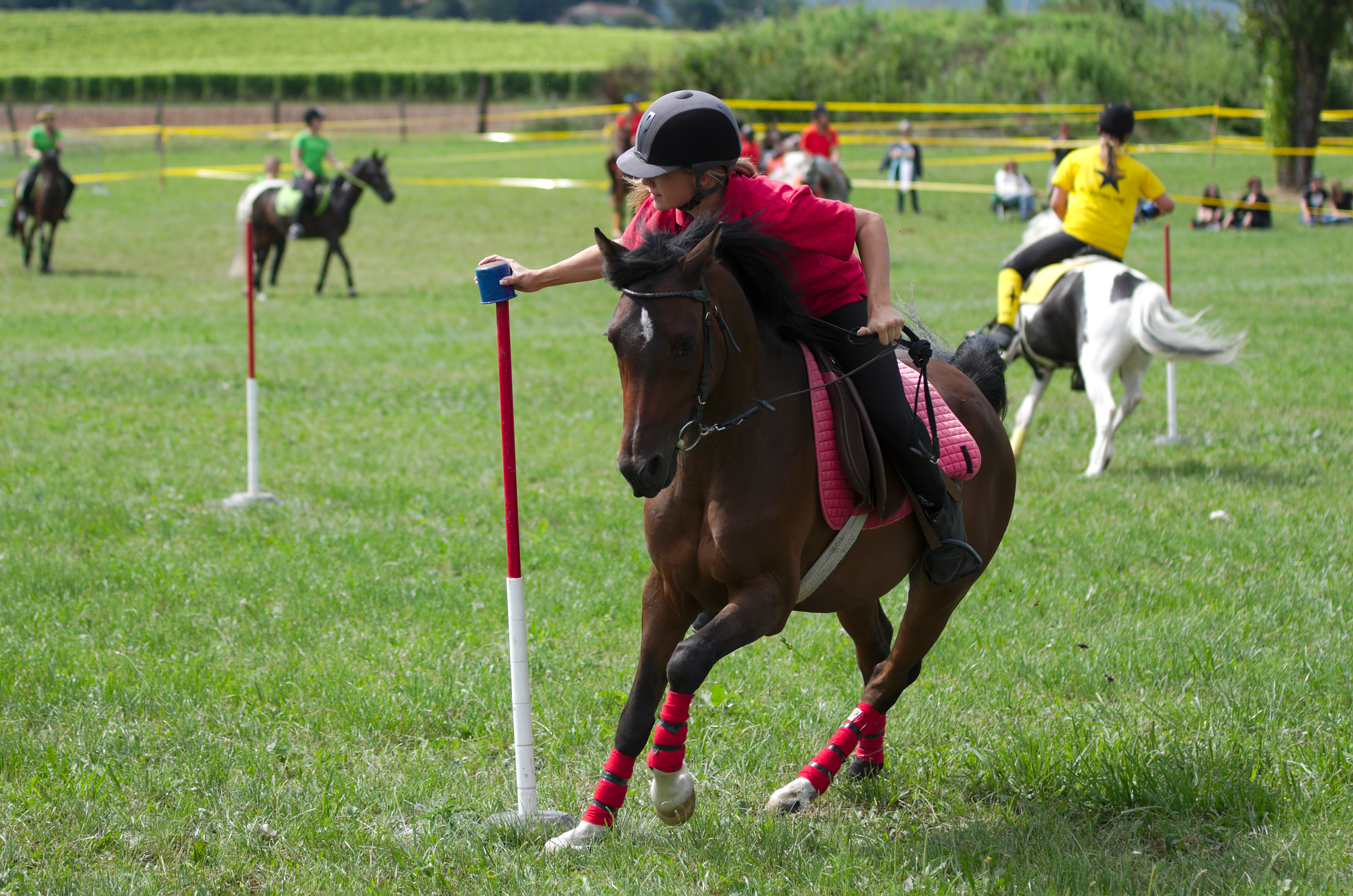
Gymkhana competition, 2013

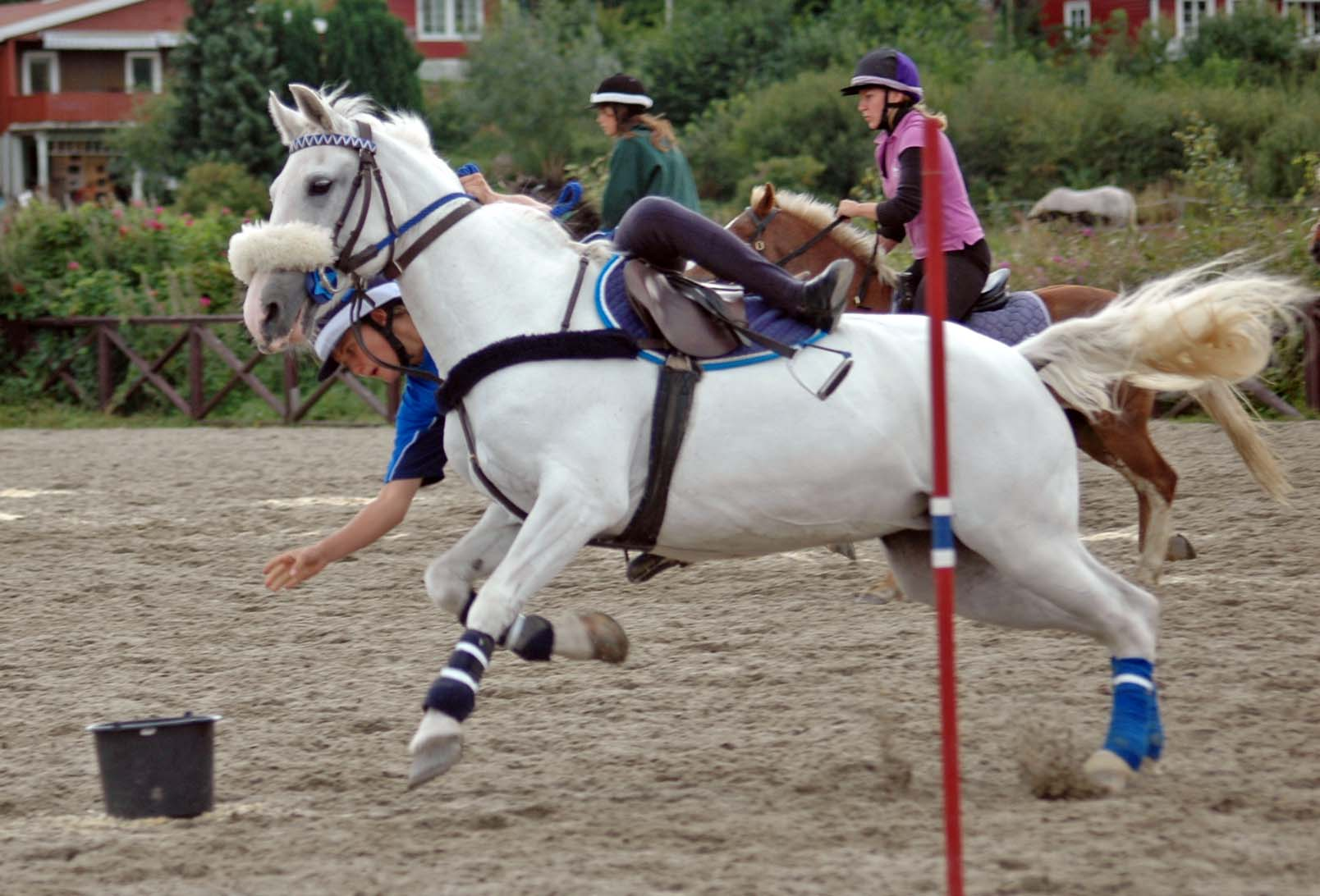
Mounted games at Windsor Castle, 2008

Gymkhana (/ˈdʒɪmˈkɑːnə/) is an equestrian event consisting of speed pattern racing and timed games for riders on horses. These events often emphasize children's participation and may be organized by a recognized Pony Club or a 4-H club. Very small rodeo-like events with little or no prize money, designed for beginners or riders at a local level, are sometimes called playdays. In parts of the western United States, this type of competition is usually called an O-Mok-See. "Gymkhana" is the word used in most of the rest of the English-speaking world, including the United Kingdom, Australia, and both the East Coast and the West Coast of the United States.

== History ==
Mounted games were the inspiration of Prince Philip. When Col. Sir Mike Ansell was Director of the Horse of the Year Show, Prince Philip asked if he could devise a competition for children who could not afford an expensive, well-bred pony, and in 1957 the Horse of the Year Show, then at Harringay Arena in North London, England, staged the first Mounted Games Championship for the Prince Philip Cup—it was an immediate box office success. In 1984, Norman Patrick established the Mounted Games Association of Great Britain to extend the sport beyond Pony Club participation, which was limited to children up through age 14.

== Types of events ==
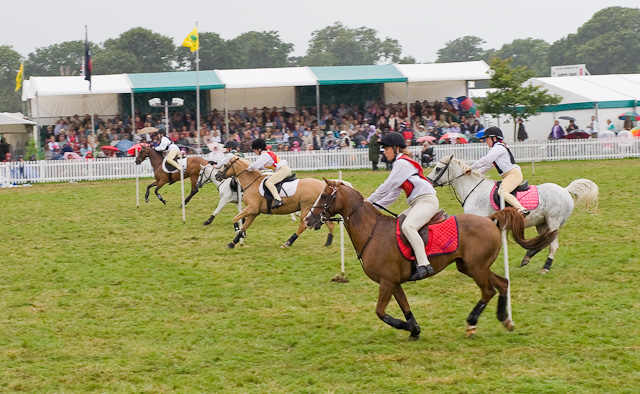
Competitors run in heats against other riders

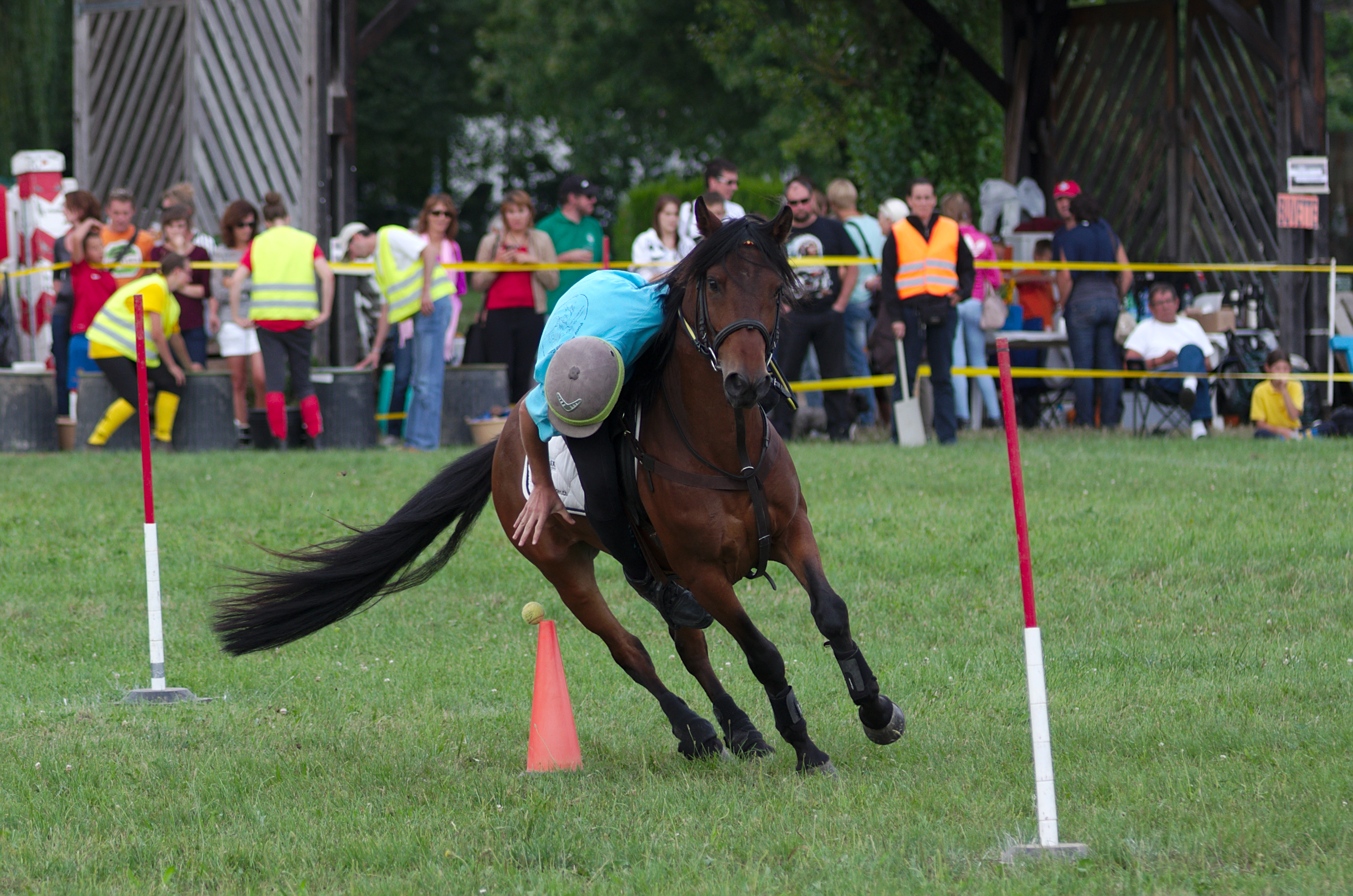
Many of the games involve picking up or placing objects at speed

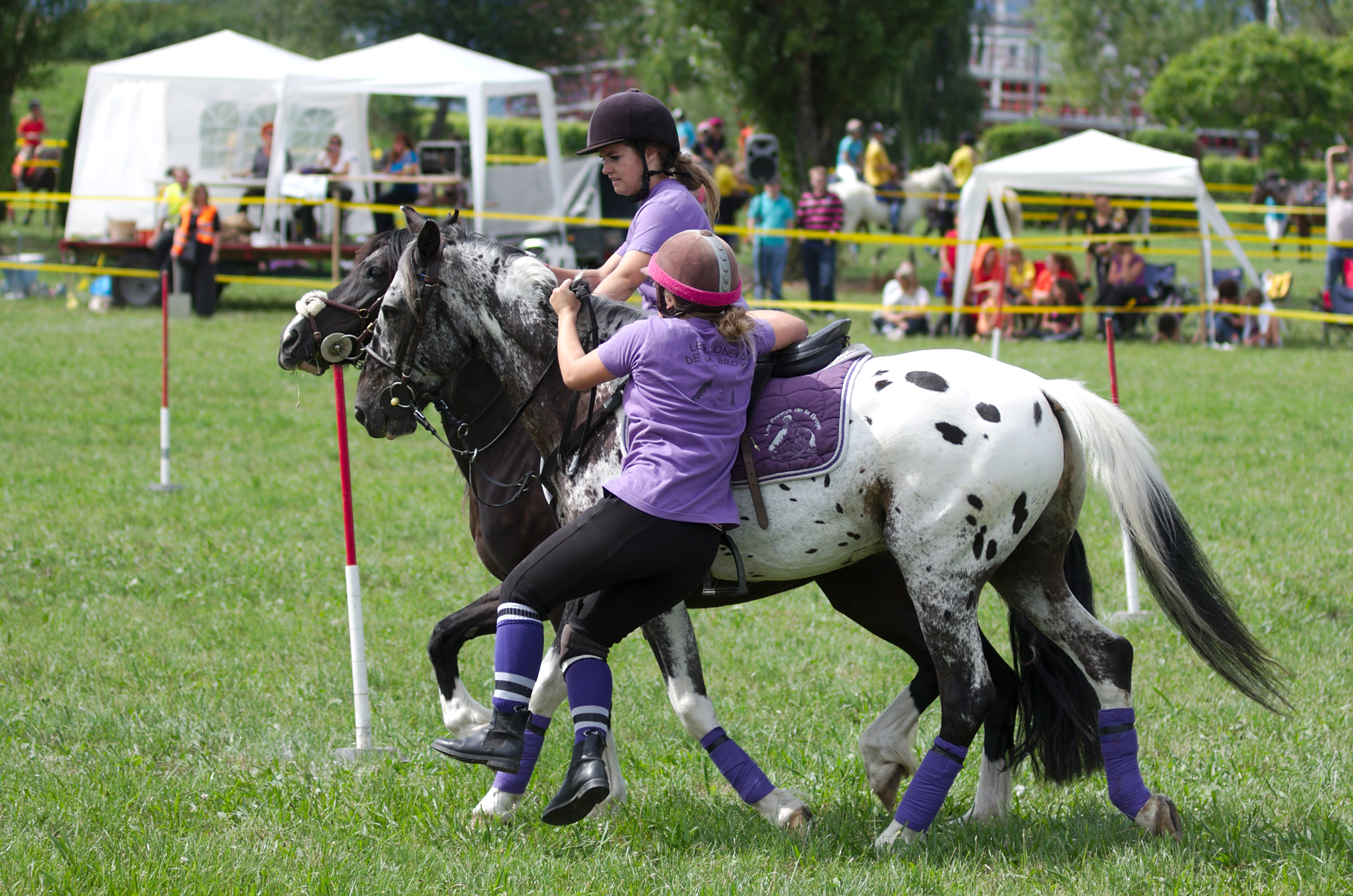
Speed mounting and dismounting is an essential skill

Gymkhana classes are a collection of timed speed events such as; barrel racing, pole bending, keyhole race, keg race (also known as "down and back"), flag racing, a hybrid pattern like mountain cow horse, and stake race. Some organizations include ride and run, musical mats, egg stomp, dollar bill race or "ride a buck", and sack race. Sometimes a goat tying event is included, where the rider will ride up to a goat tied to a stake, jump off, and hog tie the goat.

Most of these events are designed to display precise, controlled actions and tight teamwork between horse and rider at speed, and demonstrate many skills such as flying lead changes, sliding stops and more. Most clubs offer a variety of classes for all ages and abilities of people, allowing riders to compete at the speed level at which they are most capable and comfortable.

A rider must learn to mount quickly (ideally to vault on) and to dismount, also at speed; to carry objects while in the saddle; to ride perfectly balanced without reins, stirrups or saddle, and to think clearly and calmly, and act accordingly.

— Jane Fuller in The Encyclopedia of the Horse

== O-Mok-See ==
O-Mok-See (also spelled omoksee and o mok see) is a term sometimes used in the Western United States for events in the sport of pattern horse racing. Most events are run with contestants simultaneously running in three or four separate lanes, with each contestant riding in a 30 foot wide lane. Other pattern races more commonly held are pole bending and barrel racing.

The origin of the term "O-Mok-See" is thought to specifically originate with the Blackfeet people where they described a particular style of riding as "oh-mak-see pass-kan" meaning "riding big dance". This event was thought to be a war ceremony; before setting out on a mounted expedition against the enemy, the warriors of the camp performed this dance as a part of the prelude of stirring up courage and enthusiasm for battle. The warriors put on their finest dress attire, decorated and painted their best horses, carrying their war bundles, shields, lances and bonnets. They mounted and gathered at some distance out of sight of the camp. They turned and rode together at full speed into the great camp circle, circled around it once and then rode to the center of the camp. In the center were a number of old men and women who sang special songs and beat drums for the horsemen. The horsemen then rode their trained horses to the rhythm of the singers and drummers. From time to time the riders dismounted and danced about on foot beside their horses, shooting in the air and shouting to one another to be brave when the battle came. If anyone fell from his horse during the ceremony it was considered an omen of bad luck.

=== National Saddle Clubs Association ===
The National Saddle Clubs Association (NSCA) was established in January 1965 as the first national organization of saddle clubs. The NSCA held its first national championship show in 1966. The NSCA has adopted and promotes the sport of "pattern horse racing" under the term O-Mok-See. They encourage and allow families to compete together. The NSCA has adopted a set of pattern horse racing events for national competition . some of the events that they run are pole bending, California stake race, polo, key, international flags, Idaho figure-eight and two barrel Flags. There are also 10 or so more events in their rule book. Through standardized rules and regulations for pattern horse racing events, the NSCA's prime purpose and objectives are to promote and cultivate cooperation and friendly relationships between saddle clubs throughout the United States.

== See also ==
- Polo — a team sport on horseback
- Gymkhana — sporting clubs in India, from which the term originally derived
- Gymkhana (motorsport) — a type of motorsport
