= Trail course =

Rodeo event

Trail course is a rodeo event in which a horse and rider attempt to complete a series of obstacles in the fastest time. It combines the horse's athletic ability and the horsemanship skills of a rider in order to safely and successfully maneuver a horse through a series of five obstacles. The rider must remain mounted the entire time. It is similar to trail competition at horse shows, but with emphasis on speed rather than style.

== Modern event ==
Today the trail course is mostly a youth rodeo event. The National Little Britches Rodeo Association (NLBRA) has both a senior girl trail course competition and a junior girl trail course competition. The only difference is the jump is removed from the junior girls' event. Some college rodeo programs also compete in the trail course.

== Obstacles ==
There are five obstacles that must be navigated. The obstacles can be placed in any order, and are usually rearranged between rounds. The obstacles are:

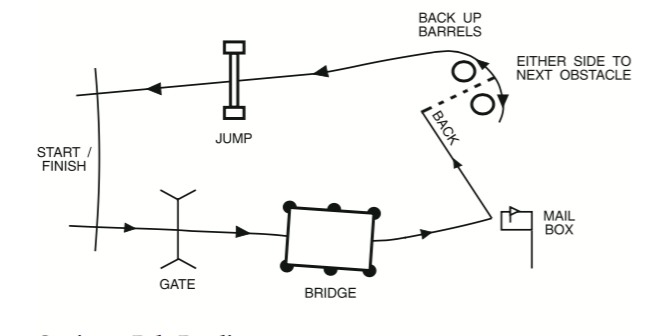
A sample pattern of how the obstacles could be arranged in the Trail Course.

- Bridge - The bridge is six feet long and four feet wide. 3 poles will be placed on each side of the bridge
- Gate - The gate must be at least four feet wide and four feet high. The rider must unlatch the gate, maneuver her horse through the gate and then re-latch the gate, without dismounted.
- Mailbox - A standard metal U.S. postal service approved mailbox is used. The rider must carry a 3 X 5 card. The rider must open the mailbox, deposit the mail, and close the mailbox.
- Back up barrels - Two 55 gallon drums placed 4 feet between them. The rider must back their horse through the barrels.
- Jump - A 1 1/2" PVC pipe is placed at a height of 24 inches. The rider and horse must jump over the pipe.

The course covers about 100 yards in total distance.

== Rules ==
The rider must remain on the horse the entire time. The rider must complete the course in the laid out order and may not skip an obstacle. The rider must carry the 3 X 5 "mail" card with her until she places it in the mailbox.

10 second penalties will be assessed for the following:

- Bridge - if a rider knocks over a pole or fails to cross the bridge.
- Gate - if the rider fails to latch the gate. Or if the rider knocks the gate down.
- Mailbox - if the mailbox does not remain closed. If the horse knocks over the mailbox. If the rider drops the mail.
- Back up barrels - If a barrel is knocked over.
- Jump - If the PVC pipe is knocked over or the horse does not cross the pipe.
