= Pole bending =

Rodeo event with six poles

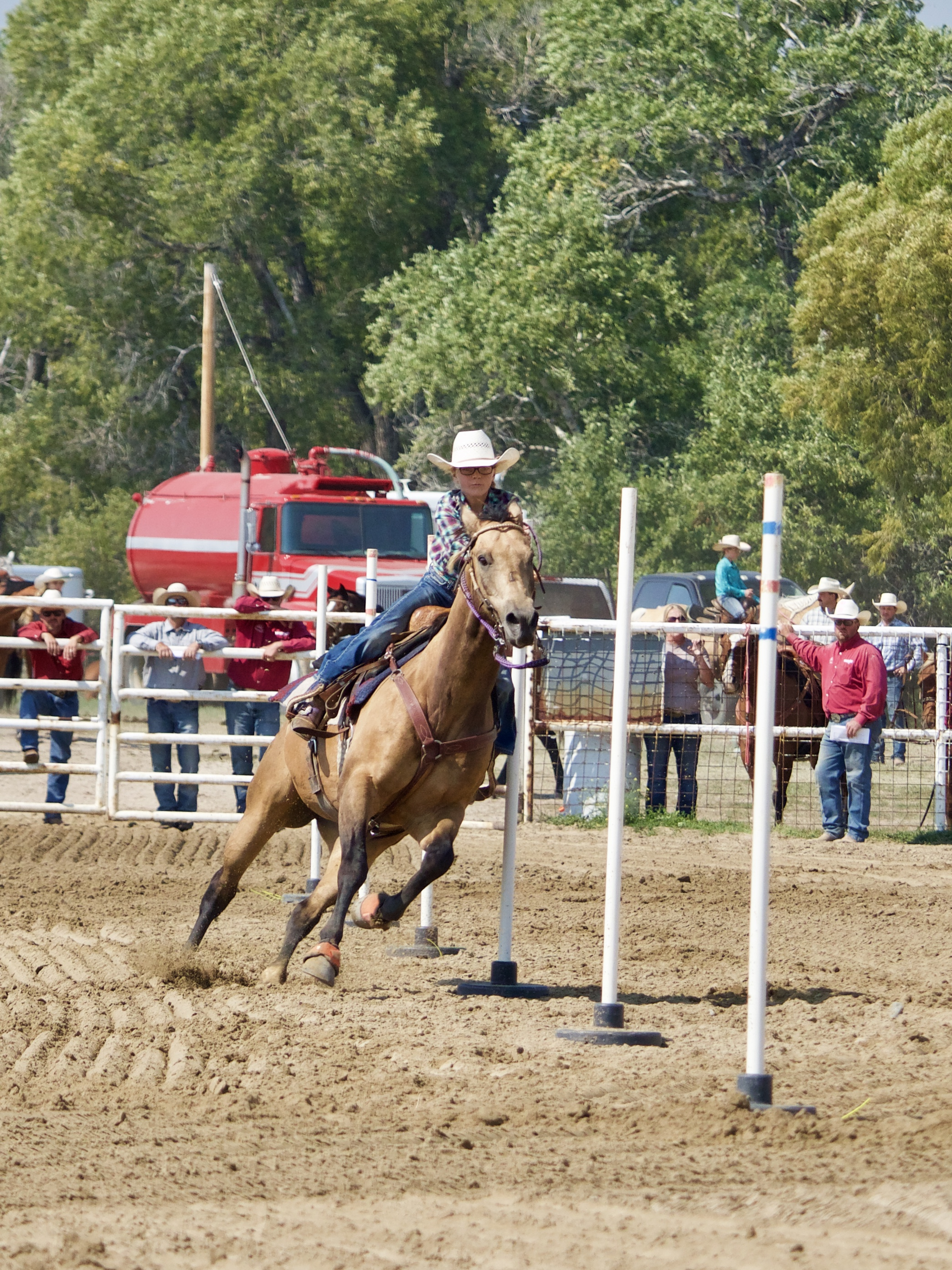
- Pole bending

Characteristics
- Mixed-sex: Generally female, some males, particularly at youth levels
- Type: Rodeo; Gymkhana/O-Mok-See
- Equipment: Horse, horse tack
- Venue: Indoor or outdoor riding arena

Presence
- Country or region: United States, Canada, Mexico

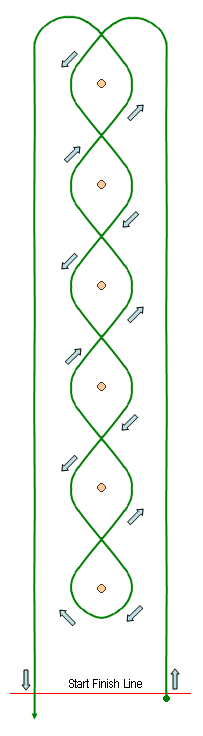
course layout

Pole bending is a rodeo timed event that features a horse and one mounted rider, running a weaving or serpentine path around six poles arranged in a line. This event is usually seen in youth and high school rodeos, 4-H events, American Quarter Horse Association, Paint and Appaloosa sanctioned shows, as well as in many gymkhana or O-Mok-See events.

== Nez Perce Stake Race ==
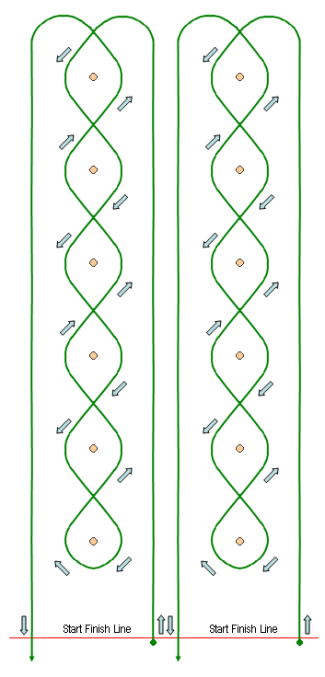
Nez Perce Stake Race course

The Nez Perce Stake Race is a type of pole bending race which is also a match race: two horses race on identical courses laid out side-by-side, with the loser eliminated and the winner moving up the brackets to race the other winners. It is not a timed event. It is one of five game classes approved for horse club shows by the Appaloosa Horse Club (ApHC). The ApHC rules state that racing competition is traditional to the Nez Perce Native American people. However, it is unclear if this particular competition is derived from any traditional competition.
