= Flag racing =

Rodeo event

Flag racing is a youth rodeo and O-Mok-See event for children in the United States in which a horse and rider attempt to complete a pattern around preset barrels in the fastest time. The contest must deposit a flag in one bucket and remove a flag from another bucket.

== Modern event ==
The pattern for Flag Racing.

The National Little Britches Rodeo Association (NLBRA) has both a Little Wrangler (coed ages 5–8) Flag Racing competition and a Junior Boy (ages 9–13) Flag Racing competition.

== Rules ==
The rider is given a flag before the start of the race. The contestant must race toward the first barrel and place the flag in the bucket. Then the contestant must race to the second barrel and remove a flag from the second bucket. Finally, the rider must race back to the finish line.

The contestant will be disqualified for any of the following:

- Knocking over a bucket or barrel
- Dropping a flag
- Crossing the finish line without the flag from the second bucket.
