= Goat tying =

Youth rodeo event

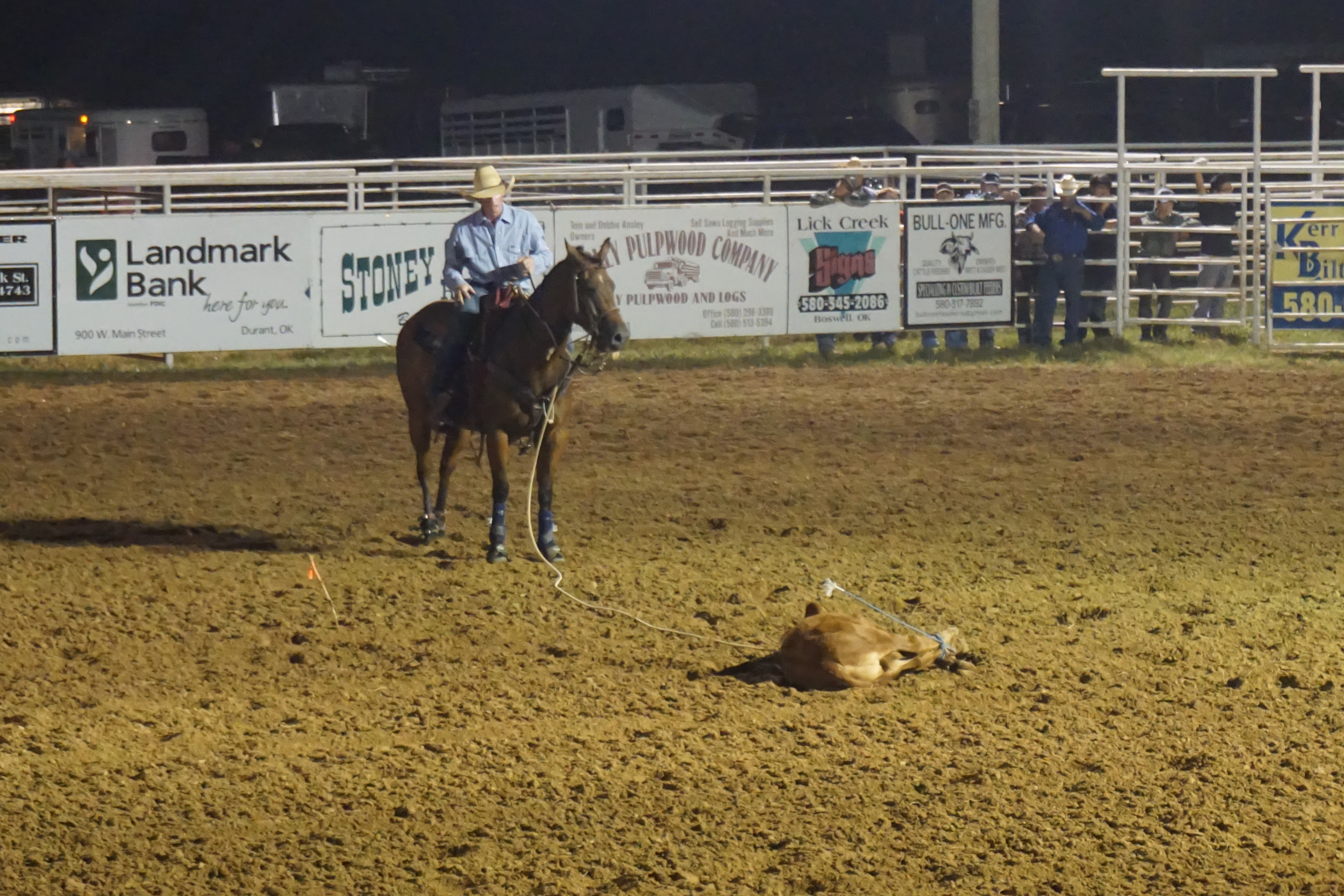
Goat tying at the 2018 Boswell FFA Rodeo in Boswell, Oklahoma

Goat tying is a rodeo event in which the participant rides to a tethered goat, meaning that they are attached to a stake with a rope. Then the participant gets off their horse, while the horse is still moving, then runs up to the goat, flanks it, then will gather three of its legs, and tie them with one wrap, and a hooey (tie). The goat must stay tied for six seconds after the contestant has backed away from the animal. If the goat becomes untied before six seconds have passed, the rider receives no score. A participant may be disqualified for undue roughness while handling the goat, touching the goat after the tie, or after signaling completion of the tie, or the contestant's horse coming in contact with the goat or tether while the contestant has control of the horse.

Goat tying is not seen in professional rodeo, but is a common event in youth, high school and college rodeo levels. In most cases, it is considered a women's event, especially at the college level. Male athletes participate in the goat tying event until the age of 12, after which they transition to calf tying.

== Event ==
The object is to race to the end of the rodeo arena to a goat staked out on a 10 feet (3.0 m) rope, run to the goat on the line, flank the goat, then gather 3 of its legs and tie them together.The distance from the starting line to the stake varies, but is usually 100 feet or so. Contestants dismount their horse while it is running, run to the staked-out goat, which must be taken to the ground and laid on its side in order to tie three of its legs together. The rope used is a nylon or cotton rope with an approximate length of four feet, called a "goat string." There are two main types of strings, rope and braided. Rope strings come in 2 and 3 ply, meaning 2 or 3 strands of rope are twisted to create the goat tying string, this type is generally less flexible and most common among contestants. The braided string is a flimsy type, though more flexible, resembling a thick braided shoelace. Beeswax or rosin is used to preserve the longevity of the string and help the tie hold longer. When the goat is tied, contestants signal the end of their run by throwing their hands up and getting off the goat to indicate the completion of the run. The contestant with the fastest time wins.

There are penalties that may be added to the contestant's run at the judge's discretion, including disqualification if the goat comes untied during the 6-second tie period, and a 10-second penalty (depending on the rodeo sanctioning organization) added to a time if the horse crosses the staked rope of the goat or causes the goat to become loose. If the contestant touches the goat or string after indicating that they are finished, they will receive a no time. Also, after the contestant is finished tying, they must move at least three feet away from the goat.

Depending on the level of competition, a winning time could be in the range of seven to nine seconds.

There is some controversy as to whether goat tying is harmful for the goat. Veterinarians have described the process of flanking (throwing the goat to the ground) as "inflicting extreme fear and stress" on the goat and note that many goats vocalize or cry until released. While collegiate programs like Texas Tech impose limits — such as capping the number of ties per goat per day and removing visibly stressed animals — critics argue that youth riders, especially when unsupervised, may exceed these limits, increasing the risk of harm.

Physical injuries specific to goat tying are not well-documented, but advocacy groups cite concerns about repeated impacts on small animals during practice sessions. Major animal welfare organizations, including the ASPCA and In Defense of Animals, have publicly opposed goat tying. The ASPCA asserts that such events "do not promote humane care and respect for animals", while In Defense of Animals has called the event "abusive," citing concerns over goats being "slammed" and "tethered by their necks".

However, professional rodeo organizations, such as the Professional Rodeo Cowboys Association (PRCA), aim to enforce strict animal welfare standards with regulations that require a licensed veterinarian to be on-site for all performances and slack sessions, ensuring immediate care for any injured or distressed goats. As a result, goat tying remains ethically controversial, with its acceptability depending largely on enforcement, supervision, and broader views on animal use in sport.

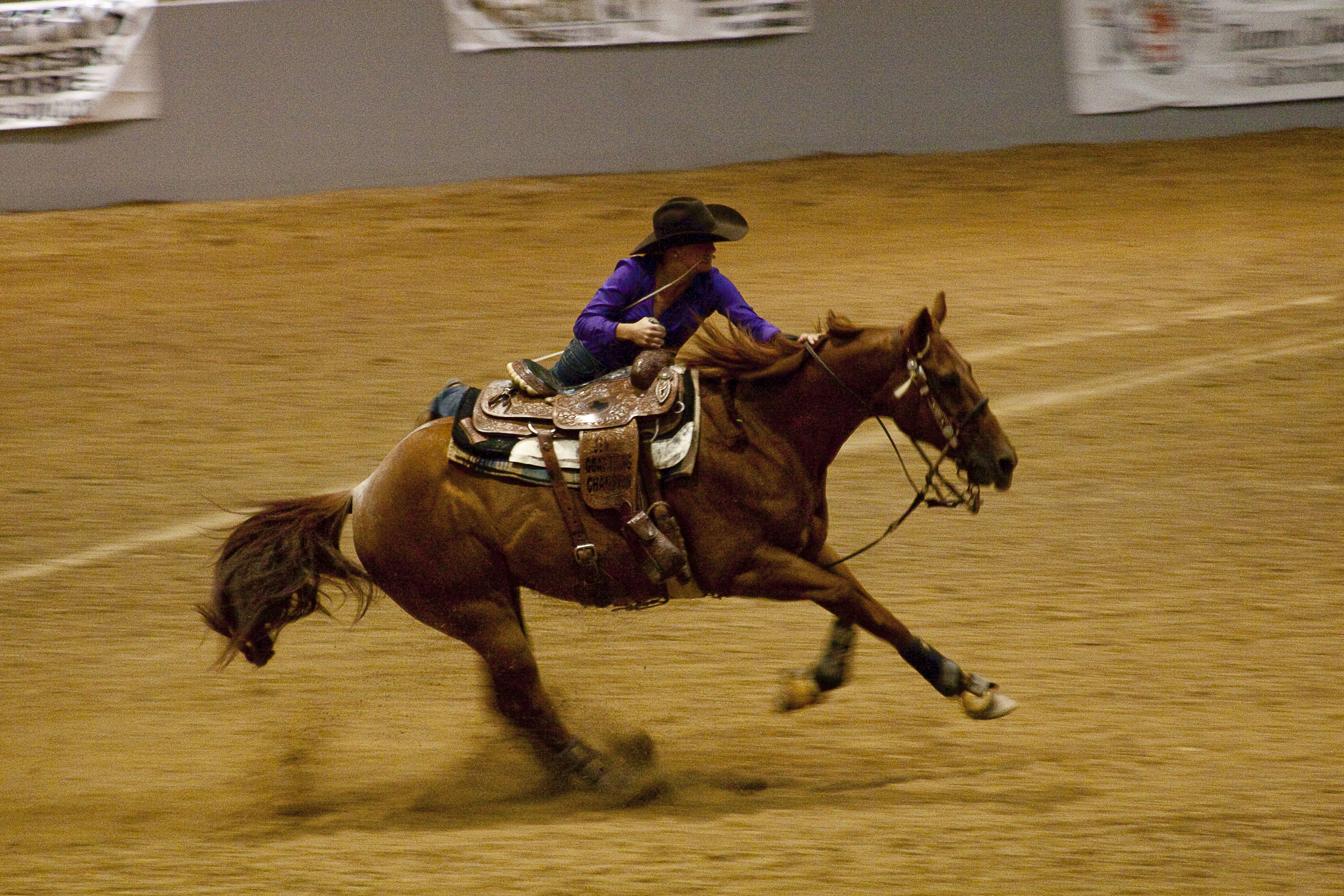
A rider on horseback races down the arena and dismounts, often while the horse is still moving

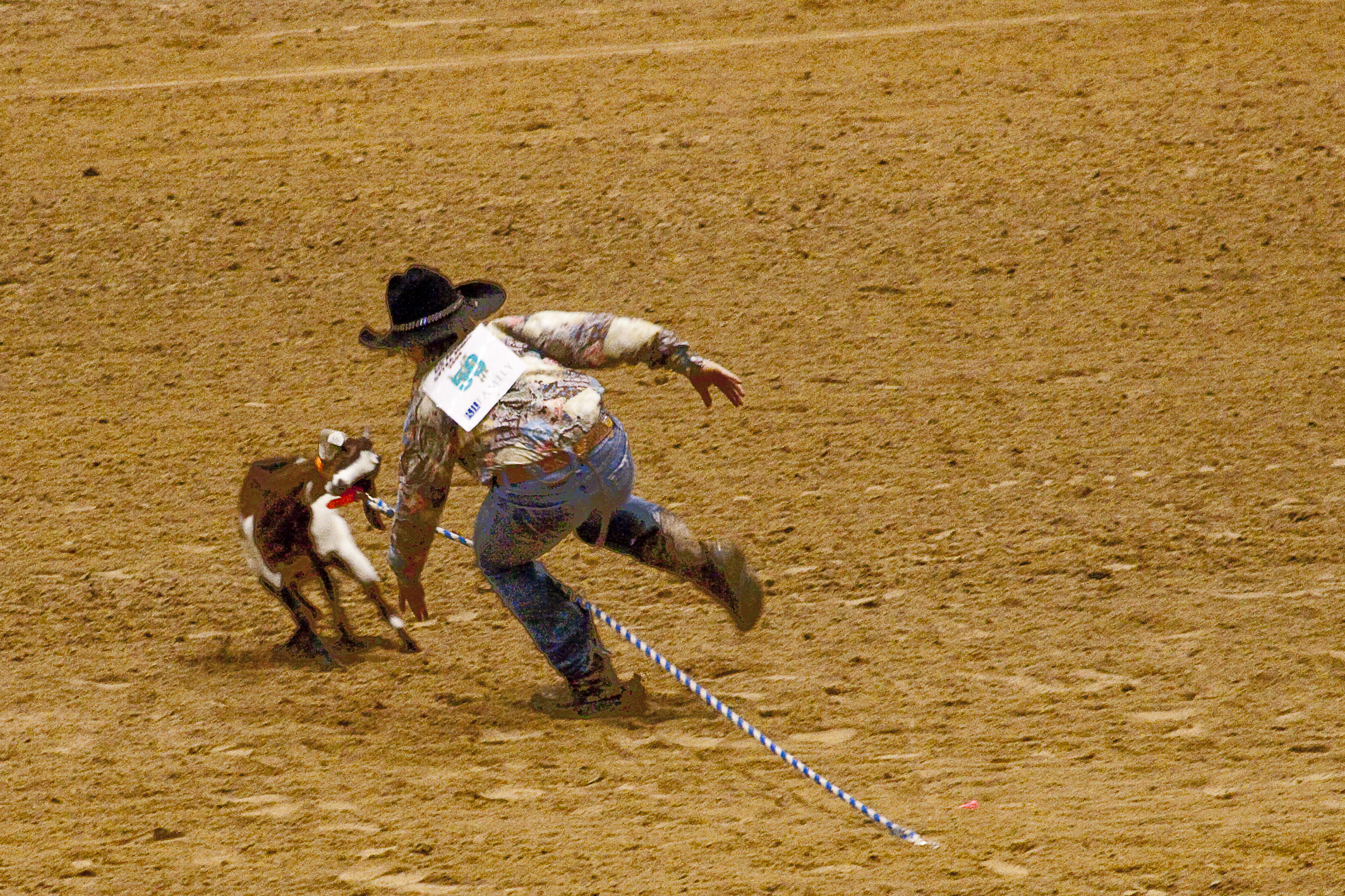
The competitor runs to the goat

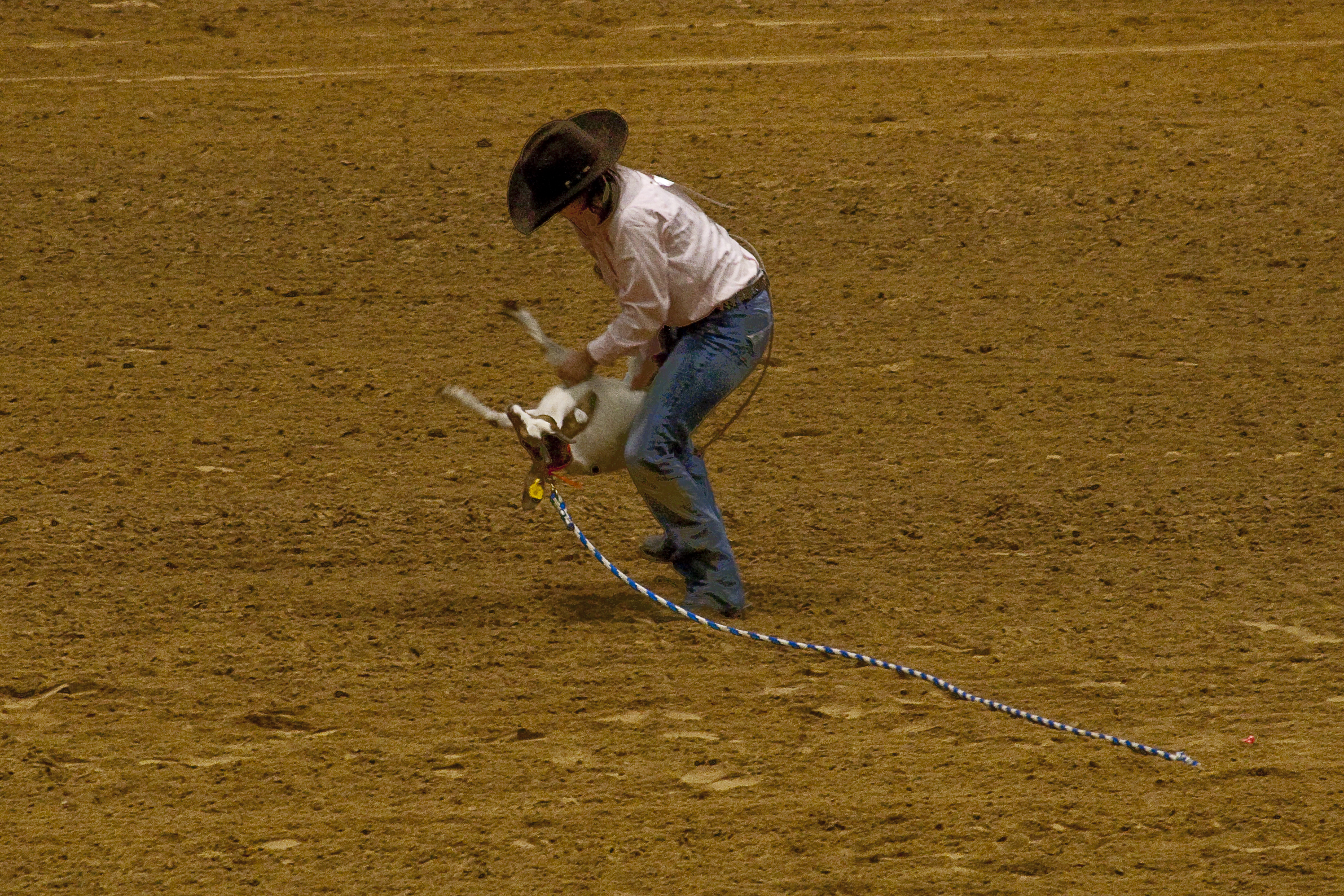
The competitor throws the goat to the ground in order to tie its legs

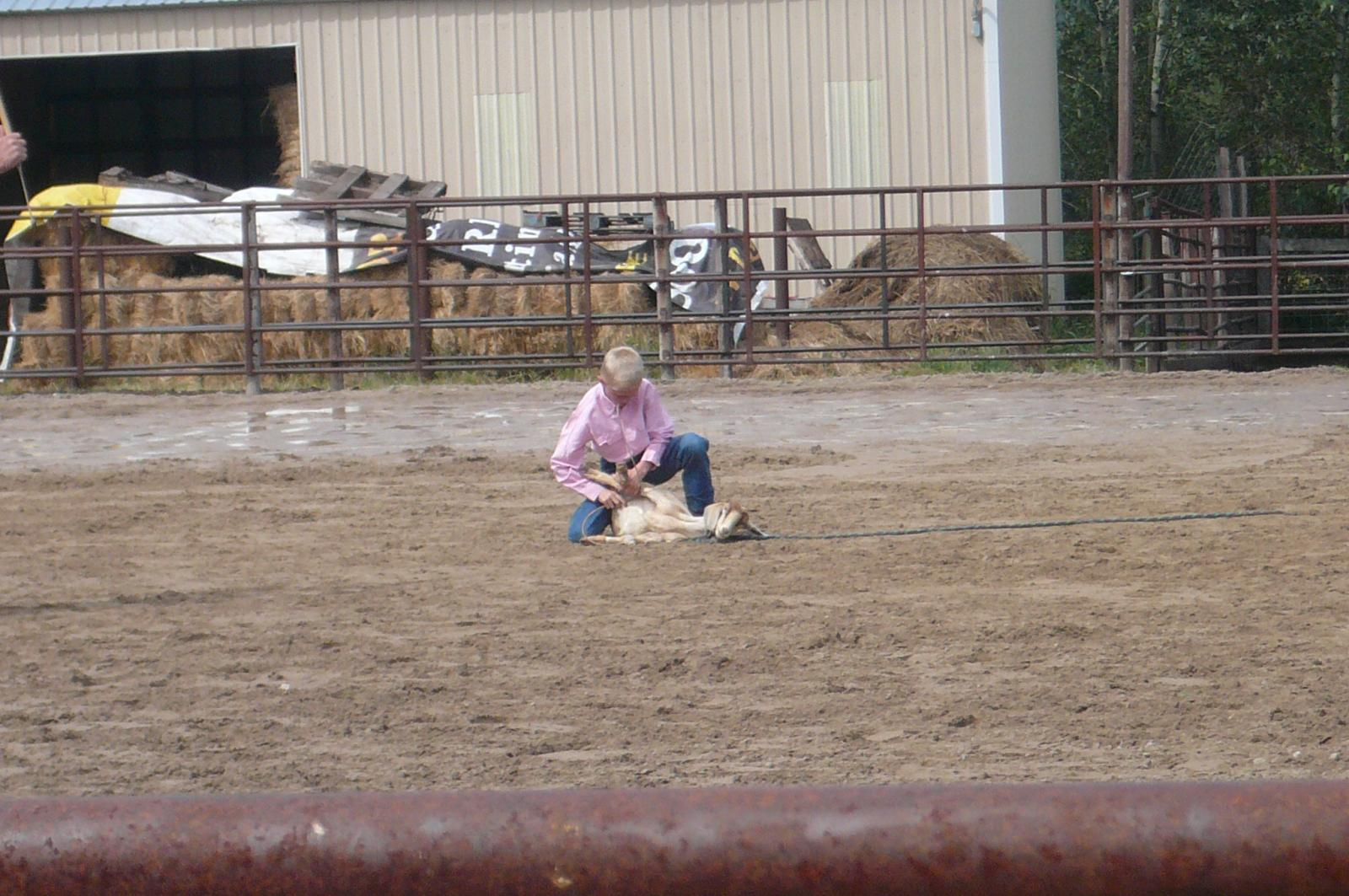
The competitor ties together three legs of the goat

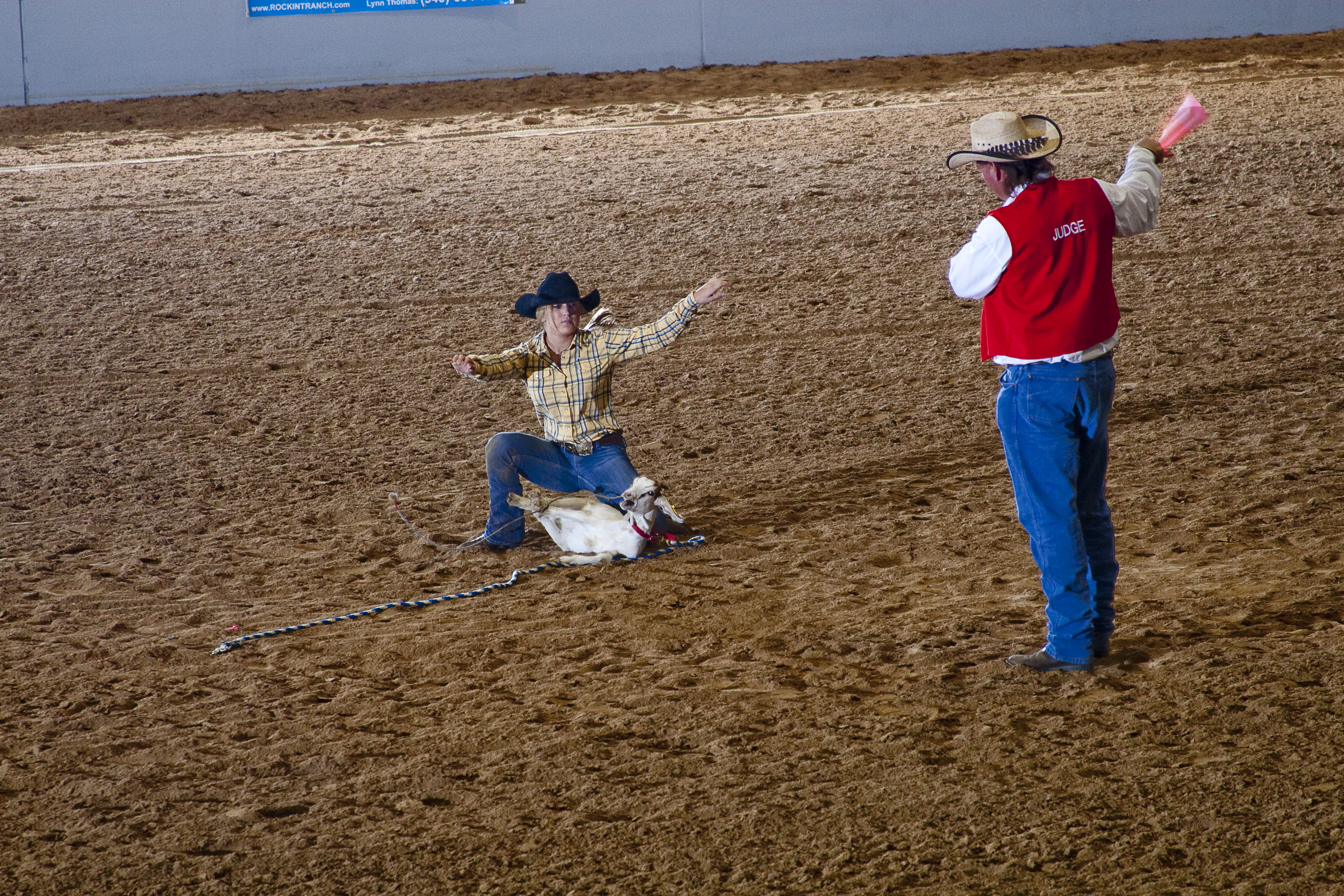
The competitor raises her hands in the air to stop the clock and record her time

== See also ==
- Barrel racing
- Breakaway roping
- Dally ribbon roping
