= Women's Professional Rodeo Association =

Women's rodeo sanctioning body

- Sport: Rodeo
- Founded: 1948
- Countries: United States; Canada; Australia
- Most recent champion: (United States) Kassie Mowry (barrel racing)
- Website: WPRA.com

The Women's Professional Rodeo Association (WPRA) is one of the largest rodeo sanctioning bodies in the world and is open exclusively to women eighteen years of age and older. Headquartered in Colorado Springs, Colorado, the Association currently has over 3,000 members from all over the contiguous United States, Canada, and Australia.

In 2004, WPRA members competed for nearly $5 million in total prize money at rodeos in the United States and co-sanctioned Canadian Professional Rodeo Association (CPRA) events in Canada.

== History ==
Formed as the Girls Rodeo Association (GRA) in 1948, several of the original members were female ranchers who had been forced to take over family operations as husbands, fathers, and brothers were called to service in World War II.

Though women had played an important role in rodeo's formative years in the mid-to-late nineteenth century, competing and winning against their male counterparts, by the time of the GRA's formation women's role in rodeo had been reduced to beauty pageants, with prizes (instead of prize money) such as cigarette cases. These women were exceptionally competent riders and ropers, whose skills had been honed working the open ranges of the American west, and they found it demeaning to be pushed to the extreme edges of rodeo.

On February 28, 1948, determined to stake their own special place in rodeo, 38 women met in San Angelo, Texas, to form the GRA, with the primary purpose of advancing the position of women in rodeo everywhere. They drafted rules and created a point system for determining year-end champions. Then they went to work, persuading rodeo committees and producers to hold women's contests according to GRA rules. Committees were given the option of choosing which event they would hold, and most picked barrel racing. In its inaugural year, the GRA had 74 members and held 60 events.

In its first year, it paid out $29,000 to contestants. In the beginning, the women were performers in the events of calf roping, bronc riding, and barrel riding. The events and membership grew, and in 1981, the name of the Association was officially changed from the GRA to the WPRA. Their next major goal was to promote equality between the women's barrel race and the other events held at PRCA rodeos by demanding prize money equal to the other men's events. They achieved their goals in 1985, becoming the first professional women's sports organizations to have fiscal equality with their male counterparts. The WPRA is now the "oldest women's sports association in the country and the only one governed entirely by women".

== Current events and structure ==
The WPRA's primary sanctioned event is barrel racing. Contestants on horseback run a cloverleaf pattern around three barrels set in a triangle in the arena. The quickest time determines the winner, with five second penalties assessed for each tipped barrel.

The majority of the WPRA's barrel racing events are held in conjunction with Professional Rodeo Cowboys Association (PRCA) events. Contestants are ranked nationally, based on how much money they earned in competition. The top fifteen contestants at the end of the regular rodeo season are invited to compete at the PRCA's National Finals Rodeo (NFR), held in December each year to determine the world champion in each event. Barrel racing has been a part of the NFR since 1967.

The WPRA also has an All Women's Division which sanctions rodeos exclusively for women. These All Women's rodeos feature four events - breakaway calf roping, tie-down calf roping, team roping, and barrel racing. Contestants count points earned in competition to qualify for the WPRA World Finals formerly held each autumn at Cowtown Coliseum in Fort Worth, Texas. Since 2014, the event has taken place at the Extraco Events Center in Waco, Texas.

Since 2019, breakaway roping has been part of some PRCA events, making it along with barrel racing the two women's rodeo events. The WPRA breakaway roping world championship used to be determined at the WPRA World Finals. However, since 2020, the National Breakaway Finals (NBF) has been held to determine the WPRA's world champion breakaway roper.

== See also ==
- Lists of rodeo performers
- Bull Riding Hall of Fame
- Professional Bull Riders
- Professional Rodeo Cowboys Association
- ProRodeo Hall of Fame
- American Bucking Bull
- International Professional Rodeo Association
- Bull Riders Only
- Championship Bull Riding
- Canadian Professional Rodeo Association
- Federación Mexicana de Rodeo
- Australian Professional Rodeo Association
