= Head start (positioning) =

Advance position in a competition or task

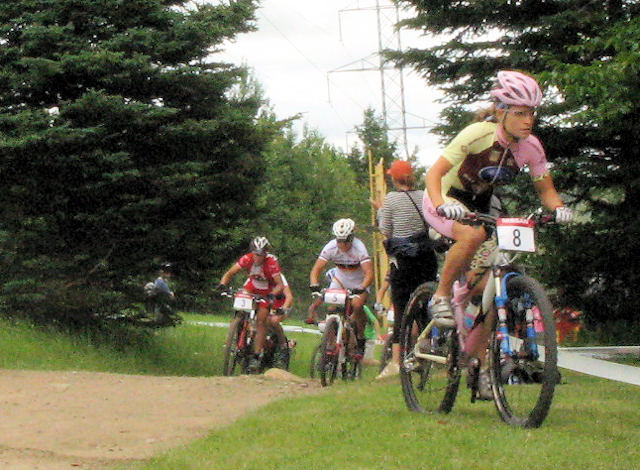
A head start may help a competitor win a race.

A head start is a start in advance of the starting position of others in the competition, or simply toward the finish line or desired outcome. Depending on the situation, a head start may be inherent, obtained by special privilege, earned through one's accomplishments, or granted mercifully by an opponent.

While not guaranteeing success, a head start will increase such chances.

== In sports ==
In competitive sports, such as a race, a head start refers to a start ahead of other competitors, allowing a shorter distance to the finish line.

The idea of a head start may seem unfair. But in some cases, a head start is an advantage that may be earned by one more of the competitors.

Also, adults who are racing against children may provide children with a head start, knowing the children are slower, and wanting to allow them a chance to win.

In multiple-event or multiple-day competitions, such as the modern pentathlon, the final event may use a head start where the leader of the competition starts first over his opponents based on the time or points advantage. In modern pentathlon, the points leader after the first four events takes a head start in the 3,000-meter cross country event based on his lead over his opponent. The first competitor to the finish line wins.

=== In baseball ===
In baseball, base runners who are attempting to steal bases or advance more bases in the event of a hit may attempt to get a head start off their base before the pitcher throws his pitch. This may be risky, as the pitcher could throw the ball to the respective infielder, and if the runner cannot get back before the ball arrives in the hands of the infielder, the runner may be picked off.

=== In cricket ===
In cricket, a nonstriker can leave his ground early to run to the other ground more quickly for the purpose of scoring runs. This can be countered by the bowler "mankading" the nonstriker i.e. hitting the wicket in the nonstriker's ground with the ball to run the nonstriker out. A similar thing can occur to the striker, who can be stumped by the wicketkeeper if he leaves his ground in order to hit the ball, or more quickly run to the other ground. In either case, the relevant batsman will not be out if they return to their ground before the wicket in that ground has been hit.

== In traffic ==
In traffic, at a red light, many motorists will start to inch up in anticipation of the light turning green (watching the signal of the perpendicular traffic). This will give them a head start on other motorists on the road.

== In achieving a goal ==
A head start could be an improved start in an attempt to achieve some goal, such as in one's education or the completion of a task. In such cases, the head start is usually earned by working harder or by using more efficient means of reaching that point.

== See also ==
- Handicapping
- False start
- Pole position
