= Breakaway roping =

Rodeo event

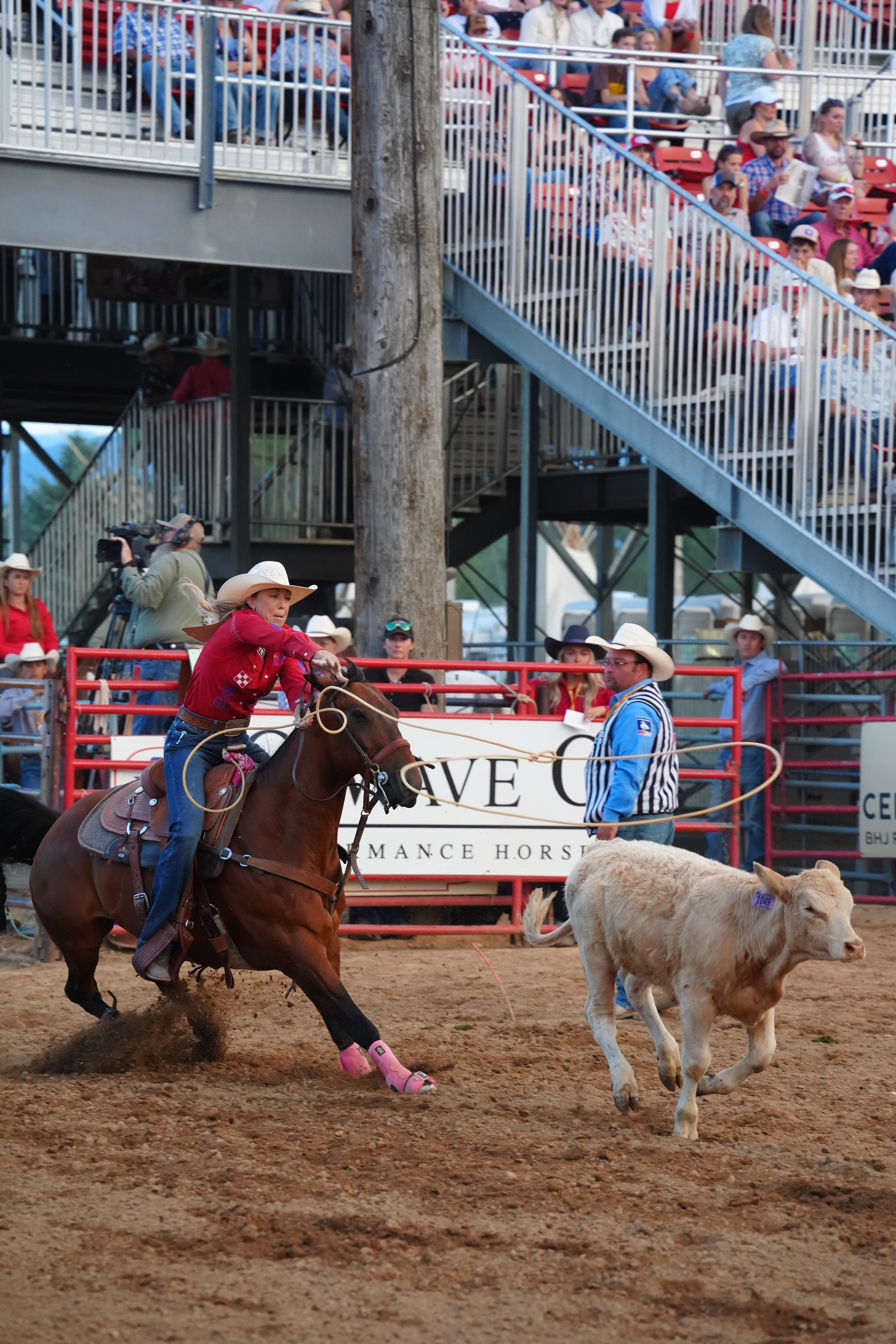
A breakaway roper lassos a calf

Breakaway roping is a variation of calf roping where a calf is roped, but not thrown and tied. It is a rodeo event that features a calf and one mounted rider. The calves are moved one at a time through narrow runs leading to a chute with spring-loaded doors. The horse and rider wait in a box next to the chute that has a spring-loaded rope, known as the barrier, stretched in front. A light rope is fastened from the chute to the calf's neck, releasing once the calf is well away from the chute and releasing the barrier, which is used to ensure that the calf gets a head start. Once the barrier has released, the horse runs out of the box while the roper attempts to throw a lasso around the neck of the calf.

Once the rope is around the calf's neck, the roper signals the horse to stop suddenly. The rope is tied to the saddle horn with a string. When the calf hits the end of the rope, the rope is pulled tight and the string breaks. The breaking of the string marks the end of the run. The rope usually has a small white flag at the end that makes the moment the rope breaks more easily seen by the timer. The fastest run wins.

The most common penalty in breakaway roping is the 10 seconds added when a roper breaks the barrier, failing to give the calf the appropriate head start. Breakaway ropes may also be flagged out (disqualified) for any catch other than a bell-collar catch—that is, a clean catch around the calf's neck.

At the collegiate, semi-professional, and professional levels, breakaway roping is exclusively a women's event, but at the junior and high school levels, competitors can be both male and female. Some amateur rodeos also have breakaway roping as part of their event line-up. It is also used as a substitute for calf roping in some parts of Europe, where traditional calf roping, also called tie-down roping, is banned.

In 2019, the Professional Rodeo Cowboys Association (PRCA) started including Women's Professional Rodeo Association (WPRA) sanctioned breakaway roping at some of their events, making it along with the standard WPRA barrel racing the two rodeo events for women. Since 2020, the year-end National Breakaway Finals (NBF) has been held to determine the WPRA World Champion breakaway roper. As of 2024, breakaway roping is held in approximately 500 PRCA rodeos.
