= Team roping =

Competitive rodeo team sport

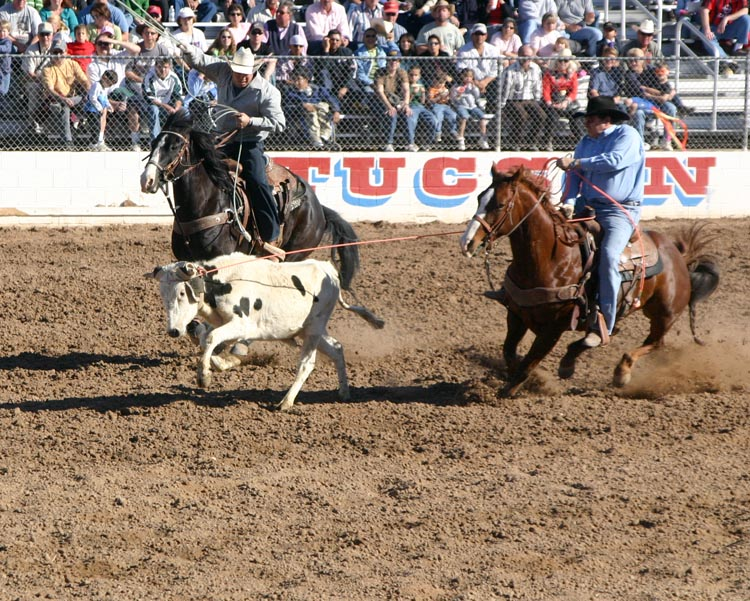
Team roping consists of two ropers; here, the header has roped the steer and is setting up to allow the heeler to rope the back legs of the steer.

Team roping, also known as heading and heeling, is a rodeo event that features a steer (typically a Corriente) and two mounted riders. The first roper is referred to as the "header", the person who ropes the front of the steer, usually around the horns. It is also legal for the rope to go around the neck, or around one horn and the nose, resulting in a catch known as a "half- headed". Once the steer is caught by one of the three legal head catches, the header must dally (wrap the rope around the rubber-covered saddle horn) and use their horse to turn the steer to the left.

The second roper is the "heeler", who ropes the steer by its hind feet after the "header" has turned the steer. A five-second penalty is added to the final time if only one leg is caught. Team roping is the only rodeo event where men and women may compete together and equally in professionally sanctioned competition, in both single-gender or mixed-gender teams.

== Origins ==
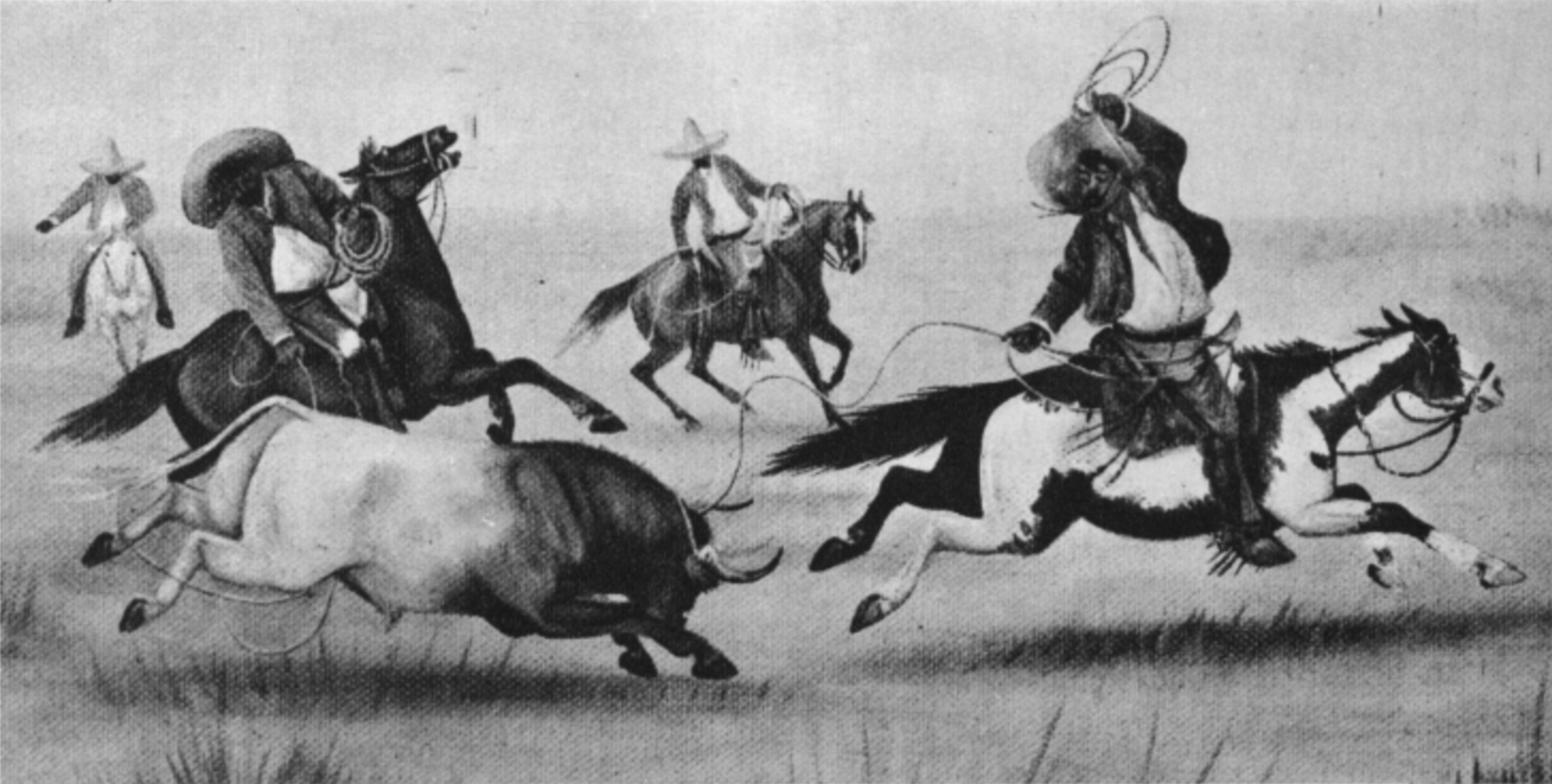
Mexican vaqueros team roping wild fighting bull on the open range

Mexican vaqueros originally developed this technique on working ranches when it was necessary to capture and restrain a full-grown animal that was too large to handle by a single rider. Over time, the acitivty evolved into a competitive sport. As the sport has grown, a numbering system was added to rate each roper's individual skill level. The numbers go from one to ten (1–10) for headers and one to ten (1–10) for heelers. This system allows for handicapping to create a more balanced competition. Today there are tens of thousands of amateur ropers who compete for millions of dollars in prize money.

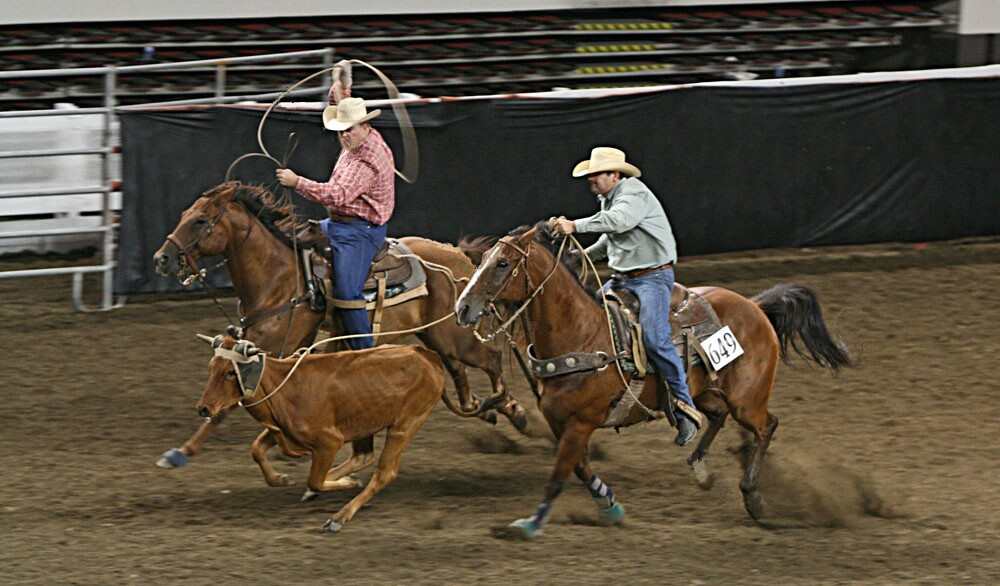
Team ropers in an indoor competition

== Equipment ==
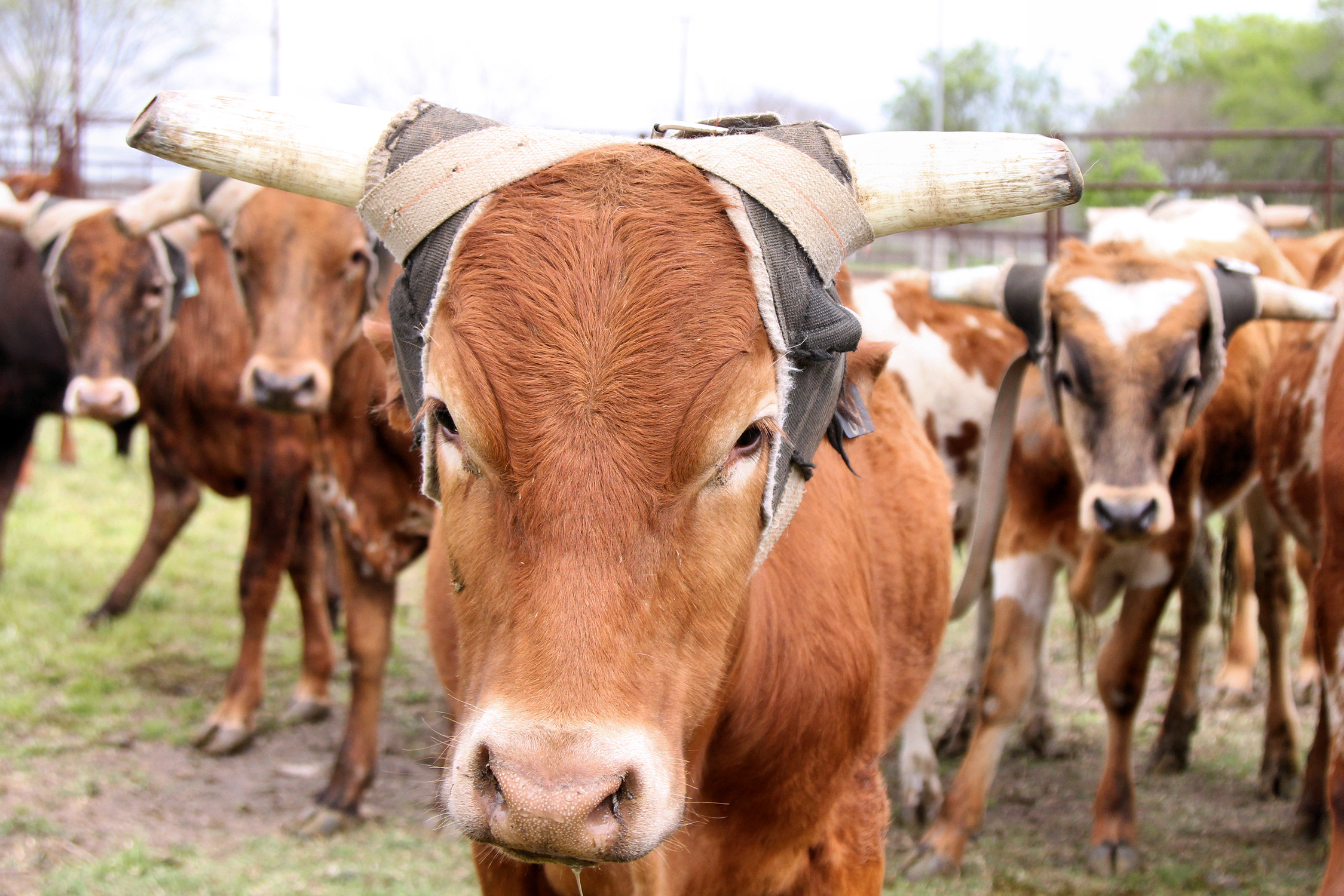
Roping steers wear special protective horn wraps to protect the ears and head from rope burns.

There is specialized equipment used by team ropers:

- Rope - made of synthetic fibers, used to rope the steer, there are two kinds of ropes, one for the header (the person who ropes the head) and one for the heeler (the person who ropes the legs). The header's rope is usually 30 to 32 feet in length and is a lot softer (softer means the rope has more elasticity and flexibility). The heeler's rope is usually 35 or 36 feet in length and is a lot stiffer (meaning it contains less flexibility and is more rigid to catch the feet).
- Horn wraps - protective wraps that go around the horns of the steer to prevent rope burns and reduce the risk of a horn breaking when roped.
- Roping gloves - worn to prevent rope burns on the hands of the riders.
- Western saddle - Roping saddles have a particularly strong design with double rigging and other specialized features, including a rubber wrap around the saddle horn to keep the dally from slipping, and usually a wooden rawhide-covered saddle tree or a reinforced fiberglass tree.
- Bell boots and brushing boots are placed on the horses' legs for protection.

== Modern event ==
Steers used for roping are moved from a holding corral through a series of narrow alleyways that lead to the roping arena. The alleyways allow the steers to be lined up in single file. Then, one at a time, a steer is moved into a chute with spring-loaded doors in front and a solid gate behind, so that only one animal is released at a time. On each side of the chute is an area called the box that is big enough to hold a horse and rider. The header is on one side (usually the left, for a right-handed header) whose job is to rope the steer around the horns, then turn the steer so its hind legs can be roped by the "heeler", who starts from the box on the other side of the chute.

Watch the header (right) rope the horns and pull the steer into position for heeler (left) to rope the hind legs.

A taut rope, called the barrier, runs in front of the header's box and is fastened to an easily released rope on the neck of the steer of a designated length, used to ensure that the steer gets a head start. An electronic barrier, consisting of an electric eye connected to a timing device, is sometimes used in place of the barrier rope.

When the header is ready, they signal for the steer to be released and an assistant pulls a lever, opening the chute doors. The freed steer breaks out running. When the steer reaches the end of the rope, the barrier releases. The header must rope the steer with one of three legal catches: a clean horn catch around both horns, a neck catch around the neck or a half-head catch around the neck and one horn. The header then takes a dally, a couple of wraps of the rope around the horn of the saddle. Some ropers have lost fingers in this event. Once the header has made the dally, the rider turns the horse, usually to the left, and the steer will follow, still running.

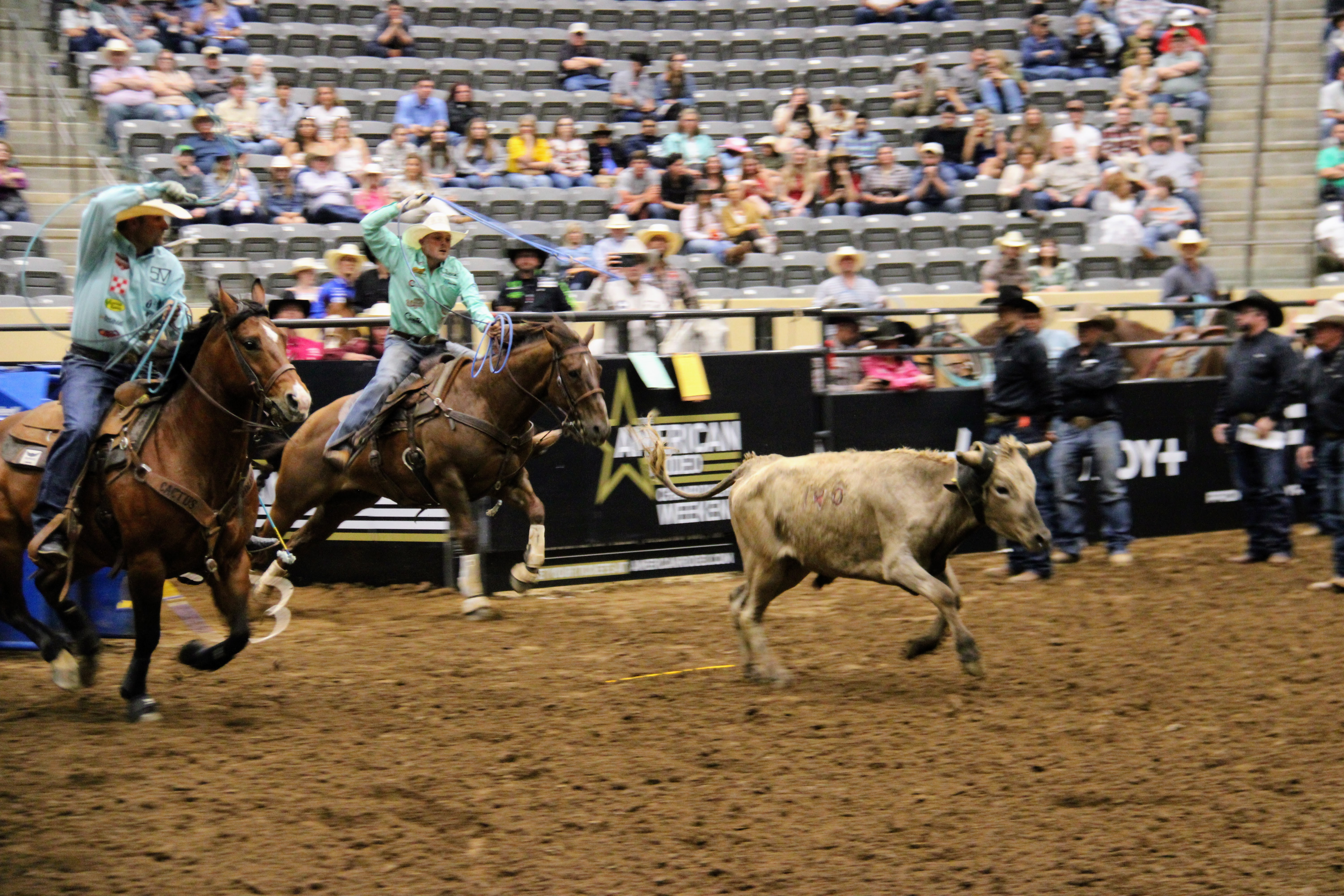
Team ropers compete at the 2026 American Rodeo East Regional, which took place April 10–11 in Lexington, Kentucky, at Alltech Arena on the grounds of the Kentucky Horse Park.

The heeler waits until the header has turned the steer. When they have a clear throw, the heeler throws a loop of rope under the running steer's hind legs and catches them. As soon as the heeler also dallies tight, the header turns their horse to directly face the steer and heeler. Both horses back up slightly to stretch out the steer's hind legs, immobilizing the animal. As soon as the steer is stretched out, an official waves a flag and the time is taken. The steer is released and trots off. There is a 5-second penalty for roping only one hind leg and a 10-second penalty for breaking the barrier; if both occur on the same run then the penalties are added together for a total of 15 seconds added.

A successful professional-level team takes between 4 and 8 seconds to stretch the steer, depending on the length of the arena. At lower levels, a team may take longer, particularly if the heeler misses the first throw and has to try again. At higher levels, the header and the heeler are allowed only one throw each; if either misses, the team gets no score.

In some round-robin format competitions the header and heeler are awarded points for each catch instead of timing the run. This puts emphasis on consistency rather than speed. These types of competitions are often more attractive to newer ropers where they can focus on catching rather than having a fast run.

== Rules ==
There are various organizations that sanction team roping events at local, regional and national levels. Some of the rules common to most groups include:

- Both riders must start from inside the box
- If the barrier is broken there is a 10-second or 5-second penalty depending on organization
- If the Heeler catches only one leg there is a 5-second penalty
- The Heeler cannot throw unless the head of the steer is turned.
- The header has three possible legal catches:
1. Both horns
2. One horn and the nose (half-head)
3. The neck
- Any other head catch is considered illegal.

== Ropes ==
A modern rope is usually made of a blend of nylon and poly fibers, though some classic styles are still made of rawhide. Most synthetic ropes are generally quite stiff at the time of purchase, but come in various grades. For beginners, headers start with an extra soft (xs) or an extra, extra soft (xxs) rope. Heelers usually also start with a harder rope. Ropes come in a number of different variations of stiffness. from softest to stiffest there is the extra extra soft (xxs), extra soft (xs), soft (s), medium soft (ms), medium (m), hard medium (hm), and medium hard (mh).

== Technique ==
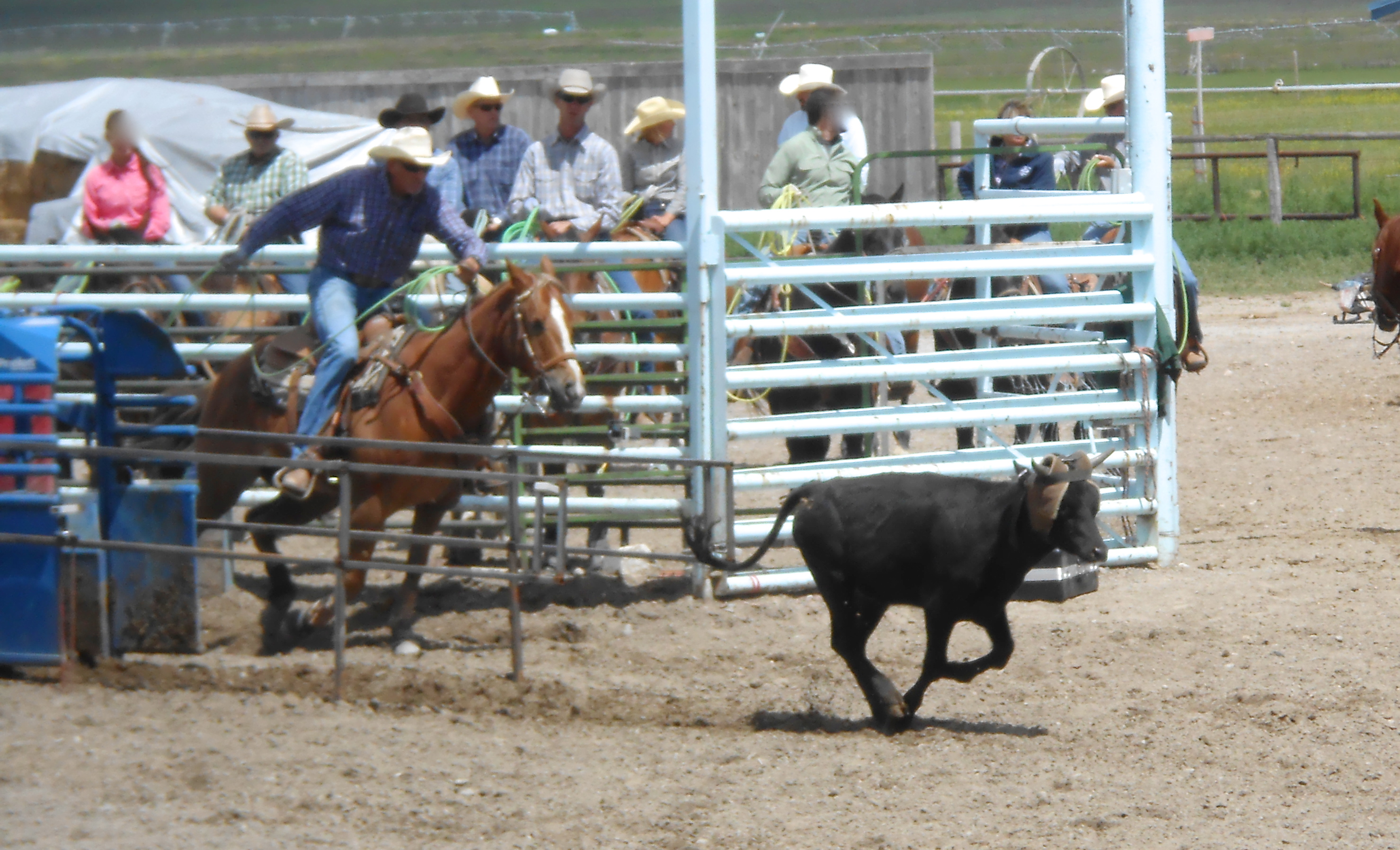
Steer is released from chute with a slight head start, horse and rider emerge from box when steer is a predetermined distance out

Headers swing their loops overhead in a smooth and controlled, flat motion, and they aim for the back of the steer's head and release the loop. When the roper releases, they are to stop the hand open, flat, and palm down at the point where the loop is thrown. Heelers use a different technique, a right-handed heeler will swing the loop angled on the left side of the rider's body, keeping the tip of the loop to the left. This ensures that when the loop is thrown, it will go under the steer legs. Heeling is all about timing; the tip of the loop has to be open and fully thrown as the steer's legs are coming forward. The lay of the loop is also very important; it should stand up against the steer's legs with the bottom loop on the ground so the steer will jump right into it.

== See also ==
- Rodeo
- Steer wrestling
- Steer roping
- Calf roping
- Dally ribbon roping
