= Calf roping =

Rodeo event

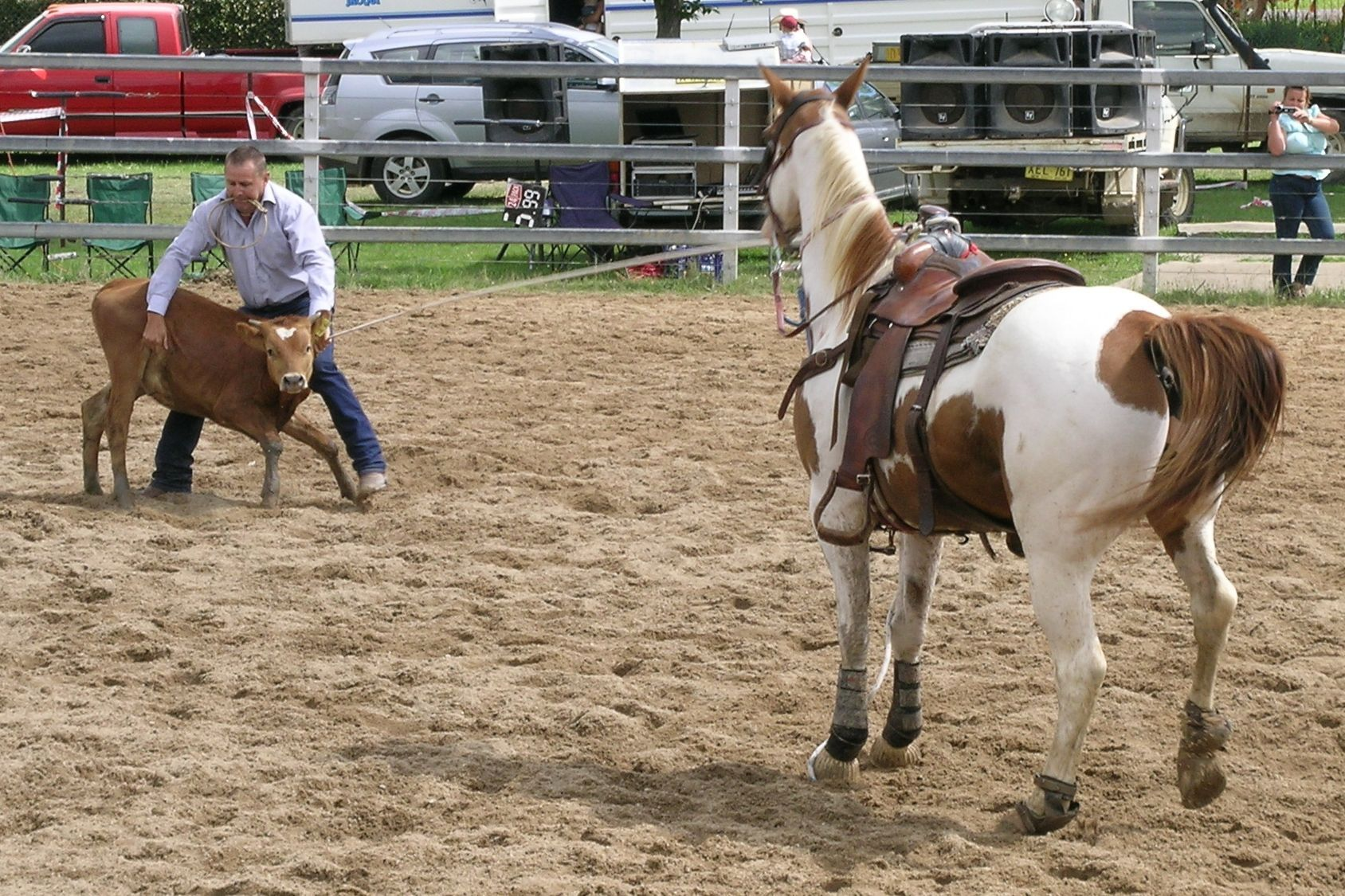
Calf roping in modern competition

Calf roping, also known as tie-down roping in the United States and Canada and rope and tie in Australia and New Zealand, is a rodeo event that features a calf and a rider mounted on a horse. The goal of this timed event is for the rider to catch the calf by throwing a loop of rope from a lariat around its neck, dismount from the horse, run to the calf, and restrain it by tying three legs together, in as short a time as possible. A variant on the sport, with fewer animal welfare controversies, is breakaway roping, where the calf is roped, but not tied.

== Origin ==
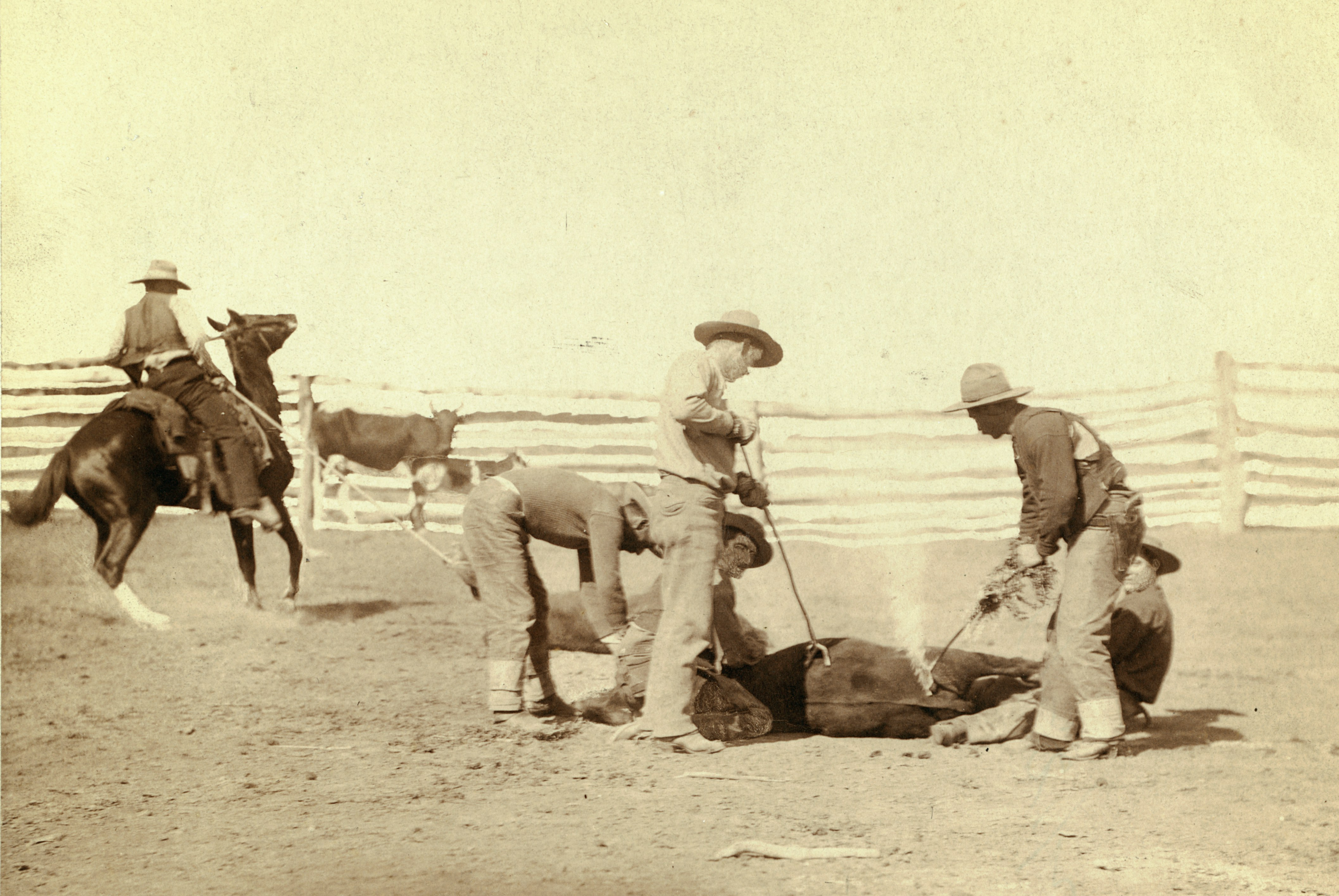
Calf roping as a rodeo event had its origin in ranch work.

The event derives from the duties of actual working cowboys, which often required catching and restraining calves for branding or medical treatment. Ranch hands took pride in the speed with which they could rope and tie calves which soon turned their work into informal contests.

== Modern event ==
The calves are lined up in a row and moved through narrow runways leading to a chute with spring-loaded doors. When a calf enters the chute, a door is closed behind it and a lightweight 28-foot (8.5 m) rope, attached to a trip lever, is fastened around the calf's neck. The lever holds a taut cord or "barrier" that runs across a large pen or "box" at one side of the calf chute, where the horse and rider wait. The barrier is used to ensure that the calf gets a head start. When the roper is ready, he or she calls for the calf, and the chute operator pulls a lever opening the chute doors and releasing the calf. The calf runs out in a straight line. When the calf reaches the end of the rope, that trips the lever, the rope falls off the calf, and the barrier for the horse is released, starting the clock and allowing horse and rider to chase the calf.

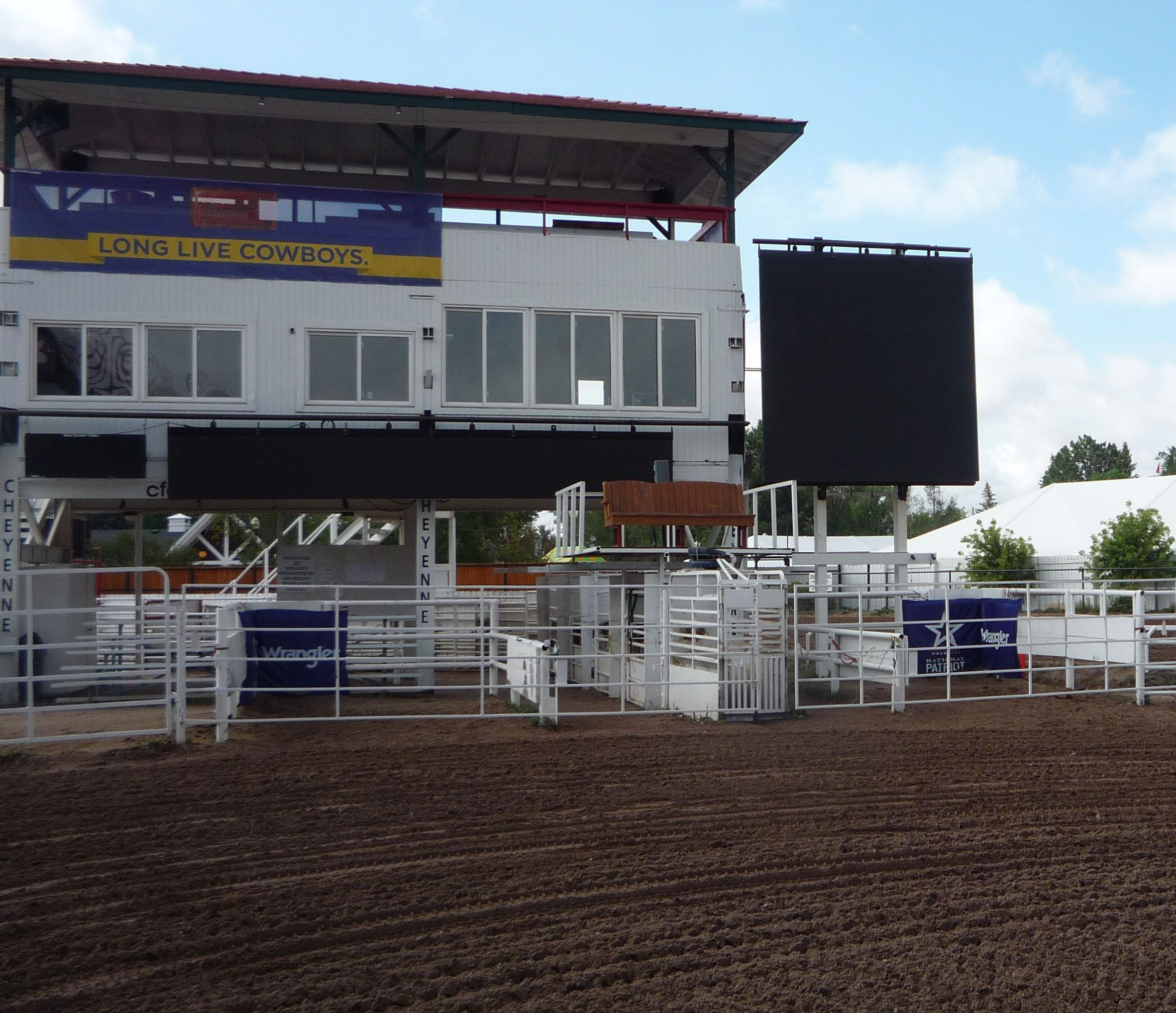
Chute 9 at Cheyenne Frontier Days for timed events

Timing is critical. From a standstill, a rider will put his horse into a gallop from the box shortly after the calf leaves the chute, so that the horse saves valuable seconds by being at near-full speed the moment the barrier releases. However, if the rider mistimes his cue to the horse and the horse breaks the barrier (known as the "Hallettsville Barrier") before it releases, a 10-second penalty will be added to his time. This is sometimes referred to as a "Cowboy Speeding Ticket."

The rider must lasso the calf from horseback by throwing a loop of the lariat around the calf's neck. Once the rope is around the calf's neck, the roper signals the horse to stop quickly while he dismounts and runs to the calf. The calf must be stopped by the rope but cannot be thrown to the ground by the rope. If the calf falls, the roper loses seconds because he must allow the calf to get back on its feet. When the roper reaches the calf, he picks it up and flips it onto its side. Once the calf is on the ground, the roper ties three of the calf's legs together with a short rope known as a tie-down rope or "piggin' string". A half hitch knot is used, sometimes referred to colloquially as "two wraps and a hooey" or a "wrap and a slap". The piggin' string is often carried between the roper's teeth until he uses it. The horse is trained to assist the roper by slowly backing away from the calf to maintain a steady tension on the rope.

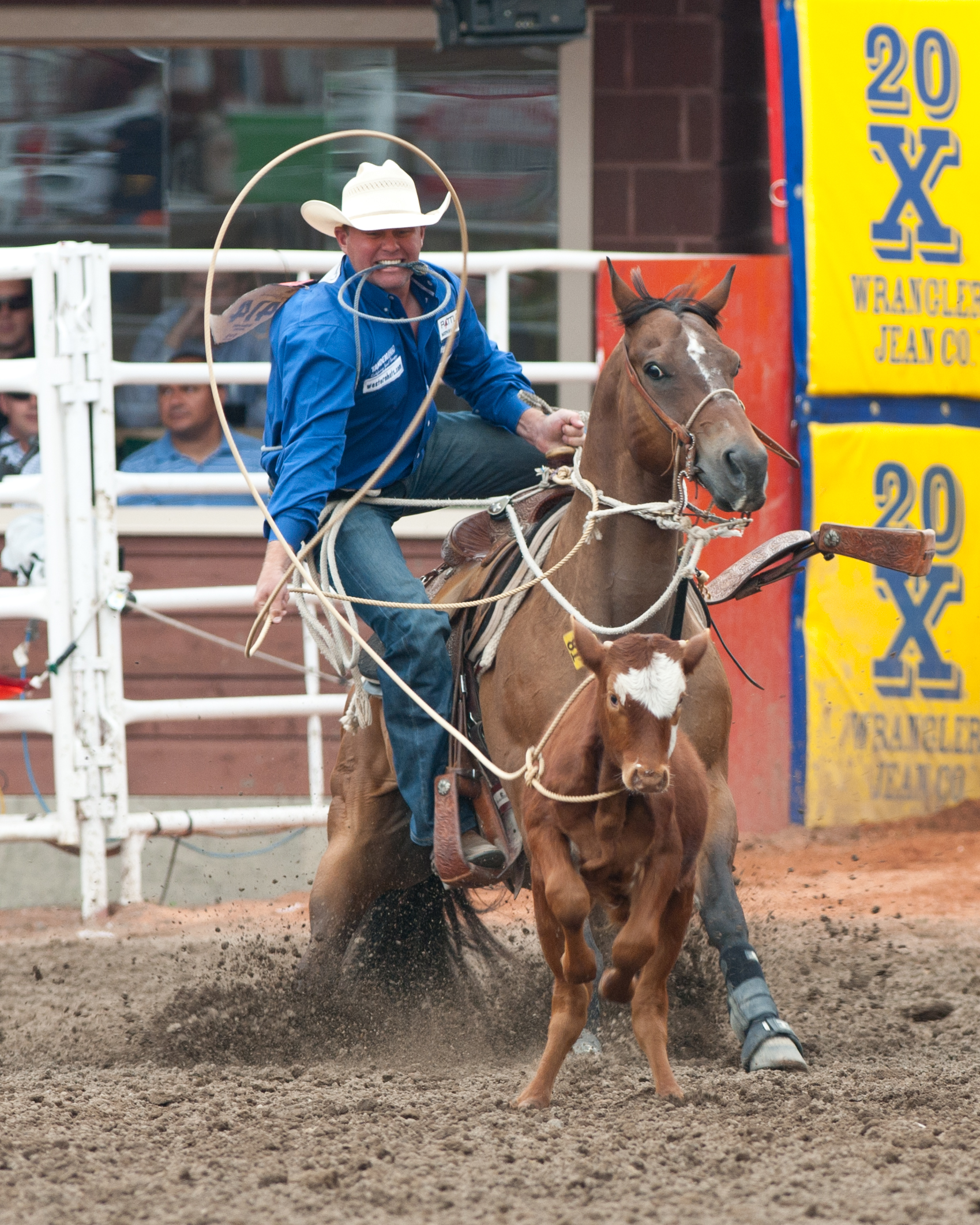
Calf roping event at the Calgary Stampede

When the tie is complete, the roper throws his hands in the air to signal "time" and stop the clock. The roper then returns to his horse, mounts, and moves the horse forward to relax the tension on the rope. The timer waits for six seconds, during which the calf must stay tied before an official time is recorded. After the six seconds, two officials then tend to the calf by untying it and letting it exit the arena. Top professional calf ropers will rope and tie a calf in seven seconds. The world record is just over six seconds.

== Organizations and regulations ==
The event is recognized by most rodeo organizations such as the Professional Rodeo Cowboys Association (PRCA) and the International Professional Rodeo Association (IPRA). In the United States, there are two organizations that promote calf roping alone: the National Calf Ropers Association (NCRA) and Ultimate Calf Roping (UCR). Other timed rodeo events that use cattle include breakaway roping, where the rider ropes but does not throw the calf; steer wrestling; and team roping, which uses adult cattle.

In PRCA events, the calf must weigh between 220 and 280 pounds. Calves must be strong and healthy; sick or injured livestock cannot be used. According to the PRCA, "Most calves do not compete more than a few dozen times in their lives because of weight and usage restrictions and the fact that calves grow so rapidly."

== Animal welfare issues ==
There are concerns over the welfare of the calves used in professional rodeo, and the industry itself polices events closely, penalizing competitors who "jerk down" a calf with the rope or flip it over backwards. In 1994, a survey of 28 sanctioned rodeos was conducted by on-site independent veterinarians. Reviewing 33,991 animal runs, the injury rate was documented at 0.047%, or less than five-hundredths of one percent.

A study of rodeo animals in Australia found a similar injury rate. Basic injuries occurred at a rate of 0.072 percent, or one in 1405, with injuries requiring veterinary attention at 0.036 percent, or one injury in every 2810 times the animal was used, and transport, yarding and competition were all included in the study.

A later PRCA survey of 60,971 animal performances at 198 rodeo performances and 73 sections of "slack" indicated 27 animals were injured, again approximately five-hundredths of 1 percent – 0.044.

Animal rights proponents claim, however, that examples of injuries caused by calf roping include paralysis from spinal cord injuries, severed tracheas, as well as broken backs, necks, and legs. Tie-down calf roping is not permitted in the state of Rhode Island or in the city of Baltimore.

Tie-down calf roping is also not allowed in some localities in Australia, Brazil and Canada and banned nationally in the United Kingdom, Germany and the Netherlands.

A 2016 study indicated that the process of calf roping, including being herded in the arena and into the roping chutes, was stressful on the animals as evidenced by eye movement when roped and increases in blood cortisol, epinephrine and nor-epinephrine. Novice calves just herded into the chutes and across the arena also demonstrated stress responses, experiencing slightly higher stress than experienced ones. However, cortisol responses did not continue for long. The researchers hypothesized that professionals at the highest level were less stressful on the animals than inexperienced ropers.

== See also ==
- Rodeo
