= WRCA (disambiguation) =

WRCA may refer to:

- WRCA, a radio station (AM 1330 kHz) licensed to Watertown, Massachusetts, United States
- WFAN (AM), a radio station (AM 660 kHz) licensed to New York, New York, United States, which held the call sign WRCA from 1954 to 1960
- WNBC, a television station (channel 4 virtual/36 digital) licensed to New York, New York, United States, which held the call sign WRCA-TV from 1954 to 1960
- WQHT, a radio station (FM 97.1 MHz) licensed to New York, New York, United States, which held the call sign WRCA-FM from 1954 to 1960
- White Rock Christian Academy, a school located in South Surrey, British Columbia, Canada
- Working Ranch Cowboys Association, a professional association for ranchers based in Amarillo, Texas, United States
