= Canadian Rockies International Rodeo =

Annual gay rodeo near Calgary, Canada

The Canadian Rockies International Rodeo and Music Festival is Canada's largest gay rodeo. The Alberta Rockies Gay Rodeo Association has been hosting the event near Calgary since 1993. In 1994, the event became the first rodeo held outside of the United States to be sanctioned by the International Gay Rodeo Association (IGRA).

The Canadian Rockies International Rodeo has many of the typical events found at a rodeo, but unlike "straight" rodeos, women compete in all events. Despite the city's social conservatism, Calgary became the first city outside of the United States to host the IGRA's annual convention in 1997.

In 2009, the event moved from Calgary to Strathmore, Alberta. In the early years, the rodeo was not publicised and attendees were asked to not take pictures of the competitors in order to protect their privacy, but it has since become a widely advertised and sponsored event.
