= MSRA =

MSRA may stand for:

- Macrophage scavenger receptor class A, a receptor found in macrophages
- Mid-States Rodeo Association,
- Michigan Shipwreck Research Associates
- Peptide-methionine (S)-S-oxide reductase, an enzyme
- MSRA (gene), a family of enzymes
- Microsoft Research Asia, Microsoft Research's major lab in China
- Microsoft Remote Assistance, a software application in Microsoft Windows
