= North Star Gay Rodeo Association =

The North Star Gay Rodeo Association (NSGRA) is a gay rodeo association in the Midwestern United States (principally Minnesota and Wisconsin) founded to "spread the culture of rodeo", and raise funds for local charitable organizations. It seeks to provide access to the community of gay rodeo organizations in the United States to people of "all gender and sexual identities". It is a nonprofit organization and member of the International Gay Rodeo Association (IGRA).

Founded in 1989, NSGRA had more than 100 members within the first two years, and held its inaugural rodeo during the 1993 Pride week. But after developing a "huge" following in the 1980s and early 1990s, it suffered from debt and dwindling membership as the country craze began to fade by the late 1990s. After having no rodeos for seven years it had a modestly attended rodeo in 2015, and another more successful one in 2016. The August 2016 rodeo at the Dead Broke Arena in Hugo, Minnesota, featured "speed, roping, rough stock and camp events". Profits were donated to the Aliveness Project in Minneapolis.

According to the association website, the 2020 North Star Regional Rodeo was cancelled due to the ongoing COVID-19 pandemic.
