= International Gay Rodeo Association =

Sanctioning body for gay rodeos in the U.S. and Canada

- Sport: Rodeo
- Founded: 1985; 41 years ago
- Countries: United States
- Most recent champion: (United States)
- Website: Igra.com

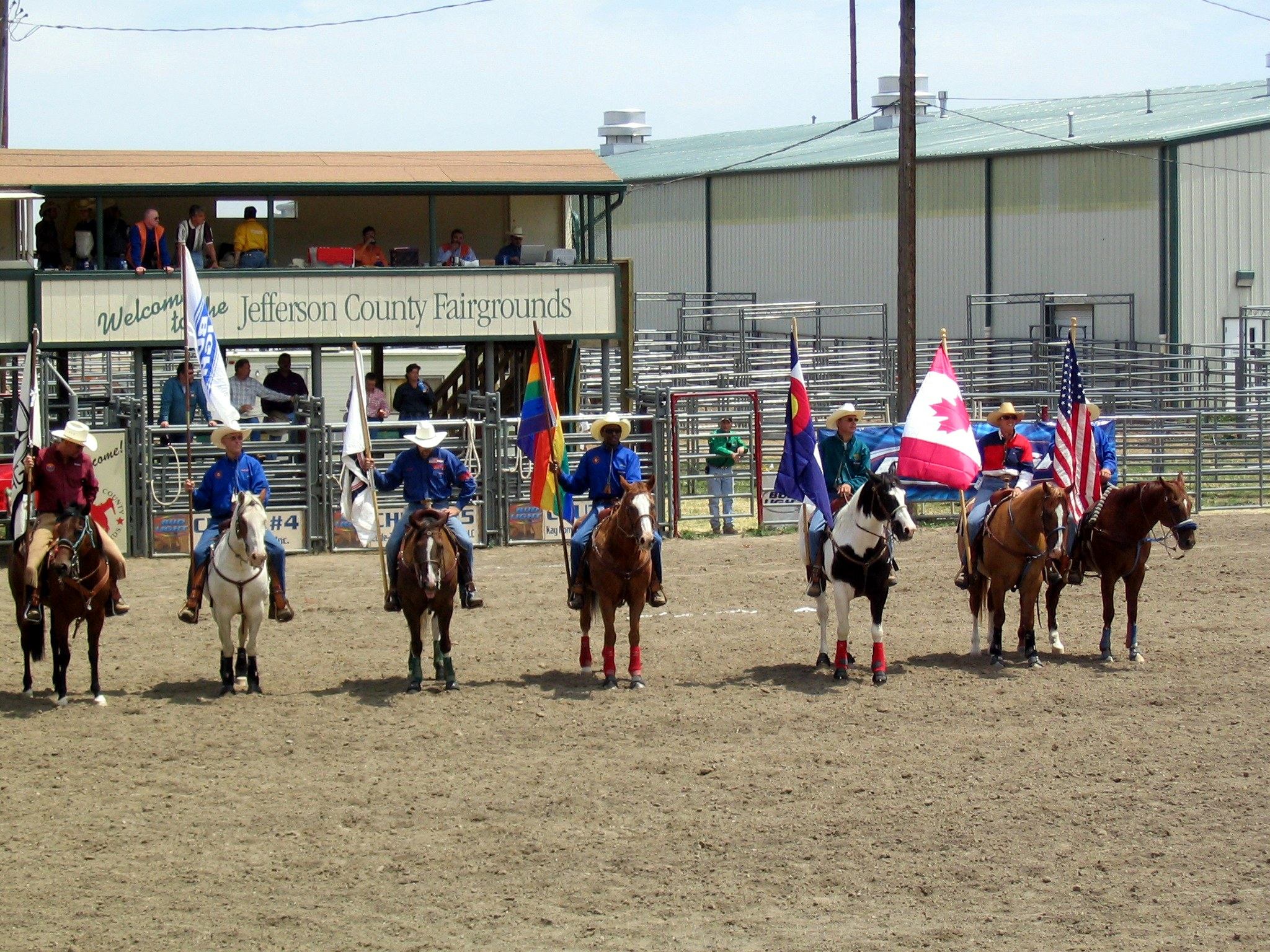
Grand Entry at the Rocky Mountain Regional Rodeo, put on by the Colorado Gay Rodeo Association in 2005

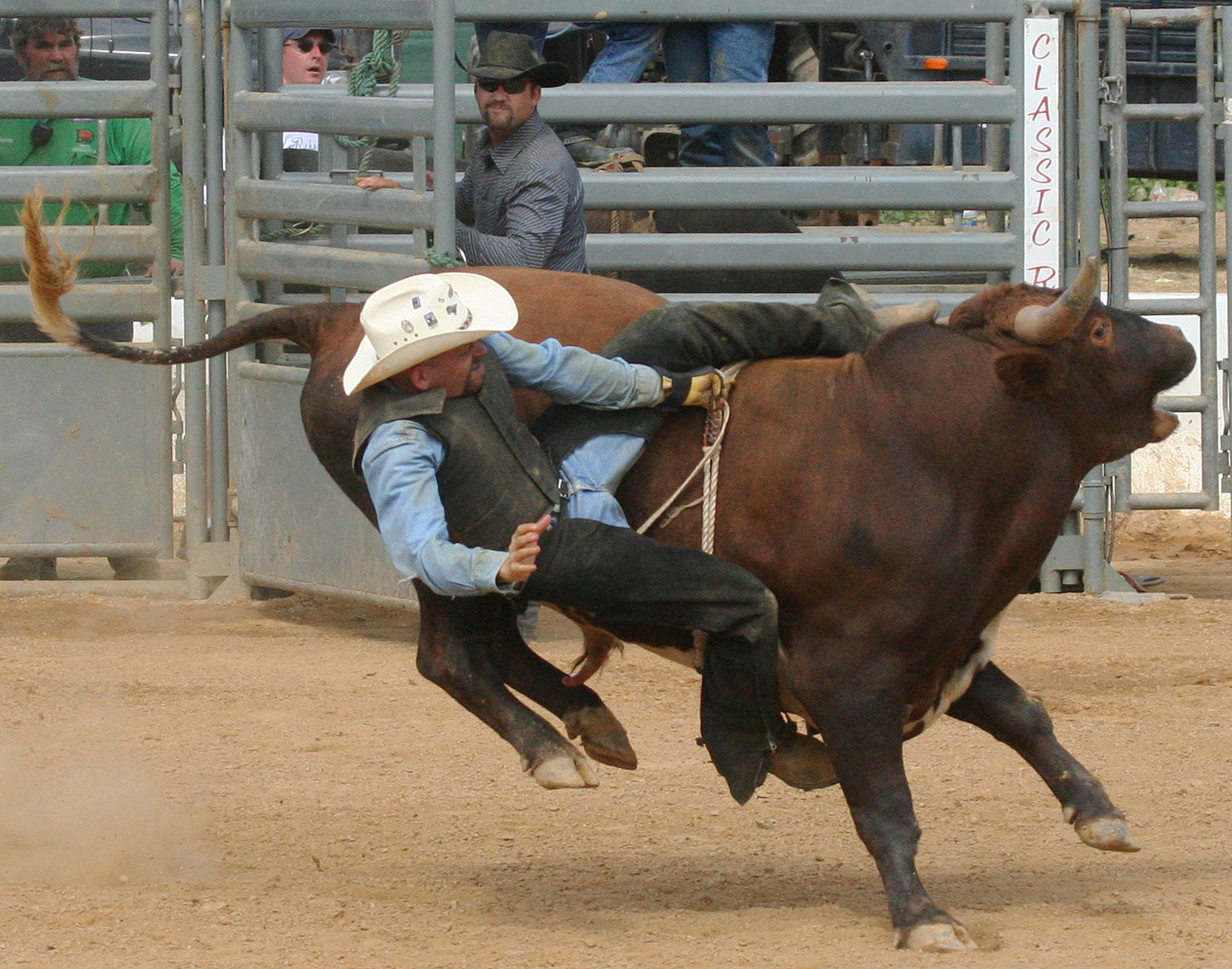
Bull rider at the 2007 Atlantic Stampede, put on by the Atlantic States Gay Rodeo Association

The International Gay Rodeo Association (IGRA), founded in 1985, is the sanctioning body for gay rodeos held throughout the United States and Canada. The first gay rodeo held outside of the United States to be sanctioned by the IGRA was the Canadian Rockies International Rodeo held in Alberta in 1994. They are the largest group coordinating rodeo events specifically welcoming lesbian, gay, bisexual, transgender (LGBT) as well as heterosexual participants and spectators. IGRA is composed of many regional gay rodeo associations, and sanctions a season of rodeo events which culminates in an annual World Gay Rodeo Finals. IGRA events are intended to allow all competitors, regardless of sexual and gender identity, to compete in rodeo sports without discrimination. The organization helps spread appreciation for Western culture and the sport of rodeo, while serving as a fundraising vehicle benefiting many charitable organizations.

Competitors compete for prize money and the title of All Around Cowboy and Cowgirl at each rodeo. The winners of each event receive trophy buckles designed by the hosting association. At season's end, the contestants with the highest points in each event receive invitations to the World Gay Rodeo Finals presented by IGRA. The event was renamed in 2009 from the previous "International Gay Rodeo Finals" moniker it held from its onset in Hayward, California.

The original intent of these rodeos was fundraising, and while highly competitive and structured rodeos still serve the primary purpose of being fundraisers. The money raised at the rodeo is donated to the designated charities of each association. In total IGRA and all the associated associations have donated to furthering the individual causes of all charities that are benefactors of rodeo funds.

In 2010, the IGRA archives dating from 1975 were deposited in the library collection of the Autry National Center in Griffith Park, Los Angeles, which also houses the Museum of the American West.

== History ==
The first gay rodeo was held as a charity fundraising event at the Washoe County Fairgrounds in Reno, Nevada on October 2, 1976. The organizer, Phil Ragsdale, a member of the Imperial Court System, was the Court Emperor of Reno. In time, he came to be regarded as the "Father of Gay Rodeo."

Ragsdale came up with the idea of a holding a rodeo to raise money for the local Thanksgiving Day food drive for senior citizens. Over 125 people took part in the first rodeo, and the winners were crowned King of the Cowboys, Queen of the Cowgirls, and Miss Dusty Spurs (drag queen). The National Reno Gay Rodeo title was officially created in 1977, when he founded the Comstock Gay Rodeo Association. Following the Imperial courts' lead Ragsdale added the "Mr., Ms., and Miss National Reno Gay Rodeo" titles to aid in the fund raising that was to benefit the Muscular Dystrophy Association. These titles still exist today but have been recognized as Mr., Ms., Miss, MsTer, and Mx. International Gay Rodeo Association since the IGRA replaced the old National Reno format.

By 1984, the ninth and final National Reno Gay Rodeo brought out over 10,000 people to the rodeo grounds. The demise of the National Reno Rodeos is credited by the IRS as a dispute between the Gay Rodeo, the Washoe County Fairgrounds and the Sands Hotel. The rodeo's books were alleged to have been seized by the IRS.

History has recorded 14 gay rodeos (9 in Reno, 3 in Colorado, 1 in Texas, and 1 in California) prior to the formation of the International Gay Rodeo Association (IGRA). The IGRA became truly international in 1993 when the Canada-based Alberta Rockies Gay Rodeo Association joined.

In September 1985 with 10 years of rodeo history behind it, gay rodeo associations from Colorado, Texas, California, and Arizona gathered in Denver, Colorado to form an organization to standardize the rules of Gay Rodeo. As a result, the International Gay Rodeo Association was created with Colorado, Texas, California, and Arizona as founding member associations. These four associations seated the Oklahoma Gay Rodeo Association at its first convention held in the same year. The newly formed association elected Wayne Jakino from Colorado as its first President.

In 1987, IGRA's first International Finals Rodeo was held in Hayward, California. The name was changed to the World Gay Rodeo Finals in 2009.

The 2014 documentary film Queens & Cowboys follows the story of cowboy Wade Earp and others who compete in the IGRA. Earp discusses how he does not compete in rodeos outside IGRA because, "There's still a lot of homophobia. As progressive as we think the world's gotten, there's so much we have to conquer." On November 9, 2014, CNN aired an episode of This Is Life with Lisa Ling that covered the Zia Regional Rodeo in Santa Fe, New Mexico, including profiles of several cowboys and cowgirls that are active on the IGRA circuit.

=== Conventions, presidents, and royalty ===
A list of presidents, royalty, conventions, and finals since IGRA was founded in 1985:

Year / Rodeos Held	Convention	President	Mr. IGRA	Ms. IGRA	Miss IGRA (drag queen)	MsTer IGRA (drag king)	Mx IGRA (non-binary, gender non-conforming, gender queer)	Finals Rodeo	Grand Marshals
1985	Denver	Wayne Jakino, CGRA	--	--	--	--		--	
1986 / 5	Denver	Wayne Jakino	Gary Oliver, CGRA	Jeannie Nelson, CGRA	Fritz Capone (Jim Freeman), OGRA	--		--	--
1987 / 6	Albuquerque	Les Krambeal, OGRA	Tony Lazano, TGRA	Dee Godwin, OGRA	Misty Michaels (Steve Rogers), KGRA	--		Hayward, CA	Shanti Project
1988 / 7	Fort Worth	Les Krambeal	--	--	--	--		Reno, NV (see note below)	Lynn Copeland & Wayne Jakino
1989 / 7	Albuquerque	Gerald Ford, TGRA	Jerry Hubbard, GSGRA	Connie Clovis, KGRA	Magnolia Spirits (Buddy Sojourner), CGRA	--		Phoenix, AZ	Ed Buck
1990 / 7	Wichita	Linn Copeland, KGRA	Larry Brumley, OGRA	Laura O'Neill, CGRA	Moosala (Mark Church), AGRA	--		Phoenix, AZ	Katie Southwick
1991 / 10	Albuquerque	Bob Pimentel, NMGRA	Scott Burleson, MGRA	Linda Sullo, GSGRA	Hollie Woods (David Anaya), AGRA	--		Wichita, KS	The Names Project
1992 / 13	St. Paul	Bob Pimentel	Jim Carter, OGRA	RC Cuellar, CGRA	Roxie Heart (John Kingston), KGRA	--		Phoenix, AZ	Wayne Jakino
1993 / 16	Billings	Roger Bergmann, GSGRA	Ron Neff, CGRA	Dee Zuspann, KGRA	Chili Pepper (Tony Valdez), TGRA	--		Fort Worth, TX	Gerald Ford
1994 / 21	Little Rock	Roger Bergmann	J.R. Duran, NMGRA	Joanne Bawiec, ASGRA	Miss Tessie (Tim Smith), SEGRA	--		Denver, CO	Greg Olson
1995 / 22	Chicago	Roger Bergmann	Mark Burdine, NMGRA	Desiree Gronwald, CGRA	DeShannon (Mitch Gill), TGRA	--		Denver, CO	Roger Bergmann
1996 / 20	Omaha	Tom Vance, NSGRA	Michael Vrooman, CGRA	Shugar Vigil, NMGRA	Naomi La'Rell (Quentin Sims), CGRA	--		Albuquerque, NM	Connie Lee
1997 / 18	Salt Lake City	Tom Vance	Tommy Channel, CGRA	Sherry Reedy, AGRA	Tori Hart (Rohn Roldan), CGRA	--		Phoenix, AZ	Tom Vance
1998 / 20	Baltimore	Linda Frazier, KGRA	Kurt McGregor, AGRA	Tamara Marks, MIGRA	Beverly DeMarco (Anthony D.), NMGRA	--		Phoenix, AZ	Glenn Gore
1999 / 19	Long Beach	Linda Frazier	Douglas Graff, GSGRA	Laura Scott, NGRA	DeShannon (Mitch Gill), NGRA	--		Little Rock, AR	Ron Trusley
2000 / 17	Las Vegas	Craig Allen Rouse, GSGRA	Daniel Lusk, ASGRA	Lonni LaBel, ASGRA	Harley Quinn (Michael Vrooman), ILGRA	--		Albuquerque, NM	Thom Sloan
2001 / 17	Long Beach	Craig Allen Rouse	Michael Cunningham, ILGRA	Erin Leavey, SEGRA	Victoria London (Scott Tickler), AGRA	--		Palm Springs, CA	Jose Sarria, aka "The Widow Norton"
2002 / 19	Cleveland	Craig Allen Rouse	Mark Larson, NSGRA	Lize MacDonald, NGRA	Bianca St John (Kenny Cunitz), CGRA	--		Wichita, KS	Fritz Capone
2003 / 19	Phoenix	Craig Allen Rouse	David Westman, CGRA	Mary Munger, CGRA	Jada McRae (Jay Carlson), ILGRA	--		Tulsa, OK	Patrick Terry
2004 / 20	Denver	Craig Allen Rouse	Eric Hanson, GSGRA	Julie Brown, DSRA	Mandy Barbarell (Andrew Goodman), MGRA	--		Omaha, NE	Tamara Marks
2005 / 20	Calgary	Brian Helander, AGRA	Ken Pool, CGRA	Gaylia Young, AGRA	Pussy LeHoot (Kevin McSweeny), AGRA	--		Dallas, TX	James Ramey
2006 / 20	Nashville	Brian Helander	Steve Wollert, GSGRA	Kimberley Kay, CGRA	Jymmye Jaymes (James Young), ASGRA	--		Reno, NV	Keith Ann, Mitch Gill
2007 / 18	Kansas City	Brian Helander	Clyde Mitter, CGRA	--	Destiny B. Childs (Ric Legg), ASGRA	--		Denver, CO	Wayne Jakino
2008 / 20	New Orleans	Brian Helander	Gary Rushton, AGRA	--	Janet Jenkins, CGRA	--		Denver, CO	John King
2009 / 16	Toronto	Brian Helander	Wade Earp, TGRA	Sharon Starks, AGRA	Aspen Vail, (Steve Sublett) CGRA	Rocket Coxx, (Jamie Light) CGRA		Albuquerque, NM	Lorrie Murphy
2010 / 17	Reno	Brian Helander	Roger Courtemanche, CGRA	--	Ionna Doublewide, AGRA	--		Laughlin, NV	Lorry King
2011 / 15	San Diego	Doug Graff, NGRA	Michael Butts, AGRA	Sharon Starks, AGRA	Kimberli Foxx, NGRA	--		Fort Worth, TX	David Hill
2012 / 15	Las Vegas	Doug Graff, NGRA	Rodd Smunk, TGRA	Kami Boles, MGRA	Victoria Weston, TGRA	Shane Lee, MGRA		Fort Worth, TX	Frank Harrell/Ty Teigen
2013 / 14	San Diego	Ed Barry, ILGRA	Frank Thompson, OGRA	--	Sabel D'Zyre, NGRA	--		Fort Worth, TX	Mitch Gill
2014 / 13	Denver	Ed Barry, ILGRA	Jeff Germany, OGRA	Pauline Chavez, CGRA	Katrina Davenport, NGRA	Rocki Heffa, TGRA		Fort Worth, TX	Janie Van Santen
2015 / 11	St Petersburg	Bruce Gros	Andrew Johnson, CGRA	--	Luxx Bentley, OGRA	Preston, NGRA		Las Vegas, NV	Brian Rogers
2016 / 10	Austin	Bruce Gros	Thomas McCarthy, FGRA	Mary Honeycutt, TGRA	Madison Devereux, TGRA	Macc Country, OGRA		Las Vegas, NV	Ed Berry
2017 / 11	Little Rock	Bruce Gros	Mark Christensen, OGRA	Allyson Paige Henery, GPRA	Kelly ONeil, TGRA	-		Albuquerque, NM	TBD
2018 / 11	Salt Lake City	Candy Pratt	Tre' Brewbaker, NMGRA 1st RU- Chris Tobin CGRA 2nd RU- Tony Schwartz NSGRA	Tamra Kelly, TGRA, 1st RU Christi Mikels	Mipsy Mikels, AGRA 1st RU- Marie Antoinette DuBarryNMGRA 2nd RU- Phat Patty NGRA	RJ Mikels, AGRA		Scottsdale, AZ	Anthony Valdez
2019 / 10	Denver	Candy Pratt	Travis James, AGRA	Alina Whorez, TGRA 1st RU - Jen Vrana, KSGRA 2nd RU - Delyria Paul Twilight Starr, NMGRA	Priscilla Toya Bouvier, NMGRA 1st RU - Duchess Zwiers, KSGRA 2nd RU - Ionna Doublwide, AGRA	Jorge Sanchez, NSGRA		Scottsdale, AZ	John Beck
2020 / 1	Cancelled	Candy Pratt	Chicken Nugget, TGRA 1st RU - Mahlon Lovell, AGRA 2nd RU - Russel Waisanen, NSGRA	Nicole Reighlie Whorez, MGRA	Nikki Starr, AGRA 1st RU - Bootsy CarMichael, NGRA 2nd RU - Alexis Cole, TGRA	Kade Jackwell, MGRA 1st RU - Jesse N Cider Morecoxx, TGRA			
2021 / 3		Candy Pratt	Chicken Nugget, TGRA 1st RU - Mahlon Lovell, AGRA 2nd RU - Russel Waisanen, NSGRA	Nicole Reighlie Whorez, MGRA	Nikki Starr, AGRA 1st RU - Bootsy CarMichael, NGRA 2nd RU - Alexis Cole, TGRA	Kade Jackwell, MGRA 1st RU - Jesse N Cider Morecoxx, TGRA			
2022 / 12	Denton	Candy Pratt	Ryan Knop, AGRA 1st RU - Cameron Ticey, NMGRA 2nd RU - Danny Love Perez, CGRA	Jade Fauver, NSGRA 1st RU - Shannon McKenzie, AGRA	Charis Loren, CGRA 1st RU - Celeste Powers, AGRA	Dakota Aire Paris, UGRA		El Reno, OK	
2023 / 11	Reno	Brian Helander	Weston Crow-Tucker, CGRA		Selena Whorez, TGRA 1st RU - Madame Fellatia Monroe, AGRA 2nd RU - Tessie Taylor, GPRA	Rocket Coxx, CGRA		El Reno, OK	
2024 /	Grand Rapids	Brian Helander	Chris Aguilar, NGRA 1st RU - Andy Siekkinen, GSGRA 2nd RU - Sebastian Black Starr, AGRA	Christina Miner, CGRA 1st RU - Janelle King-Neptune, GPRA 2nd RU - Luna Starr Black, AGRA	Aurora Gayheart, NMGRA 1st RU - Southyrn St. John Comfort, GPRA 2nd RU - Miranda Rites Ticey, AGRA	Ryder Gently, AGRA		El Reno, OK	
2025 /	Denver	Brian Helander	Brandon Bayes, NMGRA 1st RU - Jay R Gayheart, ASGRA 2nd RU - Kirk Wylie, TGRA	Kami Boles, GPRA 1st RU - Jenn Vrana, ASGRA 2nd RU - Kim Mann, TGRA	Tequila Mockingbird, NGRA 1st RU - Seliah DeLeon, NMGRA 2nd RU - Celebrity Starr, AGRA	Kaven O'Neil, TGRA	Tink, AGRA 1st RU - Pup Mystic, UGRA	Reno, NV	TBD
2026 /	TBD	Brian Helander	TBD	TBD	TBD	TBD	TBD	El Reno, OK	TBD

- Note: In 1988, "A contract with a private ranch sixty miles east of Reno was made void when the local homophobic District Attorney filed an injunction two days before the rodeo in order to stop the event. Two days in court as well as a trip to the Nevada Supreme Court failed to overturn the injunction," according to the IGRA website. As a result, no finals were held that year.

=== Royalty team ===
Like all traditional rodeos, IGRA rodeos also sponsor an annual royalty competition to determine the individuals who will comprise the IGRA Royalty Team. To qualify, contestants need to be the current titleholders or first runners-up of a Member Association. The five categories of royalty are Mr. (male that presents as male), Ms. (female that presents as female), Miss (male that presents as female), MsTer (female that presents as male), and Mx. (non-binary, non-gender conforming, or gender queer). Each category can award a Black Sash (title winner), Red Sash (1st runner-up), and White Sash (2nd runner-up) to be included in the team.

The MsTer title was created at the 2005 IGRA Convention but was not awarded until 2009. The Mx. title was created at the 2023 IGRA Convention and awarded the first Mx. IGRA in 2024, the first year the title was available.

A change to royalty competition rules in 2015 requires a contestant to compete in four of five categories. The five areas of competition are:

- Personal Interview - Mandatory
- Western wear modeling - Mandatory
- Public Presentation and On-Stage Question - Mandatory
- Horsemanship Skill - Required if not competing in Entertainment
- Public Entertainment - Required if not competing in Horsemanship

== Criticism ==
Animal rights organizations such as Mercy for Animals, Showing Animals Respect & Kindness (SHARK), People for the Ethical Treatment of Animals (PETA) and LGBT Compassion criticize Gay Rodeo for perceived cruelty to animals. In response to increased publicity given to critics of Gay Rodeo, IGRA published a press release stating that their animals are well-treated and handled in accordance with established ethical guidelines.

== State and regional rodeo associations ==
=== Current associations ===
Rodeos under the IGRA umbrella previously were organized into four divisions (see map here) with more than two dozen regional associations. The following are current Member Associations of IGRA:

- AGRA - Arizona Gay Rodeo Association, Phoenix, founded 1984
  - includes the state of Arizona except for the southeastern counties covered by SGRA (see below)
- ASGRA - Atlantic States Gay Rodeo Association, Alexandria, Virginia, founded 1991
  - includes Washington DC, Maryland, Virginia, Delaware, New Jersey and metropolitan New York City
- CGRA - Colorado Gay Rodeo Association, Denver, founded 1981
- CRGRA - Canadian Rockies Gay Rodeo Association, Alberta, seated in 2018
- DSRA - Diamond State Rodeo Association, Little Rock, Arkansas
- GSGRA - Golden State Gay Rodeo Association, Long Beach, California, founded 1984
  - Bay Area Chapter, San Francisco
  - Greater Palm Springs Chapter, founded 2000
  - San Diego Chapter, founded 2025
  - Greater San Diego Chapter, founded 1986, dissolved 2016
  - Los Angeles Chapter, original chapter dissolved 2007
  - Sacramento Chapter - split off to form SCCGRA (see below)
- ILGRA - Illinois Gay Rodeo Association, Chicago
- MIGRA - Michigan International Gay Rodeo Association, Dearborn, founded 1994
- MGRA - Missouri Gay Rodeo Association, Kansas City, Missouri, founded 1986
  - includes the state of Missouri other than those counties covered by GWGRA (see above)
- NGRA - Nevada Gay Rodeo Association, Las Vegas, founded 1992
- NMGRA - New Mexico Gay Rodeo Association, Albuquerque, New Mexico, founded 1984
- NSGRA - North Star Gay Rodeo Association, St. Paul, founded 1989
  - includes Minnesota and Wisconsin
- GPRA - Great Plains Rodeo Association (changed name from OGRA - Oklahoma Gay Rodeo Association in 2016), Oklahoma City, founded 1985
- RRRA - Red River Rodeo Association, Aubrey, Texas, founded 2003
  - includes several counties north of the Dallas-Fort Worth Metroplex
- TGRA - Texas Gay Rodeo Association, Fort Worth, founded 1984
  - Austin Chapter
  - Dallas Chapter
  - Fort Worth Chapter
  - Houston Chapter
  - San Antonio Chapter
    - includes the state of Texas except for several north-central counties covered by RRRA (see above)
- UGRA - Utah Gay Rodeo Association, seated at 1989 IGRA Convention; dissolved 2006, formed again and seated at the 2022 IGRA Convention

=== Defunct associations ===
The following rodeo associations were once affiliated with IGRA but became inactive, and dissolved or reorganized:

- Pacific Coast Gay Rodeo Association (California), loosely organized in 1980; replaced by Golden State Gay Rodeo Association in 1984
- Heartland Gay Rodeo Association (Nebraska and Iowa), seated at 1993 IGRA convention
- Cowboy State Rodeo Association (Wyoming), founded 1988, name changed the following year to Big Sky Gay Rodeo Association (Montana); dissolved 1998
- Oregon Gay Rodeo Association, seated at 1988 IGRA convention; replaced by Northwest Gay Rodeo Association in 1990
- Northwest Gay Rodeo Association (Washington, Oregon, and Idaho), seated at 1990 IGRA convention; reorganized as Pacific Northwest Gay Rodeo Association
- Tri-State Gay Rodeo Association (Ohio, Indiana, and Kentucky), founded 1990, dissolved 1995
- Silver State Gay Rodeo Association (Nevada); reorganized as Nevada Gay Rodeo Association, 1992
- Pennsylvania Gay Rodeo Association seated at 1995 IGRA convention; name and coverage changed to PONY (Pennsylvania, Ohio, New York Gay Rodeo Association) in 1999; dissolved 2007
- FGRA - Florida Georgia Rodeo Association (Formerly Florida Gay Rodeo Association), St. Petersburg, dissolved 2017
- SRRA - Suwannee River Rodeo Association, Florida, seated at 2017 IGRA Convention, dissolved 2019
- ARGRA - Alberta Rockies Gay Rodeo Association, Calgary, founded 1991, dissolved 2016
- CSGRA - Cotton States Gay Rodeo Association, Birmingham, founded 2012
- SGRA - Sonoran Gay Rodeo Association, Tucson, Arizona
- SCCGRA - Sacramento's Capital Crossroads Gay Rodeo Association, Sacramento, California, dissolved 2019
- KSGRA - Keystone State Gay Rodeo Association, Harrisburg, founded 2015, did not renew 2019
- LSGRA - Louisiana State Gay Rodeo Association, Bossier City, Pennsylvania, withdrew membership 2016.

== Competitions ==
=== Rules ===
Most associations host at least one annual rodeo. All associations must follow the rules of conduct as outlined in the IGRA Rodeo Rule Book, the first edition of which was published in 1985. These rules are often updated and ratified at season's end when delegates from each association gather at the IGRA annual convention. The purpose of the convention is to elect new officers, create new rules and bylaws, and seat new associations.

Each of the thirteen events has a set of rules that must be followed in order for contestants to score points and to qualify for the year end finals. Unlike in traditional rodeos, contestants are allowed to compete in all events regardless of sex. Buckles are awarded to the top male and female competitors in each event, as well as buckles for Rookie of the Year and for All-Around Cowboy and All-Around Cowgirl.

=== Rough stock events ===
1. Bull riding
2. Steer riding
3. Chute dogging or steer wrestling
4. Bareback bronc riding (this is an optional event)

=== Roping events ===
1. Calf roping on foot
2. Mounted Breakaway roping
3. Team roping

=== Speed events ===
1. Barrel racing
2. Pole bending
3. Flag racing

=== Camp events ===
1. Wild drag race
2. Goat dressing
3. Steer decorating
