= Wild cow milking =

Rodeo team event

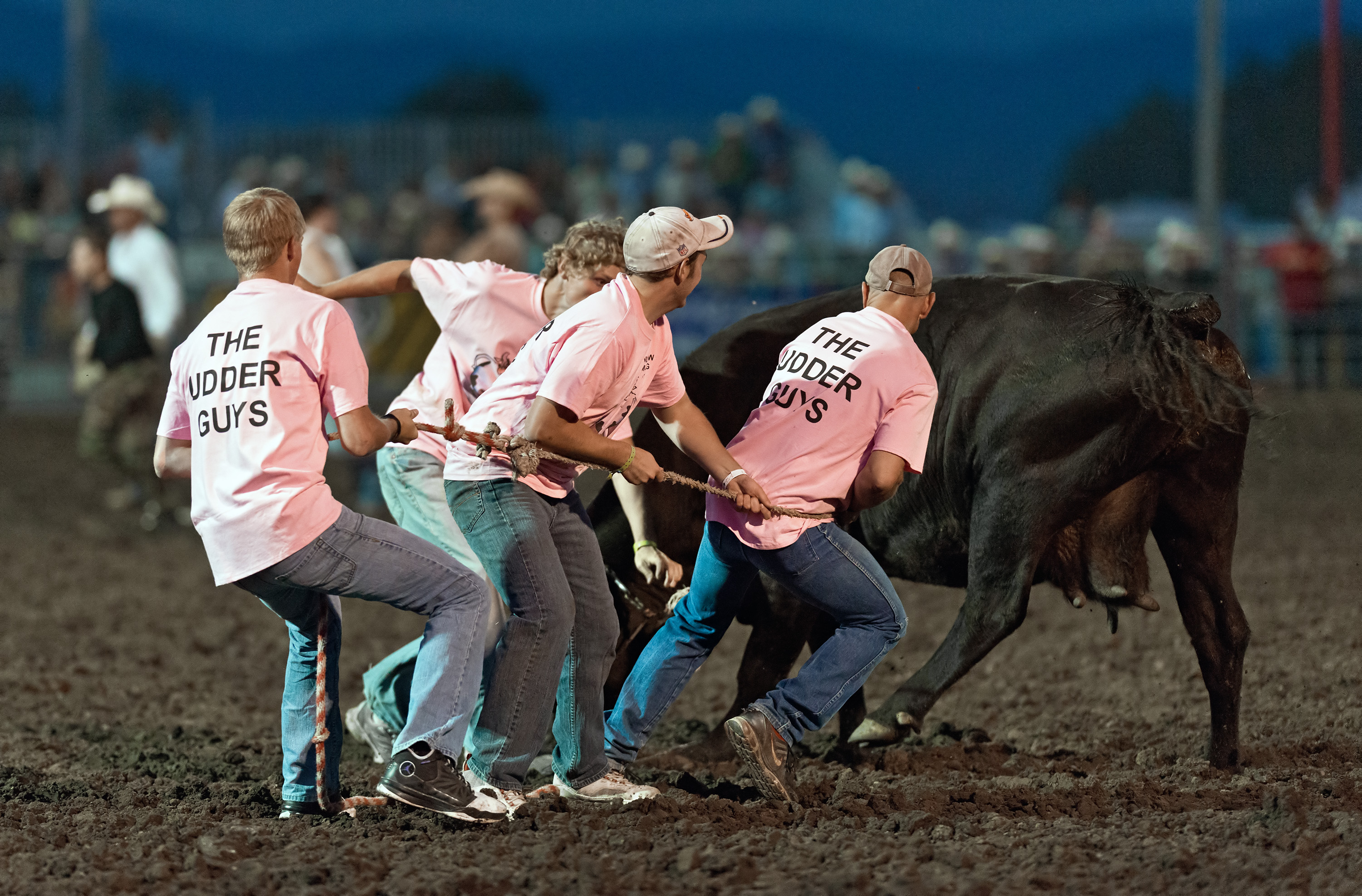
A wild cow milking team

Wild cow milking is a rodeo event seen at mainstream and ranch rodeos. A team-based competition, the goal is to catch and milk a "wild" cow (a semi-feral animal that is not used to being milked by people, usually of a beef cattle breed) in as short a time as possible. The competition dates back at least to the early 20th century, with competitions at the Cheyenne Frontier Days rodeo photographed as far back as 1924.

== Rules ==
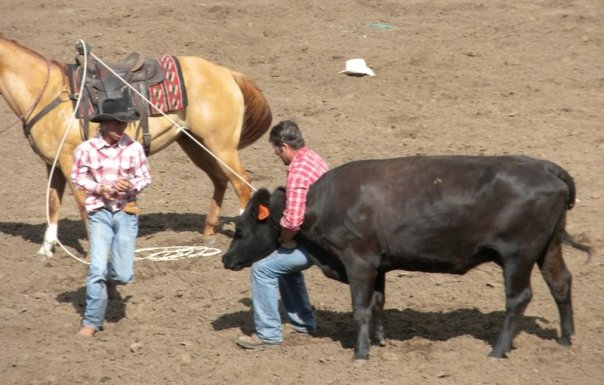
Some competitions include horse mounted riders

Though the specifics can vary depending on the rodeo, the general rules for wild cow milking are:

- Each team commonly consists of two, three, or more individuals. Ranch rodeo teams usually have four members.
- Competitions may include cowboys on horses. If so, one or two team members are on horseback; the others are on foot. Other events have all team members afoot.
- One individual (occasionally two), called the "mugger," is tasked with holding the animal's head. Another, the "milker," generally the fastest person on the team, attempts to milk the cow. Some teams have an "anchor man," whose primary duty is to hold onto the rope that restrains the cow.
- Some competitions place the cows in the bucking chutes and all teams compete at once. Each cow is already wearing a halter with a long lead rope, or a lasso around its neck. A team member, usually the anchor man, is given the rope of their cow prior to the opening of the chutes.
- Other competitions require the contestants to rope their cow.
- Ranch rodeo competitions generally have only one or two teams compete at a time, and the timer starts when the cow crosses the steer roping line. Team members cannot cross the start line before the cow does without incurring a time penalty. A cowboy on horseback will try to rope the cow. If they miss once, the roper can try again; but there is a two-loop limit for roping attempts.
- Once the cow is roped, the team members on foot will try to hold the cow still so it can be milked. The rope must be taken off the saddle horn before milking starts. Usually, the roper must also dismount, and is often the person who starts milking the cow.
- The cow is milked into a bottle; usually an empty soda bottle.
- One of the team members runs (on foot) with the bottle to the judge. The timer stops when they cross the line to reach the judge.
- The judge will verify that the task has been completed by pouring the milk out of the bottle. If no milk comes out of the bottle, the team is disqualified.
- There is a time limit, usually of two minutes; if the task is not completed within the time limit, the team is disqualified.
- The fastest time wins.

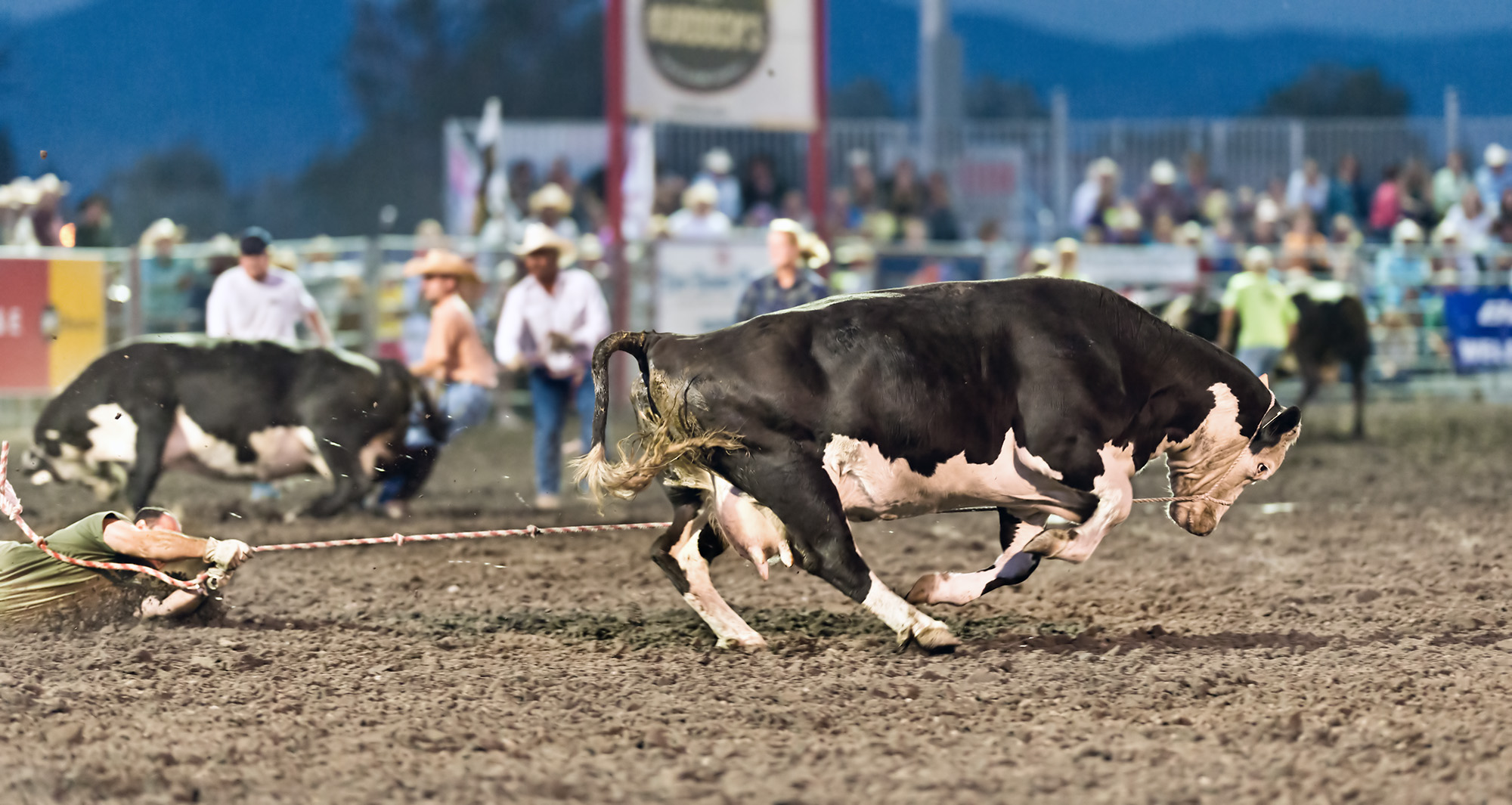
Wild cow milking can be hazardous

The sport is known for being unpredictable, and for being both entertaining (to the spectators) and dangerous (for the participants), with participants often getting trampled by the cow or tripped up by the rope.
