= Ranch rodeo =

Traditional type of rodeo

A ranch rodeo is a traditional type of rodeo in which teams of cowboys or cowgirls from different ranches compete against each other in events based on the type of work they do every day.

Ranch rodeos differ from the more common PRCA-style rodeos in several ways. For starters, the contestants are not professional rodeo cowboys; instead, they are usually full-time ranch hands who compete in annual ranch rodeos for fun and for bragging rights. The events in ranch rodeos are more similar to the tasks commonly performed on a ranch, and the equipment and tack used are the same as those used during everyday ranch work. Instead of competing as individuals, the contestants in ranch rodeos compete as a team representing the ranch they work for. Though there are often individual awards such as "Top Hand" and "Top Horse," the main prize is for the top overall ranch team.

Sanctioning bodies include the Working Ranch Cowboys Association, which sponsors the World Championship Ranch Rodeo in Amarillo, Texas; and the Western States Ranch Rodeo Association, which sponsors the WSRRA National Finals in Winnemucca, Nevada.

== Competitive events ==
Most ranch rodeos consist entirely of timed events, with the goal being to complete the assigned task in the shortest possible time. Common ranch rodeo events include:

- Calf branding - Teams have to find and rope specific calves (identified by a number they are randomly assigned) out of a larger herd of cattle, bring the calves to the branding area, and "brand" them by marking the calves with chalk.
- Steer doctoring (or ranch vet) - Similar to calf branding, except the cattle are older and larger, and the event simulates bringing a sick animal in from the herd for veterinary care.
- Team penning - Teams of three riders must sort out a few specific cattle (each identified by a specific number marking) from a larger herd, and move those cattle into a small pen at the other end of the arena.
- Wild horse race - Teams must saddle a wild horse and ride it across the finish line at the far end of the arena.
- Wild cow milking - Teams rope a wild cow and hand-milk it into an empty soda bottle. One team member then runs the bottle across the finish line on foot, and pours out a small amount of milk for the judges to prove they accomplished the task.
