= Mid-States Rodeo Association =

- Sport: Rodeo
- Countries: United States
- Most recent champion(s): (United States)
- Official website: MidStatesRodeo.com

The Mid-States Rodeo Association (MSRA) is an American semi-professional rodeo association that sanctions events in Michigan, Illinois, Indiana, Ohio, Pennsylvania, West Virginia and Kentucky. The MSRA is headquartered in Riga, Michigan. It is not to be confused with the identically named Mid-States Rodeo Association which sanctions events in Minnesota, Iowa, South Dakota, Nebraska and Kansas.

== MSRA Events ==
- Calf roping
- Barrel racing
- Breakaway roping
- Saddle bronc riding
- Bareback bronc riding
- Bull riding
- Steer wrestling
- Team roping
