= Rodeo =

Competitive sport

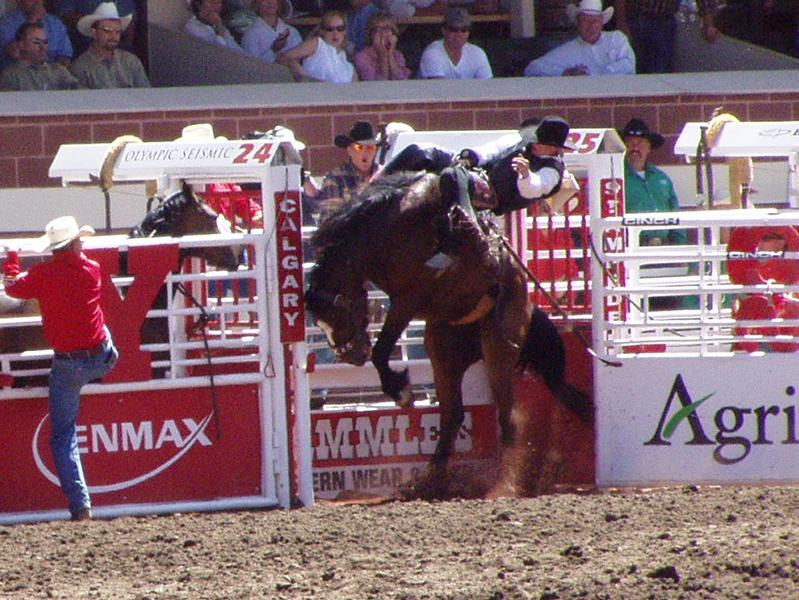
- Bucking horse at the Calgary Stampede in 2002
- Highest governing body: Professional Rodeo Cowboys Association
- First played: 1869

Characteristics
- Team members: No
- Mixed-sex: Yes
- Type: Indoor or Outdoor

Rodeo (/ˈroʊdioʊ/ ROH-dee-oh or /rəˈdeɪoʊ/ rə-DAY-oh) is a competitive equestrian sport that arose out of the working practices of cattle herding in Spain and Mexico, expanding throughout the Americas and to other nations. It was originally based on the skills required of the working vaqueros and, later, cowboys in what today is the western United States, western Canada, and northern Mexico. Today, it is a sporting event that involves horses and other livestock, designed to test the skill and speed of the cowboys and cowgirls. Professional rodeos generally comprise the following events: tie-down roping, team roping, steer wrestling, saddle bronc riding, bareback bronc riding, bull riding, breakaway roping, and barrel racing. The events are divided into two basic categories: the timed events and rough stock events. Depending on sanctioning organization and region, other events such as goat tying and pole bending may also be a part of some rodeos. The "world's first public cowboy contest" was held on July 4, 1883, in Pecos, Texas, between cattle driver Trav Windham and roper Morg Livingston.

Rodeo, particularly popular today throughout the western United States, western Canada, Mexico's northern-border states, and southeastern Brazil, is the official state sport of Wyoming, Montana, South Dakota, and Texas. The iconic silhouette image of a "Bucking Horse and Rider" is a federal and state-registered trademark of Wyoming. The Legislative Assembly of Alberta has considered making rodeo the official sport of that province. However, enabling legislation has yet to be passed. Rodeo has been granted cultural heritage status in Baja California and Coahuila. Chihuahua is considered the epicenter of the sport in Mexico and some legislative attempts have been made to give it cultural heritage status in said state, but none have prevailed yet. Rodeo has been federally recognized as an integral part of Brazilian cultural heritage.

In the United States, professional rodeos are governed and sanctioned by the Professional Rodeo Cowboys Association (PRCA) and Women's Professional Rodeo Association (WPRA), while other associations govern assorted children's, high school, collegiate, and other amateur or semi-professional rodeos. Associations also exist for Native Americans and other minority groups. The traditional season for competitive rodeo runs from spring through fall, while the modern professional rodeo circuit runs longer, and concludes with the PRCA National Finals Rodeo (NFR) in Las Vegas, held every December.

Rodeo has provoked opposition from animal rights and some animal welfare advocates, who argue that various competitions constitute animal cruelty. The rodeo industry has made progress in improving the welfare of rodeo animals, with specific requirements for veterinary care and other regulations that protect rodeo animals. However, some local and state governments in North America have banned or restricted rodeos, certain rodeo events, or types of equipment. Internationally, rodeo is banned in the United Kingdom and the Netherlands, with other European nations placing restrictions on certain practices.

== Etymology ==
The American English word rodeo is taken directly from Spanish rodeo ([roˈðe.o]), which roughly translates into English as 'round up'. The Spanish word is derived from the verb rodear, meaning 'to surround' or 'go around'. In Spain it used to refer to "a pen for cattle at a fair or market," derived from the Latin rota or rotare, meaning 'to rotate or go around'.

In Spanish America, the rodeo was the process that was used by vaqueros to gather cattle for various purposes, such as moving them to new pastures, separating the cattle owned by different ranchers, or gathering in preparation for slaughter (matanza). The yearly rodeos for separating the cattle were overseen by the Juez del Campo, who decided all questions of ownership. The term was also used to refer to exhibitions of skills used in the working rodeo and it evolved from these yearly gatherings where festivities were held, and horsemen could demonstrate their equestrian skills. This latter usage was adopted into the cowboy tradition of the United States and Canada.

The term rodeo was first used in English in approximately 1834 to refer to a cattle round-up. Today, the word is used primarily to refer to a public exhibition of cowboy skills, usually in the form of a competitive event.

== History ==
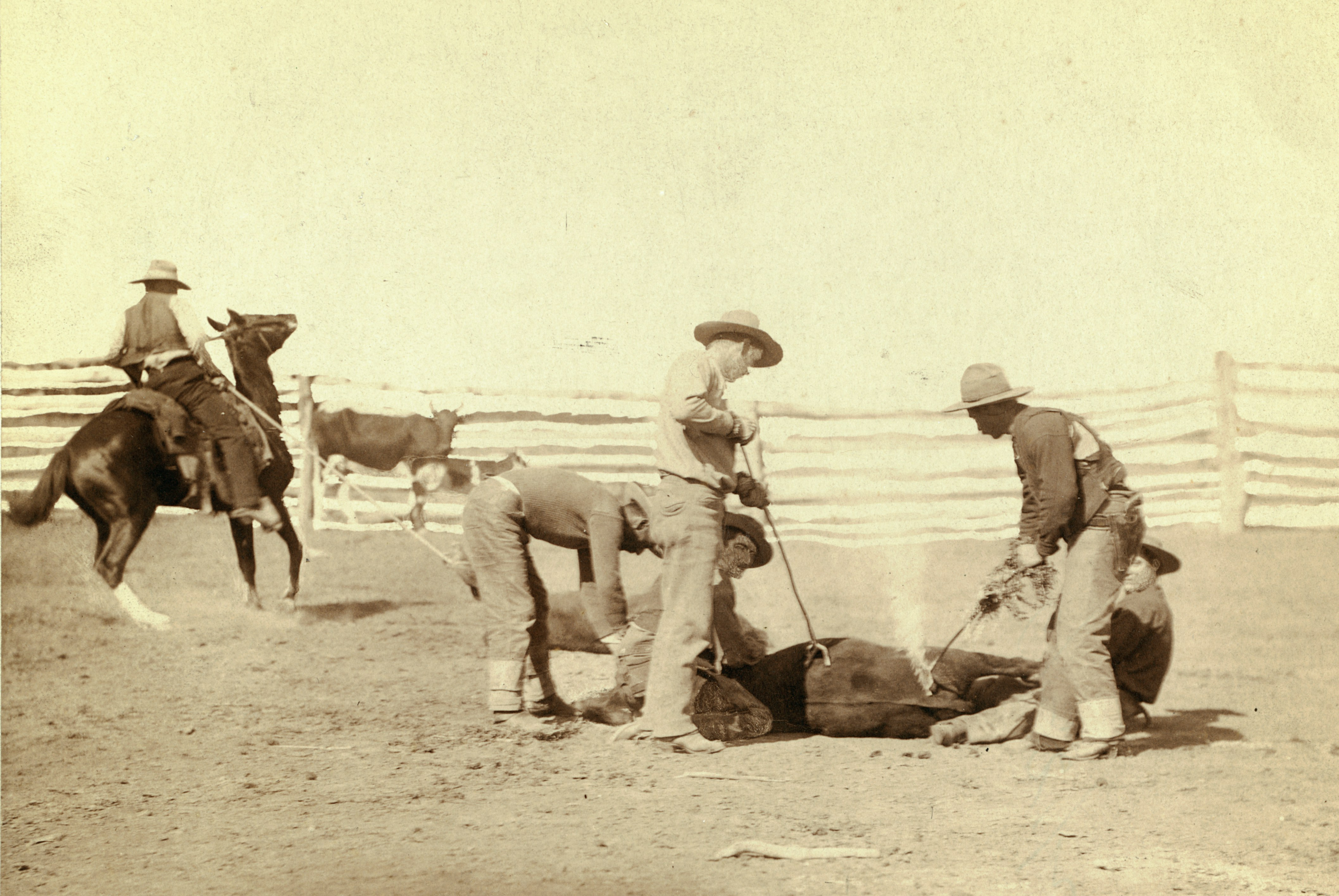
Branding calves, 1888

Exhibition riding in Buffalo Bill's Wild West Show

Many rodeo events were based on the tasks required by cattle ranching. The working cowboy developed skills to fit the needs of the terrain and climate of the American west, and there were many regional variations. Some of the skills required to manage cattle and horses date back to the 16th-century rodeo traditions of the Vaqueros in the lands of the Viceroyalty of New Spain, present day Mexico and the American Southwest.

Early rodeo-like affairs of the 1820s and 1830s were informal events in the western United States and northern Mexico with cowboys and vaqueros testing their work skills against one another. After the American Civil War, rodeo competitions emerged, with the first held in Deer Trail, Colorado, in 1869. Prescott, Arizona north of Phoenix claimed the distinction of holding the first professional rodeo, as it charged admission and awarded trophies in 1888. Between 1890 and 1910, rodeos became public entertainment; sometimes combined Wild West shows featuring individuals such as Buffalo Bill Cody, Annie Oakley, and other charismatic stars. By 1910, several major rodeos were established in western North America including the Calgary Stampede in Calgary, Alberta; the Pendleton Round-Up in northeastern Oregon, and the Cheyenne Frontier Days in Cheyenne, Wyoming.

On July 4, 1883, in the frontier town of Pecos an argument between Trav Windham, a cattle driver, and Morg Livingston, an accomplished cattle roper, led to what the Encyclopedia Britannica refers to as the "world's first public cowboy contest" and is often referred to as the first official rodeo. The two men chose to have the competition on the flatland on west side of the Pecos River. The July 4th public holiday allowed ranchers, cowboys and townsfolk to attend. Many other ranchers and cowboys chose to take part in the event including Jim Manning, John Chalk, and Brawley Oates, many whom traveled from distant ranches. Windham would end up winning the roping contest. Other winners include Pete Beard of Hashknife Ranch and Jeff Chism. Prize money was $40 and blue ribbons donated by a young resident.

Rodeo-type events also became popular for a time in the big cities of the Eastern United States, with large venues like Madison Square Garden playing a part in popularizing them for new crowds. There was no standardization of events for a rodeo competition until 1929, when associations began forming.

In the 1970s, rodeo saw unprecedented growth. Contestants referred to as "the new breed" brought rodeo increasing media attention. These contestants were young, often from an urban background, and chose rodeo for its athletic rewards. By 1985, one third of PRCA members had a college education and as many as one half of the competitors had never worked on a cattle ranch. Today, some professional rodeos are staged indoors in large, climate-controlled arenas and many are telecast. Other professional rodeos are held outdoors.

=== Women ===
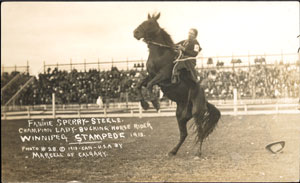
Fannie Sperry Steele, Champion Lady Bucking Horse Rider, Winnipeg Stampede, 1913

Historically, women have long participated in competitive rodeo. Prairie Rose Henderson debuted at the Cheyenne rodeo in 1901, and, by 1920, women were competing in rough stock events, relay races and trick riding. But after Bonnie McCarroll died in the Pendleton Round-Up in 1929 and Marie Gibson died in a horse wreck in 1933, women's competitive participation was curbed. Rodeo women organized into various associations and staged their own rodeos. Today, women's barrel racing is included as a competitive event in professional rodeo, with breakaway roping and goat tying added at collegiate and lower levels. They compete equally with men in team roping, sometimes in mixed-sex teams. Women also compete in traditional roping and rough stock events at women-only rodeos.

== Competitive events ==
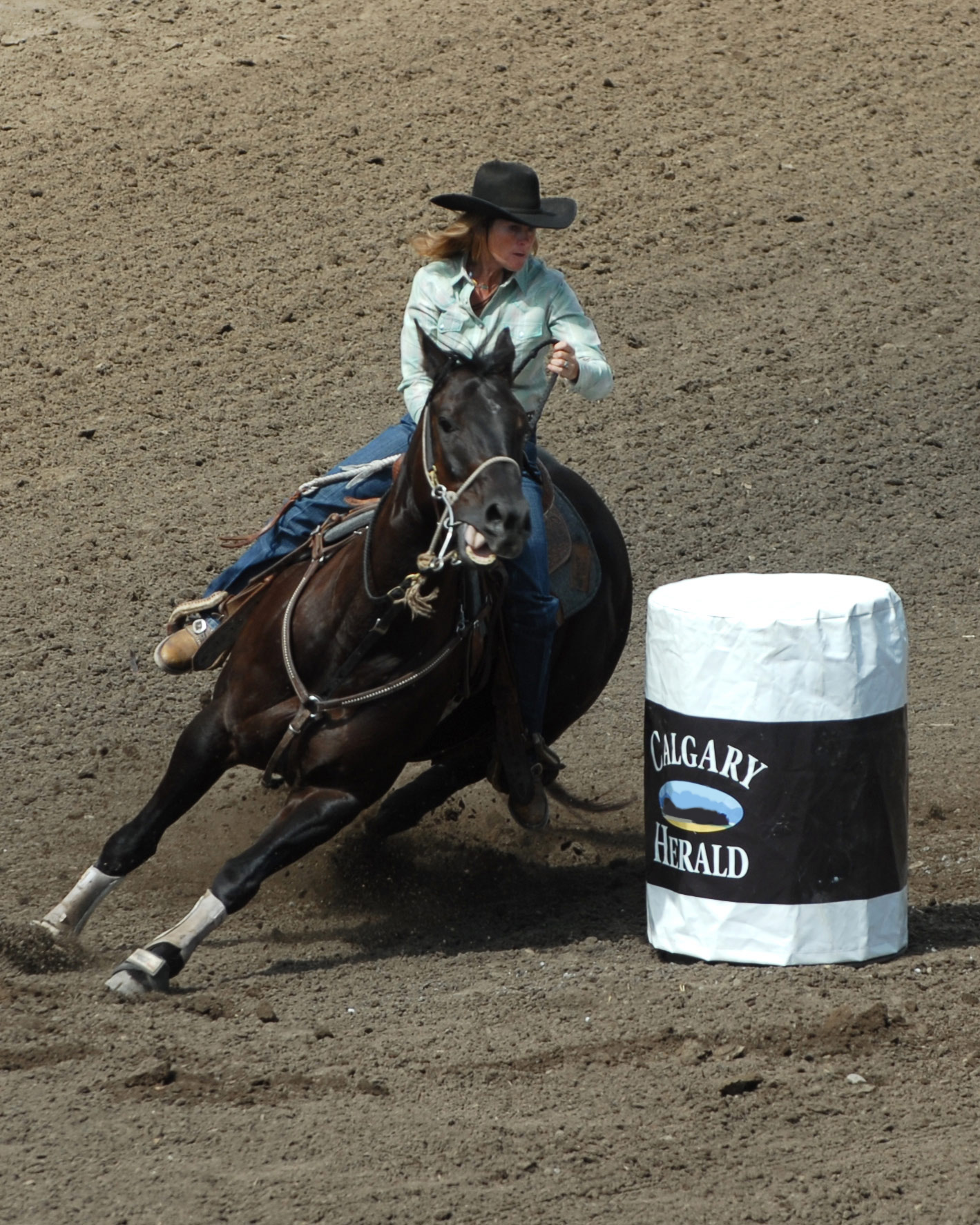
Barrel racing

Professional rodeos in the United States, Canada, Mexico, Australia, and New Zealand usually incorporate both timed events and rough stock events, most commonly tie-down roping, team roping, steer wrestling, saddle bronc and bareback bronc riding, bull riding, breakaway roping, and barrel racing. Additional events may be included at the collegiate and high school level, such as goat tying. Some events are based on traditional ranch practices; others are modern developments and have no counterpart in ranch practice.

Rodeos may also offer western-themed entertainment at intermission, including music and novelty acts, such as trick riding.

=== Timed events ===
Team roping, here, the steer has been roped by the header, and the heeler is now attempting a throw.

==== Roping ====
Roping competitions are based on the tasks of a working cowboy, who often had to capture calves and adult cattle for branding, medical treatment and other purposes. The cowboy must throw a type of rope with a loop, known as a lariat, riata or reata, or lasso, over the head of a calf or onto the horns and around the hind legs of adult cattle, and secure the animal in a fashion dictated by its size and age.

- Calf roping, also called tie-down roping in the United States and Canada and rope and tie in Australia and New Zealand, is based on ranch work in which calves are roped for branding, medical treatment, or other purposes. It is the oldest of rodeo's timed events. The cowboy ropes a running calf around the neck with a lariat, and his horse stops and sets back on the rope while the cowboy dismounts, runs to the calf, throws it to the ground and ties three feet together. (If the calf falls when roped, the cowboy must lose time waiting for the calf to get back to its feet so that the cowboy can do the work.) The job of the horse is to hold the calf steady on the rope. A well-trained calf-roping horse will slowly back up while the cowboy ties the calf, to help keep the lariat snug.
- Breakaway roping is a form of calf roping where a very short lariat is used, tied lightly to the saddle horn with string and a flag. When the calf is roped about the neck, the horse stops, the flagged rope breaks free of the saddle, and the calf runs on without being thrown or tied. In most of the United States, this event is primarily for women of all ages and boys under 12. In places where traditional "tie-down" calf roping is not allowed, riders of both genders compete.
- Team roping, also called heading and heeling, is the only rodeo event where men and women riders compete together. Two people capture and restrain a full-grown steer. One horse and rider, the "header," lassos a running steer's horns, while the other horse and rider, the "heeler," lassos the steer's two hind legs. Once the animal is captured, the riders face each other and lightly pull the steer between them, so that both ropes are taut. This technique originated from methods of capture and restraint for treatment used on a ranch.

==== Other timed events ====
- Barrel racing is a timed speed and agility event. In barrel racing, horse and rider gallop around a cloverleaf pattern of barrels, making agile turns without knocking the barrels over. In professional, collegiate and high school rodeo, barrel racing is an exclusively women's sport, though men and boys occasionally compete at local O-Mok-See competition.

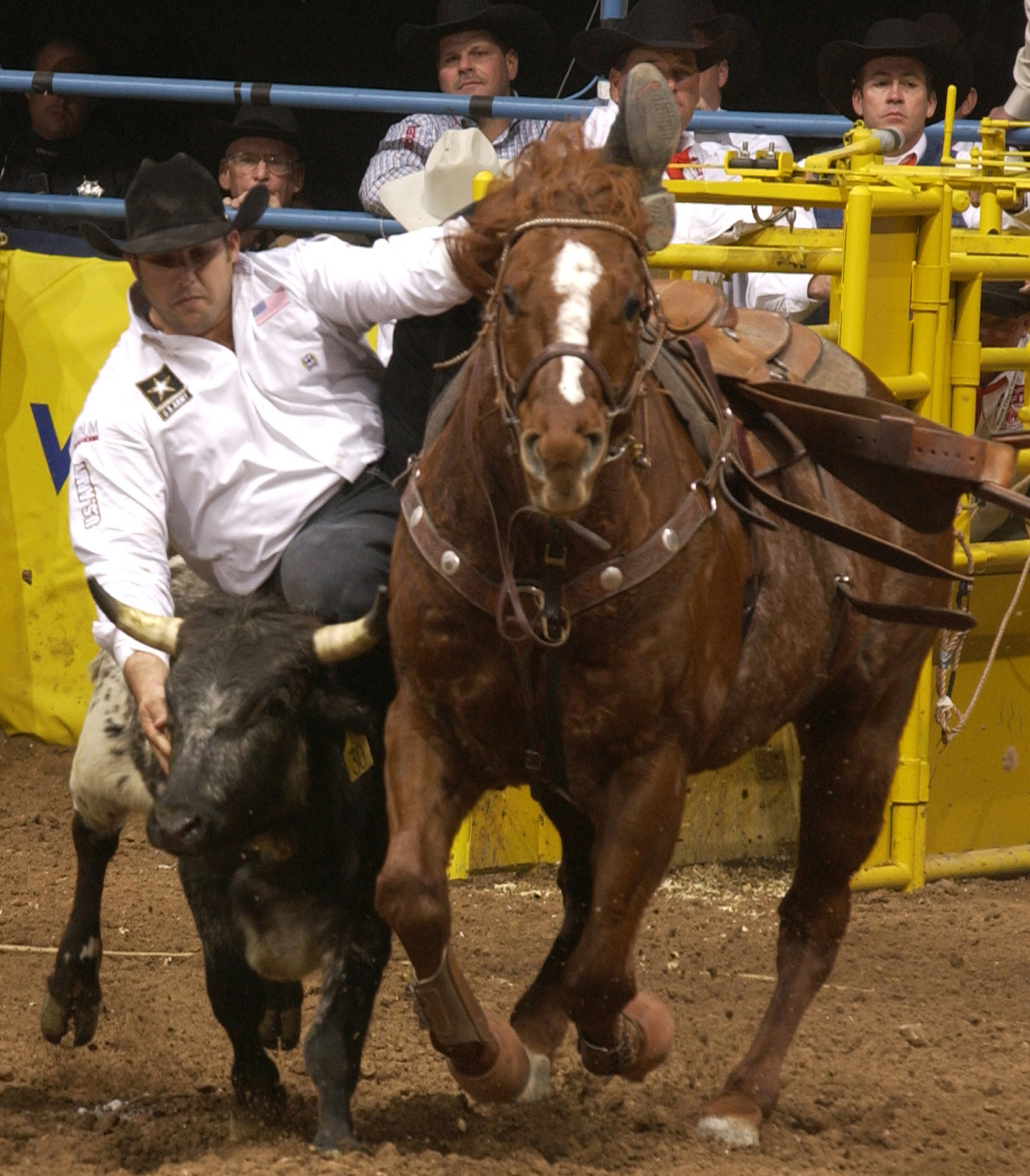
Steer wrestling

- Steer wrestling, also known as bulldogging, is a rodeo event where the rider jumps off his horse onto a Corriente steer and wrestles it to the ground by grabbing it by the horns. It is probably the single most physically dangerous event in rodeo for the cowboy, who runs a high risk of jumping off a running horse head first and missing the steer, or of having the thrown steer land on top of them, sometimes horns first.
- Goat tying is usually an event for women or pre-teen girls and boys; a goat is staked out while a mounted rider runs to the goat, dismounts, grabs the goat, throws it to the ground and ties it in the same manner as a calf. The horse must not come into contact with the goat or its tether. The event was designed to teach smaller or younger riders the basics of calf roping without requiring the more complex skill of roping the animal. This event is not part of professional rodeo competition.

=== "Rough stock" competition ===
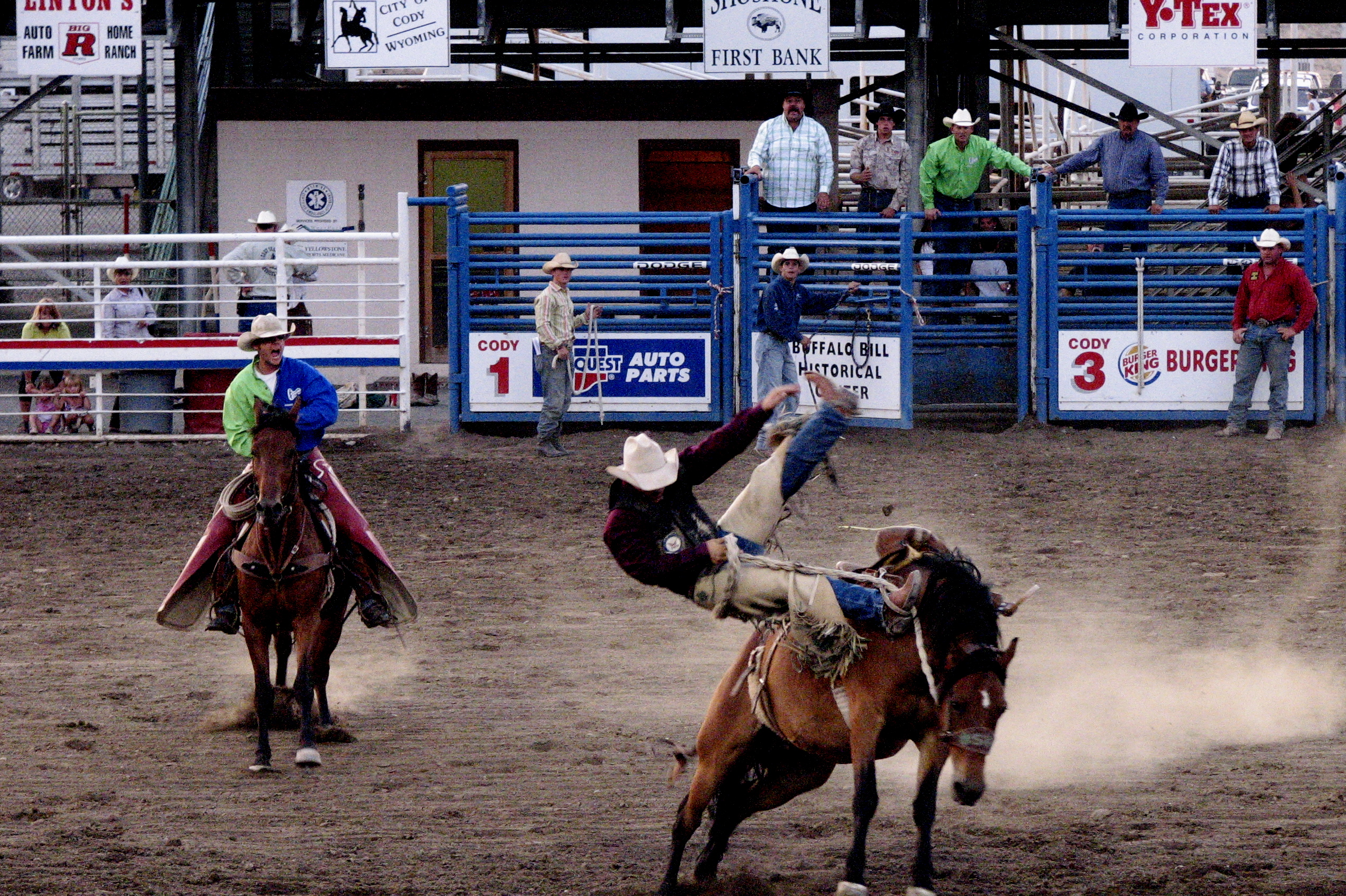
Saddle bronc riding; in rough stock events, the animal usually "wins."

In spite of popular myth, most modern "broncs" are not in fact wild horses, but are more commonly spoiled riding horses or horses bred specifically as bucking stock. Rough stock events also use at least two well-trained riding horses ridden by pickup riders (either men or women), tasked with assisting fallen riders and helping successful riders get safely off the bucking animal.

- Bronc riding – there are two divisions in rodeo; bareback bronc riding, where the rider is only allowed to hang onto a bucking horse with a type of surcingle called a rigging; and saddle bronc riding, where the rider uses a specialized western saddle without a horn (for safety) and hangs onto a heavy lead rope, called a bronc rein, which is attached to a halter on the horse.
- Bull riding is an event where the cowboys ride full-grown bucking bulls instead of horses. Although skills and equipment similar to those needed for bareback bronc riding are required, the event differs considerably from horse riding competition due to the danger involved. Because bulls are unpredictable and may attack a fallen rider, rodeo clowns, now known as "bullfighters", work during bull-riding competition to distract the bulls and help prevent injury to competitors.

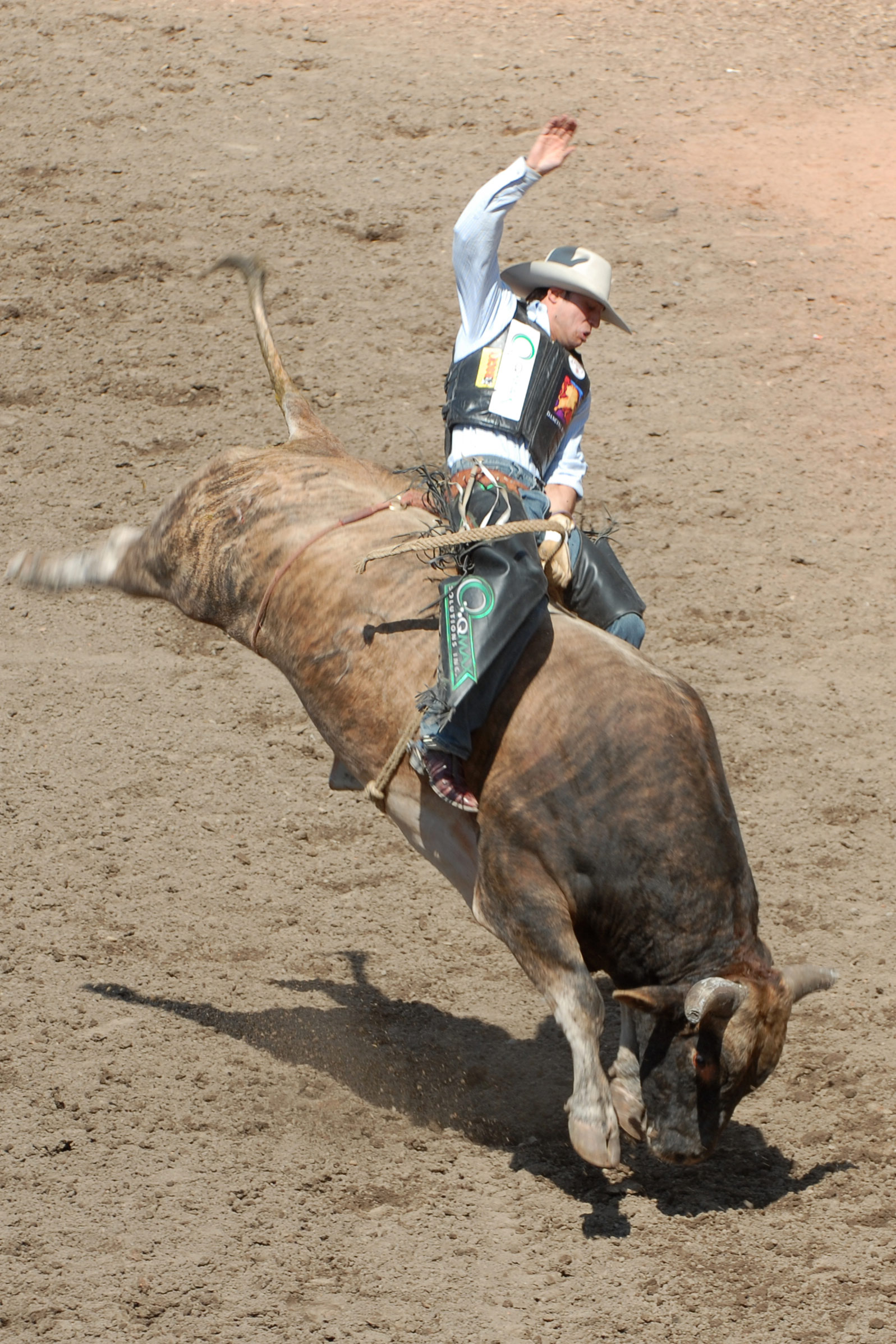
Bull riding

- Steer riding is a rough stock event for boys and girls where children ride steers, usually in a manner similar to bulls. Ages vary by region, as there is no national rule set for this event, but generally participants are at least eight years old and compete through about age 14. It is a training event for bronc riding and bull riding.

==== Less common events ====
Several other events may be scheduled on a rodeo program depending upon the rodeo's governing association.

- Steer roping is not listed as an official PRCA event, and banned in several states, but quietly recognized by the PRCA in some areas. It is rarely seen in the United States today because of the tremendous risk of injury to all involved, as well as animal cruelty concerns. A single roper ropes the steer around the horns, throws the rope around the steer's back hip, dallies, and rides in a ninety-degree angle to the roped steer (opposite side from the aforementioned hip). The action brings the steer's head around toward the legs in such a manner as to redirect the steer's head towards its back legs. This causes the steer to trip. Steers are too big to tie in the manner used for calves. Absent a "heeler," it is very difficult for one person to restrain a grown steer once down. However, the steer's trip causes it to be temporarily incapacitated allowing its legs to be tied in a manner akin to calf roping. The event has roots in ranch practices north of the Rio Grande, but is no longer seen at the majority of American rodeos. However, it is practiced at some rodeos in Mexico, and may also be referred to as "steer tripping."
- Steer daubing is usually seen at lower levels of competition and is an event to help young competitors learn skills later needed for steer wrestling. A rider carrying a long stick with a paint-filled dauber at the end attempts to run up alongside a steer and place a mark of paint inside a circle that has been drawn on the side of the animal.
- Pole bending is a speed and agility competition sometimes seen at local and high school rodeos. It is more commonly viewed as a gymkhana or O-Mok-See competition. In pole bending, the horse and rider run the length of a line of six upright poles, turn sharply and weave through the poles, turn again and weave back, then return to the start.
- Chute dogging is an event to teach pre-teen boys how to steer wrestle. The competitor enters a bucking chute with a small steer. The boy will then place his right arm around the steer's neck and left hand on top of its neck. When ready, the gate is opened and steer and contestant exit the chute. Once they cross over a designated line, the competitor will grab onto the horns of the steer (colloquially, to "hook-up" to the steer) and wrestle it to the ground.

=== Other activities ===
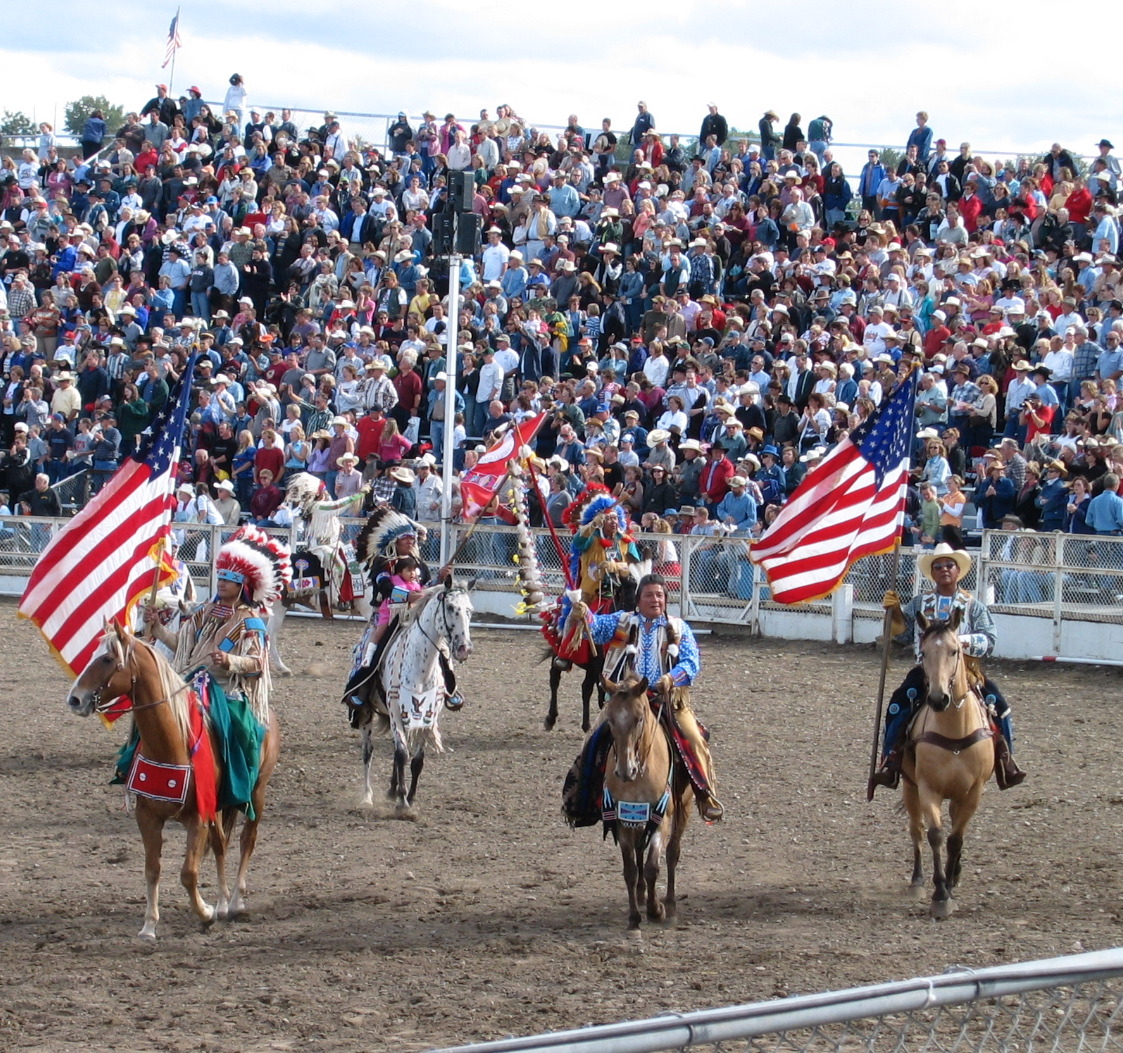
Grand Entry at the Pendleton Round-Up in Pendleton in northeast Oregon, September 2004

Outside of competitive events, other activities are often associated with rodeos, particularly at local levels. A typical rodeo begins with a "Grand Entry", in which mounted riders, many carrying flags, including the American flag, state flags, banners representing sponsors, and others enter the arena at a gallop, circle once, come to the center of the arena and stop while the remaining participants enter. The grand entry is used to introduce some of the competitors, officials, and sponsors. It is capped by the presentation of the American flag, usually with a rendition of "The Star-Spangled Banner," and, depending on region, other ceremonies. If a rodeo queen is crowned, the contestants or winner and runners-up may also be presented.

Variety acts, which may include musicians, trick riders or other entertainment may occur halfway through the rodeo at intermission. Some rodeos may also include novelty events, such as steer riding for preteens or mutton busting for small children. In some places, various types of novelty races or events such as wild cow milking are offered for adults. Such contests often are unregulated, with a higher risk of injury to human participants and poor treatment of animals than in traditionally-sanctioned events, particularly if consumption of alcoholic beverages by participants is permitted.

== Governing associations in the United States ==
Formal associations and detailed rules came late to rodeo. Until the mid-1930s, every rodeo was independent and selected its own events from among nearly one hundred different contests. Until World War I, there was little difference between rodeo and charreada. Athletes from the US, Mexico and Canada competed freely in all three countries. Later charreada was formalized as an amateur team sport and the international competitions ceased. It remains popular in Mexico and Hispanic communities of the U.S. today.

Numerous associations govern rodeo in the United States, each with slightly different rules and different events. The oldest and largest sanctioning body of professional rodeo is the Professional Rodeo Cowboys Association (PRCA) which governs about a third of all rodeos staged in the US annually. It was originally named the Cowboys Turtle Association, later became the Rodeo Cowboys Association, and finally the Professional Rodeo Cowboys Association in 1975. The PRCA crowns the World Champions at the National Finals Rodeo (NFR), in Las Vegas on the UNLV campus, featuring the top fifteen money-winners in seven events. The Houston Livestock Show and Rodeo hosts the largest regular-season professional rodeo in the world.

The Professional Bull Riders (PBR) is a more recent organization dedicated solely to bull riding. Rodeo gender bias was a problem for cowgirls, and in response women formed the Girls Rodeo Association in 1948 (now the Women's Professional Rodeo Association (WPRA) and held their own rodeos. The Women's Professional Rodeo Association (WPRA) is open exclusively to women. Women's barrel racing is governed by the WPRA, which holds finals for barrel racing along with the PRCA with the cowboys at the NFR. There are associations governing children's, teen, and college level rodeos as well as associations governing rodeo for gays, seniors, Native Americans and others.

There are also high-school rodeos, sponsored by the National High School Rodeo Association (NHSRA). Many colleges, particularly land grant colleges in the west, have rodeo teams. The National Intercollegiate Rodeo Association (NIRA) is responsible for the College National Finals Rodeo (CNFR) held each June in Casper, Wyoming northwest of Laramie. Other rodeo governing bodies in the United States include American Junior Rodeo Association (AJRA) for contestants under twenty years of age; National Little Britches Rodeo Association (NLBRA), for youths ages five to eighteen; Senior Pro Rodeo (SPR), for people forty years old or over; and the International Gay Rodeo Association. Each association has its own regulations and its own method of determining champions. Athletes participate in rodeos sanctioned by their own governing body or one that has a mutual agreement with theirs and their points count for qualification to their Association Finals. Rodeo committees must pay sanctioning fees to the appropriate governing bodies, and employ the needed stock contractors, judges, announcers, bull fighters, and barrel men from their approved lists. Other nations have similar sanctioning associations.

Until recently, the most important was PRCA, which crowns the World Champions at the National Finals Rodeo (NFR), held since 1985 in Las Vegas, Nevada, featuring the top fifteen money winners in seven events. The athletes who have won the most money, including NFR earnings, in each event are the World's Champions. However, since 1992, Professional Bull Riders (PBR) has drawn many top bull riders, and holds its own multimillion-dollar individual-season World Finals in the Dallas-Fort Worth metroplex every spring and Team Series Championship in Las Vegas every autumn since 2022. Women's barrel racing is governed by the WPRA, and holds its finals along with the PRCA with the cowboys at the NFR.

Contemporary rodeo is a lucrative business. More than 7,500 cowboys compete for over thirty million dollars at 650 rodeos annually. Women's barrel racing, sanctioned by the WPRA, has taken place at most of these rodeos. Over 2,000 barrel racers compete for nearly four million dollars annually. Professional cowgirls also compete in bronc and bull riding, team roping and calf roping under the auspices of the PWRA, a WPRA subsidiary. However, numbers are small, about 120 members, and these competitors go largely unnoticed, with only twenty rodeos and seventy individual contests available annually. The total purse at the PWRA National Finals is $50,000. Meanwhile, the PBR has 800 members from three continents and ten million dollars in prize money.

== Canada ==
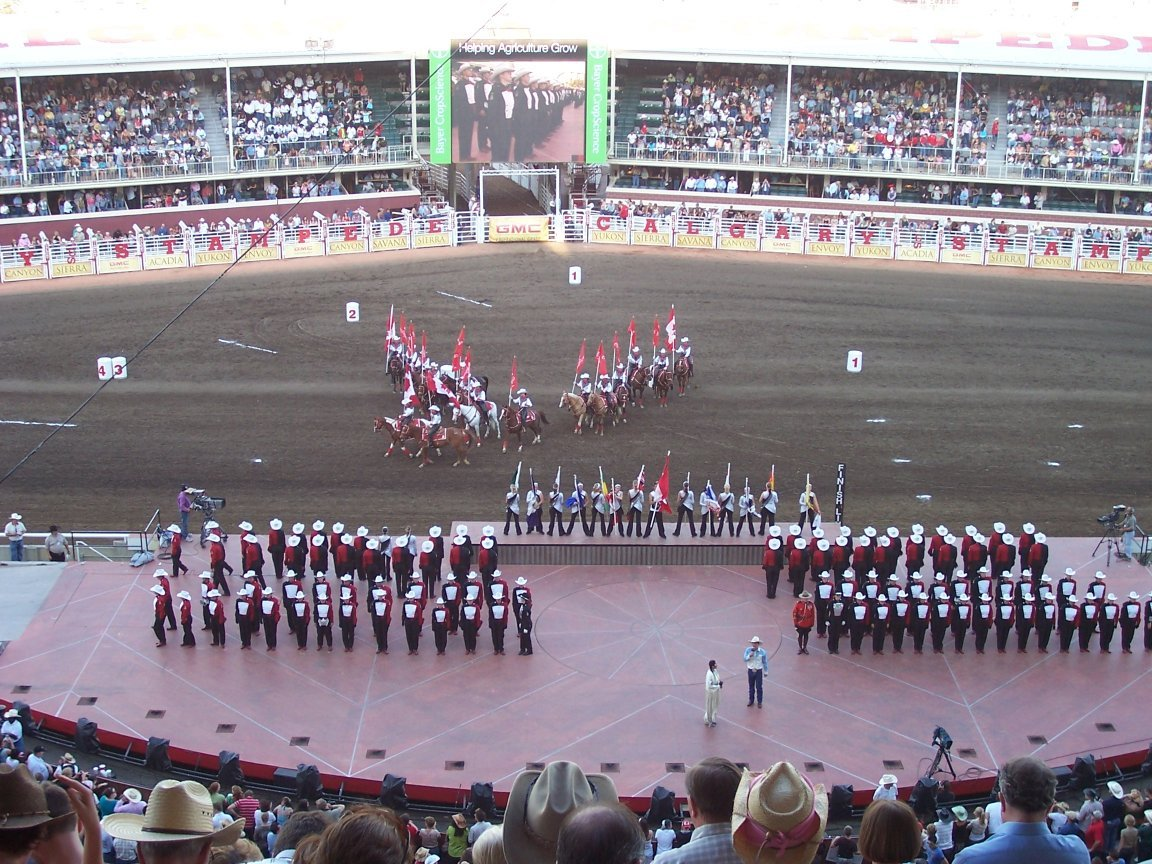
The Calgary Stampede field with marching band onstage in Calgary, Alberta, 2007

The first rodeo in Canada was held in 1902 in Raymond, Alberta, when Raymond Knight funded and promoted a rodeo contest for bronc riders and steer ropers called the Raymond Stampede. Knight also coined the rodeo term stampede and built rodeo's first known shotgun-style bucking chute. In 1903, Knight built Canada's first rodeo arena and grandstand and became the first rodeo producer and rodeo stock contractor.

In 1912, Guy Weadick and several investors put up $100,000 to create what today is the Calgary Stampede, now the largest rodeo in Canada. The Stampede also incorporated mythical and historical elements, including Native Indians in full regalia, chuckwagon races, the Mounted Police, and marching bands. From its beginning, the event has been held the second week in July, and since 1938, attendees were urged to dress for the occasion in western hats to add to the event's flavour.

By 2003, it was estimated that 65 professional rodeos involving 700 members of the Canadian Professional Rodeo Association (CPRA) took place in Western Canada, along with professionals from the United States. Many Canadian contestants were part-timers who did not earn a significant living from rodeo.

Canadians made several significant contributions to the sport of rodeo. In 1916, at the Bascom Ranch in Welling, Alberta, southwest of Medicine Hat. John W. Bascom and his sons Raymond, Mel, and Earl designed and built rodeo's first side-delivery bucking chute for the ranch rodeos they were producing. In 1919, Earl and John made rodeo's first reverse-opening side-delivery bucking chute at the Bascom Ranch in Lethbridge in southern Alberta. The Bascom-style bucking chute is now rodeo's standard design. Earl Bascom also continued his innovative contributions to the sport of rodeo by designing and making rodeo's first hornless bronc saddle in 1922, rodeo's first one-hand bareback rigging in 1924, and the first high-cut rodeo chaps in 1928. Earl and his brother Weldon also produced rodeo's first night rodeo held outdoors under electric lights in 1935.

The Canadian Pro Rodeo Hall of Fame is located in Ponoka, Alberta.

== Minority participation in the United States and Canada ==
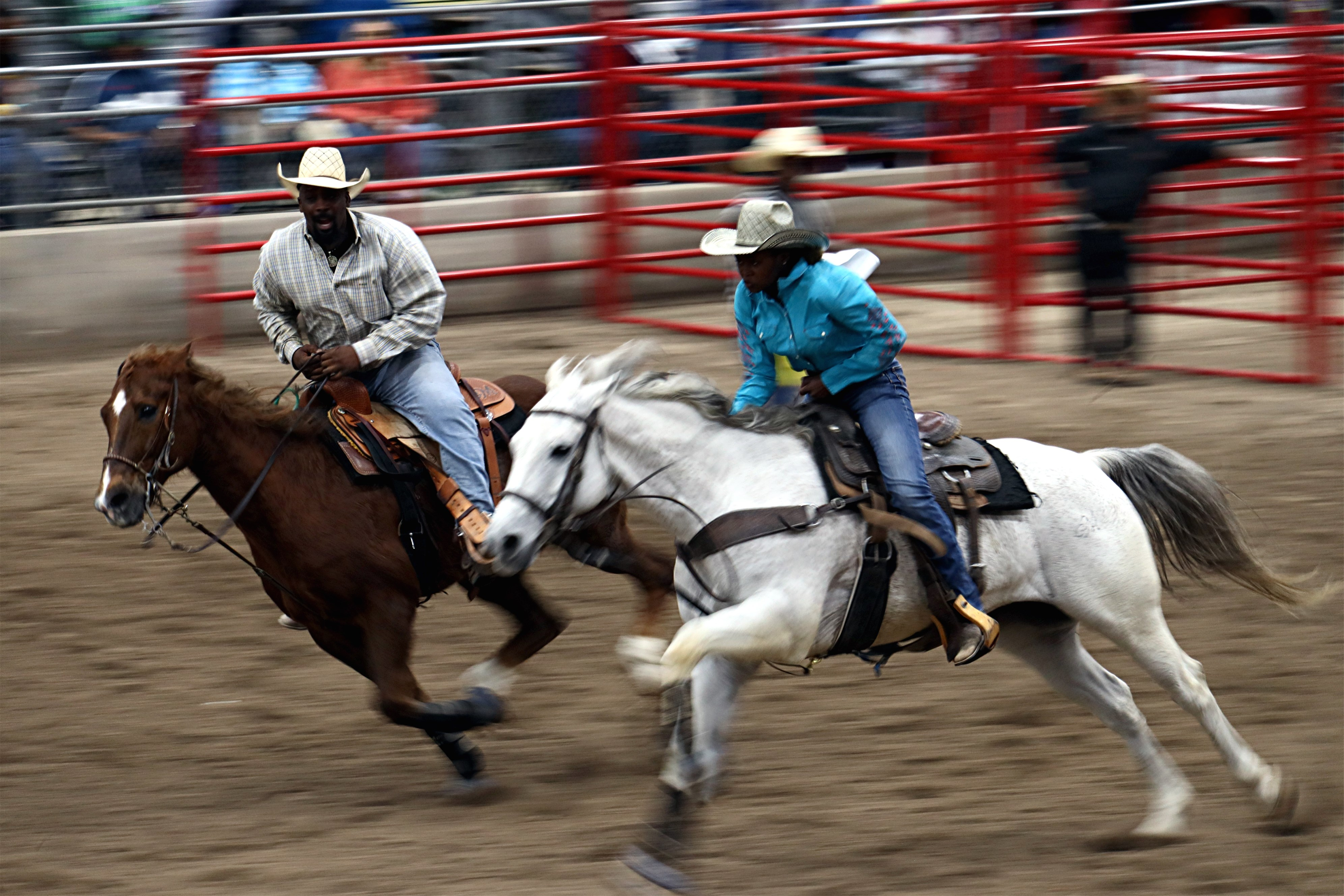
Riders at the Black Heritage Day Rodeo presented by the Black Professional Cowboys and Cowgirls Association in Humble, Texas in 2022

Native American and Hispanic cowboys compete in modern rodeos in small numbers. African Americans constitute a smaller minority of rodeo contestants, though many early rodeo champions, such as Nat Love, were African American. Bill Pickett and bronc rider Bill Stahl were both elected to the Cowboy Hall of Fame. During the 1940s and 1950s, African Americans created the Southwestern Colored Cowboys Association. Although the PRCA never formally excluded people of color, pre-1960s racism effectively kept many minority participants, particularly African Americans, out of white competitions. In the 1960s, bull rider Myrtis Dightman vied for national honors and qualified for the National Finals Rodeo. In the 1990s, the Black World Championship Rodeo was held in New York City and other locations across the United States. Mexican Americans have had a long history with both rodeo and charreada. In spite of its long association with southwestern culture, there has been significant assimilation and cross-acculturation. Mexican Americans are so integrated into the southwestern cowboy culture that they are not visibly distinct. Brazilians also have a long and successful history of bull riding in the United States. In 2017, 37% of the top 35 riders in the Professional Bull Riding circuit were Brazilian.

In 1976, the first gay rodeo was held in Reno, Nevada, as a charity fundraiser. Several regional gay rodeo organizations were formed in the following years, and, in 1985, the existing organizations formed the International Gay Rodeo Association as a national sanctioning body. The melding of homosexuality and straight cowboy culture in gay rodeo simultaneously embraces archetypal Cowboy Code traits and contemporary gay identity. Openly gay competitors stage their own rodeos because they are not welcomed in the straight circuit. "We can ride with the best of them," one person stated, "But they don't want us around."

== Latin America ==
=== Mexico ===
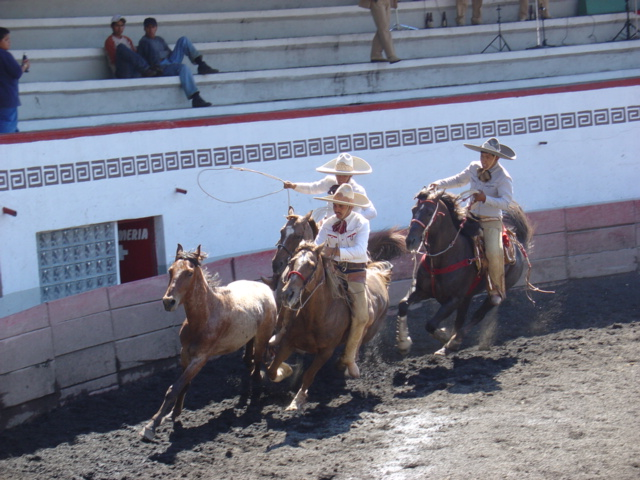
El Paso de la Muerte (The Pass of Death), a charreada event

Charrería is the national sport of Mexico. It is a display and contest of roping and riding with origins tracing to the cattle ranching life and culture of colonial Mexico from the 16th century. Over time, it became an event that included games, parades, foods, and contests involving riders, cattle, and horses. Following the Mexican Revolution of 1910, many rural Mexicans were displaced and took up residence in cities, where urban-based charros and others formed associations to establish and refine the charreada.

During the Chicano Movement of the 1970s, Mexican Americans revitalized their heritage by establishing the event in the United States. The event historically enjoys greater prestige in Mexico, however, and due to animal cruelty concerns, some charreada events have been banned in the US. Unlike rodeos, most charreadas do not award money to the winners as charreada is considered an amateur sport, but trophies may be distributed. Until recently, the charreada was confined to men, but a women's precision equestrian event called the escaramuza is the fourth in a total of ten events in a charreada. Unlike American rodeo, events are not timed, but judged and scored based on finesse and grace.

American rodeo has had an established presence in Mexico's northern-border states since the late 1970s. Throughout the 1980s and 1990s, it gained ground in numerous regions of central states. The Federación Mexicana de Rodeo (Mexican Rodeo Federation) was formed in 1992 as the governing body of the sport in the country. The Campeonato Nacional de Rodeo (National Rodeo Championship), sanctioned by said organization and held consistently since 2000, has been held to determine the national champions in American rodeo. The annual event is held in Chihuahua City, Chihuahua. Rodeo Saltillo, held every October in Saltillo, Coahuila, is the largest rodeo in Mexico.

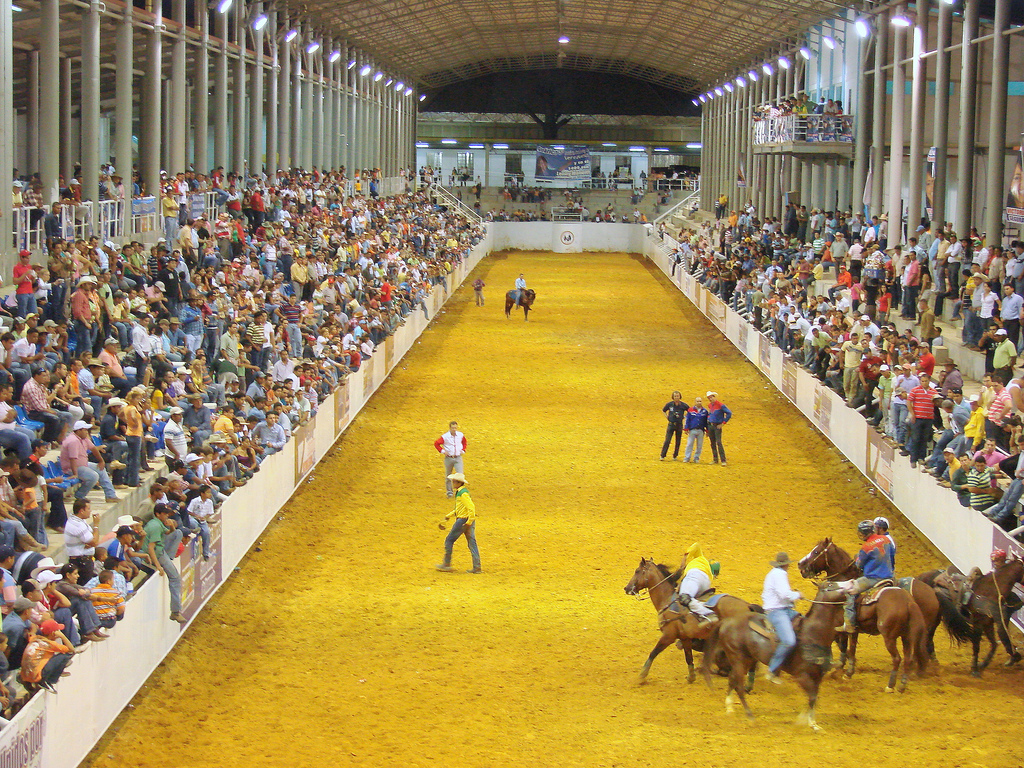
Coleo

=== Colombia and Venezuela ===
Coleo is a traditional Venezuelan and Colombian sport, similar to American rodeo, where a small group of llaneros (cowboys) on horseback pursue cattle at high speeds through a narrow pathway (called a manga de coleo) in order to drop or tumble them. Coleos are usually presented as a side attraction to a larger event, such as a religious festival. They are very popular in Venezuela and in parts of Colombia, mostly in the plains (llanos). A coleo starts with the participants and a calf or bull (this depends on the age and stature of the competitors) locked behind a trap door. The trap door leads to a narrow earthen pathway about 100 metres long with high guard rails, open at the other end. When a judge gives a signal, the calf is set loose and starts running. A couple of seconds later, the riders are released and they race to grab the calf by its tail. The rider who accomplishes this first will increase speed, dragging the calf until it finally stumbles. The object is to accomplish that in the shortest time.

=== Brazil ===
Brazilian rodeios can be traced to the town of Barretos, where the primary economic activities involved livestock and its transport to other locations; one of the ways the cowboys entertained themselves was by riding the animals. In 1956, the first ever Festa do Peão de Barretos was created and as the years went by, this rodeo became the biggest in Brazil and in Latin America. Barretos is the most famous rodeo in Brazil. However, rodeos are very common in inner state towns in Brazil, especially in Rio Grande do Sul, Mato Grosso do Sul, Parana and São Paulo state. Bull riding is a significant sport in the country; Since 2006, PBR runs a national circuit in Brazil, and Brazilian riders are a major presence on the main PBR circuit in the United States. PBR also hosts a Brazilian Finals. Apart from PBR Brazil, there are also a number of other bull riding and rodeo organizations in the country. Brazil also has its own unique style of bronc riding, called cutiano.

=== Argentina ===
In the twentieth century, rodeo's popularity increased in Argentina. Buenos Aires, Rosario, and other major cities hosted rodeos. In 1909, the Sociedad Sportiva Argentina (Argentina Sports Society) announced a rodeo competition in which the winners would eventually compete in the United States against rodeo performers from other countries.

=== Chile ===
Second to association football (soccer), rodeo is the most popular sport in Chile, and became the national sport of Chile on January 10, 1962, by decree number 269 of the National Council of Sports and the Chilean Olympic Committee.

Chilean rodeo traces to the 16th century, beginning with gathering together lost or stray cattle in the Plaza de Armas de Santiago for branding and selection. Rodeos began to be regulated in the 17th century and talented riders received honors and awards.

In Chilean rodeo, a team of two mounted men (called a collera) attempt to pin a calf against large cushions lining the arena (medialuna). Points are earned for proper technique. Chilean Horses are employed to the exclusion of others and riders wear traditional huaso garb as a requirement. The sport has become so popular that in 2004, more spectators attended rodeo events than professional football matches. Chilean rodeo has experienced financial woes, lack of political support and poor promotion. Unlike other Chilean sports, rodeo does not receive any of the revenue from Chiledeportes because only sports that represent Chile overseas receive funds. The Chilean Rodeo Federation has criticized the lack of governmental funding and has pointed out that rodeo reaches a part of the population that does not have access to other Chilean sports.

=== El Salvador ===
In El Salvador, rodeo is very popular. They are also called jaripeos and are celebrated mainly during each municipality's festivities. Traditionally, people dress up as cowboys or wear clothing related to raising cattle.

The history of rodeos/jaripeos originates in Metapán (considered the rodeo/jaripeo capital of El Salvador). Stories from neighbors indicate that the first Metapán jaripeo was held in 1937 on a property located on Las Parejas street, with a wild colt. Then came bull riding, sparking competition between the ranches of that time. After its popularity began to spread, in 1965 a group of ranchers built a coliseum. In later years, rodeo and jaripeo have spread throughout El Salvador, becoming a livestock tradition.

== Australia and the Pacific ==
=== Australia ===
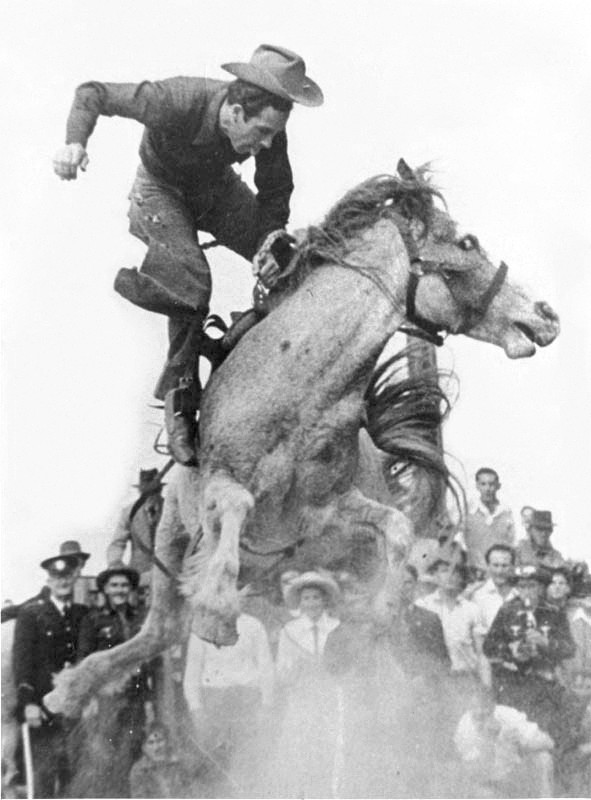
Alan Wood on the great bucking mare, Curio; photo taken shortly before Wood regained his seat and then made the required time

Rodeos have long been a popular competitor and spectator sport in Australia, but were not run on an organized basis until the 1880s. The National Agricultural Society of Victoria ran one of the earliest recorded events in 1888, when a roughriding competition was held at their annual show. Travelling tent rodeo shows increased the popularity of roughriding throughout much of Australia. However, by 1930, the Great Depression left only a few of these traveling shows on the road.

Bushmen's Carnivals, the Australian equivalent of American rodeos, originated in Northern New South Wales in the 1920s and were well established by the 1930s. Australian rodeo continued to grow following WWII, and by September 1978 riders from the US, Canada, New Zealand and Australia competed in the World Rodeo Titles there for prize money totaling $60,000. In 1982, an Australian Bushmen's Carnival Association team competed in the North American Rodeo Commission's championships in Denver finishing sixth overall.

In August 1944 the Australian Bushmen's Carnival Association (ABCA) was formed by the Royal Agricultural Society of New South Wales, as a result of the increase in the number of bushmen's carnivals. The purpose of this formation was to standardize regulations and rules, but insufficient support was given and the association was terminated in 1947. The Australian Professional Rodeo Association (APRA) was also formed in 1944 and is the national governing body for professional rodeo competition. Also formed in 1944 was the Australian Rough-Riders Association (ARRA) in South Australia. On 28 March 1946 the Northern (N.S.W.) Bushmen's Carnival Association was founded in Maitland, New South Wales north of Newcastle. The two associations are now the Australian Bushmen's Campdraft & Rodeo Association (ABCRA). The ABCRA is the largest rodeo and campdraft organization in Australia. In May 1992 the National Rodeo Council of Australia (NRCA) was formed to further the sport of rodeo and has represented ABCRA and several other associations.

Original events included buckjumping (saddle broncs), bullock riding, campdrafting, bulldogging, wild-cow milking, wild bullock races, wild horse races and releasing the surcingle. Other common sporting events such as flag and bending races (similar to pole bending) were held for the competitors' horses.

Later the term rodeo became more commonly used, with American saddles used; the events also took on American naming patterns. The ABCRA now affiliates the sports of campdrafting, roughriding (saddle bronc and bareback riding, steer and bull riding) and timed rodeo events: barrel races (ladies' and junior), rope and tie, steer undecorating (ladies'), steer wrestling, junior calf riding, team roping and breakaway roping (ladies'). There are strict standards for the selection, care and treatment of rodeo livestock, arenas, plus equipment requirements and specifications. In 1992 the National Rodeo Queen Quest was founded by the National Rodeo Council of Australia to promote and encourage young women into the sport of rodeo.

The carnivals and rodeos typically take place during the spring and summer, and are usually arranged to avoid date clashes, so that competitors may take part in as many events as possible. The prize money is obtained from donations and entry fees, with the main prize money being for the open campdraft event.

The biggest rodeos are in Queensland, with the largest being the Mount Isa Mines Rodeo, held every August. Some large events are also held in New South Wales, where Sydney has a rodeo during the Royal Agricultural Society show and Walcha holds a four-day campdrafting and rodeo competition annually. There also is a National Finals Rodeo.

=== New Zealand ===
There are approximately 30 annual rodeos held in New Zealand. They run from the summer and autumn months and are all under the banner of the New Zealand Rodeo Cowboys Association (NZRCA). The organization formed in 1973, when the North Island Buck Jumpers Association and the South Island Buck Jumpers Association amalgamated. The Methven Rodeo in Canterbury, held every Labour Day weekend in October, is the largest regular-season rodeo in the country. The National Finals Rodeo, held in different locations every year in March, crowns the national champions in each rodeo event.

=== Philippines ===
In the Philippines, rodeo was introduced in the island during the American colonial era in the Philippines by the then-Acting Governor of the Department of Mindanao and Sulu Teofisto Guingona Sr. setting up ranches in Impasugong, Bukidnon and Wao, Lanao del Sur. Rodeo is recognized today as the provincial sport of Bukidnon. Rodeo events have also been held in the province of Masbate, known for its cattle industry; it was declared the "Rodeo Capital of the Philippines" in 2002 by President Gloria Macapagal Arroyo. The province-wide festival Rodeo Masbateño was first organized in 1993, to promote Masbate's cattle industry and boost its tourism.

=== Hawaii ===
Ranching and cowboy culture in Hawaii developed in the early 19th century following the introduction of cattle and horses to the Hawaiian islands. During the reign of Kamehameha III, Mexican vaqueros were invited to Hawaii to teach native Hawaiians cattle-handling techniques; including roping, livestock management, hide preparation, fencing, and horsemanship. These skills combined with existing traditional Hawaiian culture created a distinct cowboy culture. The Hawaiian cowboy became known as the "Paniolo."

The Paniolo tradition became internationally recognized in the early 20th century. In 1908, Hawaiian cowboys from Parker Ranch competed at the Frontier Days rodeo in Cheyenne, Wyoming, one of the largest rodeo events in the United States. Ikua Purdy won the steer roping championship, while Archie Ka'au'a placed second and Jack Low placed sixth. Their success brough national attention to Hawaiian ranching and demonstrated the skill of the paniolo competitors in comparison with mainland American Cowboys. Today, paniolo culture remains an important part of Hawaiian history and identity. Ranching traditions continue through working ranches, rodeos and cultural events.

== Animal treatment controversies ==
Protests were first raised regarding rodeo animal cruelty in the 1870s, and, beginning in the 1930s, some states enacted laws curtailing rodeo activities and other events involving animals. In the 1950s, the then Rodeo Cowboys Association (RCA, later the PRCA) worked with the American Humane Association (AHA) to establish regulations protecting the welfare of rodeo animals that were acceptable to both organizations. The PRCA realized that public education regarding rodeo and the welfare of animals was needed to keep the sport alive.

Over the years, conditions for animals in rodeo and many other sporting events improved. Today, the PRCA and other rodeo sanctioning organizations have stringent regulations to ensure rodeo animals' welfare. For example, these rules require, among other things, provisions for injured animals, a veterinarian's presence at all rodeos (a similar requirement exists for other equine events), padded flank straps, horn protection for steers, and spurs with dulled, free-spinning rowels. Rodeo competitors in general value and provide excellent care to the animals with which they work. Animals must also be protected with fleece-lined flank straps for bucking stock and horn wraps for roping steers.

Laws governing rodeo vary widely. In the American west, some states incorporate the regulations of the PRCA into their statutes as a standard by which to evaluate if animal cruelty has occurred. On the other hand, some events and practices are restricted or banned in other states, including California, Rhode Island, and Ohio. St. Petersburg, Florida is the only locality in the United States with a complete ban on rodeo. Canadian Humane Societies are careful in criticizing Canadian rodeo as the event has become so indigenous to Western Canada that criticism may jeopardize support for the organization's other humane goals. The Calgary Humane Society itself is wary of criticizing the famous Calgary Stampede. Internationally rodeo itself is banned in the United Kingdom and the Netherlands, and other European nations have placed restrictions on certain practices.

However, a number of humane and animal rights organizations have policy statements that oppose many rodeo practices and often the events themselves. Some also claim that regulations vary from vague to ineffective and are frequently violated. Other groups assert that any regulation still allows rodeo animals to be subjected to gratuitous harm for the sake of entertainment, and therefore rodeos should be banned altogether.

In response to these concerns, a number of cities and states, mostly in the eastern half of the United States, have passed ordinances and laws governing rodeo. Pittsburgh, Pennsylvania, for example, specifically prohibits electric prods or shocking devices, wire tie-downs, and sharpened or fixed spurs or rowels. It also previously prohibited flank straps. Pittsburgh also requires humane officers be provided access to any and all areas where animals may go—specifically pens, chutes, and injury pens. However, the ban on rodeo events has been at least partially lifted, since the Professional Bull Riders (PBR) have held an annual event in Pittsburgh since 2025. A flank strap is used on every bucking bull that performs in the PBR. It is a soft cotton rope tied relatively loosely around the haunches of the bull, used to encourage a genetically pre-disposed bucking bull to kick. A licensed veterinarian is present at all PBR events. The state of Rhode Island has banned tie-down roping and certain other practices. Other locales have similar ordinances and laws.

=== Positions taken by animal welfare organizations ===
There are three basic areas of concern to various groups. The first set of concerns surround relatively common rodeo practices, such as the use of bucking straps, also known as flank straps, the use of metal or electric cattle prods, and tail-twisting. The second set of concerns surround non-traditional rodeo events that operate outside the rules of sanctioning organizations. These are usually amateur events such as mutton busting, calf dressing, wild cow milking, calf riding, chuck wagon races, and other events designed primarily for publicity, half-time entertainment or crowd participation. Finally, some groups consider some or all rodeo events themselves to be cruel.

Groups such as PETA, SHARK, and the Humane Society of the United States generally take a position of opposition to all rodeos and rodeo events. A more general position is taken by the ASPCA, only opposing rodeo events that "involve cruel, painful, stressful and potentially harmful treatment of livestock, not only in performance but also in handling, transport and prodding to perform." The group singles out children's rodeo events such as goat tying, calf riding and sheep riding (“mutton busting”), "which do not promote humane care and respect for animals."

The American Humane Association (AHA) does not appear to oppose rodeos per se, though they have a general position on events and contests involving animals, stating that "when animals are involved in entertainment, they must be treated humanely at all times." The AHA also has strict requirements for the treatment of animals used for rodeo scenes in movies, starting with the rules of the PRCA and adding additional requirements consistent with the association's other policies. Unique among animal protection groups, the ASPCA specifically notes that practice sessions are often the location of more severe abuses than competitions. However, many state animal cruelty laws provide specific exemptions for "training practices." The American Humane Association is the only organization addressing the legislative issue, advocating the strengthening of animal cruelty laws in general, with no exceptions for "training practices."

=== Modern practice ===
It is a myth that a modern bucking horse is a wild animal. The modern bronc is not a truly feral horse. Some bucking horses are riding horses that learned to buck off their riders. Other bucking horses are specifically bred for use in rodeos.

A proven bucking horse can be sold for $8000 to $10,000 or more, making rough stock a valuable investment worth caring for and keeping in good health for many years. Likewise, bucking bulls are also selectively bred. Most are allowed to grow up in a natural, semi-wild condition on the open range, but also have to be trained in order to be managed from the ground, safely loaded into trailers, vaccinated and wormed, and be loaded in and out of bucking chutes.

Young bucking horses are initially introduced to work with cloth dummies attached to the saddle. Others are already well-trained on the ground. Some champion bucking horses got their start as riding horses that learned how to quickly and effectively unseat riders. Due to the rigors of travel and the short bursts of high intensity work required, most horses in a bucking string are at least six or seven years old before they are used extensively, and are expected to be sound performers for many years. Awards are given to the owners of the best bucking horses, who are respected as equine athletes and perform for many years. Many are retired to pasture at the end of their careers. Many bucking horses understand their job well and reduce or stop their bucking, even while still wearing a flank strap, as soon as they either unseat the rider or hear the buzzer.

=== Industry position ===
Modern rodeos in the United States are closely regulated and have responded to accusations of animal cruelty by instituting a number of rules to guide how rodeo animals are to be managed. In 1994, a survey of 28 sanctioned rodeos was conducted by on-site independent veterinarians. Reviewing 33,991 animal runs, the injury rate was documented at 16 animals or 0.047 percent, less than five-hundredths of one percent or one in 2000 animals. A study of rodeo animals in Australia found a similar injury rate. Basic injuries occurred at a rate of 0.072 percent, or one in 1405, with injuries requiring veterinary attention at 0.036 percent, or one injury in every 2810 times the animal was used, and transport, yarding and competition were all included in the study. A later PRCA survey of 60,971 animal performances at 198 rodeo performances and 73 sections of "slack" indicated 27 animals were injured, again approximately five-hundredths of 1 percent—0.044.

Nonetheless, accusation of cruelty in the USA persist. The PRCA acknowledges that they only sanction about 30 percent of all rodeos, while another 50 percent are sanctioned by other organizations and 20 percent are completely unsanctioned. The PRCA opposes the general concept of animal rights, but supports animal welfare. The PRCA takes the position that the organization does this and even goes beyond expectation. Not all rodeos are governed by the PRCA however, though organizations governing collegiate and high school rodeos base their rules on those of the PRCA. Nonetheless, certain amateur and "backyard" rodeos are unregulated, and do not follow PRCA rules.

Advocates for rodeo say that sick, injured, hungry, or severely abused animals cannot perform well in a given event. Rough stock must be healthy and well fed to give the cowboy a powerful and challenging ride sufficient to obtain a high score. The bucking strap has to be an incentive to an animal that already wants to buck off a rider, not a prod, or the animal will either flee the pain, not buck, quickly sour and refuse to work, regardless of any pain that might be inflicted. Steers and roping calves will not break from the chute fast enough for ropers to achieve a fast time if they are lame or weak, and because of size and weight restrictions for each event, they are not generally used for more than a single season.

Health regulations mandate vaccinations and blood testing of animals crossing state lines, so rodeo stock receives routine care. An injured animal will not buck well and hence a cowboy cannot obtain a high score for his ride, so sick or injured animals are not run through the chutes, but instead are given appropriate veterinary care so they can be returned to their usual level of strength and power. PRCA regulations require veterinarians to be available at all rodeos to treat both bucking stock and other animals as needed.

The PRCA emphasizes that they first promulgated rules for proper and humane treatment of livestock in 1947, a full seven years before the founding of the Humane Society of the United States. Participants are fined for animal abuse, and a study of 21 PRCA rodeos found only 15 animals injured in 26,584 performances, a 0.06 percent rate.

There are occasions of rule violations and animal mistreatment at sanctioned rodeos. The major national rodeos are also under the most intense scrutiny and are the most likely to rigorously follow the rules. Rodeos not subject to the rules of the PRCA or other organizations, and rodeos outside of the United States and Canada, where animal cruelty laws are weaker, are more likely to be the sites of abusive practices.

== In popular culture ==
The largest state-of-the-art rodeos are professional, commercial athletic contests held in climate-controlled stadiums, with broadcasting by various television networks. Outside of the rodeo world itself, there is disagreement about exactly what rodeo is. Professional competitors, for example, view rodeo as a sport and call themselves professional athletes while also using the title of cowboy. Fans view rodeo as a spectator sport with animals, having aspects of pageantry and theater unlike other professional sport. Non-westerners view the spectacle as a quaint but exciting remnant of the Wild West while animal rights activists view rodeo as a cruel Roman circus spectacle, or an Americanized bullfight.

Anthropologists studying the sport of rodeo and the culture surrounding it have commented that it is "a blend of both performance and contest", and that rodeo is far more expressive in blending both these aspects than attempting to stand alone on one or the other. Rodeo's performance level permits pageantry and ritual which serve to "revitalize the spirit of the Old West" while its contest level poses a man-animal opposition that articulates the transformation of nature and "dramatizes and perpetuates the conflict between the wild and the tame." "On its deepest level, rodeo is essentially a ritual addressing itself to the dilemma of man's place in nature."

Rodeo is a popular topic in country-western music such as the 1991 Garth Brooks hit single "Rodeo", and has also been featured in numerous movies, television programs and in literature. Rodeo is a ballet score written by Aaron Copland in 1942, and choreographer Agnes de Mille's ballet, Rodeo was commissioned by the Ballet Russe de Monte Carlo in 1942 with the Copland score. Country singer Chris Ledoux from Mississippi and Wyoming competed in bareback riding and wrote many songs based on his experiences. Rodeo has also been featured in a significant number of films, and some focus specifically on the sport, such as My Heroes Have Always Been Cowboys, 8 Seconds, Cowboy Up, The Longest Ride, and The Rider.

== Rodeos worldwide ==
There are thousands of rodeos held worldwide each year.

== Rodeo organizations ==
- All Indian Rodeo Cowboys Association
- American Junior Rodeo Association
- Australian Professional Rodeo Association
- Bill Pickett Invitational Rodeo
- Bull Riders Only
- Bulls, Bands & Barrels
- Canadian Collegiate Rodeo Association
- Canadian Professional Rodeo Association
- Championship Bull Riding
- Confederação Nacional de Rodeio
- Cowboys Professional Rodeo Association
- Elite Rodeo Athletes
- Federación Mexicana de Rodeo
- Indian National Finals Rodeo
- International Gay Rodeo Association
- International Professional Rodeo Association
- Mid-States Rodeo Association
- National Barrel Horse Association
- National High School Rodeo Association
- National Intercollegiate Rodeo Association
- National Little Britches Rodeo Association
- National Senior Pro Rodeo Association
- New Zealand Rodeo Cowboys Association
- Professional Bull Riders
- Professional Rodeo Cowboys Association
- Pro Rodeo Costa Rica
- Southern Extreme Bull Riding Association
- United Professional Rodeo Association
- Women's Professional Rodeo Association
- Working Ranch Cowboys Association
- World Series of Team Roping

== Related sports ==
- Bullfighting
- Campdrafting
- Charrería
- Chilean rodeo
- Chuckwagon racing
- Coleo
- Cowboy mounted shooting
- Cowboy polo
- Cutting
- Deporte de lazo
- Gymkhana
- Jineteada gaucha
- Ranch rodeo
- Ranch sorting
- Reining
- Team penning
- Vaquejada
- Western dressage
- Western pleasure
- Working cow horse

== See also ==
- Buckle bunny – Rodeo rider groupie
- Western riding – Style of horseback riding which evolved from the ranching and warfare traditions

== Sources ==
- Allen, Michael (1998). Rodeo Cowboys in the North American Imagination. Reno, Nevada: University of Nevada Press. ISBN 9780874173154.
- Armstrong, Susan Jean; Botzler, Richard George (2003). The Animal Ethics Reader. London: Routledge. ISBN 9780415275880. Archived from the original on 2016-06-24.
- Broyles, Janell (2006). Barrel Racing. New York City: The Rosen Publishing Group. p. 4. ISBN 9781404205437. Archived from the original on 2016-05-04.
- Candelaria, Cordelia; García, Peter J.; Aldama, Arturo J. (2004). Encyclopedia of Latino Popular Culture. Westport, CT: Greenwood Publishing Group. ISBN 9780313332104. Archived from the original on 2016-06-10.
- Chisholm, Alec H., ed. (1963). "Bushmen's Carnivals". The Australian Encyclopaedia. Vol. 2. Sydney: Halstead Press. p. 213.
- Curnutt, Jordan (2001). Animals and the Law: A Sourcebook. Santa Barbara, California: ABC-CLIO. ISBN 9781576071472. Archived from the original on 2017-01-16.
- Evans, James Warren (2001). Horses: A Guide to Selection, Care, and Enjoyment. New York City: W. H. Freeman and Company. p. 476. ISBN 9780716742555.
- Groves, Melody (2006). Ropes, Reins, and Rawhide: All About Rodeo. Albuquerque, New Mexico: University of New Mexico Press. ISBN 9780826338228. Archived from the original on 2016-06-29.
- Kirsch, George B.; Harris, Othello; Elaine Nolte, Claire (2000). Rodeo. Westport, CT: Greenwood Publishing Group. p. 390. ISBN 9780313299117. Archived from the original on 2021-09-28.
- Harris, Moira C. (2007). Rodeo and Western Riding. Edison, NJ: Chartwell Books. ISBN 9780785822011. Archived from the original on 2016-04-27.
- Lawrence, Elizabeth Atwood (1984). Rodeo: An Anthropologist Looks at the Wild and the Tame. Chicago: University of Chicago Press. ISBN 9780226469553.
- Martin, Desmond (1959). Australia Astride. Sydney: Angus and Robertson. OCLC 155832392.
- Miller, Robert M.; Lamb, Richard A. (2005). Revolution in Horsemanship. Vol. 216. Guilford, CT: Lyons Press. pp. 1232–3. ISBN 9781592283873. PMID 10767957.
- Shaw, John Henry (1984). Roughriding. Sydney: William Collins. ISBN 9780002173155.
- Slatta, Richard W. (1994). Cowboys of the Americas. New Haven, CT: Yale University Press. ISBN 9780300056716. Archived from the original on 2016-05-03.
- Strickland, Charlene (1998). Competing in Western Shows & Events. Pownal, VT: Storey Books. ISBN 9781580170314.
- Westermeier, Clifford P. (1947). Man, Beast, Dust: The Story of Rodeo. Lincoln, Nebraska: University of Nebraska Press. ISBN 9780803247437. Archived from the original on 2016-06-10.
- "Animals Used for Entertainment: Rodeo". People for the Ethical Treatment of Animals. Archived from the original on 2013-12-07.
- "Liberal Leader Kevin Taft loses legacy bid to have rodeo declared Alberta's official sport". Get Growing for Business.
- "Rodeo: Animal Abuse for the Sake of Entertainment". Vancouver Humane Society. Archived from the original on 2017-07-22.
- "Welfare of animals are integral part of professional rodeos". Journal of American Veterinary Medical Association. American Veterinary Medical Association. 15 January 2001. Archived from the original on 12 November 2018.
