= Working Ranch Cowboys Association =

Professional association for ranch owners

NIRA logo

The Working Ranch Cowboys Association (WRCA) was established in 1995 in Amarillo, Texas, United States, as a professional association for ranch owners, foremen, and cowboys. One of their stated goals was to keep the western heritage, ideals, and work ethics alive.

The WRCA sanctions several ranch rodeos every year plus the World Championship Ranch Rodeo held every November in Amarillo. The WRCA rodeo events cater more to actual ranch work than do regular rodeos. The events include ranch bronc riding, team doctoring, wild cow milking, team branding, and team penning.

The WRCA Foundation, sponsored by the WRCA, provides assistance to cowboys and their families in times of serious needs and also provides a financial collegiate scholarship every year.
