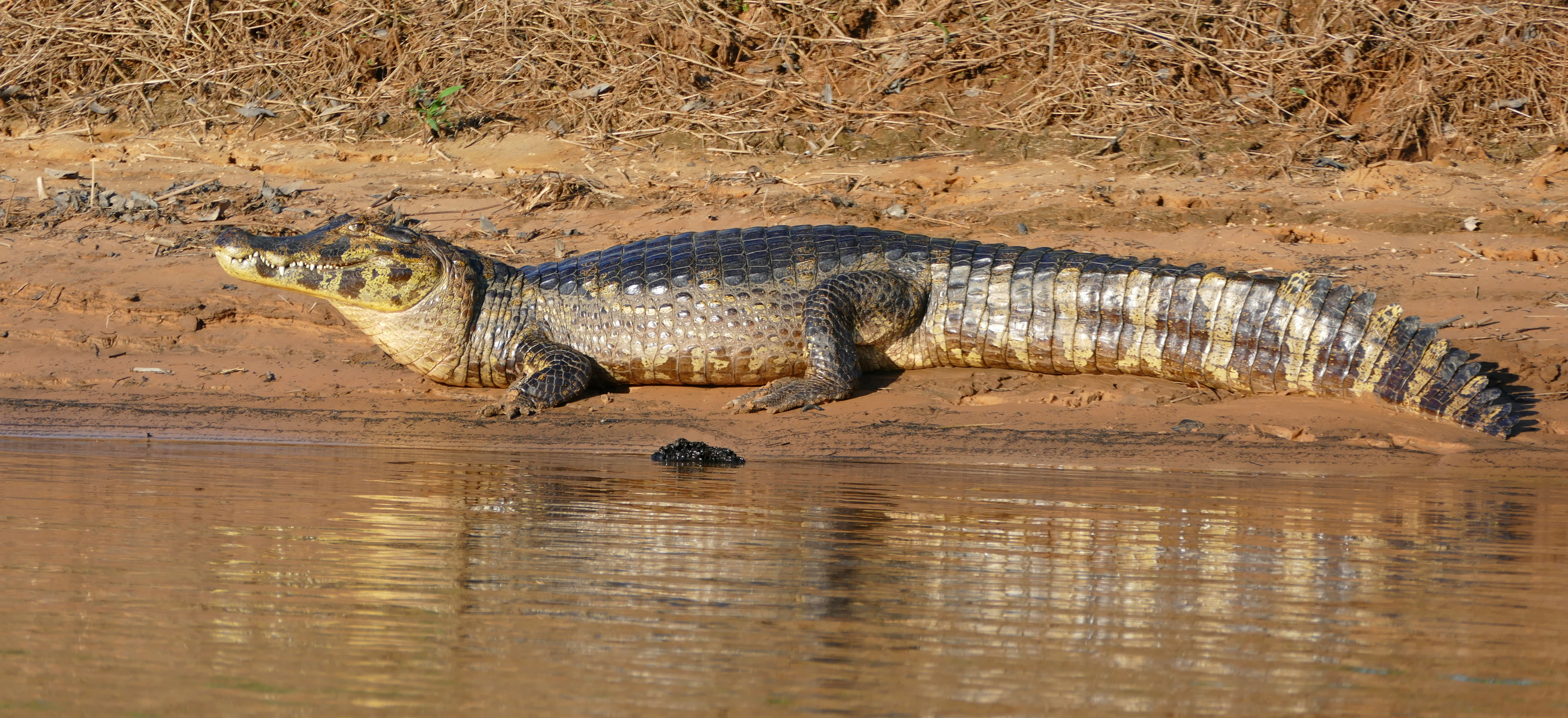
- Mato Grosso, Brazil

Conservation status
- Least Concern (IUCN 3.1)
- CITES Appendix II

Scientific classification
- Kingdom: Animalia
- Phylum: Chordata
- Class: Reptilia
- Clade: Archosauria
- Order: Crocodilia
- Family: Alligatoridae
- Subfamily: Caimaninae
- Clade: Jacarea
- Genus: Caiman
- Species: C. yacare

Binomial name
- Caiman yacare Daudin, 1802
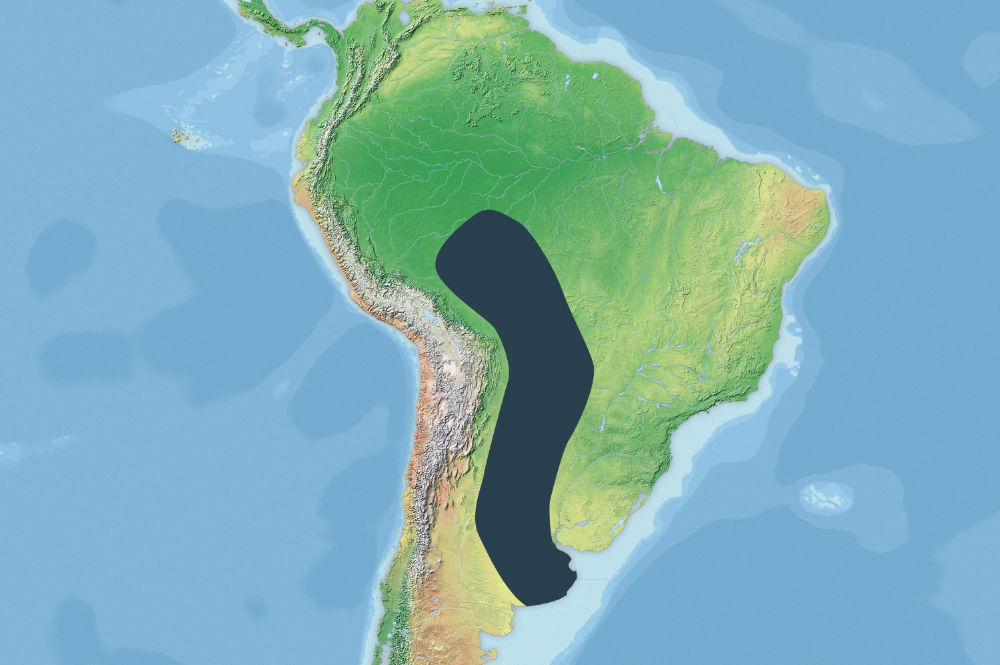
- Range (black)

Synonyms
- List: Crocodilus yacare Daudin, 1802; Caiman yacare — Schmidt, 1928; Jacaretinga crocodilus yacare — F. Werner, 1933; Caiman crocodilus yacare — L. Müller & Hellmich, 1936; Caiman yacare — Cei, 1993

= Yacare caiman =

Yacare caiman Temporal range: Late Miocene – Present, 11.6–0 Ma

Species of reptile

The yacare caiman (Caiman yacare), also known commonly as the jacare caiman, Paraguayan caiman, piranha caiman, red caiman, and southern spectacled caiman, is a species of caiman, a crocodilian in the family Alligatoridae. The species is indigenous to Argentina, Bolivia, Brazil, and Paraguay. Brown in color and covered with dark blotches, males grow to a total length (including tail) of 2–3 m (6 ft 7 in – 9 ft 10 in) and weigh around 40–50 kg (88–110 lb); while females grow to 1.4 m (4 ft 7 in) long and about 15–20 kg (33–44 lb). Typical habitats of this caiman include lakes, rivers, and wetlands. Its diet primarily consists of aquatic animals, such as snails, and occasionally land vertebrates. Mating occurs in the rainy season and eggs hatch in March, with young fending for themselves as soon as they hatch. The yacare caiman was hunted heavily for its skin to use for leather in the 1980s, which caused its population to decrease significantly. However, trading restrictions placed since have caused its population to increase. Its population in the Pantanal is about 10 million, and it is listed as least concern on the IUCN Red List.

== Etymology ==
Its specific name, “yacare” (also written “jacare”) entered English primarily through Portuguese, which had adopted the indigenous Tupi-Guarani term jakare to refer to certain caimans and similar reptiles from South America. The adoption of this word into Portuguese (jacaré) and Spanish (yacaré) is due to contact between the Guarani people and the conquistadors during the colonial period and subsequent centuries of linguistic coexistence.

== Taxonomy ==
François Marie Daudin originally described the yacare caiman in 1802 as Crocodilus yacare.

The yacare caiman is one of three extant (living) species of the genus Caiman, the other two being the Spectacled caiman (Caiman crocodilus) and the Broad-snouted caiman (Caiman latirostris). There are also several extinct fossil species in the genus Caiman, possibly up to eight species. The yacare caiman is a member of the caiman subfamily Caimaninae, and is one of six living species of caiman.

As of 2010, the exact relationship between the yacare caiman and related species is unclear and complicated. There have been attempts to analyze this relationship, but these have not produced definite conclusions. It is sometimes considered a subspecies of the spectacled caiman (Caiman crocodilus), which would make its scientific name Caiman crocodilus yacare. These two species are the same morphologically, but are considered separate species due to their geographical differences. Its relationship to the spectacled caiman and the other extant caimans can be shown in the cladogram below, based on molecular DNA-based phylogenetic studies:

- Alligatoridae
  - Caimaninae
    - - Paleosuchus palpebrosus Cuvier's dwarf caiman
      - Paleosuchus trigonatus Schneider's dwarf caiman
    - Jacarea
      - - - Caiman crocodilus Spectacled caiman
          - Caiman yacare Yacare caiman
        - Caiman latirostris Broad-snouted caiman
      - Melanosuchus niger Black caiman
  - Alligatorinae
    - Alligator sinensis Chinese alligator
    - Alligator mississippiensis American alligator

== Distribution ==
The range of the yacare caiman includes Argentina (north), Bolivia, Brazil (south), and Paraguay. It is one of three species of genus Caiman in South America, the others being the broad-snouted caiman (C. latirostris) and the spectacled caiman (C. crocodilus), with more easterly and northerly ranges, respectively. The yacare caiman is one of the most common species of caiman on its continent.

== Description ==
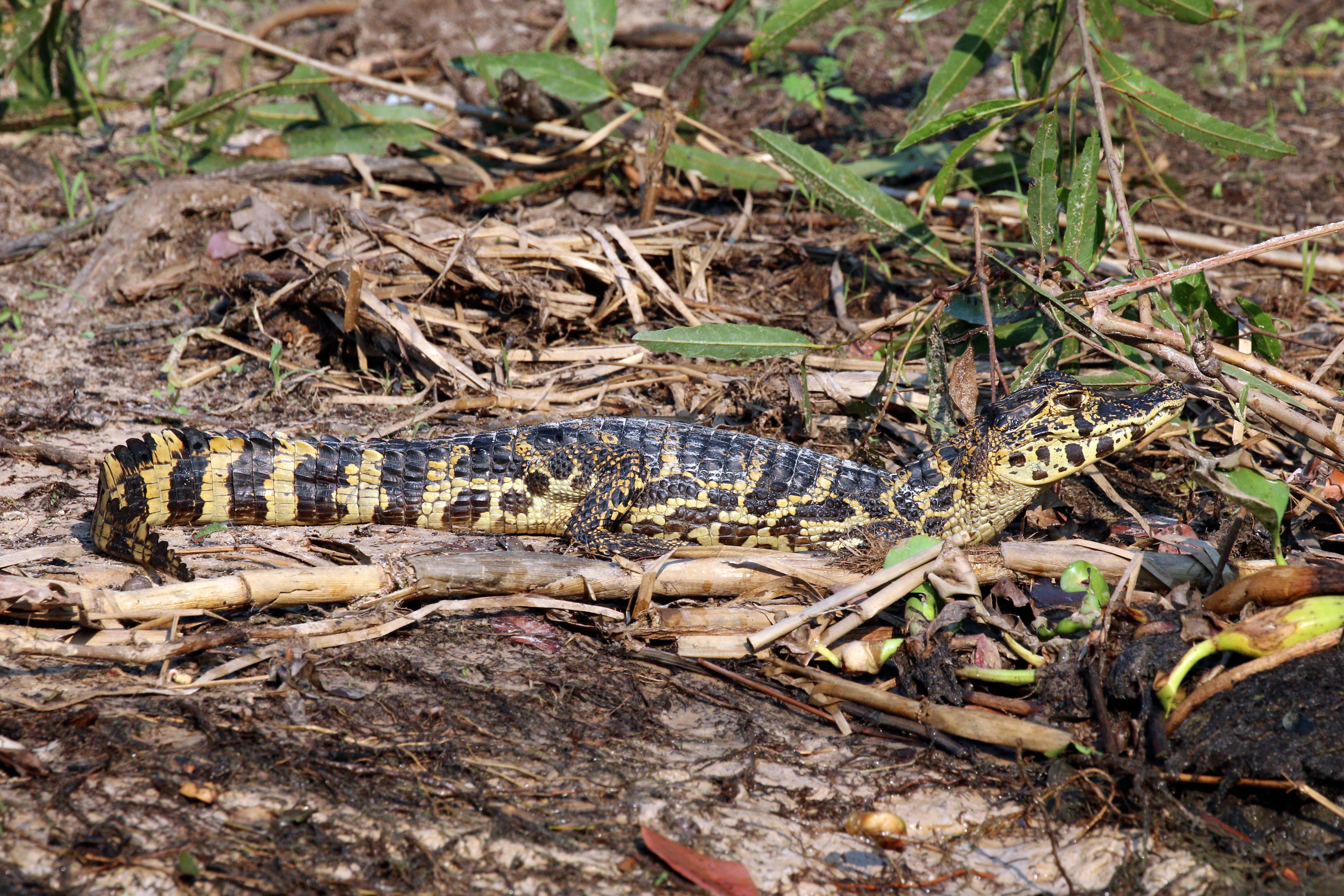
1 month old juvenile

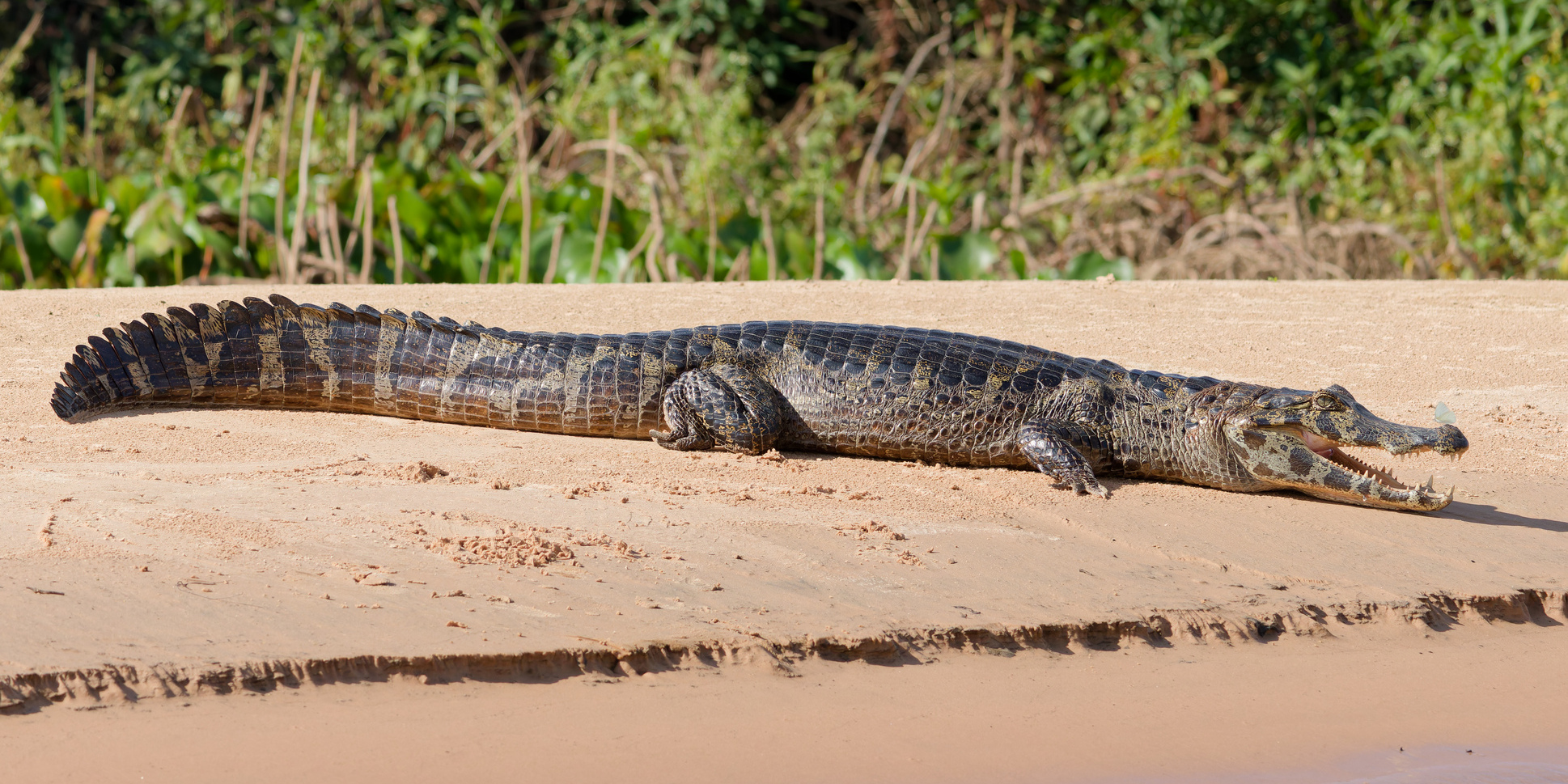
Adult

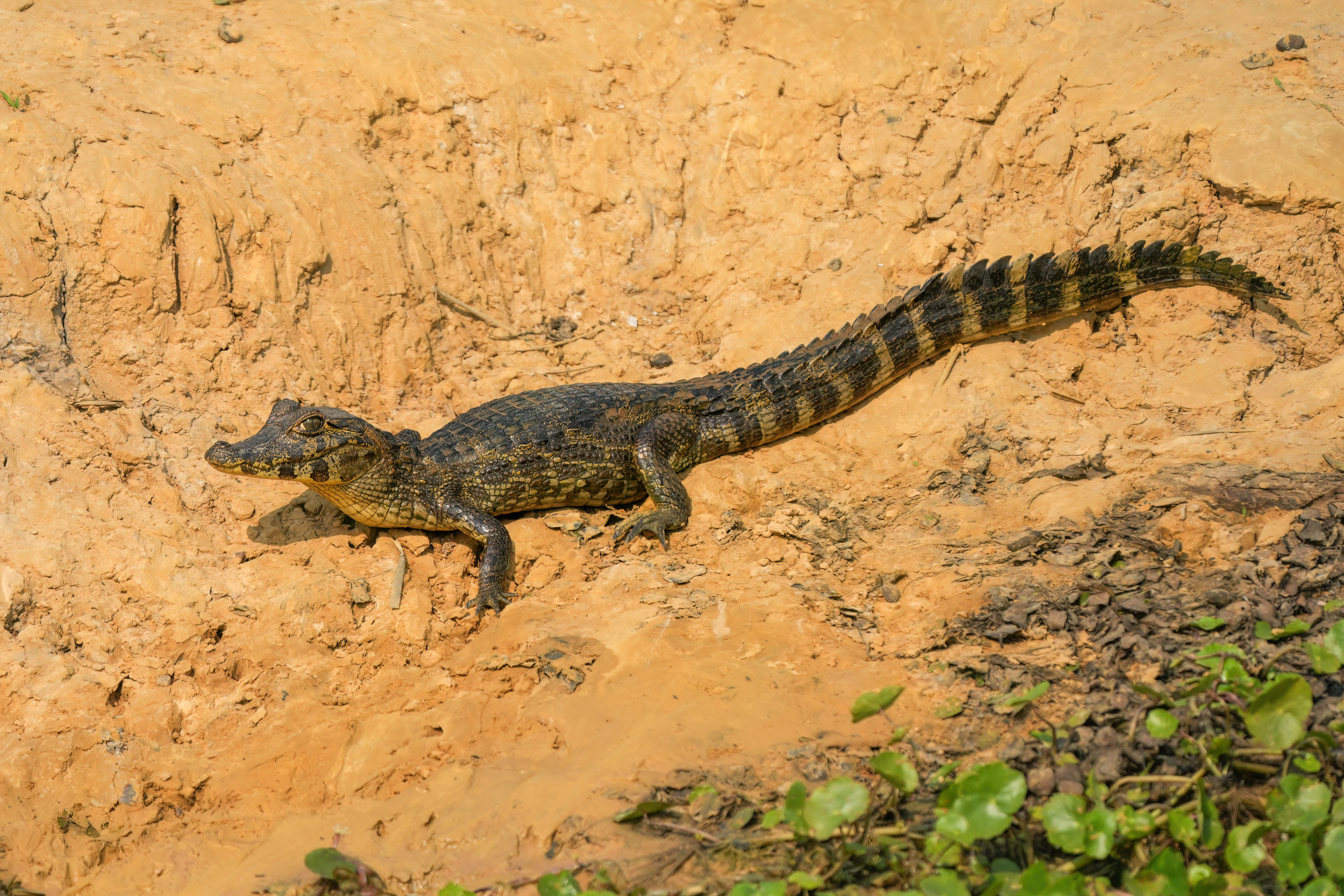
Juvenile

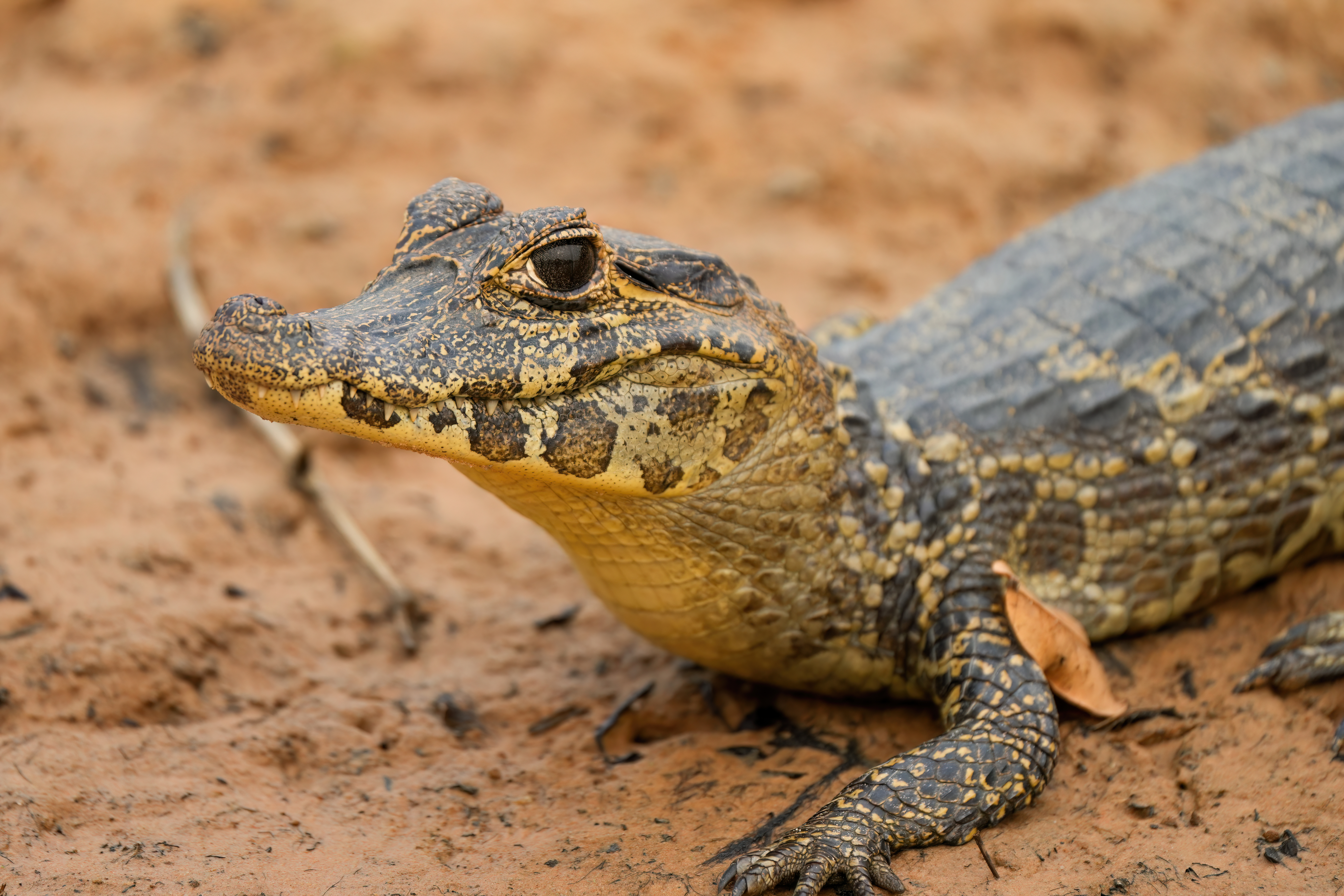
Juvenile head close-up

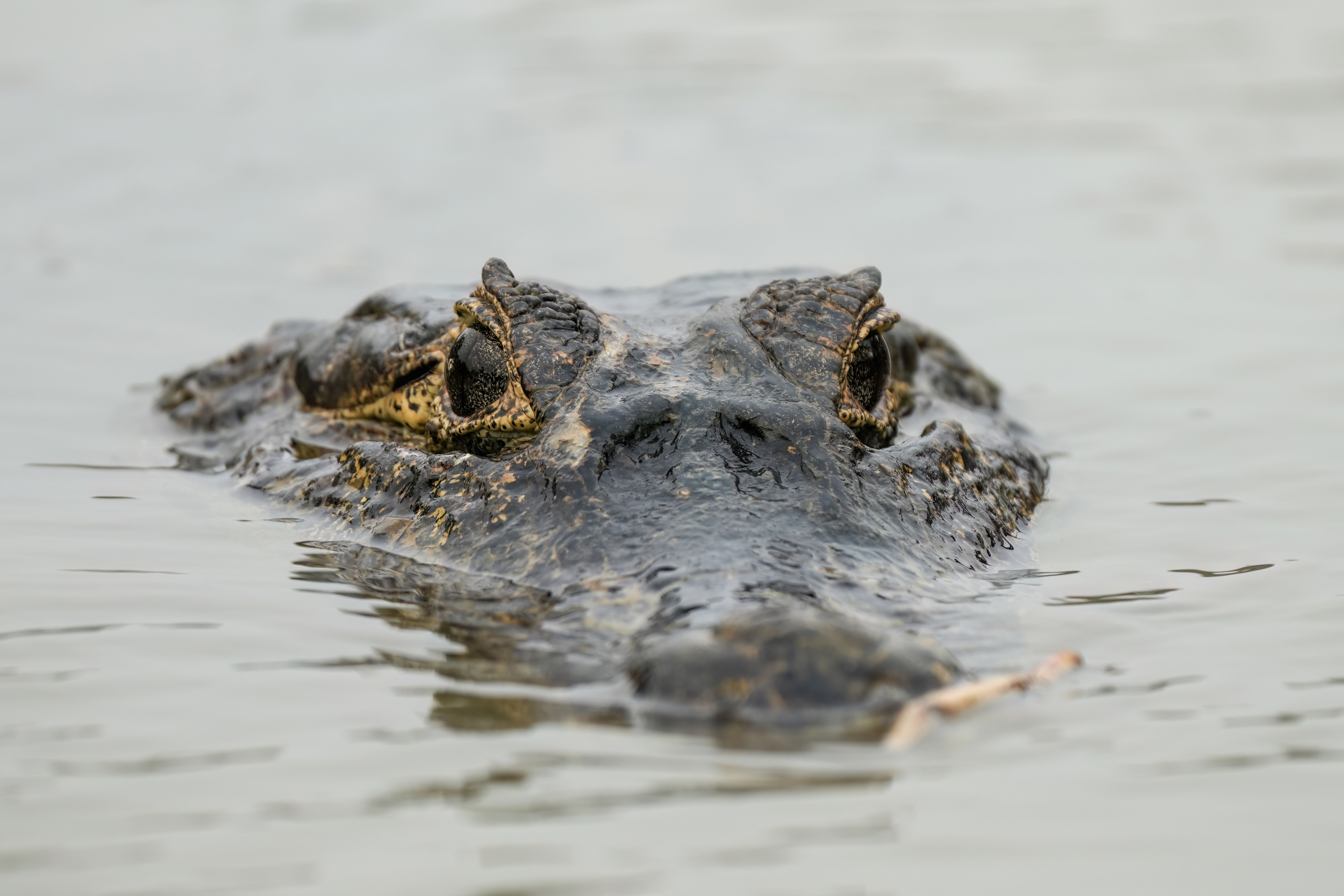
Swimming in the Pantanal, Brazil

C. yacare is a medium-sized caiman, brown in color. Male specimens grow to 2–3 m (6 ft 7 in – 9 ft 10 in) in total length (including tail) and up to 58 kg (128 lb) in weight. Females are much smaller, with an adult total length of 1.4 m (4 ft 7 in) and weight of 14–23 kg (31–51 lb). The average snout–vent length (SVL) of hatchlings is 12.49 cm (4.92 in) for females and 12.84 cm (5.06 in) for males. Based on a study of the growth of multiple specimens in the Pantanal from 1987 to 2013, both sexes are about 50 cm (20 in) SVL at age five. By age 15, they have mostly finished growth, with females being about 80 cm (31 in) SVL and males over 100 cm (39 in) SVL. The study also showed that individuals have significant variation in their growth rates.

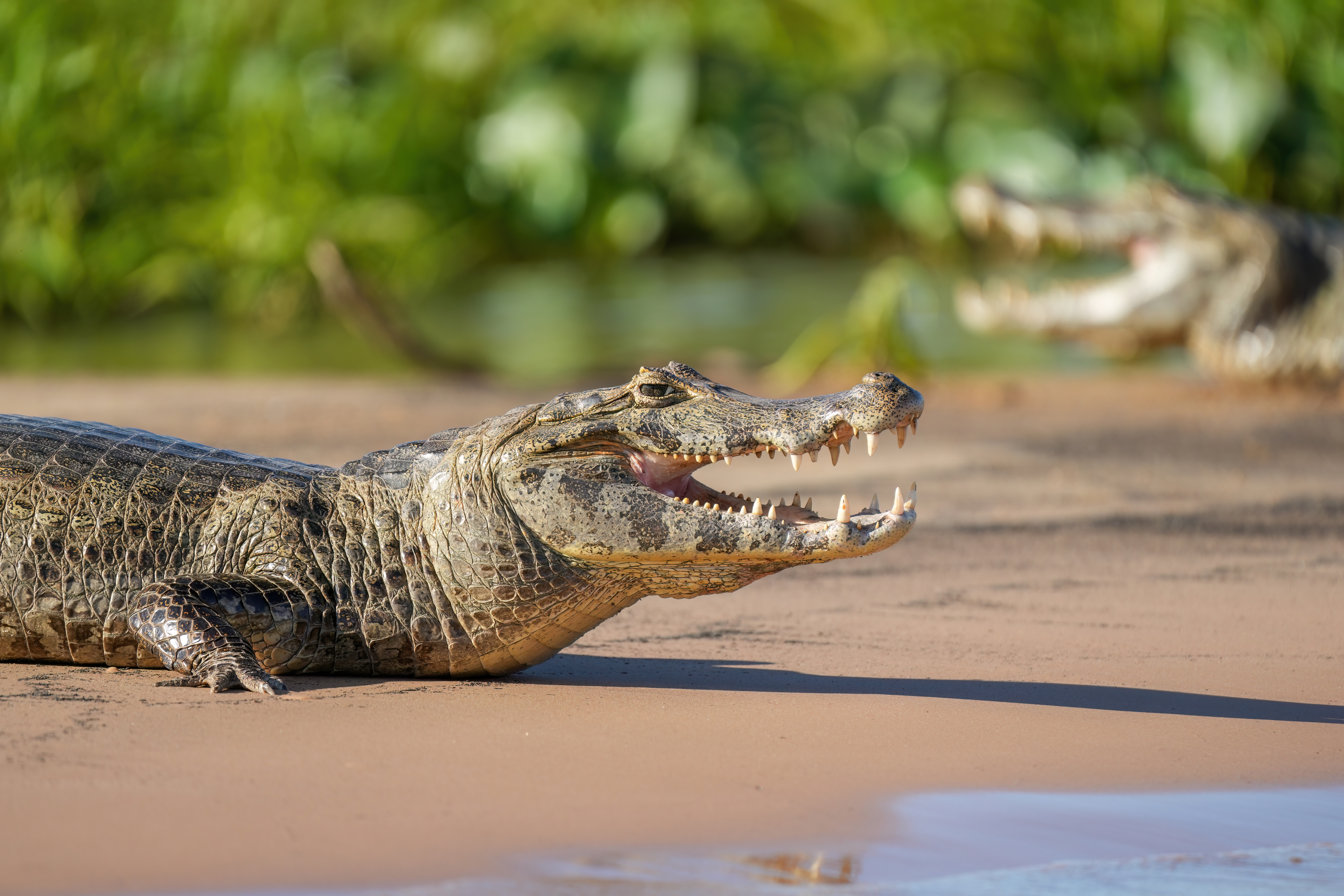
Closeup, showing dark blotches on the jaw

Dark marks are distributed across the body; most noticeably, its lower jaw is covered with three to five blotches. It has a smooth snout, which is medium in length and broad. It has lumps on its eyelids and a curved ridge between its eyes. It has osteoderms on its scales, a feature also present in the spectacled caiman. It has an average of 74 teeth, with 5 pre-maxillary, 14–15 maxillary, and 17–21 mandibular. Some of the teeth on its lower jaw can poke through holes in its upper jaw. This feature makes its teeth more prominent and has been compared to piranhas, which has established the common name "piranha caiman".

== Ecology ==
The yacare caiman is ecologically similar to the spectacled caiman. It lives in semi-aquatic habitats, including lakes, rivers, and wetlands, but is able to adapt to a variety of habitats. Individuals sometimes move to different locations in groups if their habitat is disturbed. The species' diet consists of aquatic animals, such as snails and fish, and occasionally snakes. It has also been known to eat capybaras. When hunting for snails, this caiman looks within vegetation floating in water and uses its jaws to break the shells of the snails. In July 1986, the stomach of a specimen in Bolivia was observed to be full of mud, along with small parts of eggshells that likely belonged to a caiman. In general, crocodilians can eat the eggshells of their own young subsequent to the young hatching.

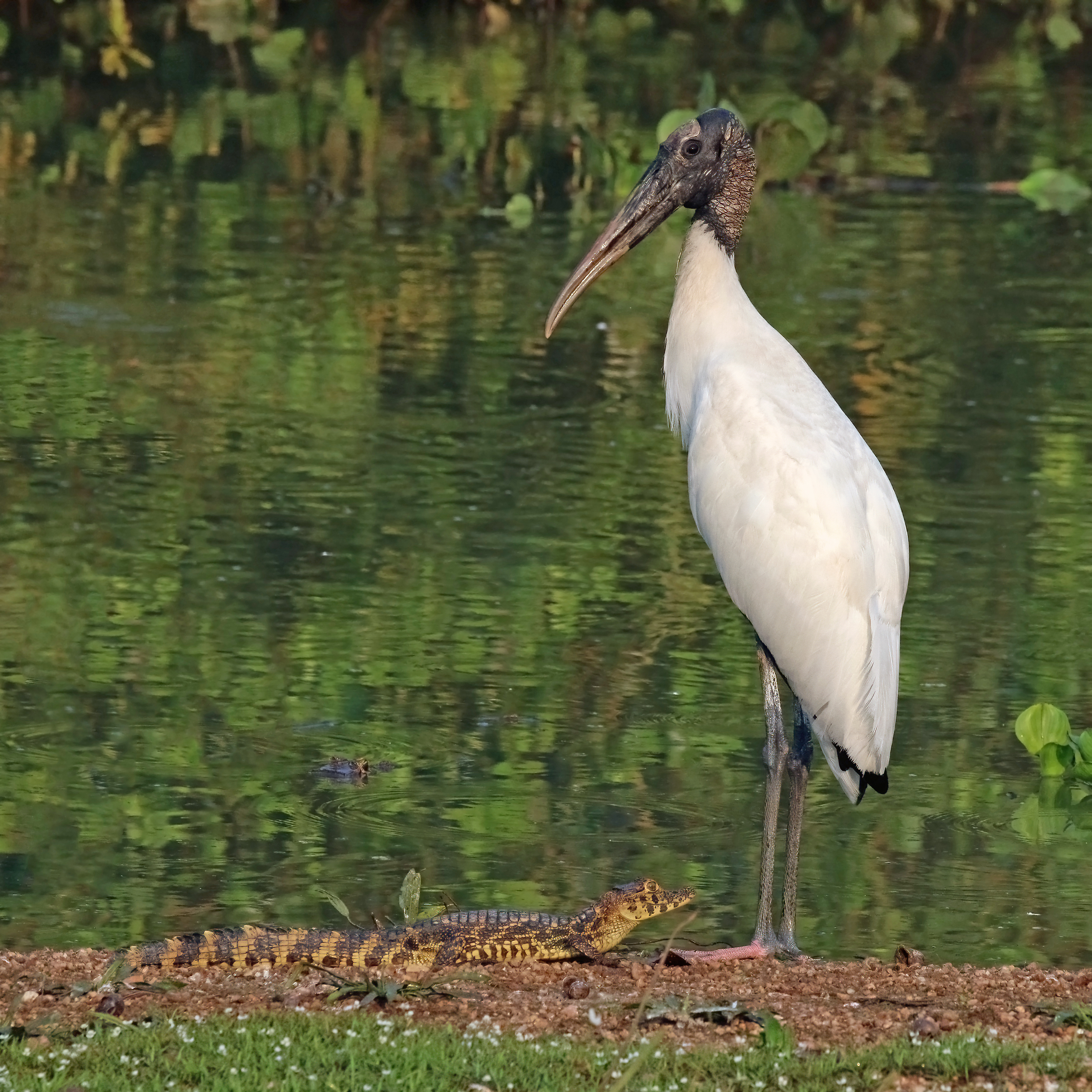
Storks, such as this wood stork (right), can prey on juveniles (left).

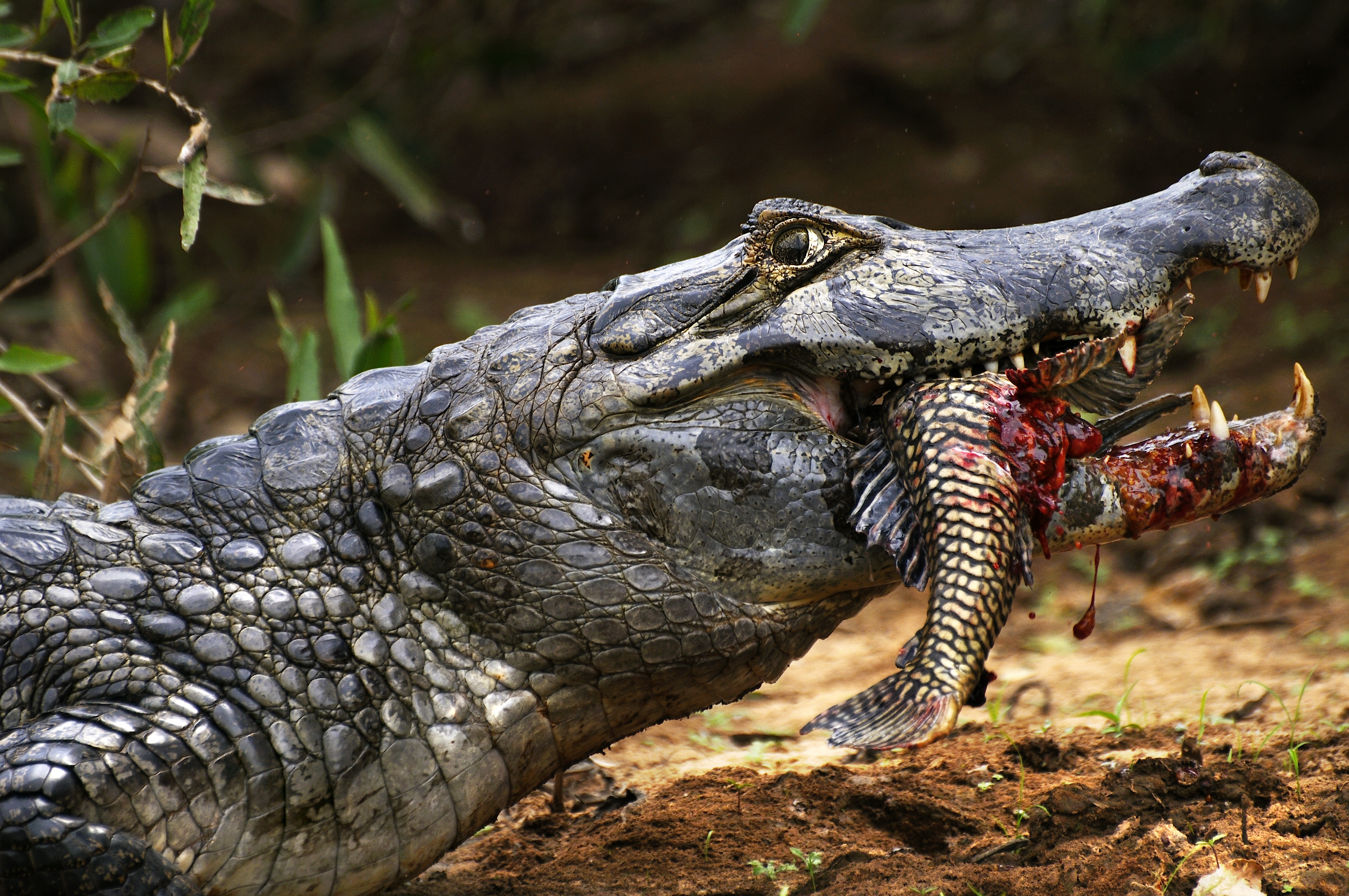
Feeding on a pleco

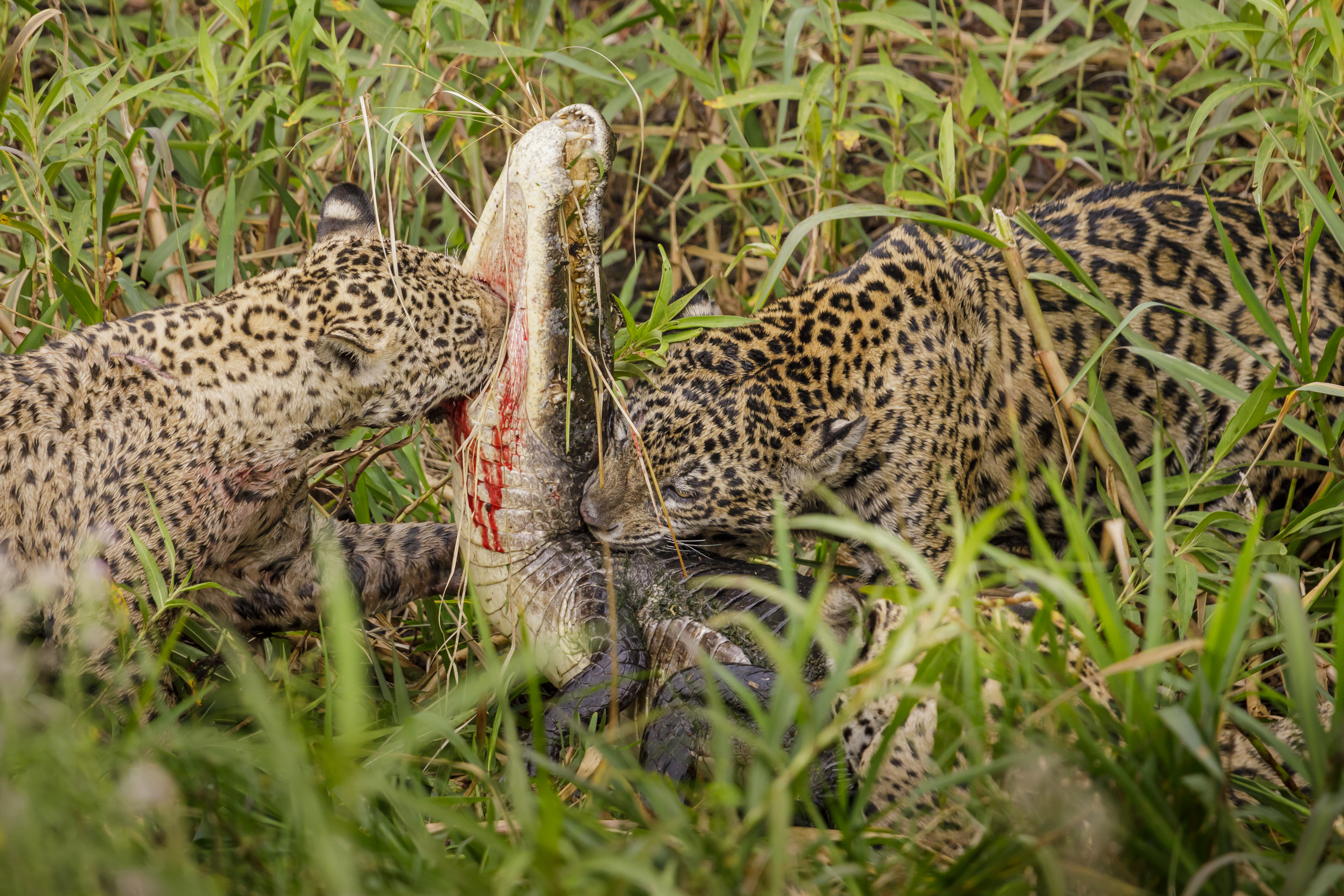
Jaguars occasionally prey on caiman.

== Reproduction and lifecycle ==
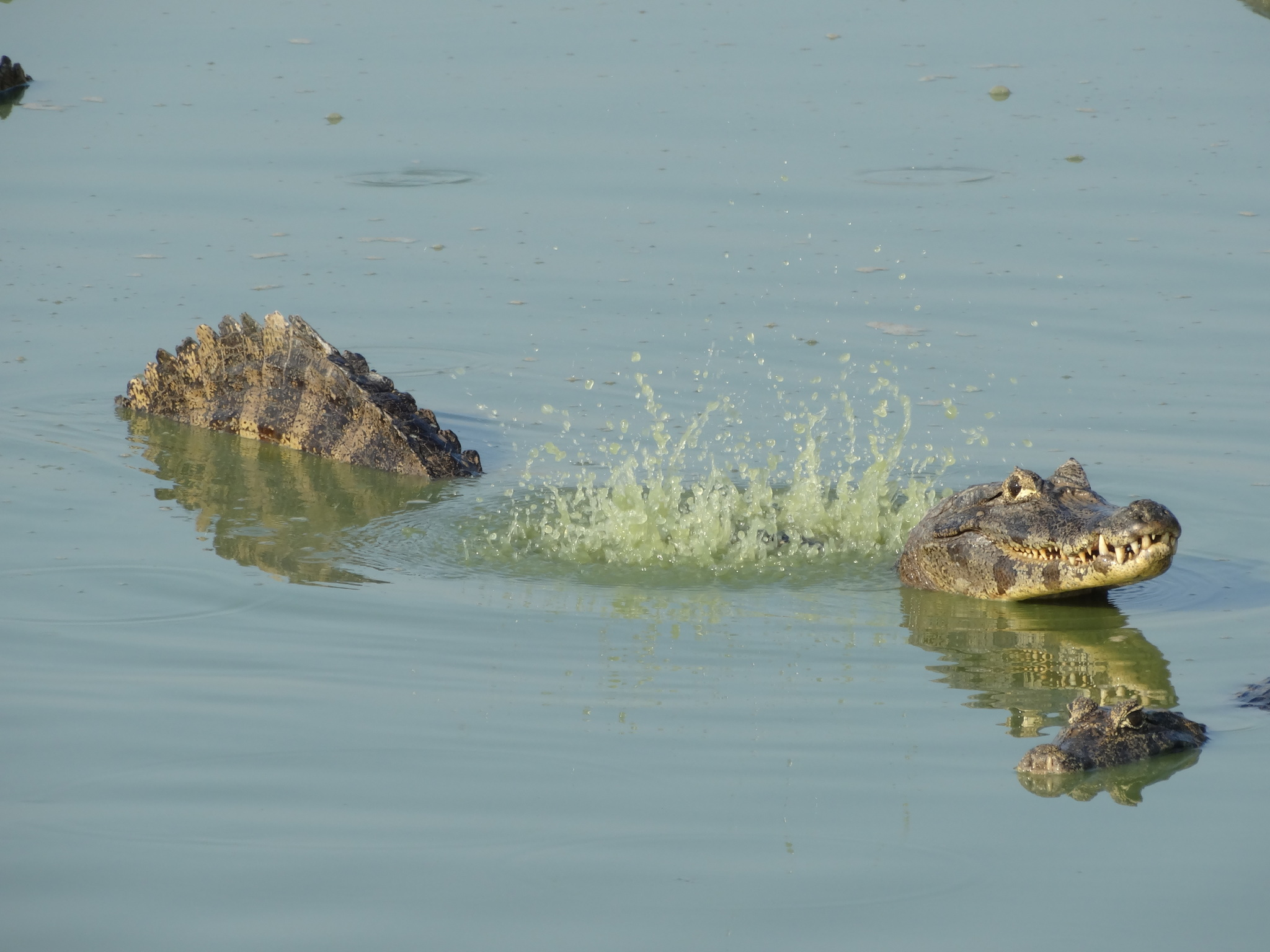
Yacare caiman bellowing

Breeding usually occurs in December–February, in the middle of the rainy season. Nests are constructed by the females, built in a mound shape using mud and rotting vegetation. The species can lay as many as 44 eggs, but it most commonly lays 22–35, with the exact number often depending on the habitat type. It often exhibits multiple paternity, more so than several other crocodilian species. Females usually protect nests during incubation, but do so less when the human hunting pressure is high, ultimately causing a lower hatching success rate. Eggs hatch in March. Young exhibit precociality, receiving very little help from their parents and having to care for themselves. They hide in grasses in the daytime, as herons and storks can eat young caimans. Females become sexually mature at age 10–15.

Similar species of the yacare caiman live to about age 50, which has been used as an estimate for this caiman's lifespan, but its exact lifespan is unknown.

== Conservation ==
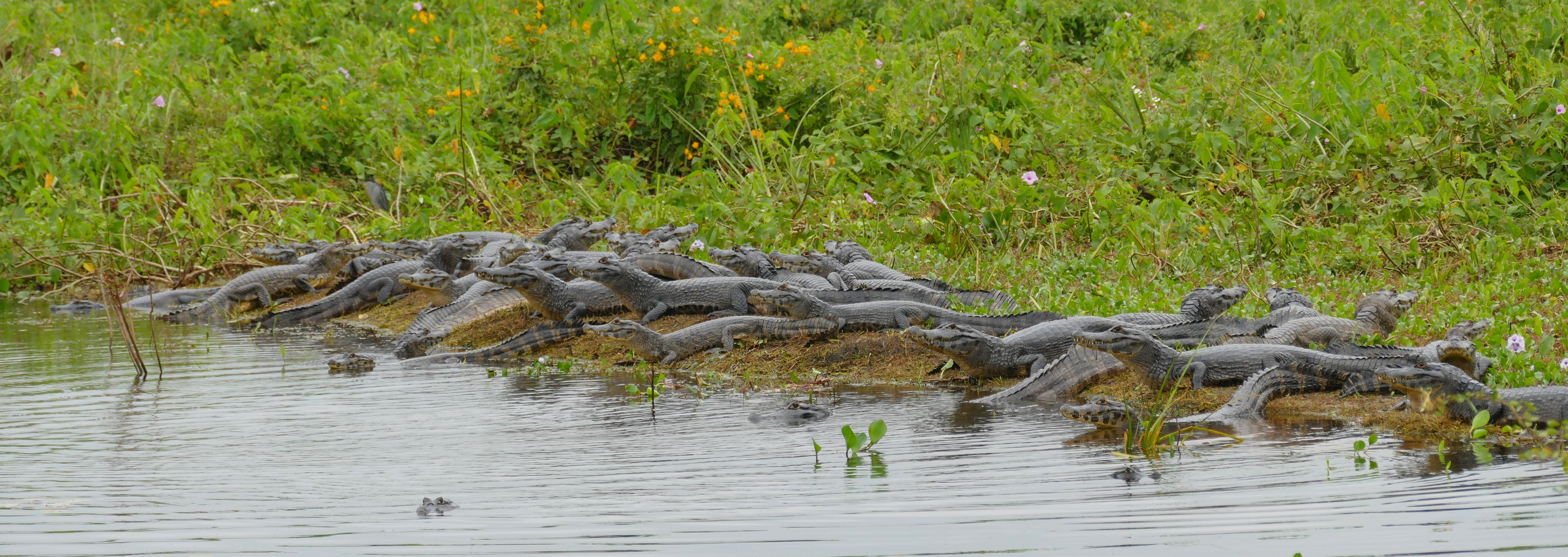
Group of yacare caiman in Mato Grosso, Brazil

The IUCN Red List designated the yacare caiman a species of least concern in 1996. It is listed as threatened by the United States Fish and Wildlife Service as of June 5, 2000, after having been listed as endangered since June 2, 1970. As of 2010, it is listed as an Appendix II species by the Convention on International Trade in Endangered Species of Wild Fauna and Flora.

=== Threats ===
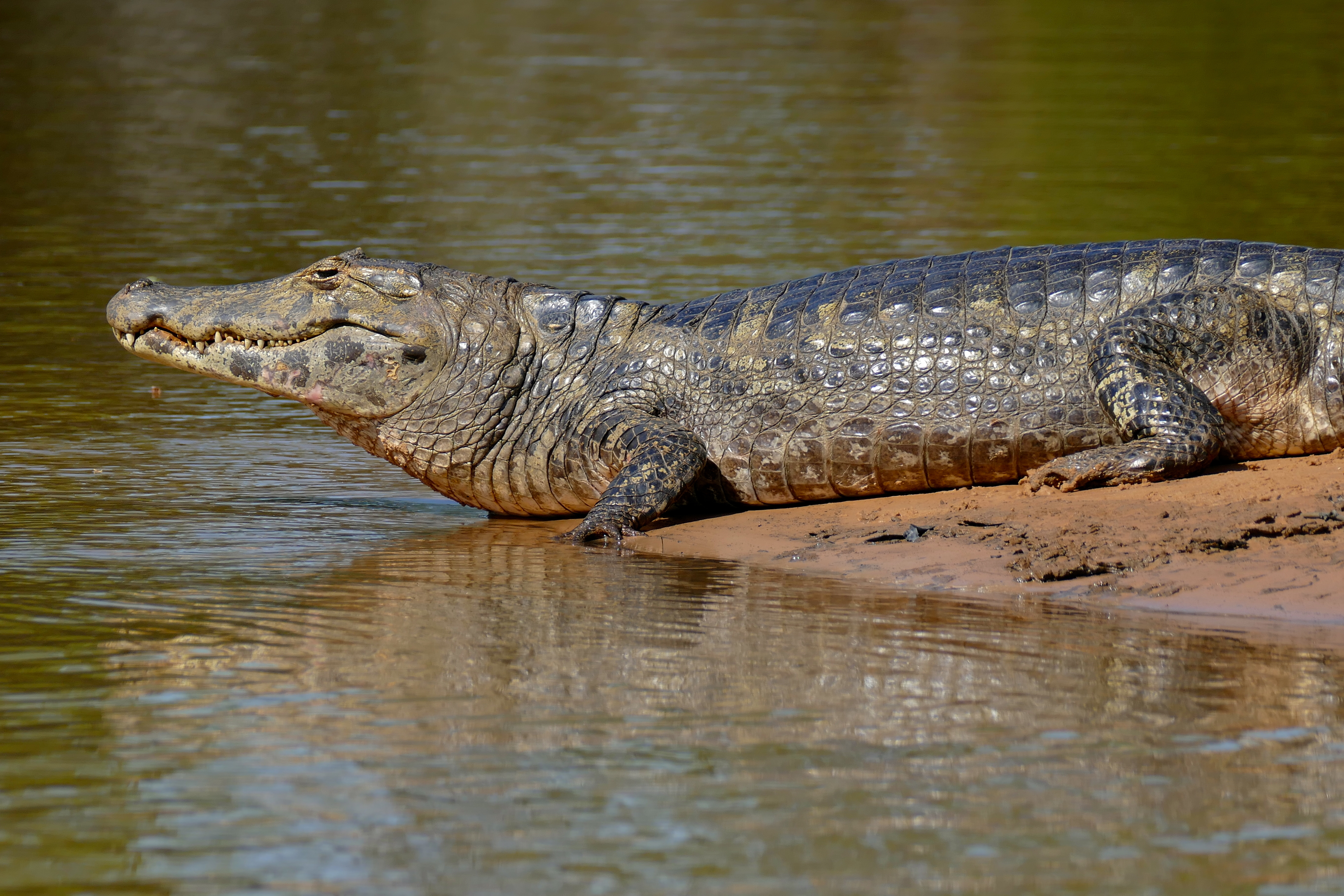
Large adult basking, in Mato Grosso

In the 1980s, the species was "heading for oblivion" due to frequently being hunted for its skin; hunters often went to water holes containing many yacare caimans and shot large numbers of them. They utilized the skin for leather and left the other parts of the carcasses at the water holes. Although the species is covered with bony osteoderms, which had previously made it uncommon to be hunted for leather, it has some less bony spots which can be used for leather. This practice caused the caiman's population to drop by the millions. In 1992, a ban was issued in Brazil that prohibited the trading of crocodilian skins. This resulted in a significant increase in its population, with about 10 million specimens living in the Pantanal alone as of 2013.

Current threats of the yacare caiman include deforestation, tourism, construction of dams and seaports, and illegal hunting. The species reproduces quickly, which makes it less susceptible to hunting pressure.
