= Tropicario =

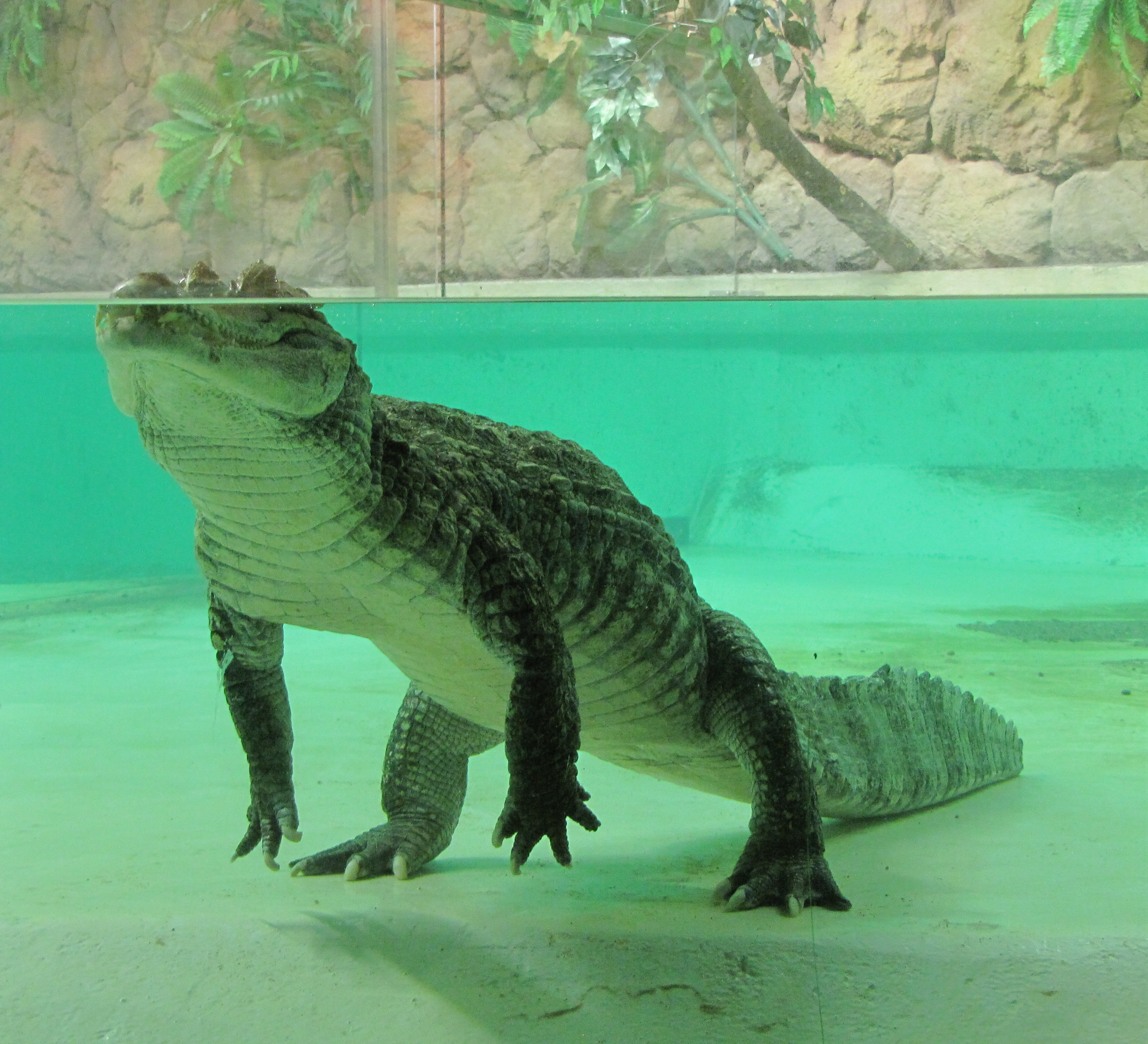
- Spectacled Caiman (Caiman crocodilus), Helsinki Tropicario Zoo
- Interactive map of Tropicario
- 60°11′38″N 24°57′21″E
- Location: Sturenkatu 27, Helsinki, Finland
- Website: www.tropicario.com/eng_index.html

Tropicario is a Finnish public aquarium and herpetarium, that was previously located in Hämeenlinna, Finland; due to the lack of visitors the park relocated to Helsinki, Finland in February 2007. The public aquarium is specialized in snakes and lizards. On their website, they claim to have more Constrictor species than anywhere else in the Nordic countries.
