= Cowboy culture =

Subculture on the American cowboy

Cowboy culture is the set of behaviors, preferences, and appearances associated with (or resulting from the influence of) the attitudes, ethics, and history of the American cowboy. The term can describe the content or stylistic appearance of an artistic representation, often built on romanticized impressions of the wild west, or certain aspects of people's lifestyle, such as their choices in recreation (including enjoyment of Western movies and music), apparel, and western or southwestern cuisine.

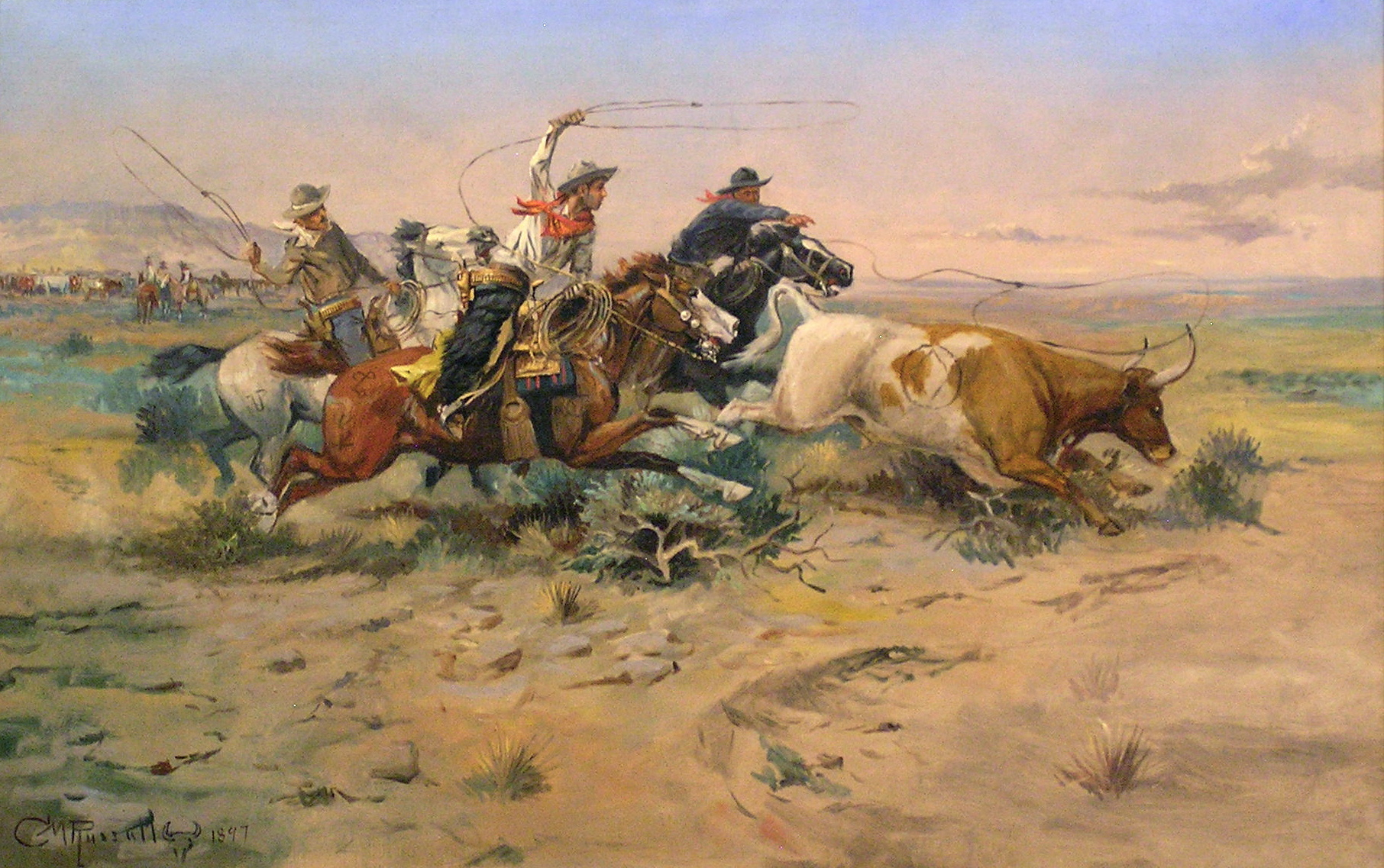
A portrayal of one popular aspect of cowboy culture in The Herd Quitter by C. M. Russell

== Origins ==
The origins of cowboy culture go back to the Spanish vaqueros who settled in Santa Fe de Nuevo México and Spanish Texas, bringing cattle. By the late 1800s, one in three cowboys were Mexican, and brought to the lifestyle its iconic symbols of hats, bandanas, spurs, stirrups, lariat, and lasso. With westward movement brought many distinct ethnicities all with their own cultural traditions. Welsh Americans, as one example, had a history in Wales of cattle and sheep droving, that incorporated well into ranch work.

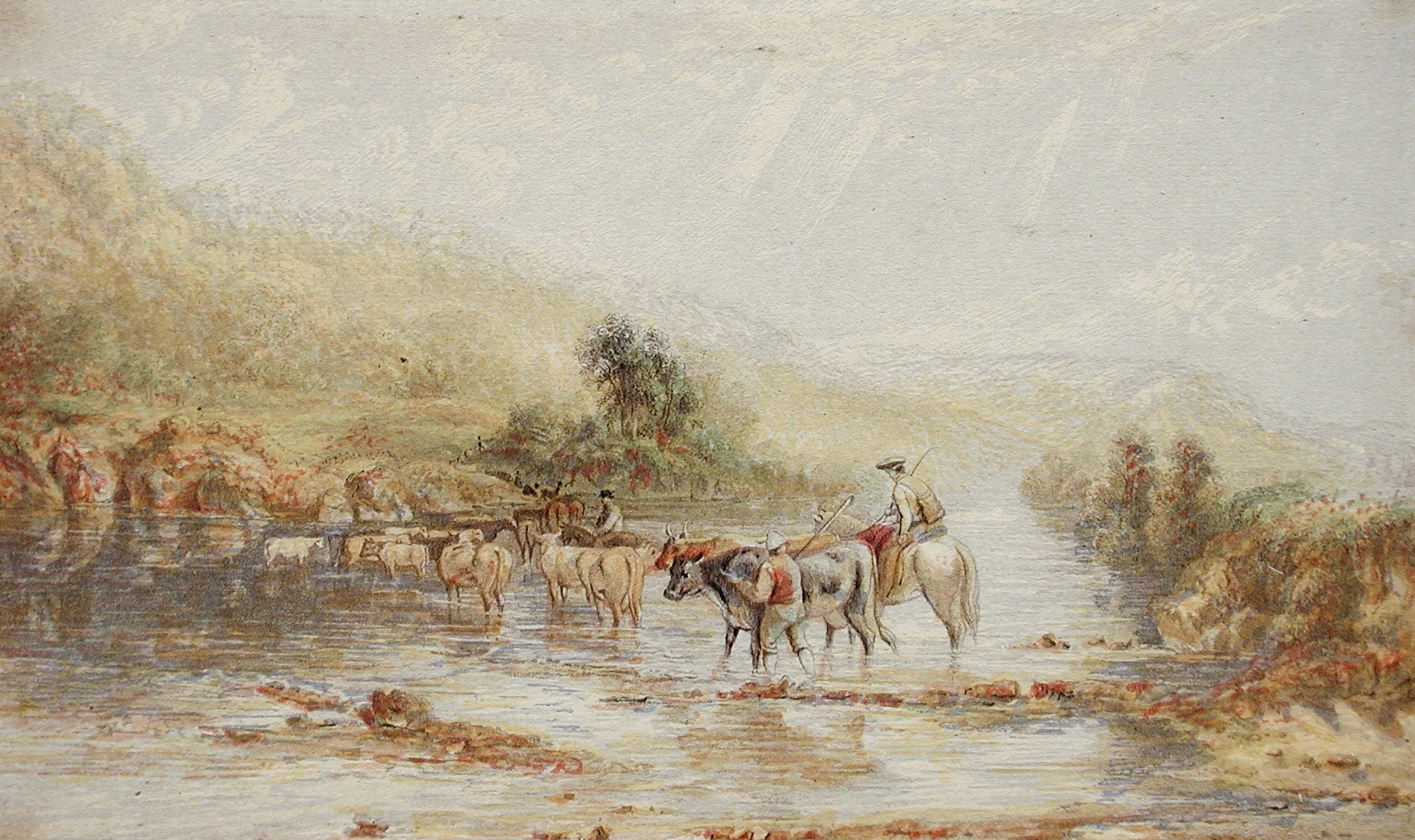
Welsh Drovers

== Mythologizing ==
In the late 19th century, folk tales about cowboys and attempts to commercialize on cowboy life by selling exaggerated ideas of it in novels and fashion became popular.

== Dime novels ==
Beginning in the 1860s, dime novels began sharing erroneous and highly romanticized tales of the West, feeding the public's interest in the trade and life West of the Mississippi.

== Radio, film and television ==
Throughout the 20th century, radio, film and television had a profound effect on the fashion and mannerisms that built the foundation of what it meant to be living a western lifestyle, however most of this was more Hollywood glitz and glamour than historical narrative.

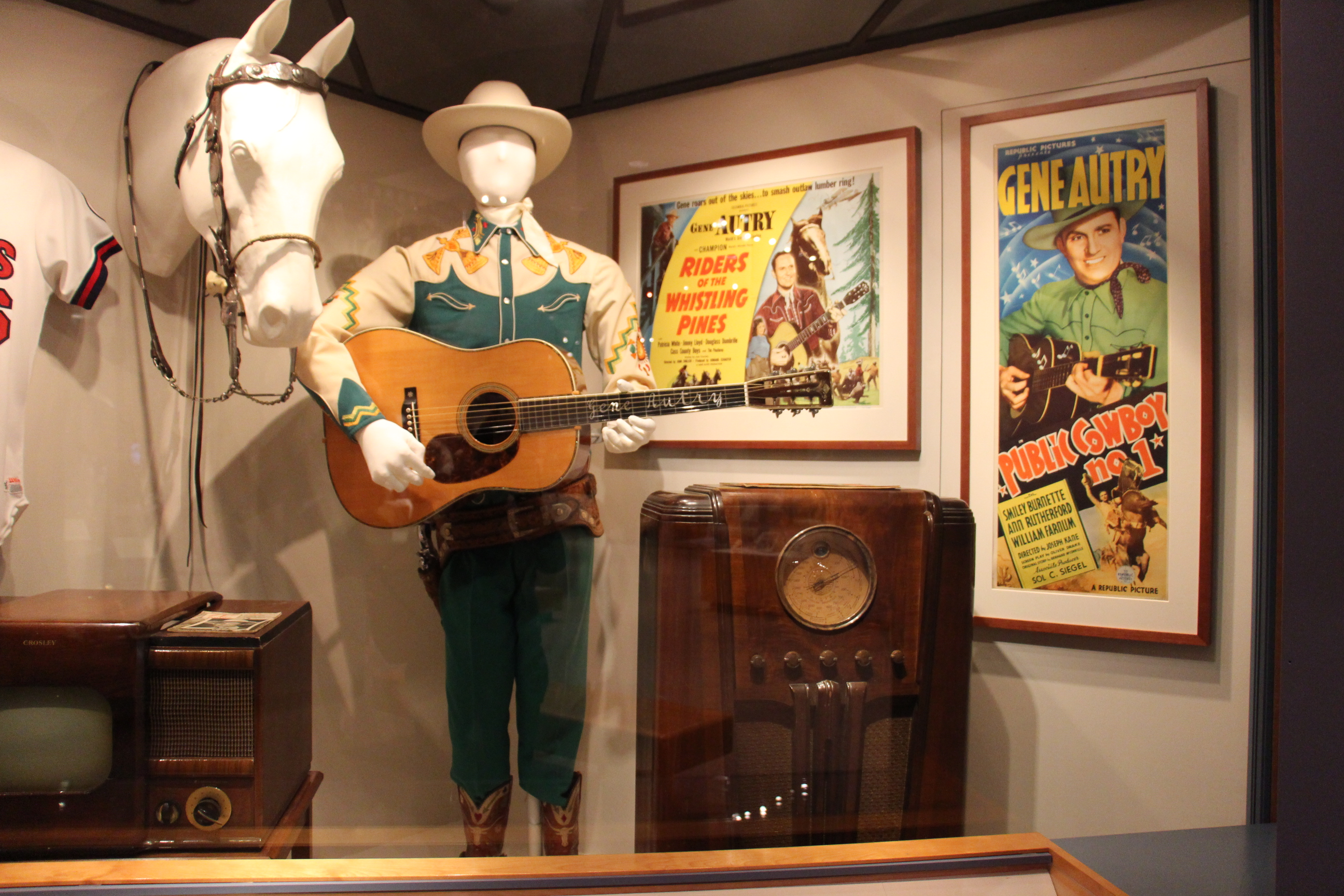
Display of Gene Autry memorabilia

== Revival ==
In the 1980s, following the urbanization of much of the Texas population, there was a marked revival of cowboy culture with the creation of a number of organizations devoted to its preservation, among them the American Cowboy Culture Association.

== Notable people ==
The following is a list of notable people who lived or are living a western lifestyle post to its technological and societal change at the beginning of the 20th century. This list does not include those of whom lived during the 19th century who were living in what was considered the Old West and preoccupied with the western norms of the day.

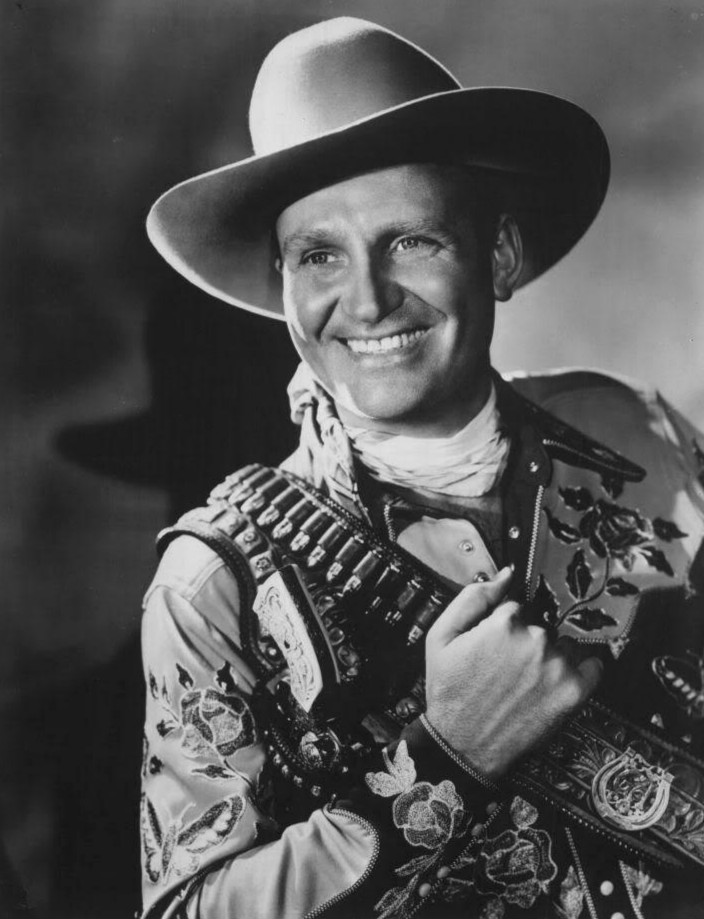
Gene Autry

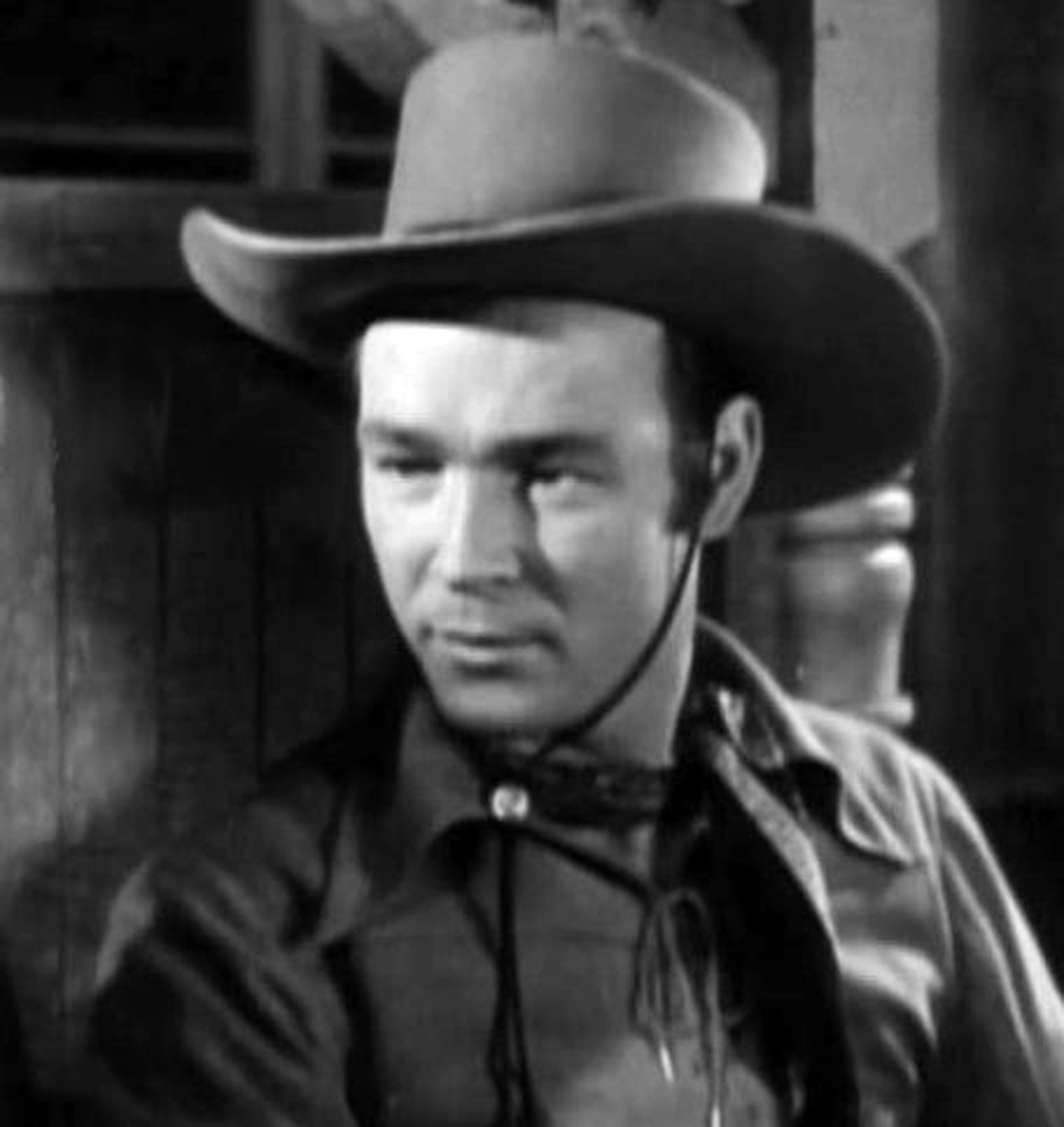
Roy Rogers

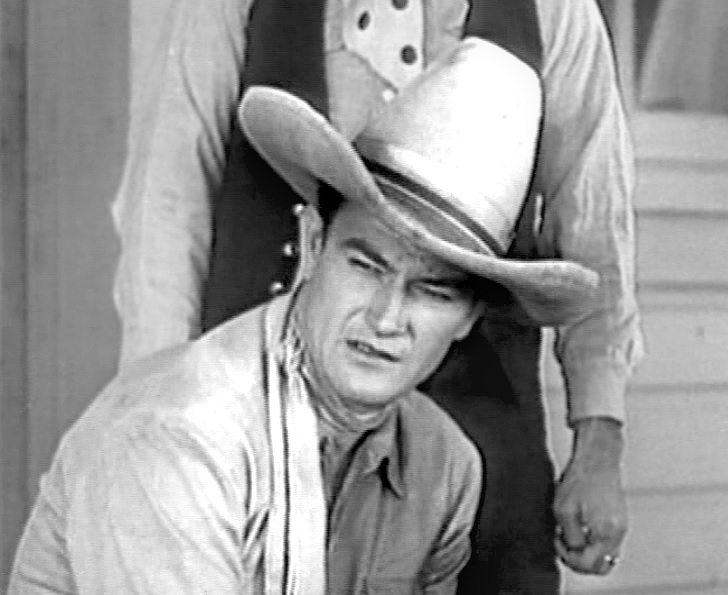
John Wayne

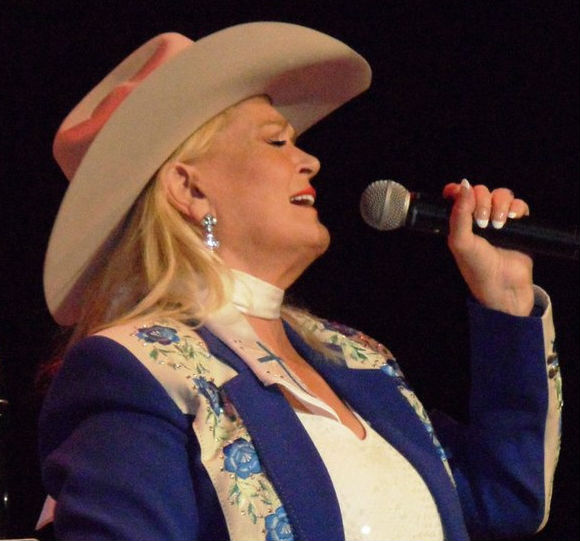
Lynn Anderson

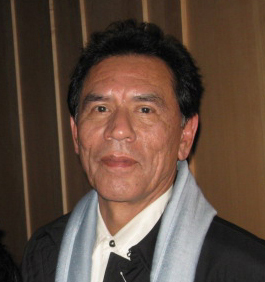
Wes Studi

=== Art ===
- Joe Beeler
- Albert Bierstadt painter
- Elsa Spear Byron, photographer
- George Catlin painter
- Evelyn Cameron, photographer, writer
- Deborah Copenhaver Fellows, sculptor
- Edward S. Curtis, photographer
- L. Frank
- Laura Gilpin, photographer
- Veryl Goodnight, sculptor
- Hildred Goodwine, illustrator
- Maria Martinez
- Georgia O'Keeffe
- George Phippen
- Frederic Remington, painter
- Charles Marion Russell
- Howard Terpning
- Frank McCarthy

=== Business ===
- Minnie Lou Bradley, president of the American Angus Association
- Nellie Cashman
- Nudie Cohn
- Mary Colter, architect
- Margaret Formby, founder of National Cowgirl Museum and Hall of Fame
- Temple Grandin, inventor
- Enid Justin, founder of Nocona Boot Company
- Anne Windfohr Marion, founder of the Georgia O'Keeffe Museum
- Anna Mebus Martin
- Mollie Taylor Stevenson Jr., founder of the American Cowboy Museum
- Jackie Worthington, founder of the Girls Rodeo Association

=== Film and television ===
- Rex Allen, actor
- Wilford Brimley, actor, singer, cowboy
- Yakima Canutt, rodeo champion, actor, director
- Sunset Carson, actor
- Bill Cody
- Iron Eyes Cody, actor
- Robert Conrad, actor, singer
- Barry Corbin, actor
- Eddie Dean, singer, actor
- Joey Rocketshoes Dillon, singer-songwriter, gunslinger, actor, comedian
- Wild Bill Elliott
- Sam Elliot actor
- Helen Gibson actor, stunt woman
- Hoot Gibson
- Lorne Greene, actor, singer
- William S. Hart, actor, director, writer
- Jack Hoxie, rodeo performer, actor
- Al Jennings
- Ben Johnson, actor, stuntman, rodeo champion
- Lash LaRue, actor
- Tom Mix, actor
- Clayton Moore, actor
- Slim Pickens, actor, rodeo performer
- Charles Starrett, actor
- Bob Steele, actor
- Will Roberts, actor
- Will Rogers, actor, lasso expert, comedian, philanthropist
- Wes Studi, actor
- Fred Thompson, actor, politician
- Tom Tyler, actor
- John Wayne, actor
- Dennis Weaver, actor, environmental activist

=== Music ===
- Roy Acuff
- Tommy Allsup
- Lynne Anderson
- Gene Autry, actor, singer-songwriter
- Junior Barnard
- Bill Barwick
- Joe Bethancourt
- Johnny Bond
- Bill Boyd
- Cecil Brower
- Milton Brown
- Joe Carr
- Bill Carson
- Wilf Carter
- Johnny Cash
- Al Clauser
- Patsy Cline
- Hurshul Clothier
- Cowboy Copas
- Eddie Dean, singer, actor
- Little Jimmy Dickens
- Jimmie Dolan
- Tommy Duncan
- Bob Dunn
- Don Edwards
- Dale Evans, actor, singer
- Juni Fisher
- Curley Fletcher
- Scott Franklin
- Porky Freeman
- Lefty Frizzell
- Girls of the Golden West
- Jack Guthrie
- Monte Hale, actor, singer
- Tom T. Hall
- Adolph Hofner
- Johnny Horton
- Billy Hughes
- Prince Albert Hunt
- Wanda Jackson
- Cody Johnson singer-songwriter, former rodeo
- Frankie Laine
- Fred LaBour
- Chris LeDoux, singer, rodeo champion
- Merl Lindsay
- Corb Lund and the Hurtin' Albertans
- Rose Maddox
- Joe Maphis
- Leon McAuliffe
- Patsy Montana
- Tiny Moore
- Moon Mullican
- Michael Martin Murphey
- Red Murrell
- Willie Nelson
- Bob Nolan
- Buck Owens
- Webb Pierce
- Ray Price
- The Quebe Sisters Band
- Leon Rausch
- Riders in the Sky
- Tex Ritter
- Jimmie Rodgers
- Marty Robbins
- Roy Rogers, actor, singer
- Smokey Rogers
- Tom Russell
- Eldon Shamblin
- Arkie Shibley
- Hank Snow
- Sons of the San Joaquin
- Sons of the Pioneers
- Tim Spencer
- Red Steagall
- Dave Stogner
- George Strait
- Hank Thompson
- Ernest Tubb
- Ian Tyson
- Porter Wagoner
- Jimmy Wakely
- Cindy Walker
- Kitty Wells
- Johnny Western
- Speedy West
- Paul Westmoreland
- John I. White
- Ray Whitley
- Slim Whitman
- Hank Williams
- Tex Williams
- Bob Wills

=== Literature ===
- Andy Adams, fiction writer
- Don Bendell, author, rancher
- Eulalia Bourne
- Matt Braun, author, rancher
- Willa Cather
- Ralph Compton
- Robert J. Conley
- Walt Coburn, author and son of the founder of the noted Circle C Ranch
- Angie Debo
- Chris Enss
- Zane Grey, author and dentist
- Fred Grove
- Laura Ingalls Wilder, author
- Craig Johnson, author
- Terry C. Johnston
- Elmer Kelton
- Mike Kearby, author and inventor
- Louis L'Amour, novelist and short story writer
- Caroline Lockhart, journalist and author
- Stan Lynde, author and illustrator
- Larry McMurtry author
- Mari Sandoz
- Elizabeth Savage
- Thomas Savage
- Jack Schaefer

=== Poetry ===
- S. Omar Barker
- Baxter Black
- Arthur Chapman
- Badger Clark
- Curley Fletcher
- Bruce Kiskaddon
- Wally McRae
- Joel Nelson
- Red Steagall
- Steven Fromholz
- Waddie Mitchell
- Paul Zarzyski

=== Politics ===
- Ben Nighthorse Campbell
- Simón de Arocha

=== Rodeo and Wild West performer ===
- Tillie Baldwin
- Faye Blackstone
- Earl W. Bascom, most decorated rodeo performer and an inventor of rodeo equipment, inducted into both American and Canadian pro rodeo halls of fame
- Everett Bowman
- Louis Brooks
- Trevor Brazile, world rodeo champion
- Ann Lowdon Call, Pleasure Driving champion
- Clay Carr
- Roy Cooper
- Tom R. Ferguson
- Lewis Feild
- Bee Ho Gray
- Prairie Rose Henderson, bronc rider
- Ryan Jarrett Hall of Fame rodeo champion
- Bill Linderman
- Phil Lyne
- Larry Mahan
- Bonnie McCarroll
- Vera McGinnis
- Dan Mortensen
- Lucille Mulhall
- Ty Murray
- Annie Oakley
- Alice Greenough Orr
- Lulu Bell Parr
- Benny Reynolds
- Ruth Roach
- Fern Sawyer
- Jim Shoulders
- Fannie Sperry Steele
- Buck Taylor
- Casey Tibbs, rodeo performer and actor
- Fred Whitfield, rodeo performer

=== Barrel racing ===
- Mary Burger
- Wanda Harper Bush
- Sherry Cervi
- Charmayne James
- Martha Josey
- Mary Walker

=== Bull riding ===
- Art Acord, rodeo champion, actor
- Warren G. Brown
- J.W. Harris
- Tuff Hedeman
- Scott Mendes
- Shane Proctor
- Charlie Sampson, bull rider
- Jim "Razor" Sharp
- Wesley Silcox
- Jan Youren
- Lane Frost

=== Roping ===
- Mary Ellen (Dude) Barton
- Buck Brannaman
- Florence LaDue
- Dave Thornbury, lasso expert, trick rider

=== Riding ===
- Anna Lee Aldred, trick rider
- Ken Maynard, trick rider, actor
- Pat North Ommert, trick rider, actor

=== Steer wrestling ===
- Bill Pickett
- Cowboy Morgan Evans

== Notable livestock and companions ==
=== Bucking bulls ===
- Bushwacker, three-time World Champion Professional Bull Riders (PBR) bucking bull, PBR Heroes & Legends Celebration: Brand of Honor bull
- Bodacious, Professional Rodeo Cowboys Association (PRCA) and PBR champion title holder, "world's most dangerous bull," Hall of Fame bull
- Bruiser, (2016-2018) consecutive three-time World Champion PBR bucking bull, 2017 PRCA Bucking Bull of the Year, in the running in 2019 to become first 4-time world champion
- Little Yellow Jacket (2002-2004) consecutive three-time World Champion PBR bucking bull, PBR Heroes and Legends inaugural 2011 Brand of Honor bull

=== Entertainment horses ===
- Budweiser Clydesdales
- Buttermilk, Dale Evans horse
- Champion the Wonder Horse, Gene Autry's on screen companion, previously owned by Tom Mix
- Fritz, William S. Hart's silent film riding and stunt red pinto.
- Trigger, Roy Rogers companion palomino.

=== Rodeo horses ===
- Scamper, 10 Women's Professional Rodeo Association World Barrel Racing Championships, 7 National Finals Rodeo Average championships, first barrel horse inducted into ProRodeo Hall of Fame
- Scottie, steer wrestling, the chestnut gelding was able to take three cowboys to four world championships, hall of fame horse

== Notable entities ==
=== Businesses ===
- Aztec Land & Cattle Company
- Buck Owens Crystal Palace, western themed restaurant and music hall
- High Noon Western Americana, western art and antique auction house
- LongHorn Steakhouse, western- and Texas-themed restaurant chain
- Texas Roadhouse, western-themed restaurant chain
- Saddle Ranch Chop House, western-themed restaurant chain

=== Events ===
- Frontier Days (rodeo)
- Santa Clarita Cowboy Festival
- Stagecoach Days (Banning, California)
- Western Heritage Awards

=== Populated and ghost towns ===
- Abilene, Kansas
- Bandera, Texas
- Bannack, Montana
- Bishop, California
- Bodie, California
- Buffalo, Wyoming
- Calico Ghost town
- Cody, Wyoming
- Columbia, California
- Deadwood, South Dakota
- Dodge City, Kansas
- Dunton Hot Springs, Colorado
- Durango, Colorado
- El Paso, Texas
- Elk Falls, Kansas
- Fort Sumner, New Mexico
- Garnet, Montana
- Idaho City, Idaho
- Julian, California
- Kanab, Utah
- Kennecott, Alaska
- Kenton, Oklahoma
- Laramie, Wyoming
- Lincoln, New Mexico
- Mogollon, New Mexico
- Oatman, Arizona
- Old Town San Diego, California
- Prescott, Arizona
- Randsburg, California
- Rhyolite, Nevada
- Shakespeare, New Mexico
- Sheridan, Wyoming
- St. Elmo, Colorado
- Telluride, Colorado
- Tombstone, Arizona
- Trinidad, Colorado
- Virginia City, Montana
- Virginia City, Nevada
- Vulture Mine, Arizona

=== Historic Properties ===
- Dalton Gang Hideout and Museum
- Winchester Mystery House

=== Movie ranches still in operation ===
- Big Sky Ranch
- Golden Oak Ranch
- Melody Ranch
- Paramount Ranch
- Old Tucson Studios
- Pioneertown, California
- Southfork Ranch
- Will Rogers State Historic Park

=== Museums ===
- Autry Museum of the American West
- Bull Riding Hall of Fame
- Colorado Springs Pioneer Museum
- National Cowboy & Western Heritage Museum
- National Cowgirl Museum and Hall of Fame
- Oakdale Cowboy Museum
- Old Cowtown Museum in Wichita, Kansas
- ProRodeo Hall of Fame
- Roy Rogers-Dale Evans Museum, defunct
- Western Heritage Center
- Western Heritage Museum and Lea County Cowboy Hall of Fame

=== Organizations ===
- Academy of Western Artists
- Academy of Country Music
- American Cowboy Culture Association
- Cowboy Cartoonists International
- Cowboy Heritage Association of Fort Worth
- Professional Rodeo Cowboys Association
- Western Writers of America
- Women's Professional Rodeo Association

=== Theme Parks ===
- The American Adventure Theme Park
- Attractiepark Slagharen
- Bobbejaanland
- Bonnie Springs Ranch
- Buckskin Joe
- Cowboyland
- Fraispertuis City
- Frontier City
- Frontierland, Morecambe
- Ghost Town & Calico Railroad
- Ghost Town Village
- Gold Gulch
- High Chaparral Theme Park
- Hillerstorp
- Knotts Berry Farm ghost town
- Marshal Scotty's Playland Park
- Mini Hollywood
- Old Tucson Studios
- Old Vegas
- Six Gun Territory
- Texas Hollywood
- Western Leone
- Wild Waves Theme Park
- Wild West City
- Wild West World

=== Competitions ===
- Cowboy action shooting

== Notable media ==
=== Print ===
- Canadian Cowboy Country Magazine
- Cowboys & Indians Magazine
- True West Magazine

== See also ==
- Gaucho culture
- Cowboy church
- Rodeo
- Western (genre)
  - Cowboy poetry
  - Western comics
  - Western music (North America)
  - Western fiction
  - Singing cowboy
  - Space Western
  - Spaghetti Western
    - List of Spaghetti Western films
  - Western wear
