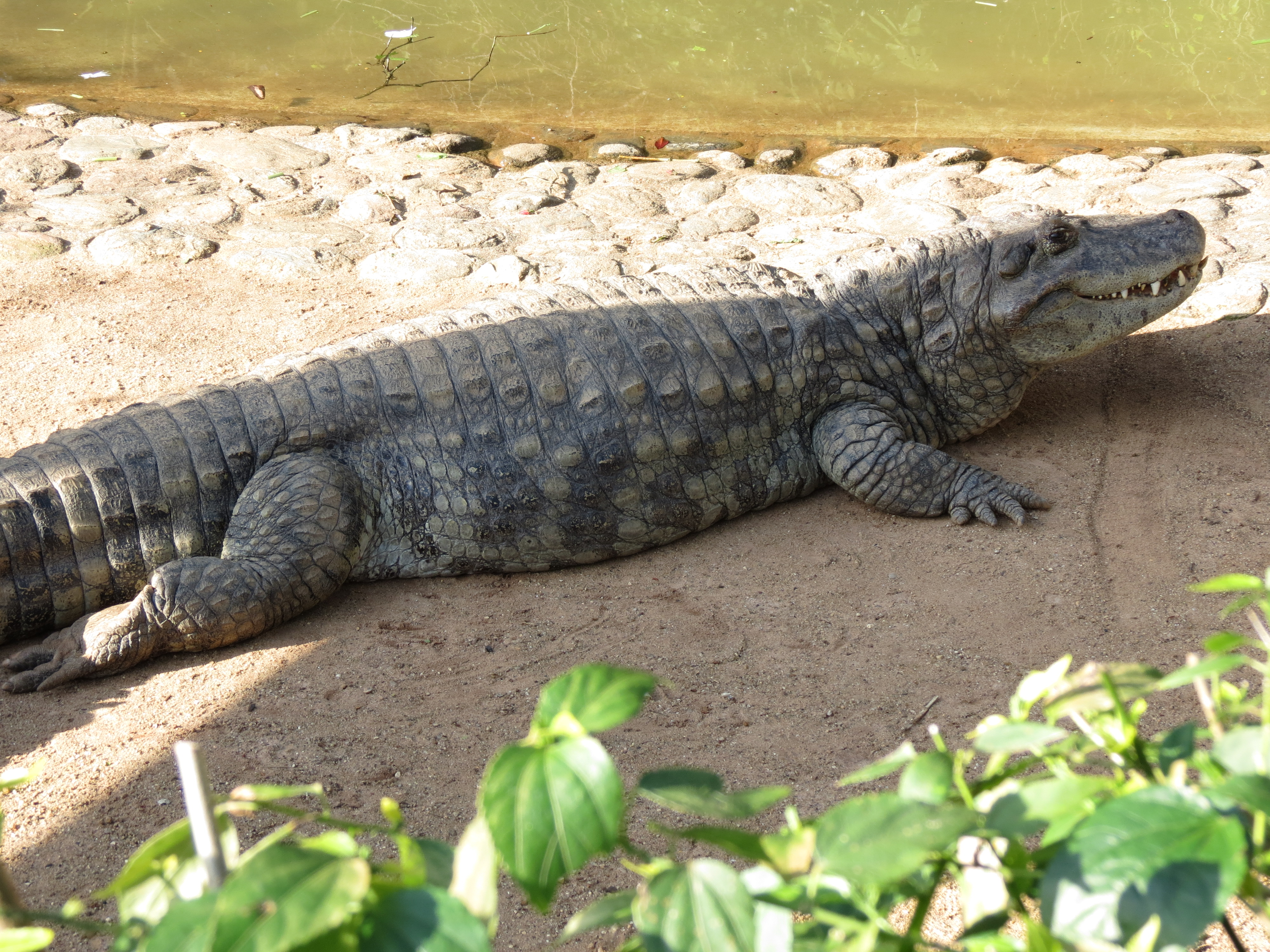
- At São Paulo Zoo, Brazil

Conservation status
- Least Concern (IUCN 3.1)
- CITES Appendix I (Note: Except populations of Argentina and Brazil which are included in Appendix II.)

Scientific classification
- Kingdom: Animalia
- Phylum: Chordata
- Class: Reptilia
- Order: Crocodylia
- Family: Alligatoridae
- Subfamily: Caimaninae
- Clade: Jacarea
- Genus: Caiman
- Species: C. latirostris

Binomial name
- Caiman latirostris Daudin, 1801
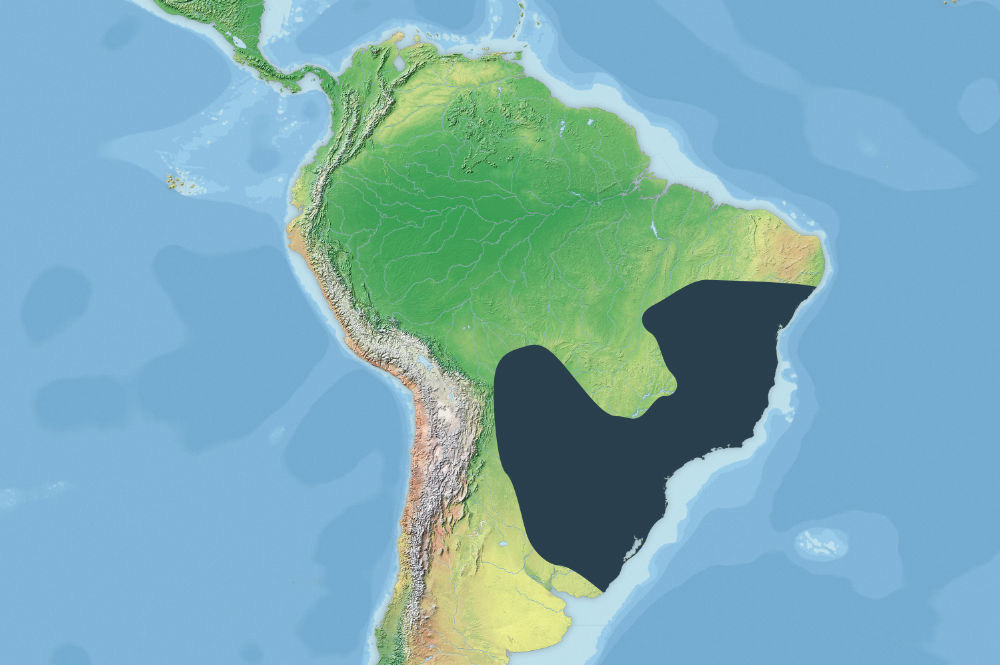
- Broad-snouted caiman range

Synonyms
- Species synonymy: cynocephalus Dumeril & Bibron, 1836; fissipes Spix, 1825; lutescens Rovereto, 1912; sclerops Wied, 1825

= Broad-snouted caiman =

Broad-snouted caiman Temporal range: Late Miocene – Present, 9–0 Ma

Species of reptile

The broad-snouted caiman (Caiman latirostris) is a crocodilian in the family Alligatoridae found in eastern and central South America, including the Pantanal habitat of Bolivia, Southeast Brazil, and Paraguay, as well as northern Argentina and Uruguay. Behind the black caiman (Melanosuchus niger), it is the second-largest caiman species; it is the third-largest alligatorid behind the American alligator (Alligator mississippiensis) and the aforementioned black caiman. Primarily, the species inhabits freshwater wetlands, including floodplains, marshes, swamps, and some mangrove forests, as well as various streams, rivers, lakes or ponds, preferring bodies of rather still or slower-moving water. They will often use man-made cow ponds, disused stock tanks, and canals and ditches, as well.

== Classification ==
The broad-snouted caiman is one of three extant (living) species of the genus Caiman, the other two being the Spectacled caiman (Caiman crocodilus) and the Yacare caiman (Caiman yacare). There are also several extinct fossil species in the genus Caiman, possibly up to eight species. The broad-snouted caiman is a member of the caiman subfamily Caimaninae, and is one of six living species of caiman. Its relationship to the other caimans can be shown in the cladogram below, based on molecular DNA-based phylogenetic studies:

- Alligatoridae
  - Caimaninae
    - - Paleosuchus palpebrosus Cuvier's dwarf caiman
      - Paleosuchus trigonatus Schneider's dwarf caiman
    - Jacarea
      - - - Caiman crocodilus Spectacled caiman
          - Caiman yacare Yacare caiman
        - Caiman latirostris Broad-snouted caiman
      - Melanosuchus niger Black caiman
  - Alligatorinae
    - Alligator sinensis Chinese alligator
    - Alligator mississippiensis American alligator

== Characteristics ==
In the wild, adults normally grow to 2 to 2.5 m (6 ft 7 in to 8 ft 2 in) in length, but a few old males have been recorded to reach up to 3.5 m (11 ft). Captive adults have weighed 23 to 65 kg (51 to 143 lb). A large adult male of 2.6 m (8 ft 6 in) would weigh around 80 kg (180 lb). Most tend to be of a light olive-green color. A few individuals have spots on their faces. The most notable physical characteristic is the broad snout from which its name is derived. The snout is well adapted to rip through the dense vegetation of the marshes. Due to this, they swallow some of the dense vegetation while foraging for food.

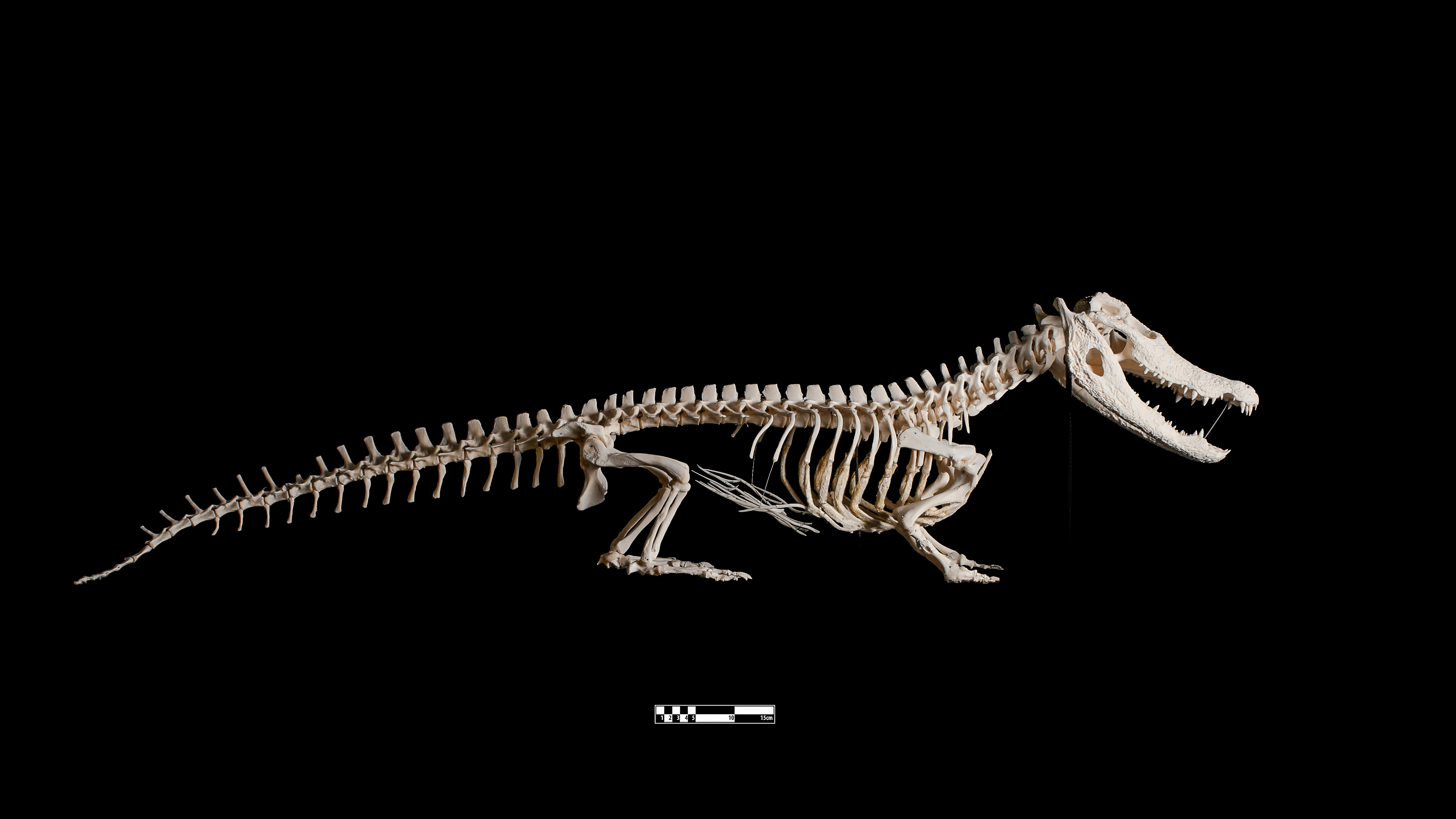
Caiman latirostris skeleton

== Biology and behavior ==
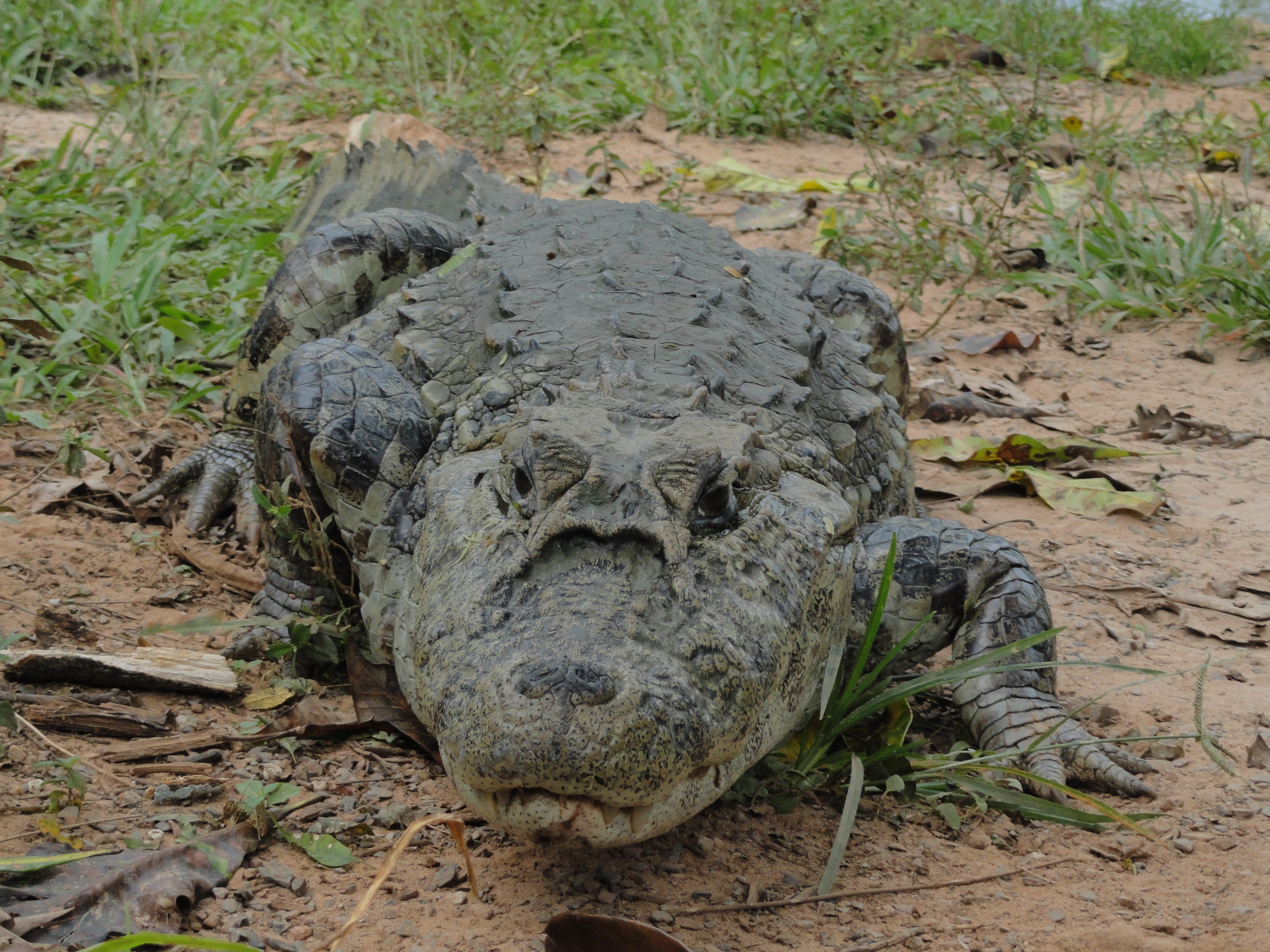
Broad-snouted caiman (Caiman latirostris) on the border of pond in Bonito, Mato Grosso do Sul, Brazil

The broad-snouted caiman is ectothermic, depending on its external environment to regulate its body temperature. Its heart rate increases as the temperature increases and decreases when the temperature is lowered. The heat of the sun is absorbed through the skin into the blood, keeping its body temperature up. An increased heart rate helps the newly absorbed heat transfer throughout the body more quickly. When the air becomes cooler, the need for the heart rate to remain elevated is lost.

Young caimans rely heavily on their ability to find shelter to avoid predation. This behavior drops off as they age.

=== Hunting and diet ===
Upon hatching, the diet of the broad-nosed caiman consists mainly of small invertebrates it can find, such as beetles or arachnids. As the caiman reaches adolescence, it learns to crush shells with its jaws more effectively, enabling it to feed on more substantial prey, such as turtles and snails (including ampullarid snails). As C. latirostris reaches maturity, the size of its prey tends to increase. Young adult caimans still maintain a diet consisting of mostly invertebrates; however, older animals greatly vary their diet, increasing their intake of small mammals, birds, larger fish, amphibians, and reptiles.

==== Omnivory ====
Captive specimens have been documented (and photographed) devouring the cone-shaped, mildly sweet fruits of 'split-leaf philodendron' (Philodendron bipinnatifidum) without external stimulation, though it is unclear if this is because of them being housed with omnivorous reptiles, such as tegu, or a genuinely natural curiosity or feeding behaviour. A later study also concluded that C. latirostris and its relatives are obligate omnivores, and indeed play an important role in the dispersal of plant seeds in their habitats.

=== Reproduction ===
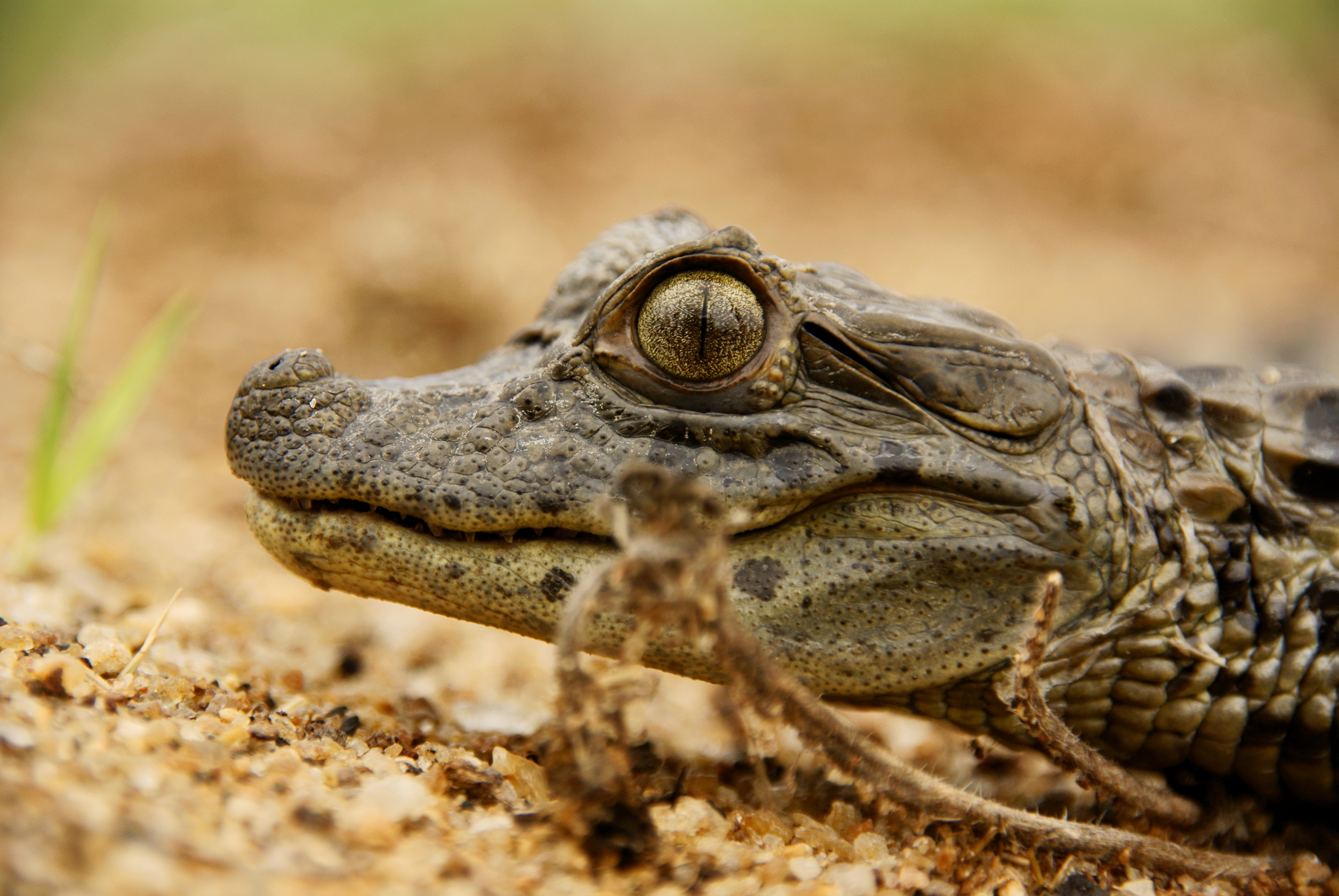
Broad-snouted caiman baby

The female lays 18 to 50 eggs at a time. While rare, up to 129 eggs have been found within a single nest, presumably from several layings. They lay their eggs in two layers, with a slight temperature difference between the two layers. This will result in a more even ratio of males and females. The caiman does not have sex chromosomes, but instead depends on temperature to determine the ratio of male and female offspring. Eggs at warmer temperatures (32 °C (90 °F) or higher) develop into males and eggs at cooler temperatures (31 °C (88 °F) or lower) develop into females. Estrogen levels and stress levels of the mother can have an effect. Nests reared at the same temperature can differ in sex ratio. This indicates there are other factors that contribute to a nest having male or female eggs.

== Conservation ==
Larger-scale hunting of C. latirostris began in the 1940s, as the species' skin was greatly valued for leather production, with its smoother texture compared to other crocodilians. Until South American countries made hunting them illegal, this was by far the largest threat to the species. An eventual ban on hunting helped them to regain their population. The newest threat is habitat destruction. Deforestation and pollution run-off are the two leading causes to this loss of habitat.
