= Duarte's Tavern =

Coordinates: 37°15′8″N 122°22′58″W

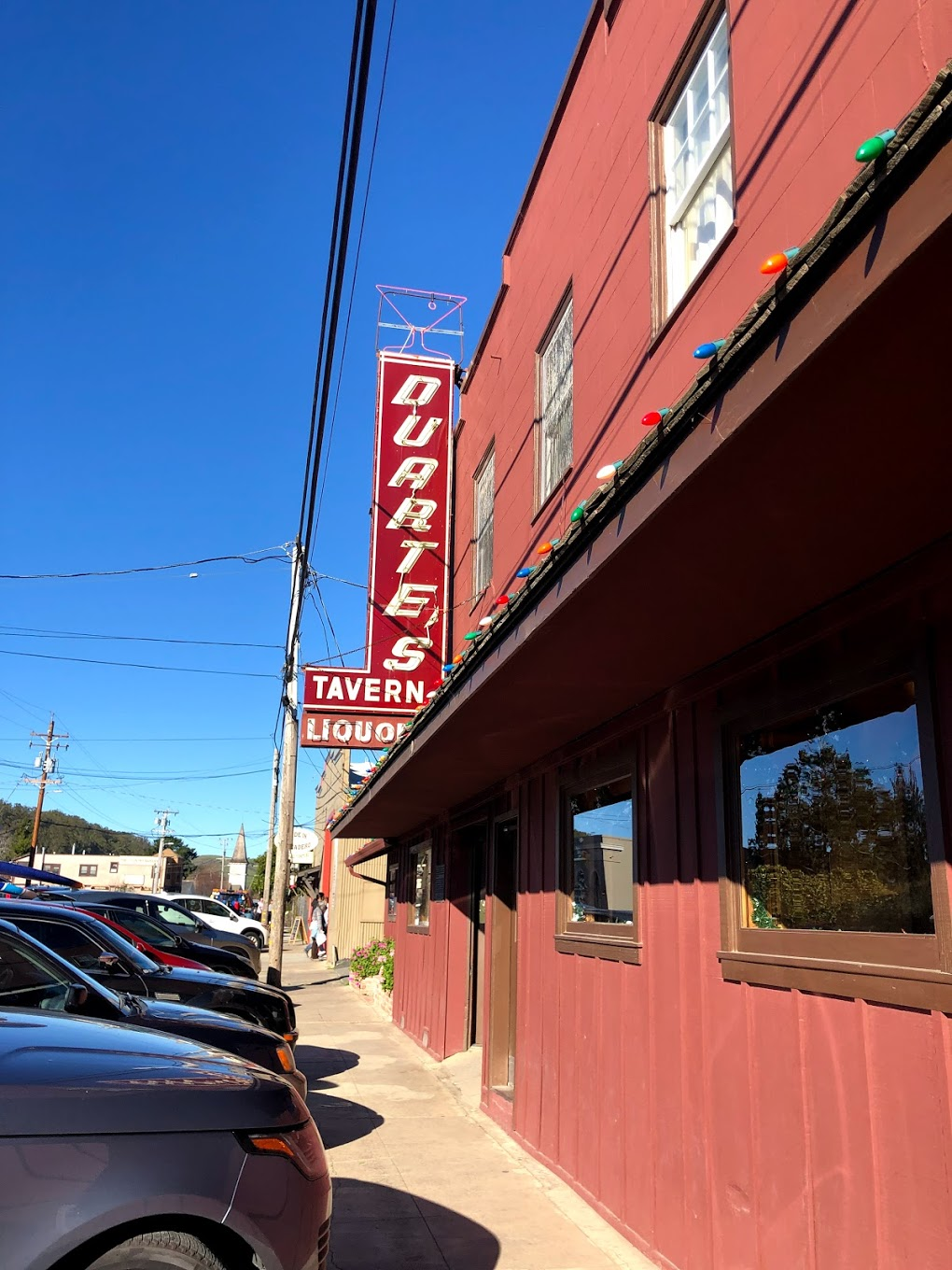

Restaurant information
- Established: 1894; 131 years ago
- Location: 202 Stage Coach Road, Pescadero, California
- Website: http://www.duartestavern.com/

Duarte's Tavern is a historic drinking establishment and restaurant, founded in 1894 and located at 202 Stage Road in Pescadero, California.

== About ==
Duarte's Tavern was founded in 1894, by Frank Duarte, a Portuguese immigrant who bought the building for approximately $12 worth of gold. As of 2017, it was owned and operated by the fourth generation of the Duarte family.

They are well known for their olallieberry pie, artichoke soup (which is also served as half artichoke and half green chile soup) and cioppino, a signature item that was described as "bone-warming" but "very messy". The cuisine includes seafood such as fried oysters with fries, snapper, and a crab sandwich which, according to the San Francisco Chronicle's Michael Bauer, had "a lot of thought put into it" with the inside of the sourdough bread toasted enough to hold a "pile of crab" and a "leaf of lettuce". The menu also includes non-seafood items such as a hot beef sandwich with mashed potatoes and gravy.

Duarte's Tavern

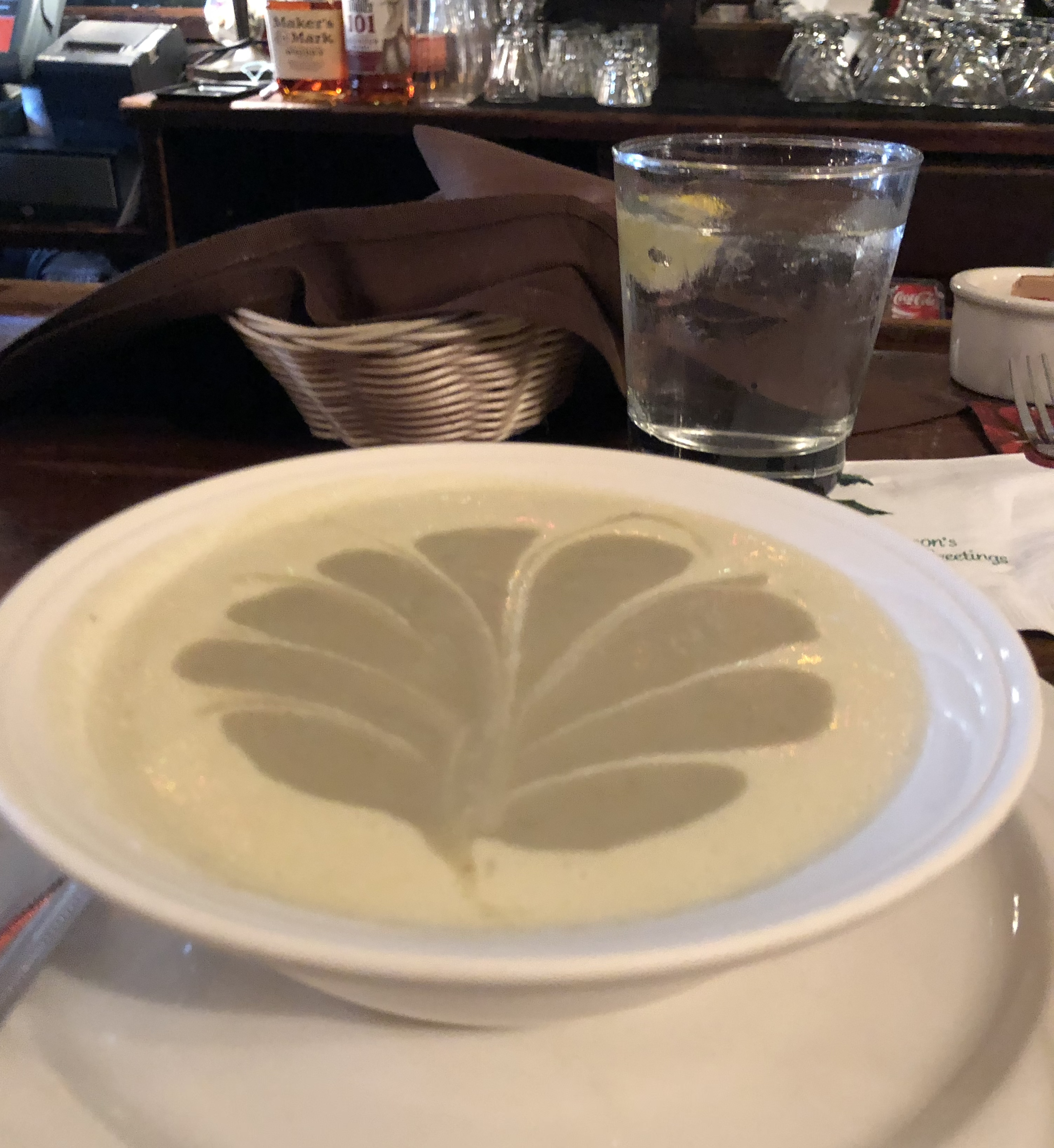
half artichoke and half green chile soup

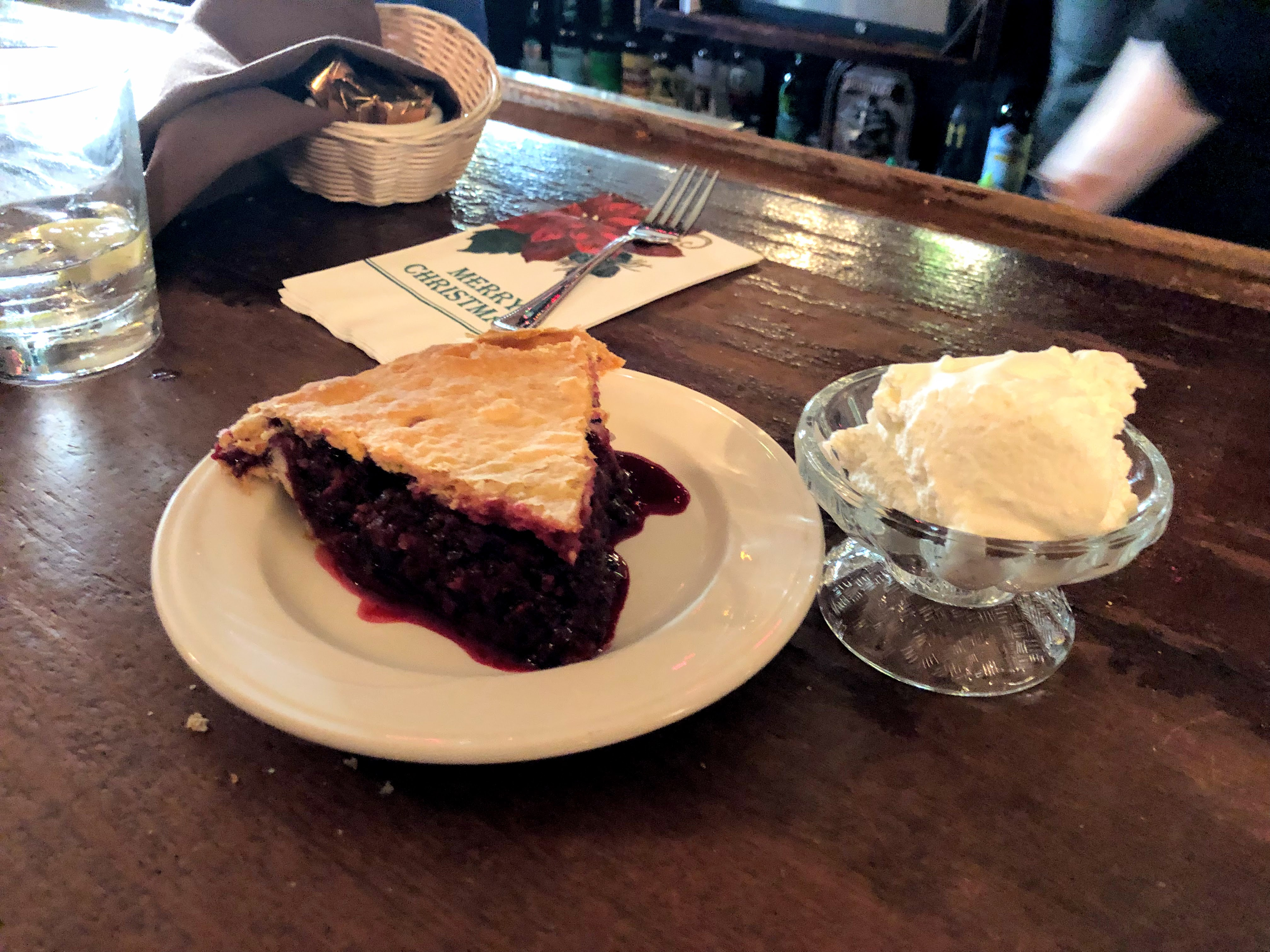
olallieberry pie slice

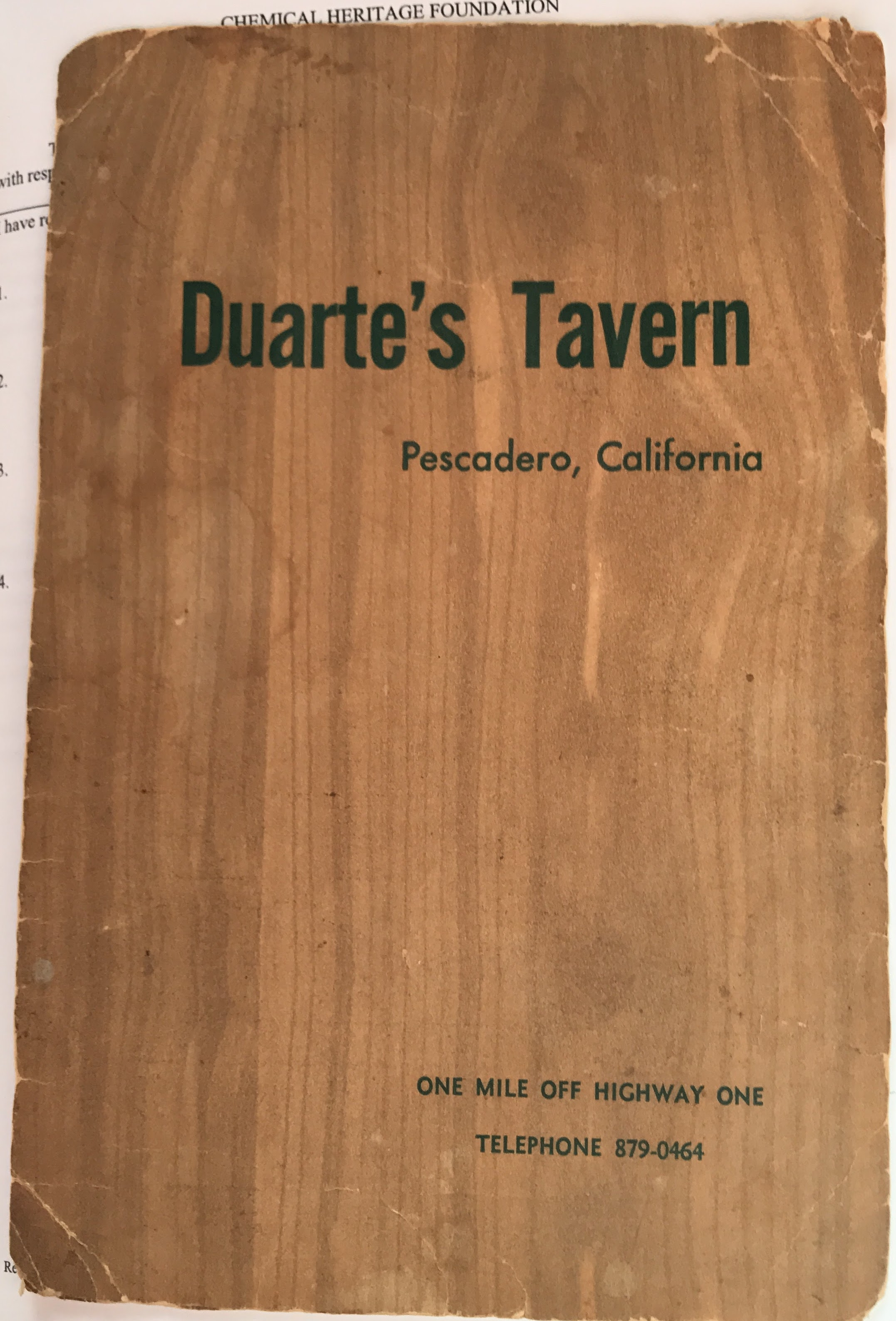
An old menu for Duarte's Tavern

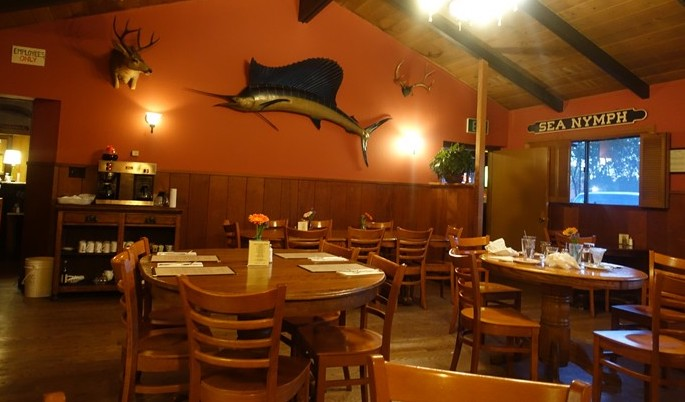
Duarte's Tavern dining room (2017)

== Reception ==
In 2017, Dana Joseph, writing for the Cowboys & Indians magazine, called the cioppino at Duarte's Tavern a "flavorful crab-crammed delight".

On October 22, 2007, Duarte's Tavern was featured on the fourth episode of the second season of the television show, Diners, Drive-Ins and Dives entitled "Local Flavors". In 2003, Duarte's Tavern received the James Beard American Classic Award.
