= F48 =

F48 may refer to:

- BMW X1 (F48), an automobile
- GER Class F48, a class of British steam locomotives
- HMAS Manoora (F48), an ocean liner that served in the Royal Australian Navy
- HMS Dundas (F48), a Blackwood-class frigate of the Royal Navy
- INS Satpura (F48), a Shivalik-class frigate of the Indian Navy
- Nocona Airport, in Montague County, Texas
