= PRCA All-Around Champion =

American rodeo series champion (1929– )

This is a list of PRCA All-Around Champions. The championship is awarded at the National Finals Rodeo by the Professional Rodeo Cowboys Association to the top all-around competitor.

Year	Cowboy	Hometown	Country	Refs (Note: Source for 1929 to 2017 is from Professional Rodeo Cowboys Association; note that 1945 and 1946 All-Around Champion is missing from their historical data, though champions for those years in all other categories are included.)
1929	Earl Thode	Belvedere, South Dakota	United States	
1930	Clay Carr	Visalia, California	United States	
1931	John Schneider	Livermore, California	United States	
1932	Donald Nesbit	Snowflake, Arizona	United States	
1933	Clay Carr	Visalia, California	United States	
1934	Leonard Ward	Talent, Oregon	United States	
1935	Everett Bowman	Hillside, Arizona	United States	
1936	John Bowman	Oakdale, California	United States	
1937	Everett Bowman	Hillside, Arizona	United States	
1938	Burel Mulkey	Salmon, Idaho	United States	
1939	Paul Carney	Galeton, Colorado	United States	
1940	Fritz Truan	Long Beach, California	United States	
1941	Homer Pettigrew	Grady, New Mexico	United States	
1942	Gerald Roberts	Strong City, Kansas	United States	
1943	Louis Brooks	Pittsburg, Oklahoma	United States	
1944	Louis Brooks	Pittsburg, Oklahoma	United States	
1945				n/a
1946				n/a
1947	Todd Whatley	Hugo, Oklahoma	United States	
1948	Gerald Roberts	Strong City, Kansas	United States	
1949	Jim Shoulders	Henryetta, Oklahoma	United States	
1950	Bill Linderman	Red Lodge, Montana	United States	
1951	Casey Tibbs	Fort Pierre, South Dakota	United States	
1952	Harry Tompkins	Dublin, Texas	United States	
1953	Bill Linderman	Red Lodge, Montana	United States	
1954	Buck Rutherford	Lenapah, Oklahoma	United States	
1955	Casey Tibbs	Fort Pierre, South Dakota	United States	
1956	Jim Shoulders	Henryetta, Oklahoma	United States	
1957	Jim Shoulders	Henryetta, Oklahoma	United States	
1958	Jim Shoulders	Henryetta, Oklahoma	United States	
1959	Jim Shoulders	Henryetta, Oklahoma	United States	
1960	Harry Tompkins	Dublin, Texas	United States	
1961	Benny Reynolds	Melrose, Montana	United States	
1962	Tom Nesmith	Bethel, Oklahoma	United States	
1963	Dean Oliver	Boise, Idaho	United States	
1964	Dean Oliver	Boise, Idaho	United States	
1965	Dean Oliver	Boise, Idaho	United States	
1966	Larry Mahan	Brooks, Oregon	United States	
1967	Larry Mahan	Brooks, Oregon	United States	
1968	Larry Mahan	Salem, Oregon	United States	
1969	Larry Mahan	Salem, Oregon	United States	
1970	Larry Mahan	Brooks, Oregon	United States	
1971	Phil Lyne	George West, Texas	United States	
1972	Phil Lyne	George West, Texas	United States	
1973	Larry Mahan	Dallas, Texas	United States	
1974	Tom R. Ferguson	Miami, Oklahoma	United States	
1975	Tom R. Ferguson	Miami, Oklahoma (tie)	United States	
1975	Leo Camarillo	Oakdale, California (tie)	United States	
1976	Tom R. Ferguson	Miami, Oklahoma	United States	
1977	Tom R. Ferguson	Miami, Oklahoma	United States	
1978	Tom R. Ferguson	Miami, Oklahoma	United States	
1979	Tom R. Ferguson	Miami, Oklahoma	United States	
1980	Paul Tierney	Rapid City, South Dakota	United States	
1981	Jimmie Cooper	Monument, New Mexico	United States	
1982	Chris Lybbert	Coyote, California	United States	
1983	Johnny Whitworth	Chester, Texas	United States	
1984	Dee Pickett	Caldwell, Idaho	United States	
1985	Lewis Feild	Elk Ridge, Utah	United States	
1986	Lewis Feild	Elk Ridge, Utah	United States	
1987	Lewis Feild	Elk Ridge, Utah	United States	
1988	Dave Appleton	Clermont, Queensland	Australia	
1989	Ty Murray	Odessa, Texas	United States	
1990	Ty Murray	Stephenville, Texas	United States	
1991	Ty Murray	Stephenville, Texas	United States	
1992	Ty Murray	Stephenville, Texas	United States	
1993	Ty Murray	Stephenville, Texas	United States	
1994	Ty Murray	Stephenville, Texas	United States	
1995	Joe Beaver	Huntsville, Texas	United States	
1996	Joe Beaver	Huntsville, Texas	United States	
1997	Dan Mortensen	Manhattan, Montana	United States	
1998	Ty Murray	Stephenville, Texas	United States	
1999	Fred Whitfield	Hockley, Texas	United States	
2000	Joe Beaver	Huntsville, Texas	United States	
2001	Cody Ohl	Stephenville, Texas	United States	
2002	Trevor Brazile	Decatur, Texas	United States	
2003	Trevor Brazile	Decatur, Texas	United States	
2004	Trevor Brazile	Decatur, Texas	United States	
2005	Ryan Jarrett	Summerville, Georgia	United States	
2006	Trevor Brazile	Decatur, Texas	United States	
2007	Trevor Brazile	Decatur, Texas	United States	
2008	Trevor Brazile	Decatur, Texas	United States	
2009	Trevor Brazile	Decatur, Texas	United States	
2010	Trevor Brazile	Decatur, Texas	United States	
2011	Trevor Brazile	Decatur, Texas	United States	
2012	Trevor Brazile	Decatur, Texas	United States	
2013	Trevor Brazile	Decatur, Texas	United States	
2014	Trevor Brazile	Decatur, Texas	United States	
2015	Trevor Brazile	Decatur, Texas	United States	
2016	Junior Nogueira	Presidente Prudente, São Paulo	Brazil	
2017	Tuf Cooper	Weatherford, Texas	United States	
2018	Trevor Brazile	Decatur, Texas	United States	
2019	Stetson Wright	Milford, Utah	United States	
2020	Stetson Wright	Milford, Utah	United States	
2021	Stetson Wright	Milford, Utah	United States	
2022	Stetson Wright	Milford, Utah	United States	
2023	Stetson Wright	Milford, Utah	United States	
2024	Shad Mayfield	Clovis, New Mexico	United States	
2025	Stetson Wright	Beaver, Utah	United States	
