= Scottie (horse) =

Scottie (1957–1981) was a stock horse who excelled in steer wrestling and was inducted into the ProRodeo Hall of Fame in 2016. His owner, Walt Linderman, and he were inducted together into the Montana Cowboy Hall of Fame in 2020.

== Black ground ==
In 1957, Scottie was foaled in California. He was sired by Franks Quarter Master and out of Sandy Bug, by Hellzapoppin P-1755. Scottie was originally owned by Walter Scott, who bought him for $1,600.

Linderman, originally intended to use him as a "hazer"- a horse who is ridden parallel with the steer to ensure it runs in a straight line. In 1961, Linderman and Benny Reynolds were traveling together. They owned a team of steer wrestling horses. In 1965, one of the horses, named "Mama", was killed in an accident in the arena in Santa Maria, California. Scottie replaced her the next day. He took his first rider to a championship.

== Championships ==
=== Harley May ===
Harley May had already won two titles (1952, 1956) and had been Professional Rodeo Cowboys Association (PRCA) president in 1958-1959 and 1961 before teaming up with the eight-year-old Scottie in 1965. They made a good team and thus they got to the championship together. By the end of the year Harley got a 3rd world title and Scottie got his first of three cowboys to a championship.

=== Jack Roddy ===
Jack Roddy was a powerful force in steer wrestling. Jack and Scottie galloped on to get the championship honor in 1996 and 1998.

=== John W. Jones Sr. ===
By 1970, Scottie still was not stopping and, at the age of thirteen, he got one last cowboy who he needed to gallop to a championship. His name was John W. Jones Sr., and the gelding carried him to his first championship. Jones later said in a 1973 Hoofs and Horns article that "Scottie is the all-time great steer wrestling horse in my book. He’s the best horse to mount people because he can take so many runs without tiring. It seems like the more runs he makes, the stronger he gets. There’s no horse I’ve ever seen that was in his class."

== National Finals Rodeo appearances ==
From 1964–1973 (nine years), Scottie performed with Walt at the National Finals Rodeo. He had three second place finishes with Walt in 1966, 1970, and 1971. They also won the NFR Steer Wrestling Average in 1967. Also, six (five consecutive) NFR Steer Wrestling titles were won on Scottie (hazed by Walt). In a period of many years, of the top 15 steer wrestlers, from five to eight finalists chose to ride Scottie.

Steer wrestlers won an estimated total of $2 million on Scottie.

== Other wins ==
Although he retired from top-level competition after 1970, Scottie proved a useful partner for less experienced riders. In 1971 Scottie carried Lynn Perry to a win the College National Finals Rodeo. Then at the age of 20 he carried Troy Yetter to a championship in the National High School Rodeo Association in 1977.

== Death ==
Scottie was retired in 1977 at the age of 24. He spent his retirement years on the Yetter Ranch in Arvada, Wyoming. Scottie died in 1981. They buried him on that ranch.

== Honors ==
- 2016 ProRodeo Hall of Fame
- 2020 Montana Cowboy Hall of Fame
