= Cowboy church =

Type of church that embraces cowboys culture

- iglesia vaquera
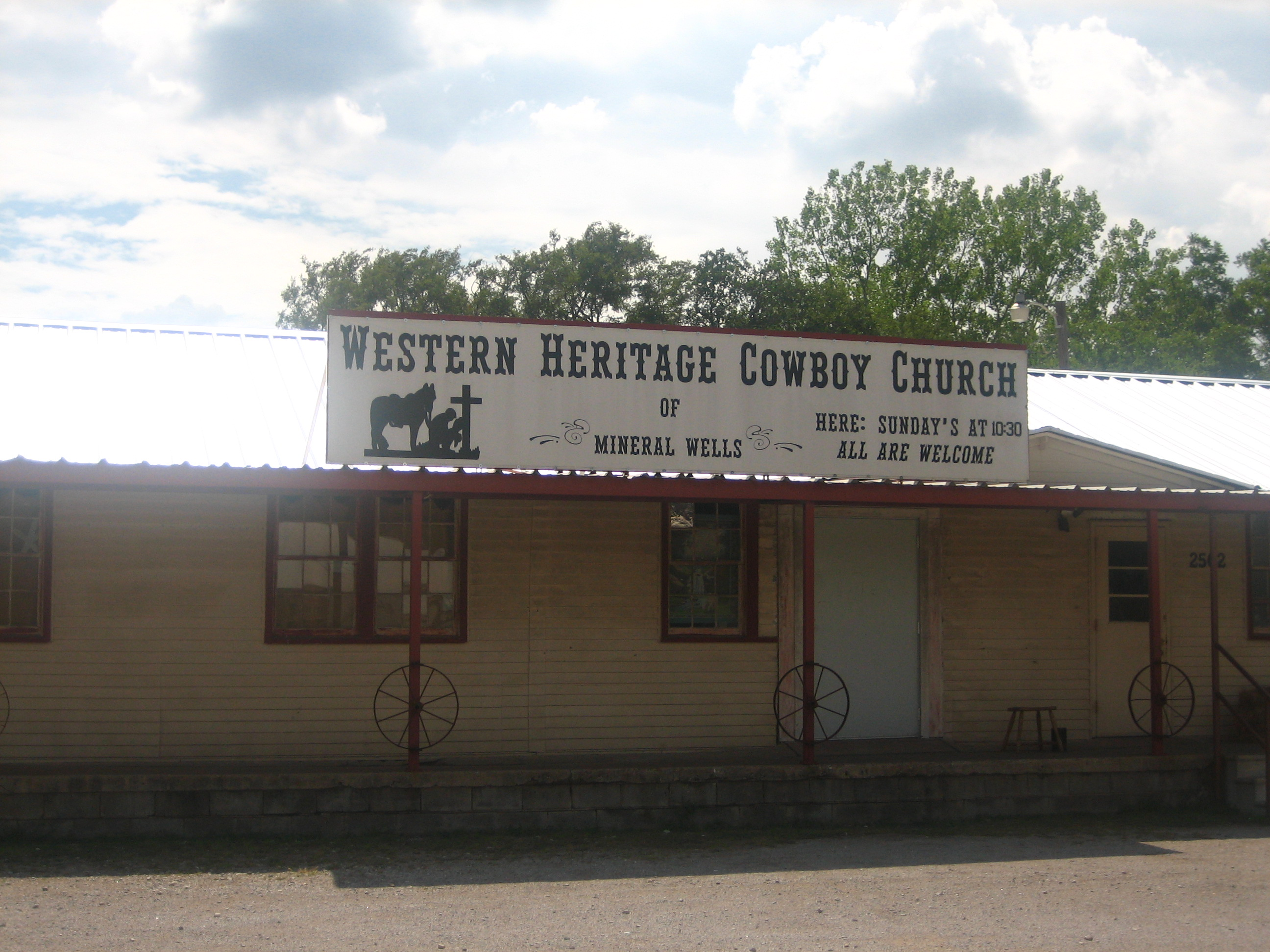
- A Cowboy Church in Mineral Wells, Texas
- Classification: Nondenominational
- Orientation: Catholic; Protestant; and Evangelical origins
- Scripture: Bible
- Polity: Congregational polity

A cowboy church is a Christian church that embraces the cowboy and Western lifestyle as a conduit to disseminate Christian teachings. A typical cowboy church may meet in a rural setting, often in a barn, metal building, arena, sale barn, Pueblo/Territorial adobe building, or other American frontier style structure. Often they have their own rodeo arena, and a country gospel band. Some cowboy churches have covered arenas where rodeo events like bull riding, team roping, ranch sorting, team penning and equestrian events are held.

Common areas of belief are that the Bible is the inspired and infallible Word of God, serving as the ultimate guide for faith and a Biblical worldview, and upholding the doctrine of the Trinity, recognizing God as one entity in three persons: the Father, the Son, and the Holy Spirit. They affirm that salvation is attained through accepting Jesus Christ as Savior and experiencing spiritual rebirth or what some may express as a born again experience. They practice water baptism by immersion either in the wilderness or in a stock tank emphasizing the importance of receiving the Holy Spirit. Additionally, they practice the continuation of spiritual gifts as illustrated in the New Testament.

The United States hosts approximately 5,000 cowboy churches, reflecting the widespread adoption and growth of the distinctive form of worship.

== History ==
Cowboy churches emerged in the 1970s. Ted Pressley formed the Baptist-affiliated Cowboys for Christ in 1970, and in 1972, former professional rodeo clown Glenn Smith formed the Rodeo Cowboys Ministry. Rodeo clown Wilbur Plaugher and calf-roping and steer-wrestling champion Mark Schricker formed the Fellowship of Christian Cowboys as a chapter of the Fellowship of Christian Athletes in 1974. The movement spread as Smith, Jeff Copenhaver, and others evangelized on bull-riding and rodeo circuits. In 1976, a church service was featured for the first time at the College National Finals Rodeo; in 1985, Copenhaver and Russ Weaver brought services to the Professional Rodeo Cowboy Association's National Finals Rodeo in Las Vegas. Copenhaver was then invited to lead weekly services at Billy Bob's Texas honky-tonk, which became "the first stationary contemporary cowboy church in the world."

== Churches ==
The churches are loosely associated through groups including the American Fellowship of Cowboy Churches, the Cowboy Church Network of North America, and the International Cowboy Church Alliance/Network. Not all churches embracing a cowboy and Western theme necessarily accept the label "cowboy church." Most are nondenominational, however they may be aligned with many larger denominations.

Most cowboy churches have very small town congregations. Mostly found in the United States, Canada, and Mexico, they are also in Australia, Asia, Russia, and other places. Some cowboy churches are megachurch scale with large congregations. The Cowboy Church of Ellis County in Waxahachie, Texas, is known as the largest cowboy church in the world, with over 1,700 members. The majority of the religious institutions integrate elements reminiscent of the American frontier, with some like the Ellis County church offering ranching and rodeo education in addition to fishing and groundskeeping skills. However, certain congregations opt to emphasize the ethos of contemporary Western United States culture, similar to a more traditional megachurch style. That is the case with Sagebrush Church in Albuquerque, New Mexico, encouraging outdoor recreation with a large main campus on the Rio Grande bosque, and modern American West concepts such as classic auto shows.
