= Nocona, Texas =

- City
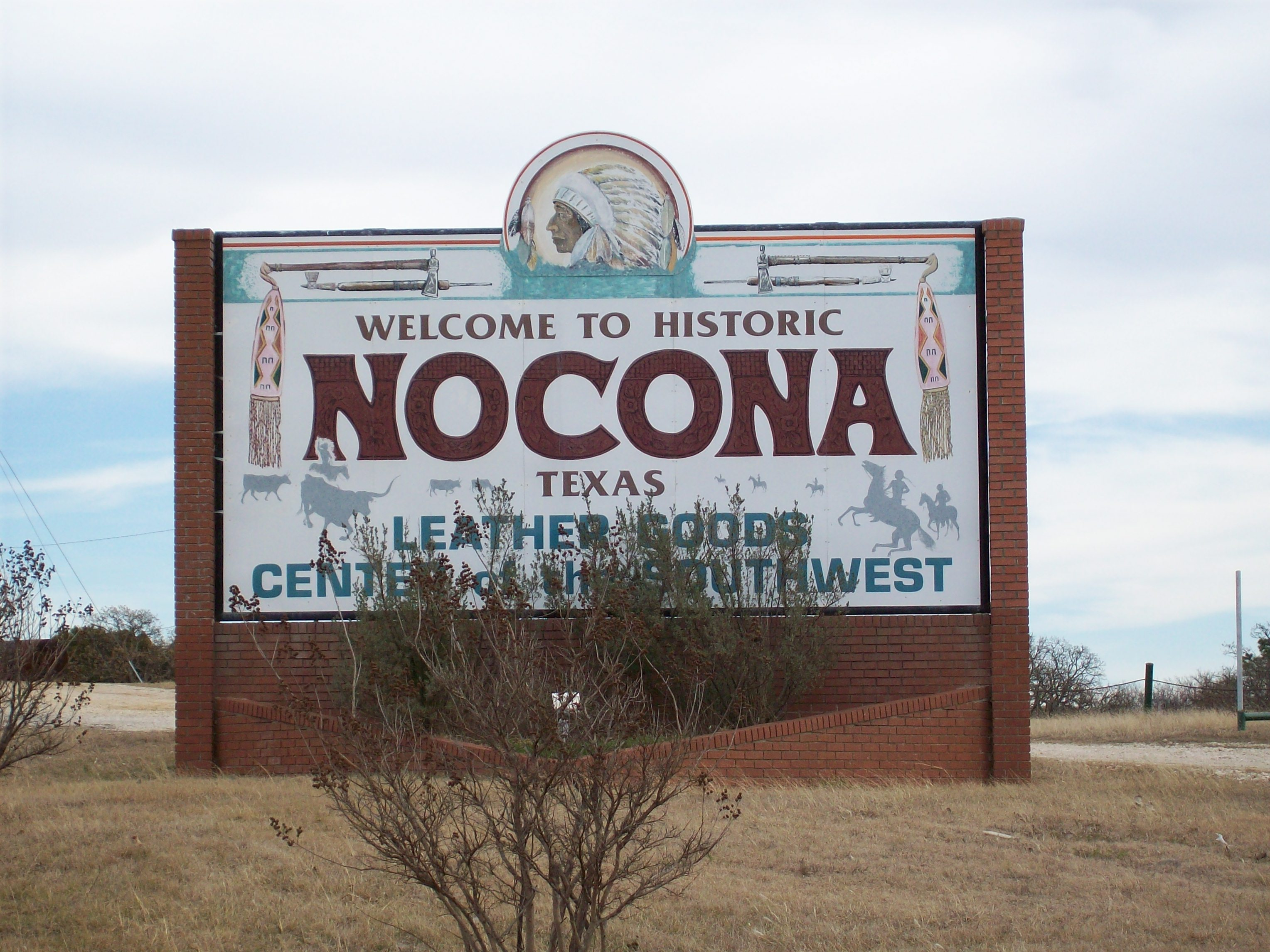
- Nocona welcome sign

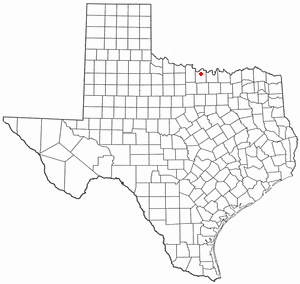
- Location of Nocona, Texas

- Coordinates: 33°47′01″N 97°43′49″W
- Country: United States
- State: Texas
- County: Montague

Area
  - Total: 2.81 sq mi (7.29 km^{2})
  - Land: 2.81 sq mi (7.29 km^{2})
  - Water: 0 sq mi (0.00 km^{2})
- Elevation: 971 ft (296 m)

Population (2020)
  - Total: 3,002
  - Density: 1,070/sq mi (412/km^{2})
- Time zone: UTC-6 (Central (CST))
  - Summer (DST): UTC-5 (CDT)
- ZIP code: 76255
- Area code: 940
- FIPS code: 48-51648
- GNIS feature ID: 2411259
- Website: https://cityofnocona.com/

Nocona is a city along U.S. Highway 82 and State Highway 175 in Montague County, Texas, United States. The population was 3,002 at the 2020 census.

== History ==
The city is named for Peta Nocona, the Comanche chief. The area was first known to white settlers as the last stop in Texas before crossing the Red River on the Chisolm Trail. It was founded in 1887 along a particular bend in the Gainesville, Henrietta and Western Railway line, which soon became part of the Missouri-Kansas-Texas Railroad, connecting Gainesville and Henrietta, and later Wichita Falls.

Nocona assumed the role of economic and industrial center of northern Montague County, and many older towns in the area, bypassed by the railroad, and its businesses shuttered. Its citizens moved to Nocona. The city has steadily maintained a population around 3000 since the 1940s, though industries responsible for its growth have come and gone. The "North Field", an oil field between Nocona and the Red River, contributed to Nocona's economy for much of the 20th century and continues to do so on a small scale. The MKT line, which was responsible for Nocona's founding, was abandoned in 1969 and the tracks removed in 1971.

Nocona also has a proud history of leather works and has been home to Justin Industries, Nocona Boot Company, Nokona Ballgloves, Nokona Athletic Goods and the Nocona Belt Company. Nocona Boot Company and Justin Industries have since moved; however, the Fenoglio Boot Company was established in 2014. . Integral to the Nocona economy is Nokona Nokona Athletic Goods Company (product names are spelled "Nokona"), which manufactures baseball and softball gloves, as well as MLB belts. In 2026 Nokona celebrated 100 years in business, being founded in August of 1926. Nokona now owns and is based out of the old Nocona Boot Co factory on US Highway 82.

Nocona has a lake, about 10 miles north of the city, appropriately named Lake Nocona, or Farmer's Creek Reservoir. It is a recreational lake popular with people from across north-central Texas. On Lake Nocona sits Nocona Hills, an attractive gated lakeside "city" with many homes, a hotel, golf course, landing strip, and other amenities. Nocona is also home to an 18-hole golf course, airstrip (FAA identifier F48), hospital, and one of the finest city parks in Texas.

== Geography ==
According to the United States Census Bureau, the city has a total area of 2.8 square miles (7.3 km^{2}), all land.

=== Climate ===
The climate in this area is characterized by hot, humid summers and generally mild to cool winters. According to the Köppen climate classification system, Nocona has a humid subtropical climate, Cfa on climate maps.

== Demographics ==
Historical population
Census	Pop.	Note	%±
1880	381		—
1890	381		0.0%
1900	961		152.2%
1910	1,333		38.7%
1920	1,422		6.7%
1930	2,352		65.4%
1940	2,605		10.8%
1950	3,022		16.0%
1960	3,127		3.5%
1970	2,871		−8.2%
1980	2,992		4.2%
1990	2,870		−4.1%
2000	3,198		11.4%
2010	3,033		−5.2%
2020	3,002		−1.0%
U.S. Decennial Census

=== 2020 census ===
As of the 2020 census, there were 3,002 people, 1,190 households, and 785 families residing in the city. The median age was 38.8 years, 25.0% of residents were under the age of 18, and 19.8% of residents were 65 years of age or older. For every 100 females there were 94.8 males, and for every 100 females age 18 and over there were 90.7 males age 18 and over.

Of the 1,190 households in Nocona, 32.2% had children under the age of 18 living in them. Of all households, 42.3% were married-couple households, 20.3% were households with a male householder and no spouse or partner present, and 31.0% were households with a female householder and no spouse or partner present. About 32.4% of all households were made up of individuals and 17.1% had someone living alone who was 65 years of age or older.

There were 1,431 housing units, of which 16.8% were vacant. The homeowner vacancy rate was 4.3% and the rental vacancy rate was 9.1%.

0.0% of residents lived in urban areas, while 100.0% lived in rural areas.

Racial composition as of the 2020 census
Race	Number	Percent
White	2,342	78.0%
Black or African American	18	0.6%
American Indian and Alaska Native	36	1.2%
Asian	27	0.9%
Native Hawaiian and Other Pacific Islander	0	0.0%
Some other race	228	7.6%
Two or more races	351	11.7%
Hispanic or Latino (of any race)	688	22.9%

=== 2000 census ===
As of the census of 2000, 3,198 people, 1,286 households, and 825 families resided in the city. The population density was 1,134.5 inhabitants per square mile (438.0/km^{2}). The 1,456 housing units averaged 516.5/sq mi (199.3/km^{2}). The racial makeup of the city was 93.59% White, 0.25% African American, 0.84% Native American, 0.34% Asian, 0.03% Pacific Islander, 3.31% from other races, and 1.63% from two or more races. Hispanics or Latinos of any race were 12.48% of the population.

Of the 1,286 households, 31.5% had children under the age of 18 living with them, 48.1% were married couples living together, 12.1% had a female householder with no husband present, and 35.8% were no t families. About 33.5% of all households were made up of individuals, and 19.8% had someone living alone who was 65 years of age or older. The average household size was 2.39 and the average family size was 3.04.

In the city, the population was distributed as 26.6% under the age of 18, 7.2% from 18 to 24, 25.3% from 25 to 44, 19.2% from 45 to 64, and 21.7% who were 65 years of age or older. The median age was 38 years. For every 100 females, there were 83.6 males. For every 100 females age 18 and over, there were 80.8 males.

The median income for a household in the city was $28,893, and for a family was $35,000. Males had a median income of $24,868 versus $16,500 for females. The per capita income for the city was $14,080. About 10.6% of families and 16.9% of the population were below the poverty line, including 23.3% of those under age 18 and 15.9% of those age 65 or over.

== Education ==
The City of Nocona is served by the Nocona Independent School District. Nocona High School's mascot is the Indians and the Braves.

== Notable people ==
- Jack Crain, (a.k.a. "Jackrabbit") football player and Texas state representative
- Otis Dudley Duncan, sociologist
- Joe Hancock, American Quarter Horse legend. Joe Hancock foaled c. 1925
- Herman Joseph Justin, Founder of the Justin Industries.
- Enid Justin, Founder of the Nocona Boot Company and daughter of H.J. Justin, founder of Justin Boots.
- Ruth Roach (1896–1986), championship bronc rider and rodeo performer, retired to a ranch near Nocona
- Charles C. "Charlie" Robertson major league baseball player with the Chicago White Sox and others

== Transportation ==
- U.S. Highway 82 East–West: Georgia to New Mexico
- FM 103 North–South: Nocona to Spanish Fort
- FM 1759 East–West: Nocona to northwestern Montague County
- FM 1956 East–West: Nocona to Capps Corner
