= Mack White =

American cartoonist

- The cover of While's Villa of the Mysteries, parodying Howdy Doody
- Born: December 20, 1952; Mineral Wells, Texas, U.S.
- Occupation: Comics writer and artist

Mack White (born December 20, 1952) is a comics writer and artist who lives in Texas.

== Biography ==
White grew up in North Texas where his father published weekly newspapers in small towns in the Dallas-Fort Worth area, primarily Arlington and Mansfield. He graduated from Cleburne High School in 1971, then attended Tarrant County Junior College in Fort Worth until 1972. In 1977 he moved to Austin and enrolled as a psychology major in The University of Texas at Austin. He graduated in 1982. White began creating and self-publishing comics in the 1980s.He was a contributor to the literary free magazine The Black Dog published in Austin, Texas in the late eighties. His first professionally published story was "El Bandito Muerto" which appeared in Rip Off Comix in 1990. Throughout the 1990s, he contributed to a number of comics anthologies (most notably Zero Zero, Buzz and Snake Eyes), magazines (Details, Heavy Metal, Boing Boing, and others), and newspapers (Austin Chronicle and Austin American-Statesman). His books include: The Mutant Book of the Dead (Starhead Comics, 1994); Villa of the Mysteries (a limited series published by Fantagraphics, 1996–98); and The Bush Junta (Fantagraphics, 2004), a political comics anthology which he co-edited with Gary Groth. White's artwork was featured in the Comics on the Verge art show which was presented by the Yerba Buena Arts Center in 2003 and later toured galleries and universities throughout the United States. In addition to his comics work, White is co-host (with SMiles Lewis) of the Internet radio talk show PsiOp Radio which is carried on iTunes and elsewhere on the Internet. White was featured in the 1995 documentary Day 51: The True Story of Waco and in 2010 acted in the independent film Bozoland; in 2012, he played the lead role in the short film A Second Coming.

White's early stories were bizarre, darkly humorous, and dealt with metaphysical themes. The Baltimore City Paper described his work as combining "an illustrative style reminiscent of serial adventure comic strips with the paranoia of Robert Anton Wilson's The Illuminatus! Trilogy." Later, his work became more political, the best known examples being "Dead Silence in the Brain: The CIA Assassination of John Lennon" (The Comics Journal Summer Special 2001); "Operation Northwoods" (The Comics Journal Winter Special 2002); "1963," an autobiographical account of growing up in the Dallas area during the Kennedy assassination, which appeared in Roadstrips (Chronicle Books, 2006); and the aforementioned book The Bush Junta, in which White and 25 other cartoonists told the history of the George H. W. Bush and George W. Bush presidential administrations in comic strip form. White has also worked in the Western genre, one example being his story "Trouble in Tascosa," which appeared in Hotwire 2 (Fantagraphics, 2008). In 2011, White collaborated with author Mike Kearby on Texas Tales Illustrated: The Revolution, a graphic novel about the Texas Revolution (Texas Christian University Press). In 2015, White and Kearby published a second volume of Texas Tales Illustrated: The Trail Drives.

== Awards ==
2012, Will Rogers Medallion Award in the Young Readers category for Texas Tales Illustrated: The Revolution.

2016, National Cowboy Museum Western Heritage Award in the Juvenile category for Texas Tales Illustrated: The Trail Drives.

2017, San Antonio Conservation Society Award in the Children's Book category for Texas Tales Illustrated: The Trail Drives.
