= High Noon Western Americana =

American retailer and auction consulting company

High Noon
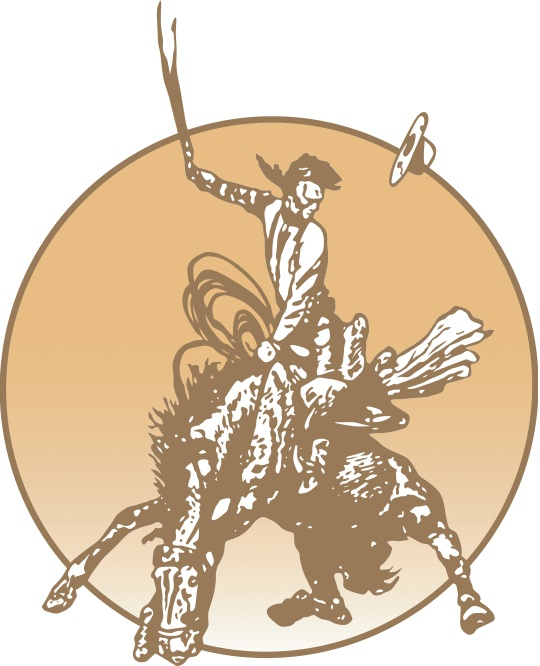
- Type: Private
- Industry: Auctioneering, Specialty Retail
- Founded: Los Angeles (1988)
- Founder: Joseph Sherwood and Linda Kohn Sherwood
- Products: Visual art, Antiques, Memorabilia
- Website: http://www.highnoon.com/

High Noon is a retailer, and auction consulting company. They specialize in Western American art & antique Americana, including cowboy and American Indian artifacts and western art. The company is known for founding the High Noon Western Americana Auction and Antique Show in 1991, which is held every January at the Phoenix Mesa Marriott in Mesa, Arizona.

Joseph Sherwood and Linda Kohn Sherwood own and operate the company, based in Los Angeles.

== History ==
High Noon Western Americana was established in 1988 to preserve and promote works of art featuring cowboys, Native Americans, and vaqueros for American western lifestyle and art enthusiasts.

To showcase its specialty in art and to provide a venue for similar collectors and vendors, the auction house began hosting a gathering for collectors consisting of an antique show and auction in 1991. In 2014, High Noon celebrated its 24th anniversary of the combined events. The festival catered to both high-end and casual art collectors.

Its sales often include historical western pieces. In 2010, the company auctioned a saddle belonging to Emperor Maximilian I of Mexico, circa 1860s, for $230,000, and another saddle in 2012 belonging to Pancho Villa for over $700,000. The 2013 auction featured a saddle belonging to Simón Bolívar. Auctions also frequently emphasize American Indian art. A Blackfeet tomahawk and a Kiowa beaded cradle combined were auctioned for $56,300 in 2011. In 2014, High Noon Western Americana set a record for a pair of spurs sold at auction for $153,400. The spurs were made by Jesus Tapia of Los Angeles, California in the early 1920s.

The company also specializes in Hollywood cowboy memorabilia. In 2010, an auction attendee purchased a Roy Rogers belt buckle for $69,000. Later that year, High Noon partnered with Christie’s of New York City to sell the complete collection of the Roy Rogers Museum. Collectors of traditional visual art have acquired pieces including Will James’ Oil Painting, “Wild Horses,” selling for $149,500 in 2011, and Charlie Dye’s “Long Horn Trail,” auctioned in 2013. In 2014, High Noon sold a .45 Colt single action Army revolver used by James Arness on the TV show Gunsmoke for over $50,000.

Items accessible to a wider group of western aficionados have included antique curiosities such as state brand books and lawman badges, vintage items such as rodeo posters and gambling relics, and handcrafted collectables such as jewelry, cowboy boots, spurs, and pictorial vests.

== Product ==
High Noon Western Americana offers a wide range of western-themed art. It features items in categories ranging from visual art, antiques, and memorabilia to furnishings and clothing.

It also offers appraisal and auction consultation services to clients in public and private sectors. It has served as an acquisition agent for the western collections of several affiliated museums.

== Awards and recognition ==
- Phoenix New Times, “Best Place to Buy Western Memorabilia,” 2006.
- VisitMesa.com, “Most Popular Western Americana Gathering in the Country.”
- Cowboys & Indians Magazine, “The Nation's Leading Western Show and Sale Event.”
- Maverick Style, a place to “Fulfill Your Cowboy and Cowgirl Dreams.”
