= Marshal Scotty's Playland Park =

Former American amusement park

- Previously known as Frasier's Frontier
- Interactive map of Marshal Scotty's Playland Park
- Location: El Cajon, California, U.S.
- Coordinates: 32.842267°N 116.884072°W
- Status: Defunct
- Opened: 1967
- Closed: 1998
- Slogan: "You'll never want to leave!"
- Operating season: Year round

Attractions
- Roller coasters: 1
- Water rides: 1

Marshal Scotty's Playland Park is an abandoned theme park in El Cajon, California. The park contained multiple attractions, such as a railroad, a 20 ft (6.1 m) Ferris wheel, a water slide, a small roller coaster, and a tilt-a-whirl ride.

The park is privately owned and is now mostly abandoned and fenced off. In 2017, numerous relics were still visible from the road, through overgrown vegetation. Starting in 2015, the park now opens every Friday and Saturday in October as a "Haunted Amusement Park" and scare trail.
