= Juni Fisher =

American singer-songwriter

Juni Fisher (born c. 1956) is a western and folk singer-songwriter.

She has received ten awards from the Western Music Association: the Crescendo Award (2005), Female Performer of the Year (2006, 2009, 2011), Song of the Year (2007, 2011, 2013), Songwriter of the Year (2008) and Album of the Year (2009)and Entertainer of the Year (2011). In addition, the Academy of Western Artists named her Female Performer of the Year in 2005. The National Cowboy Museum awarded Fisher with the coveted Western Heritage "Wrangler Award" in 2009 for Most Outstanding Western Album, making her the first female recipient of that award in the history of the National Cowboy Museum's awards. True West Magazine named her the Most Outstanding Solo Artist of 2012. She was awarded the Western Writers of America Song of the Year in 2014 award for a song she co-wrote with Cowboy Poet Waddie Mitchell.

== Biography ==
Fisher was originally from a farming family in Strathmore, California. Her father was the late Howard Fisher; her mother, Ophelia "Buzz" Fisher, still runs the farm that grows oranges for Sunkist. Juni Fisher now lives in Franklin, Tennessee, to where she moved in 1991.

She began singing while in elementary school, in a trio with her sisters. She started playing guitar at age seven and wrote her first song at age eight. She graduated from Strathmore High School and College of the Sequoias.

She has the highest regard for the Western ballad, which she has described as "a pure form of American folk music". Her musical influences early on included Marty Robbins, Joan Baez and Burl Ives.

She enjoys fly fishing, and riding cutting and reined cow horses in her spare time.
