= Nocona Airport =

- IATA: none; ICAO: none; FAA LID: F48

Summary
- Airport type: CLOSED
- Owner: City of Nocona
- Serves: Nocona, Texas
- Elevation AMSL: 905 ft / 276 m
- Coordinates: 33°46′26″N 097°44′17″W

Map
- Nocona Airport

Runways
Direction	Length		Surface
Direction	ft	m	Surface
14/32	3,200	975	Aspahlt

Statistics (2004)
- Aircraft operations: 100
- Source: Federal Aviation Administration

Nocona Airport (FAA LID: F48) was a public use airport located one nautical mile (2 km) southwest of the central business district of Nocona, a city in Montague County, Texas, United States. It was owned by the City of Nocona.

== Facilities and aircraft ==
Nocona Airport covered an area of 68 acres (28 ha) at an elevation of 905 feet (276 m) above mean sea level. It had one runway designated 14/32 with an asphalt surface measuring 3,200 by 50 feet (975 x 15 m).

For the 12-month period ending August 4, 2004, the airport had 100 general aviation aircraft operations.
