= Dave Thornbury =

American trick roper and saddle maker (born 1948)

David Thornbury (born in 1948) is an American trick roper and saddle maker.

== Career ==
Thornbury was born in 1948 and started lassoing at the age three, and stated there were "No computer games, no TV, no electronics — just the rope I grew up on." His father, J.D., was a trick horse rider who raised him traveling from rodeo to rodeo as his family performed on a Midwest circuit.

As an adult, Thornbury first learned saddlery in Michigan but fine-tuned his art and tooling skills later from a Pima saddler named Mervyn Ringlero. Thornbury moved to California in the 1970s and became popular worldwide for his saddles and leather goods that included work for stuntmen in Hollywood. Thornbury continued in the rodeo as a Bronc rider, and at one point, was hired to model for Marlboro Man ads.

== Personal life ==
Thornbury lives in Agoura Hills. He is a regular performer with his lasso at the Santa Clarita Cowboy Festival.
