= Canadian Cowboy Country Magazine =

Canadian Western culture and lifestyle magazine

Canadian Cowboy Country
- Editor: Terri L. Mason
- Categories: Western Lifestyle Culture
- Frequency: Six times a year
- Circulation: 49,000+
- Publisher: Rob Tanner
- First issue: March/April 1997
- Company: Tanner Young Publishing Group
- Country: Canada
- Based in: Edmonton, Alberta
- Language: English
- Website: Canadian Cowboy Country

Canadian Cowboy Country is a Canadian magazine of Western culture and lifestyle. It is published by Rob Tanner. The publication was founded in 1997. The magazine was purchased by Tanner Young Publishing Group in 2001. Editorial offices are located in Edmonton, Alberta, Canada.
