= Joey Rocketshoes Dillon =

American singer

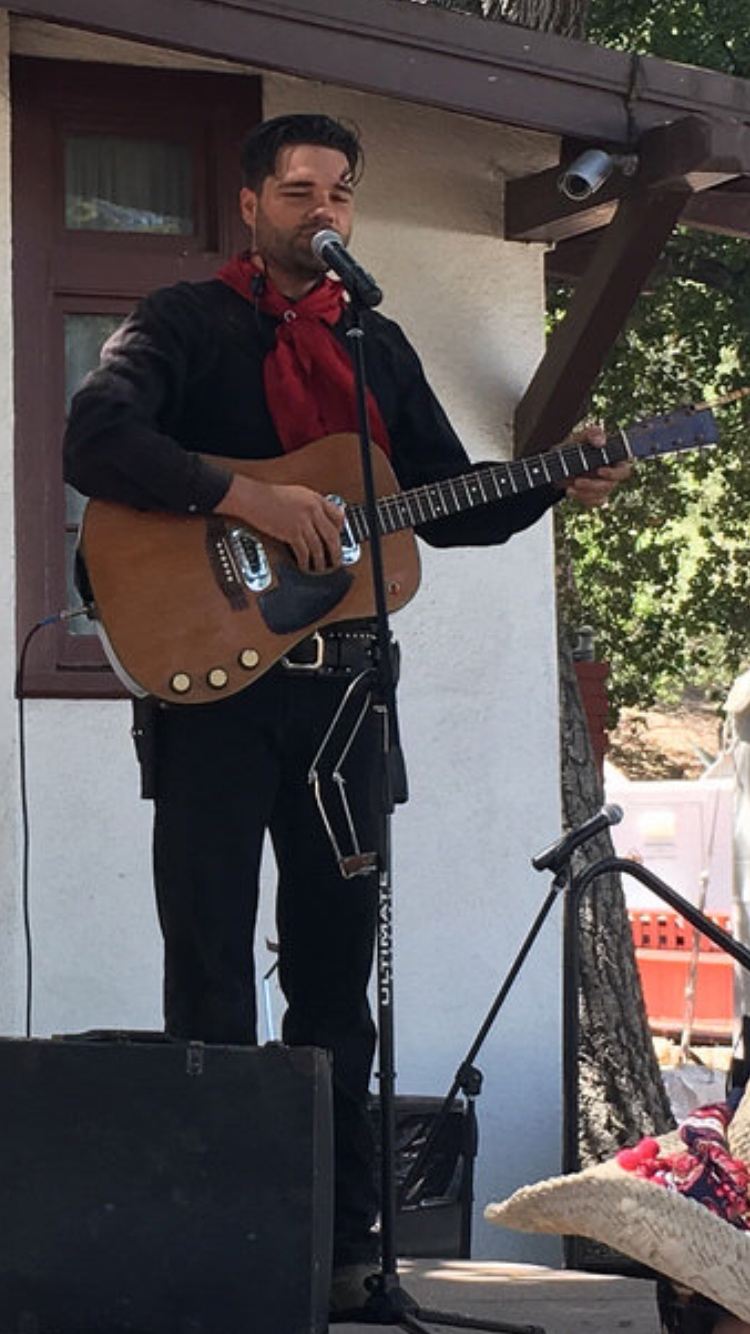
- Joey Rocketshoes Dillon

Background information
- Born: Lake Forest, Illinois, U.S.
- Genres: western music
- Occupations: Gunslinger, Hollywood Gun Trainer, actor, musician, comedian, songwriter
- Instruments: Guitar, vocals
- Website: www.joeydillon.com

Joey Rocketshoes Dillon is an armorer in the film industry, expert handler and trick showman of Western firearms, historian, production consultant, and singer-songwriter. Notably he is a three time world champion gunslinger.

== Early life ==
Born in Lake Forest near Chicago, Dillon's family moved to Lake Don Pedro, California where he states he had the Western influence around him with learning how to ride horses and shoot guns with his father. Performing tricks first came with cap guns. "When I was young, I had a wooden and metal pirate pistol from Disneyland," he said. "It was so easy to spin back and forth, I'd go to sleep at night twirling it around my hand. We're all blessed with certain talents -- I'm not good at everything, but this (gun-spinning) is something I can do well." Once he mastered these he moved on to unloaded real guns. After high school, he moved to Chicago in hopes of becoming a comedian and actor. He took classes with The Second City with a mind to someday be part of Saturday Night Live. While there he honed his comedic talents as a standup at open mic nights. In his early twenties Dillon relocated to Union, Illinois he happened to move next door to Donley's Wild West Town and presented to the management his unique ability as a gunslinger. He quickly landed a position as a part time entertainer, to which Dillon recalled: "I'd have a little portable stereo on a picnic table, I'd hit play on a Western-sounding song, and I'd sit there and spin guns."

By the age of 22, he became a world champion gunslinger. Eventually moving to screen work.

== Career ==
Dillon has worked as an Armorer and Gun Coach for Hollywood films while also appearing himself as an actor in both movie and television series of typically a Western genre.

== Filmography ==
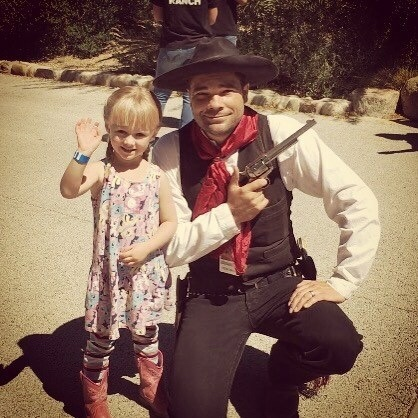
Joey Dillon with a fan

He has been an Armorer and Gun Coach on such films as "The Ballad of Buster Scruggs," "Deadwood the Movie," "Godless," "The Harder They Fall," "The Highwaymen," HBO's "Westworld," and many more.

== Personal life ==
Dillon also works on the side restoring and refabricating vintage cars, bikes, movie props, guns and other objects.
