= Stock tank =

Drinking water tank for animals

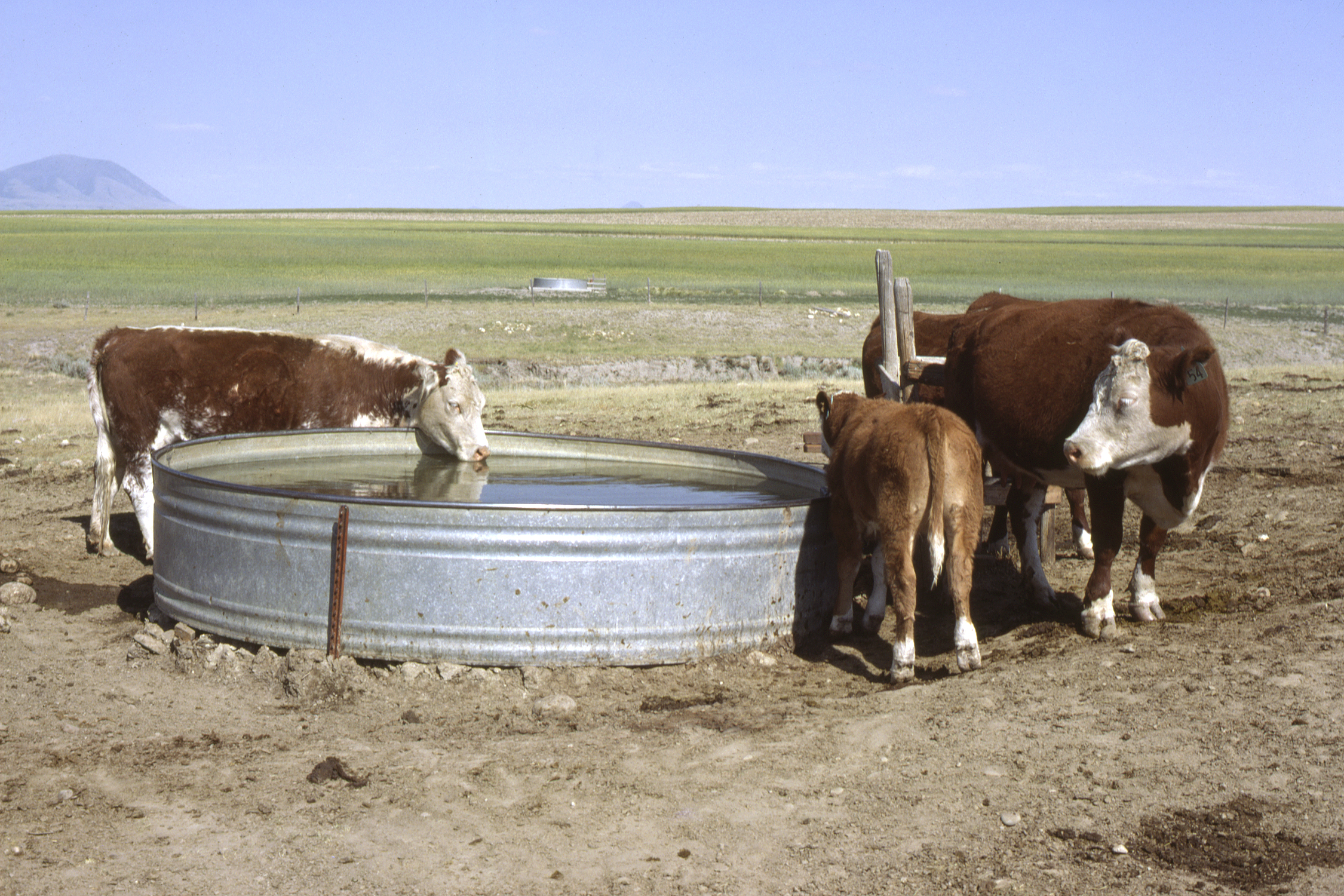
Cows at a stock tank with piped water

A stock tank is used to provide drinking water for animals such as cattle or horses. Stock tanks can range in size from 100 liters to over 5500 liters (30 to 1500 gallons) and typically are made of galvanized steel. Some are made of sturdy polymers. Some have wheels to make them easy to move around (they can be towed as trailers by a tractor or a truck). In some parts of Texas, ranchers refer to ponds and watering holes as stock tanks.

Such tanks are refilled in various ways. Often refilling is by a pump (e.g., windpump, electric pump), a creek, or a spring. Other stock tanks rely on runoff water from rain or melting snow, or from water hauled to them in a tank truck or tank trailer.

== Trick tank ==
A trick tank is type of stock tank. It collects precipitation, holds the water in a covered tank to minimize evaporation and maintain adequate water quality, and dispenses water on demand into a basin from which animals can drink. Dispensing may be regulated by a mechanical float device similar to a ballcock in the tank of a flush toilet. Trick tanks are manufactured in several styles, including inverted umbrella and apron. They are heavy and often are used in remote wilderness locations, to which they may require delivery via helicopter.

To provide water to wild animals, not livestock, fencing may be built to surround a trick tank. Fences serve to exclude cattle and sheep. Trick tanks are widely used in the southwest United States, where periodic droughts may cause population crashes in game animals unless water supplies are provided.

== Other uses ==
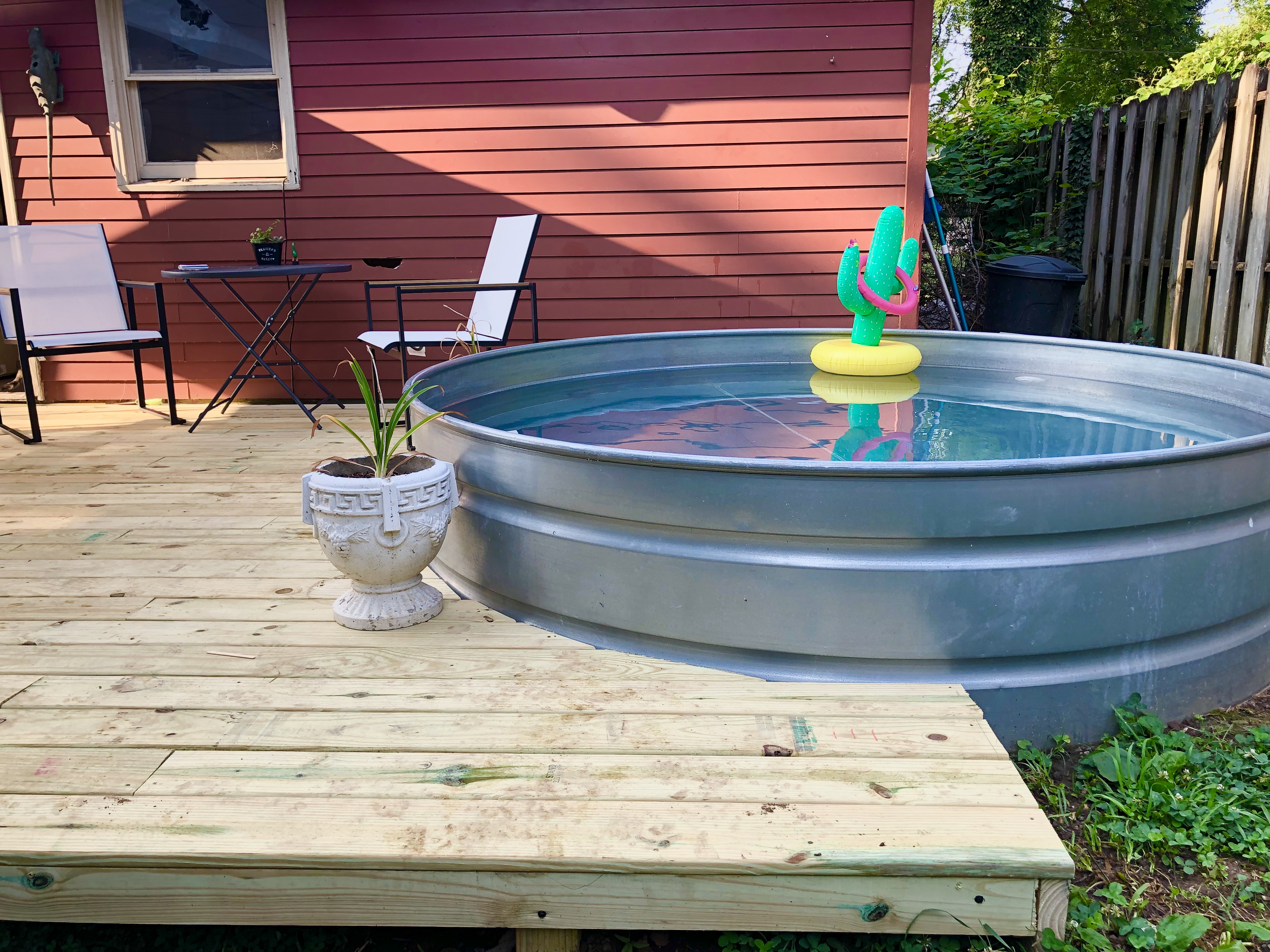
Stock tanks can be repurposed as backyard pools, or "stock tank pools," using chlorine tabs and a filter pump

Stock tanks are increasingly used as "rustic" backyard above-ground pools, or "stock tank pools" by retrofitting a filter pump and adding chlorine or stabilized hydrogen peroxide to keep the water clean throughout the summer. The water will need to be drained periodically and can be reused to water plants if hydrogen peroxide is used. Metal stock tanks have also been used as a cheap alternative for a hot tub. Various heating methods are possible, including use of a propane heater or submersible wood stove.

Another use of a stock tank is at a fair or other event where they are filled with ice to keep canned and bottled beverages, or even perishables such as watermelons. A cowboy church commonly uses a stock tank for water baptisms.

Stock tanks can also make perfect indoor habitats for aquatic pets, such as fish, turtles or frogs. Tackle shops are known to store minnows for fishing in them.
