= Cowboyland =

Amusement park located in Voghera

Coordinates: 44°58′07″N 9°00′47″E

- Previously known as Cowboys' Guest Ranch
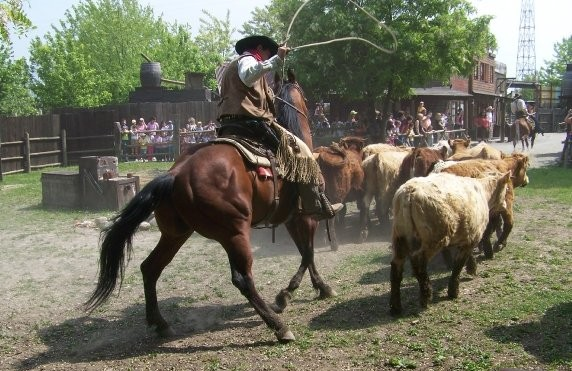
- Interactive map of Cowboyland
- Location: Cowboys' Guest Ranch, Voghera, Lombardy, Italy
- Status: Operating
- Opened: June 3, 1995
- Theme: Western
- Slogan: L'avventura del Far West ha inizio (The Far West adventure starts)
- Operating season: Year-round
- Area: 5 ha (12 acres)

Attractions
- Roller coasters: 1
- Water rides: 1
- Website: Official site

Cowboyland is a Western-themed amusement park in a Voghera, Lombardy, in the northern Italy.

It's the first and only western-themed park in Italy.

After the park's activities started, the city of Voghera got a twin-cityhood with Cheyenne, Wyoming.

== History ==
The Cowboys' Guest Ranch was officially opened on 3 June 1995. In 2001, the Cowboyland amusement park was created inside the ranch.

The themed park was enlarged in 2006, with a new family roller coaster and new western-themed set created by Emilio Banfi (who set also other Italian parks like Gardaland and Mirabilandia). They also host live western shows.

== Description ==
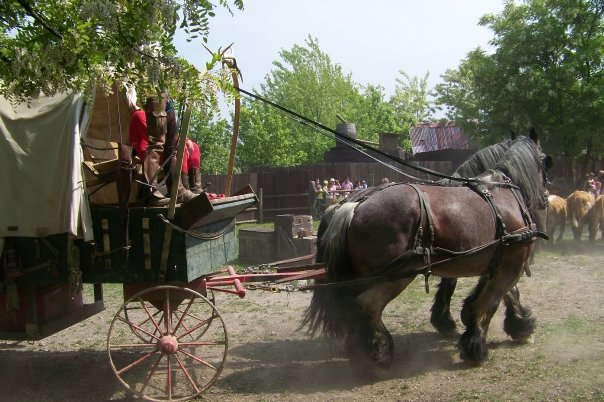
Western show

The entertainment area is spread over an area of approximately 35,000 m^{2}, next to the Cowboys' Guest Ranch, with picnic areas and various American frontier-style attractions designed for children.

The park is part of the Cowboys' Guest Ranch, an area of about 50,000 square meters equipped with a number of typical animals of the wild west, including dozens of horses, ponies, twenty bulls, skunks, prairie dogs, and others.

Inside the village of "Cowboy town", built by western sets, there is a 2,400 m^{2} indoor arena (PalaTexas), with 1,420 seats used for a rodeo and Wild West Show. Inside the PalaTexas are competitions and races of the Italian and European Championship of American rodeo, and cutting.

The park also hosts a Western saloon, an American restaurant, a shop and a western-themed hotel.

== Attractions ==
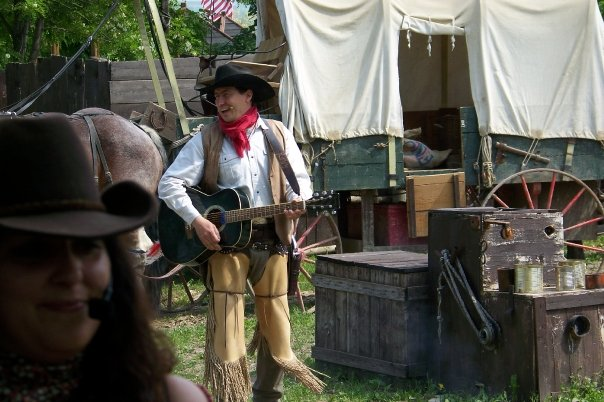
Western music show

The main attractions of Cowboyland are:

- American Rodeo: American rodeo show;
- Cattle Drive and Camp Wagon: cattle show and food serving in the Chuck Wagon;
- Cow Town: the little frontier town;
- Cowboyland Railroad: travelling on a western-style train;
- Cowbus: panoramic tour on a special vehicle, half tractor and half cow;
- First Emotion: horse riding school;
- Fort Alamo: children playground;
- Goat Scramble: visiting the park's goats;
- Gold Mine Train: a family roller coaster set in an old abandoned gold mine;
- Indian River: native-style river trip on canoes and tree-boats;
- Indian Village: visiting native tipis;
- Lazo Stage: the lasso school;
- Old West Game: launch-the-chicken game, horseshoes tossing, and can shooting;
- Pony Ride: children riding school with ponies;
- Ranch Animal Tour: visiting the animals hosted in the park: bisons, raccoons, fallow deers, cattle, goats, sheep, horses, ponies, and many others;
- Stable Tour: visiting the horse stables;
- Wyoming Ranger Quad Station: quad bike circuit;
- Wyoming Stage: Mr Fantasy show and country line dancing show.

== See also ==
- Voghera
- Oltrepò Pavese
