= Enid Justin =

American businesswoman (1893–1990)

Enid Justin (1893–1990), a native of Montague County, Texas, founded the Nocona Boot Company in the small community of Nocona.

== Family life ==
Enid Justin married Julius Stelzer in 1915; the couple had a child in 1916. The baby girl, Anna Jo, died in 1918, the same year that Enid's father died. Enid and Julius divorced in 1934. In 1940, she married Harry Whitman, and they divorced in 1945.

== Nocona Boot Company ==
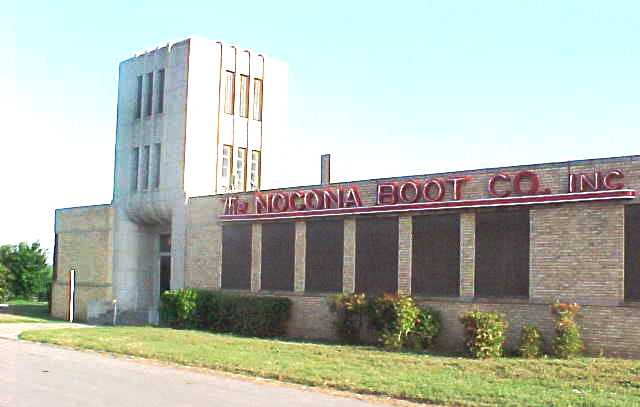
The Nocona Boot Company

Her father was the famed boot-maker Herman Joseph Justin, who cobbled his first pair of boots while working in a Texas barber shop. A student of the boot-making craft herself, Enid opened the Nocona Boot Company in 1925 after her brothers, John, Sr., Avis, and Earl, decided to move her father's business to Fort Worth, Texas.

I designed my first pair of boots when I was 14; I got the idea for the pattern from a velvet-brocaded couch.--Enid Justin at the National Cowgirl Museum and Hall of Fame

Enid Justin launched her company with employees from her father's business. Her husband, Julius, served as president, and Enid worked many jobs including shipping clerk, bill collector, and salesperson. The discovery of oil in Nocona's North Field in 1926 brought new business to the bootmakers, who supplied lace-up boots to oil field workers. The company prospered, even during the Great Depression and World War II period and moved to a new 30,000 sq ft (2,800 m^{2}). facility on U.S. Route 82 in 1947.

Nocona Boot Company became one of the top five boot-makers in the country as a result of Justin's intrepid work ethic, diligence, and devotion to her employees. The company expanded in the late 1970s and early 1980, having opened factories in Vernon and Gainesville, Texas.

In 1981, Enid Justin merged the company with her brothers' Justin Industries. Throughout the 1980s, she continued to devote her energies to civic actions and causes. She donated to expand the Nocona City Park and to underwrite both boys' and girls' Little League programs. On October 14, 1990, Enid Justin died in Nocona at the age of ninety-six.

In 1999, Justin Industries closed the Nocona Boot Company plant in Nocona and consolidated all boot-making at El Paso, Texas, and Cassville, Missouri, thus ending more than a century of quality boot-making in Nocona.

An exhibit at the National Cowgirl Museum and Hall of Fame in Fort Worth honors Justin's contribution to the boot-making industry.
