= Ryan Jarrett =

American tie-down roper (born 1983)

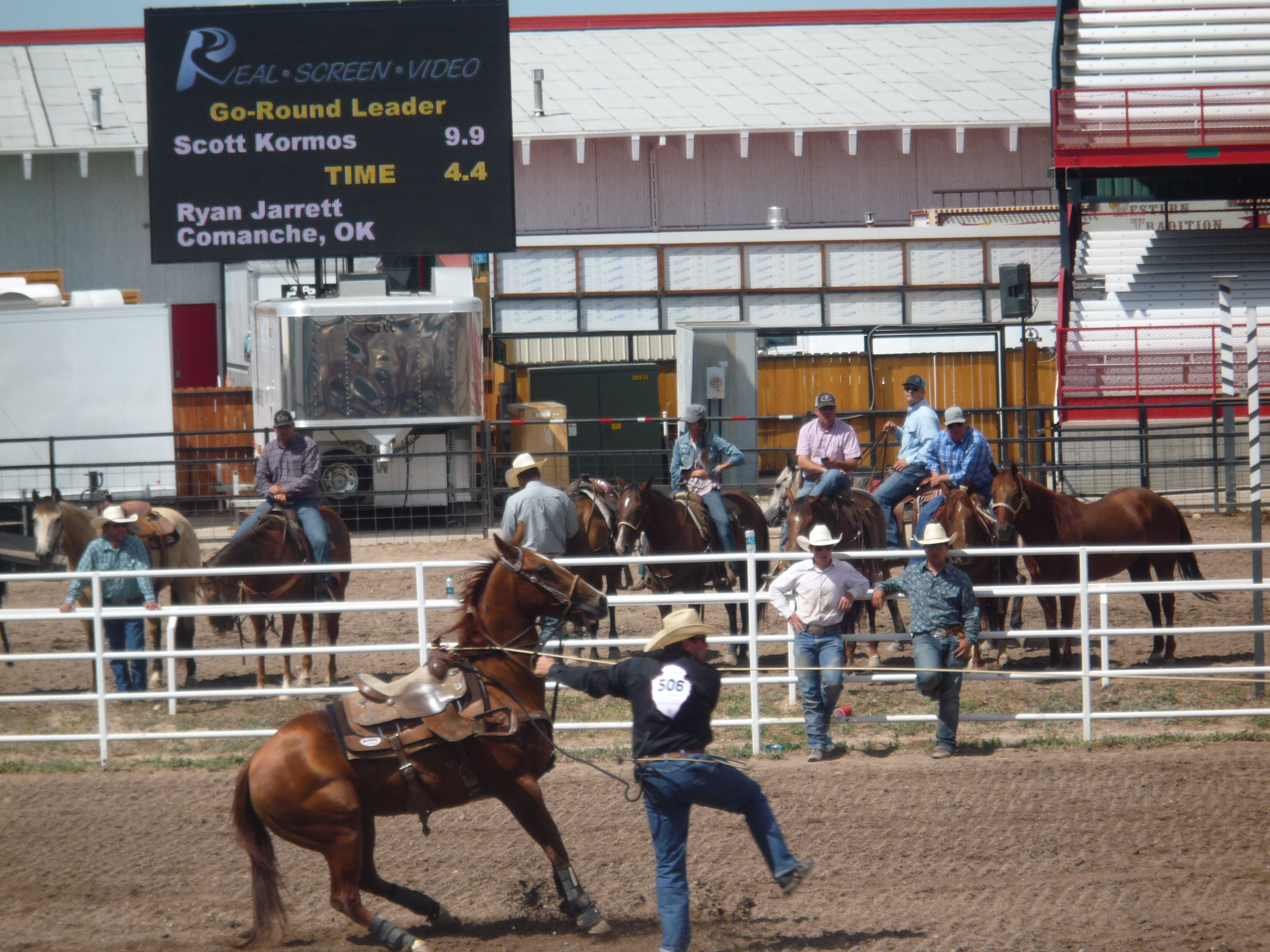
- Jarrett at 2017 Cheyenne Frontier Days
- Born: December 28, 1983 (age 41); Summerville, Georgia, United States
- Occupations: Cowboy, tie-down roper

Ryan Jarrett (born December 28, 1983), is an American professional rodeo cowboy who specializes in tie-down roping and competes in the Professional Rodeo Cowboys Association (PRCA) circuit. At the 2005 National Finals Rodeo (NFR), he won the PRCA All-Around world championship. He competed in steer wrestling, tie-down roping, and team roping during the season and at the NFR to win the title.

He was inducted into the Rodeo Hall of Fame of the National Cowboy and Western Heritage Museum in 2010.
