= Mike Kearby =

American novelist and inventor (born 1952)

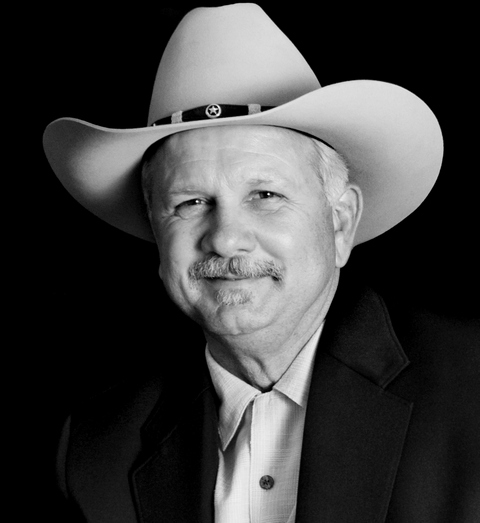

Mike Kearby (born 1952) is an American novelist and inventor. Since 2005, Kearby has published twelve novels and two graphic novels.

== Biography ==
Kearby was born in Mineral Wells, Texas, and received a B.S. from North Texas State University (now the University of North Texas) in 1972. He worked in the irrigation industry for 20 years where he obtained patents 5,762,270, 5,992,760, 6,478,237, 6,155,493, 6,209,801. He taught high school English and reading for 10 years and created "The Collaborative Novella Project". The project allows future authors to go through the novel writing process from idea to published work. Kearby began novel writing in 2005 and has completed twelve novels, two graphic novels, and written the afterword to the TCU Press 2010 release of western novelist's, Elmer Kelton, The Far Away Canyon.

Ambush at Mustang Canyon was a finalist for the 2008 Spur Awards.

A Hundred Miles to Water was awarded the 2011 Will Rogers Medallion Award for Best Adult Fiction.

Texas Tales Illustrated: The Texas Revolution was awarded the 2012 Will Rogers Medallion for Best YA Non-Fiction.

Men of Color was awarded Best Script / Winner from the Hill Country Film Festival, The Los Angeles Movie Awards, and The Indie Gathering Film Festival.

Long Term Parking produced in 2013.

Kearby was presented a Western Heritage award in 2016 from the National Cowboy Museum for Texas Tales Illustrated: The Trail Drives.

The Problem with Time Travel was Grand Prize Winner at Table Read My Screenplay Austin in 2019.

The Problem with Time Travel was Grand Prize Winner at the HollyShorts Film Festival in 2020.

The Problem with Time Travel had its premiere in Hollywood at the TL Chinese Theaters in August 2022.

== Bibliography ==
=== Western novels ===
- The Road to a Hanging (2006)
- Ride the Desperate Trail (2007)
- Ambush at Mustang Canyon (2007), 2008 Spur Award Finalist
- The Last Renegade (2009)
- The Taken (2010)
- A Hundred Miles to Water (2010), 2011 Will Rogers Medallion Award for Best Adult Fiction
- Dead Man's Saddle (2011)

=== Science fiction ===
- The 13th Baktun (2008)
- Men of Color (2012)

=== Horror ===
- The Resonance (2011)
- The Devouring~Kavachi's Rise (2012)

=== Graphic novels ===
- Texas Tales Illustrated: The Revolution (April, 2011), illustrations by: Mack White
- Texas Tales Illustrated: The Trail Drives (Feb, 2015), illustrations by: Mack White

=== Afterward ===
- The Far Canyon (2010), Kearby wrote the Afterword for the Elmer Kelton TCU Press reprint

=== Screenplays ===
- Long Term Parking (2012) Co-written with Paul Bright
- Men of Color (2012)
- The Problem with Time Travel (2019)
