= Benny Reynolds =

American rodeo performer (1936–2014)

Benny Reynolds (March 5, 1936 – February 14, 2014) was an American rodeo champion. Born in Twin Bridges, Montana, he was of English descent. Both his mother and father rode saddle broncs and his brothers also competed in rodeo.

Reynolds entered his first rodeo in Butte, Montana at age six, but did not compete seriously until 15. He went professional and joined the Rodeo Cowboys Association (now the Professional Rodeo Cowboys Association) in 1956. He went on to win 1958 RCA Rookie of the Year Award, competing in saddle bronc riding, bareback bronc riding, bull riding and steer wrestling.

Reynolds was a guest contestant on the CBS-TV quiz show, Name That Tune in the late 1950s. While endorsing Wrangler Jeans and Tony Lama Boots, print advertising featuring Reynolds appeared regularly in such publications as Rodeo Sports News and The Western Horseman.

His most successful year in rodeo was 1961, when he won the World All Around Champion Cowboy title, $31,309, "a saddle, a silver buckle, silver spurs and a life size fiberglass horse". In 1966, he was the winner of the Linderman Award, "given to the contestant earning the most money in a combination of three or more rough stock and timed events".

In 1993, Reynolds was inducted into the ProRodeo Hall of Fame in Colorado Springs, Colorado, for his accomplishments in all-around multiple rodeo event competition. In later life, he ranched and put up fencing in the mountains. Reynolds died of a heart attack on February 14, 2014, at his ranch in Dillon, Montana. He was 77.

== Honors ==
- 1961 Rodeo Hall of Fame of the National Cowboy and Western Heritage Museum
- 1993 ProRodeo Hall of Fame
- 1996 National Senior Professional Rodeo Hall of Fame
- Montana Pro Rodeo Hall and Wall of Fame
