= Cowboys & Indians (magazine) =

American lifestyle magazine

- Editor: Jeremy Reed
- Categories: Western; Lifestyle
- Frequency: Six times a year
- Publisher: Teton Ridge
- First issue: July 1992; 34 years ago
- Company: Teton Ridge
- Country: United States
- Based in: Fort Worth, Texas
- Language: English
- Website: www.cowboysindians.com
- ISSN: 1069-8876

Cowboys & Indians is an American magazine that focuses on Western and Native American lifestyles. It was founded by former high-tech and defense manufacturing entrepreneur Robert Hartman. Hartman's family were originally ranchers from Cody, Wyoming, and his grandmother was close friends with Wyatt Earp and Wyatt's wife Josephine. When Hartman's family moved to Los Angeles in the early 1920s, Josephine and Wyatt soon followed. Hartman's parents purchased a ranch in the San Fernando Valley where he was raised.

With a family history steeped in Western ranching, Hartman recognized that the modern Western lifestyle did not bridge the past to the present. This inspired the idea of creating a glossy storytelling magazine, and Hartman began formulating the substance of the publication in 1991, in an effort to combine the history and stories of the American West with art, Western antiques, ranching, real estate, fashion, and travel.

In July 1993, the first issue was published with 12,000 copies printed. The first issue became a highly collected issue followed by a growing circulation that was distributed through subscription, airports, and over 17,000 locations in the United States and a number of foreign countries.

In 1996, Hartman was approached to sell the publication. Following that sale, the publication was sold a second time to Publisher Gregory L. Brown. Editorial offices were located in Dallas.

In November of 2024, Teton Ridge acquired Cowboys & Indians (C&I) magazine along with the Cowboy Channel and other assets. C&I has a circulation of 150,000 as audited by the Alliance for Audited Media (AAM). Its tagline remains "The Premier Magazine of the West." Recent cover stories include Billy Bob Thorton, Naiomi Glasses and Robert Redford.
