= Fisher Poets Gathering =

Annual poetry event in Astoria, Oregon, U.S.

The Fisher Poets Gathering (FPG; sometimes styled as FisherPoets Gathering) is an annual event held on the last weekend of February in Astoria, Oregon, where men and women with ties to the fishing industry get together to share their poems, tales, and songs in celebration of the lifestyle and its people. Begun in 1998 with a small gathering of far-flung friends meeting in a pub and sharing their poetry, the FPG has greatly expanded and now attracts around 100 artists and up to a couple thousand audience members, filling multiple venues and spanning the entire weekend. Many performers are from Astoria or other parts of the Pacific Northwest, but performers have come from all over North America and abroad. The event is publicized by local newspaper The Astorian, and the evening performances are broadcast live by local public radio station KMUN.

The Fisher Poets Gathering has been featured on the Today Show and BBC Radio, in the New York Times, Smithsonian Magazine, and the Wall Street Journal, and is the subject of a documentary film by Jen Winston called "Fisher Poets." The Library of Congress has recognized the Fisher Poets Gathering as a Local Legacy Project.

== History ==
About 200 people attended the first Fisher Poets Gathering, which was held in 1998 at the Wet Dog Café in Astoria. The initial organizer was Jon Broderick, a commercial fisherman and educator, who began organizing it in 1997 when he was inspired by Clem Starck's poetry and the cowboy poetry tradition. Other early organizers included literature professor Julie Brown, songwriter Hobe Kytr, and social sciences professor Florence Sage. Jay Speakman, a resident of the coastal town of Gearhart, Oregon, joined around 2000, and helped organize and plan the events. In 2001, Broderick traveled to Nevada to attend the National Cowboy Poetry Gathering, and there he was advised by Charlie Seeman of the Western Folklife Center.

From 1998 to 2008, the gathering was sponsored by Clatsop Community College. It has received a grant from the City of Astoria's Arts Fund for Tourism.

The 2014 Fisher Poets Gathering marked the first time a poet from outside the United States participated, when Katrina Porteous from the Northumbrian fishing village of Beadnell, England shared her poetry about the community.

The Fisher Poets Gathering was held virtually in 2021 and 2022 during the COVID-19 pandemic.

== Notable participants ==
- Katrina Porteous (born 1960)
- Clemens Starck (1937–2024)
- Ray Troll (born 1954)

== See also ==
- Fishing industry in the United States § Pacific Coast
- Working-class culture
