= Vess Quinlan =

American Cowboy Poet

Vess Quinlan is an American cowboy poet, whose work has been published in many books and magazines, as well as on various online poetry databases. His writing is based on his real life experiences as a rancher.

== Early life and education ==
Vess Quinlan was born in Eagle, Colorado on November 23, 1940, and is part of the fourth generation on both sides of his family to spend most of their lives working at raising livestock in rural Colorado. He also spent time in Pueblo.

His initial interest in poetry was sparked during a year-long bout with polio as a boy in 1951 at the age of 10 and he has been a contributor to Range Magazine since at least 1958. During his time confined to bed, he began reading and writing poetry of the Cowboy variety. At the age of 15, he ran away from home and worked as a ranch chore boy and cattle hand. Quinlan was one of the leading exponents of open form poetry in cowboy poetry, which influenced others such as Rod McQueary and Bill Jones to try open form poetry.

== Cowboy poetry conventions ==
Until the 1980s, Cowboy poetry was an underrepresented aspect of the Western Lifestyle. That changed in January 1985, when the first Cowboy Poets gathering was held in Elko, Nevada, and the genre attained broader recognition. Quinlan attended the first Elko Gathering and has often been invited to perform at gatherings that developed in other states including the National Cowboy Poetry Gathering. These conventions offer not only traditional poetry, but also cowboy music, which is not traditional country music and much more of the like.

== Personal life ==
Quinlan lives in Alamosa, Colorado and has a daughter named Lisa who is also a poet.

== See also ==
- Baxter Black
- Waddie Mitchell
