= James William Whilt =

American poet

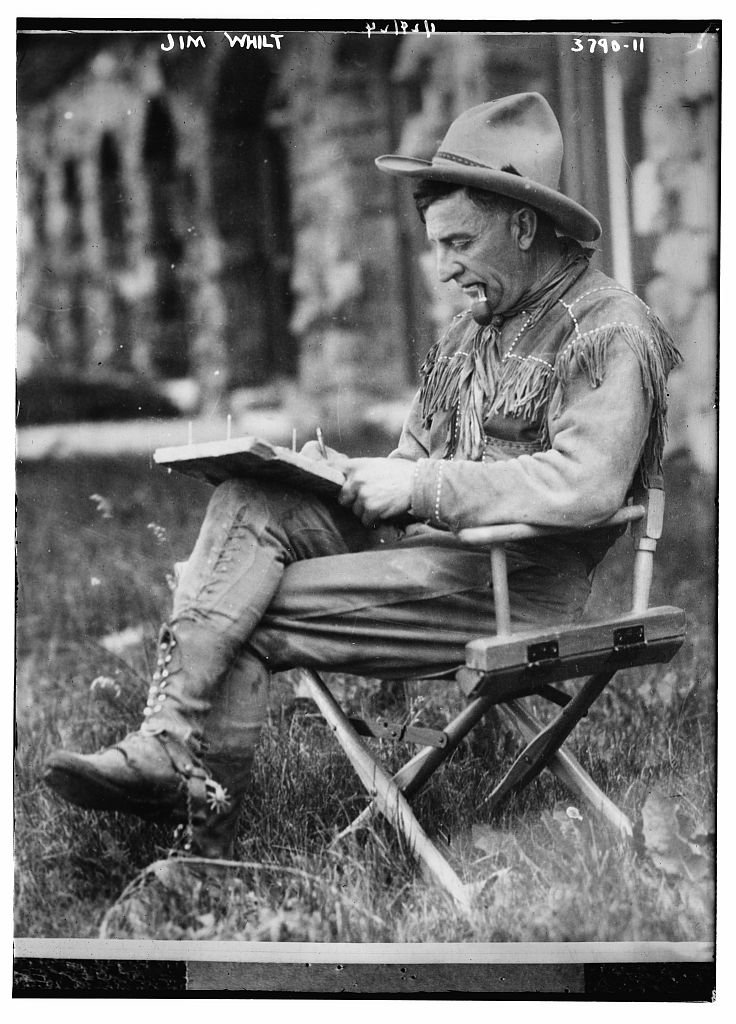
James William Whilt in 1917

James William Whilt (January 8, 1878 - March 10, 1967) was an American cowboy poet known as "The Poet of the Rockies".

== Biography ==
He was born on January 8, 1878, in Benton County, Minnesota. He moved to Fort Benton, Montana in 1900 and became a cowboy. He spent 30 years in Glacier National Park as a guide, caretaker, and trapper.

He died on March 10, 1967, in Kalispell, Montana. . He is known for the anthology of poems, " the Rhymes of the Rockies"

== Poems ==
- Ain't it the Truth?
- The Cabin of Mystery

== Publications ==
- Rhymes of the Rockies (1922)
- Our Animal Friends of the Wild (1927)
- Giggles from Glacier Guides (1935)
- Mountain Echoes (1951)

== See also ==
- Thomas Hornsby Ferril also known as "The Poet of the Rockies"
- Cy Warman (1855–1914) also known as "The Poet of the Rockies"
- Joaquin Miller (1837–1913) "The Poet of the Sierras"
- National Cowboy Poetry Gathering
