= Paul Zarzyski =

American poet

- Born: May 25, 1951 (age 75); Wisconsin, U.S.
- Education: University of Montana
- Occupation: poet

Paul Zarzyski (born 1951) is a cowboy poet and educator. He is a former bareback bronc rider.

== Biography ==
Paul Zarzyski was born on May 25, 1951, and he grew up in Hurley, Wisconsin. Zarzyski received his Master of Fine Arts degree in creative writing in the mid-1970s at the University of Montana, where he studied with Richard Hugo, Madeline DeFrees, and John Haines, and where he later taught Hugo's classes after his death.

In the same breath in which he first pursued his poetry passion, he discovered a second unexpected calling—bareback bronc riding—and competed on the amateur, ProRodeo, and Senior circuits into his early forties.

Zarzyski has performed at the annual National Cowboy Poetry Gathering in Elko, Nevada for the past 30 years. He has toured Canada, Australia, Wales, England, and Russia, has recited at the National Book, Folk, and Storytelling Festivals, at The Kennedy Center Millennium Stage and the Library of Congress, and has appeared with the Reno Philharmonic Orchestra and the Spokane Symphony. He was also featured on Garrison Keillor's A Prairie Home Companion, aired from The Mother Lode Theater in BUTTE!

The author of twelve books and chapbooks, Paul's most recent collections were published by Bozeman's Bangtail Press: Steering With My Knees: Zarzyski Lite in 2014 and, in 2011, his “triptych,” 51: 30 Poems, 20 Lyrics, 1 Self-Interview, the latter offering 120 pages of question-answer prose that traces his otherworldly journey from his 1950's and '60's, rural, Polish-Italian, blue-collar childhood in Hurley, Wisconsin to the poetic pages and stages of the American West.

Imbued with the belief that the music of poetry will, at times, blossom into song, Paul has applied his poetics to the art of the lyric and has co-written “western hits” recorded by Ian Tyson, Tom Russell, Wylie Gustafson, David Wilkie of Cowboy Celtic, Don Edwards, and other esteemed musicians. Two of these collaborations, one with Wylie and one with Tom, received the Western Writers of America Spur Award for best song of 2010 and 2011, respectively, while another of Paul's works, “Bob Dylan Bronc Song” also earned The Spur in 2010 for poetry.

In January 2016, Paul's fifth spoken-word studio recording was released, a double CD of poems, sporting the same title as his latest book, Steering With My Knees, and offering extensive, and at times “exotic,” musical compositions that include saxophone, slide/resonator guitar, didgeridoo, trumpet, trombone, fugelhorn, drums, blues harmonica, jaw harp, organ, tuba, accordion, piano, cello, banjo, theremin, etc. The project's digbook presentation was designed by Paul's long-time friend and collaborator, Missoula artist, Larry Pirnie. Two earlier recordings, Words Growing Wild (1998) and The Glorious Commotion Of It All (2004), both produced by Jim Rooney in Nashville, offer poems with accompaniment by Duane Eddy, John Hartford, and other fine musicians, while two later disks, Rock-n-Rowel and Collisions Of Reckless Love (both, 2007), were produced by Open Path Music of San Jose, California —also at the helm of the current recording project.

Paul makes his home, “where the poetry roams,” west of Great Falls with art historian and C.M. Russell scholar, Elizabeth Dear, their Aussie dog Zeke Zarzyski, horses Pecos and Lash, and numerous other soulful fellow beings who Ol’ Charlie referred to as “Nature’s People.” Religiously, Zarzyski has described himself as a leaning towards Pandeism, saying, "Agnosticism, however, doesn’t define my stance, which, if pressed, I’d say is a cross between pantheism and deism—Pandeism."

== Awards ==
- National Cowboy Hall of Fame, “Wrangler Award,” 1996
- Western Writers of America, “Spur Award,” for poetry, 2004
- Western Writers of America, “Spur Award,” for poetry, 2010
- Western Writers of America, “Spur Award,” for songwriting, with Wylie Gustafson, 2010
- Western Writers of America, “Spur Award,” for songwriting, with Tom Russell, 2011
- 2005 Montana Governor's Arts Award for Literature

== Works ==
=== Poetry collections ===
- Steering With My Knees: Zarzyski Lite (Bangtail Press, 2014)
- 51: 31 Poems, 20 Lyrics, 1 Self-Interview (Bangtail Press, 2011)
- Becoming Flight—Ltd. Ed. (Heavy Duty Press, 2004)
- Wolf Tracks On the Welcome Mat (OreanaBooks, 2003)
- Blue-Collar Light (Red Wing Press, 1998)
- All This Way For The Short Ride (Museum of N.M. Press, 1996)
- I Am Not a Cowboy (Dry Crik Press, 1995)
- The Garnet Moon—Ltd. Ed. (The Black Rock Press, 1990)
- Tracks (The Kutenai Press, 1989)
- Roughstock Sonnets (The Lowell Press, 1987)
- The Make-Up of Ice (The University of Georgia Press, 1984)
- Call Me Lucky (Confluence Press, 1981)

=== Recordings / productions / exhibits ===
- Steering With My Knees—2 CDs (Bucking Horse Moon Music, 2016)
- Collisions Of Reckless Love—CD (Open Path Music, 2006)
- Rock ‘n’ Rowel—CD (Open Path Music, 2006)
- The Glorious Commotion Of It All—CD (JRP Records, 2003)
- Words Growing Wild—CD & Cassette (JRP Records, 1999)
- Ain’t No Life After Rodeo—Cassette (Horse Sense Music, 1992)
- The Crayola Kid: The Art of Larry Pirnie
- Rodeo Poetry by Paul Zarzyski (ProRodeo Hall of Fame Exhibit, 1995)
- Small Town Triumphs & Cowboy Colors—Paul Zarzyski poetry composing act two of a two-act play written by Lance Belville (Great American History Theatre, St. Paul, MN, April–May 1992.

=== Limited-edition broadsides ===
- Tender—A 10 Woodcut-Poem Suite, including “The Meaning of Intimacy,” “Love the Color of Trout,” “The Garnet Moon,” “Grace,” “Old Sorrel Mare Turning More And More Roan,” et al. Printed on 15" by 22" Arches Paper by Theodore Waddell (Tucker Press, 2003-2004)
- For The Stories—Art by Jim McCormick (The Black Rock Press, University of Nevada, Reno, 2001)
- The Hand—Art by Jim McCormick (The Black Rock Press, University of Nevada, Reno, 1999)
- Words Growing Wild In The Woods—Art by Jim McCormick (The Black Rock Press, University of Nevada, Reno, 1995.)
- Hard Red Wheat (Two Magpie Press, 1985)
