= Vess (name) =

Vess is both a surname and a given name. Notable people and fictional characters with the name include:

== People ==
- Charles Vess (born 1951), American illustrator and comics artist
- Vess Ossman (1868–1923), American banjoist and recording artist
- Vess Quinlan (born 1940), American poet

== Fictional characters ==
- Liliana Vess, necromancer in the trading card game Magic: The Gathering
