= Oscar Loew =

German agricultural chemist (1844–1941)

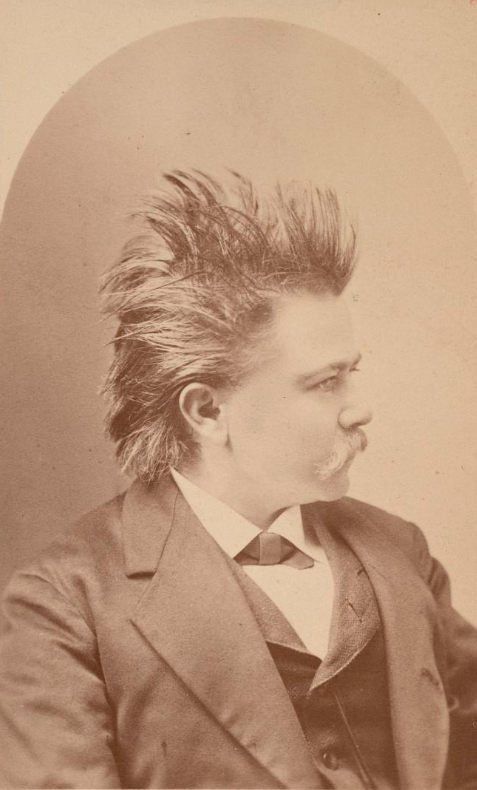
- Born: 2 April 1844; Marktredwitz, Bavaria
- Died: 26 January 1941 (aged 96); Berlin, Germany
- Occupation: agronomist

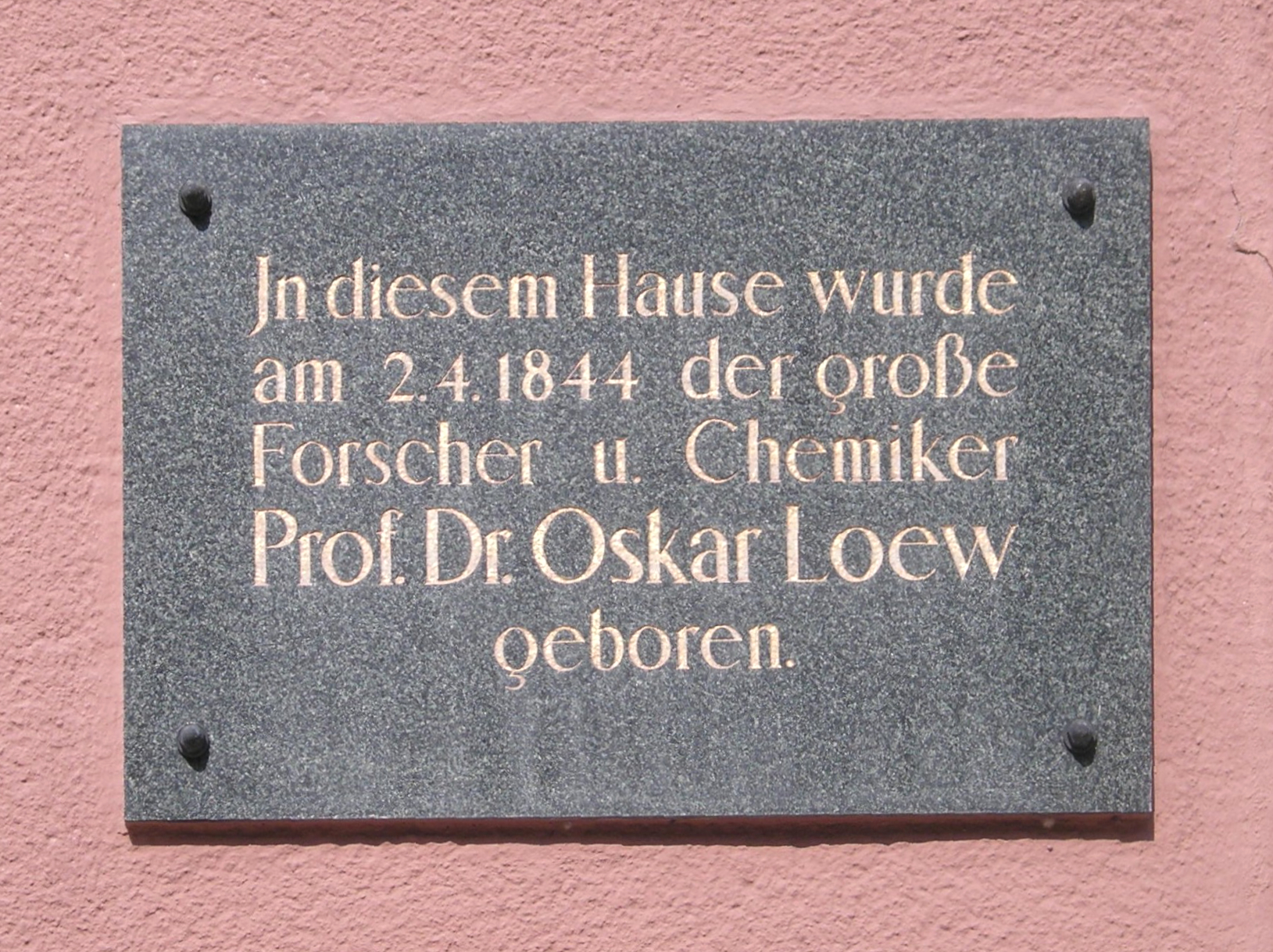
Oskar Loew Memorial Tablet in Marktredwitz

Oscar Loew (2 April 1844 – 26 January 1941) was a German agricultural chemist, active in Germany, the United States, and Japan in the late 19th and early 20th centuries.

== Biography ==
Loew was born in Marktredwitz, Bavaria, where his father was a pharmacist. He studied at the Ludwig-Maximilians-Universität München under the noted chemist Justus von Liebig; he was Liebig's last student. Loew was an assistant in plant physiology at the City College of New York and participated in four expeditions to the southwestern United States in 1882 before returning to Munich, Germany, where he collaborated with Carl Nägeli. Loew became associate professor at the Ludwig-Maximilians-Universität München in 1886. In 1893, he was recruited by the Meiji government of Japan as a foreign advisor, and travelled to Tokyo, where he remained until 1898. Loew served as instructor at Tokyo Imperial University between 1893 and 1907, succeeding Oskar Kellner as professor of agricultural chemistry there. He trained many notable Japanese chemists, including Umetaro Suzuki. While in Japan, he researched the effects of lime on acidic soils.

On the expiration of his contract in 1898, Loew moved to Washington, D.C., where he worked in the United States Department of Agriculture until 1900. While in Washington, he discovered the enzyme catalase and carried out investigations on the influence of calcium and magnesium on plant development. He worked for a short time in Puerto Rico before settling back in Munich in 1910, where he was employed as private contractor working with soil bacteriological problems. In 1913, he accepted the position of professor of chemical plant physiology at the Ludwig-Maximilians-Universität München.

Loew was a versatile researcher and produced several significant technical papers on organic chemistry and enzyme theory. Decades before the work of Buchner, Loew was convinced that the activity of yeasts was not a function of the living cell, but of the enzymes produced by the yeasts. Loew invented a method to produce formaldehyde from methanol by oxidation with atmospheric oxygen and metallic copper as a catalyst. He proposed the name 'catalase' for the enzyme that decomposes hydrogen peroxide to oxygen and water. His work in this area focused on tobacco leaf extracts.

In 1892, Loew observed that both calcium and magnesium can be toxic to plants when there is an excess of one and a deficiency of the other, thus suggesting there may be an optimal Ca:Mg ratio. In 1901, with D.W. May, he did further testing and suggested an ideal Ca:Mg ratio of 5 to 4, though for several species maximum growth was obtained across a wide range of ratios. This work was key to identifying the principle of cation exchange capacity and facilitating William Albrecht's later work on the Base Cation Saturation Ratio (BCSR), which is a method of interpreting soil test results that is now widely used in sustainable agriculture.

Loew died in Berlin in 1941. His grave is at the municipal cemetery of Lichterfelde West in Berlin.

== Partial bibliography ==
- Ein natürliches System der Gift-Wirkungen . Wolff & Lüneburg, München 1893 Digital edition by the University and State Library Düsseldorf
- The Energy of Living Protoplasm (1896)
- Die Chemische Energie der Lebenden Zellen (1899; second edition 1906)
- The Physiological Role of Mineral Nutrients (1899)
- Curing and Fermentation of Cigar Leaf Tobacco (1899)
- Physiological Studies on Connecticut Leaf Tobacco (1900)
- The Relation of Lime and Magnesia to Plant Growth (1901)
- Catalase: A New Enzym of General Occurrence, with special reference to the tobacco plant (1901)
- L'Énergie Chimique Primaire de la Matière Vivante (1904, par Oscar Loew avec la collaboration de M.-Emm. Pozzi-Escot)
- Studies on Acid Soils of Porto Rico (1913)
- Der Kalkbedarf von Mensch und Tier. Zur chemischen Physiologie des Kalks (1924)
- Das Calcium im Leben der Haustiere, 1939
