= Extinct species in art =

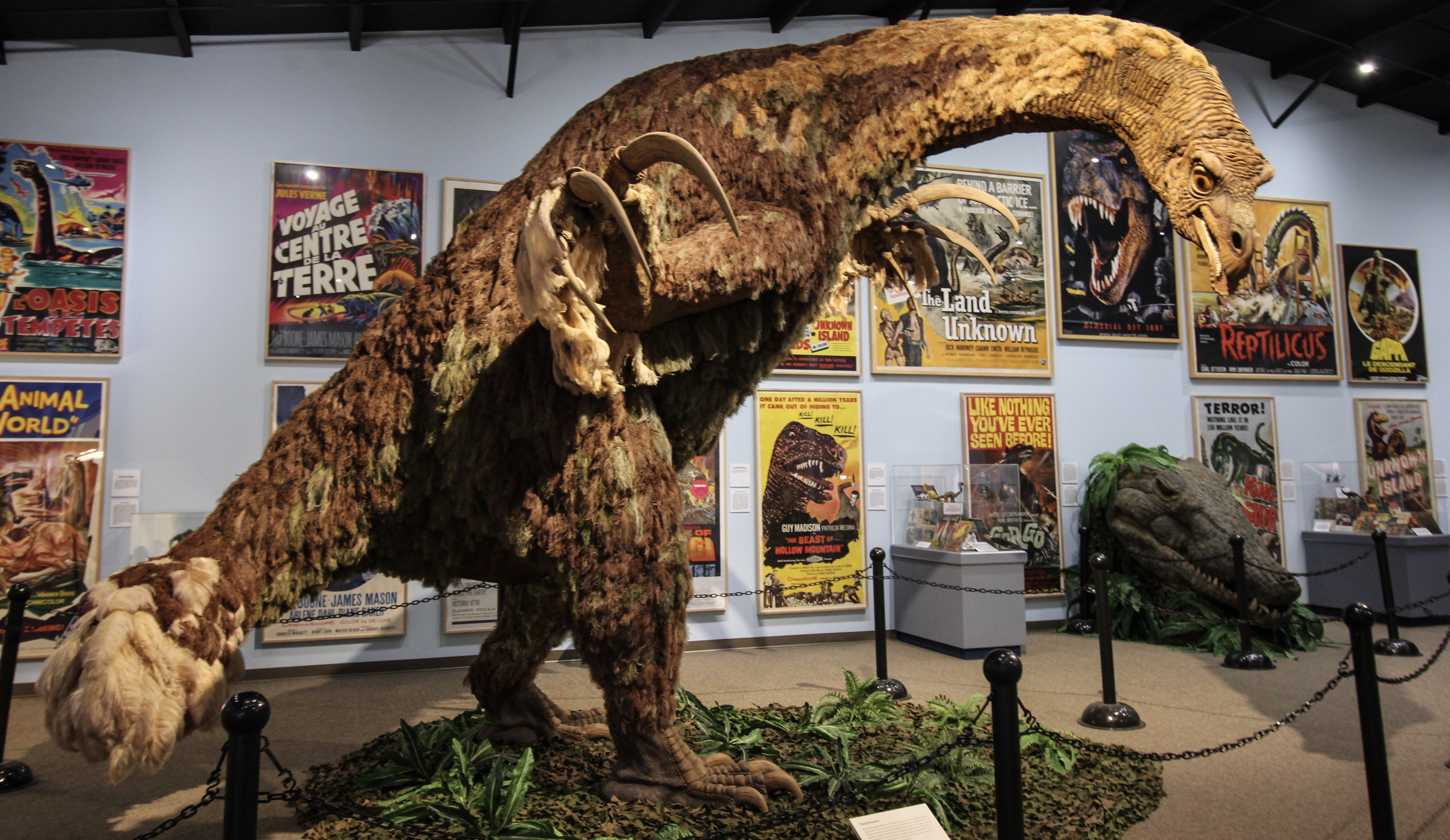
An installation from the Dinosaur Museum, Blanding, Utah

The artistic practice of depicting and representing extinct species can be in the form of painting, sculpture, photography, digital art, installation art, and various other artistic media. The practice dates back to prehistoric times and continues into the present day, with extinct species being depicted in both traditional and contemporary art. The significance of this practice lies in the exploration of themes like biodiversity loss, historical documentation, memory, and the ethics of extinction.

== History ==
Art featuring extinct species can be traced back to cave paintings, such as the depiction of the woolly mammoth in the Lascaux cave in France. In the Middle Ages, mythical and real creatures that were possibly based on fossil remains, such as dragons and unicorns, became common in artwork and literature.

With the emergence of the concept of extinction in the 18th and 19th centuries, the art world began to take a different perspective on these extinct creatures. Natural history illustrations, such as those created by Charles R. Knight, started to incorporate extinct species based on scientific research, providing a glimpse into a world that no longer exists.

In the 20th and 21st centuries, with growing environmental awareness, artists have used extinct species to highlight issues of biodiversity loss and human impact on the environment.

== Styles and themes ==
Artists often use extinct species in their work to communicate different themes and messages. This can range from a scientific or historical documentation of extinct creatures to an exploration of themes such as mortality, memory, and loss.

A common style is 'paleoart,' where artists strive to recreate extinct species and their environments as accurately as possible based on scientific evidence. This form of art is often used in museum displays, books, and educational materials.

Another style is more conceptual, using extinct species as symbols or metaphors. This is often seen in contemporary art, where the extinct species might be used to critique human actions and their impact on the environment, or to explore themes of loss and extinction.

== Notable artists and works ==
Numerous artists have used extinct species in their work, with different aims and styles:

- Charles R. Knight - an early 20th-century artist known for his life-like illustrations of dinosaurs and other prehistoric animals, many of which have been displayed in museums around the world.
- Ray Troll - known for his whimsical and scientifically accurate depictions of prehistoric life, often incorporating humor and pop culture references.
- Agnes Denes - her work "Tree Mountain - A Living Time Capsule," although not depicting extinct species directly, addresses issues of biodiversity and conservation. The project involved the planting of a forest in Finland to offset carbon dioxide and provide habitat for various species.
- Alexis Rockman - known for his detailed and vibrant paintings of natural history and ecology, Rockman often includes extinct species in his works to highlight environmental issues.

== See also ==
- Environmental art
- Paleoart
- Wildlife art
