= Bruce Kiskaddon =

- Bruce Kiskaddon
- Born: November 25, 1878; Foxburg, Pennsylvania, US
- Died: December 7,1950 (aged 72)
- Occupations: Cowboy, Bellhop, Poet
- Writing career
- Genre: Cowboy poetry

Bruce Kiskaddon (1878–1950) has been called the quintessential cowboy poet of the 20th century and is widely considered to be the cowboy poet laureate of America. His poems were widely published in calendars and books throughout his lifetime. In the mid-1980s, the birth of the cowboy poetry renaissance renewed interest in his work.

Bruce Harvey Kiskaddon was born in 1878 in Pennsylvania. He started his cowboy life in 1898 working in the Picket Wire district of Colorado. Kiskaddon worked for ten years as a cowboy. He frequently amused his fellow cowboys by writing parodies of songs and putting into rhyme the happenings around the ranch and on the trail.

At the outbreak of World War I, Kiskaddon joined the Army and served honorably in France with the cavalry. He remained overseas, spending time in the ranches of Australia as a jackaroo. When he returned to the United States, he found employment with Tap Duncan, a well-known and successful cattle rancher.

Kiskaddon entertained his fellow cowboys with his creative rewriting of popular songs. In 1922, with the encouragement of his employer, he wrote western poems about what life was really like in the west. With Duncan's encouragement, Kiskaddon began writing poetry that was both popular with cowboys and the general reading public. In 1924, he published his first book of poetry.

In 1926, Kiskaddon left the cowboy life behind for a career in films. He traveled to Hollywood to audition for a job as an extra in the movie Ben-Hur. He stayed in Hollywood the rest of his life, working as an extra and taking bit parts in Westerns. He supported himself mainly working as a bellhop in Hollywood hotels. He included several of his poems relating to hotel life in his book Just As Is published in 1928.

For years, Kiskaddon's poetry appeared in calendars from the Los Angeles Union Stock Yards. He continued to write and consolidate his poetry and reminisces of life on the range in the Western Livestock Journal. He published collections of his poetry in 1928, 1935, and 1947. The Los Angeles Union Stockyards continued to publish his poems and illustrations in calendars through 1959.

Bruce Kiskaddon died in 1950. Today, he is remembered by Cowboy Poetry enthusiasts for his authenticity and skill at invoking life in the west as it once was.

There is one cowboy poet whose work has the absolute, real, bona fide, gritty ring of experience and truth. Bruce Kiskaddon lived the life. He wrangled, he roped, he rode, he wrecked, he suffered all kinds of weather. He did not embellish the life. The meter was less than technically perfect. But he remembers and re-creates the historic world of the ranch and range of the late 19th and early 20th century. His words echo the ones heard on the frontier.
