= S. Omar Barker =

American poet

Member of the New Mexico House of Representatives
- In office 1924–1926

Personal details
- Born: Squire Omar Barker; June 16, 1894 Beulah, New Mexico, U.S.
- Died: April 2, 1985 (aged 91) Las Vegas, New Mexico, U.S.
- Spouse: Elsa McCormick (m. 1927)
- Education: New Mexico Highlands University

Military service
- Branch/service: United States Army
- Battles/wars: World War I

S. Omar Barker (June 16, 1894 – April 2, 1985), was an American cowboy poet, politician rancher, and teacher in New Mexico. He published many books, including Vientos de las Sierras (1924), Buckaroo Ballads (1928) and Rawhide Rhymes: Singing Poems of the Old West (Doubleday, 1968).

== Early life and education ==
Squire Omar Barker, named after his father, was born on a small mountain ranch in Beulah, New Mexico. He was the youngest in a family of eleven children. He grew up on the family homestead and attended high school in Las Vegas, New Mexico. Barker graduated from New Mexico Highlands University.

== Career ==
Barker worked as a Spanish teacher, high school principal, forest ranger, sergeant of the 502nd Engineers in France in World War I, trombone player in Doc Patterson's Cowboy Band, and newspaper correspondent. From 1924 to 1926, Barker was a member of the New Mexico House of Representatives. He began writing and selling stories, articles, and poems as early as 1914 and became a full-time writer at the end of his legislative term.

He once estimated his career output at about 1,500 short stories and novelettes, about 1,200 factual articles, about 2,000 poems. They appeared in a broad range of publications from pulp magazines to such prestigious slicks as Saturday Evening Post and a varied array of general newspapers and magazines. He produced five volumes of poetry, one book of short stories and one novel, Little World Apart, as well as one western cookbook with Carol Truax. He was a co-writer for one episode of Sugarfoot in 1957.

The work probably best known to the general public was his poem, "A Cowboy's Christmas Prayer," which has been printed more than one hundred times, recorded by Tennessee Ernie Ford and Jimmy Dean, and plagiarized more than once. He won the Western Writers of America Spur Award twice and was the 1967 recipient of the Levi Strauss Saddleman Award for bringing honor and dignity to the Western legend. In 1975 he was named an honorary president of WWA, of which he was one of the founding fathers and an early president. Elsa also served a term as president. In 1978 he was the first living author to be inducted into the Hall of Fame of Great Westerners in the National Cowboy & Western Heritage Museum in Oklahoma City.

He was well known as the "Sage of Sapello" and the "Poet Lariat of New Mexico".

Barker used to submit stories and poems to a bi-weekly Western pulp magazine called Ranch Romances. Sometime in the 1930s, he was asked by the editor to rewrite a story submitted by an old Texas cowhand named Jack Potter about his life of driving cattle. This started a collaboration between the two that lasted for years. Potter had two books of his published, including "Lead Steer and Other Tales" (1939). It that book he wrote how he met and courted his wife, Cordie, and how he proposed. With Jack's permission, Barker turned that narrative into a poem entitled "Jack Potter's Courtin'" That poem was published in Ranch Romances in September 1941. It has become one of S. Omar Barker's most recited poems.

Prior to publication, however, Potter sent out a copy of "Jack Potter's Courtin'" as a Christmas greeting in 1940. It was professionally printed on the letterhead of the Trail Drivers and Pioneers Association of New Mexico. The stationery also lists officers of the organization, including Jack M. Potter, President, and S. Omar Barker, Historian and Poet.

== Personal life ==
He married Elsa McCormick of Hagerman, New Mexico, in 1927, and she also became a noted writer of Western stories. He often signed his books with his initials and trademark brand, "Lazy SOB." Barker died in 1985 and was buried at the Santa Fe National Cemetery.

== See also ==
- Cowboy poetry
- Waddie Mitchell
