= Wally McRae =

American cowboy poet (1936–2025)

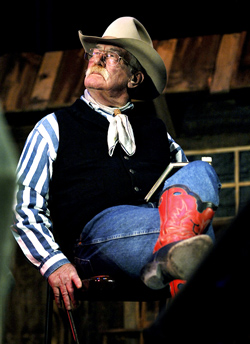
- McRae in 1990
- Born: Wallace Donald McRae; February 26, 1936; Rosebud, Montana, U.S.
- Died: June 22, 2025 (aged 89)
- Education: Montana State University (BS)
- Occupations: Cowboy, cowboy poet
- Spouse: Ruth Hayes
- Writing career
- Years active: 1985–2025
- Genres: Poetry, stories
- Notable works: "Reincarnation" "Things of Intrinsic Worth"
- Notable awards: National Heritage Fellowship

Wallace Donald McRae (February 26, 1936 – June 22, 2025) was an American rancher, cowboy, cowboy poet and philosopher. He ran the 30,000-acre (120 km^{2}) Rocker Six Cattle Co. ranch on Rosebud Creek, south of Rosebud, Montana.

== Background ==
McRae was born on February 26, 1936. A third-generation rancher, his family members raised cattle and sheep in southeastern Montana from 1885.

He attended grade school and high school in nearby Colstrip, Montana. He graduated from Montana State University in 1958 with a degree in zoology and chemistry. After college, he was commissioned by the United States Navy and served in both the Atlantic and Mediterranean fleets. Following the death of his father in 1960, McRae returned to Montana with his wife Ruth Hayes to take over the family ranching operations.

McRae died on June 22, 2025, at the age of 89.

== Career ==
McRae recalled having recited his first poem at age 4, at the one-room schoolhouse attended by his sisters. Thereafter, he published more than 100 poems on topics both humorous and romantic, as well as matters of social concern such as environmental protection.

As a poet, McRae was considered a "fixture at national cowboy poet gatherings" and was "internationally known for his poem 'Reincarnation' ". Since 2015, McRae was an invited performer at every Elko Cowboy Poetry Gathering.

Journalist Charles Kuralt discussed McRae's efforts to preserve the land and the cowboy way of life in a small community in his book, Charles Kuralt's America. McRae was the subject of a segment on the American TV newsmagazine series 60 Minutes and he read his poetry in a 1999 episode of the PBS series P.O.V. His poems have been included in many anthologies of cowboy poetry. In addition, McRae wrote the foreword to a collection of cowboy poetry published in 2000.

== Awards and honors ==
- 1989: Governor's Award for the Arts in Montana
- 1990: National Heritage Fellowship from the National Endowment for the Arts
- Nominated by President Bill Clinton to serve on the National Council of the Arts
- 1999: The Missoulian listed McRae as number 42 in the Most Influential Montanans of the Century
- 2009: Montana Book of the Year award for Stick Horses
- 2020: Inducted into the Montana Cowboy Hall of Fame, with the Living Award
- H.G. Merriam Award, University of Montana Mansfield Library

== Published works ==
- Stick Horses and Other Stories of Ranch Life (2009)
- Cowboy Curmudgeon and Other Poems (1992)
- Things of Intrinsic Worth: Poems (1989)
- It's Just Grass & Water: Poems (1986)
- Up North is Down the Crick: Poems (1985)
