= William Albrecht =

American agronomist (1888–1974)

William A. Albrecht
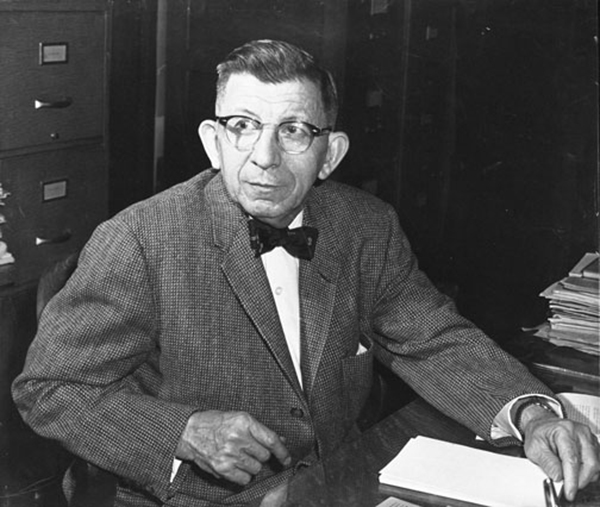
- Born: September 12, 1888; Illinois, U.S.
- Died: May 19, 1974 (aged 85); Columbia, Missouri, U.S.
- Occupation: Agronomist

William Albert Albrecht (September 12, 1888 – May 19, 1974) chairman of the Department of Soils at the University of Missouri, was the foremost authority on the relation of soil fertility to human health and earned four degrees from the University of Illinois at Urbana–Champaign. As emeritus professor of soils at the University of Missouri, he saw a direct link between soil quality, food quality and human health. He drew direct connections between poor quality forage crops, and ill health in livestock and from this developed a formula for ideal ratios of cations in the soil, the Base Cation Saturation Ratio. While he did not discover cation exchange in the soil as is sometimes supposed, he may have been the first to associate it with colloidal clay particles. He served as 1939 President of the Soil Science Society of America.

Twenty years before the phrase 'environmental concern' crept into the national consciousness, he was lecturing from coast to coast on the broad topic of agricultural ecology. (C. Edmund Marshall, In Memoriam, 'Plant and Soil' vol 48.)

" The soil is the ‘creative material’ of most of the basic needs of life. Creation starts with a handful of dust.” Dr. William A. Abrecht.

== Early life ==
William Albrecht was born of German ancestry on a farm on the prairie of north central Illinois in the Midwest United States. After attending the local school, he progressed via preparatory school to the University of Illinois, where he obtained a B.A. degree in liberal arts. This led to a position teaching Latin and other subjects at Bluffton University, Ohio.

Albrecht later returned to Illinois to gain a B.S. degree in biology and agricultural science. He then started graduate research in Botany whilst also teaching in the department of botany. This period was key to his lifelong devotion to the scientific study of plant physiology and agriculture. It enabled him to take a microbiological view of plant structure whilst addressing the soil as a variable environment (either favourable or unsuitable). He presented his doctoral research in 1919, and it was published in the journal Soil Science in 1920 titled 'Symbiotic nitrogen fixation as influenced by nitrogen in the soil' His paper concluded that the nitrogen level in soil had no significant effect on fixation by legumes.

== Career ==
Albrecht was a devout agronomist, the foremost authority on the relation of soil fertility to human health and earned four degrees from the University of Illinois. He became emeritus professor of soils at the University of Missouri. Dr. Albrecht saw a direct link between soil quality and food quality, drawing direct connection between poor quality forage crops, and ill health in livestock.

From the late 1930s, as chairman of the Department of Soils at the University of Missouri, he began work at the Missouri Agricultural Experiment Station investigating cation ratios and the growth of legumes. He had been investigating cattle nutrition, having observed that certain pastures seemed conducive to good health, and at some point he came to the conclusion that the ideal balance of cations in the soil was "H, 10%; Ca, 60 to 75% optimal 69%; Mg, 10 to 20% optimal 12%; K, 2 to 5%; Na, 0.5 to 5.0%; and other cations, 5%".

While Albrecht was a highly respected soil scientist, he discounted soil pH, stating that "plants are not sensitive to, or limited by, a particular pH value of the soil." Instead, he believed that the benefit of liming soil stems from the additional calcium available to the plant, not the increase in pH. This belief has continued to be held by followers to this day, despite opinions to the contrary. Like much of the early research into BCSR where soil pH was not controlled, it is difficult to draw solid conclusions from Albrecht's research in support of BCSR.

"..."You have to have a vision. Unless you do, nature will never reveal herself." Dr William A Albrecht.

Throughout his life, Albrecht looked to nature to learn what optimizes soil, and attributing many common livestock diseases directly to those animals being fed poor quality feeds. He observed that :

"...“Food is fabricated soil fertility.”

Albrecht was a prolific author of reports, books and articles that span several decades, starting with his reports on nitrogen fixation and soil inoculation in 1919. MVG

== Soil depletion ==
Albrecht was outspoken on matters of declining soil fertility, having identified that it was due to a lack of organic material, major elements, and trace minerals, and was thus responsible for poor crops and in turn for pathological conditions in animals fed deficient foods from such soils.

He laid the blame as:

"NPK formulas, (nitrogen, phosphorus, potassium) as legislated and enforced by State Departments of Agriculture, mean malnutrition, attack by insects, bacteria and fungi, weed takeover, crop loss in dry weather, and general loss of mental acuity in the population, leading to degenerative metabolic disease and early death".

== Death and commemoration ==
On his death he left his research papers to his friend Charles Walters who promoted the ideas by founding the magazine Acres USA, which continues to be at the centre of the ideal soil movement, and is the current owner of the research papers.

== List of publications ==
Albrecht published widely from 1918 through 1970:

- Variable Levels of Biological Activity in Sanborn Field After Fifty Years of Treatment, Soil Science, 1938
- Animals Recognize Good Soil Treatment, Better Crops With Plant Food Magazine, 1940
- Organic Matter – The Life of the Soil, Farmer's Week, Ohio State University, 1940
- Good Horses Require Good Soils, Horse and Mule Association of America, 1940
- Calcium-Potassium-Phosphorus Relation as a Possible Factor in Ecological Array of Plants, Journal of the American Society of Agronomy, 1940
- Making Organic Matter Effective in Soil, The Ohio Vegetable and Potato Growers Association, 1940
- Calcium as a Factor in Seed Germination, Journal of the American Society of Agronomy, 1941
- The Soil as a Farm Commodity or a Factory, Journal of the American Society of Farm Managers and Rural Appraisers, 1941
- Soil Organic Matter and Ion Availability for Plants, Soil Science, 1941
- Biological Assays of Soil Fertility, Soil Science Society of America, 1941
- Potassium in the Soil Colloid Complex and Plant Nutrition, Soil Science, 1941
- Feed Efficiency in Terms of Biological Assays of Soil Treatments, Soil Science Society of America, 1942
- Health Depends on Soil, The Land, 1942
- Soil Management By Nature or By Man?, Western Soils Co., 1942
- Soil Fertility and the Human Species, American Chemical Society, Chemical and Engineering News, 1942
- We Are What We Eat - St. Louis Post-Dispatch, 1943
- Why Do Farmers Plow?, Better Crops With Plant Food Magazine, 1943
- Magnesium Depletion in Relation to Some Cropping Systems and Soil Treatments, Soil Science, 1943
- We Are What We Eat, St. Louis Post-Dispatch, 1943
- Make the Grass Greener on Your Side of the Fence, The Business of Farming, 1943
- Soil and Livestock, The Land, 1943
- Fertilize the Soil Then the Crop, University of Missouri, 1943
- Soil Fertility and National Nutrition, Journal of the American Society of Farm Managers and Rural Appraisers, 1944
- Better Pastures Depend on Soil Fertility, The Fertilizer Review, 1944
- Taking Our Soil for Granted, The Ranchman, 1944
- Soil Fertility, Food Source, The Technology Review, 1944
- Mobilizing the Fertilizer Resources of Our Nation's Soil, 28th Annual Convention of the National Crushed Stone Association, 1945
- How Long Do the Effects from Fertilizer Last?, Better Crops With Plant Food Magazine, 1945
- Food Quality from the Soil, Consumer's Research, Inc., 1945
- Vegetable Crops in Relation to Soil Fertility, Food Research, 1945
- Discrimination in Food Selection by Animals, The Scientific Monthly, 1945
- Vegetable Crops in Relation to Soil Fertility-V. Calcium contents of Green Leafy Vegetable, Food Research, 1945
- By Soil Treatments on Pastures, Guernsey Breeders' Journal, 1946
- Extra Soil Fertility Lengthens Grazing Season!, Guernsey Breeders' Journal, 1946
- Why Be a Friend of the Land?, Land Letter, 1946
- The Soil as the Basis of Wildlife, Management University of Missouri, 1946
- Soil and Livestock Work Together, 42nd Annual Meeting-American Meat Institute, 1947
- Soil Fertility - The Basis of Agricultural Production, 4th Annual Meeting of the Western Colorado Horticultural Society, 1947
- Soil Fertility and Animal Production, 58th Annual Meeting of the Indiana State Dairy Association, 1947
- Our Teeth and our Soils, Annals of Dentistry, 1947
- Hidden Hungers Point to Soil Fertility, Chilean Nitrate Educational Bureau, Inc., 1947
- Use Extra Soil Fertility to Provide Protein, Guernsey Breeders' Journal, 1947
- Better Soils Make Better Hogs, Hampshire Herdsman, 1947
- Limestone—The Foremost of Natural Fertilizer, Pit and Quarry, 1947
- Soil Fertility and Nutritive Value of Foods, Agricultural Leaders' Digest, 1948
- Some Rates of Fertility Decline, Better Crops With Plant Food Magazine, 1948
- There is No Substitute for Soil Fertility, Better Crops With Plant Food Magazine, 1948
- Quality of Crops also Depends on Soil Fertility, Chilean Nitrate Educational Bureau, Inc., 1948
- Potassium Helps Put More Nitrogen into Sweetclover, Journal of the American Society of Agronomy, 1948
- National Pattern of Tooth Troubles Points to Pattern of Soil Fertility, Journal of the Missouri State Dental Association, 1948
- Climate, Soil, and Health. I. Climatic Soil Pattern and Food Composition, Oral Surgery, Oral Medicine, and Oral Pathology, 1948
- Building Soils for Better Herds, Polled Hereford World, 1948
- Diversity of Amino Acids in Legumes According to the Soil Fertility, Science, 1948
- Carbohydrate-Protein Ratio of Peas in Relation to Fertilization with Potassium, Calcium, and Nitrogen, Soil Science of America Proceedings, 1948
- Is the Cure in the Soil?, The Furrow, 1948
- Soil and Protein, The Land, 1948
- Our Soils Our Food and Ourselves, The Mennonite Community, 1948
- Declining Soil Fertility - Its National and International Implications, 4th Annual Convention of National Agricultural Limestone Association, 1949
- Nutrition Via Soil Fertility According to the Climatic Pattern, British Commonwealth Scientific Official Conference, 1949
- Plant and Animal Nutrition in Relation to Soil and Climatic Factors, British Commonwealth Scientific Official Conference, 1949
- Nitrogen for Proteins and Protection Against Disease, Chilean Nitrate Educational Bureau, Inc., 1949
- Cows are Capable Soil Chemists, Guernsey Breeders' Journal, 1949
- Diseases as Deficiencies Via the Soil, Iowa State College Veterinarian, 1950
- Too Much Nitrogen or Not Enough Else?, National Live Stock Producer, 1950
- Soil Fertility: Its Climatic Pattern, The Journal of Osteopathy, 1950
- Weed Killers and Soil Fertility, The Rural New Yorker, 1950
- Quality of Food Crops According to Soil Fertility, The Technology Review, 1945
- Soil Fertility and Alfalfa Production, University of Missouri, 1950
- Animals Recognize Good Soil Treatment, Better Crops with Plant Food Magazine, 1951
- Reconstructing the Soils of the World to Meet Human Needs, Chemurgic Papers, 1951
- Soil Fertility in Relation to Animal and Human Health, Milk Industry Foundation Convention Proceedings, 1951
- War: Some Agricultural Implications, Organic Gardening, 1951
- Soil Fertility and our National Future, Texas Research Foundation, 1951
- Pattern of Caries in Relation to the Pattern of Soil Fertility in the United States, The Dental Journal of Australia, 1951
- Soil Fertility Pattern: Its Suggestion about Deficiencies and Disease, The Journal of Osteopathy, 1951
- Biosynthesis of Amino Acids According to Soil Fertility, University of Missouri, 1951
- Protein Deficiencies Via Soil Deficiencies, University of Missouri, 1951
- Managing Nitrogen to Increase Protein in Grains, Victory Farm Forum, 1951
- Soil Organic Matter Emphasizes Itself, 1952
- The Load on the Land, A Symposium, 1952
- More and Better Proteins Make Better Food and Feed, Better Crops with Plant Food Magazine, 1952
- Better Proteins Grow on Better Soils, Commercial Fertilizer, 1952
- Pastures and Soils, Corn Belt Livestock Feeder, Inc., 1952
- How Smart is a Cow?, Missouri Ruralist, 1952
- Soil Fertility and Amino Acid Synthesis by Plants, National Institute of Sciences of India, 1952
- The Value of Organic Matter, Rural New Yorker, 1952
- Proteins and Reproduction, The Land, 1952
- Soil Science Looks to the Cow, The Polled Hereford World Magazine, 1952
- Soil Fertility - A Weapon Against Weeds, University of Missouri, 1952
- Potassium Bearing Minerals as Soil Treatments, University of Missouri Bulletin, 1952
- Soil Acidity as Calcium (Fertility) Deficiency, University of Missouri Bulletin, 1952
- Our Soils and Our Health, Agricultural Leaders' Digest, 1953
- Red Clover Suggests Shortage of Potash, Better Crops with Plant Food Magazine, 1953
- Soil and Nutrition, California Fertilizer Association, 1953
- Soil Fertility, The Power Control of Agricultural Creation, Missouri Farmers Association, 1953
- Biosynthesis of Amino Acids According to Soil Fertility, Plant and Soil, 1953
- Proteins are Becoming Scarcer, The Polled Hereford World Magazine, 1953
- Human Ecology - The Soil Fertility Pattern Under it, University of Missouri, 1953
- WGN Farm Hour Interview, WGN Radio, 1953
- Nutrition and the Climatic Pattern of Soil Development, American Association for the Advancement of Science, 1954
- Let Rocks Their Silence Break, American Institute of Dental Medicine, 1954
- Droughts - The Soil has Reasons for Them, Journal of Applied Nutrition, 1954
- The Influence of Soil Mineral Elements on Animal Nutrition, Michigan State University, 1954
- Lime the Soil to Feed Crops, Missouri Farm News Service, 1954
- Soil Acidity (Low pH) spells Fertility Deficiencies, Pit and Quarry, 1954
- Lime the Soil to Correct Its Major Fertility Deficiencies, Rock Products, 1954
- Reconstructing Soils, The Challenger, 1954
- Fertilizer's Services in Plant Nutrition, University of Missouri, 1954
- Do We Overlook Protein Quality?, What's New in Crops & Soils, 1954
- Thin Roots are Searching for, Thick Roots are Finding, Soil Fertility, 1955
- Make Tax Allowance for Fertility Depletion, Agricultural Leaders' Digest, 1955
- Trace Elements and Agricultural Production, American Academy of Nutrition, 1955
- Should Farmers Receive Tax Allowance for Soil-Building?, Missouri Farm News Service, 1955
- It's the Soil That Feeds Us, Natural Food Associates, 1955
- Agricultural Limestone - For the Sake of More than Its Calcium, Pit and Quarry, 1955
- Capital No Substitute for Soil Fertility, Rock Products, 1955
- The Living Soil, The Golf Course Reporter, 1955
- Chemicals for the Improvement of Soils, University of Missouri, 1955
- Fertilizer for Higher Feed Value, University of Missouri, 1955
- Proteins, The Struggle for Them by all Forms of Life, Premised on the Fertility of the Soil, University of Missouri, 1955
- Physical, Chemical, and Biochemical Changes in the Soil Community, Wenner-Gren Foundation International Symposium, 1955
- Why Your Cattle Break Through the Fence, Western Livestock Journal, 1955
- Soils, Nutrition and Animal Health, Journal of the American Society of Farm Managers and Rural Appraisers, 1956
- Man's Role in Changing the Face of the Earth, University of Chicago Press, 1956
- Trace Elements and the Production of Proteins, Original Manuscript, 1957
- Soil Fertility and Biotic Geography, The Geographical Review, 1957
- Soil Fertility and the Quality of Seeds, University of Missouri Bulletin, 1957
- Balanced Soil Fertility, , American Agricultural Reports, 1958
- Balanced Soil Fertility, Better Crops with Plant Food Magazine, 1958
- Balanced Soil Fertility - Less Plant Pests and Disease, Better Crops with Plant Food Magazine, 1958
- Balanced Soil Fertility - Less Plant Pests and Disease, Manuscript, 1958
- Soil Fertility and Plant Nutrition, Natural Food and Farming Digest, 1958
- Some Significant Truths About the Good Earth, Natural Food Associates, 1958
- Calcium - Boron Interaction, University of Missouri Bulletin, 1958
- Nitrogen, Proteins and People, Agricultural Ammonia News, 1959
- Nature Teaches Health via Nutrition, Guest Editorial, 1959
- Water: An American Problem, National Council for Social Studies, 1959
- Diagnoses or Post-Mortems?, Natural Food Associates, 1959
- Soil and Health, Natural Food Associates, 1959
- Human Health Closely Related to Soil Fertility, School and Community, 1959
- Growing Our Protein Supplements, University of Missouri, 1959
- The Biotic Pyramid, 1960
- Soil Fertility in Relation to Animal Nutrition, Manuscript, 1960
- Trace Elements, Allergies, and Soil Deficiencies, The Journal of Applied Nutrition, 1960
- Man and His Habitat - Wastebasket of the Earth, Bulletin of the Atomic Scientists, 1961
- Soils - Their Effects on the Nutritional Values of Foods, Consumer Bulletin, 1961
- Fluoridation of Public Drinking Water, Manuscript, 1961
- Introduction of "Soil, Food and Health", Manuscript, 1961
- Fertile Soils Lessen Insect Injury, 1962
- Organic Matter for Plant Nutrition, Clinical Psychology, 1962
- Rocks, Dust and Life, Manuscript, 1962
- Organic Matter Balances the Soil Fertility, Natural Food and Farming, 1962
- The Healthy Hunzas, The Journal of Applied Nutrition, 1962
- Soils Need "Living" Fertility!, Western Livestock Journal, 1962
- Soil and Survival of the Fit, Manuscript, 1963
- Only Balanced Diets for Plants, Via Soil, Can Grow Balanced Proteins, Mineralas, 1963
- A Policy for Preventing Agricultural Suicide, Natural Food and Farming, 1963
- Biosynthesis of Amino Acids According to Soil Fertility, Plant and Soil, 1963
- Lime the Soil to Correct Its Major Fertility Deficiencies, Rock Products, 1963
- Grow Self-Protection Via Soil as Nutrition, Clinical Psychology, 1964
- Magnesium - Its Relation to Calcium in Body Tissues, Let's Live, 1965
- Plant, Animal and Human Health Vary With Soil Fertility - Modern Nutrition, 1966
- Magnesium in the Soils of the United States, Let's Live, 1966
- The "Half-Lives" of Our Soils, Manuscript, 1966
- Plant, Animal and Human Health Vary With Soil Fertility, Modern Nutrition, 1966
- Magnesium Integrates With Calcium, Natural Food and Farming, 1967
- Problems of Quality in the Productivity of Agricultural Land, Journal of Applied Nutrition, 1968
- Soils and Chemistry, Manuscript, 1968
- Trace Elements and Soil Organic Matter, Manuscript, 1968
- Calcium Membranes in Plants, Animals and Man, The Journal of Applied Nutrition, 1968
- Concerning the Influence of Calcium on the Physiological Function of Magnesium, Manuscript, 1970

=== Posthumous publications ===
- Albrecht's Foundation Concepts (The Albrecht Papers, Vol I), [Paperback], William A. Albrecht (Author), Charles Walters (Editor)
- Soil Fertility & Animal Health (The Albrecht Papers, Vol II), [Paperback], William A. Albrecht (Author), Charles Walters (Editor)
- Albrecht on Calcium (The Albrecht Papers, Vol V), [Paperback], William A. Albrecht (Author), Charles Walters (Editor)
- Albrecht on Pastures (The Albrecht Papers, Vol VI), [Paperback], William A. Albrecht (Author), Charles Walters (Editor)
- Albrecht on Soil Balancing (The Albrecht Papers, Vol VII), [Paperback], William A. Albrecht (Author), Charles Walters (Editor)

== See also ==
- Ion exchange
