= Base-cation saturation ratio =

Base-cation saturation ratio (BCSR) is a method of interpreting soil test results that is widely used in sustainable agriculture, supported by the National Sustainable Agriculture Information Service (ATTRA) and claimed to be successfully in use on over a million acres (4,000 km^{2}) of farmland worldwide. The traditional method, as used by most university laboratories, is known variously as the 'sufficiency level', sufficiency level of available nutrients (SLAN), or Index(UK) system. The sufficiency level system is concerned only with keeping plant-available nutrient levels within a well studied range, making sure there is neither a deficiency nor an excess. In the BCSR system, soil cations are balanced according to varying ratios often stated as giving 'ideal' or 'balanced' soil. These ratios can be between individual cations, such as the calcium to magnesium ratio, or they may be expressed as a percentage saturation of the cation exchange capacity (CEC) of the soil. Most 'ideal soil' theories stress both approaches. (See also – Cation exchange capacity)

Strictly speaking, the 'base' cations are limited to calcium, magnesium, potassium, and sodium, and these are the primary nutrients that BCSR methods are most concerned with balancing. However, many proponents of 'ideal soil' theories also stress the importance of balancing the anions phosphorus, sulphur and chlorine as well as numerous minor and trace elements. The conventional SLAN system does not generally test for minor and trace elements unless there is sufficient cause to suspect a deficiency or toxicity.

BCSR supporters argue that though their method does not produce greater bulk yield than SLAN, soil balanced using their methods leads to greater plant, animal and human health, as well as increasing the soil biological activity and the physical properties of tilth, aeration, and moisture retention. There is currently no publicly available research or trial data to support these claims, but BCSR systems are fairly widely used in organic farms and many positive testimonials from farmers and gardeners can be found on the internet and in alternative agriculture literature. Under most circumstances following BCSR systems will not lead to negative effects. The main concern for farmers is simply the unnecessary expense of applying soil amendments beyond what the crop can actually utilise.

== History of BCSR methods ==
The cation exchange principle was discovered by Thomas Way and John Bennet Lawes at Rothamsted Experimental Station in the 19th century. In 1892 Oscar Loew observed that both calcium and magnesium can be toxic to plants when there is an excess of one and a deficiency of the other, thus suggesting there may be an optimal Ca:Mg ratio. In 1901 Oscar Loew and D.W. May did further testing and suggested an ideal Ca:Mg ratio of 5 to 4, though for several species maximum growth was obtained across a wide range of ratios. In 1916 Lipman reviewed the literature up to that point and concluded that while some researchers seemed to have identified 'optimal' Ca:Mg ratios for certain species, there was no evidence that the Ca:Mg ratio influenced growth.

Later, in 1933, Moser also reviewed the literature and performed his own experiments, coming to the same conclusion as Lipman that there was no evidence for the Ca:Mg ratio influencing yield. He found that in high magnesium soils, low yields were due to a calcium deficiency, rather than an imbalance. This meant that liming would increase yield, but only up to the point where the deficiency was corrected.

From the late 1930s, William Albrecht, the Chairman of the Department of Soils at the University of Missouri, began work at the Missouri Agricultural Experiment Station investigating cation ratios and the growth of legumes. Albrecht had been investigating cattle nutrition, having observed that certain pastures seemed conducive to good health, and at some point he came to the conclusion that the ideal balance of cations in the soil was "H, 10%; Ca, 60 to 75%; Mg, 10 to 20%; K, 2 to 5%; Na, 0.5 to 5.0%; and other cations, 5%". At his death he left his papers to his friend Charles Walters who promoted the ideas by founding the magazine AcresUSA, which continues to be at the centre of the ideal soil movement.

While Albrecht was a highly respected soil scientist, he discounted soil pH, stating that "plants are not sensitive to, or limited by, a particular pH value of the soil." Instead, he believed that the benefits of liming soil stem from the additional calcium available to the plant, not the increase in pH. This belief has continued to be held by followers to this day, despite much evidence to the contrary. Like much of the early research into BCSR where soil pH was not controlled, it is difficult to draw solid conclusions from Albrecht's research in support of BCSR.

At around the same time as Albrecht was working in Missouri, F.E. Bear in New Jersey was investigating whether calcium amendments could be used to limit the excess uptake of potassium in alfalfa plants in order to reduce fertiliser costs. From these studies he issued a bulletin with Prince and Malcolm in 1945 that tentatively proposed an 'ideal soil' ratio where the proportions of exchangeable cations were 65% Ca, 10% Mg, 5% K and 20% H. They confirmed their hypothesis with further experiments in 1948 (published with Toth).

In 1959 E.R. Graham suggested a modification to Bear's ratios where calcium could range between 65% and 85% of the CEC. Both Bear and Graham came to these conclusions after analysing various soils and noting a correlation between the ratios of cations and the productivity of the soils. Though deduction of this sort is generally eschewed by modern sciences in favour of testing in a more controlled environment, it is considered a valid method in agronomy and ecology where the complexity of the natural environment makes reductive techniques less useful. However, neither Bear nor Graham appear to have tested their theories by varying the ratios and studying the effects.

In 1981, Baker and Amacher redefined the ideal ratio as 60–80% Ca, 10–20% Mg, 2–5% K. A decade later Neal Kinsey co-wrote a book with Charles Walters called "Hands on Agronomy" in which he defined the ideal ratios as 60–70% Ca, 10–20% Mg, 3–5% K, 1% Na, 10–15 H, 2–4% other cations. Kinsey's book has gone on to become the most widely known and influential work on the BCSR system.

Certain studies conducted in 2008-2011 raise doubts about the efficacy of BCSR.

== BCSR and plant yield ==
Toth, in a later experiment to investigate the 'ideal soil' ratios he had previously worked on with Bear, came to the conclusion that so long as calcium was the dominant cation, no specific cation ratio produced a better yield of ladino clover. Even with Mg and K as high as 40%, far higher than the 'ideal' range, no difference in yield was obtained.

Similar conclusions have since been drawn by other studies showing no relation between yield and cation ratios, providing calcium is more abundant than magnesium. Though the investigations have mostly investigated Calcium ratios, studies looking at Potassium to Magnesium ratios also showed no differences in yield, providing there was not a deficiency or excess. Indeed, it seems that the earlier positive results of Bear and co-workers trials can be directly attributable to soil pH.

== BCSR and nutritional quality ==
Perhaps the most controversial aspect of BCSR (and organic farming in general) relates to the practitioners' beliefs that a correctly balanced soil will yield more nutritious produce. Though some studies have shown a decrease in mineral content of fruit and vegetables over the last half century this is in dispute and the causes are uncertain. It has been speculated that hybrid varieties bred for yield, uniformity, pest resistance, appearance, and shelf life over taste (a good indicator of nutritional quality) may be at fault rather than the soil. Aside from soil composition, other factors such as irrigation and sunlight exposure have also been theorised, but so far no conclusions can be drawn.

William Albrecht first theorised that crops grown on 'unbalanced' soils are of lower nutritional value, based on studying the habits of grazing cattle – noting in particular their avoidance of the lush grass that grew on dung patches. A study he conducted with G.E. Smith is cited by proponents of BCSR theory, but has been criticised for a variety of reasons, chief of which being that the pH of the soil was not controlled, since Albrecht did not believe pH to be important. Thus, the increases in root nodulation of legumes (and subsequent increases in yield) that he associated with calcium levels were likely due to the increases in pH, which is known to free up Molybdenum, a micronutrient essential for root nodulation to occur. Legumes are an important source of protein in grazing animals, hence, other studies that show an increase in cattle health from calcium applications to pastures are likely due to the increase in pH and the subsequent increase in legume populations.

Another study worth mentioning for its prevalence in the alternative agriculture literature is that undertaken by Bear and Toth in 1948 investigating the mineral composition of fruit and vegetables on a range of different soils across the US. Indeed, this old study remains so prevalent because of the dearth of literature comparing soil properties and crop nutritional value. The study suggests that soil composition effects mineral content of crops, but due to the large numbers of unexplored variables it is difficult to draw firm conclusions.

More recent studies that specifically set out to test the influence of cation ratios on nutrition are less encouraging. A three-year field study performed by Mark Schonbeck which was 'initially undertaken to validate the Albrecht formula in organic production' showed no variation in Brix (a controversial index of nutritional quality used by many in the ideal soil community) of the vegetables grown on soils of different cation ratios. However, Schonbeck admitted limitations in the data and called for further study. Additionally, in 2005, Stevens et al. found no relationship between the quality of cotton and the Ca:Mg ratio, and in 1996 Kellings et al. came to the same conclusion regarding alfalfa quality and yield.

== BCSR and the physical properties of the soil ==
Liming heavy clay soils has long been used to improve their structure, but BCSR practitioners claim the reason it does so is the increase in the Ca:Mg ratio rather than an increase in pH. However, studies have shown that soil structure is maintained in a wide range of Ca:Mg ratios when pH is kept the same. Schonbeck's farm trials found that a reduction in Mg saturation had no effect on compaction, moisture content, infiltration rate, or soil strength. In fact he found the two soils most 'unbalanced' according to the Albrecht formula were the two soils with the best physical structure. A study of Midwest United States soils on the other hand concluded that high Mg "can cause increased surface sealing and erosion in Midwestern soils."

== BCSR and soil biology ==
BCSR followers have claimed that balanced soils increase soil biological activity and reduce weed growth and pest attack. The reduction of weeds and pests can be directly attributed to an increase in soil biological activity and subsequent crop health, hence the only factor to consider is whether BCSR can directly increase soil micro-organism diversity and activity.

While some bacteria have been observed metabolising raw elements directly in extreme circumstances, and mycorrhizal fungi have been found to extract minerals from bedrock, the overwhelming majority of soil organisms subsist exclusively on organic matter. Hence, any changes in mineral balance in the soil are unlikely to affect soil organism populations beyond the effects expected by altering pH.

Studies have backed this up—Schonbeck showed that a reduction of Mg saturation had no detectable effect on soil organic matter, biological activity, weed growth, or incidence of disease. Kelling concluded that the Ca:Mg ratio had no significant effect on earthworm population or weed growth.

Schonbeck concluded that: "Findings to date do not support the application of a single formula for optimum base saturation ratio to all soils."

== BCSR in practice ==
There are claimed to be over a million acres (4,000 km^{2}) of farmland worldwide using some kind of BCSR theory for balancing their soils, and the testimonies of farmers seem to back it up as a practical method. However, BCSR is almost always used by farmers transitioning to sustainable agriculture, hence the simultaneous use of other soil improvement methods (such as cover crops, reduced tillage, and addition of organic matter) makes it difficult to isolate the effects of the BCSR method. Many BCSR practitioners stress that the system cannot work when abstracted from a 'holistic' approach to farming. Though this complicates investigation, it does not invalidate the approach, since many other aspects of sustainable agriculture only work in concert with each other. For example, integrated pest management requires the use of polycultures, cover crops, reduction of pesticides and even agroforestry to a degree, and its efficacy will be greatly reduced if all these things are ignored.

The 2001 results of a 3-year field trial sponsored by the Sustainable Agriculture Research and Education (SARE) organisation are the only side by side comparison of BCSR vs SLAN performed by farmers using recommendations from laboratories that specialise in each method. The study found that on average the fertiliser costs were $9.27 per acre higher per year using the BCSR method, with no higher yield. They concluded that the BCSR method would not be more profitable, even when factoring in the price premiums for organic produce. They also admitted it could take decades of such fertilising to attain the 'optimal' levels of BCSR systems. Another study found BCSR costs to be double that of conventional fertilisation.

Concerns have also been raised that applying the BCSR methods to low CEC soils could lead to mineral deficiency because there are no minimum levels defined as meq/100g of soil. Hence, in very low CEC soils the amount of a certain element—though in correct proportion to others—may be too low for the needs of the crop. Another concern is that applications of CaCO_{3} and CaSO_{4} can lead to an overestimation of CEC. Aside from these worries, the general consensus is that the only negative effects for farmers using BCSR will be the unnecessary expense which could have been better spent on other sustainable agricultural practices whose benefits are well studied.

== Conclusions ==
Much of the research in favour of BCSR can be adequately explained by changes in pH. Liming soil is well known to improve microbial activity, soil structure, nitrogen fixation, and palatability of forages. It is also used to correct Ca and Mg deficiencies, change nutrient availability and reduce manganese and aluminium toxicity that can retard crop growth. While fertiliser recommendations based on BCSR continue to be in widespread use by private soil testing laboratories, the evidence on balance suggests there is no benefit to crop yield or quality. Any perceived change is likely to be due to correction of deficiencies (which would have been picked up by the SLAN method) or the result of other beneficial soil practices used in conjunction, when transitioning to sustainable agriculture.

In his 2001 study on the Albrecht method, Schonbeck stated "A review of over 100 published studies and conversations with several soils consultants revealed evidence that proper cation balancing is inherently site specific. Most soils apparently do not need to conform to the Albrecht formula to be healthy and productive."
