= Wylie Gustafson =

American singer-songwriter (born 1961)

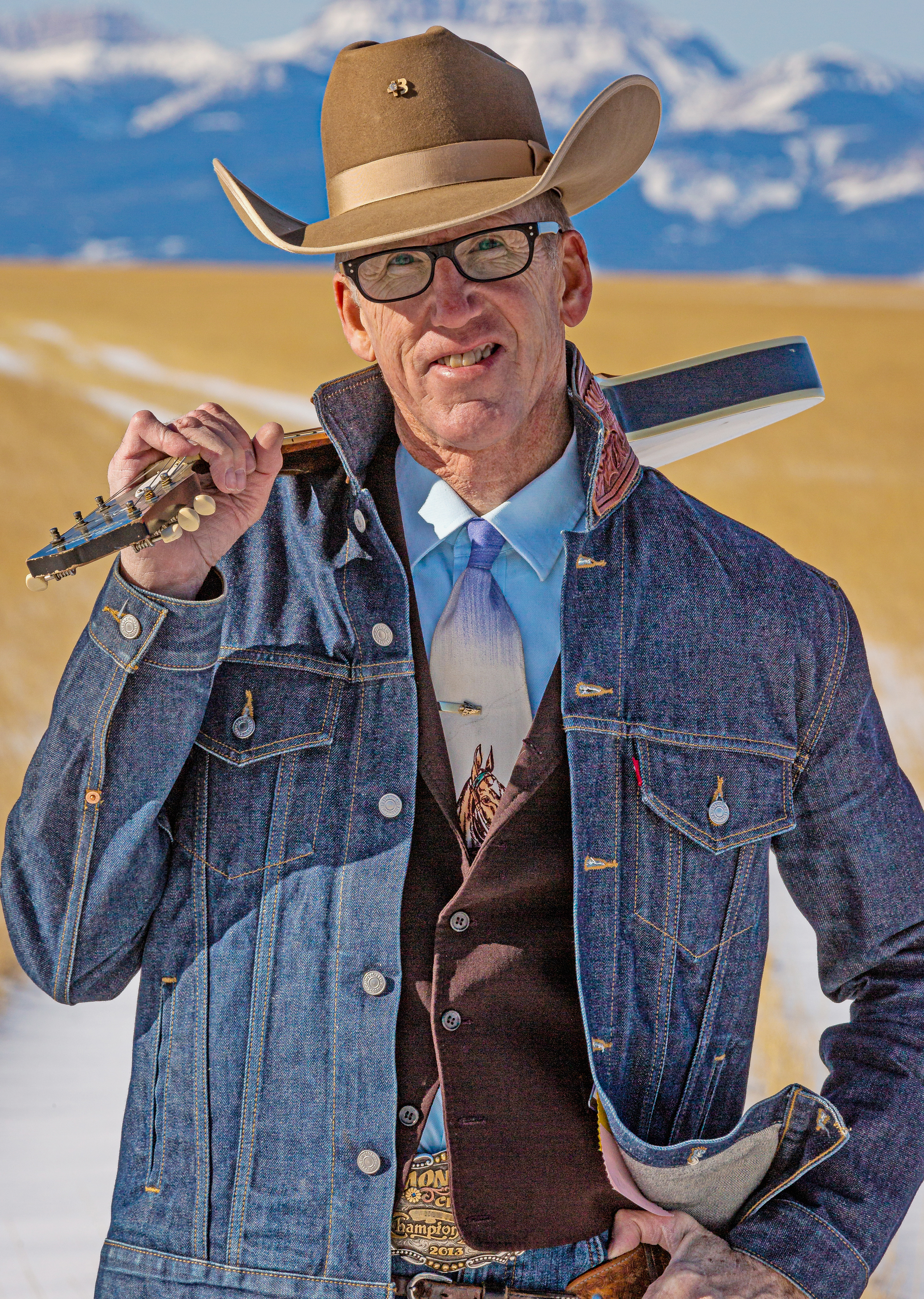
- Gustafson in March 2022

Background information
- Born: Wylie Galt Gustafson; June 7, 1961 (age 65); Conrad, Montana, U.S.
- Genres: Country, cowboy, folk, yodeling
- Occupation: Yodeler Singer Songwriter Cowboy Horseman
- Years active: 1988–present
- Website: Wylie & the Wild West

Wylie Galt Gustafson (born June 7, 1961) is an American singer-songwriter who has toured nationally and internationally with his band, "Wylie & The Wild West". The band is known for its blend of cowboy, traditional country, folk and yodeling. Wylie is renowned for his creation of the ubiquitous Yahoo! yodel used in the tech company's worldwide advertising campaign. Gustafson is a fourth generation Montana cowboy and is a 2019 inductee into the Montana Cowboy Hall of Fame. He is the younger brother of Lieutenant Governor of Montana Kristen Juras.

== Life and career ==
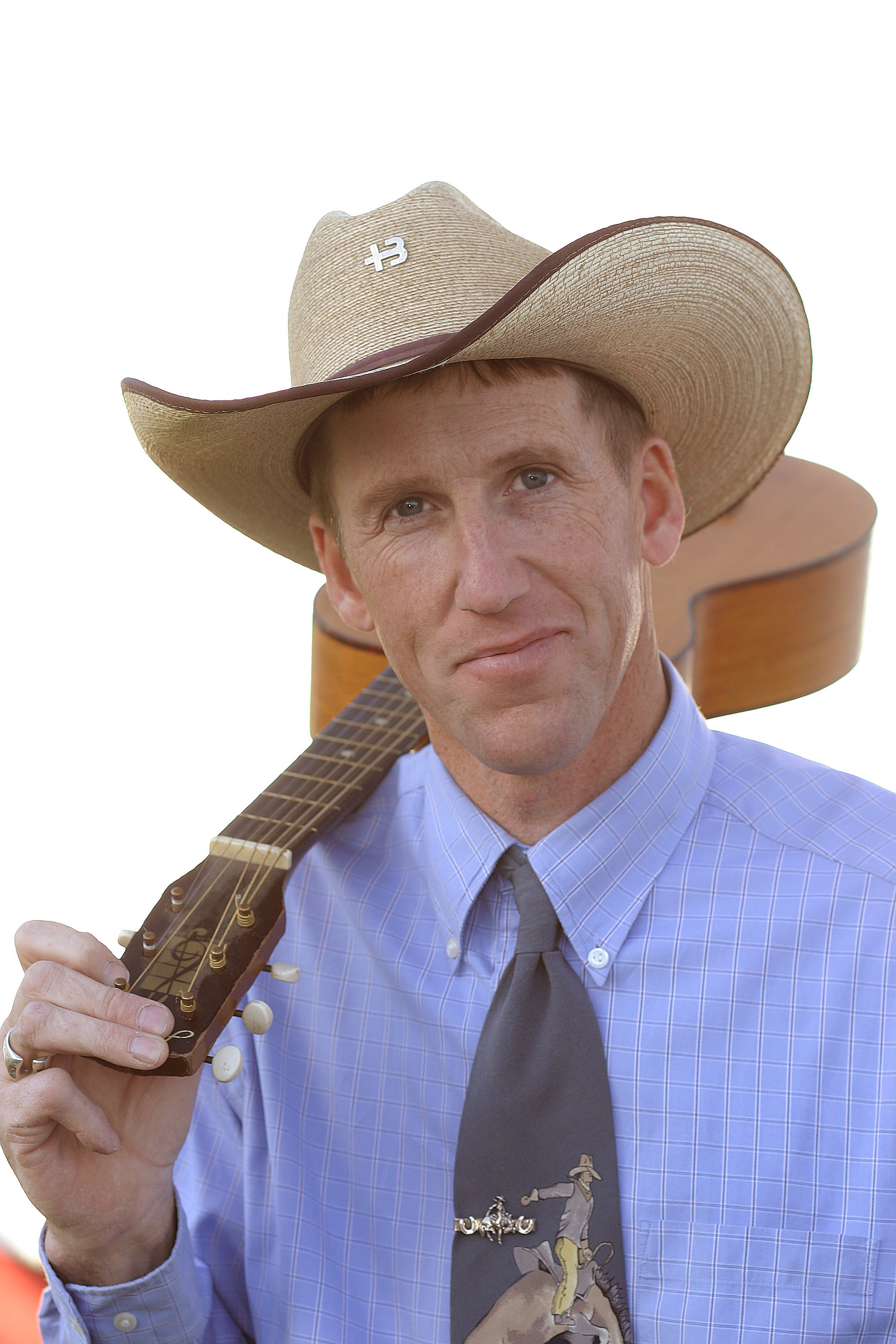
Gustafson in 2004

Gustafson was born June 7, 1961, near Conrad, Montana, the son of R.W. "Rib" Gustafson, a traditional folk/cowboy singer, retired large-animal veterinarian, and author. The elder Gustafson, who taught his son to sing and yodel, learned to yodel from Austrians on the ski team at Montana State College (now Montana State University), Bozeman, Montana. Among Rib's credits are two books (Under the Chinook Arch, Room to Roam) about his life as a pioneering Montana veterinarian.

Wylie Gustafson founded his band, The Wild West Show, in 1988, in Los Angeles at the Palomino Club where they were regulars on Ronnie Mack's Barn Dance. It was there that Gustafson showcased the first version of the Wild West Show which then included guitarist Will Ray. The group developed their sound alongside artists such as Dale Watson, Lucinda Williams, Dwight Yoakam, Rosie Flores and Dave Alvin.

Gustafson is particularly noted as a virtuoso yodeler, having originated the slow and ethereal High Plains Yodeling style. He also created and voiced the signature "Yahoo-oo-oo!" for Yahoo, Inc. He later sued Yahoo! for copyright infringement over the terms of the contract and use of his yodel. The case was settled out of court for an undisclosed amount. His book and album, How to Yodel: Lessons to Tickle Your Tonsils, was published by Gibbs Smith in 2007 and is the top selling publication on the rejuvenated vocal art. As of 2016, Gustafson remains one of the top choices of yodelers and his style can be heard frequently on national advertisements, television and movies. Some major companies that have used his yodel include Yahoo!, Walt Disney Films, Porsche, Mitsubishi, Miller Lite, Taco Bell and Montana Tourism.

In 1996, Gustafson (as himself) appeared on the Cartoon Network's Space Ghost Coast to Coast (episode "Freak Show").

Gustafson is also an accomplished horseman (2005 & 2008 NCHA Western National Finals Top Ten Open Finalist) and cowboy. When not performing, he operates his Cross Three Quarter Horse Ranch near Conrad, Montana breeding, raising and training cow horses. When Gustafson was young, he was a competitive team roper. Sometimes when at home at his ranch, he participates in roping contests at local ranches. In 1998, he was a champion team roper at the Reba McEntire/Ben Johnson Celebrity Rodeo.

On April 25, 2007, "Montana Lullaby" was declared the official lullaby of Montana. A yodel by Gustafson was used to write the lullaby. As a result, Montana was the first state to have an official lullaby.

In October 2019, Wylie was named as an inductee into the Montana Cowboy Hall of Fame.

Gustafson continues to front Wylie & the Wild West Show and they continue to record and tour on a regular basis performing 60–80 shows a year on average. Wylie & the Wild West Show have released twenty-one albums through March 2024.

== Personal life ==
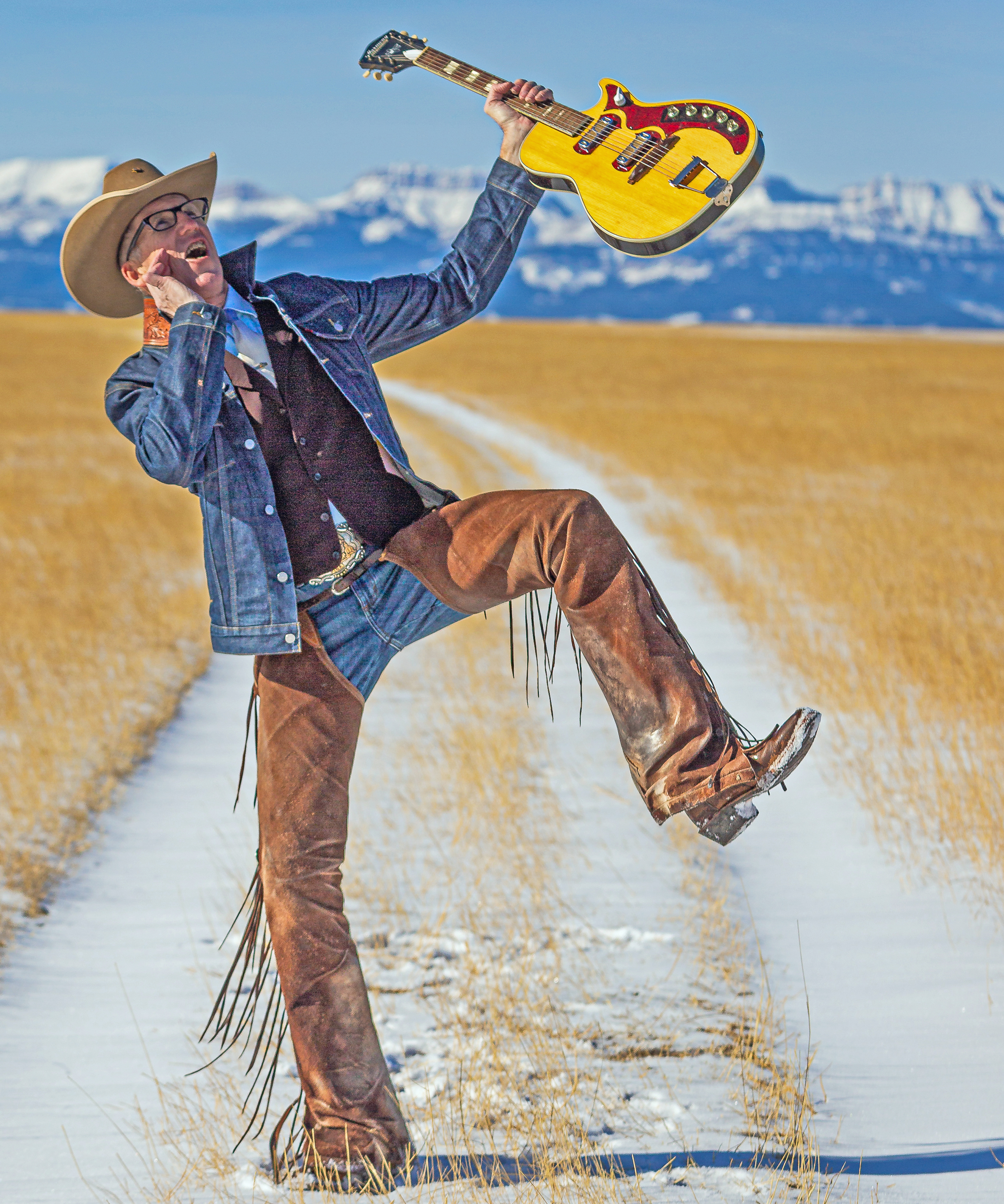
Wylie on his Montana ranch

Wylie currently resides at his horse and cattle ranch in northern Montana with his wife Jenny and 3 children. His older sister, Kristen Juras, is the current lieutenant governor of Montana. Gustafson also has a brother, Erik, who performed at the 2018 International Blues Challenge Competition.

== Notable appearances ==
- Grand Ole Opry, WSM Radio, Nashville, Tennessee (more than 50 guest appearances)
- National Cowboy Poetry Gathering, Elko, Nevada (2000, '01, '02, '03, '04, '05, '06, '07, '08, '09, '10, '11, '12, '13, '14, '15, '16, '18, '19, '20, '21)
- National Folk Festival 2022
- Montana Cowboy Hall of Fame Induction 2019
- Montana Pro Rodeo Wall and Hall of Fame 2017
- American Routes to China Tour 2015
- CMC Rocks Australia Country Music Festival 2015
- Thredbo Country Music Festival Australia 2015
- American Routes to China Tour 2013
- Yahoo! on the Road Summer 2013 promotional tour for Yahoo!
- God Made a Farmer Dodge television advertisement. January 2013 & 2014 Super Bowl commercial
- Merlefest- Wilkesboro, NC -April 2012. Wylie featured in Songwriter Showcase with Jim Lauderdale and Claire Lynch
- Horse Talk with Lizzie Iwerson- RFD TV 2012
- American Seasons Tour in Russia sponsored by The American Folklife Center and CEC Arts Link- March thru April 2012
- Don't Fence Me In West Coast tour hosted by the National Council for Traditional Arts- March 2012
- Push the Button, hosted by Ant and Dec (2010 season debut)
- Gold Coast Casino, Las Vegas, Nevada, during the Wrangler National Finals Rodeo (2008, 2009)
- The National Folk Festival
- Lowell Folk Festival
- Bangor Folk Festival
- Great Lakes Folk Festival
- Richmond, VA Folk Festival
- Late Night with Conan O'Brien (2008)
- A Prairie Home Companion (2006, 2010)
- Lincoln Center
- The Kennedy Center
- The Los Angeles Music Center
- Western Folklife Center tour of Brazil and Argentina 2007
- Country Gold Festival, Kumamoto, Japan
- Tom Russell's Vancouver-to-Toronto Canadian Cow Train (2005, 2007)
- Merlefest, Wilkesboro, North Carolina (2002, 2010, 2012)
- Bumbershoot International Music & Arts Festival, Seattle, Washington
- Equiblues Festival, St. Agreve, France
- Personal Appearance with lines in the movie "Slaughter Rule"
- Space Ghost Coast to Coast (1996 episode: "Freak Show")

== Discography ==
=== Albums ===
| Year | Album |
|---|---|
| 1992 | Wylie & the Wild West Show |
| 1994 | Get Wild |
| 1996 | Glory Trail: Cowboy & Traditional Gospel Songs |
| 1996 | Cattle Call |
| 1997 | Way out West |
| 1998 | Total Yodel! |
| 2000 | Ridin' the Hi-Line |
| 2001 | Paradise |
| 2004 | Hooves of the Horses |
| 2004 | Cowboy Ballads and Dance Songs |
| 2005 | Live! at the Tractor |
| 2007 | Bucking Horse Moon |
| 2007 | Christmas for Cowboys |
| 2008 | Yodel Boogie! |
| 2009 | Hang -n- Rattle! |
| 2009 | Unwired: Western Warehouse Jubilee Live |
| 2011 | Raven on the Wind |
| 2012 | Rocketbuster |
| 2013 | Sky Tones- Songs of Montana |
| 2014 | Relic |
| 2015 | Song of the Horse |
| 2017 | 2000 Miles from Nashville |
| 2019 | Cowboy Vernacular- Songs of the Ranch Culture |
| 2022 | Bunchgrass |

=== Singles ===
| Year | Single | Chart Positions | Album |
| Year | Single | CAN AC | Album |
|---|---|---|---|
| 1994 | "Ugly Girl Blues" | 38 | Get Wild |
| 1995 | "Hey Maria" | — | Get Wild |
| 1995 | "Cattle Call" | — | Cattle Call |
| 1998 | "Girl on the Billboard" | — | Way out West |
| 2001 | "Saddle Burn" | — | Paradise |

=== Music videos ===
| Year | Video | Director |
|---|---|---|
| 1992 | "This Time" | Randy Cohen |
| 1993 | "Doctor My Heart" | Brooks Dailey |
| 1993 | "Black Boots and Blue Jeans" | Mitchell Cohen |
| 1993 | "Yodeling Fool" | |
| 1994 | "Ugly Girl Blues" | |
| 1995 | "Hey Maria" | |
| 1995 | "Cattle Call" | |
| 1998 | "Girl on the Billboard" | |
| 2005 | "Live! at the Tractor Tavern" | Brian Barnett |
