= Baxter Black =

American cowboy poet and veterinarian (1945–2022)

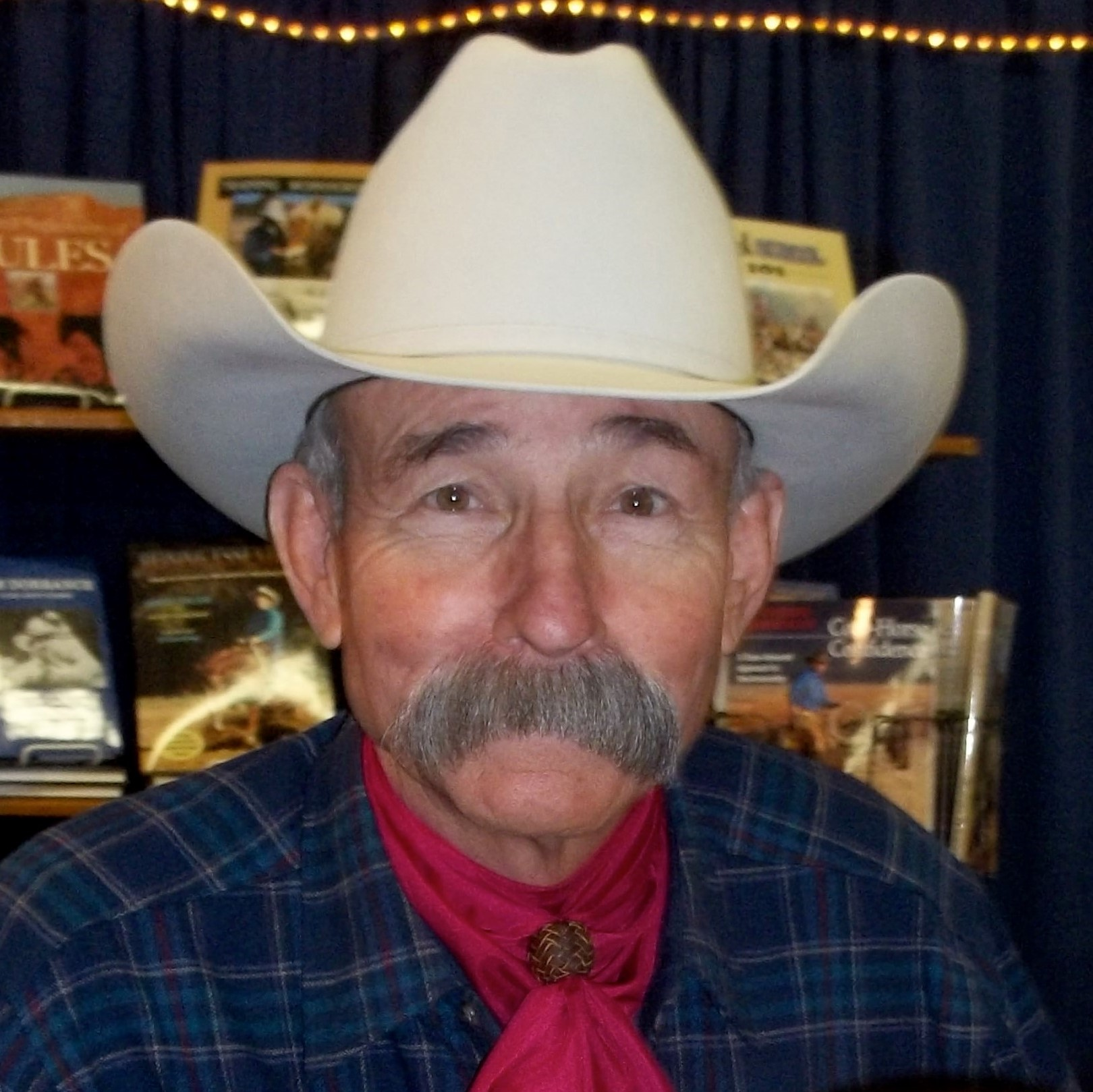
- Black in 2012
- Born: January 10, 1945; Brooklyn Naval Hospital, Brooklyn, New York, U.S.
- Died: June 10, 2022 (aged 77); Benson, Arizona, U.S.
- Education: Doctor of Veterinary Medicine
- Alma mater: Colorado State University
- Occupations: Cattle Feeder; Cowboy poet; Columnist; Novelist; Philosopher; Publisher – Coyote Cowboy Company; Raconteur; National Public Radio Commentator; Former large animal Veterinarian
- Spouse: Cindy Lou
- Children: Jennifer and Guy
- Relatives: Parents: Robert and Theodora Black
- Writing career
- Years active: 1965–2022
- Genre: Cowboy Poetry
- Subjects: Cowboy and ranch life
- Notable works: On the Edge of Commonsense; Coyote Cowboy Poetry; Croutons on a Cowpie
- Website: baxterblack.com

Baxter Black (January 10, 1945 – June 10, 2022) was an American cowboy poet and veterinarian. He wrote over 30 books of poetry, fiction—both novels and children's literature—and commentary, selling over two million books, CDs, and DVDs.

== Biography ==
Black was born in Brooklyn Naval Hospital, Brooklyn, New York, but grew up in Las Cruces, New Mexico. In high school, he became the Future Farmers of America (FFA) president, the senior class president, and lettered in wrestling one year. He began riding bulls in rodeos while in high school, and continued riding throughout college. Black received his undergraduate degree at New Mexico State University, and completed veterinary school at Colorado State University, graduating in 1969. He was a practicing veterinarian from 1969 to 1982, specializing in large animals, such as cows and horses. During the last two years of his veterinary career, Black gained popularity through public speaking with over 250 appearances. After this, his career as a poet began. Black also hosted the public television series Baxter Black and Friends.

He wrote a column, spoke on the radio, and had short segments on RFD-TV and The Cowboy Channel. He resided in Benson, Arizona, with his wife, Cindy Lou, where they had no cell phone, television, or fax machine. One of his philosophies of life claims: "In spite of all the computerized, digitalized, high-tech innovations of today, there will always be a need for a cowboy." When asked what made him decide to become a cowboy, he said, "You either are one, or you aren't. You never have to decide."

In late 2021, Black retired from writing and speaking engagements because of health issues. Black's wife, Cindy Lou, reported on January 15, 2022, that he was in hospice care. His son-in-law explained, however, that the hospice consisted of a home health care worker checking on Black every few days because of various medical issues.

Black died from leukemia on June 10, 2022, at his residence in Benson, Arizona, aged 77.

== Radio ==
Black's radio career began as a chance occurrence. During a news-worthy local event, he submitted some of his work to a radio station. Black specified in an interview, "It was the year Yellowstone caught on fire, 1988. We were listening and they didn't have any coverage to speak of, and it was a huge deal in our life. It was a huge deal in Colorado (where I lived) and the sky smelled like smoke and I had this big tumultuous poem about range fire... So I sent them this. I just sent it to "Public Radio" in Washington D.C. And two or three days later I get a call back."

Baxter was a regular commentator for 20 years on NPR beginning in the early '80s, he was a regular commentator for National Public Radio's Morning Edition. Baxter Black on Monday, the weekly syndicated radio program, was on the air since 1989, and his weekly syndicated column, On the Edge of Common Sense, was carried by more than 150 publications.

Television:

Black appeared six times on the Tonight Show with Johnny Carson from 1987 to 1992. He also appeared on Iowa Public Television in 1993. These performances are available on double DVD entitled: "Baxter Black Live on The Tonight Show with Johnny Carson" and on Iowa Public Television".[1} Live From Benson, Arizona: Baxter Black - C&I Magazine

== Bibliography ==
Books
Title	Genre	Publisher	Year
The Cowboy and His Dog : or, "Go, Git in the Pickup!"	Poetry	Record Stockman Press	1980
A Rider, a Roper and a Heck'uva Windmill Man	Poetry	Record Stockman Press	1982
On the Edge of Common Sense : the Best So Far	Poetry	Record Stockman Press	1983
Doc, While Yer Here	Poetry	Record Stockman Press	1984
Cowboy and Sourdough Buckaroo History	Poetry	Record Stockman Press	1985
Coyote Cowboy Poetry	Poetry	Record Stockman Press	1986
Croutons on a Cow-Pie	Poetry	Record Stockman Press	1988
The Buckskin Mare	Poetry	Record Stockman Press	1989
There's Mountain Time, There's Daylight; Savings Time, and Cowboy Standard Time	Poetry	Record Stockman Press	1990
Hey, Cowboy, Wanna Get Lucky?	Fiction	Record Stockman Press	1990
Croutons on a Cow-Pie II	Poetry	Coyote Cowboy Co.	1992
Dunny and the Duck	Poetry	Coyote Cowboy Co.	1994
Cow Attack	Poetry	Coyote Cowboy Co.	1996
Cactus Tracks & Cowboy Philosophy	Literary Collection	Penguin Books	1997
Loose Cow Party	Poetry & Anecdotes	Coyote Cowboy Co.	1998
A Cowful of Cowboy Poetry	Poetry	Coyote Cowboy Co.	2000
Storey's Guide to Raising Beef Cattle	Livestock; Forward only	Storey Books	2000
Cowboy Mentality: And the Big One That Got Away Blues	Poetry	Coyote Cowboy Co.	2001
Horseshoes, Cowsocks, and Duckfeet: More Commentary by NPR's Cowboy Poet & Former Large Animal Veterinarian	Commentary	Crown Publishers	2002
Baxter Black's Ag Man : the Comic Book	Graphic Novel	Coyote Cowboy Co.	2003
Hey, Cowgirl, Need a Ride?	Fiction	Crown Publishers	2005
The West; Limited Edition of 50	Poetry	Poetry Center of Chicago	2005
Blazin' Bloats and Cows on FIRE! or, It's Hard to Blow Out a Holstein	Poetry	Coyote Cowboy Co.	2006
The World According to Baxter Black: Quips, Quirks and Quotes	Poetry	Coyote Cowboy Co.	2008
The Back Page: the Best of Baxter Black From Western Horseman	Literary Collection	Coyote Cowboy Co.	2009
Rudolph's Night Off	Children's Poetry	Coyote Cowboy Co.	2011
Lessons From a Desperado Poet with Wilford Brimley	Literary Collection	TwoDot	2012
Ride, Cowboy, Ride! 8 Seconds Ain't That Long	Fiction	TwoDot	2012
Reindeer Flu	Poetry	Children's Fiction	2013
Poems Worth Saving	Poetry	Coyote Cowboy Co.	2013
Cave Wall Graffiti from a Neanderthal Cowboy	Poetry	Coyote Cowboy Co.	2014
National Cowboy Poetry Gathering: An Anthology	Poetry	Lyons Press	2014
Tinsel, Mistletoe and Reindeer Bait	Poetry	Coyote Cowboy Co.	2016
Scrambled Wisdom	Poetry & Anecdotes	Coyote Cowboy Co.	2017
A Commotion in Rhyme	Poetry	Coyote Cowboy Co.	2018

== See also ==
- Waddie Mitchell
- Red Steagall
- Will Rogers
- John R. Erickson
- Kinky Friedman
