= Joel Nelson =

Cowboy poet

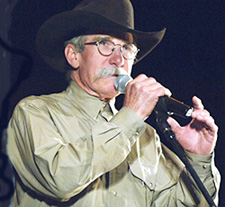
Joel Nelson reciting a poem at the 25th anniversary of the National Cowboy Poetry Gathering in 2009.

Joel Nelson is a cowboy poet.

He is a recipient of a 2009 National Heritage Fellowship awarded by the National Endowment for the Arts, which is the United States government's highest honor in the folk and traditional arts.
