= Ray Troll =

American artist and musician (born 1954)

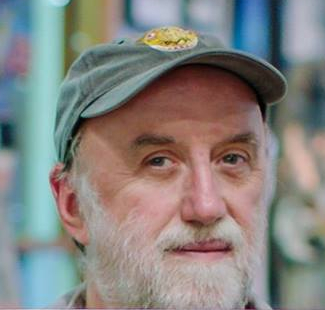
- Ray Troll in 2017
- Born: Raymond Michael Troll; March 4, 1954 (age 72); Corning, New York, U.S.
- Education: MFA
- Alma mater: Washington State University
- Spouse: Michelle Troll
- Website: trollart.com

Ray Troll (born March 4, 1954) is an American artist based in Ketchikan, Alaska. He is best known for his scientifically accurate and often humorous artwork. His most well-known design is "Spawn Till You Die", which has appeared in many places including the film Superbad and being worn by actor Daniel Radcliffe.

Troll's renditions of everything from salmon to marine mammals to creatures only found in the fossil record have become iconic in fishing, scientific, and environmental activism communities around the world. He seeks inspiration from extensive field work in marine science, paleontology, geology, ecology, and evolutionary biology. His paintings and mixed-media drawings are in the collections of the Phillip and Patricia Frost Museum of Science, the Burke Museum of Natural History and Culture, Alaska Airlines, the Anchorage Museum, the Alaska State Museum, and the Ketchikan Museum.

He has collaborated once again with Kirk Johnson, a director with the Smithsonian's Museum of Natural History. Entitled Cruisin' the Fossil Coastline: The Travels of an Artist and a Scientist along the Shores of the Prehistoric Pacific.

In 2002, the ratfish Hydrolagus trolli was named after him in recognition of his efforts to raise awareness of ratfish.

== Awards ==
- 2005 Excellence in Public Outreach Award from the American Fisheries Society
- 2006 Alaska Governor's Award for the Arts
- 2007 Gold Medal for Distinction in Natural History Art from Academy of Natural Sciences of Drexel University
- 2008 Honorary Doctorate in Fine Arts from the University of Alaska Southeast
- 2011 John Simon Guggenheim Memorial Foundation Fellowship
- 2011 Distinguished Artist Award from the Rasmuson Foundation
- 2013 Geosciences in the Media Award from the American Association of Petroleum Geologists
- 2014 Ocean Ambassador Award from the Alaska SeaLife Center
- 2015 Katherine Palmer Award from the Paleontological Research Institution

== Books ==
- Planet Ocean: A Story of Life, the Sea, and Dancing to the Fossil Record (Pictures by Troll, Words by Brad Matsen, 1994, Ten Speed)
- Raptors, Fossils, Fins, and Fangs (Troll and Brad Matsen, 1995, Tricycle)
- Life's A Fish and Then You Fry, An Alaskan Seafood Cookbook (Author Randy Bayliss, Illustrations by Troll, 2002, Alaska Northwest)
- Sharkabet: A Sea of Sharks from A to Z (2002, Alaska Northwest)
- Rapture of the Deep, the Art of Ray Troll (2004, University of California Press, Introduction by David James Duncan and essay by Brad Matsen)
- Cruisin' the Fossil Freeway (with Kirk Johnson, 2006, Fulcrum)
- Something Fishy This Way Comes (2010, Sasquatch)
- Cruisin' the Fossil Coastline: The Travels of an Artist and a Scientist along the Shores of the Prehistoric Pacific (with Kirk Johnson), 2018, Fulcrum Publishing ISBN 1555917437

== Music ==
Troll is a lifelong music aficionado and musician. He and his band, the Ratfish Wranglers, play festival, saloon, and dance party dates from Alaska to California, appearing at Salmonfest (formerly Salmonstock) in Ninilchik, Alaska, the Fisher Poets Gathering in Astoria, Oregon, and many other events around the Pacific Northwest.

=== Discography ===
- Fish Worship (2015, Troll, Russell Wodehouse and Ratfish Wranglers)
- Cruisin' The Fossil Freeway (2009, Troll, Wodehouse and Ratfish Wranglers)
- Where The Fins Meet The Frets (2007, Troll and the Ratfish Wranglers)
- Dancing To The Fossil Record (1995, music composed by Wodehouse to accompany Planet Ocean, Dancing to the Fossil Record exhibit)
