= Livestock feeder (person) =

A cattle feeder is a farmer who buys or rears cattle to add weight and quality to the cattle for the meat industry.
