= Katrina Porteous =

British poet, historian and broadcaster

- Born: 1960 (age 65–66); Aberdeen, Scotland
- Citizenship: Scotland
- Education: Trinity Hall, Cambridge
- Occupation: Poet
- Writing career
- Notable work: Two Countries
- Notable awards: Eric Gregory Award

Katrina Porteous (born 1960 in Aberdeen) is a Scottish poet, historian and broadcaster. Her particular interests include the inshore fishing community of the Northumberland coast, and the cultural and natural history of that area.

== Biography ==
Katrina Porteous was born in Aberdeen, Scotland in 1960. She grew up in County Durham. She studied history at Cambridge, graduating in 1982. Afterwards, she studied in the USA on a Harkness Fellowship. In 1989 she won an Eric Gregory Award, and has since received awards from Arts Council England and the Arts Foundation.

Many of the poems in her first collection, The Lost Music (Bloodaxe Books, 1996), focus on a Northumbrian fishing community. Her prose books on the subject include The Bonny Fisher Lad (People’s History, 2003) and Limekilns and Lobster Pots (Jardine Press, 2013). She also writes in Northumbrian dialect, as in The Wund an’ the Wetter, recorded on CD with piper Chris Ormston (Iron Press, 1999). She is President of the Northumbrian Language Society, and an ambassador for New Networks for Nature.

Since 2000 she has specialised in radio poetry, much of it with BBC producer Julian May. Works include Longshore Drift, Dunstanburgh and The Refuge Box. Her second full-length collection from Bloodaxe Books, Two Countries (2014), includes some of these poems. She has been involved in many collaborations with other artists and musicians. In 2000 she worked with composer Alistair Anderson on the musical Tam Lin. Most recently, she has collaborated with digital composer Peter Zinovieff on Horse (2011, about the 3,000-year-old Uffington White Horse), and Edge (2013, a poem in four moons for the Centre for Life planetarium, Newcastle). In August 2017, she collaborated with the composer and performer Alexis Bennett on "Sea, Sky, Stars" at Dartington International Festival.

Porteous' collection Edge (Bloodaxe, 2019) was drawn from for a Poetry Please broadcast on Radio 4, and the collection is orchestrated by her effort to address the complexities of science - from the microscopic attributes of the quantum level, to the expanses of space - through the medium of poetry. This collection is in keeping with the drive of Porteous' previous poetry projects, in that there is attention to the subject she has chosen with some deliberation to place before herself, along with a persistent and instinctual drive to deliver to the reader a regular stream of metaphors and images that are equal to the quality of insight she has arrived at, often through meticulous research. This book may be the first of hers to investigate a scientific subject intensively and extensively, but it follows her ongoing programme of close observation and her strategy of using commissions and chosen subject areas as primal sources for the production of arresting and memorable imagery.
