= Western Folklife Center =

Cultural center

The Western Folklife Center is a nonprofit cultural center in Elko, Nevada that hosts exhibits, theater, music, and poetry events that celebrate the history and landscape of the American West. Every year the center hosts the National Cowboy Poetry Gathering.

== History ==
The center was founded as the Utah Folklife Center, in 1980 by Hal Cannon. In 1985, it became the Western Folklife Center, expanding its focus to the wider rural culture and history of the Western US.

It contains a 300-seat theater and a 20-seat black box theater in addition to the gallery space.

The center is headquartered in the Pioneer Building, a historic hotel, office building, and saloon built in 1912–1913. The site of the building in 1868 was the location of the first saloon in Elko, which was in a tent. The old saloon room with its 40-foot bar, built in 1890 of mahogany and cherry wood with mother-of-pearl inlay, is a celebrated feature of the center. It is used as a proper bar during special events.

From 2000 to 2012, the center produced the radio program Deep West Radio for National Public Radio.

Every year, the center hosts a youth festival the week before the official Cowboy Poetry Festival.
