= Clemens Starck =

American poet (1937–2024)

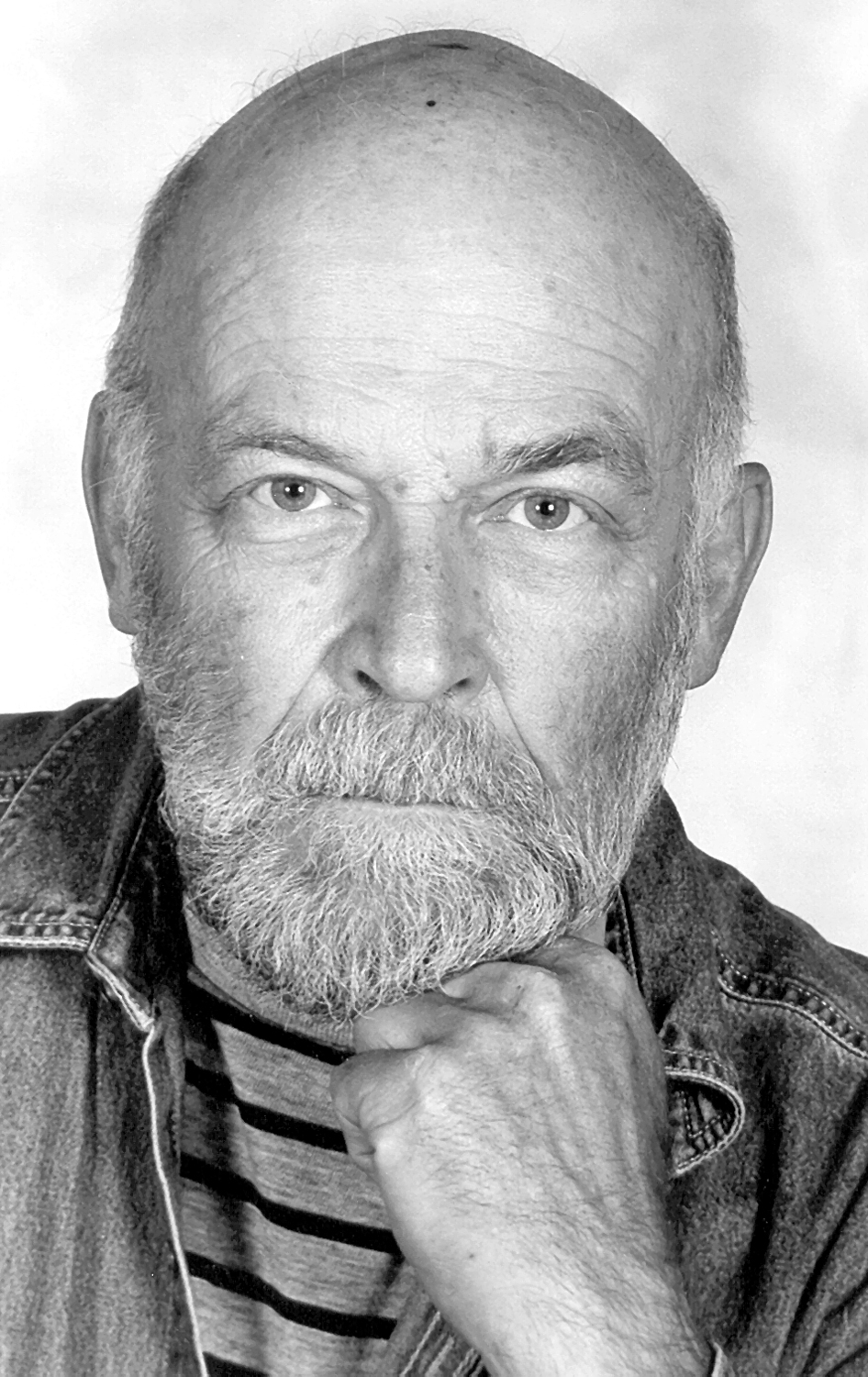
- Born: November 30, 1937
- Died: March 21, 2024 (aged 86)
- Occupation: Poet
- Writing career
- Notable awards: Oregon Book Award (1996)

Clemens Starck (November 30, 1937– March 21, 2024) was an American poet.

He is the author of seven books of poems, and recipient of the 1996 William Stafford Memorial Poetry Award and the Oregon Book Award for Journeyman's Wages. Two of his other books were also finalists for the Oregon Book Award.

Several of his poems, including "One of the Locals", were read by Garrison Keillor on The Writer's Almanac. A chapter dedicated to Starck's poetry, “Clemens Starck: ‘poems in my head, a hammer in my hand,” is within Durable Goods: Appreciations of Oregon Poets, written by Erik Muller and published by Mountains & Rivers Press in 2017.

Jon Broderick, founder of the annual FisherPoets Gathering in Astoria, Oregon, cites Starck as the inspiration for the festival. "Clem wrote poetry about work. I had never considered doing that. I immediately thought about the fishermen I knew who wrote, and decided to get a few people together to give it a try."

In 2018, Empty Bowl a small independent Pacific Northwest press, initiated a new series focused on collected and selected poems from Pacific Northwest writers. The series was launched with Finn Wilcox's Too Late to Turn Back Now: Prose and Poems. Starck's Cathedrals and Parking Lots: Collected Poems is the second book in this series.

== Death ==
He died, age 86, on March 21, 2024.

== Works ==
=== Poetry ===
- Journeyman’s Wages (Story Line Press, 1995)
- Studying Russian on Company Time (Silverfish Review Press, 1999)
- China Basin (Story Line Press, 2002)
- Traveling Incognito (Wood Works, 2004)
- Rembrandt, Chainsaw (Wood Works, 2011)
- Old Dogs, New Tricks (Oblio, 2016)
- Cathedrals and Parking Lots: Collected Poems (Empty Bowl, November 2018)

=== Audio CDs ===
- Looking for Parts (2008)
- Getting It Straight (2013)

=== Selected anthologies ===
- Good Poems for Hard Times, ed. Keillor (Penguin, 2006)
- From Here We Speak: An Anthology of Oregon Poetry, ed. St. John (Oregon State University Press, 1993)
- Where is Vietnam? American Poets Respond, ed. Lowenfels (Doubleday Anchor, 1967)
- Poetry Daily: 366 Poems from the World’s Most Popular Poetry Website, eds. Boller and Selby (Sourcebooks, 2003)
- Paperwork: Contemporary Poems from the Job, ed. Wayman (Harbour, 1991)
