= Western Livestock Journal =

- Type: Trade weekly newspaper
- Owner: Crow Publicationa
- Founder: Nelson R. Crow
- Founded: 1922
- Language: English
- Headquarters: Greenwood Village, Colorado
- Website: www.wlj.net

The Western Livestock Journal is a weekly livestock industry newspaper. Originally called the Farm and Ranch Market Journal, it was started by Nelson R. Crow in 1922 and is published by Crow Publications.

== History ==
The Farm and Ranch Market Journal became Western Livestock Journal in the early 1930s. In 1952, Nelson purchased Livestock Magazine from the Biggs family in Denver. The two weeklies were combined in the ’70s to create one national edition of Western Livestock Journal and the monthly magazine was renamed Livestock Magazine, and split into three editorial editions. Livestock Magazine ceased publication in the early ’80s.

== Today ==
Crow Publications publishes the Northwest American Bull Guide magazine (yearly), the Commercial Cattle Issue (yearly), the Properties Ranch & Home magazine (quarterly), as well as the Western Livestock Journal (weekly). Crow Publications/Western Livestock Journal is located in Greenwood Village (CO, United States).
