= National Cowboy Poetry Gathering =

Annual cowboy poetry celebration in Elko, Nevada, U.S.

Coordinates: 40.844328°N 115.754093°W

- Location: Nevada
- Country: United States
- Inaugurated: 1985
- Founder: Sarah Sweetwater and her friends started the Folklife Festival in the Elko park in the 1970s. She wanted to keep cowboy culture alive by recording cowboy poets and when the event began to grow, she hired Hal Cannon to help with the business and marketing.

The National Cowboy Poetry Gathering (formerly: Elko Cowboy Poetry Gathering), is an annual gathering celebrating cowboy poetry produced by the Western Folklife Center, that takes place in Elko, Nevada, United States.

== History ==
William Wilson secured funding for the event from the National Endowment for the Arts in 1985. Organized by a team of folklorists and local cowboy poets including Hal Cannon and Waddie Mitchell, the Elko Cowboy Poetry Gathering started in 1985 as a place where Western ranchers and cowboys could gather to share poems about their lives working cattle.

From the beginning, it was clear these men and women had found their tribe, an artistic community that few knew existed. Three decades later, the tribe is now a nation of Western poets, musicians, artisans and storytellers, telling stories of hard work, heartbreak, hilarity, and what it means to make one's way in the rangeland West. The "Elko Gathering" was renamed the "National Cowboy Poetry Gathering" thanks to an act of Congress in 1980.

Known simply as Elko to many, the gathering embraces its role as a pilgrimage destination for thousands of ranchers and Western enthusiasts to come and learn the art that grows from a connection to the rhythms of earth and sky. The National Cowboy Poetry Gathering is six days of poetry, music, dancing, workshops, exhibits, conversations, food and fellowship, rooted in tradition but focused on today's rural West.

The inaugural year featured 40 poets, and an audience of less than 1,000. At the 25th anniversary gathering in 2009, retired U.S. Supreme Court Justice Sandra Day O'Connor was the keynote speaker. Other well known speakers who have given the keynote address include Temple Grandin, Stuart Udall and Barry Corbin. The invited artist participants list is long, and has included Don Edwards, Waddie Mitchell, Joel Nelson, Wallace McRae, Riders in the Sky, Georgie Sicking, Dalton Wilcox, Ian Tyson, and Baxter Black.

The Elko Gathering led the way: among many other Gatherings across the nation, the Texas Cowboy Poetry Gathering, held in 1987 at Sul Ross State University in Alpine, Texas, followed the original event in Elko. Alvin G. Davis, who attended the exposition in Alpine as a cowboy poet, launched a comparable group in Lubbock with the formation in 1989 of the American Cowboy Culture Association, which co-sponsors an annual National Cowboy Symposium and Celebration held annually on the Thursday through Sunday after Labor Day.

== See also ==
- Fisher Poets Gathering
