= Waddie Mitchell =

American cowboy poet (born 1950)

Bruce Douglas "Waddie" Mitchell (born 1950 in Elko County, Nevada) is an American cowboy poet. He sometimes performs his poems with a guitarist playing in the background. Mitchell has made eight CDs including That No Quit Attitude, Lone Drifting Rider and his most recent, Sweat Equity. He and cowboy singer and friend Don Edwards released The Bard and the Balladeer Live From Cowtown. Mitchell has written four books, Waddie's Whole Load, A Cowboy's Night Before Christmas, Lone Driftin' Rider and a 2015 compilation One Hundred Poems. He was chosen to write a poem describing the West for the 2002 Winter Olympics' Olympic Arts Festival. He is a co-founder of the National Cowboy Poetry Gathering.

== Poems ==
- No Quit Attitude.
- Harsh Words.
- Dad.
- The Sum.
- Sage and Cedar.
- Piddlin' Pete.
- The Walkin' Man.
- Blood, Sweat and Steers.
- Hard Times Blues.
- Through the Pain.
- Say Goodbye to Montana.
- Desert Pete.
- Old Nighthawk.
- Saddle Tramp Philosopher.
- Experience of Life.
- Coyotes.
- Master's Call.
- Bad Half Hour/ Annie Laurie.
- Zebra Dun.
- Home on the Range.
- Owl Critic.
- Teepee.
- For Woody/ The Meadow.
- Belle of the Ball/ Last dance.
- Old Prospector/ The Journey.
- Cattle Call.
- Story With a Moral.

== See also ==
- Cowboy poetry
- List of poets
