= Cowboy poetry =

Genre of poetry and storytelling

Cowboy poetry is a form of poetry that grew from a tradition of cowboys telling stories.

== Authorship ==
Contrary to common belief, cowboy poetry does not actually have to be written by cowboys, though adherents would claim that authors should have some connection to the cowboy life such that they can write poetry with an "insider's perspective". One example of a popular "cowboy poem" written by a non-cowboy is "The Ride of Paul Venarez" by Eben E. Rexford, a 19th-Century freelance author.

== Style ==
Newcomers are surprised to hear that cowboy poetry is contemporary. Many poets tend to focus on the historic cowboy lifestyle, historical events and the humorous aspects of the cowboy life style. However, the work that cowboys do continues. The cowboy lifestyle is a living tradition that exists in western North America and other areas, thus, contemporary cowboy poetry is still being created, still being recited, and still entertaining many at cowboy poetry gatherings, around campfires and cowboy poetry competitions. Much of what is known as "old time" country music originates from the rhyming couplet style often seen in cowboy poetry along with guitar music.

== Themes ==
Typical themes of cowboy poetry include:

- Ranch work and those who perform it
- Western lifestyle
- Landscape of the American and Canadian West
- Cowboy values and practices
- Humorous anecdotes
- Memories of times and people long gone
- Sarcasm regarding modern contraptions and/or ways
- Romantics and passion

The following is a verse from LaVerna Johnson's poem "Homestead", which exhibits traditional cowboy poetry features:

We hear calls of cattle lowing, voices carry on the breeze
As it wanders down the canyon, then meanders through the trees.
While we stop to smell the sage, light shimmers "quakie's" golden leaves,
And it sure feels good to be back home again.

(Note the use of cowboy vernacular such as quakie (Populus tremuloides, trembling poplar or aspen known as a "quakie tree")).

Though it deals with those who work with livestock and nature, it would be incorrect to categorize cowboy poetry as pastoral. Cowboy poetry is noted for its romantic imagery, but at no time does it sacrifice realism in favor of it.

Few examples of experimental verse are known in cowboy poetry. One argument is that cowboy poetry is meant to be recited and should "sound like poetry." The counter-argument runs that imposing a particular structure on cowboy poetry would move the focus away from the subject matter. Regardless, most cowboy poets stay within more classical guidelines, especially rhyming verse. Free verse poetry is uncommon in cowboy poetry.

== Poetry weeks ==
Cowboy poetry continues to be written and celebrated today. Baxter Black is probably the most famous, and possibly the most prolific, contemporary cowboy poet. In addition to the National Cowboy Poetry Gathering held every year in Elko, Nevada, as well as the second largest cowboy poetry gathering, the Lone Star Cowboy Poetry Gathering, held annually in Alpine, TX, many cities in the United States and Canada have annual "roundups" dedicated to cowboy poetry. Cowboy Poetry week is celebrated each April in the United States and Canada.

== Notable cowboy poets ==
- S. Omar Barker
- Baxter Black
- Arthur Chapman
- Badger Clark
- Curley Fletcher
- Steven Fromholz
- Cathy Park Hong
- Bruce Kiskaddon
- Wally McRae
- Waddie Mitchell
- Joel Nelson
- Red Steagall
- Paul Zarzyski

In addition, Robert W. Service is sometimes classified as a cowboy poet.

Famed spoken-word artist Bingo Gazingo has done at least one cowboy poem, "Everything's OK at the OK Corral."

== See also ==
- Bush ballads
- Cowboy
- "Faster Horses (The Cowboy and the Poet)"
- Rodeo
- Western lifestyle
