= Mayisha Akbar =

American cowgirl (born 1952)

Mayisha Akbar (born Elaine Hook, October 22, 1952) established the Compton Junior Posse Youth Equestrian Program, an after-school program for inner-city children in Los Angeles, California.

== Life ==
Mayisha Akbar was born Elaine Hook in Torrance, California, on October 22, 1952.

She grew up in government housing projects in Harbor City, Los Angeles. The area is partially rural, more so in Akbar's early days. Akbar's mother says that she had an affinity for animals, especially horses. Her mother would peer out of the window to see what animal she was bringing home each day. She would also nurse sick animals back to health.

A scholarship enabled her to attend Loyola Marymount University, earning a B.A. in Sociology and Education. Akbar planned to teach after graduation. However, the real estate boom of the 1970s altered her plans. She became a real estate broker who worked in many different markets.

== Compton Jr. Posse ==
In the middle of some real estate research, she discovered an agricultural piece of Compton, California, named Richland Farms. The community has a "cowboy flavor" and combined with Akbar's affinity to horses in her childhood made owning the farm quite enticing. With a recent divorce in her past and wanting to give her three children the experiences provided by this community, it did not take her long to make a significant decision.

So, in the 1980s she moved her family into an area called Richland Farms. Akbar's children naturally made friends in the neighborhood and ended up becoming "pied pipers” to the many “latch key” children they met. As Akbar interacted with her children's new friends, she discovered that they often needed the necessities of life. Then Akbar started to supply the children with places to meet, sleepovers, fun events, and equestrian events. After these sleepovers, no parents came looking for them. Rather than ejecting the children, she told the friends that, "there’s lots of work around here and if you wanna stay and continue to ride you gotta help take care of the horses!" As time progressed, Akbar noticed that many of the friends were not in school or those in school were doing poorly. So then she told them, "If you want to continue to ride you’ve got to be in school and getting good grades. If there’s a problem we’ll get you tutoring." Akbar also realized as time went on that the boys especially needed alternatives to gangs or drugs as a life choice. The need for a formal organization became clear.

She started Compton Jr Posse in her ranch and made a difference in thousand of lives. The youth care for and ride horses. She has received numerous accolades. When Akbar retired in 2019, the students took over the program. Some former students founded the Compton Cowboys.

== Honors ==
- 2009 National Multicultural Western Heritage Museum and Hall of Fame
- 2019 National Cowgirl Museum and Hall of Fame

== See also ==
- Black cowboys
- Fletcher Street Urban Riding Club
- New York City Federation of Black Cowboys
- Oakland Black Cowboy Association
