= Compton Cowboys =

Horseback riding group

The Compton Cowboys are a group of friends from childhood who use horseback riding and equestrian culture to provide a positive influence on inner-city youth, and to combat negative stereotypes about African Americans in the Los Angeles-suburb city of Compton.

== Early life ==
This close group of friends first met each other in the late 1990s through the Compton Jr. Posse, a non-profit organization in Richland Farms. The Jr. Posse introduced the group to the equestrian lifestyle and horseback riding. The Jr. Posse was founded in Compton by Mayisha Akbar in a semi-rural area of the city, where the organization has been home to African-American horseback riders since the 1980s.

Many of the members of the Compton Cowboys found their way into the Jr. Posse through information and encouragement from friends and family members, and through interacting with horse-riders they had seen in their neighborhoods.

Compton was a rough neighborhood, and they found horse riding to be a positive alternative to other paths common in the area. Gang violence and drugs were not an uncommon route for kids to find themselves in. The Cowboys found an interest and lifestyle that had a positive effect on them and others in the community they came across.

== Daily life and competition ==
The Compton Cowboys provide a collective effort to maintain and take care of the horses. Typical work days include cleaning the stables, getting fresh feed to the horses, riding and training, and other types of labor and care.

The group also competes in different types of events. One of their goals and hopes is to break into the rodeo circuits and create an African American presence among the predominantly white competition participants. The Cowboys continue to compete in events and also are invited to perform in parades in the Los Angeles area. Members of the group have been known to excel in events such as bull riding and English Hunter-Jumper.

== Funding and resources ==
The group relies on donations from sponsors and alumni, support from the local community, and government grants. These resources help support the cost of the horses on the ranch. Maintaining an equestrian organization can be very expensive. Typical horses used for what the Cowboys do cost from $10,000 to $50,000, but they sometimes rely on auctioned horses that cost around $200. These horses have often been victims of abuse and neglect.

Members have sufficient riding gear and equipment but can often be seen riding their horses bareback in the community. They say like many other equestrians do, that riding bareback builds a strong bond with the horse. The Cowboys have integrated this into part of their unique style.

== Mission ==
The Compton Cowboys' motto is "the streets raised us, the horses saved us." The team works to provide an alternative route and positive role models to inner-city youth. This effort helps give youth a path away from gangs and crime. As alumni of the youth program, they work closely with the Compton Junior Equestrians to provide positive influence and mentorship through horseback riding and equestrian culture.

The group also leads efforts to combat stereotypes of African Americans through their media presence. They represent past African Americans and a growing number of African Americans today who have been underrepresented in the rodeo and cowboy world, and they combat other ways African Americans have been misrepresented in the media and in popular culture. The 2020 documentary film Fire on the Hill tells the story of three South Central Los Angeles urban cowboys, including members of Compton Cowboys, and their struggle to preserve a threatened culture by rebuilding their community stable, "The Hill," after a mysterious fire burnt it down.

During the 2025 Greater Los Angeles wildfires, Compton Cowboys' co-founder Randy Savvy helped evacuate horses from areas at risk of burning.

=== Educational goals ===
The Cowboys work to create a presence that challenges African-American stereotypes. These efforts include combating stereotypes associated with gang violence and other harmful but common portrayals.

The media rarely portrays cowboys as African Americans. But after the American Civil War, there were an estimated 5,000-8,000 African American cowboys. Cowboys are a central part of American history and culture. Combating this stereotype a goal of the Compton Cowboys because doing so reflects and uncovers an unrealized and underrepresented core of American history and culture. By some estimates, in the 19th century one in four cowboys was of African-American descent.

== See also ==
- Fletcher Street Urban Riding Club
- New York City Federation of Black Cowboys
- Oakland Black Cowboy Association
- African-American trail rides
