= Black Cowboys =

Black Cowboys may refer to:

- "Black Cowboys", a song by Bruce Springsteen on his 2005 album Devils & Dust
- "Black Cowboys", a song by Jeru the Damaja on his 1996 album Wrath of the Math

== See also ==
- Black cowboys
- New York City Federation of Black Cowboys
