= Black cowboys =

Racial demographic of cowboys in the United States

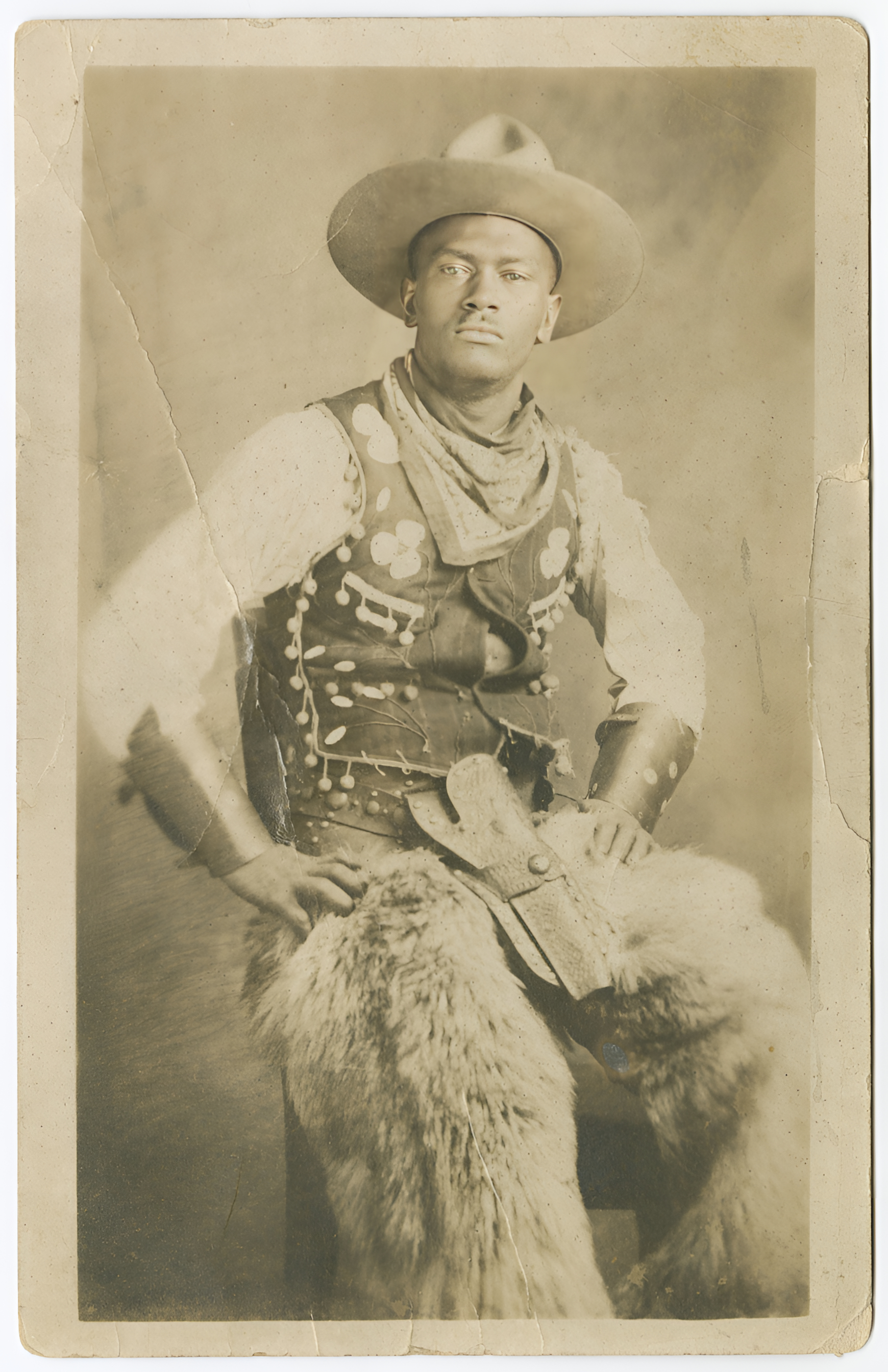
Postcard with a portrait of a Black cowboy from the early 1900s

Black cowboys in the American West accounted for up to an estimated 25% of cowboys "who went up the trail" to participate in cattle drives from the 1860s to 1880s, estimated to be at least 5,000 individuals. They were also part of the rest of the ranching industry in the West.

Typically former slaves or born into the families of former slaves, many African American men had skills in cattle handling and headed West at the end of the Civil War. Compared to other industries of the time, Black men in the cattle industry were able to hold a range of responsibilities and get paid relatively equally to White men, although racial discrimination persisted.

Black cowboys participated in the rodeo competitions that grew out of the cattle industry starting in the 1870s, but since they faced discrimination in most White-sponsored shows, many organized their own shows that traveled around rural communities up to the 1940s. The Bill Pickett Invitational Rodeo and other Black rodeo organizations continue to feature Black rodeo performers.

Many Western films and television shows have underrepresented the number of Black people who worked in the West, but some have featured or included portrayals of Black cowboys, including characters based on historical figures. In the 2010s and 2020s, musicians including Beyoncé and Lil Nas X created hit songs and award-winning albums that drew on the history of Black cowboys.

In rural communities in Texas, Louisiana, and neighboring states, African-American trail rides celebrate Black cowboy culture. Several cities also have horse riding clubs inspired by the history and traditions of Black cowboys, such as the Oakland Black Cowboy Association and New York City Federation of Black Cowboys.

== Background ==
Some men enslaved in the early United States likely had experience with animal husbandry from their homes in West Africa and contributed their skills to the early development of open range cattle ranching, blended with European and Native American practices.

As early as 1770, regulations in Louisiana required two slaves to manage 100 head of cattle. White ranchers could even win competitions based on the cow-handling skills of the Black slaves in their possession. In the first half of the 1800s, White Americans settled in Texas and brought many slaves to work on their cattle ranches. In Antebellum Texas, White ranchers referred to White workers as "cow hands," with Black people in the same position referred to with the pejorative "cow boy." Prior to the abolition of slavery, the cattle trade was considered to offer a high degree of relative freedom to slaves, who would be issued guns, often left unaccompanied on horseback for long stretches, and trusted to return.

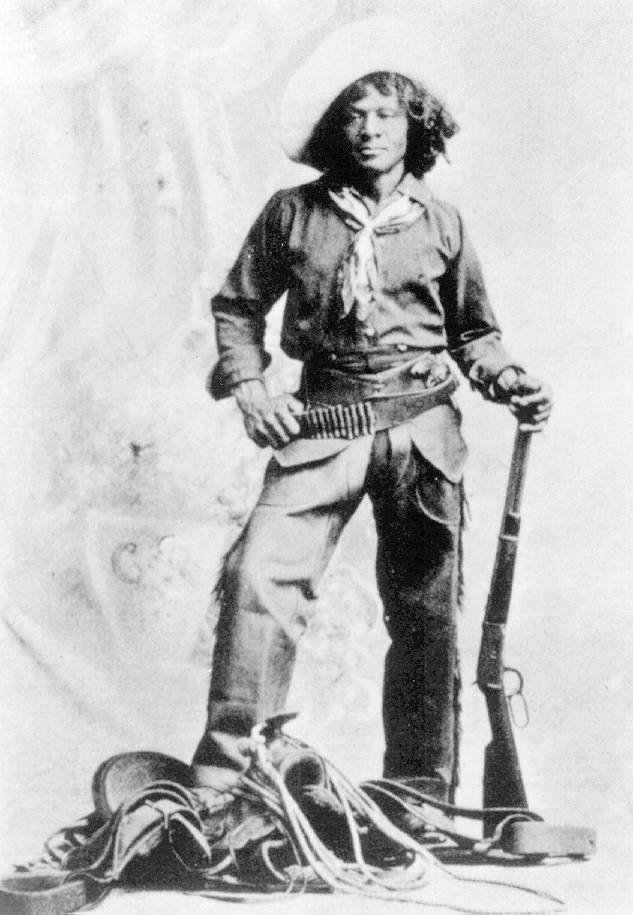
Nat Love (1854–1921), an African-American cowboy and former slave

After the Reconstruction of the South after the American Civil War, freed slaves were still denied land ownership and other rights in many states, and about 20,000 Exodusters headed west to Kansas between 1879 and 1884, with smaller migrations to other Western states. Many trained under Mexican vaqueros, cattle-raising Native Americans, or their former masters. They then worked as ranch hands for wages equal to their White counterparts, offering more opportunities than existed for freemen in the South.

Free Black cattle drivers drove cattle from Kansas to areas including Atlanta, the Dakotas, and Canada, as well as New Mexico, Arizona, California and Oregon. Some freed slaves remained with their former masters as employees. As these areas became more settled and established more practical transportation networks, the era of migrant cattle ranching came to an end.

== Work ==
Black men worked in a range of roles in the cattle trade, including trail hands, horse wranglers, and cooks. Historian Kenneth Porter describes the employment composition of trail parties as:

"...A trailherd outfit of about a dozen men would on the average consist of seven or eight Whites, including the trail boss, three Negroes—one of whom was probably the cook, while another might be the horse wrangler, and the third would simply be a trail hand—and one or two Mexicans; if a Negro was not the wrangler, then a Mexican often was. Needless to say, this is not the typical trail outfit of popular literature and drama...Negroes occupied all the positions among cattle-industry employees, from the usually lowly wrangler through ordinary hand to top hand and lofty cook. But they were almost never, except in the highly infrequent case of an all-Negro outfit, to be found as ranch or trail boss."

Black cowhands were typically assigned to handle horses with poor temperaments and wild behaviors, a career known as horsebreaking. Evidence suggests that many Black cowhands took on additional labor, such as laundry, testing stream water, taking late night guard shifts, and being the first expected to take on rough horses. Traveling trail hands leading a migration of cattle were typically low-paid at the time, though better paid in the northern states. Pay was typically negotiated per run, with large discrepancies between runs and among hires on the same run. Though Mexican ranchers often received less than a third of the pay of White hires, little evidence suggests Black hires were paid less for this work than their White counterparts. However, Black employees may have been worked harder and expected to work longer hours.

Trail cooks could earn extra money over other cowhands, regardless of race. Trail menus from Black chefs included biscuits, sowbelly, beef, molasses, and coffee. Black chefs hunted deer and wild turkey between washing and kitchen cleaning duties.

Black cowhands were expected to perform on the trail, and expected to sing or to pack a musical instrument. They contributed to the development of Western music, creating well-known songs and ballads. For example, Charley Willis was known for his singing on the Wyoming trail, and he is credited with the song "Goodbye Old Paint".

Others served as bodyguards or money transporters, which has been attributed to the unlikelihood of thieves searching a Black man for large sums of money. Bose Ikard served as Charles Goodnight's banker for many years.

Despite the existence of all-Black trail outfits, Black cowboys rarely attained a rank higher than trail cook or chuckwagon. Regardless of ability, Black men were constrained by having to negotiate with White men who might refuse to respect the authority of a Black trail leader. Denied opportunities to become a foreman or range manager, many Black cowhands trained White counterparts, with others settling land with their own cattle.

There were Black women cowhands, though their numbers are unknown, as income was provided to a common household rather than to individual women. Women were unlikely to inherit a homestead or continue to work in ranching, as freemen and White ranchers were unlikely to work for a Black woman. A few Black women cowboys are known by name, including Henrietta Williams Foster, a "legendary" cowhand. Johanna July tamed horses and raised cattle. There were also other Black women in notable roles in the American West, including Mary Fields, a star route postwoman, and Jane Manning James, who had a farm with her husband.

=== Social life ===
Social life on the trail could be egalitarian, with White and Black cowhands sharing sleeping quarters and even blankets. Though White and Black cowhands were social equals on the trail, racist roles were resumed in the presence of White women.

Traveling posed its own challenges to integration. Whereas saloons were typically segregated, Whites and Blacks could meet in the middle, but restaurants were socially regulated. Traveling Black men would not be seated in town restaurants where Black-only establishments had not been established, requiring Black men to order food from the back door. Most Black cowhands would purchase food and prepare it for themselves on the trail. Black men were banned from brothels but welcome in gambling halls.

== Rodeos ==
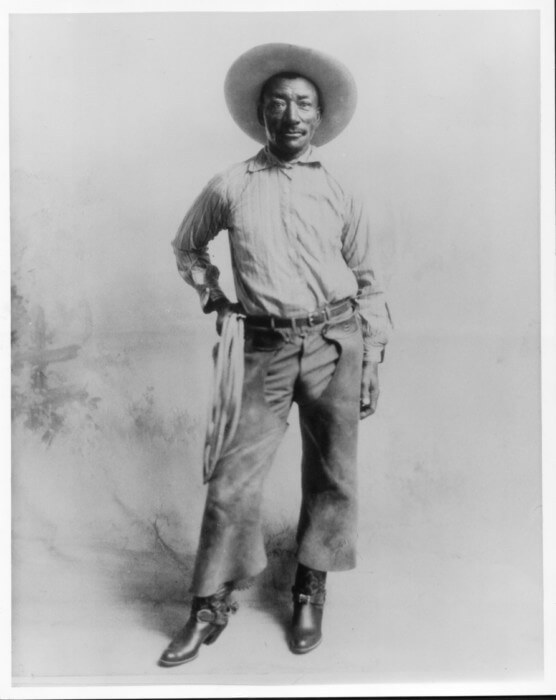
Bill Pickett (1870–1932), an African-American cowboy, rodeo performer, and actor

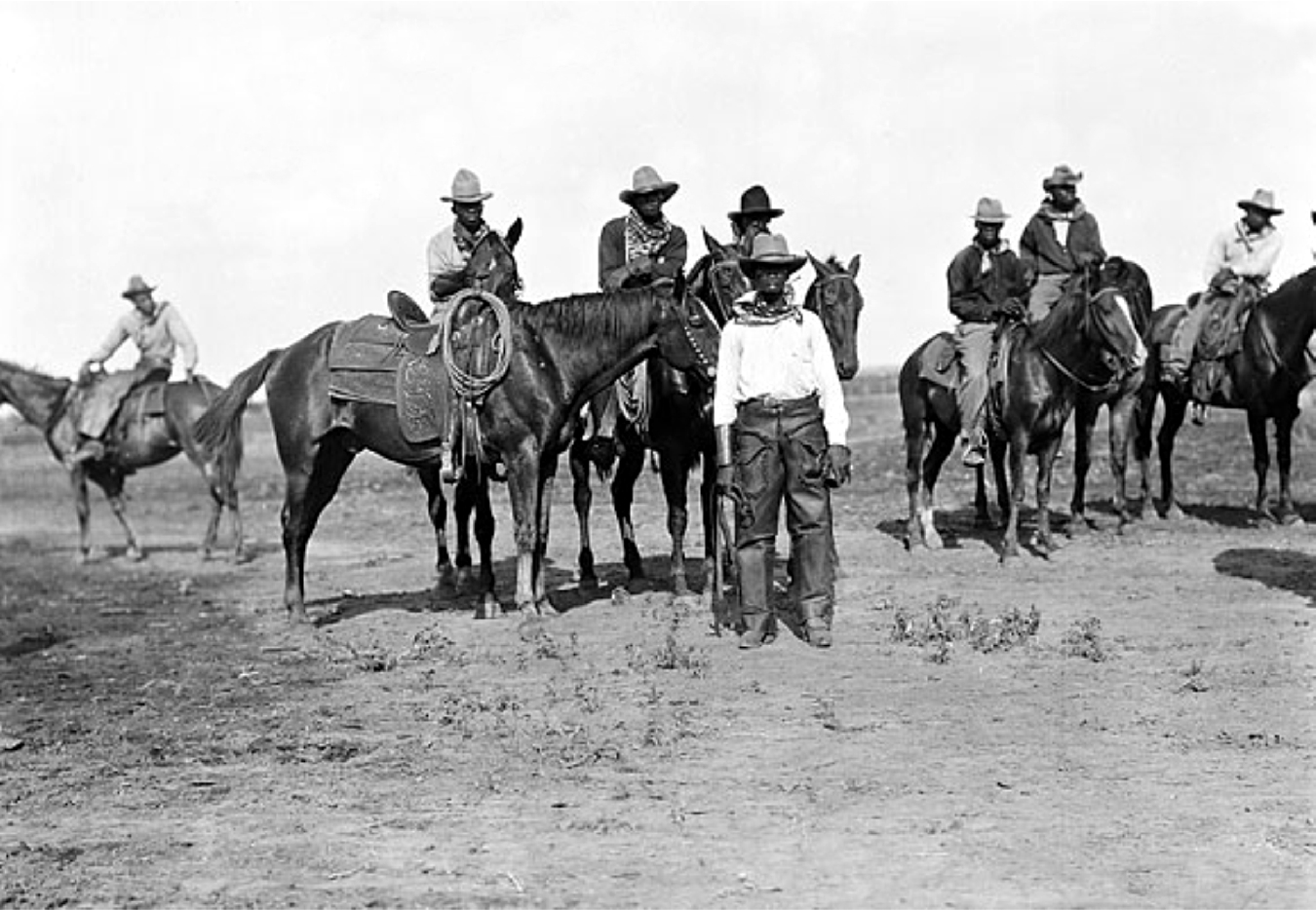
Black cowboys at the "Negro State Fair" in Bonham, Texas, in 1913

Popularized across the United States in 1873 by Buffalo Bill Cody, Wild West shows showcased skills and characters of the Western United States in the form of a traveling performance including rodeo roping, Native American dances, and other acts. Among these traveling shows, African-American cowboy Jesse Stahl was famous for his saddle riding, a defining aspect of rodeos. Bill Pickett was credited with inventing bulldogging. Racism was common in rodeo competitions, and terms such as "harder to cover" could be used to mask racism in rodeo competitions under the guise that White riders had more difficult horses.

Black rodeo riders would be compared to animals, given nicknames reflecting African animals and using animal metaphors not found in descriptions of White rodeo performers. In response to their treatment and Jim Crow laws, Black cowboys formed "soul circuits," later organized as the Southwestern Colored Cowboys' Association, with the largest number of African-American cowboys participating in rural communities along the coast of Texas up to the 1940s.

== Media portrayals ==
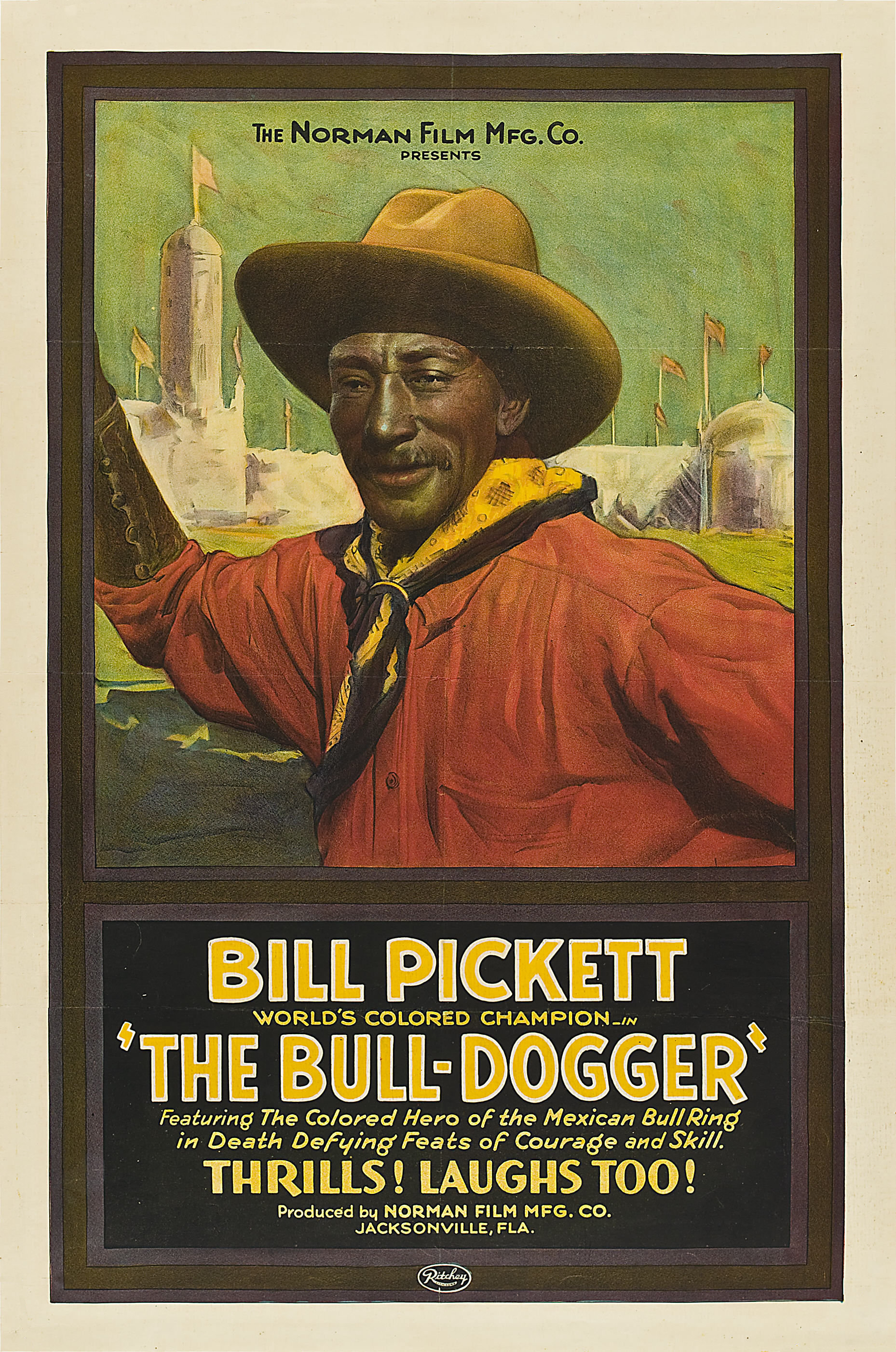
Film poster for The Bull-Dogger (1922)

=== Film and television ===
A 1922 silent western film, The Bull-Dogger, starred Bill Pickett. In the 1930s, there were a handful of Western race films with Black actors that played in segregated movie theaters for Black audiences. The first of these was Harlem on the Prairie (1937), starring African American cowboy singer Herb Jeffries, who went on to play the character Bob Blake in a series of films including Two-Gun Man from Harlem (1938), Harlem Rides the Range (1939), and The Bronze Buckaroo (1939).

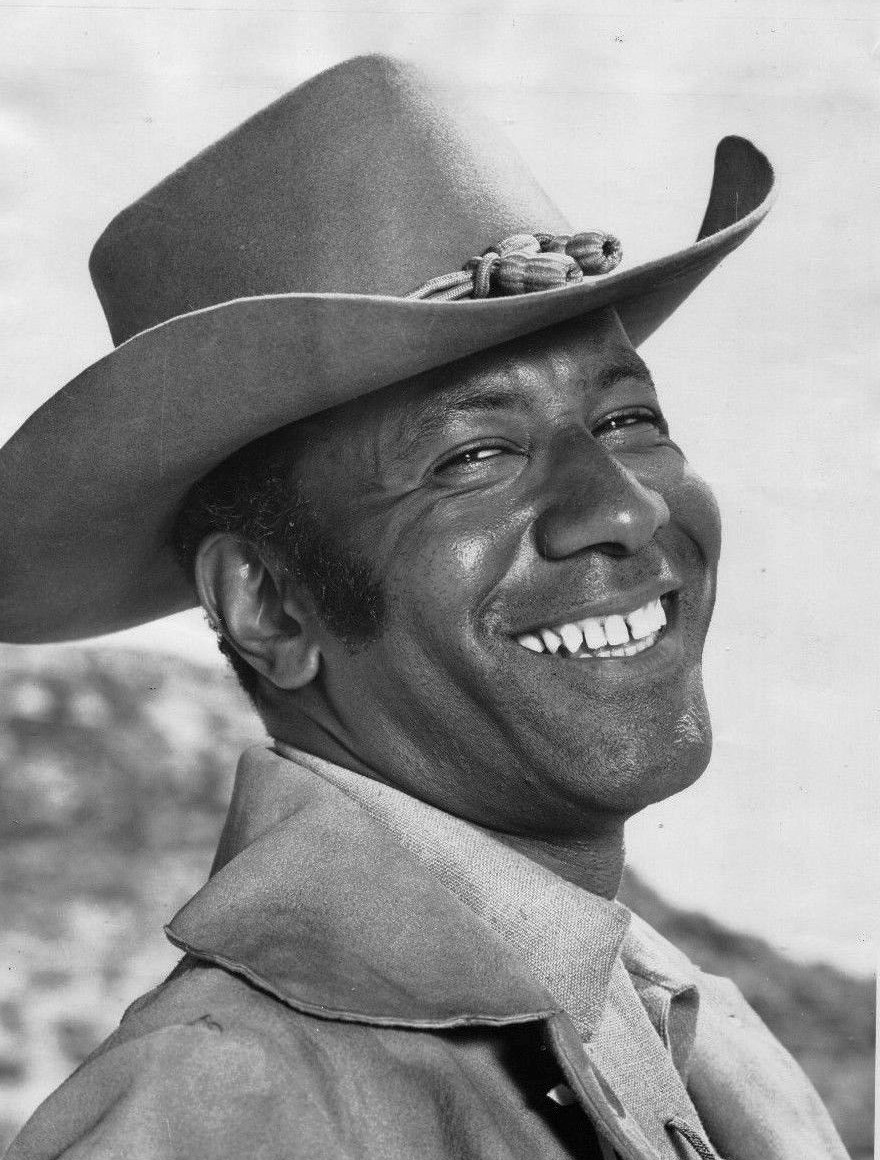
Raymond St. Jacques portraying the character Simon Blake in Rawhide, 1965

A few mainstream Western movies and television shows in the 1960s included Black characters, including The Man Who Shot Liberty Valance (1962) with Woody Strode, and two episodes of The Rifleman (1962) with Sammy Davis Jr. The television show Rawhide (1965) included Raymond St. Jacques as a cattle driver, the first Black actor to appear in a regular role on a Western series. Otis Young was the first Black actor to co-star in a Western show, The Outcasts (1968–1969).

In 1972 the documentary Black Rodeo, narrated by Woody Strode, told stories of Black cowboys. In Blazing Saddles (1974), a Western comedy film, Cleavon Little plays Bart, a Black sheriff.

A character based on Bose Ikard was played by Danny Glover in Lonesome Dove (1989). Glover also played a Black cowboy in Silverado (1985). The 1993 Western film Posse includes Black cowboys, and Black Fox (1995) features a character based on a historical Black cowboy, Britt Johnson. The television movie The Cherokee Kid (1996) includes a character based on Nat Love.

The short film They Die by Dawn (2013), directed by Jeymes Samuel, has characters based on Nat Love and Mary Fields. The Western film Hell on the Border (2019) features a character based on Bass Reeves, the first Black deputy U.S. Marshal west of the Mississippi River.

The Harder They Fall (2021), also directed by Jeymes Samuel, is a Western with characters based on historical Black people in the West, including Nat Love, Bill Pickett, and Mary Fields. The Jordan Peele directed science fiction horror film Nope is about two Black horse-wranglers dealing with an unidentified flying object in Agua Dulce, California.

High Horse: The Black Cowboy, a 2025 documentary series executive produced by Jordan Peele and his production company, Monkeypaw Productions, highlights the often forgotten history of African American cowboys.

=== Music ===
Beyoncé's song "Daddy Lessons", on her album Lemonade (2016), helped create the "Yeehaw Agenda", a trend of reclaiming Black cowboy culture through music and fashion. In 2018, musician Dom Flemons released an album of Western songs, Black Cowboys, that was nominated for a Grammy Award for Best Folk Album. "Old Town Road" (2018), a hit single by Lil Nas X, references Black cowboy culture. Black cowboys are prominently featured in Solange Knowles' musical short film When I Get Home (2019), where she sought to highlight their historical influence on Black Texan culture. On her album Cowboy Carter (2024), Beyoncé also draws from Black cowboy history and culture.

=== Books ===
The 1998 children's picture book Black Cowboy, Wild Horses tells a story about Bob Lemmons, as does a portion of the Woodson Award winning graphic novel Black Heroes of the Wild West.

=== Comics ===
On August 19, 1950, the Pittsburgh Courier, an African-American newspaper, launched a new color comic section. The Smith-Mann Syndicate supplied several strips featuring Black characters, among them The Chisholm Kid, a Western by Carl Pfeufer that ran in the paper until August 11, 1956.

Years later, another African-American Western hero emerged: Lobo. Created by D. J. Arneson and Tony Tallarico. He starred in Dell Comics's little-known two-issue eponymous comic book series (Dec. 1965 and Sept. 1966), and is regarded as the medium's first Black character to headline his own series.

Marvel Comics already had a history of publishing Western titles when, in July 1972, the company introduced Gunhawks, created by Gary Friedrich and Syd Shores. The series featured two gunslingers, Kid Cassidy and Reno Jones, whose backgrounds were deeply connected. Cassidy was the son of a slaveholding family in the antebellum South, while Jones was an enslaved man on that same plantation, yet the two were friends. During the Civil War, they fought together for the Confederacy, with Jones joining after Union soldiers kidnapped his lover, Rachel Brown. After the war, they roamed the frontier as the Gunhawks, still searching for Rachel. In issue number six, published in 1973, Cassidy was killed in a chaotic confrontation, and Jones was wrongly blamed for his death. With the following issue, the series was retitled Reno Jones, Gunhawk, making Jones Marvel's first Black cowboy to lead a Western comic.

In 2018, the Italian publisher Sergio Bonelli Editore, world-renowned for series such as Tex Willer, adapted into comics the stories by Texan writer Joe R. Lansdale inspired by Nat Love. The original works included the short stories Hide and Horns (2009) and Soldierin' (2010), the novella Black Hat Jack (2014), and the novel Paradise Sky (2015), the latter winner of the Spur Award for Best Historical Novel in 2016.

The adaptation transformed these narratives into a seven-issue miniseries, which was part of the Audace" imprint, aimed at an adult audience. The project featured a talented team: scripts were written by Michele Masiero, Maurizio Colombo, and Mauro Boselli, while the artwork was handled by renowned house artists Corrado Mastantuono, Pasquale Frisenda, and Stefano Andreucci.

In 2012, Best Shot in the West: The Adventures of Nat Love was published as a graphic novel written by Patricia and Fredrick McKissack and illustrated by Randy DuBurke.

In 2020, the Denver Art Museum commissioned R. Alan Brooks to create the comic book Nat Love: A Cowboy's Life, Brooks handled the pencils and inks himself, while Lonnie MF Allen contributed the colors.

=== Museums ===
The Black American West Museum and Heritage Center, in Denver, Colorado, was founded in 1971 to tell the stories of Black cowboys with artifacts and exhibits. The National Multicultural Western Heritage Museum in Fort Worth, Texas, formerly known as the National Cowboys of Color Museum and Hall of Fame, was founded in 2001. The Black Cowboy Museum in Rosenberg, Texas, opened in 2017.

=== Rodeo ===
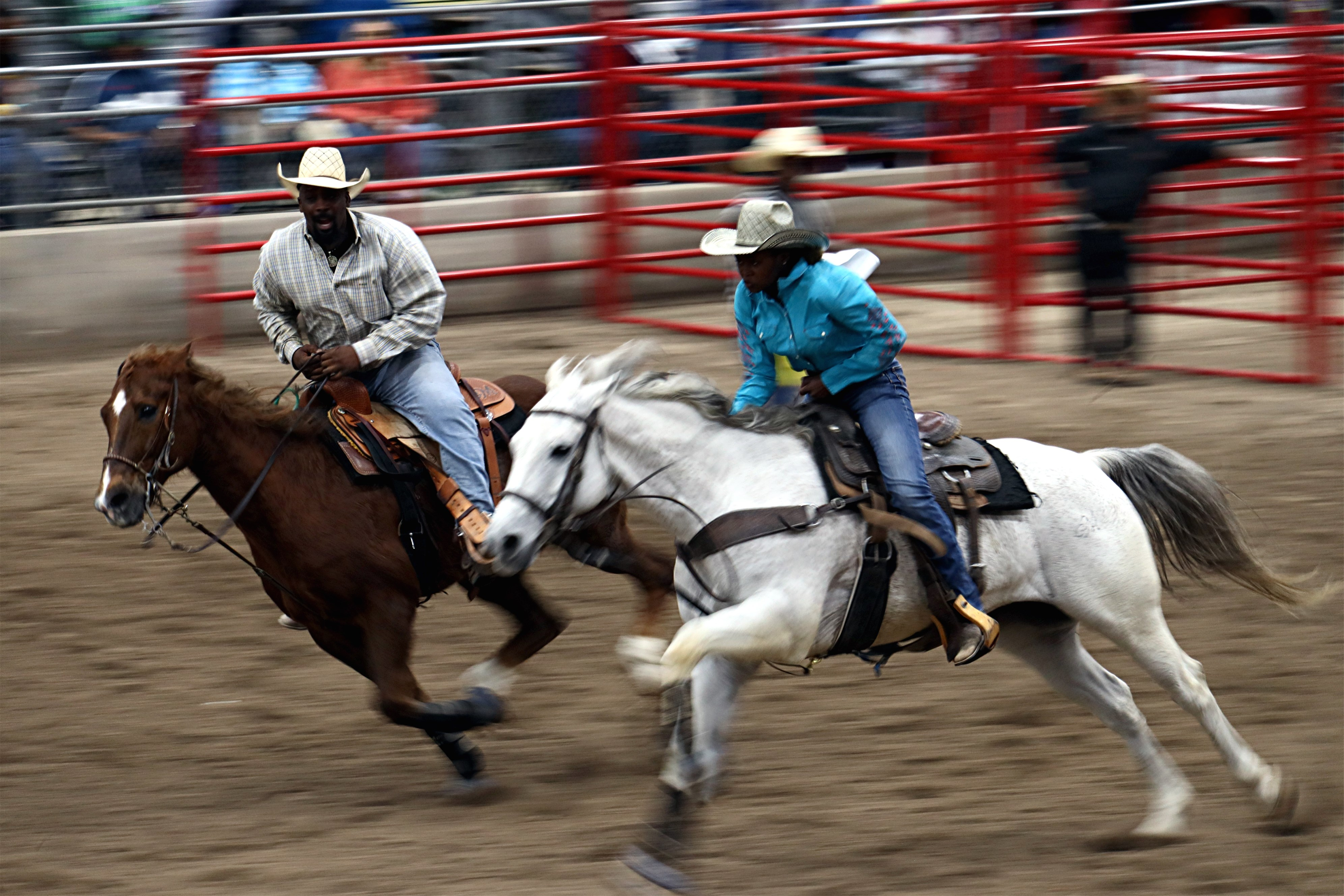
Black Heritage Day & Rodeo in Humble, Texas in 2022

Many cities have annual rodeos centered on Black rodeo performers, and there are touring rodeos as well. The Roy LeBlanc Okmulgee Invitational Rodeo, based in Okmulgee, Oklahoma, was established in 1956 and continues to hold annual rodeos. Inspired by the Denver museum, Lu Vason founded the Bill Pickett Invitational Rodeo in 1984. It has continued as a traveling rodeo that celebrates Black cowboys. Its events include the annual MLK Jr. African American Heritage Rodeo of Champions in Denver, Colorado. The Cowboys of Color Rodeo, founded by Cleo Hearn, is a touring rodeo that recruits participants from diverse racial backgrounds.

Notable 20th century African-American rodeo performers include Hearn, Myrtis Dightman, Charlie Sampson, Billy Ray Thunder, and Fred Whitfield. Black women in the present-day rodeo industry include Nicole Scott, founder of the Midwest Invitational Rodeo, along with rodeo athletes Staci Russell, Savannah Roberts, and Aleeyah Roberts.

=== Riding clubs, trail rides, and education ===
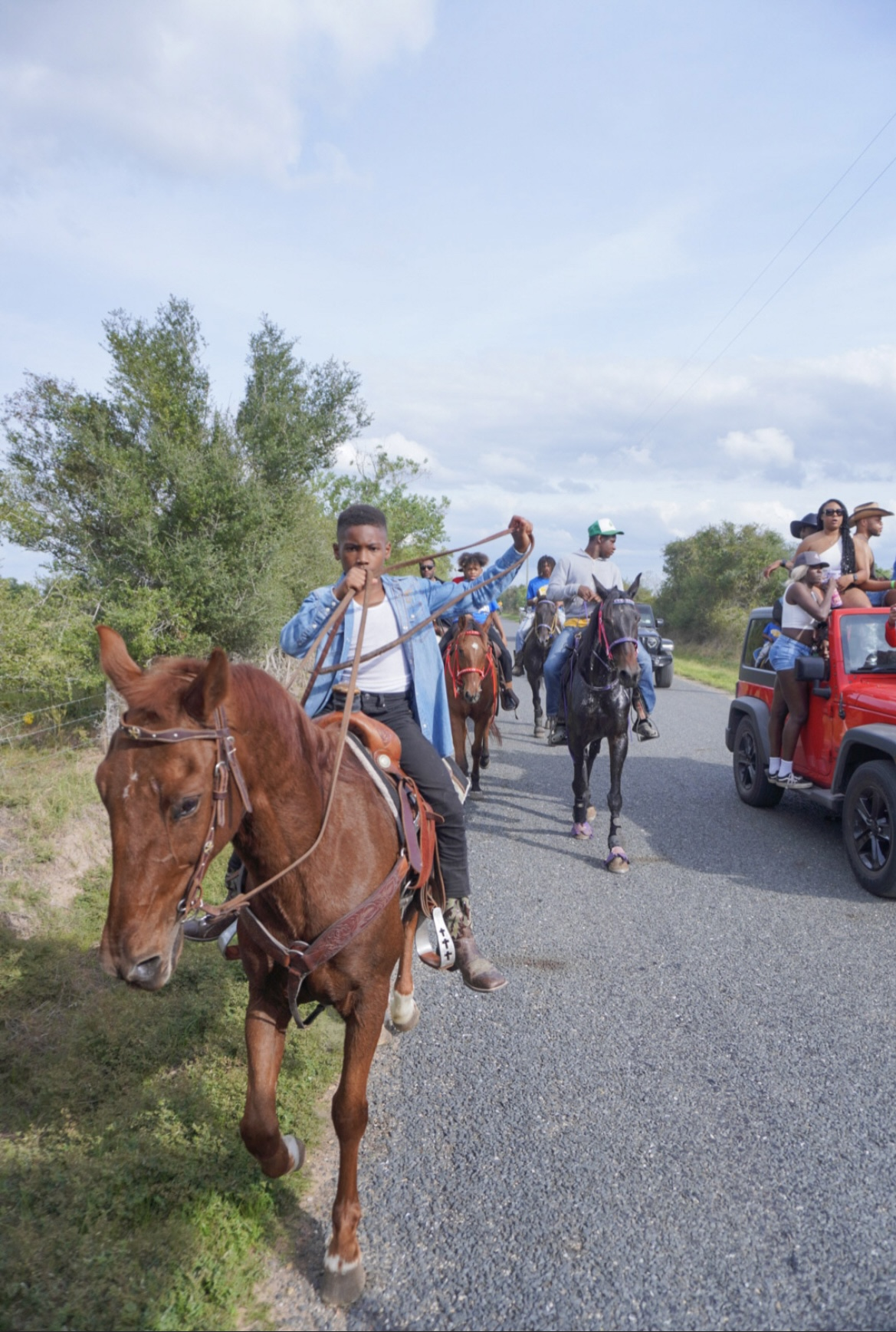
African Americans on a traditional trail ride in rural Texas

Present-day riding clubs in major cities include the Oakland Black Cowboy Association (since the 1970s), Compton Cowboys in the Los Angeles area (started in the 1990s), New York City Federation of Black Cowboys (since the 1990s), and Fletcher Street Urban Riding Club in Philadelphia (organized in the 2000s). Other riding clubs include Circle L 5 in Fort Worth, Texas, founded in the early 1950s, and Cowgirls of Color.

In Louisiana, Texas, and neighboring states, African-American trail rides celebrate and preserve the history of Black cowboys. Every year since 1957, the Prairie View Trail Ride Association at Prairie View A&M University have done a trail ride from Hempstead, Texas, to Houston to attend the Houston Livestock Show and Rodeo.

Companies and organizations also teach about Black cowboy heritage as part of working ranches and equestrian training centers. The Taylor-Stevenson Ranch in Houston, Texas, is an African-American owned ranch that includes an American Cowboy Museum established by Mollie Taylor Stevenson Jr. in 1988. In the San Francisco Bay Area, Brianna Noble founded Urban Cowgirl Ranch, a training center with workshops for youth of color. In North Carolina, Caitlin Gooch maintains a horse stable and works to teach Black children about Black horse culture while inspiring them to improve their reading skills.

During the George Floyd protests in May 2020, Noble drew positive attention for riding her horse in the protest, providing an inspirational image. Trail riding clubs, including the Compton Cowboys, took part in peaceful protests as well.

=== Media about contemporary cowboys ===
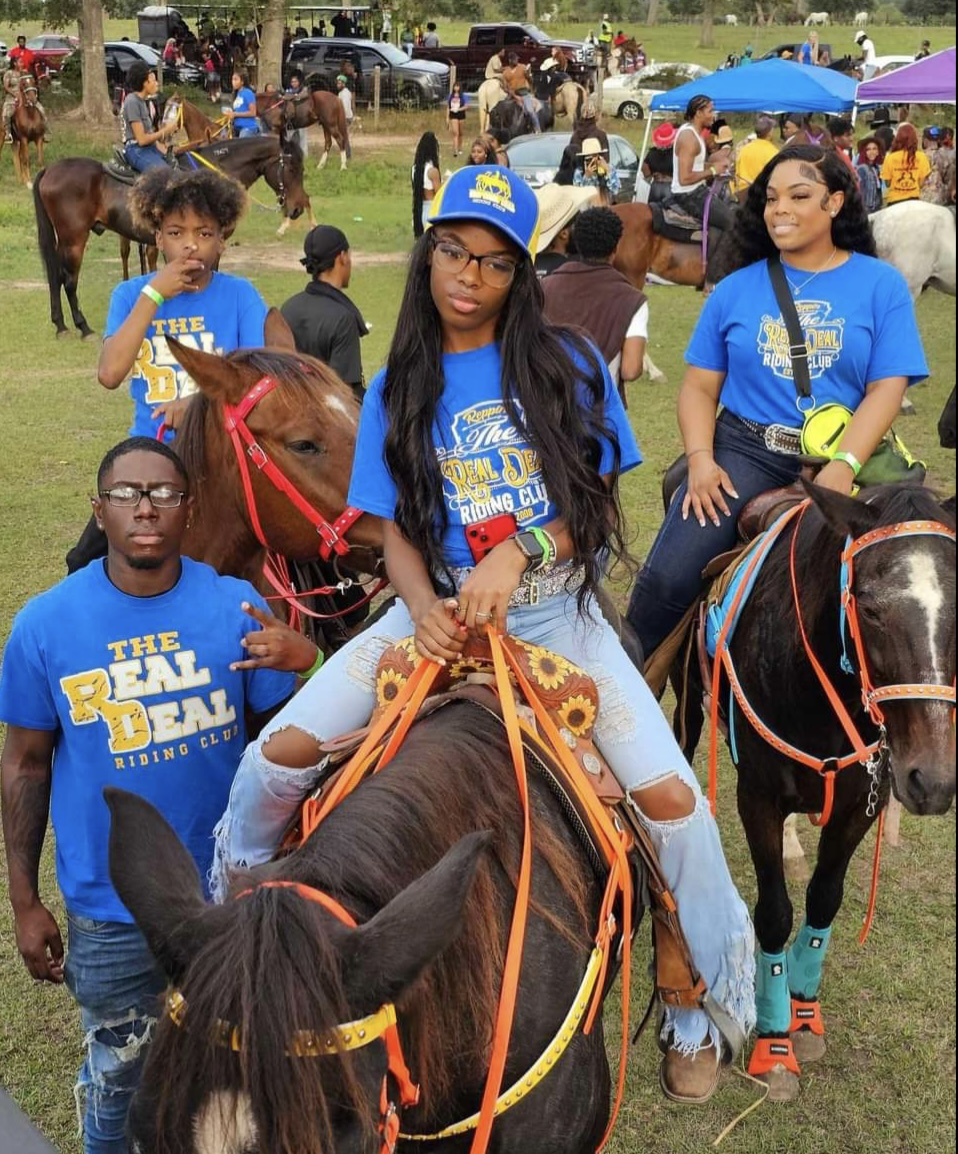
Cowgirls and cowboys in a riding club in Texas

The novel Ghetto Cowboy (2011), by Greg Neri, and film Concrete Cowboy (2020) were inspired by the Fletcher Street Urban Riding Club in Philadelphia. The documentary Fire on the Hill (2020) and nonfiction book The Compton Cowboys: The New Generation of Cowboys in America's Urban Heartland (2020) are about Black horseback riders in Los Angeles.

Contemporary Black cowboys have been photographed by a number of artists:

- Photojournalist Ron Tarver documented contemporary Black cowboys in The Long Ride Home: The Black Cowboy Experience in America, which was exhibited at the Chisholm Trail Heritage Center (2013) and the Studio Museum in Harlem (2016–2017), and has been published in a book (2024).
- Photojournalist Rory Doyle photographed many Mississippi Delta-area riders in his "Delta Hill Riders" project (2018).
- Photographer Gabriela Hasbun published a book of photos of the Bill Pickett Invitational Rodeo, The New Black West: Photographs From America's Only Touring Black Rodeo (2022).
- Photojournalist Ivan McClellan published Eight Seconds: Black Rodeo Culture (2024), a book of photos of the Roy LeBlanc Okmulgee Invitational Rodeo in Oklahoma.

== See also ==
- Ashworth family
- Black homesteaders
- George Fletcher
- William Grandstaff
- George McJunkin
- Isam Dart
- John Ware
- Patricia E. Kelly
- Verna Lee Hightower
