= Fletcher Street Urban Riding Club =

Philadelphia non-profit dedicated to inner-city horsemanship

The Fletcher Street Riding Club is a 501(c)(3) non-profit organization devoted to inner-city horsemanship in North Philadelphia. Part of a century-long tradition of black cowboys and horsemanship in Philadelphia, local horsemen maintain and care for horses and teach neighborhood youth to do so. They encourage academic excellence and provide positive ways for local youth to spend their leisure time outdoors. The nonprofit organization has struggled to find funding and secure and maintain their place of operations.

== Activities ==
The Fletcher Street club has stables in the Strawberry Mansion neighborhood of North Philadelphia, on the edge of Fairmount Park. In November 2023, they opened a new stable in East Fairmount Park. Informal stables also existed throughout North and West Philadelphia and in Cobbs Creek Park, on private and abandoned city land. The horses are ridden throughout the city's streets and parks, and regular races are held on an open strip of Fairmount Park called the Speedway. Experienced horsemen and youth in the area care for the horses, and the Fletcher Street club horses receive additional care from a prominent area veterinarian.

The horses used in the program were initially purchased at a livestock auction in New Holland, Pennsylvania, giving a second chance to animals that would likely otherwise have been killed.

The experienced horsemen often ride these horses past the recreational field on 15th street known as 'The Oval'. It is here that the horses catch the attention of many Temple University Diamond Band members.

== History ==
The club has been around for over 100 years, but the current organization was founded in 2004 by Ellis Ferrell. In 2008, the city government razed some of the stables and the club house, ostensibly to redevelop the land. At the time, the Society for the Prevention of Cruelty to Animals publicly investigated allegations by city officials that the horses were being mistreated. The allegations proved baseless. However, with the land razed and redevelopment progressing, many horses had to be moved. In the subsequent decade, a few dozen horses remained.

In 2009, the club planned to bring more formal mentoring and tutoring elements into its programs, although tight budgets made this difficult. On Halloween of that year, the program held a benefit event at the First District Plaza in Philadelphia, a collaboration between local fishermen (who also run a youth program), local churches, the urban cowboys themselves, and the local business association, Strawberry Mansion SMART Business Association.

For decades, the club has been led by Ellis Ferrell and supported by other local horsemen and community members. In previous years, the Fletcher Street Urban Riding Club was a registered nonprofit in Pennsylvania and Friends of Fletcher Street, a supporting organization, was under the fiscal sponsorship of MAP Holistic Community Development, a nonprofit 501(c)(3) organization.

Since 2015, the club has been a recognized federal nonprofit organization with 501(c)(3) tax-exempt status, enabling it to accept tax-deductible donations, including its first title deed to a 7,500-square-foot piece of vacant land, and revive its fundraising efforts. The lot was donated to the organization by Good Bet Trading, a local real estate company owned by Philadelphia native Adam Ehrlich.

In 2019, the club moved onto newly acquired land. However, the long-dormant triangle of city land used for decades by the club was threatened by the Philadelphia Housing Authority, which acquired the land for $1 and broke ground on a housing project.

In April 2021, following the release of the Netflix movie based on them, Ellis Ferrell and the Fletcher Street Riding Club launched a fundraiser, so that support could flow into the real-life programs that Ferrell, his family, and the group's friends have largely self-funded for decades, despite external pressure, direct city government interference, and acquisition of their longtime property for housing construction.

== In popular culture ==
The Fletcher Street Urban Riding Club has been mentioned in NPR's This American Life (television version) and in regional equestrian magazines. It has also attracted photographers and filmmakers, local and global, amateur and professional. In 2006 Martha Camarillo published a book of photographs, "Fletcher Street."

G. Neri's 2011 young adult novel Ghetto Cowboy is based in Fletcher Street and urban horsemanship culture. The novel was adapted into a film called Concrete Cowboy starring Idris Elba that debuted on Netflix on April 2, 2021.

The music video for the song "Feel the Love" by Rudimental featured Fletcher Street horses and riders.

In the second issue of the "Wasteland" storyline of the Bureau for Paranormal Research and Defense (part of the Hellboy comic universe), the character Nichols Nichols, who grew up in Philadelphia, is surprisingly knowledgeable about horses. When asked how, he identifies the Fletcher Street Urban Riding Club, remarking, "City didn't care what happened to little brothers, but Fletcher Street, they looked out for us."

In early 2018, Google featured the club in a video advertising its Pixel 2 smartphone.

== Other urban horsemanship programs ==
In Philadelphia, one organized group is the Black Cowboys Association, which Philadelphia Weekly called "a Philadelphia institution that offers kids in the city's toughest neighborhoods the chance to claim a path out of the 'hood on horseback." Another formal horsemanship program in Philadelphia for local teenagers is Work to Ride, based at Chamounix Equestrian Stables in Fairmount Park.

Black urban horsemanship programs exist in major cities throughout the United States. These include Horses in the Hood in Los Angeles and the Federation of Black Cowboys in Queens in New York City, the subject of a 2003 film produced by Zachary Mortensen.

In Dublin, Ireland, teenagers in a difficult low-income neighborhood have had a tradition of keeping horses and riding them since at least the 1990s. Some of the young people are from Irish Traveller families. In 1999, British newspaper The Independent described "Dublin's suburban horse culture" as "a fascinating example of what happens when the poor appropriate the pleasures of the rich." An anthropological study of the Dublin program examined the community development program in the context of anti-poverty efforts. In 2007, a television series documented the story of five "pony kids" selected to ride and tour the fancier equine world.

== See also ==
- African-American trail rides
- Compton Cowboys
- Oakland Black Cowboy Association
