= Billy the Kid (ballet) =

Ballet written by the American composer Aaron Copland

- Choreographer: Eugene Loring
- Music: Aaron Copland
- Based on: the story of Billy the Kid
- Premiere: 16 October 1938; Civic Opera House
- Original ballet company: Ballet Caravan Company
- Setting: Wild West

Billy the Kid is a 1938 ballet written by the American composer Aaron Copland on commission from Lincoln Kirstein. It was choreographed by Eugene Loring for Ballet Caravan. Along with Rodeo and Appalachian Spring, it is one of Copland's most popular and widely performed pieces. It is most famous for its incorporation of several cowboy tunes and American folk songs and, although built around the figure and the exploits of Billy the Kid, is not so much a biography of a notorious but peculiarly appealing desperado as it is a perception of the "Wild West", in which a figure such as Billy played a vivid role.

It premiered on 16 October 1938 in Chicago by the Ballet Caravan Company, with pianists Arthur Gold and Walter Hendl performing a two-piano version of the score. The first performance in New York City occurred on 24 May 1939, with an orchestra conducted by Fritz Kitzinger.

== Story ==
Setting: New Mexico and Arizona, 1870s and 1880s

The story follows the life of the infamous outlaw Billy the Kid. It begins with "The Open Prairie" and shows many pioneers trekking westward. The action shifts to a small frontier town, in which a young Billy and his mother are present. His mother is killed by a stray bullet during a gunfight and he stabs her killer, then goes on the run.

The next scene shows episodes in Billy's later life. He is living in the desert, is hunted and captured by a posse (in which the ensuing gun battle features prominent percussive effects) and taken to jail. He manages to escape after stealing a gun from the warden during a game of cards and returns to his hideout, where he thinks he is safe, but sheriff Pat Garrett catches up and shoots him to death. The ballet ends with "The Open Prairie" theme and pioneers once again travelling west.

== Order of numbers ==
1. Introduction: The Open Prairie
2. Street Scene in a Frontier Town
3. Mexican Dance and Finale
4. Prairie Night (Card Game at Night, Billy and his Sweetheart)
5. Gun Battle
6. Celebration (After Billy's Capture)
7. Waltz
8. Billy's Death
9. The Open Prairie Again

== Instrumentation ==
Woodwinds	Brass	Percussion	Strings
piccolo	4 horns in F	piano	harp
2 flutes	3 trumpets in B♭	timpani	1st and 2nd violins
2 oboes	3 trombones	bass drum	violas
2 clarinets in B♭	tuba	cymbals	cellos
2 bassoons		triangle	contrabasses
		snare drum
		woodblock
		sleigh bells
		gourd (or guiro)
		glockenspiel
		xylophone
		slapstick

== Music ==
Cowboy and folk tunes were heavily used, for instance:

- "Great Grandad"
- "Git Along, Little Dogies"
- "The Old Chisholm Trail"
- "Goodbye Old Paint"

It also includes the Mexican Jarabe dance, played in 5/8 by a solo trumpet, just before "Goodbye Old Paint".

== Cover ==
The eight movements of the ballet make up the first seven tracks of jazz guitarist Bill Frisell's album "Have a Little Faith".

== See also ==
- List of historical ballet characters
