= Caleb McLaughlin =

American actor (born 2001)

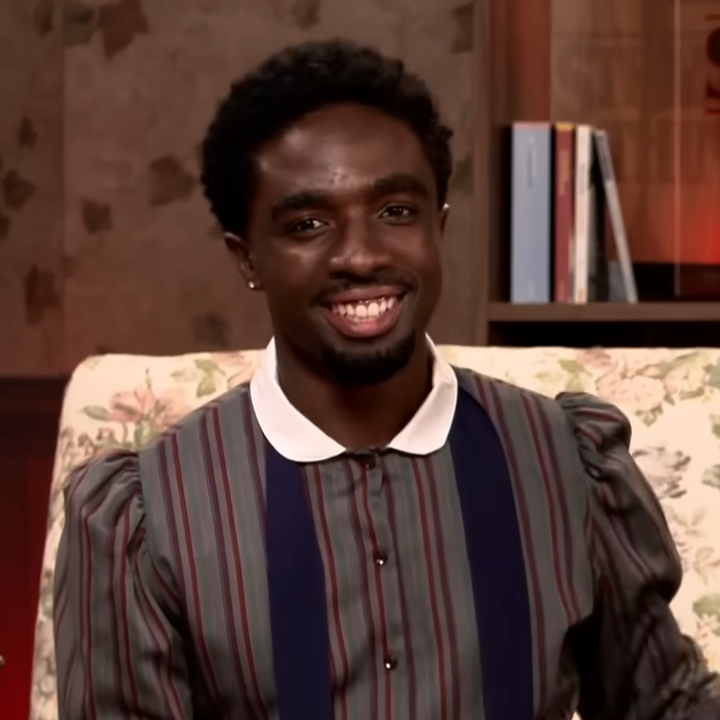
- McLaughlin in 2025
- Born: Caleb Reginald McLaughlin; October 13, 2001 (age 25); New York City, U.S.
- Occupation: Actor
- Years active: 2012–present

Caleb Reginald McLaughlin (born October 13, 2001) is an American actor. He gained international recognition playing Lucas Sinclair in the Netflix series Stranger Things (2016–2025). He began his career playing young Simba in the Broadway musical The Lion King, and then had small roles in television. After finding success in Stranger Things, he appeared in the drama films High Flying Bird (2019) and Concrete Cowboy (2020), the latter his first lead role in a feature film. He also was in the miniseries The New Edition Story (2017) and has had several television voice acting roles.

== Early life and education ==
Caleb Reginald McLaughlin was born on October 13, 2001. He grew up in Carmel, New York. He has a younger sister named Caitlyn, who is also an actress. McLaughlin attended Kent Primary School and later went to George Fischer Middle School for one year. He studied dance for a year at Happy Feet Dance School and then was a student at Seven Star School of Performing Arts in Brewster, New York, for one year. He later studied at Harlem School of the Arts in Harlem, New York under Aubrey Lynch, a former Lion King producer. He is African-American.

== Career ==
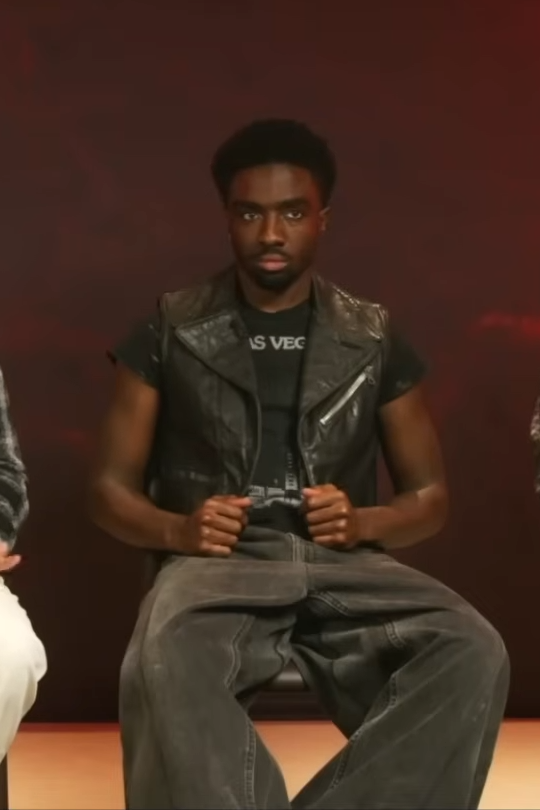
McLaughlin promoting Stranger Things season 5 in 2025

McLaughlin's first acting role was as a child in an opera, Lost in the Stars, in Cooperstown, New York, at the Glimmerglass Opera House. His first starring role was on Broadway as young Simba in The Lion King musical (2012–14). He had guest-starring roles in television series including Law & Order: Special Victims Unit, Unforgettable, Forever, What Would You Do?, and Shades of Blue. In 2016, McLaughlin's breakthrough role came with his portrayal of Lucas Sinclair in the hit Netflix series Stranger Things (2016–2025). In 2017, he was a nominee for the BET YoungStars Award, and in 2018 he won Outstanding Performance by a Youth at the NAACP Image Awards. In 2020, McLaughlin made his feature film debut in Concrete Cowboy, co-starring with Idris Elba and Jharrel Jerome. The movie received positive reviews.

In December 2020, McLaughlin was named to the Forbes 30 Under 30 Class of 2021 list. On January 8, 2024, it was announced that McLaughlin was set to feature in a biopic about British-American rap artist 21 Savage, alongside Donald Glover and Savage himself; McLaughlin was expected to play a younger version of 21 Savage. On January 24, Savage revealed that the biopic's announcement was actually a "parody", although he said that "it could be [a real movie] one day".

== Personal life ==
McLaughlin has talked about the racism he experienced being the only black actor in the main cast of Stranger Things, saying, "My very first Comic-Con some people didn't stand in my line because I was black... Sometimes overseas you feel the racism, you feel the bigotry. Sometimes it's hard to talk about and for people to understand, but when I was younger it definitely affected me a lot."

== Advocacy ==
McLaughlin has spearheaded the social media campaigns #EmbraceYourFace and #BeYourBiggestFan which promote healthy body image, positivity, and self-esteem. He said, "Feeling good about yourself is healthy. It always starts with you first, before it goes to anyone else... You have to learn to love and appreciate yourself." In 2020, he encouraged people to vote in the 2020 US presidential election, posting a video on his Instagram account with links to Vote.org.

== Acting credits ==
=== Film ===
Year	Title	Role	Notes	Ref.
2012	Noah Dreams of Origami Fortunes	Noah	Short film	
2019	High Flying Bird	Darius		
2020	Concrete Cowboy	Coltrane "Cole"		
2023	Shooting Stars	Dru Joyce III		
2023	The Book of Clarence	Dirty Zeke		
2024	The Deliverance	Nathaniel "Nate" Jackson		
2026	Goat	Will Harris	Voice	
TBA	2034 †	TBA	Post-production	

=== Television and other projects ===
Year	Title	Role	Notes
2013	Law & Order: Special Victims Unit	Kid	Episode: "Born Psychopath"
2013	Unforgettable	Older Brother	Episode: "New Hundred"
2014	Forever	Alejandro	Episode: "The Pugilist Break"
2015	What Would You Do?	Foster Child	Season 10; Episode 2
2015	Last Week Tonight with John Oliver	Himself	Season 2; Episode 23: "Washington D.C. voting rights and statehood movement"
2016	Shades of Blue	Jay-Jay	3 episodes
2016	Blue Bloods	Tony Lane	Episode: "For the Community"
2016–2025	Stranger Things	Lucas Sinclair	Main role
2017	The New Edition Story	Ricky Bell (age 13)	3 episodes
2017	Lip Sync Battle	Himself	Episode: "The Cast of Stranger Things"
2018	Final Space	Young Gary (voice)	Episode: "Chapter 4"
2018–2021	Summer Camp Island	Ghost (voice)	4 episodes
2021	Ultra City Smiths	Trevor Johnson (voice)	6 episodes
2022	The Boys Presents: Diabolical	Mo-Slo (voice)	Episode: "An Animated Short Where Pissed-Off Supes Kill Their Parents"
2026	Saturday Night Live	Himself (cameo), Lucas Sinclair	Episode: "Finn Wolfhard/ASAP Rocky"

=== Podcast ===
Año	Título	Rol	Notas
2025	Sacrilege: Curse of the Mbirwi	Dashon Wallace	Lead actor and executive producer; podcast original de Audible

=== Theater ===
Year	Title	Role	Venue	Notes	Ref.
2012, 2016	Lost in the Stars	Alex	Glimmerglass Festival, Washington National Opera		
2012–14	The Lion King	Young Simba	Minskoff Theatre	Broadway replacement	
2015	The Painted Rocks at Revolver Creek	Bokkie	Pershing Square Signature Center	Off-Broadway	

=== Music videos ===
Year	Title	Artist	Ref.
2012	"Still Standing" (feat. Jill Scott)	Pharoche Monch	
2017	"Santa's Coming for Us"	Sia	
2021	"Neighborhood"	Caleb McLaughlin	
2022	"Soul Travel"	Caleb McLaughlin	

== Awards and nominations ==
Year	Award	Category	Nominated work	Result	Ref.
2017	Young Artist Awards	Best Performance in a Digital TV Series or Film – Teen Actor	Stranger Things	Nominated	
2017	Screen Actors Guild Awards	Outstanding Performance by an Ensemble in a Drama Series	Stranger Things	Won	
2017	BET Awards	YoungStars Award	Stranger Things	Nominated	
2018	NAACP Image Awards	Outstanding Performance by a Youth (Series, Special, Television Movie or Limited Series)	Stranger Things	Won	
2018	Screen Actors Guild Awards	Outstanding Performance by an Ensemble in a Drama Series	Stranger Things	Nominated	
2018	MTV Movie & TV Awards	Best On-Screen Team (with Gaten Matarazzo, Finn Wolfhard, Noah Schnapp and Sadie Sink)	Stranger Things	Nominated	
2019	Nickelodeon Kids' Choice Awards	Favorite Male TV Star	Stranger Things	Nominated	
2019	Teen Choice Awards	Choice Summer TV Actor	Stranger Things	Nominated	
2020	Screen Actors Guild Awards	Outstanding Performance by an Ensemble in a Drama Series	Stranger Things	Nominated	
2021	Black Reel Awards	Outstanding Male Breakthrough Performance	Concrete Cowboy	Nominated	
2023	NAACP Image Awards	NAACP Image Award for Outstanding Supporting Actor in a Drama Series	Stranger Things	Nominated	
2026	NAACP Image Awards	NAACP Image Award for Outstanding Supporting Actor in a Drama Series	Stranger Things	Won	
2026	Signal Awards	Best Voice Acting	Sacrilege: Curse of the Mbirwi	Won	
