= Fire on the Hill =

2020 documentary film

- Directed by: Brett Fallentine
- Produced by: Brett Fallentine; Jenna Cedicci; Philip AlberstatJordana Glick-Franzheim; Steven Amato; Jimmy Greenway; Sean-Michael Smith
- Starring: Ghuan Featherstone; Calvin Gray; Chris Byrd
- Cinematography: Bradley Stonesifer
- Release date: 2020
- Running time: 84 minutes
- Country: United States
- Language: English

Fire on the Hill is a 2020 documentary film directed by Brett Fallentine. It tells the story of three South Central Los Angeles urban cowboys and their struggle to preserve a threatened culture by rebuilding their community stable, "The Hill," after a mysterious fire burnt it down. The film premiered at the LA Film Festival where it won the "LA Muse Award," and went on to receive other awards, including the "Artistic Vision Award" at the Big Sky Documentary Film Festival and the "Jimmy Stewart Legacy Award" at the Heartland International Film Festival.

== Background and production ==
"The Hill" was one of a few public horse stables in South Central Los Angeles, an area that has been partly zoned for agriculture since 1889. For decades the public stable was home to local equestrians, regardless of race, creed or gang affiliation.

Director Brett Fallentine first began filming cowboys riding in South Central Los Angeles in 2011. In 2012, The Hill stables burnt down mysteriously, possibly the result of arson. Fallentine began documenting the community's efforts to rebuild the stables. In addition to traditional funding, Fallentine received a California Humanities Grant and raised additional funds through a Kickstarter campaign.

== Synopsis ==
Fire on the Hill focuses on three Black cowboys of South Central Los Angeles following the destruction of "The Hill," one of the area's longest-operating horse stables. Ghuan Featherstone is an ex-soldier fighting to preserve a unique culture that stands as an alternative to crime and gang violence. Calvin Gray, who witnessed the fire, attempts to balance family responsibilities and the cowboy lifestyle. Chris Byrd pursues a career as a professional Bull Rider on the rodeo circuit.

== Reception ==
The Hollywood Reporter wrote of Fire on the Hill: "Brett Fallentine's well-observed film, embraces a burnished Wild West archetype while redefining it." Speaking on KPCC's FilmWeek, critic Christy Lemire described the film as "A really cool combination of old-fashioned Western iconography with bracing, contemporary imagery" while Amy Nicholson commented "There are these three really human stories pulling us along. I was just knocked out." Musanna Ahmed of Film Inquiry praised it as "an inspiring journey of building, rebuilding and reinforcing a community for the black community in Compton".

Fire on the Hill won the "Muse Documentary Award" at the 2018 LA Film Festival. The film also won the "Artistic Vision Award" at the 2019 Big Sky Documentary Film Festival, the "Jimmy Stewart Legacy Award" at the 2019 Heartland International Film Festival and the award for Best Documentary Feature at the 2019 Portland Film Festival.

== See also ==
- Black cowboys
- Compton Cowboys
