= The Hole, New York City =

Neighborhood in Brooklyn and Queens

Coordinates: 40.6718°N 73.8595°W

The Hole
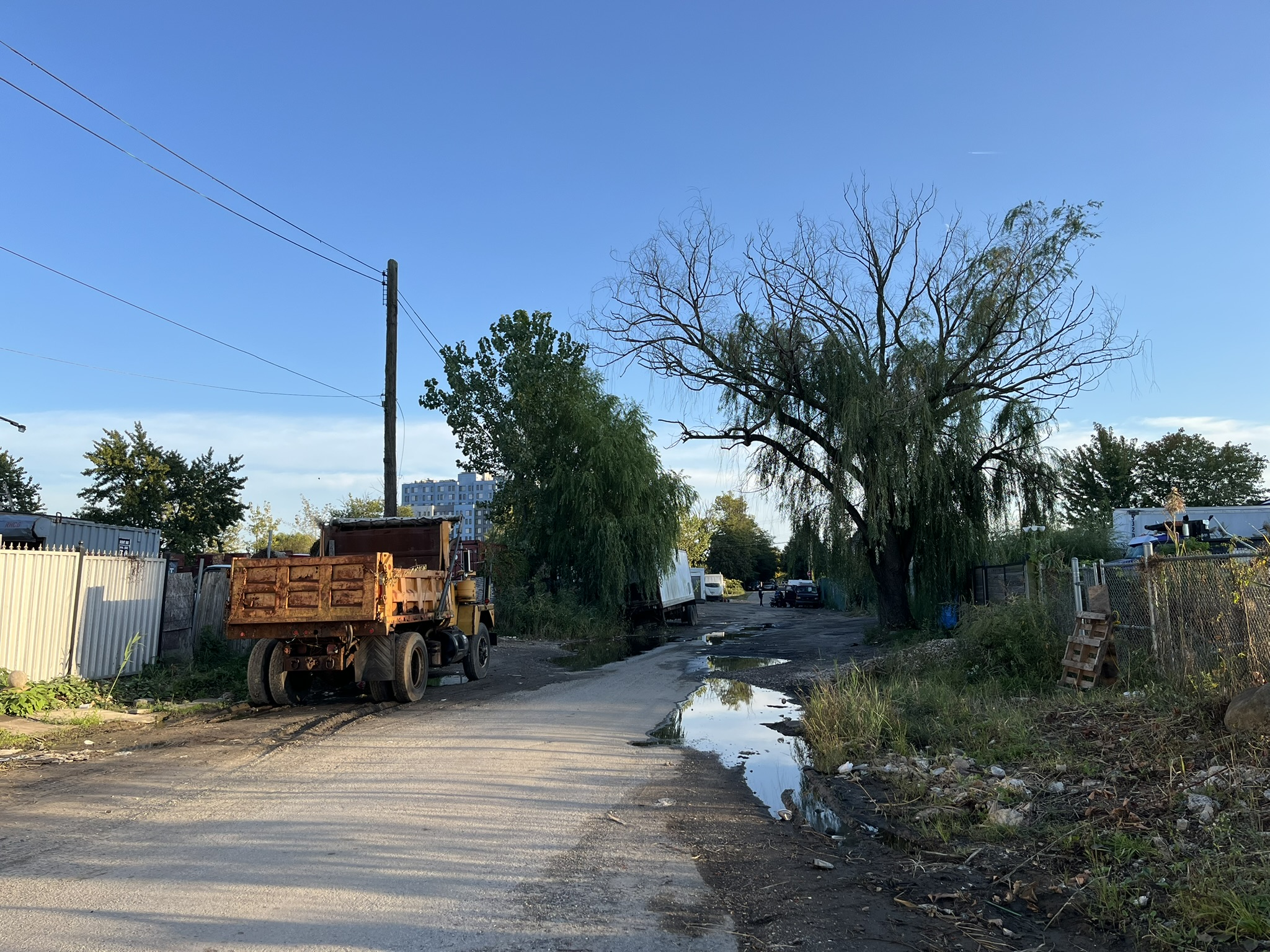
- Ruby Street in The Hole, near the Mafia Graveyard Historic Site
- Interactive map of The Hole
- City: New York City
- Boroughs: Brooklyn / Queens

The Hole, also known as the Jewel Streets neighborhood, is a small neighborhood in New York City on the border between Brooklyn and Queens. It is a low-lying area with a ground level that is 30 feet (9.1 m) lower than the surrounding area.

The area is run down and suffers from frequent flooding. It has been described as a "lost neighborhood" resembling a border town from the Wild West. Nearby neighborhoods include East New York and Lindenwood.

The New York City Department of Housing Preservation and Development's Jewel Streets Neighborhood Plan is intended to address many of the negative issues within the neighborhood.

The Hole is home to the New York City Federation of Black Cowboys.

== Boundaries ==
The Hole is generally bounded by Drew Street to the west, South Conduit Avenue to the north and east, and Linden Boulevard to the south. The area is sometimes called the Jewel Streets neighborhood because several streets are named after gems.

== Demographics ==
Because The Hole is not an officially designated neighborhood, no direct census data are published for it. However, The Hole largely overlaps with census tracts on the Brooklyn–Queens border near East New York and Lindenwood. In the 2020 United States Census, the surrounding tracts that include The Hole reported the following characteristics:

- The combined population was approximately 3,500–4,000 residents.
- The racial composition was about 45% Black or African American, 35% Hispanic or Latino, 10% White and 8% Asian.
- Median household income in the area was about $45,000–$50,000, lower than the New York City average.

While The Hole contains relatively few homes and many vacant lots, its demographics generally reflect those of adjacent neighborhoods: predominantly working-class, with significant African American and Latino populations.

== Flooding ==
In the 1960s, the level of some streets within The Hole were raised and the streets paved, facilitating passage between South Conduit Avenue and Linden Boulevard. This required homes adjacent to the raised streets to build retaining walls, with the first level of their houses now below grade. In 2004, the Department of Environmental Protection (DEP) made plans to connect the neighborhood to the city's sewer system to combat the flooding, by raising the land. As of 2023, a plan to raise the streets and connect the neighborhood to the surrounding sewer system remained in the city's capital budget, but had not been implemented.

Alternative plans have been advocated, including buying out residents and restoring the area as a natural floodplain. The city is also exploring less-expensive plant-based drainage infrastructure. Some drainage upgrades made in 2023 helped water drain more quickly after Tropical Storm Ophelia, compared to Hurricane Ida in 2021, but did not prevent flooding that trapped some residents in their homes.

While waiting for solutions from the city, residents of The Hole have implemented systems to deal with flooding, including tapping into public utilities to provide electricity for outdoor sump pumps to remove water from streets. In late 2025, the city government began collecting information from homeowners who lived in the Hole. At the time, the city was considering launching a buyout program. That October, the administration of outgoing mayor Eric Adams announced plans to upgrade the Hole's sewer system and other infrastructure. The project, costing $146 million, would include new street infrastructure, a Bluebelt draining into Spring Creek, and as many as 5,000 residences (including 1,400 on a 17-acre (6.9 ha) plot owned by the city).

== Media ==
In 2010, filmmakers Courtney Fathom Sell and Billy Feldman made a short documentary about The Hole. The film includes interviews with some of the residents and members of the Federation of Black Cowboys. The film premiered at Rooftop Films in 2011 and has since been archived at the Brooklyn Historical Society & Anthology Film Archives.

A film focused on the residents living in The Hole was made in 2016.

Brooklyn-based photographer Robert Stribley created a photoessay about The Hole in May 2016.

In July 2019, Japanese singer and professional wrestler Maki Itoh released a song about the neighborhood titled ‘Brooklyn The Hole’, which is also used as her entrance music.

An episode of the third season of the HBO comedy docuseries How To with John Wilson explores the difficulties of finding a public restroom in New York City. It features a segment on The Hole and includes interviews with residents who deal with being disconnected from the city's sewage system.

== Mafia graveyard ==
The Hole is the site of an old Mafia graveyard, located in a vacant lot off of 75th (Ruby) Street between Blake and Dumont avenues. In 1981, children playing in the lot found the body of Bonanno crime family capo Alphonse "Al" Indelicato, who, along with fellow Bonanno capos Philip "Philly Lucky" Giaccone and Dominick "Big Trin" Trinchera, had been killed several weeks before in a Brooklyn night club store room, by rival Bonanno capo Joseph Massino and his associates.

In 2004, the bodies of Giaccone and Trinchera were dug up in the lot by FBI agents and New York City police detectives. The bodies were disposed of in the lot as a favor by the crew of John Gotti, who had grown up with Massino.

Although not all of their bodies have been found, as many as six Mafia murder victims are believed by authorities to have been buried in the lot in the late 1970s and early 1980s. These include John Favara, a Queens furniture store manager killed because he accidentally ran over the 12-year-old son of John Gotti, and Lucchese crime family members Joseph Spione and Thomas DeSimone, on whom Joe Pesci's character Tommy DeVito in Goodfellas was based.

== See also ==
- East New York, Brooklyn
- Federation of Black Cowboys
- Neighborhoods in New York City
