= Ron Tarver =

American photographer (born 1957)

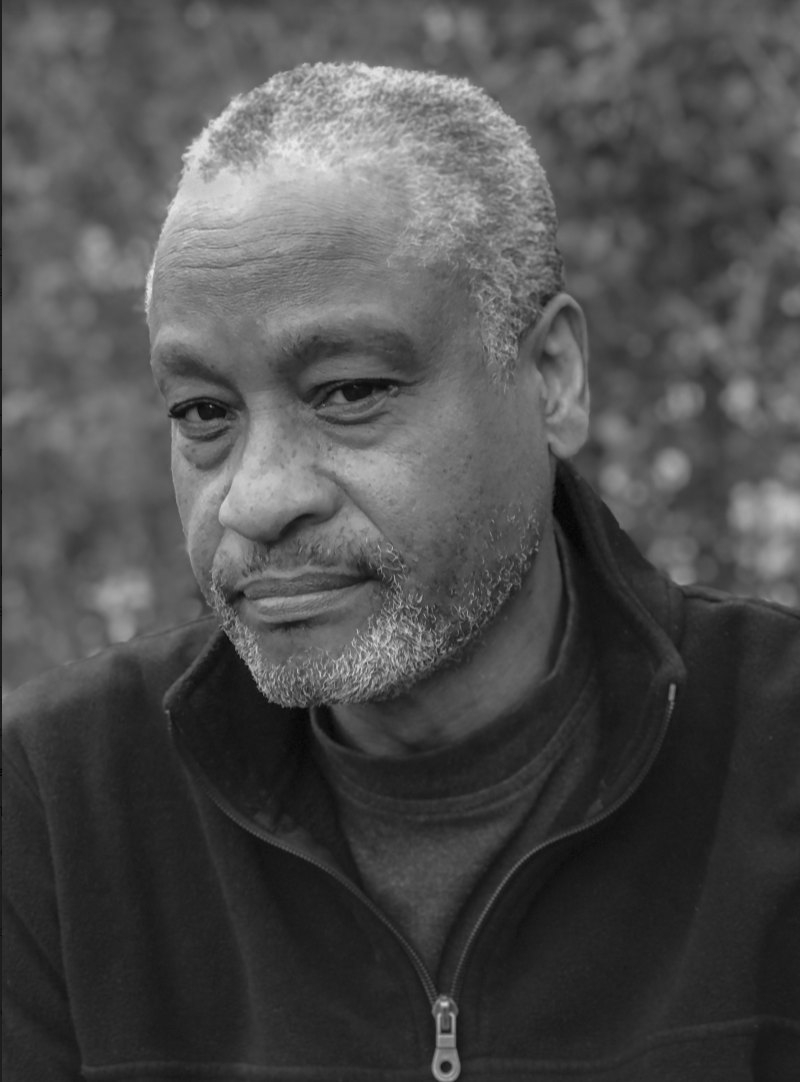
- Born: 1957 (age 68–69); Fort Gibson, Oklahoma
- Education: BFA, Northeastern State University; MFA, University of the Arts
- Website: rontarverphotographs.net

Ronald (Ron) Tarver (born 1957) is an American artist and educator. He was the first Black photographer at the Muskogee Phoenix and also worked at the Springfield News-Leader in Missouri (1980–1983), before joining The Philadelphia Inquirer. His career at the Inquirer in Philadelphia, Pennsylvania, spans more than three decades (1983–2014). Tarver currently serves as Associate Professor of Art specializing in photography at Swarthmore College.

Tarver has documented issues ranging from heroin addiction to Black cowboys to African American veterans. Tarver's photoseries The Badlands: In the Grip of Drugs earned Third Prize in the Daily Life category of the World Press Photo Awards in 1993. He is the author of The Long Ride Home: Black Cowboys in America (2024). Tarver is currently collaborating with Swarthmore College, EMIR Healing Center, and Awbury Arboretum on the House of the Living, a memorial that takes the form of a greenhouse and community farming project to honor Philadelphians whose lives were lost to homicide. Other major projects include The Long Ride Home: The Black Cowboy Experience in America, a nationwide project on Black cowboys with support from the National Geographic Development Grant, and the book We Were There: Voices of African American Veterans (2004), a collaboration with writer Yvonne Latty. In 2012, Tarver earned a Pulitzer Prize for Public Service as part of a team reporting on racialized school violence in the Philadelphia public school system.

== Life and work ==
Tarver was born in Fort Gibson, Oklahoma. The seeds of his lifelong fascination with photography were planted by his father, an avid photographer who documented much of the Black community in Fort Gibson. Tarver studied at Northeastern State University and soon after graduating was hired as the first Black photographer at the Muskogee Phoenix. In 1980, Tarver earned a position at the Springfield News-Leader in Missouri where he worked until 1983. That year, he was hired as a photographer at The Philadelphia Inquirer. During his 32-year stint at The Philadelphia Inquirer, Tarver's work spanned from extended photo essays on aftermath of the war in Beirut to conflicts within the Catholic church in Ireland.

In 1992, Tarver photographed the heroin epidemic that ravaged communities in Northeast Philadelphia in a series titled The Badlands: In the Grip of Drugs which garnered public outcry and response from the Philadelphia police department. The story was later recognized by the World Press Photo Awards in 1993, earning Third Prize in the Daily Life category. At the culmination of the Badlands project, Tarver began documenting a group of urban cowboys in North Philadelphia. This eventually expanded into a nationwide project on Black cowboys called The Long Ride Home: The Black Cowboy Experience in America, and a book that debuted on Amazon as a book in 2024, published by George Thompson Publishing. It spanned from California to Illinois to Texas with support from a National Geographic Development Grant.

In 2002, Tarver photographed 28 African-American veterans for the book We Were There: Voices of African American Veterans, from World War II to the War in Iraq. Co-authored with Yvonne Latty, the book was published by HarperCollins in 2004 and exhibited at the National Constitution Center. In 2012, Tarver was also part of the Inquirer team assembled to investigate racialized school violence in the Philadelphia public school system. The story later won a Pulitzer Prize for Public Service.

Tarver left the Inquirer in 2014, pursuing an M.F.A at the University of Arts while teaching photography at Swarthmore College. During that time, he started An Overdue Conversation with My Father, a body of work that appropriates and reimagines the photographs taken by his father in Oklahoma in the 1940s and 1950s.

Twenty years later, selected images from The Long Ride Home were exhibited as part of the Black Cowboy exhibition at the Studio Museum in Harlem in 2016, curated by Amanda Hunt. Major publications like The New York Times, Hyperallergic, The New Yorker and Vice have since written about the work.

In 2024, Tarver published The Long Ride Home: Black Cowboys in America, exploring the beauty and visual poetry of Black cowboys from ranches to city streets through 110 photographs taken in the early 90's, at the beginning of this 30-year project. The book won the Best Book in the African-American (non-fiction) category from the Next Generation Indie Book Awards, the Best Cover Design (non-fiction) from the Next Generation Indie Book Awards, the Silver Medal for Best Book of Photography from the Forward Indies Awards, the Best Book of Photography from the IPPY Awards, and was a finalist for the Best Book in the Coffee Table/Photography category from the Next Generation Indie Book Awards as well as a finalist in the History Category from the Black Authors Matter TV Awards. The book was released on Amazon and sold out within 30 days of release, earning widespread acclaim. The Photo Review wrote, "The book features Ron Tarver’s beautiful, compelling, and often surprising contemporary images of African-American cowboys that not only convey the Black cowboy’s way of life and its rich heritage, but also affirm a thriving culture of Black-owned ranches and rodeo operations, parades, inner-city cowboys, retired cowhands, and Black cowgirls of all ages, too.” The Midwest Book Review described the book as, "a genuine pleasure to browse through and an exceptionally unique, very special, and fully recommended addition to personal, community, and college/university library.” Photographer, filmmaker, and professor at Rhode Island School of Design Henry Horenstein wrote, “Ron Tarver is a treasure, as a photographer, artist, teacher, and human being. His work is well meant, smart, and relevant.” The book was also presented at the James Museum of Western and Wildlife Art in St Petersburg, Florida and the Western Spirit Museum of the West in Scottsdale, Arizona.

Tarver is founder of the House of the Living, a memorial to people lost to homicide, and a peaceful place for families and community members to heal and reflect. House of the Living is a multi-year collaboration between EMIR (Every Murder is Real) Healing Center and Swarthmore College that addresses the homicide epidemic in Philadelphia in an unprecedented way. In the first phase of the project, the group built on FarmerJawn’s previous work of revitalizing an abandoned greenhouse and the surrounding landscape in Elkins Park. They also conducted trauma-informed interviews of victims’ families, and designed and installed 90 engraved acrylic panels with the portraits and names of homicide victims from Philadelphia. This phase was backed by a grant from the Engaged Humanities Studios of the Lang Center at Swarthmore College. Together with Swarthmore Assistant Professors Jody Joyner and Sony Devabhaktuni, as well as volunteer project coordinator Laura Oliver, Tarver is now working with EMIR Healing Center and Awbury Arboretum to establish a second phase of the project.

Tarver's work has been exhibited nationally and internationally in over 30 solo and 50 group exhibitions and is included in many private, corporate, and museum collections, including the Philadelphia Museum of Art, State Museum of Pennsylvania in Harrisburg, the Smithsonian American Art Museum in Washington DC. His work is represented by Robin Rice Gallery in New York, Soho-Myriad in Atlanta, Georgia, and Grand Image in Seattle, Washington. Tarver has lectured at various institutions, including The Barnes Foundation, the Rosenbach Museum, and the Woodmere Art Museum. He has also taught at Drury University, Perkins Center for the Arts, Samuel S. Fleisher Art Memorial, and the Princeton Photography Club.

== Publications ==
- Author, The Long Ride Home: Black Cowboys in America: George F. Thompson Publishing,
- Co-authored with Yvonne Latty, We Were There: Voices of African American Veterans, from World War II to the War in Iraq, New York: HarperCollins, 2004. ISBN 978-0060542177

== Awards ==
- 2024 Winner of Next Generation Indie Book Awards for the best book in the African American (non-fiction) category, for The Long Ride Home: Black Cowboys in America
- 2024 Winner of Next Generation Indie Book Awards for the best cover design (non-fiction), for The Long Ride Home: Black Cowboys in America
- 2024 Finalist of the Next Generation Indie Book Awards for the best book in the Coffee Table/Photography category, for The Long Ride Home: Black Cowboys in America
- 2024 Finalist of the Black Authors Matter TV Awards in the History Category, for The Long Ride Home: Black Cowboys in America
- 2024 Silver Medal of the Forward Indies Awards for the Best Book in Photography, for The Long Ride Home: Black Cowboys in America
- 2024 Winner of the IPPY Awards for the Best Book of Photography, for The Long Ride Home: Black Cowboys in America
- 2021 Guggenheim Fellowship from the John Simon Guggenheim Memorial Foundation. for photography
- 2007 and 2019 Independence Foundation Fellowship
- 2012 Pulitzer Prize for Public Service, as part of the team covering racialized school violence
- 2007 Fleisher Wind Challenge
- 2001 Pew Fellowship in the Arts
- 1994 National Geographic Magazine, Development Grant for Documentary Photography
- 1993 Sigma Delta Chi Award of the Society of Professional Journalists
- 1993 World Press Photo, Third Prize for Daily Life
- 1992 Nation Press Photographers / Association University of Missouri Pictures of the Year awards, Third Place
