= Concrete Cowboy =

2020 film by Ricky Staub

- Official promotional poster
- Directed by: Ricky Staub
- Screenplay by: Ricky Staub; Dan Walser
- Based on: Ghetto Cowboy by Greg Neri
- Produced by: Idris Elba; Tucker Tooley; Lee Daniels; Jeff Waxman; Dan Walser
- Starring: Idris Elba; Caleb McLaughlin; Jharrel Jerome; Byron Bowers; Lorraine Toussaint; Clifford "Method Man" Smith
- Cinematography: Minka Farthing-Kohl
- Edited by: Luke Ciarrocchi
- Music by: Kevin Matley
- Production companies: Tucker Tooley Entertainment; Green Door Pictures; Lee Daniels Entertainment; Neighborhood Film Co.
- Distributed by: Netflix
- Release dates: September 14, 2020 (TIFF); April 2, 2021 (United States)
- Running time: 111 minutes
- Country: United States
- Language: English
- Budget: ~$10 million

Concrete Cowboy is a 2020 American coming-of-age Western drama film directed by Ricky Staub from a screenplay by Staub and Dan Walser. Based on the novel Ghetto Cowboy by Greg Neri, it was inspired by the real urban African-American horseriding culture of Philadelphia, specifically, the Fletcher Street Urban Riding Club. It stars Idris Elba, Caleb McLaughlin, Jharrel Jerome, Byron Bowers, Lorraine Toussaint, and Clifford "Method Man" Smith. While the film is completely fictional, several real members of the Fletcher Street riding community play supporting characters who give voice to real issues that the community faces.

Concrete Cowboy had its world premiere at the Toronto International Film Festival on September 14, 2020, and was digitally released on Netflix on April 2, 2021.

== Plot ==
Fifteen-year-old Cole is from Detroit and always getting in trouble at school, so his mom drives him to Philadelphia to live with his estranged father, Harp. Dropping him off on Harp's North Philadelphia block, she quickly drives away. A neighbor, Nessie, recognizes Cole, and tells him his father is at the stables.

When Harp brings him in the house, Cole finds a horse standing in the living room, and the fridge and cupboards empty. He says he'll only stay one night. The next day when trying to call his mom, he runs into his older cousin, Smush, who drives him around and gets him some food. The two stay out all night. When Smush drops Cole off at Harp's the next morning, Harp will not let Cole in because Cole has been hanging out with Smush, a drug dealer. Cole refuses to accept Harp's rules, stalks off and asks various neighbors, including Nessie, whether he can stay at their house. The answer is always no. He ends up crawling through a window and finds himself face to face with a horse. At first, he is terrified, but he soon realizes that the horse doesn't intend to hurt him.

The next morning, Nessie finds Cole asleep in the stall with the horse standing nearby. It is revealed that the horse he has bunked with, Boo, has a reputation of not letting anyone near him. No one has been able to tame him- in fact, it could have killed him. Instead, it let him spend the night in the stall with him.

Cole tells the other riders he wants to learn how to ride, and is told he first must help with the stable work. He spends the day learning how to efficiently shovel manure under the instructions of Paris, a rider who uses a wheelchair. He continues to spend time at the stables and secretly with Smush as well. Harp later has a surprise for Paris - a saddle that allows Paris to ride his horse.

Cole gets upset and heads back to Harp's. Harp finds him there, and they get into an argument: Cole feels that Harp gives love to everyone except him. Harp tells him he also used to deal, and went to prison before Cole was born. Harp tells Cole he named him after jazz musician John Coltrane, a fellow Philadelphian who grew up without a father, because he wanted his son to be able to succeed as well.

Smush used to be a rider, too, but began dealing drugs to save up money to buy a ranch out West. One night Boo gets loose and the riders find him in a field. They surround him, but Harp tells Cole he is the only one who can calm Boo. Cole hesitantly approaches and is able to throw the reins over Boo and mount him.

Smush and Cole set up a drug deal that goes bad, and another dealer tries to kidnap Smush. The cops appear, chasing Smush and Cole, but they escape. Smush says they almost have enough money to move West, but Cole says he is done with that life. At the stables, Animal Control has arrived to seize all the horses due to neighbor complaints. Harp says there is nothing they can do, and Cole calls him a coward. Cole finds Smush, and they go on another drug deal. Smush is shot to death by a kid on a bike, and Cole runs.

Harp searches for Cole, eventually finding him hiding in the stables. Washing the blood off Cole's hands, he tells him Smush needs a proper memorial. That night they break into the municipal stables and free the horses. Everyone rides their horses slowly through the neighborhood to the cemetery, where Cole places Smush's cowboy boots on his grave, then stands on the back of his horse for the first time.

Not long afterward, they all watch as the stables are demolished, but Harp says they will keep riding even without their stables. Cole's mom returns to Philadelphia, and Harp thanks her for sending Cole to live with him.

== Cast ==
- Caleb McLaughlin as Cole
- Idris Elba as Harp
- Jharrel Jerome as Smush
- Byron Bowers as Rome
- Lorraine Toussaint as Nessie
- Clifford "Method Man" Smith as Leroy
- Ivannah-Mercedes as Esha
- Devenie Young as Trena
- Jamil Prattis as Paris
- Michael O.G LAW Tabon as Jalen

== Production ==
In August 2019, it was announced that Idris Elba, Caleb McLaughlin, Jharrel Jerome, Lorraine Toussaint, Byron Bowers and Method Man had joined the cast of the film, with Ricky Staub directing in his feature film directorial debut from a screenplay by himself and Dan Wasler based upon the novel Ghetto Cowboy by Greg Neri. Elba and Lee Daniels served as producers on the film. The role of Amahle was originally written to be a drug addict, and when Liz Priestley auditioned for the role she built up a few days of sleep deprivation to make her performance believable. The character was later rewritten to be a nurse.

Filming began in North Philadelphia in August 2019. Staub originally got the idea for the film after seeing a man riding a horse down a Philadelphia street, which led him to research the Fletcher Street Urban Riding Club and the discovery of Neri's book.

== Release ==
The film was set to have its world premiere at the Telluride Film Festival in September 2020, prior to its cancellation due to the COVID-19 pandemic. Its world premiere was then held at the Toronto International Film Festival on September 13, 2020. In October 2020, Netflix acquired distribution rights to the film for a release in 2021. In March 2021, it was announced that the film will be released on April 2, 2021.

== Reception ==
On the review aggregator website Rotten Tomatoes, the film holds an approval rating of 80% based on 121 reviews, with an average rating of 6.6/10. The website's critics consensus reads: "Well-acted and solidly directed, Concrete Cowboy lassos old-fashioned uplift with its story of a father and son in a little-seen corner of American culture." On Metacritic, the film has a weighted average score of 67 out of 100, based on 33 critics, indicating "generally favorable" reviews.

== See also ==
- Black cowboys
