= Billy Ray Thunder =

American rodeo performer (born 1954)

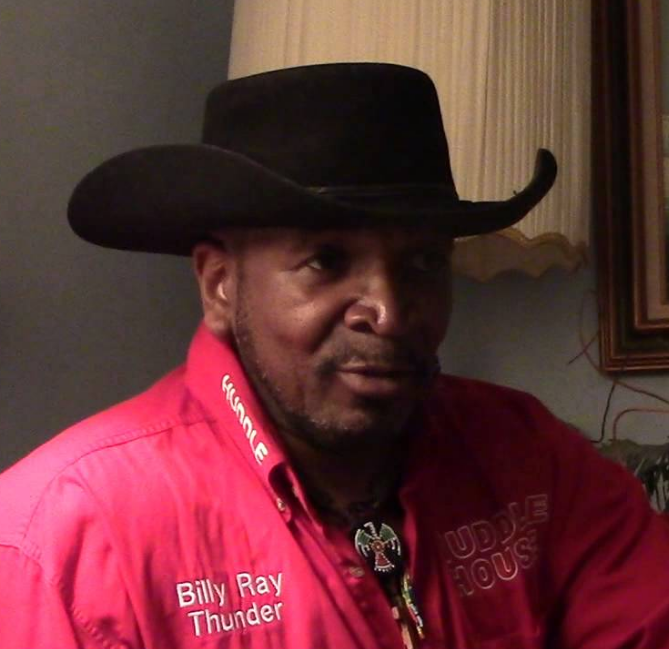
- Thunder in 2015
- Born: William Ray Higginbottom; September 20, 1954 (age 71); Akron, Ohio, United States
- Education: Archbishop Hoban High School
- Occupations: Truck driver; bronc rider; bull rider; Army medic; Navy corpsman; semi pro football player
- Height: 6 ft 3 in (191 cm)
- Children: Victoria and William

Billy Ray Thunder (born William Ray Higginbottom) is an African American professional rodeo cowboy who specializes in bull riding and bareback bronc riding. He has been active for over 30 years. He is nicknamed "The Living Legend".

== Early life ==
Billy Ray Higginbottom was born in Akron, Ohio, on September 20, 1954. He has African-American heritage from both of his parents, and his father had been a local expert on horses. Billy Ray identifies as a Black Indian, saying his grandfather was "a Heron black American." Thunder is 6'3" tall and weights 225 pounds.

=== Education ===
He attended Archbishop Hoban High School from 1969 to 1973, where he was a defensive end on the school football team. After graduating in 1973, he joined the Army, followed by a stint in the Navy before re-enlisting in the Army. He then transitioned to attempt professional football.

== Career ==
While in the service, Billy Ray was also part of a semi-pro football team in Germany. He tried out for the Washington Redskins and the Dallas Cowboys, but did not make either team. After a short stint at the University of Akron, Billy Ray discovered riding.

His stepbrother, Anthony Winfield, invited Billy Ray to a rodeo in Georgia, where he was going to do some bull riding. African Americans left the South and an agrarian lifestyle in a series of migrations during the early part of the 20th century. Rodeos, horses, and bulls and access to them are few, and far between, in modern-day cities. The portrayal of "The Wild, Wild West," cowboys and rodeos as all white, or nearly all white, and has not made a career in rodeo any attractive to most urbanized African Americans.

As the story goes, Billy Ray met some buckle bunnies there and wishing to impress them, bragged about his riding skills. His stepbrother offered to loan his outfit and set everything up for him to show off his non-existent riding skills. Anthony and Billy Ray agreed that Billy Ray would mount up and ready himself, inside the gate, on top of a 2,000-pound bull. Anthony was supposed to pull him off before the gate opened, but Anthony did not pull him off, and Billy Ray ended up in the hospital with a couple of broken ribs, and the girl by his side. For the next 19 years, Billy Ray rode bulls in several pro-rodeo events around the world sanctioned by the Rodeo Cowboys Association (RCA), which was later renamed the Professional Rodeo Cowboys Association (PRCA), and the International Professional Rodeo Association (IPRA). Most recently, Billy Ray has been riding bucking horses.

His long career places him in the senior category. Many rodeo cowboys do not continue to compete professionally beyond their 30s. When Billy Ray began, as with jockeys, the majority of bull riders and bareback bronc riders were much smaller than Billy Ray.

=== Mentoring ===
Billy Ray has worked to motivate young Black people to engage in the rodeo tradition of America's black cowboys, like Bill Pickett, Nat Love, Bose Ikard, James Beckwourth, Stagecoach Mary and Bass Reeves. Each of these individuals made notable contributions to the American cowboy tradition and the history of the American West. Billy Ray has counseled and mentored youths about how they can begin to be involved in the continuation of an American tradition and earn college scholarships.
