= National Multicultural Western Heritage Museum =

Hall of Fame for rodeo

Coordinates: 32.7415°N 97.27619°W

National Multicultural Western Heritage Museum and Hall of Fame
- Former name: National Cowboys of Color Museum and Hall of Fame
- Established: February 1, 2001
- Location: 2201 Dottie Lynn Parkway, Suite 115, Fort Worth, TX 76120
- Type: Western History Museum and Hall of Fame
- Website: https://nmwhm.org

The National Multicultural Western Heritage Museum, formerly the National Cowboys of Color Museum and Hall of Fame, is a museum and hall of fame in Fort Worth, Texas.

== History ==
The National Multicultural Western Heritage Museum was founded February 1, 2001, by Jim and Gloria Austin of Fort Worth, Texas. Their objective was to recognize the individual contributions of many groups from the Western Frontier. Included in these groups are people of Hispanic, Native American, European, Asian, and African descent. Many of these people have stories that only this organization will tell. The organization was renamed to its present name in 2008 to better encompass the varied history of the museum.

== About the museum ==
The museum is located at 2201 Dottie Lynn Parkway, Suite 115, Fort Worth, Texas 76120. (817) 534-8801 Museum, (817) 922-9999 Business Office. Along with the Museum's Hall of Fame that held its first induction in 2003, there are also permanent exhibits that include Bass Reeves, Bill Pickett, the Buffalo Soldiers, Tuskegee Airmen, Native American Indian Chiefs, Native Heritage and the Vaquero, Escaramuza and Hispanic Heritage, to name a few.

== Hall of Fame Inductees ==
2022

- DeBoraha Akin-Townson
- Harry Belafonte
- Anthony "Tony" Brubaker
- Reginald T. Dorsey
- Danny Glover
- Albert "Al" & Essie Morris
- Chris Navarro
- Sammy Davis Jr.
- Sir Sidney Poitier

2021

- Obba Babatunde
- Darrell Barron
- Aldrich Everett
- Clarence Gonzales
- Lynn Hart
- Jean Prescott

2019

- Valeria Vason Cunningham
- Lu Vason
- Double R Rodeo Livestock Company - C K Reid
- Taylor Hall Jr., aka "Bailey's Prairie Kid
- Wes Studi
- James Pickens Jr.
- Michael Aku Ro Driguez

2018

- Douglas Harmon, Ph.D.
- Will Arthur "Artie" Morris
- Jay Novacek
- Eugene "Gene" Smith*
- James Watson Jr.
- Libby Willis
- Dale Evans (posthumous induction)
- Roy Rogers (posthumous induction)
- John Ware (posthumous induction)
- Charley Willis (posthumous induction)

2017 Inductees

- Billy and Pam Minick
- Bob Tallman
- Fort Worth Herd
- Scott Murray
- Wilbert D. "Wil" Robinson - Posthumous Inductee
- William J. Grandstaff - Posthumous Inductee

2016 Inductees

- Cleveland Walters
- Floyd Frank
- Hub Baker
- Isador "Lolo" Munoz
- James Beckwourth
- Timmy Brooks

2015 Inductees

- Danell Tipton
- Gordon Wade Tonips
- Harvey Means
- Holt Hickman
- Jamie Foxx
- Judge Paul L. Brady
- Randy White
- Steve Murrin
- Walt Garrison

2014 Inductees

- Anne Lockhart
- Barry Corbin
- Nathan Jean Whitaker Sanders aka "Mama Sugar"
- Vincent Jacobs

2013 Inductees

- Monroe Tahmahkera (Posthumous)

2012-2013 Inductees

- Burl Washington, Texas
- Colonel Allen Allensworth*, California (Posthumous)
- Floyd "Buck" Wyatt*, Oklahoma (Posthumously)
- Fred Whitfield, Texas
- James Butler Hickok (Posthumously)
- Lawrence Homer Coffee, Texas
- Mollie Taylor Stevenson Jr., Texas
- Pam Grier, Colorado
- Walt Willey, Illinois
- Woody Strode*, California (Posthumously)

2011 Inductees

- Freddie "Skeet" Gordon
- Glynn Turman
- Joe Beaver
- Peter Perkins Pitchlynn
- Ruth Scantlin Roach
- Shirlie Sanders
- Walter Clarence "Buck" Taylor
- William "Will" Penn Adair Rogers

2010 Inductees

- Abe Morris
- Charles Hank Banks
- Harold Cash
- Lowell "Stretch" Smith
- Paul J. Matthews
- Robert Strauss

2009 Inductees

- Albino Tais (Posthumous)
- Alex Dees
- Ben F. Tahmahkera
- Calvin Norris Greely Jr. (Posthumous)
- Dean Smith
- Henry Harris (Posthumous)
- Isaac Burns Murphy (Posthumous)
- Mayisha Akbar

2008 Inductees

- Art T. Burton
- Holt Collier
- Matthew 'Bones' Hooks
- Paul Cleveland
- Taylor H. Haynes, M.D.
- Tommie Haw
- Willie Thomas

2007 Inductees

- Cathay Williams
- Frank White
- Nathaniel 'Rex' Purefoy
- Red Steagall
- Rufus Green Sr.
- Tom Three Persons
- Verna Lee Booker Hightower

2006 Inductees

- Bass Reeves*
- Charley Pride
- Colonel Juan Seguin*
- George Fletcher
- Jackson Sundown
- Ken Pollard
- Knox Simmons
- Patricia E. Kelly
- Rosieleetta Lee Reed

2005 Inductees

- Ed 'Pop' Landers
- Gerardo 'Jerry' Diaz
- Luke 'Leon' Coffee
- Melvin 'Mel' Carnell Blount
- Vicki Herrera Adams

2004 Inductees

- Jim Lane
- Mantan Moreland
- Mary Fields
- Walter Charles Morse

2003 Inductees

- Bill Pickett
- Bose Ikard
- Charlie Sampson
- Herb Jeffries
- Jose 'Pepe' Diaz
- Myrtis Dightman
- Quanah Parker
- Steven R. Heape

== See also ==
- Black American West Museum and Heritage Center in Denver, Colorado
- Black cowboys
- List of museums in North Texas
