= New York City Federation of Black Cowboys =

Organization for horsemanship training

Coordinates: 40.669978°N 73.856739°W

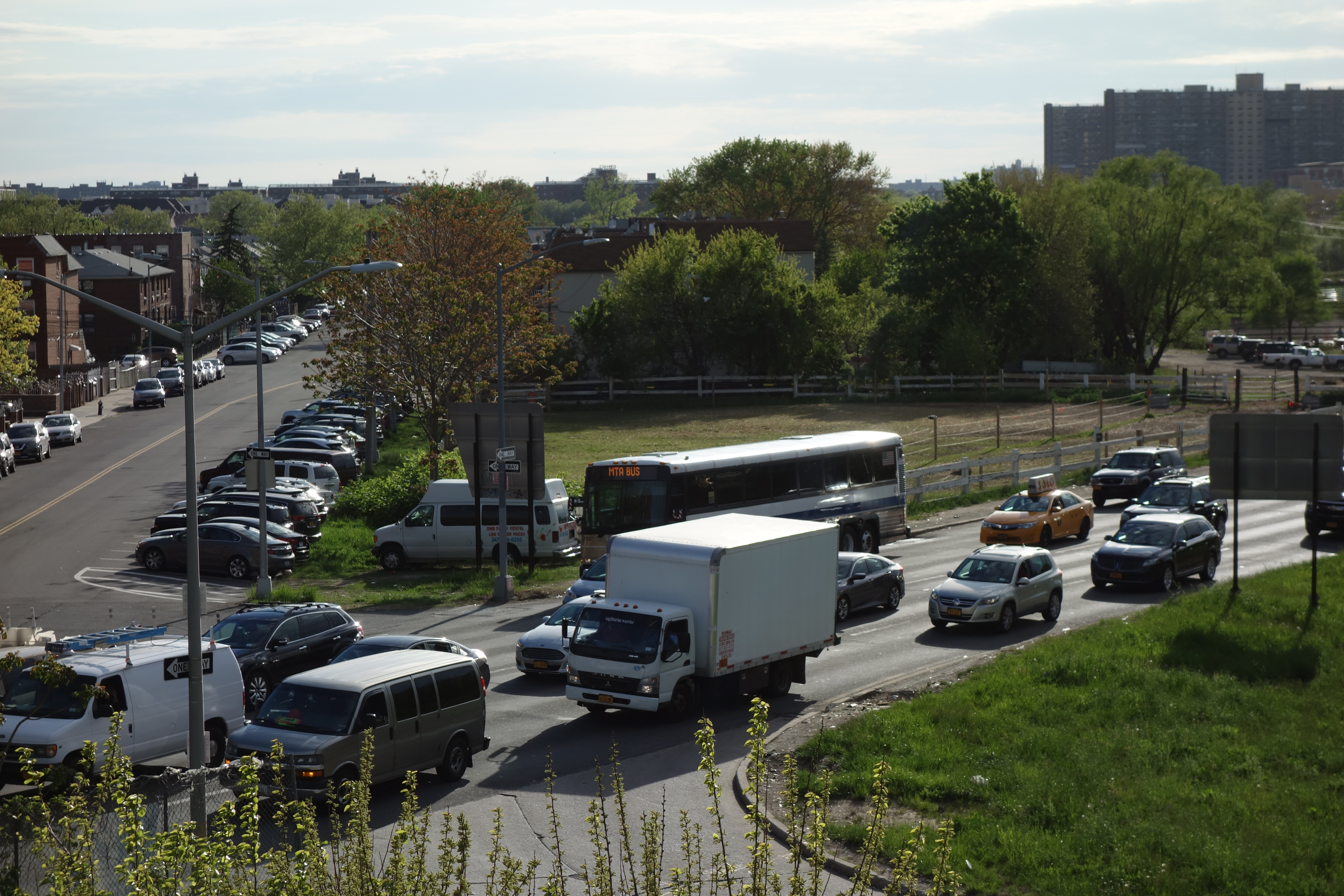
The Cedar Lane Stables in Queens, used by the federation from 1998 to 2016

The New York City Federation of Black Cowboys (FBC) is an organization dedicated to horsemanship training, children's education, and keeping alive the traditions of African-American cowboys from the Old West. It is located in The Hole, a low-lying neighborhood on the border of Brooklyn and Queens in New York City. The FBC participates in educational tours, youth horseback riding training, and public events such as riding horseback for 8 hours "from one end of Brooklyn to the other."

During the 1870s and 1880s, African-American cowboys made up approximately 25% of the 35,000 cowboys in the Western Frontier. The Federation honors this legacy through youth programs, rodeos, and school visits, while also using horsemanship to teach local youth life skills such as patience, kindness, and tolerance.

As of 2019, the organization's president is Kesha "Mama" Morse. She is the organization's first female president.

== History ==
The Federation of Black Cowboys was officially incorporated in 1994 and leased the Cedar Lane Stables in Queens from the Parks Department.

In 2012, six horses died in the Cedar Lane Stables, forcing the city to close the stables while the Federation renovated.

Licensing for the stables occurs annually, and historically the Federation was the sole bidder. Their last licensing agreement was for 2015, when the city released a public Request for Proposal (RFP). In February 2016, FBC was informed their license would not be renewed. They were outbid by GallopNYC, a non-profit aiding disabled people through therapeutic horsemanship. Despite this, New York City officials claimed that the FBC provides "positive historical contribution to the community and to horse riding in New York City."

In 2019, denim brand Wrangler created a short film about the organization as part of its Wrangler Legends video series.

On Juneteenth in 2022, the FBC collaborated with jazz composer Allan Harris to present a musical, Cross That River, in the Richard Rodgers Amphitheater in Marcus Garvey Park, Manhattan. The musical tells the story of "Blu, who runs away from slavery to become a cowboy out west," and was presented by NYC Parks, City College Center for the Arts, Jazzmobile, and Love Productions. That year, the FBC was featured at the Battery Park Juneteenth celebration, providing "a brief history of Juneteenth" alongside bluesmen Michael Hill, Jerry Dugger, Junior Mack and Bill McClellan, after which children could attend pony rides.

== See also ==
- Compton Cowboys
- Fletcher Street Urban Riding Club
- Oakland Black Cowboy Association
- African-American trail rides
