= When I Get Home (film) =

2019 short film

- Directed by: Solange Knowles
- Produced by: John Bogaard; Alec Eskander; Alan Ferguson; Gina Harrell; Nic Neary; Alex D. Sanchez; Nina Soriano; Pete Williams
- Starring: Solange; Adam Jabari Davis; Jessica Figaro
- Cinematography: Ryan Marie Helfant; Chayse Irvin
- Edited by: Solange Knowles
- Production company: Saint Records
- Distributed by: Apple Music
- Release date: March 1, 2019
- Running time: 33 minutes (original); 41 minutes (extended)
- Country: United States
- Language: English

When I Get Home is a 2019 American musical short film directed and edited by singer-songwriter Solange Knowles, who also starred in the film with Adam Jabari Davis and Jessica Figaro. Apart from Knowles', the film features contributions from filmmakers Alan Ferguson, Terence Nance and Ray Tintori, artists Jacolby Satterwhite, with additional contributions from artists Autumn Knight and Robert Pruitt.

The film serves as a visual companion to the studio album of the same name, featuring all the 17 tracks in the narrative. Exploring Knowles' hometown in Houston, Texas, it thematically asks the individual for how much people would bring with or leave behind in the process of human evolution, thereby exploring the concepts of origin, fear, safety and reclamation through power of ancestral roots.

Produced by Knowles' record label Saint Records, When I Get Home was released in conjunction with the album on March 1, 2019, exclusively through Apple Music and later released through iTunes, the following week. A 41-minute director's cut was also premiered digitally in December 2019.

== Synopsis ==
The film finds Knowles's deeply introspective vision of a spiritual expedition reckoning with the question "Where is home?". It taps into imagery of her hometown's [Houston] culture with surrealism that spotlights Black cowboys, space, futurist worlds, and ritualistic movements characterizing evolution as a recurring presence. Through this film, she further explores concepts of origin, fear, safety, and reclamation through the power of ancestral roots. The film also featured an animated version of "Sound of Rain", which is a surreal, game-world animation similar to the visuals of online virtual world platform Second Life.

== Production ==
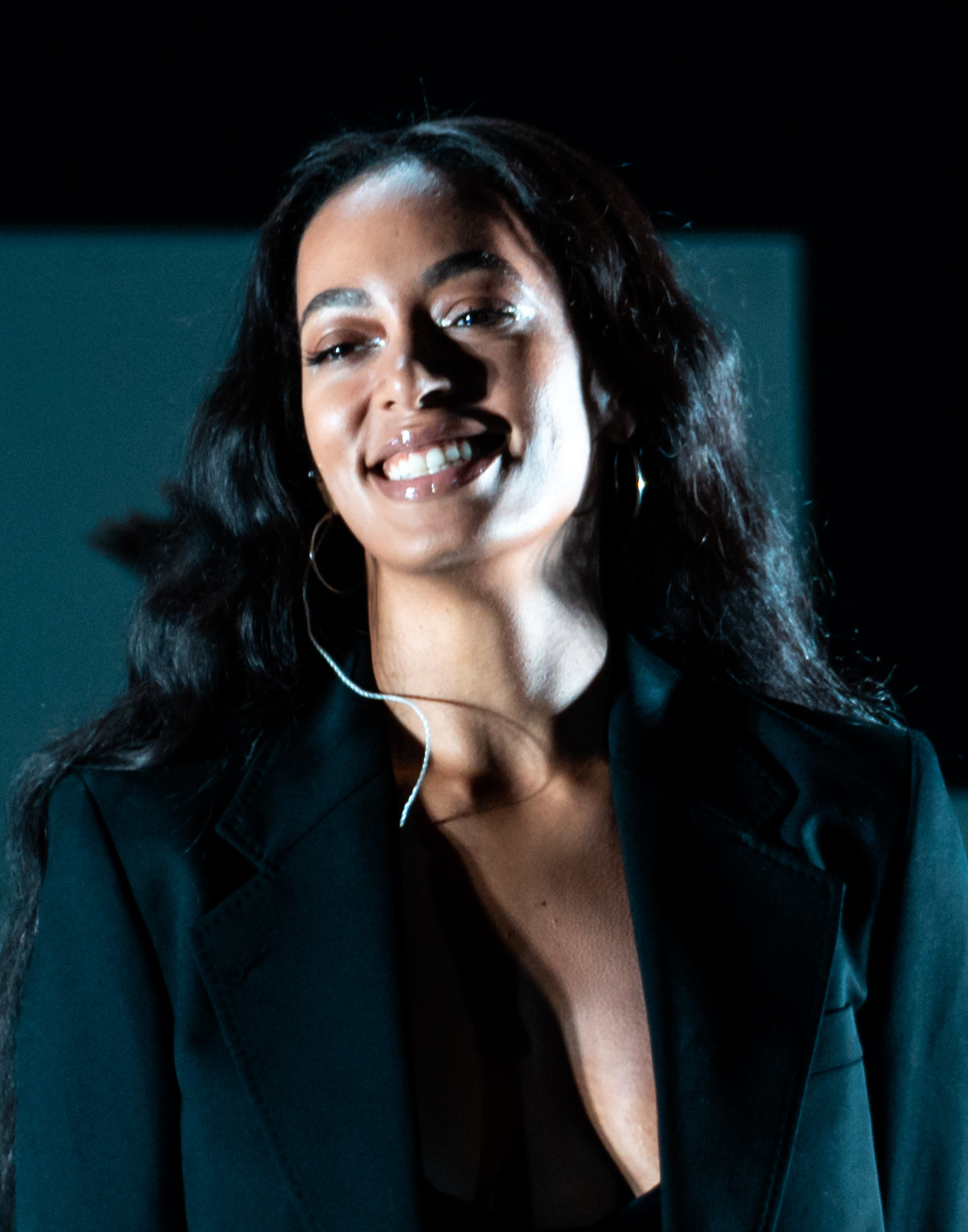
Actor, director and editor Solange Knowles

In an interaction with writer and art curator Antwaun Sargent, Knowles said that she had an idea on having a film as a visual component to her album, so as to extend her vision to what cannot be articulated sonically and cited a production of The Wiz—a stage musical, she did when she was younger—as a part of her motivation, adding that it was the first time she had a clear vision to emote the parts of herself, that she could not do so, through dance or music and the film was an extension of her vision.

Her inspiration on working with fellow members in her country helped her forming a renaissance of surreal and experimental work from black artists which reframes and challenges the age-old traditions outsiders associate, calling it as "one of the most exciting things, to be able to connect and hone in with Texas artists and filmmakers who are really shifting the nature of how we’re experiencing these things." She further recalled that, a year-and-a-half ago, she wanted to tell a story about black cowboys as she felt "really important to herself", as she did a Calvin Klein campaign that centered around Americana and met several of the black cowboys and "hear their stories and see them pray before they go in the bull ring and see what they're willing to do to their bodies for the sake of entertainment" which she felt something she could relate to.

Solange designed the large scale sculptures and sets for the film, for which she described as: "when I think about sculpture and creating sculpture, I'm thinking about the possibility of some young black girl in 20 years, needing to reference a black sculptor who's making work that large, and landscape like that. And the blessing, the privilege that I might come up on that search." In addition to directing, she also edited the film with her collaborators insisting on experimentation and felt that editing gives her the space to experiment her work.

While most of the film centered around live-action footage filmed at Texas, the film also had animation components. According to Jacolby Satterwhite, who animated, directed and produced under Knowles' guidance, during September–November 2018, recalled that Knowles had collected hundreds of images and a visual palette to accompany the animation prospects. He recalled the need for animation as the conclusion, lives under the guise of Afrofuturism—which is according to Satterwhite, is like "entering a futuristic unreal space as a form of escapism".

"I believe that whenever you have something like surreal science fiction or animation clashing with live action, it speaks to an escapism. A lot of people liked a lot of my practice with Afrofuturism, which is a practice that involves going to outer space to avoid the politics of being on earth. It's a practice to avoid the politics of oppression and to disembody yourself into another place and really find home. It's kind of like a psychological space, a spiritual space, and a space of reconcile. It's the end of the film, so in a way it's kind of like extrapolating yourself, or bringing yourself into an existential mode where you're more centered."

— Jacolby Satterwhite, about the need for animated components in the short film

For making visuals for the track "Sound of Rain", it was described as a "natural, organic synesthesia" where the sonic templates matches the palette and the lyrics were "defiant, confident and organic" based on their conversations in Los Angeles. Trina was involved in the animated version, as Satterwhite was working with the rapper on his unfinished film, who felt that "her footage really aligned with what I was trying to gain from the 'Sound of Rain' project, even with her gesticulations in relationship to the lyrics" and the references to Miami on the album, felt great to conceptually have her on the video. He projected Third Ward footage into the animation on Knowles' decision, as he originally had Texas footage in it and changed to some other location. He further added that the black rodeo and other references to Texas were ideas he had in his animation archives.

== Release ==
When I Get Home was released as an Apple Music exclusive on March 1, 2019, in conjunction with Knowles' eponymous album. At the same date it was premiered at selected local venues for members of the Black Houston community. The film was also made available on iTunes, the following week in standard definition, high definition and UHD.

== Director's cut ==
A director's cut of the film was announced in the mid-July 2019 for theatrical premiere. With the inclusion of new scenes and musical arrangements (including a previously unreleased song "Dreams (Demo/2)"), the cut—8 minutes longer than the original—was premiered in several museums and art institutions across several cities in United States, as well as premiering in London and Paris. It was later released digitally on December 12, 2019. On the first anniversary of the album's premiere, the limited edition DVDs of the director's cut was sold along with other merchandise at her BlackPlanet page, and on its second anniversary, the director's cut was remastered and uploaded to The Criterion Channel. Stills from the film were exclusively made available on BlackPlanet to commemorate a week-long celebration of the album.

== Reception ==
Commenting on the film treatment of the album, Spin writer Israel Daramola admitted that "the perfect, elaborate choreography and curated visual set pieces make you feel less inspiration than respect for Solange's talent, professionalism and workmanship." Paula Rogo of Essence praised the film's "eye-catching visuals" and called it "breathtaking".

== Accolades ==
Year	Award	Nominee/Work	Category	Result	Ref.
2019	Clio Awards	When I Get Home Visual Album Launch	Music Marketing (Bronze)	Won	
