= Vicki Adams (trick rider) =

American trick rider

Vicki Adams (born May 13, 1951) is a ProRodeo Hall of Fame cowgirl.

== Life ==
Vicki Adams was born Vicki Herrera on May 13, 1951, on the Yakima Indian Reservation in Toppenish, Washington. She is of mixed Native American heritage. Adams' mother was enrolled Yakama. Adams' ethnicity was Yakama, Snohomish, Puyallup, Cowlitz, Cayuse, and Umatilla. However, Adams choose Cowlitz to be enrolled. This was due to her great-great-grandmother's mother being full blood Cowlitz. Her given Indian name is Le Yi Ah. This name means "women who sews fast".

Her father was a rodeo champion who taught his daughter rodeo. She was a barrel racer in an Indian association. She also performed trick riding. In 1969, she was an alternate Miss Indian America. At 18, she met and married Leon Adams.

== Career ==
For five decades, Leon and Vicki were a team who entertained rodeo audiences with their roman riding, trick riding, dancing horses, and trained bulls. They performed throughout the United States and in some other countries. They resided in Stuart, Oklahoma. The Adams operated a 2,500 acre ranch in Stuart.

Both of them competed on the Professional Rodeo Cowboys Association, the top circuit in the United States. In 1982 Leon was awarded the PRCA Specialty Act of the Year; in 1984 Vicki received the award. After that, they both won the award in 1987 and 1997. For 19 straight years, they were nominated for the award.

== Honors ==
Along with the ProRodeo Hall of Fame, Adams was inducted into the National Multicultural Western Heritage Museum and Hall of Fame in 2005. Adams was presented with the Tad Lucas Award from the National Cowboy and Western Heritage Museum in 2012.

== Retirement and Leon's death ==
Leon retired from competition into 2005. Adams retired in 2006. Leon was inducted into the ProRodeo Hall of Fame in 2008 and died on October 30, 2017, in Stuart, Oklahoma.
