= Verna Lee Hightower =

African-American rodeo rider and activist

- Born: Verna Lee Booker; June 26, 1930; Spring, Texas, United States
- Died: August 27, 1970 (aged 40)
- Other name: Boots
- Occupations: Rodeo cowgirl, civil rights activist.

Verna Lee "Boots" Booker Hightower (June 26, 1930 – August 27, 1970) was an American rodeo cowgirl and civil rights activist. She is recognized for being the first African-American woman to become an official member of the Girl's Rodeo Association and compete in barrel racing at the Houston Livestock Show and Rodeo.

== Biography ==
Verna Lee Booker was born on June 26, 1930, in Spring, Texas. She was the daughter of Arthur Booker and Alvirita Wells and had a love of horses at an early age. Arthur and Alvirita had five children and raised them on the family's fruit tree farm where Verna Lee gained her nickname "Boots". The Booker's marriage ended in divorce when Verna Lee was still a child.

After her parents' divorce, Verna Lee and her siblings moved with her mother to Houston, Texas. Verna Lee's mother Alvirita Wells Booker was working in a Houston beauty shop when she met her second husband, who would later become Verna Lee's stepfather, Sgt. Frank "Sarge" Little, an Army officer. In 1947, Alvirita Wells moved to Japan to follow her new husband, bringing Verna Lee and her sister Vivian O'Dell Lee with her. In 1951, Vivian followed their mother and stepfather when he was reassigned to a posting in Seattle, Washington. Verna Lee would not join them.

=== Rodeo career ===
By 1949, Verna Lee returned to Texas, where she married Ted Roosevelt Hightower. After her marriage, Verna Lee Hightower raised livestock and rode horses more competitively, entering local rodeos. She quickly began to distinguish herself as a barrel-racing competitor. Moving beyond Houston rodeos, Hightower started competing on the national black rodeo circuit, successfully competing in events in California and Oklahoma. In 1969, Hightower became the first African-American woman to compete in barrel racing at the Houston Livestock Show and Rodeo. Hightower was a member of the National Colored Rodeo Association and the Girl's Rodeo Association (now the Women's Professional Rodeo Association).

Hightower would later receive a humanitarian award from the Black Heritage Committee of the Houston Livestock Show for her contributions to the rodeo. In 2007, Hightower was inducted into the National Multicultural Western Heritage Museum's Hall of Fame.

=== Personal life ===
Verna Lee and her husband Ted Hightower shared six children together. In 1963, the Hightowers won a lawsuit against the Houston Independent School District allowing their children to attend the White schools nearby their home rather than Black schools farther away.

Hightower died on August 27, 1970.
