= Bose Ikard =

American rancher (1843–1929)

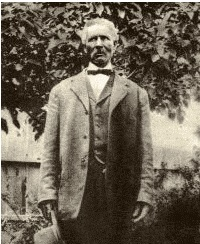
- Born: 1843; Noxubee County, Mississippi
- Died: 1929 (aged 85–86); Weatherford, Texas
- Occupation: cowboy

Bose Ikard (1843 – January 4, 1929) was an American cowboy who participated in the pioneering cattle drives on what became known as the Goodnight–Loving Trail, after the American Civil War and through 1869. Aspects of his life inspired the fictional character Joshua Deets, the African-American cowboy in Larry McMurtry's novel Lonesome Dove.

== Life and career ==
Bose Ikard was born into slavery around 1847 or in 1843 in Summerville, Noxubee County, Mississippi. He lived with his enslaver's family prior to the Civil War, becoming a ranch hand and cowboy as he grew up in Texas after the Ikards moved from Mississippi to Parker County, Texas. On the postwar cattle drives, Ikard served as a tracker and cowboy, and as Charles Goodnight's de facto banker, often carrying thousands of dollars in cash until the money could be deposited. After his last cattle drive in 1869, Ikard settled in Parker County, became a farmer, and raised a family with his wife Angeline.

== Epitaph and fictional character ==
After Ikard died on January 4, 1929, in Weatherford, Texas, Charles Goodnight paid for and erected a marker at Ikard's grave in Weatherford's Greenwood Cemetery with this epitaph:

Bose Ikard (1859–1928)
Served with me four years on the Goodnight-Loving Trail, never shirked duty or disobeyed an order, rode with me in many stampedes, participated in three engagements with Comanches, splendid behavior. C. GOODNIGHT

In June 1929, Goodnight was quoted by the Weatherford Daily Herald as saying about Ikard, "I have trusted him farther than any living man. He was my detective, banker, and everything else in Colorado, New Mexico, and the other wild country I was in." In the 2010 Plains Folk feature (heard on Prairie Public Radio) called The Grave of Oliver Loving, commentator Tom Isern mentions that Bose Ikard was a prototype for Deets. Tricia Wagner, writing in Black Cowboys of the Old West, states that Lonesome Dove, with its three characters - Woodrow Call, Gus McCrae, and Josh Deets - "was based on the adventures of Charles Goodnight and Oliver Loving and their right-hand man, Bose Ikard" and that "Danny Glover played Bose Ikard".

The epitaph for McMurtry's character of Joshua Deets was written as:

Josh Deets
Served with me 30 years, Fought in 21 Engagements with the Commanche and Kiowa. Cheerful in all weathers. Never sherked a task. Splendid behaviour.

== Honors ==
- Texas Historical Marker marking Bose Ikard's grave
- 1999 – Inducted into Hall of Great Westerners (National Cowboy & Western Heritage Museum)
- 1979 – Inducted into the Texas Trail of Fame
- 2002 – Bose Ikard Elementary School in Weatherford is named in his honor.

== See also ==
- Bill Pickett
- Isom Dart
- Nat Love
- Black cowboys
