= Goodbye Old Paint =

Cowboy folk song

Song
- Language: English
- Published: 1921
- Genre: Western, American folk
- Composer(s): Charley Willis
- Lyricist(s): Charley Willis

"Goodbye Old Paint" is a traditional Western song that was created by black cowboy Charley Willis. The song was first collected by songwriter N. Howard "Jack" Thorp in his 1921 book Songs of the Cowboys. Members of the Western Writers of America chose it as one of the Top 100 Western songs of all time.

== Authorship ==
In writing about "Goodbye Old Paint", Thorp wrote: "Heard this sung by a puncher who had been on a spree in Pecos City. He had taken a job temporarily as a sheep-rustler for an outfit in Independence Draw, down the river, and was ashamed of the job. I won't mention his name." Charley Willis, a former slave who became a cowboy and rode the Wyoming trail in the late 1800s, is now credited with authorship. Willis was in demand on cattle drives because his voice was reportedly calming to the herds.

Though folklorist John Lomax did credit Willis with the authorship of the song, Lomax never recorded a performance of the song by any black person. In spite of the somewhat-concealed history of the song, many people have been credited with writing it. In 1928, a newspaper in Amarillo, Texas reported that Texas cowboy fiddler Jess Morris had composed it. Apparently Morris' arrangement had previously caught Thorp's eye. Morris never claimed to have written the song, saying that he learned it from a black cowboy named Charley Willis. Western writer and singer Jim Bob Tinsley has said that credit for saving "Goodbye Old Paint" from being forever lost "...belongs to three Texans: a black cowboy (Willis) who sang it on cattle drives, a cowboy who remembered it (Jess Morris) and a college professor (Lomax) who put it down on paper."
