= African American trail rides =

Texas-Louisiana cultural festivals

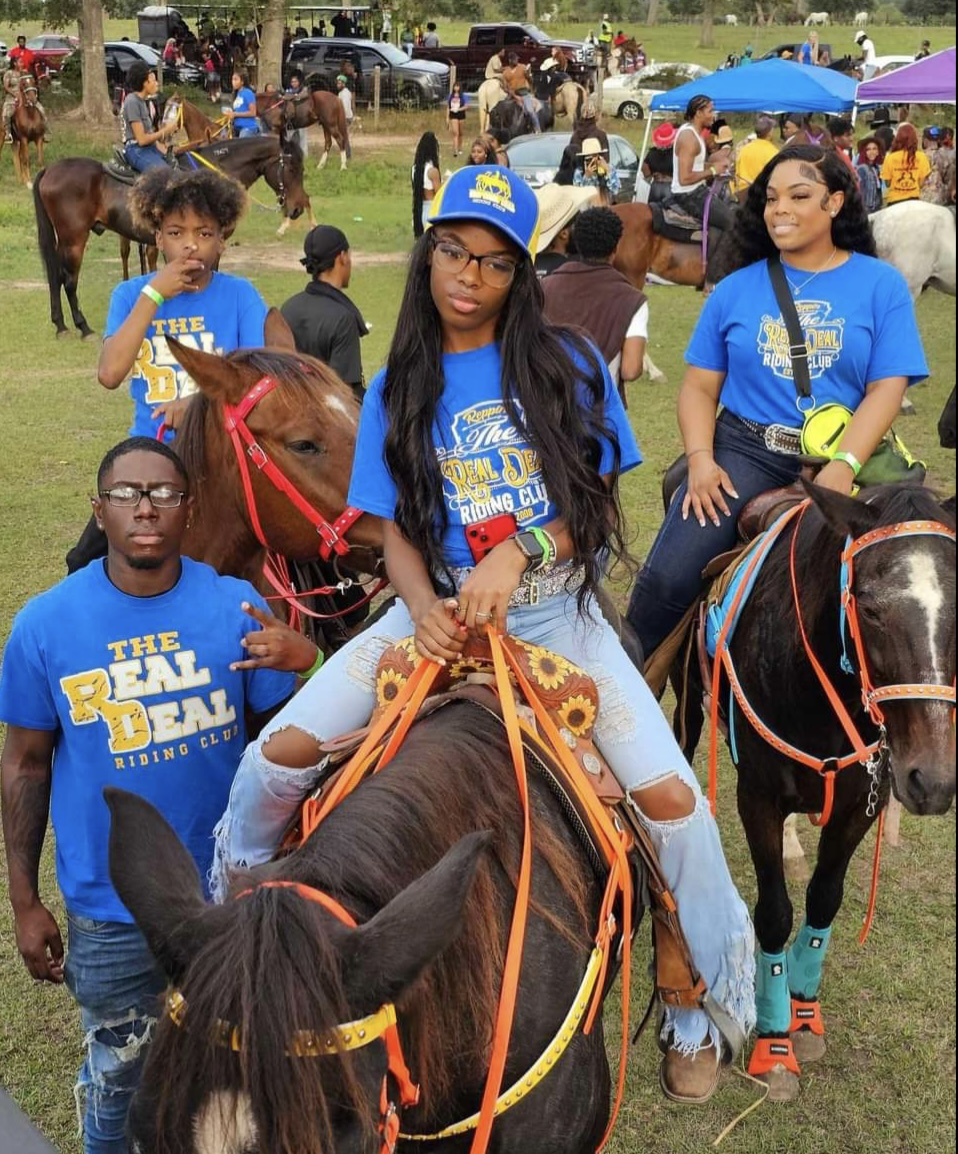
Black cowgirls and cowboys

African American trail rides, or Black trail rides, are rural parade-like celebrations that commemorate the traditions of Black cowboys and formerly enslaved Black Americans who were skilled in caring for and training livestock. The tradition is most prevalent in the African American communities of Texas, Louisiana, Arkansas, Mississippi, North Carolina, South Carolina, Georgia, and Alabama.

Creole trail rides in Louisiana and Texas typically feature a "procession, zydeco music, dancing and feasting." The annual Step-N-Strut trail ride in St. Landry Parish has been described as "the Creole Woodstock." Trail rides are increasingly popular in Mississippi.

These trail rides can include hundreds or thousands of riders, often organized by trail riding clubs.
