= Oakland Black Cowboy Association =

American nonprofit organization

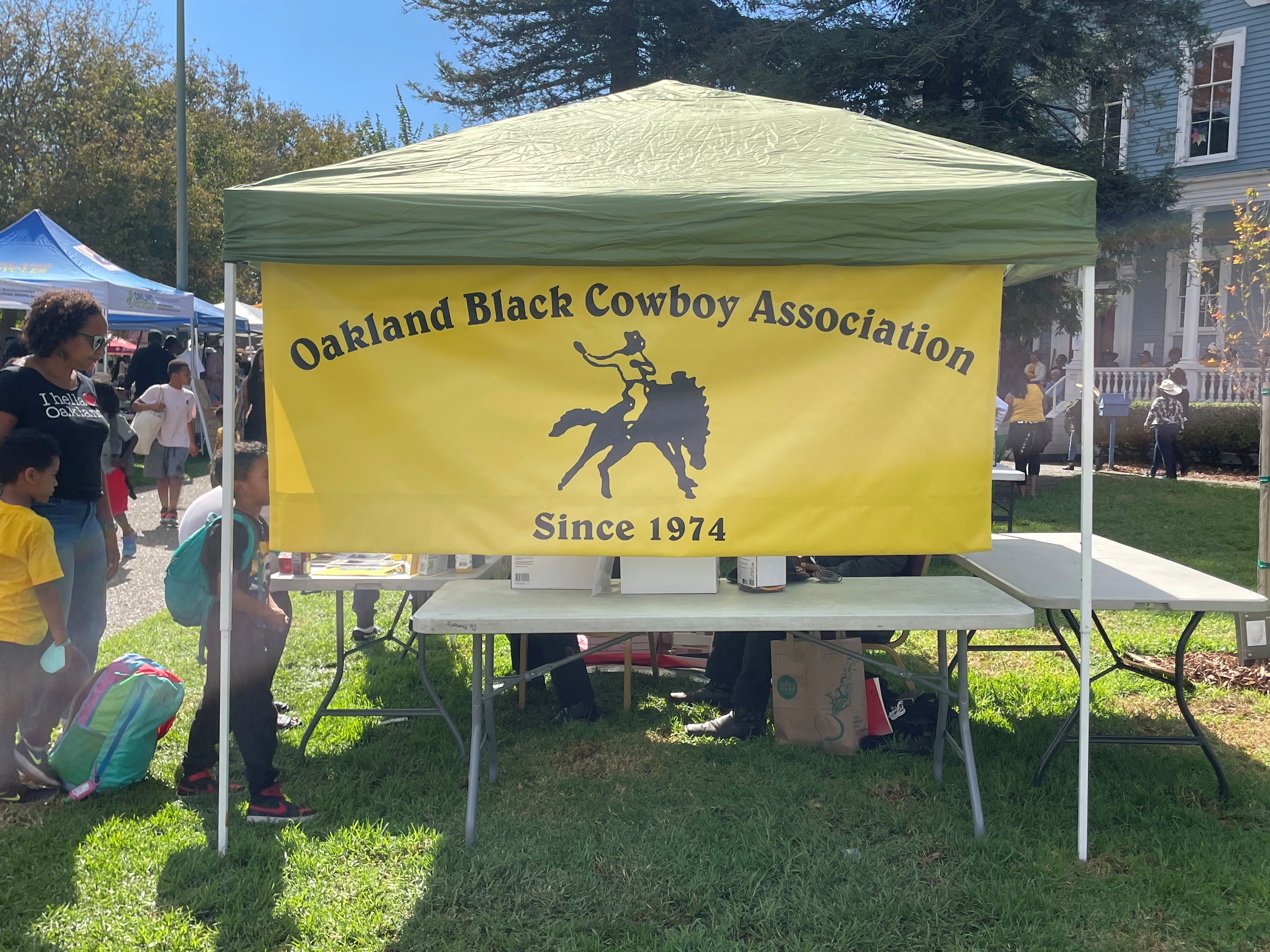
- The Oakland Black Cowboy Association booth at the Oakland Black Cowboy Parade and Festival
- Formation: 1970s
- Founder: Lonnie Scoggins/Booker Emery
- Headquarters: Oakland, California
- President: Wilbert McAlister

The Oakland Black Cowboy Association (OBCA) is a nonprofit organization based in the West Oakland neighborhood of Oakland, California, with the goal of honoring the history of Black cowboys. It holds the annual Oakland Black Cowboy Parade and Festival. It is one of several urban riding clubs in the United States that teach about Black cowboy heritage.

== History ==
In the 1960s and 70s, before the association formally organized, Booker Emery rode his horse around Oakland and gathered friends who rode with him, drawing positive attention from people on the street.

OBCA gives its inception date as 1974. The first Oakland Black Cowboy Parade was held in 1975 as part of Oakland Museum's exhibit "Blacks in the West." In 1976, OBCA was officially founded under the parent organization Blacks Unified to Motivate Progress to help plan for the next parade, along with business group Oakland Traders. OBCA's first grand marshal was former cowboy Lonnie Scoggins, who is sometimes noted as the group's founder in place of Booker Emery. The OBCA has funded and planned the parade since 1977.

== Mission and activities ==
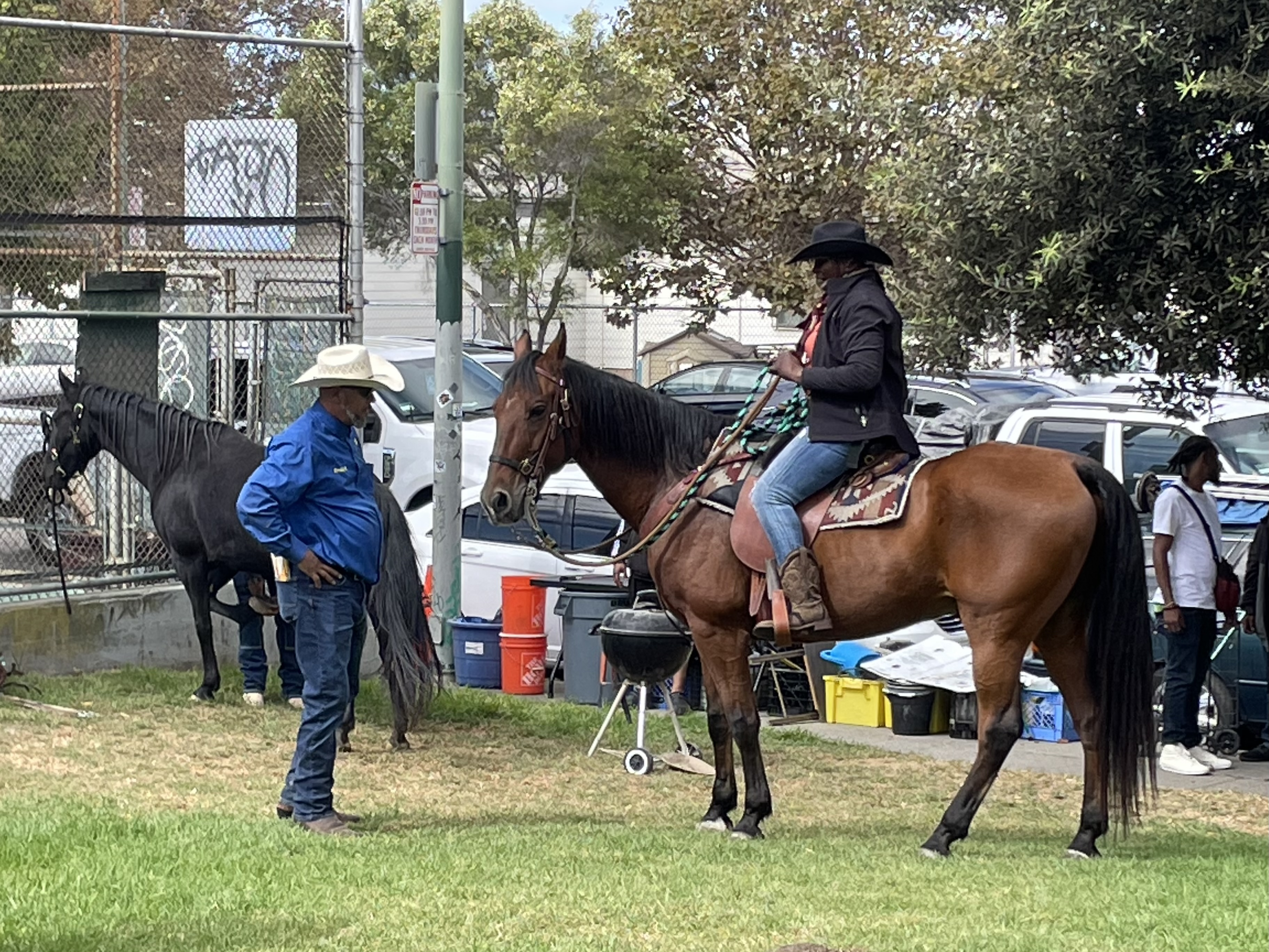
Participants in the 2022 Oakland Black Cowboy Parade and Festival

The mission of the OBCA is "educate all the citizens of Oakland and the Bay Area about the role played by Black cowboys and other pioneers in the settling of the American West." The organization also aims to help young people build confidence and community connections through learning to work with horses. Besides holding the parade and festival, the OBCA attends various community events and runs activities with Oakland's Parks, Recreation and Youth Development agency. Members of the OBCA give presentations at schools and church events. They have also participated in census outreach.

The Oakland Black Cowboy Parade and Festival is held the first weekend of October in DeFremery Park. The parade has OBCA members and young people riding horses in unison and dancing with their horses. For example, the 2018 and 2019 parades included drill teams from local high schools and colleges, square dancing groups, a Buffalo Soldiers reenactment group from Seattle, a group of Hispanic riders from San Jose, Girl Scouts, and circus groups. Some of the riders help festival attendees take short rides on their horses.

== Legacy ==
The Oakland Black Cowboy Association's records are held at the African American Museum and Library at Oakland. Ismael Reed wrote about the OBCA and parade in his book Blues City: A Walk in Oakland (2003). In 2021, James Manson and John Gamiño released a short documentary, Cowboy, about the OBCA and its longtime president Wilbert Freeman McAlister.
