= Texas Archive of the Moving Image =

Film archive in Austin, Texas

Coordinates: 30°16′N 97°44′W

The Texas Archive of the Moving Image (TAMI) is an independent 501(c)(3) organization founded in 2002 by film archivist and University of Texas at Austin professor Caroline Frick, PhD. TAMI's mission is to preserve, study, and exhibit Texas film heritage. The organization has three main projects: the TAMI Online Collection, the Texas Film Round-Up, and Teach Texas. Its offices are located in Austin, Texas at the Baker Center.

== Online collection ==
The Texas Archive of the Moving Image website is a streaming video website that includes a variety of Texas-related films such as home movies, industrial films, local television, and orphan film materials as well as TAMI-curated online exhibits. The TAMI website was launched in 2008 using Glifos Social Media and the MediaWiki platform. The oldest films in the archive are a collection of Edison Studios films from the 1900 Galveston Hurricane. The TAMI site includes several curated collections with topics that include President Lyndon B. Johnson and his family, Texas during the Vietnam War, life across Texas during the 1930s and 1940s, and itinerant films. TAMI also contains unusual material produced by Texas television stations in the latter half of the 20th century. TAMI streams multiple versions of "The Kidnappers Foil," a film added to the National Film Registry in 2012, on its website. The organization also administers a sister website, www.meltonbarker.org, devoted to the topic of The Kidnappers Foil and the itinerant Texas filmmaker Melton Barker.

=== Online exhibitions ===
TAMI curates online exhibitions featuring materials from their holdings. Exhibitions include "When Texas Saw Red," an exhibit dedicated to the post World War II and Cold War era and how it affected Texas life; "Starring the Lone Star State," which explores the history of the film industry in Texas; "A Journey to the Moon through Texas," an award-winning exhibit that documents the Apollo Program; and "La Frontera Fluida," exploring the Texas-Mexico border.

== Texas Film Round-Up ==
The Texas Film Round-Up, also known as the Texas Moving Image Archive Program, is a partnership between TAMI and the Office of the Governor’s Texas Film Commission. Via the Round-Up, TAMI provides free digitization for Texas-related films and videos in exchange for the donation of a digital copy of the material to the TAMI Video Library. Film screenings and educational exhibits about Texas media history are often part of the Round-Up activities. The Film Round-up has visited the Fort Worth, Galveston, San Angelo, Amarillo, Beaumont, Rio Grande Valley, Tyler, Lubbock, Dallas, Abilene, Longview, El Paso, Houston, Austin, and many other Texas cities since its inception in 2008.

== Teach Texas ==
Teach Texas is a resource kit for educators that includes lesson plans and other materials that enable teachers to use films from the TAMI Video Library in the K-12 classroom. The resources in the Teach Texas program are coordinated with the Texas Essential Knowledge and Skills (TEKS) standards.

== Awards ==
The Texas Film Round-Up received two awards from the American Association for State and Local History in 2010: the Leadership in History Award of Merit, and the WOW Award.
