= Anita Bush =

African American actress

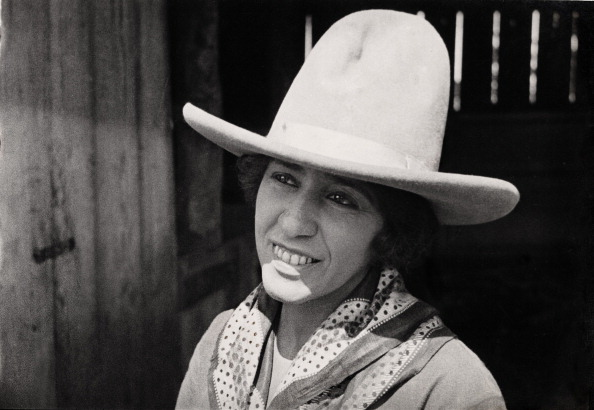
- Performing in The Crimson Skull.
- Born: September 1, 1883; Washington, DC, United States
- Died: February 16, 1974 (aged 90); Bronx, NY, United States
- Occupations: Theatre producer, Dancer, Actor
- Years active: 1899–?

Poster for The Crimson Skull (1921) with Lawrence Chenault and Anita Bush

Anita Bush (September 1, 1883 – February 16, 1974) was an African American stage actress and playwright. She founded the Anita Bush All-Colored Dramatic Stock Company in 1915, a pioneering black repertory theatre company that helped gain her the moniker "The Little Mother of Colored Drama".

== Biography ==
Anita Bush was born to Chapman Bush and Annie Elizabeth Bush, née Brown, on September 1, 1883, in Washington, DC. When she was three years old, the family moved to Brooklyn, New York, where her father, a master tailor, became “a theatrical costumer whose clients included many New York actors and performers”.

While working with her father at the Bijou Theater, she saw the renowned vaudeville company of Bert Williams and George Walker (Williams and Walker Co.), performing In Dahomey. It was during this time that she asked her father for permission to audition for the group, in hopes to gain a career in acting. At the age of 17, she was cast with the company and it allowed her to tour the world and pave a way for her to form her own companies. With the Bijou Theater Company, she “traveled to England with the musical and later performed in the Chorus of four other Williams and Walker shows”.

After performing in her final play, Mr. Lode of Koal with the troop, she formed her own dance group, Anita Bush and her 8 Shimmy Babies. Unfortunately, at the break of her career she had to stop dancing due to a back injury, which then inspired her to pursue a full-time career in theater drama.

== Career ==
In the early part of the 20th century, Bush worked extensively as a dancer in musical theatre and vaudeville performing with the likes of Williams and Walker Co. While working with Maria C. Downs she put on vaudeville acts and plays. With a signed contract with Elmore, Bush went to Billie Burke, a Harlem-based white director/playwright to stage his play, The Girl at the Fort, a light comedy with five characters. Bush then assembled the cast which included Carlotta Freeman, Dooley Wilson and Andrew S. Bishop. The play opened at the Lincoln Theatre in November 1915. For the next six weeks, Bush's company presented a different play every two weeks to much success.

The success of Downs's and Bush's team allowed them to generate more revenue and popularity. At this point, Downs asked Bush to change the name of her company from the Anita Bush Stock Company to the Lincoln Players. Bush's response to the request was, “…[she] moved her company to the Lafayette Theater to open with a sketch, Over the Footlights”.

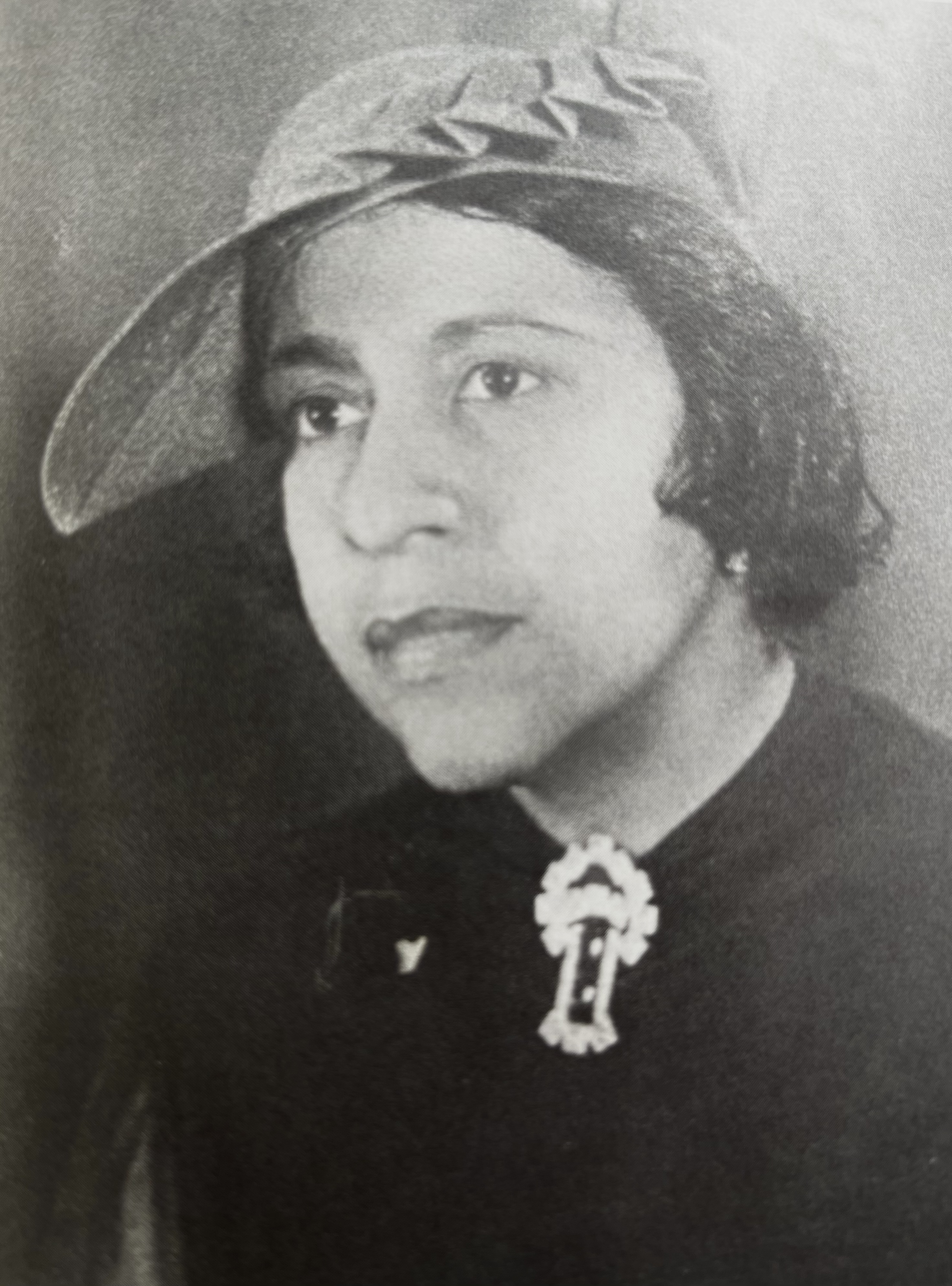
Anita Bush, c. 1937

=== The Lafayette Players ===
Bush founded The Anita Bush Stock Company in 1915 after presenting the idea of launching a dramatic stock company to Eugene "Frenchy" Elmore, the assistant manager of the Lincoln Theatre, an established vaudeville house in the Harlem section of New York City. Although her company had not yet been established, she convinced Elmore that she could mount a production in just two weeks. In March 1916, the Lafayette Theatre purchased the rights to her company and changed its name to The Lafayette Players. Bush then organized four additional companies of the Lafayette Players which toured throughout the United States.

At the Lafayette Theatre, Bush's company would mount a new play every week. Throughout the Lafayette Players lifetime with Bush, she reached a point where she could no longer afford the group and sold her right to her “co-manager”. Lester Walton. Even though she no longer managed the Players, Bush is credited with its founding and with establishing its reputation for excellence and for launching the careers of Charles Gilpin, Dooley Wilson, Evelyn Preer and others.. She faithfully remained with the company until 1920, when she left to pursue a career in film.

=== Silent films ===
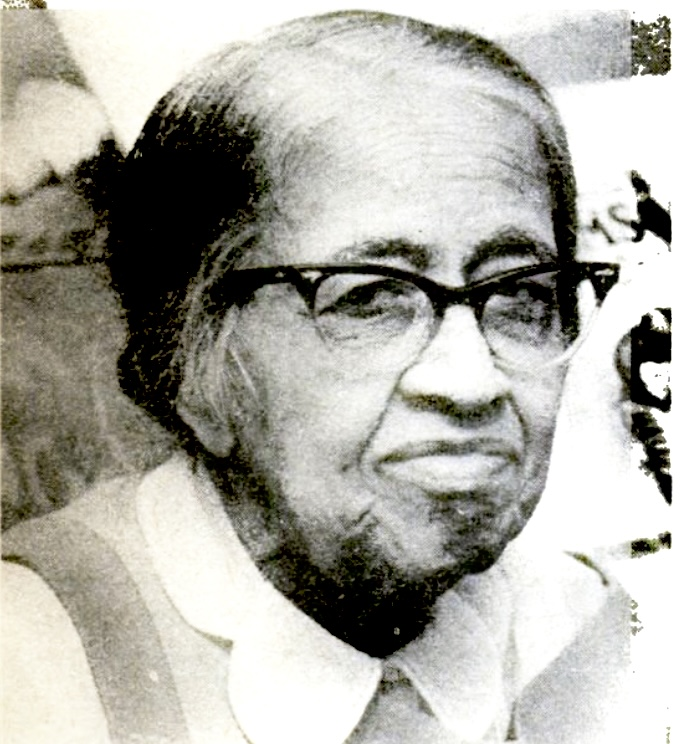
Anita Bush at home, c. 1970

Bush was approached in 1921 by Richard E. Norman, a white filmmaker whose Norman Studios (also known as the Norman Film Manufacturing Company) was among the first companies to produce “race films”—films with positive, family-friendly storylines starring African American characters in positive, non-stereotypical roles. Bush appeared in The Bull-Dogger (1921), starring renowned Black rodeo cowboy Bill Pickett and starred in The Crimson Skull (1922) with vaudeville performer Lawrence Chenault, also with Pickett.

== Death ==
Anita Bush died at the age of 90 in her Bronx, New York home on February 16, 1974.

== Known works ==
=== Stage ===
- In Dahomey, 1903
- Antony and Cleopatra, 1914
- Across the Footlights, 1915
- Within the Law, 1915-1916
- The Octoroon or Life in Louisiana, 1916
- Madame X, 1916-1917
- Very Good Eddie, 1917-1918
- Goethe’s Faust, 1917-1918

=== Film ===
- The Bull-Dogger, 1921
- The Crimson Skull, 1922
