= When True Love Wins =

- Directed by: Isaac Fisher
- Production company: Southern Motion Picture Co.
- Release date: 1915
- Country: United States

When True Love Wins is a 1915 American film. It was produced by Birmingham, Alabama based Southern Motion Picture Company and adapted from Isaac Fisher's screenplay about prejudice based on pigmentation.

The New York Age reported that it showed to packed audiences at the Champion Theater in Birmingham. The Atlanta Independent described the film as having a skillfully constructed story that featured a happy ending and good moral.

Fisher also wrote "The Man Who Could Turn White", a story adapted to film in 1921 as The Green-Eyed Monster.
