= The Crimson Skull =

1922 film

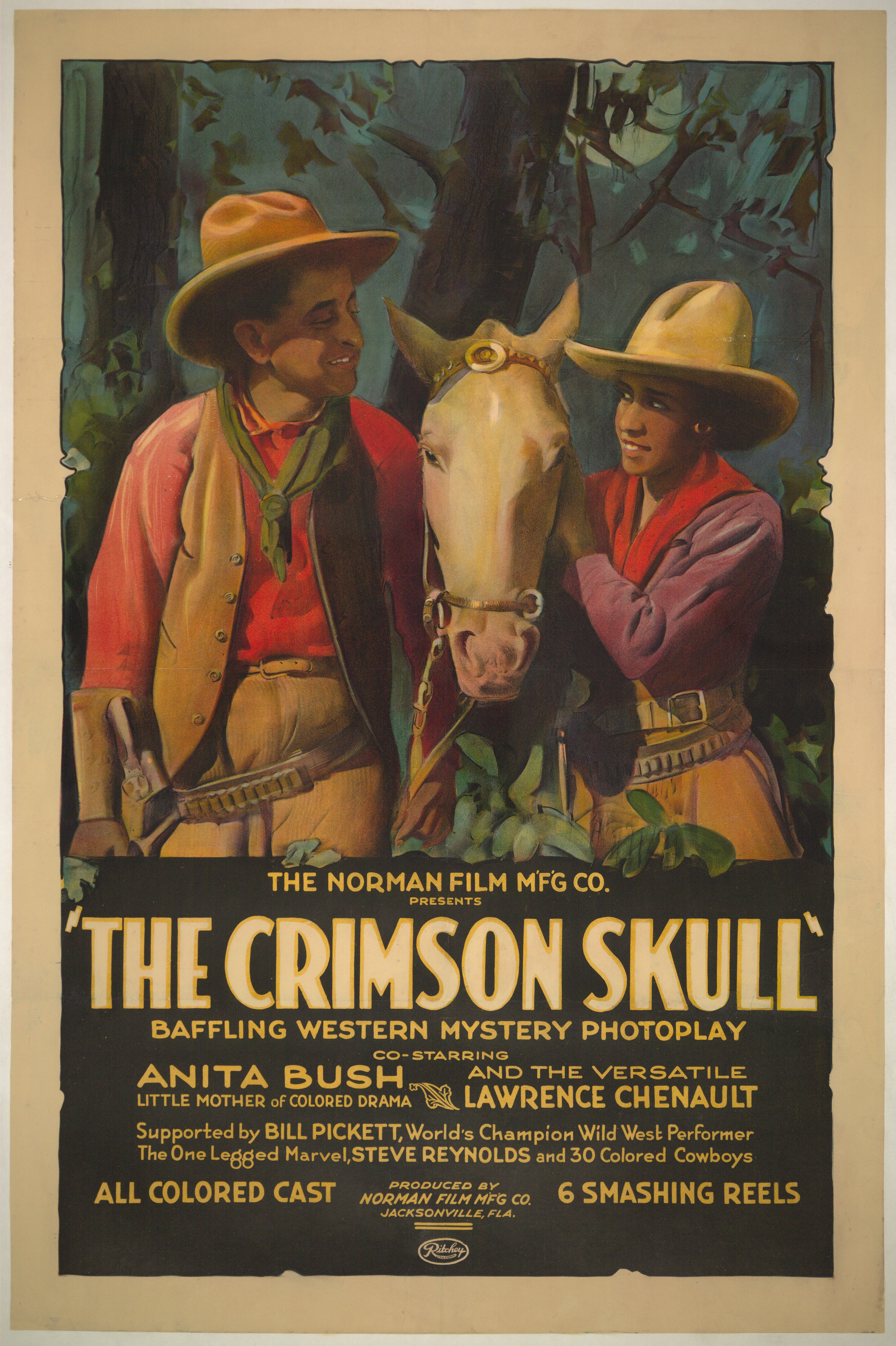
- Film Poster
- Produced by: Richard Norman
- Starring: Anita Bush; Lawrence Chenault; Bill Pickett; Steve Reynolds
- Production company: Norman MFG Film Co.
- Release date: January 1922
- Running time: 6 reels
- Country: United States
- Language: Silent (English intertitles)

The Crimson Skull is a 1922 American silent Western mystery film that was produced by the Norman Film Manufacturing Company. The six-reel film was made on location in Boley, Oklahoma and was made along with The Bull-Dogger, which its release followed. Local cowboys appear in the film backing up the actors and professional rodeo performer Bill Pickett. It was marketed as a "Baffling Western Mystery Photo-play". The film is considered lost. Press books for the film remain in existence.

== Cast ==
- Anita Bush
- Lawrence Chenault
- Bill Pickett
- Steve "Peg" Reynolds

== Images ==
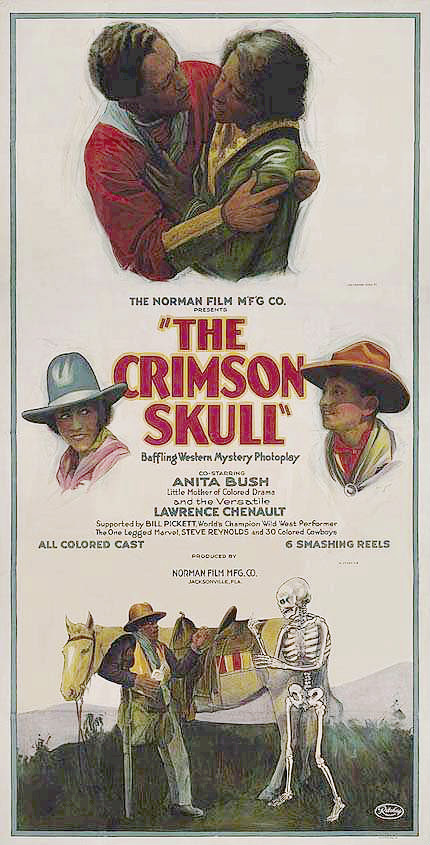
Poster

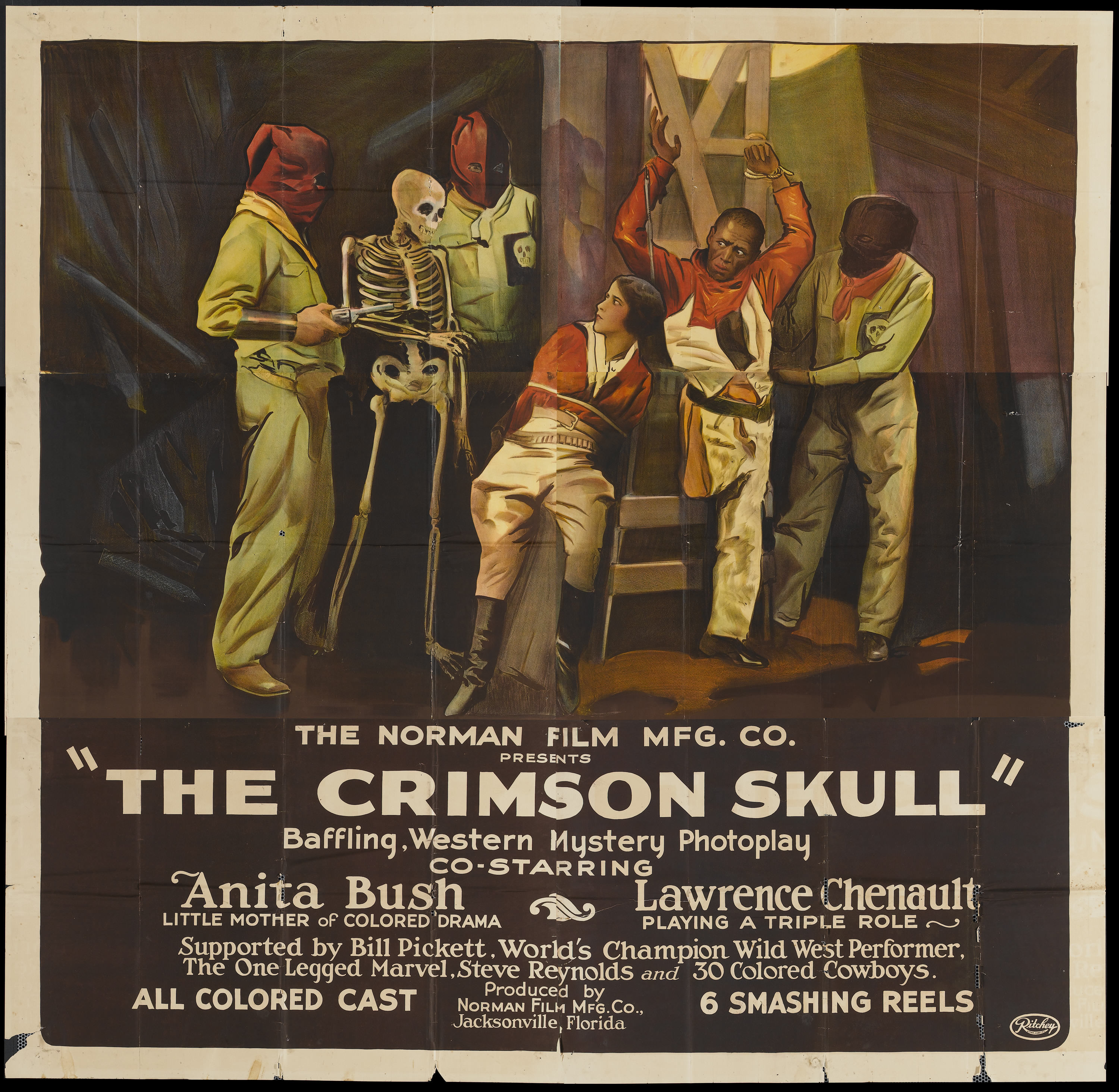
Poster

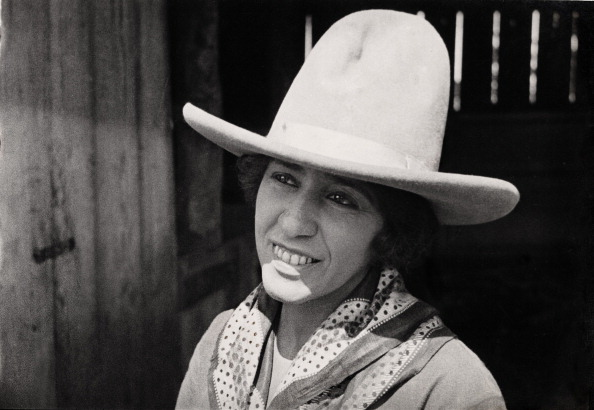
Still of Anita Bush

Advertisement for the film.
