= The Kidnappers Foil =

Series of American community films by Melton Barker

The Kidnappers Foil is the name of several American short films, made by Melton Barker between the 1930s and 1970s. Each iteration featured small-town children as actors (a different small town in each version), the parents of whom paid Barker a fee in exchange for appearing in the film.

Although the film was made dozens, perhaps hundreds, of times, only a few versions survive. The Texas Archive of the Moving Image holds a collection of these itinerant films and hosts Internet resources for those who appeared in them as children. In 2012, the surviving versions were selected as a group for preservation in the National Film Registry by Library of Congress, being deemed "culturally, historically, or aesthetically significant".

== Plot ==
In the plot of the films, a young girl is kidnapped from her birthday party and rescued by a search party of local kids. The relieved neighbors celebrated with a party where youngsters would display their musical talents. A few weeks after filming, the town would screen the 15- to 20-minute picture to the delight of the local audience.
