= Kathryn Boyd =

American silent film actress

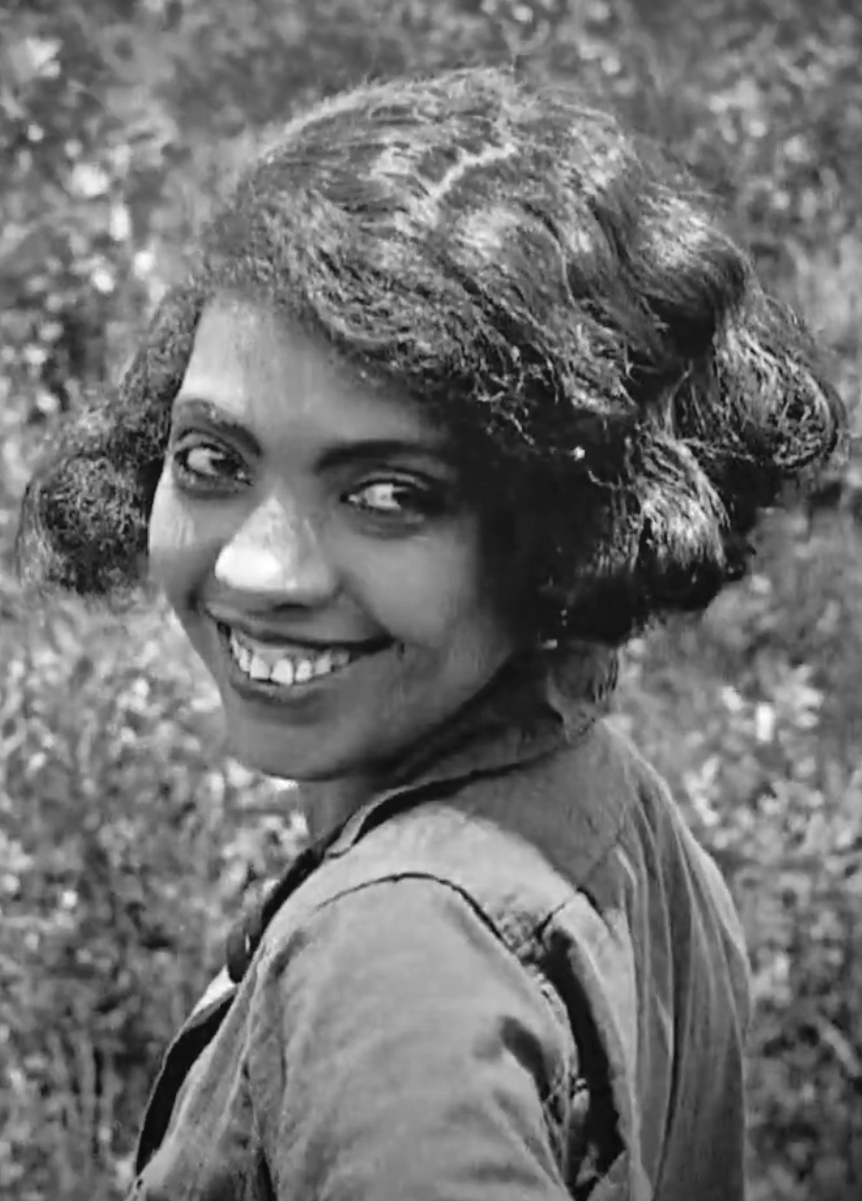
- Boyd in The Flying Ace (1926)
- Born: September 13, 1897; San Antonio, Texas, US
- Died: March 16, 1965 (aged 67); Cleveland, Ohio, US
- Occupation: Actor
- Relatives: R.H. Boyd (Grandfather)

Kathryn Althea “Katie” Boyd (1897–1965) was an American actress who appeared in several black films, including a starring in role in the 1926 The Flying Ace, one of the few films of that genre to survive.

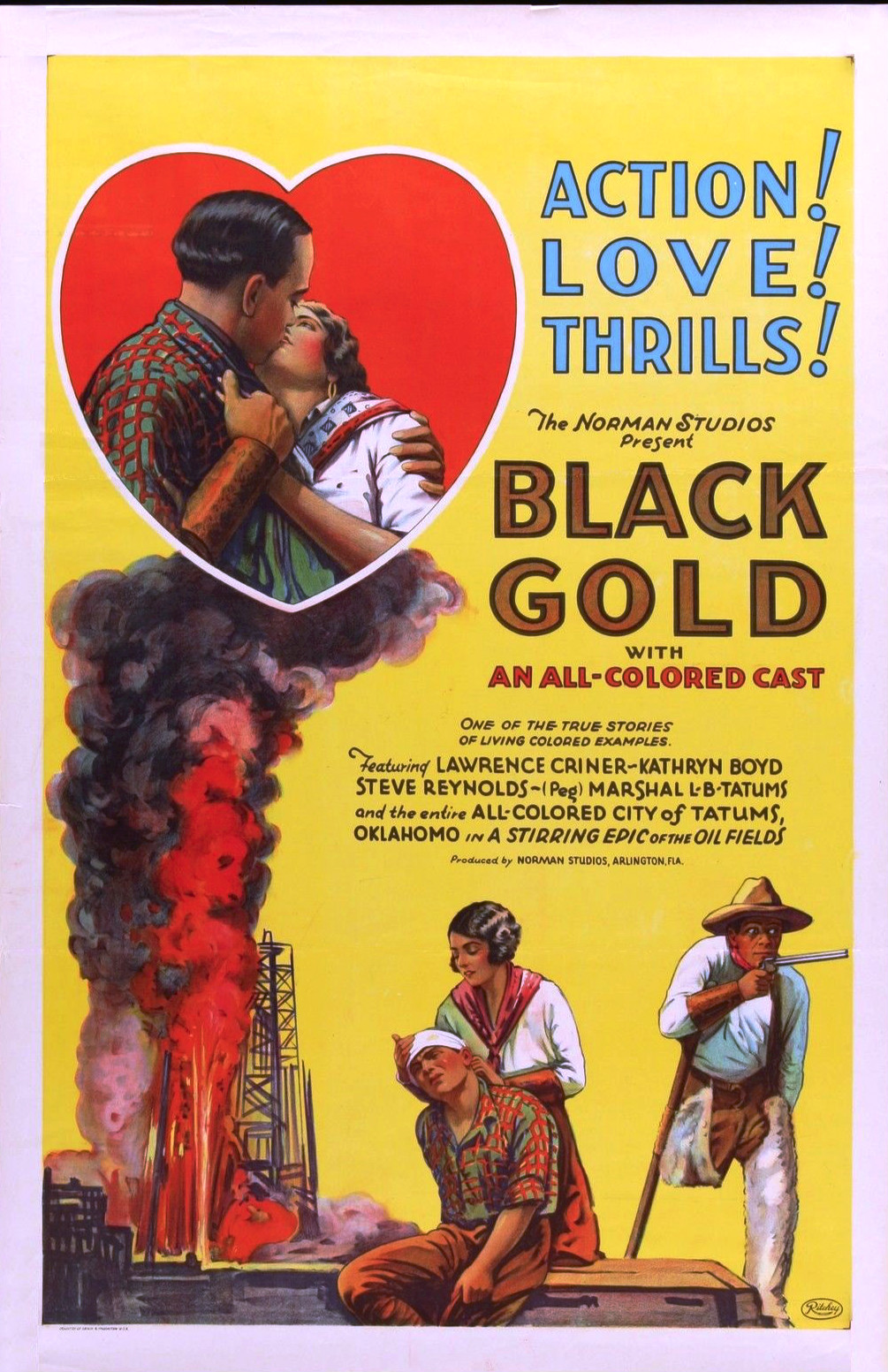
Poster for ‘’Black Gold’’ featuring Ms. Boyd

== Early life ==
Kathryn Boyd was born on September 13, 1897 in San Antonio, Texas. Her parents were Henry Allen Boyd and Georgia Anna Bradford Boyd. Her father was a son of R. H. Boyd. She studied at Fisk College in Nashville and at Oberlin College in Oberlin, Ohio.

In 1910 she went with her father to Tokyo, Japan to attend the World Sunday School Congress. She also worked on the National Baptist Congress Model Sunday School program.

== Show business career ==
Her first husband, Irvin C. Miller, produced variety shows, and she worked with him, including as a stage manager. In 1925, her three year old son, Irvin C. Miller, Jr., died of diphtheria and Kathryn began performing herself, saying that “she must keep busy.” She joined Lawrence Criner in the Lafayette Players and costarred with him in The Flying Ace.

== Post acting ==
Boyd stopped acting when she married Milton M. Cloud, a Los Angeles physician. After his death in 1931, she married a Baptist minister in Cleveland, Ohio, the Rev. Abraham L. Roach.

Kathryn Boyd died on March 16, 1965, in Cleveland, and is buried at Evergreen Memorial Park Cemetery, Bedford Heights, Ohio.

== Filmography ==
- Deceit (1923)
- The Flying Ace (1926).
- Black Gold (1928)
