= Don O. Newland =

American film director

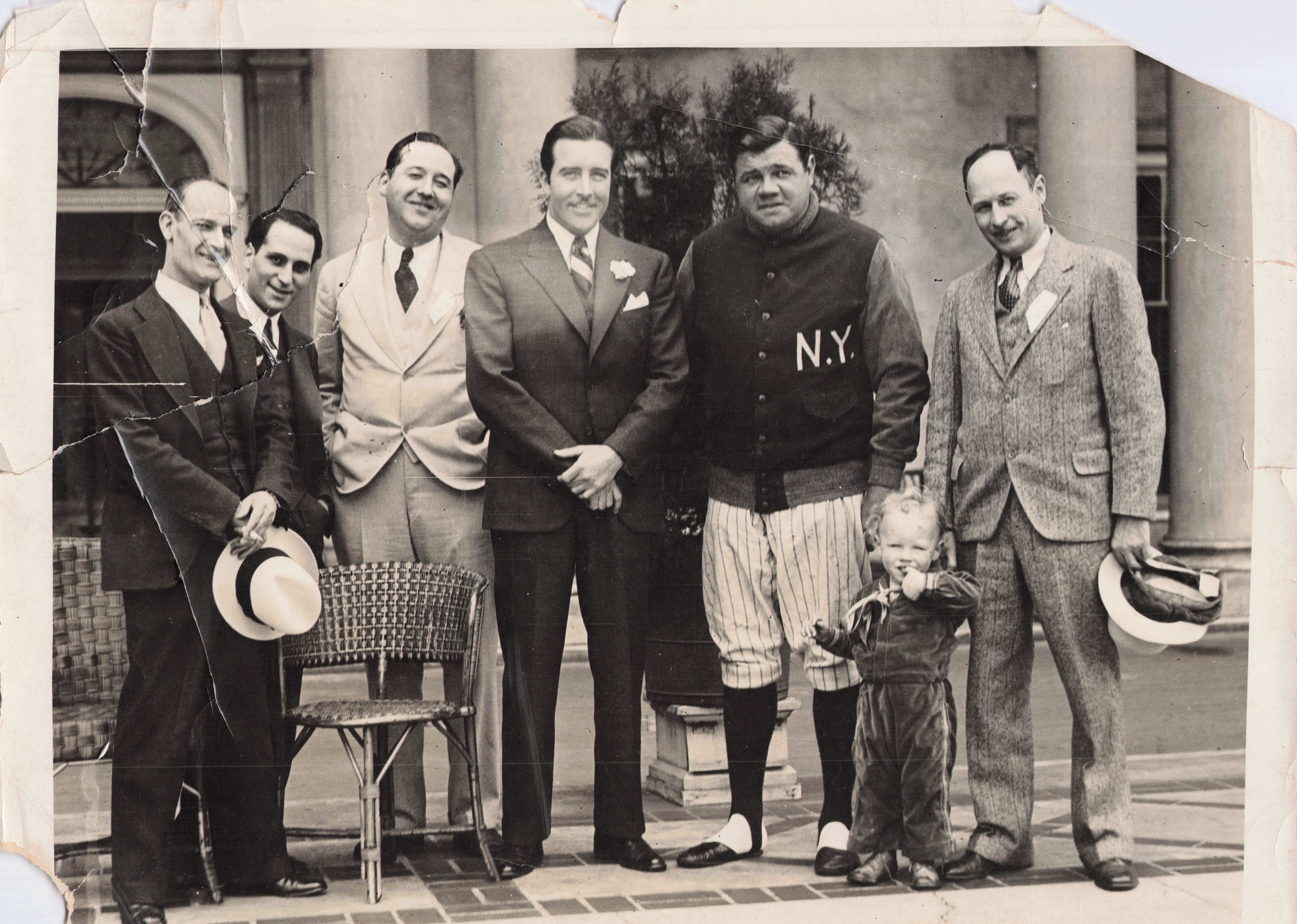

Don Oliver Newland (1896–1951) was an American film director and producer whose career consisted largely of itinerant work. From the 1920s until his death, he traveled to cities throughout the United States making films that employed local citizens as stars and extras. Using a standard script, Newland personalized each film according to its location – Belvidere's Hero, Staunton's Hero, Janesville's Hero, Huntingdon's Hero, Tyrone's Hero, Wilmington's Hero, Portsmouth’s Hero, and so on.

Newland was born June 8, 1896, in Battle Creek, Michigan, the son of Dr. J.S. Newland and the former Josephine Roche. He enlisted in the United States Army on August 28, 1918, in Chicago, Illinois and was assigned to 4th Company, Development Battalion Number 1. He spent less than five months in the military, being discharged at Camp Wadsworth, South Carolina, on January 9, 1919, as part of the country's general demobilization after World War I.

== Film work ==
While records indicating precisely when Newland entered film production have not surfaced, newspaper publicity for his Hero films credited him with producing one-reelers with Mary Pickford, James Kirkwood, Flora Finch and John Bunny. Since Bunny died in 1915, Newland would have started in films while still a teenager. He also was credited with directing comedies for Mack Sennett.

In the early 1920s, Newland began the frenetic itinerant work that would take him all over the United States capturing communities and their citizens in two-reeler comedies that used the same simple, customizable plot. Operating as the Consolidated Film Producing Co. of Los Angeles, California, he was generally commissioned by local newspapers to produce the films, which always contained the role of a reporter and a prominent look at how the local newspaper was produced – although the papers often stressed that the project was not an advertising film. Contests were frequently held in each community to determine who the "leading lady" would be.

Filming usually took place in no more than three days, with Newland directing a cameraman and one or two crew members. A standard bit of action was to stage a head-on car crash on a city street using "trick photography;" two cars would be placed bumper to bumper and a smoke bomb released under the radiators. The cars would then be backed away from each other and the film, when developed and reversed, would appear to show a head-on collision.

Developing and editing took another couple of days, and within a week of Newland's arrival in town, the Hero film would be shown to the community at a local movie theater. When sound pictures became the standard after 1929, Newland adjusted to meet the technological advance.

It is believed that only one print of each of his films was made. Some have survived and enjoyed revivals in the communities in which they were shot.

Currently only four of these "Hero" films are known to exist. These films are Janesville's Hero (1926), Belvidere's Hero (1926), Huntingdon's Hero (April 1934), and Tyrone's Hero (May 1934). With Towanda's Queen, a total of five Newland films survive.

== Personal life ==
Newland never made a great deal of money with his itinerant film work and occasionally would give it up to pursue more mainstream employments. In a 2005 newspaper interview, his daughter, Helen Newland, noted: "My father absolutely loved film-making. It was his passion and he threw himself into it with everything he had. He wasn’t much of a businessman – he really didn’t care anything about money –he just wanted to move about in his creative world."

In 1951, Newland traveled with his wife, Opal, and children, Helen & Donna, to Tampa, Florida for the winter. On May 5, while driving in Tampa, he swerved to miss another car and crashed. Newland was rushed to the hospital with severe spinal cord injuries. Newland died May 7 and his body was removed to South Bend, Indiana, where relatives lived. He was buried there in Riverview Cemetery on May 11.
