= Norman Studios =

Early 20th century American film studio

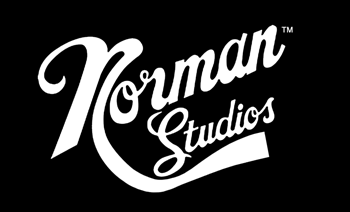
- Established: 1920
- Location: Arlington, Jacksonville, Florida, United States
- Type: Film
- Website: normanstudios.org
- Norman Film Studios
- U.S. National Register of Historic Places
- U.S. National Historic Landmark
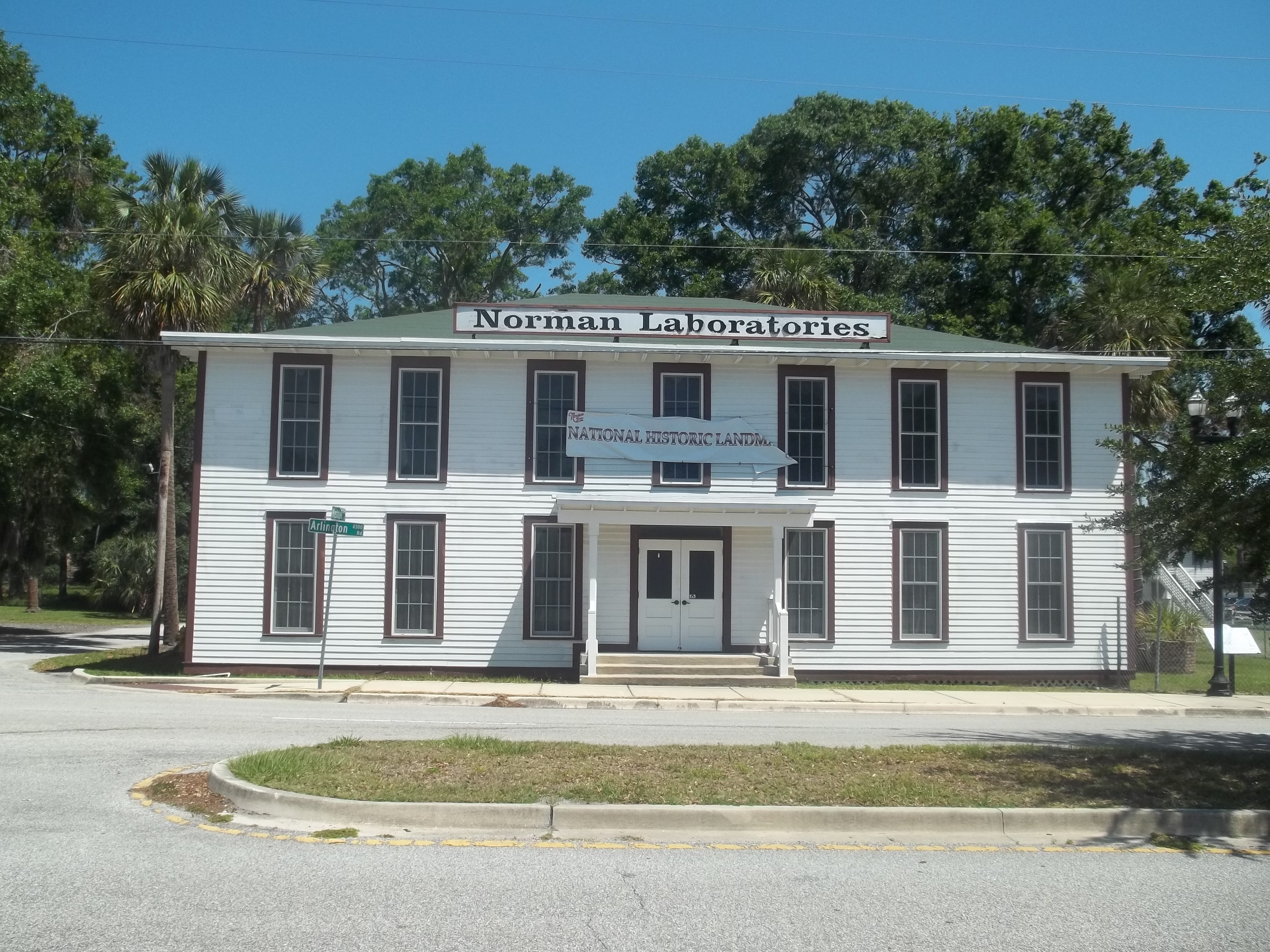
- Restored facility in Jacksonville

- Location within Florida Location within the United States
- Location: Jacksonville, Florida
- Coordinates: 30.33379°N 81.59365°W
- NRHP reference No.: 14001084, 16000857

Significant dates
- Added to NRHP: December 29, 2014
- Designated NHL: October 31, 2016

Norman Studios, also known as Norman Film Manufacturing Company, is a former American film studio in Jacksonville, Florida. Founded by Richard Edward Norman, the studio produced silent films featuring African-American casts from 1919 to 1928. The only surviving studio from the period of early filmmaking in Jacksonville, its facilities are now the Norman Studios Silent Film Museum.

One of the most prominent studios creating films for Black audiences in the silent era, Norman's films featured all-Black casts with protagonists in positive roles. These were part of the genre of race films. During its run it produced eight feature length films and numerous shorts; its only surviving film, The Flying Ace, has been restored by the Library of Congress. The studio transitioned to distribution and promotion after the rise of talking pictures made its technology obsolete, and eventually closed. In the 21st century, the studio's facilities were restored and re-purposed as a museum.

On October 31, 2016, the location was designated a National Historic Landmark.

== History ==
=== Early history ===
During the early 20th century, the emerging film industry that was traditionally located in New York built a new home in Northeast Florida so they could continue filming during the winter. Jacksonville, home to over thirty silent film studios from 1908 to 1922, became known as the "Winter Film Capital of the World". Eagle Film Studios, which would later become Norman Studios, was built in 1916. The five buildings composing the studio went bankrupt in the following years.

=== Richard Norman ===
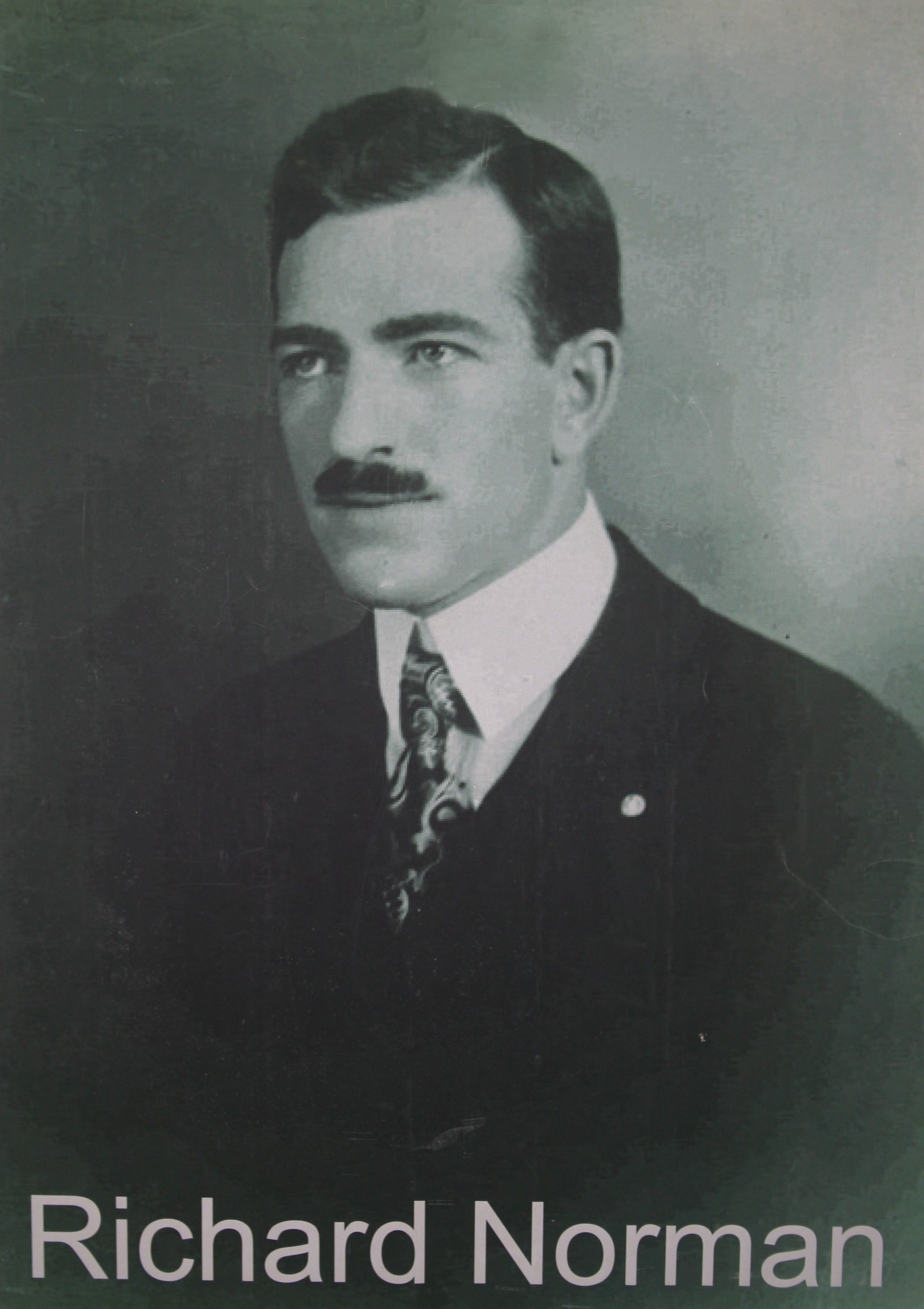
Richard E. Norman

Born in Middleburg, Florida in 1891, Richard Edward Norman started his film career in the Midwest making movies for white audiences in the 1910s. His early work was a series of "home talent" films, in which he would travel to various towns with stock footage and a basic script; after recruiting local celebrities for minor roles, they would film a small portion of footage (approximately 200 feet of new material) over the course 40 of a few days. These films included The Wrecker and Sleepy Sam the Sleuth, and after they were processed at Norman's laboratory in Chicago, they would be screened and any funds raised would be split between Norman and the town. This led to his filming other events and productions throughout the Midwest, including the play "Pro Patria" at the University of Illinois Urbana-Champaign. His first silent film with an all Black cast was The Green-Eyed Monster (1919), adapted from his earlier home talent film The Wrecker set in the railroad industry, The expanded film included a dramatic story of greed and jealousy with a comedic subplot, and drew on many early racial stereotypes. This initial version of the film received widely mixed reviews. Norman decided to split the film into a drama and a comedy, Green-Eyed Monster and Love Bug, respectively, and the films did significantly better. Norman moved to Jacksonville during the height of the film industry and bought the studio in 1920 at the age of 29. It may be that Norman occupied the studios before purchasing them. The success of the film brought attention to the studio from other African-American actors hoping to star in later films.

=== Race films ===
During the time, films with an African-American cast and shown specifically to African-American audiences were known as "race films". Norman Studios produced several of these films during the 1920s. Richard Norman's reason to produce race films was not solely a business decision. Although the studio was indeed filling a niche, Norman was also motivated by the state of race relations at the time. The untapped Black filmgoer market and the plethora of talented performers unable to get work in mainstream films lead to the production of race films by Norman Studios.

Films produced by Norman Studios include: Green-Eyed Monster (1919), a railroad drama; The Love Bug (1919), a comedy; The Bull-Dogger (1921), a western; The Crimson Skull (1922), another western; Regeneration (1923), an action adventure set on an island after a shipwreck; The Flying Ace (1926), Norman's most famous film; and Black Gold (1928), a drama set around the oil business.

==== The Bull Dogger (1921) ====
The Bull-Dogger was Norman's first Western film. Like many of his contemporaries, including Oscar Micheaux, Norman saw the West as the next film frontier. This was especially important for films featuring Black actors, as the West was seen as a land of opportunity free from segregation and oppression. Shot in Boley, Oklahoma (a town billed as an exclusively Black town), The Bull Dogger features cowboy Bill Pickett, Anita Bush, and Norman's favorite one-legged actor, Steve "Peg" Reynolds. The plot is thin, and the storyline is secondary to the action and adventure of the Black cowboys.

==== The Crimson Skull (1922) ====
Although Norman had planned to film three Westerns, he only produced two. The Crimson Skull was filmed at the same time as The Bull Dogger, and again features Pickett, Bush, and Peg. Edited, produced, and released in 1922, The Crimson Skull tells the story of a town beset by bandits, led by the infamous 'Skull' (an actor in a skeleton costume). Bob, the ranch hand, must rescue the ranch owner's daughter, Anita (played by Bush), and Peg from the clutches of the outlaws. After Bob infiltrates the gang to free them both, he must stand trial via "The Crimson Skull," wherein dripping blood reveals his fate. The bandits are captured and Bob is rewarded with both a financial reward and the hand of Anita.

==== Regeneration (1923) ====
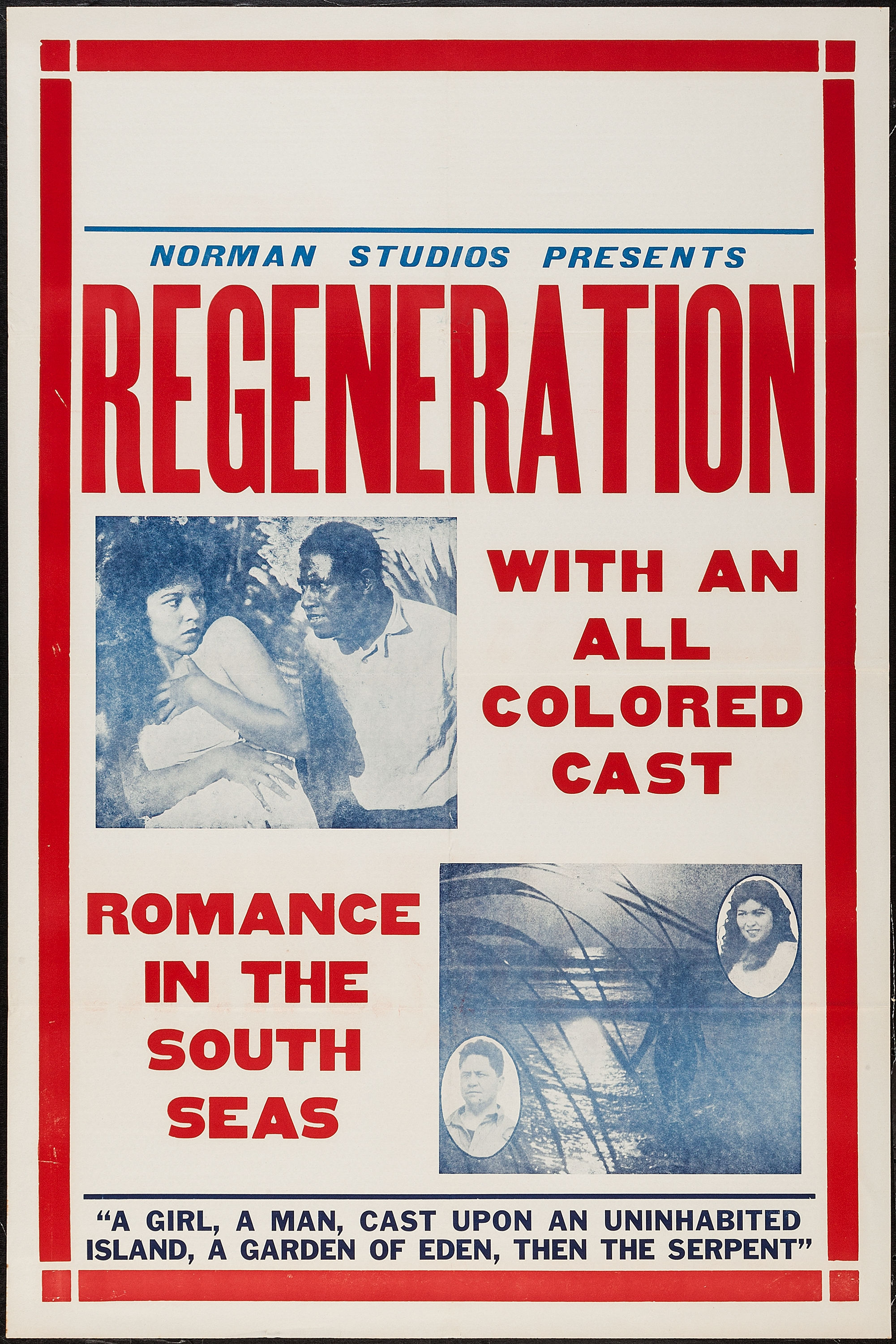
Advertisement for Regeneration

Norman turned to the seas and created Regeneration with Violet Daniels (Stella Mayo) as the orphaned, only child of a widowed sea captain. Jack Roper (M.C. Maxwell), the owner of the Anna Belle fishing schooner and first mate to Violet's father, sets sail with Violet, following a mysterious map for their course. After the pair are forced from the ship and stranded on an island, which they name 'Regeneration,' the pair live out a Robinson Crusoe-esque story, where they best their enemy, find buried treasure, and are safely rescued.

This film was an instant hit that benefited from Norman's unique promotional methods. In particular, Norman encouraged theaters to fill their lobbies with sand to draw potential customers in.

==== The Flying Ace (1926) ====
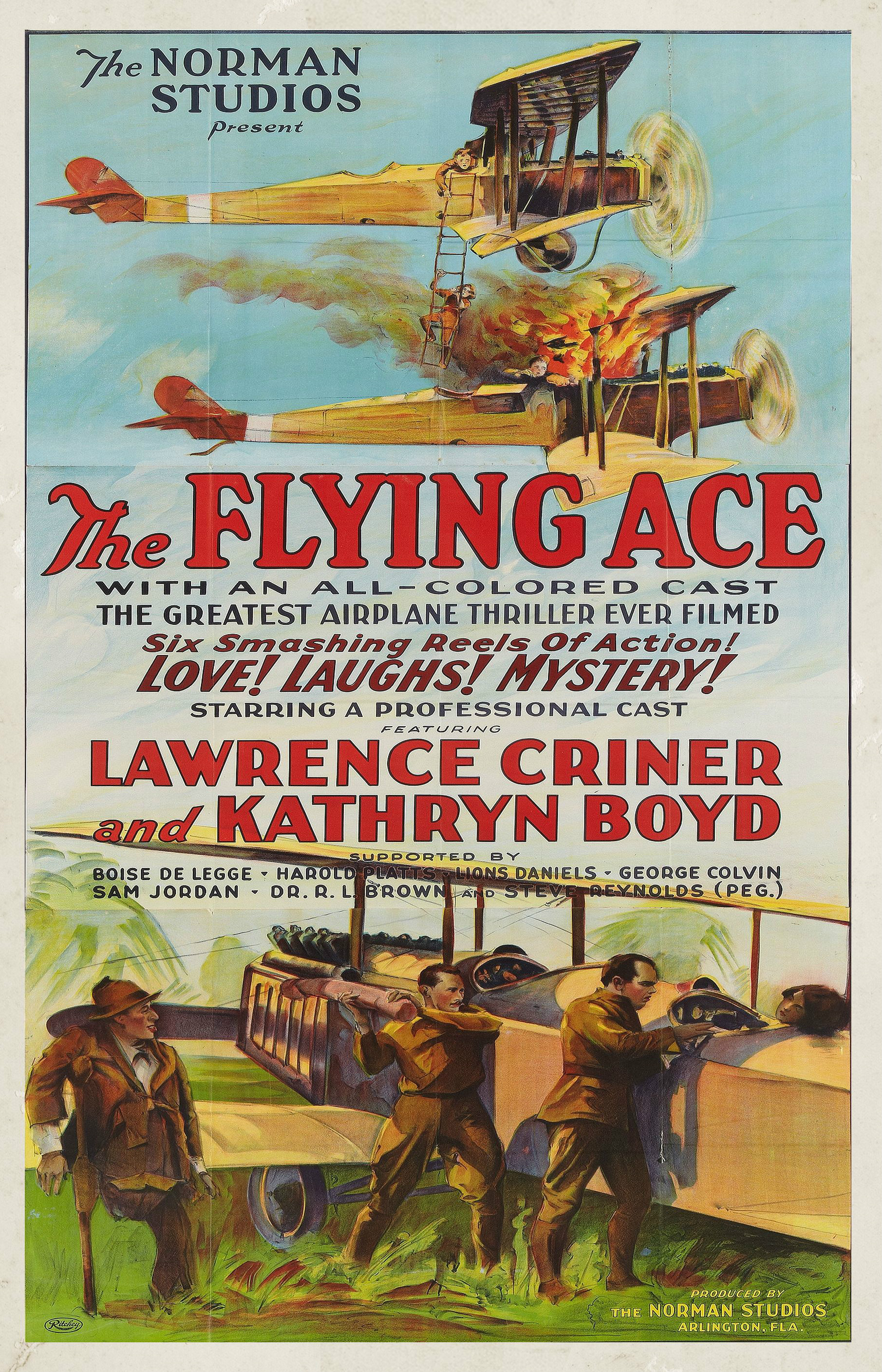
Norman Studios poster for The Flying Ace (1926)

The only film from Norman Studios to be restored and kept in the Library of Congress, The Flying Ace was dubbed "the greatest airplane thriller ever filmed." It was filmed entirely on the ground, but used camera tricks to imply movement and altitude for the stationary airplanes. The film was inspired by aviators like Bessie Coleman who sent a letter to Norman Studios expressing a wish to create a film based on her life.

The plot of the film revolves around a former World War I fighter pilot returning home. He is rehired to his previous job as a railroad company detective to solve a new case involving stolen payroll money and a missing employee. The film is the only one from the period known to have survived. The Library of Congress keeps a copy of the film as it is deemed culturally significant. Nowadays, The Flying Ace is screened occasionally across the nation.

Norman constructed a prop plane for the film. Creative use of the camera produced the upside down flying sequences. African Americans were not allowed to serve as pilots in the United States armed forces at the time.

==== Black Gold (1928) ====
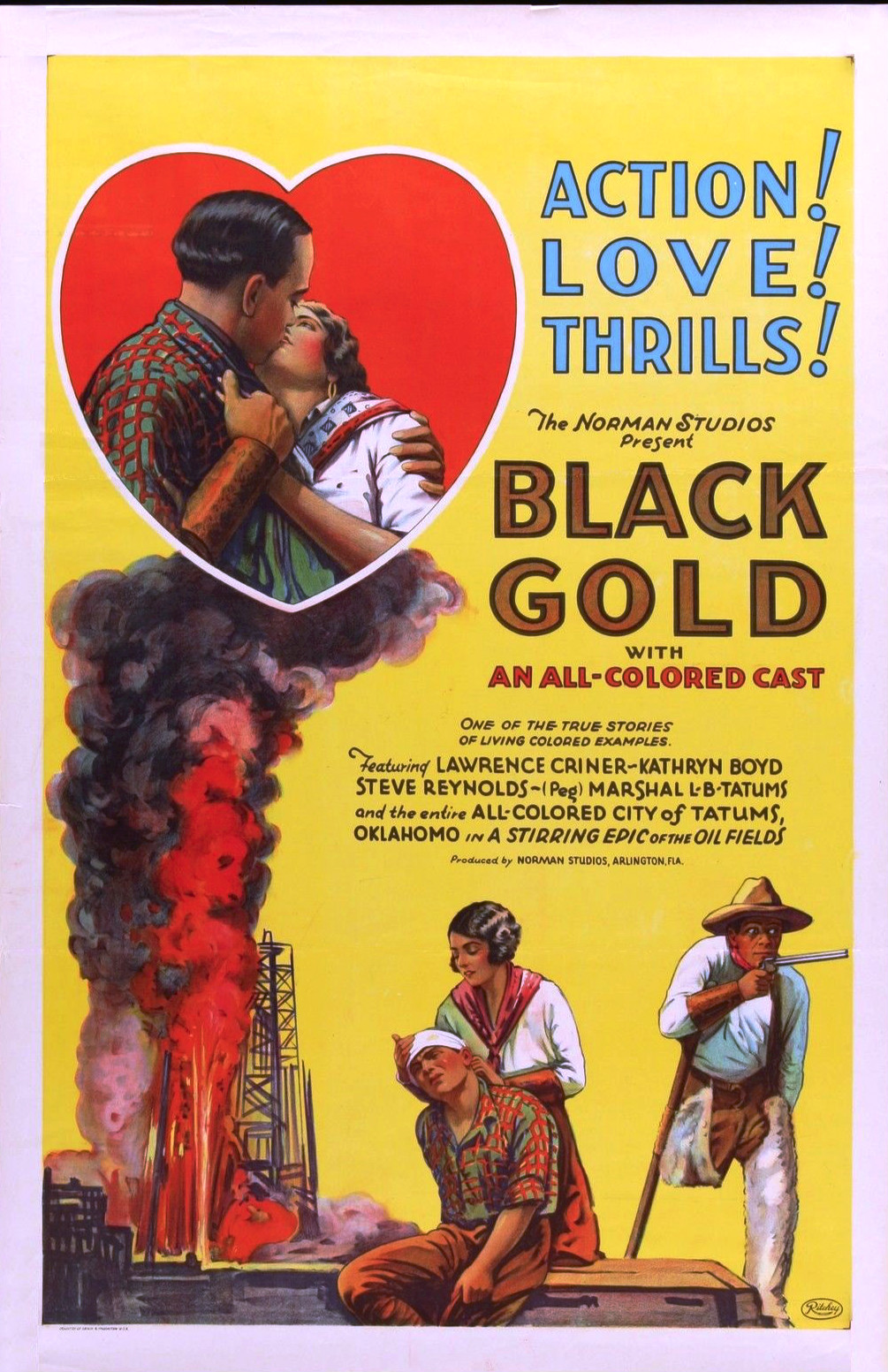
Poster for Black Gold (1928 film)

Norman's last feature film, Black Gold, is about oil drilling in the American West based on the story of John Crisp, a Black leaseholder who found oil on his Oklahoma property. In the film, Mart Ashton, a rancher, looks to invest in oil wells on his property. His driller secretly conspires with the Ohio Company to take over his well. When Ashton is framed for robbery and thrown into jail, his foreman, Ace, and the bank president's daughter, Alice, team up with Peg to exonerate Ashton. When they are successful, Ace and Alice start their future together.

The plot involves the discovery of oil on the Oklahoma range on property near the town of Tatums. The owner of the Bar Circle ranch, Mart Ashton (Alfred Norcom). Gets caught up in the rush for black gold. He puts every dollar he has and sales his heard of cattle to finance drilling his first well. An Ohio company strikes oil nearby. This causes Ashston to drill an offset well within the next 30 days. If he doesn't he will lose his rights. Ashton's oil driller, Pete Barkley refuses to keep drilling until Ashton pays him the $4,000 he owes him. Barkley is working in sercet with Walter Worder. He is the cashier at Ranchmans National Bank. He's working with him to stall the drilling long enough to make Ashton lose his permits. Ashton was able to borrow money, but Worder and Barkley framed him for bank robbery. This lands Ashton in jail. Ashton's foreman, Ace Brand (Laurence Criner) knows that Ashton is innocent. He just isn't able to prove it. The bank president's daughter, Alice Anderson (Kathyrn Boyd) who is secretly in love with Ace. She does everything she can to help, but noting clears his name. Ashton is still locked up, the well sitting idle, and there's seven days left til the deadline. Ace and 'Peg' Reynolds (Steve Reynolds) the one-legged cowhand that is loyal to Bar Circle, to secretly finish the well. Together they work nonstop for the next 48 hours. During this process they had to fight off a gang, only to discover that it's a dry hole. With Aston still in jail, everything ruined. Makes an captivating story of action and thrill, with a twist at the end that brings the truth out.

=== Studio's decline ===
Norman Studios' run as a producer of race films ended with the advent of talking films. Richard Norman invested and developed a system to sync audio to the moving images. Units were sold to theaters in the nation, but a new method of putting sound-on-film debuted making Norman's system obsolete.

Filmmakers were already steadily making an exodus to southern California which emerged as a new hub for films. In 1917, John W. Martin was elected mayor of Jacksonville on an anti-film campaign intending to curb the wild excesses of the film industry. Filmmakers did not help their cause by filming car chases on the streets on Sundays, pulling alarms to film fire trucks, or accidentally inciting riots. By the 1930s, the film industry had moved on from Jacksonville while Norman Studios became a distributor of films and then Richard Norman began exhibiting films in the 1940s.

=== Gloria Norman School of Dance ===
Norman's wife, Gloria Norman, began teaching dance in 1935 on the second floor of the main production and film printing building. Richard, who was still in the film business by producing industrial films for the Pure Oil Co. and distributing Joe Louis fight films, felt the sounds of dancing were too loud. A dance floor was built in the set building which is now used as the site for the Circle of Faith Ministries and is the sole building of the original five not owned by Jacksonville currently.

After Gloria sold the studio in 1976, the building became the location for a variety of companies such as plumbing and telephone answering services.

== Revitalization ==
=== Rediscovery ===
Only when Ann Burt, a local resident, discovered the dilapidated buildings were actually an important former movie studio were efforts made to turn the site of Norman Studios into a museum. As a member of Old Arlington Inc, an Arlington area preservationist group, Burt was able to bring together others to save the site.

=== Norman Studios Silent Film Museum ===
Three years after the movement began, the city of Jacksonville bought four of the original five buildings for $260,000 in April 2002. The structures acquired were the main production and processing building, a small cottage for costume changes, a storage shed, and a building that holds the original power generators for the cameras and lights. It was not until February 2004 that the city received a grant from the state of Florida to help preserve and restore the aging complex. Their $140,000 grant was used for emergency roofing, security lighting, a security system, and the largest chunk was paid to Kenneth Smith Architects to redesign the complex into its future life as the Norman Studios Silent Film Museum.

Restoration of the exterior of the property completed in about 2008, while more fundraising has been done to try to purchase the fifth building from the Circle of Faith Ministries.

Jacksonville is working to transfer the Norman Studios Silent Film Museum to the National Park Service. The federal government would pay for the preservation and restoration of the studio as well as the operation of the buildings. Transferring the buildings to the National Park Service will help refurbish the interior of the buildings which the city and the museum group have been unable to afford.

The successful National Historic Landmark nomination was written as part of a graduate-level course at the University of Central Florida.

== Board of directors ==
- Capt. Richard E. & Kathy Norman
- Devan Stuart, board chair, Media & Publicity Director
- Anthony Hodge, Board Co-chair, Webmaster
- Rita Reagan, Historian, Community & Education Outreach Director
- Patricia Hodge, Treasurer
- Laura Lavernia, Secretary
- Emily Rose, Corporate Outreach Director
- Cher Davis, Web Designer/Social Media Strategist, Communications Committee
- Nicholas Clancy
- Amy Lynn Calfee
- Erminda Flores
- Meredith Tano
- Chris Lesley

== List of films ==
- Sleepy Sam, the Sleuth (1915)
- The Love Bug (1919)
- The Green-Eyed Monster (1919)
- The Bull-Dogger (1921)
- The Crimson Skull (1922)
- Regeneration (1923)
- The Flying Ace (1926)
- Black Gold (1928)
