= Jenks Branch, Texas =

Town of former slaves in Williamson County, Texas

Jenks Branch, also known as the Miller Community, was a freedmens colony located between the modern towns of Leander and Liberty Hill in Williamson County, Texas. The community began when Milas Miller, a formerly enslaved man, purchased land in 1870 near the Jenks Branch Creek on the south side of the San Gabriel River. By 1880 he owned over 1000 acres of land.

== History ==
The community traces its roots to the purchase of hundreds of acres of land by Milas Miller near Jenks Branch Creek. The creek is named for two early land owners John W. Jenks and John W. Branch. Milas was born enslaved in South Carolina in York County between 1824 and 1827 and was brought to Texas by his owners when they moved to Williamson County in the 1850s. Other Black people purchased land nearby Miller and the community began to build. In total, Black families owned more than 1100 acres. Some also rented land from the Black land owners. Other family names associated with the community include McClain, Johnson, Mason, Barton, Faubion, Schooley, Huddleston, Hollingsworth, Pickett, Gant, and Inman.

Milas Miller built a brush arbor to use for school and church. Later the Liberty Chapel African Methodist Episcopal Church was built just west of the arbor. Two cemeteries were created near the church on land given by Joe McClain and William David Miller. The Independent American Knights of Liberty established and built a lodge about a half mile east of the church. It was torn down in 1913.

== Schools ==
Jenks Branch held its first school under the brush arbor mentioned above. Later school was held in a building, possibly the same building used for church services. In 1903 there were 49 students enrolled but in 1949 the school was consolidated into the Liberty Hill Independent School District.

== Cemeteries ==
Two cemeteries are associated with Jenks Branch. The first, known as Miller I, the Old Miller, or the Cedar Brake Cemetery, is located on private property at 30.6175°N 97.8841°W. This cemetery contains about 33 burials and the oldest is from 1910. The other cemetery is Miller II. This cemetery is located on the west side of Bagdad Road at 30.6113°N 97.8996°W. It contained 106 burials as of 2019 but is still in use by the families descendants. Many military veterans, beginning with those who served in World War I, are buried here.

== Notable people ==
Several Black professionals were born and lived in Jenks Branch. Among them were doctors and lawyers including Robert Miller, a nephew of the community's founder. Additionally Bill Pickett, famous for inventing the rodeo event now known as steer wrestling, was born here and participated in the 101 Ranch Wild West Show and appeared in early Hollywood films.

== Preservation ==
In June 2020, the city of Liberty Hill hired Acacia Heritage Consulting to conduct research on Jenks Branch for possible inclusion in a newly planned park. Additionally, the Texas Freedom Colonies Project is always looking for information on Jenks Branch as is the Leander Historical Preservation Commission.
