= Steve "Peg" Reynolds =

One-legged African-American actor (1892–1945)

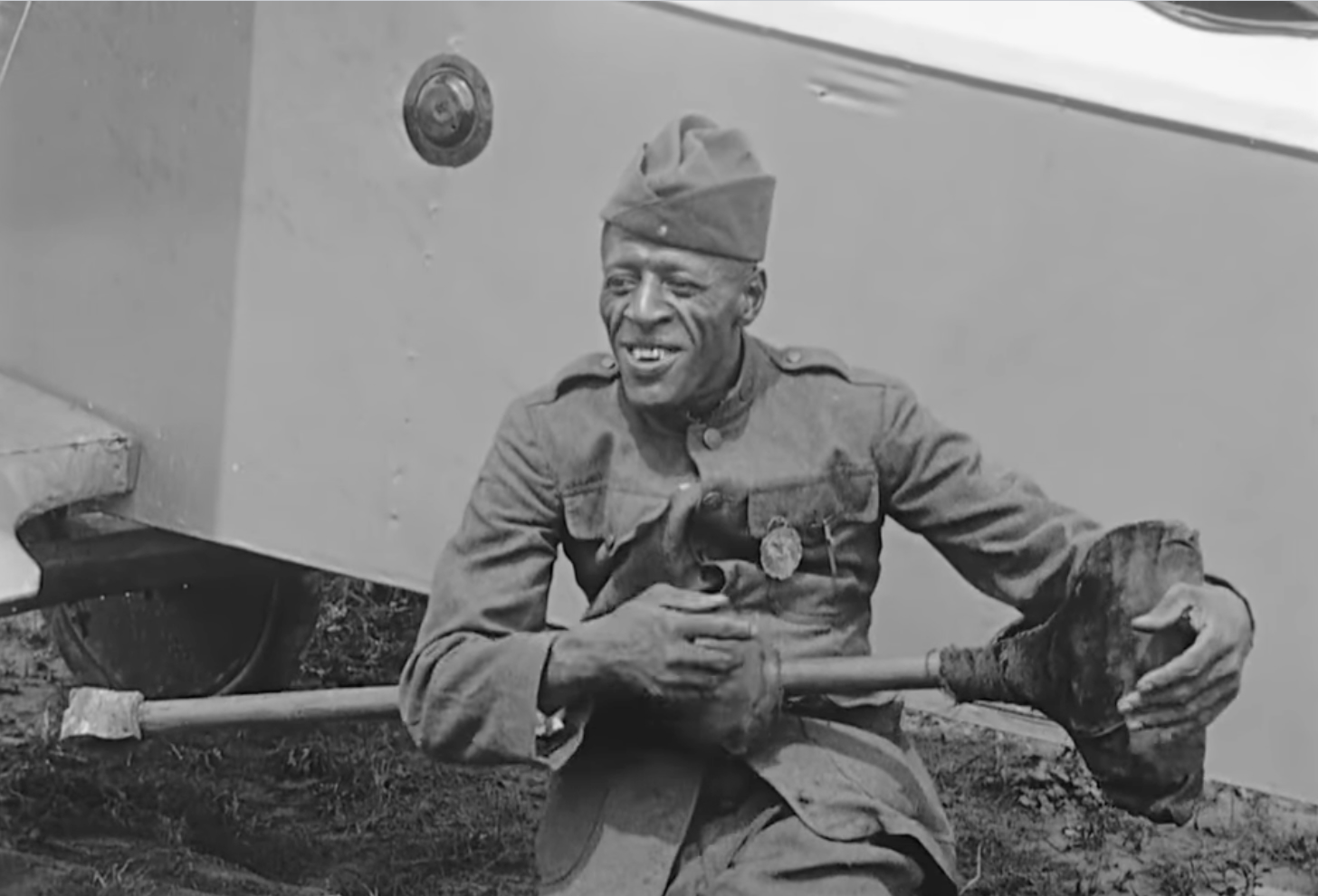
Steve "Peg" Reynolds in The Flying Ace

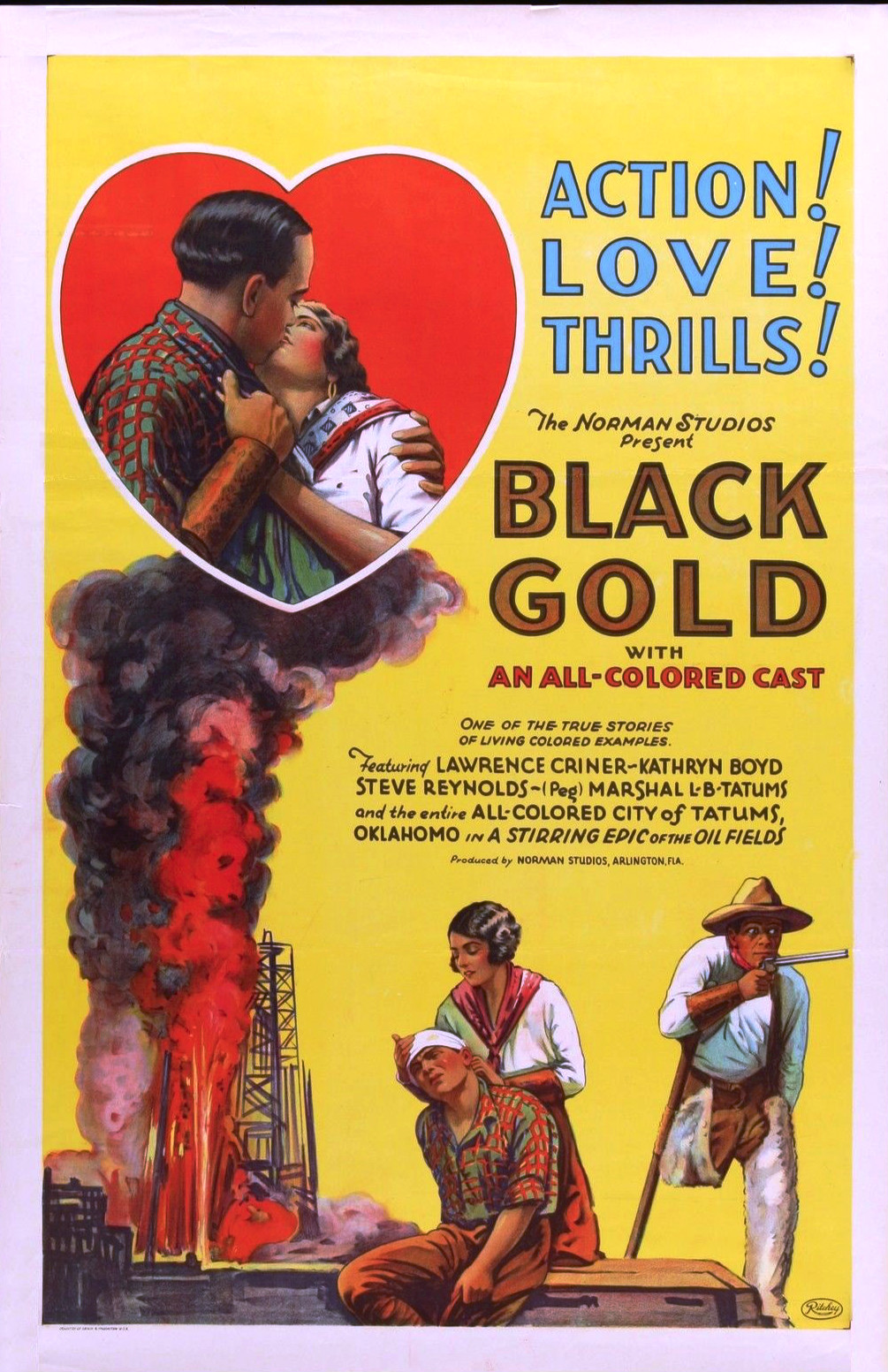
Poster for Black Gold showing Steve "Peg" Reynolds, right

Steve "Peg" Reynolds (1892–1945) was an actor and stuntman in the United States. He was African-American. Despite missing most of his right leg, hence his nickname Peg, he performed in many action sequences, often as comedic relief, but also in heroic roles.

Reynolds was born in Waycross, Georgia, on July 7 of 1892. It is not clear how he lost his leg. His 1917 World War I draft registration card lists the leg as missing. He became a friend of silent filmmaker Richard Norman, founder of Norman Studios, and appeared in all of Norman's race films, which featured an all-Black cast. Reynolds was billed as "the one-legged marvel" "who does stunts that no two-legged man can do." His stunts include "hopping moving trains, climbing on to rooftops and chasing a villain’s speeding car down a dirt road riding a bicycle while shooting at the car with a rifle hidden in his trusty crutch."

An advertisement for the 1922 film The Crimson Skull describes him as "the one-legged Marvel."

Reynolds died in 1945 in Jacksonville, Florida.

== Filmography ==
- The Green-Eyed Monster (1919)
- The Bull-Dogger (1921)
- The Crimson Skull (1922)

- 'Regeneration (1923),
- The Flying Ace (1926)
- Black Gold (1928)
