= Spirit of Columbus 1865–1915 =

The Spirit of Columbus '65–'15
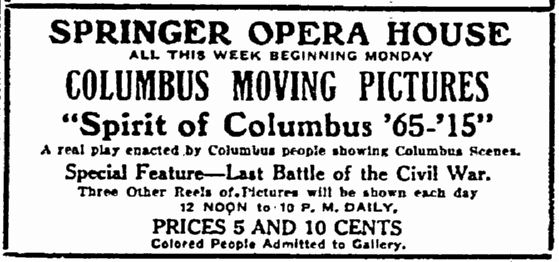
- Columbus Daily Enquirer April 14, 1915
- Directed by: O. W. Lamb
- Written by: O. W. Lamb
- Produced by: O. W. Lamb
- Starring: Richard McNulty
- Distributed by: Paragon Feature Film Company
- Release date: 1915
- Country: United States
- Languages: Silent film English intertitles

Spirit of Columbus '65–'15 is a lost film of the American silent film era, written and directed by itinerant filmmaker O. W. Lamb of the Paragon Feature Film Company. The melodrama was shot in Columbus, Georgia, in March 1915 and included flashback scenes depicting the Battle of Columbus, also known as "last battle of the Civil War", fought in Columbus on April 16, 1865. It is the first movie known to be shot in the city.

The story was similar to several other movies produced by Paragon around this time, including The Lumberjack (1914), filmed in Wausau, Wisconsin and The Blissveldt Romance (1915), filmed in Grand Rapids, Michigan.

The film was first shown during the Homecoming festivities of April 14–17, 1915, which coincided with the 50th anniversary of the battle. In all likelihood, it would have been seen by witnesses of the actual event. After touring the country, the film was returned to Columbus, where it was shown again in November 1916. The Homecoming of 1916 appears to be the last time the film was shown in public.

== Plot ==
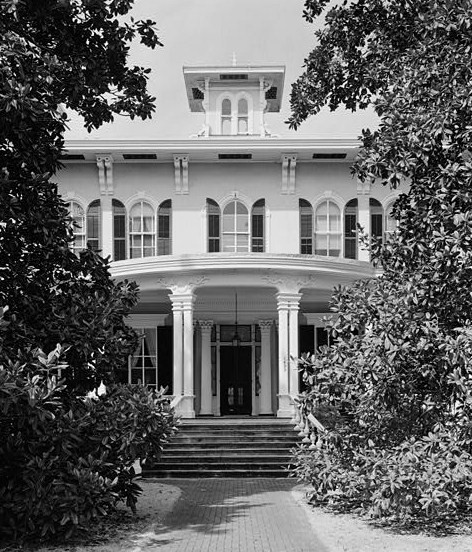
Dinglewood, Dorothy's house

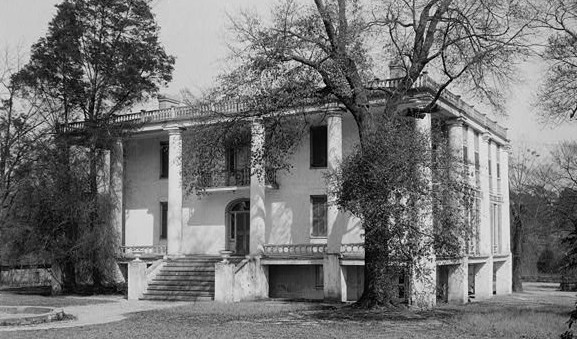
St. Elmo, one of the highlights of Columbus

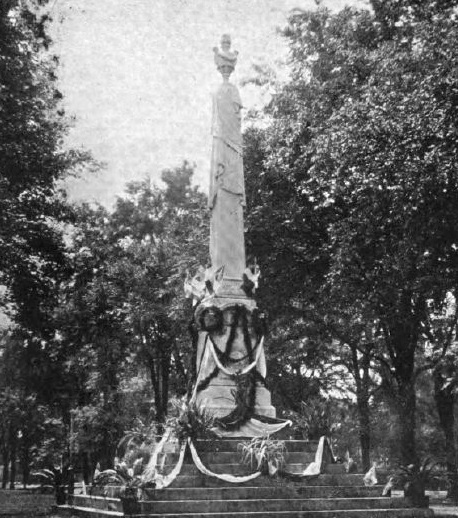
The Confederate Monument, where the young lovers meet the old soldier

In the film, young Dorothy Watkins meets Richard Wentworth through an automobile accident. They meet again at the country club golf course. Richard calls on her at her home (represented by Dinglewood) and meets her family. The couple tours Columbus and sees the many things the community has to offer its residents including the Ralston Hotel, St. Elmo (the house of Augusta Evans Wilson), parks and factories. They also meet an aging soldier at the Confederate monument who tells them stories of the Civil War, including its last major military engagement, the Battle of Columbus. After meeting again at a dance, Richard asks for Dorothy's hand in marriage but, her father refuses to give his blessing. The couple plans to elope by boating across the Chattahoochee River to the Alabama side. The boat overturns, sending the couple over the falls and presumably to their deaths. The couple survives and her father gives his blessing for their union. They marry at Trinity Episcopal Church and the film ends with the couple sailing off on the riverboat W.C. Bradley.

== Cast ==
- Richard Wentworth, cotton manufacturer – Robert McNulty
- Dorothy Watkins, banker's daughter – Mary Slade
- John Watkins, Dorothy's father – G. Gunby Jordan
- Mrs. Watkins, Dorothy's mother – Mrs. W. E. Estes
- Colonel Charles Lamar (alternatively listed as S. W. Sheppard), Confederate soldier – Col. W. S. Sheppard
- Minister – Rev. S. A. Wragg
