= The Bull-Dogger =

1922 film

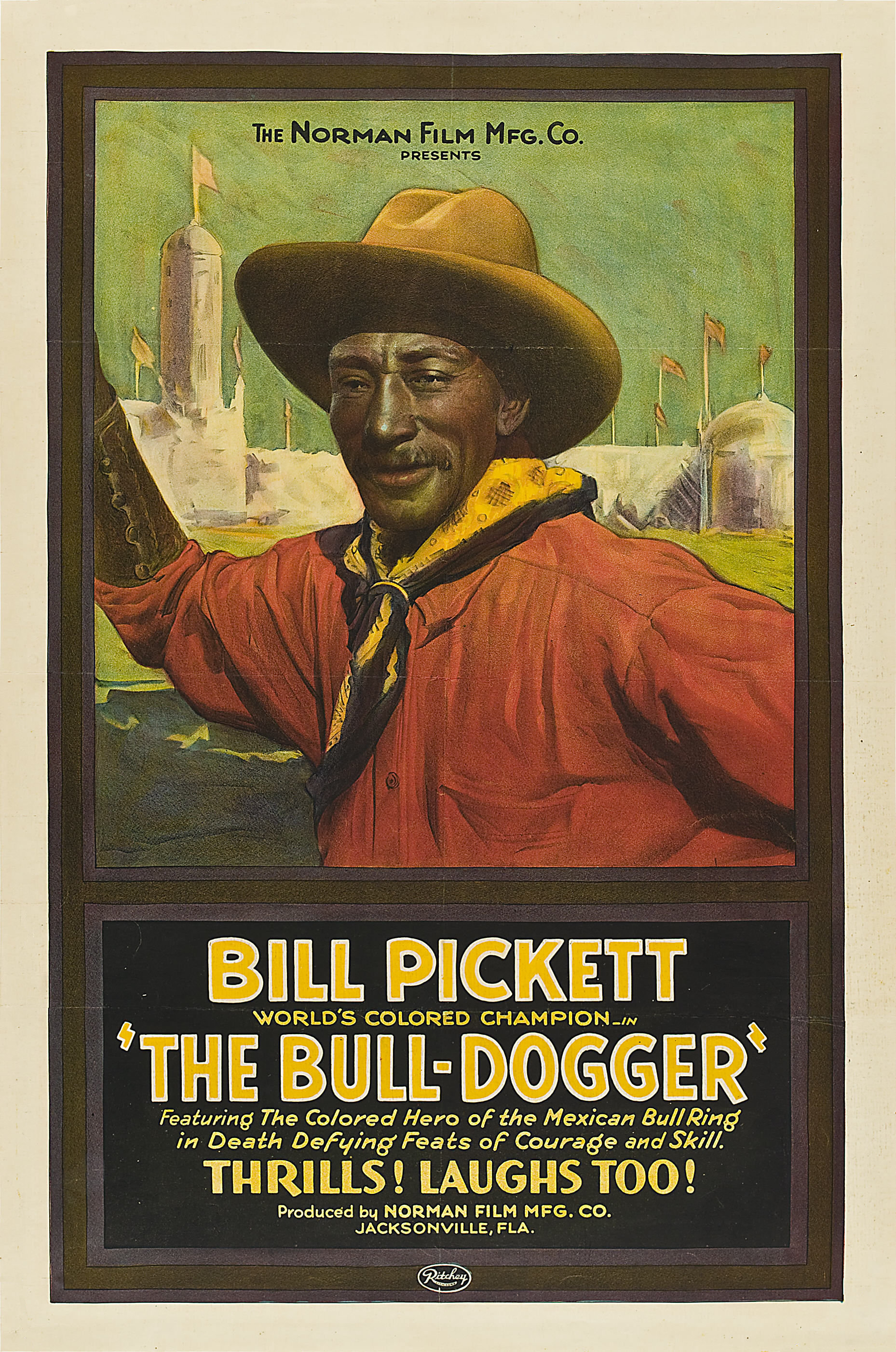
- Directed by: Richard E. Norman
- Produced by: Richard E. Norman
- Starring: Bill Pickett
- Production company: Norman Film Manufacturing Company
- Distributed by: Norman Film Manufacturing Company
- Release date: January 1922
- Country: United States
- Languages: Silent; English intertitles

The Bull-Dogger is a 1922 American five-reel silent Western film starring Bill Pickett, an African American and Native American who is credited with inventing bulldogging, also called steer wrestling. It was produced by Norman Studios and filmed on location in Boley, Oklahoma. The film is presumed to be lost with only fragments known to have survived.

It was an early race film, featuring an African American cast and intended for African American audiences. A poster for the film is in the collection of the National Museum of American History.

== Cast ==
- Bill Pickett
- Bennie Turpin
- Anita Bush
- Steve "Peg" Reynolds
