= The Flying Ace =

1926 film

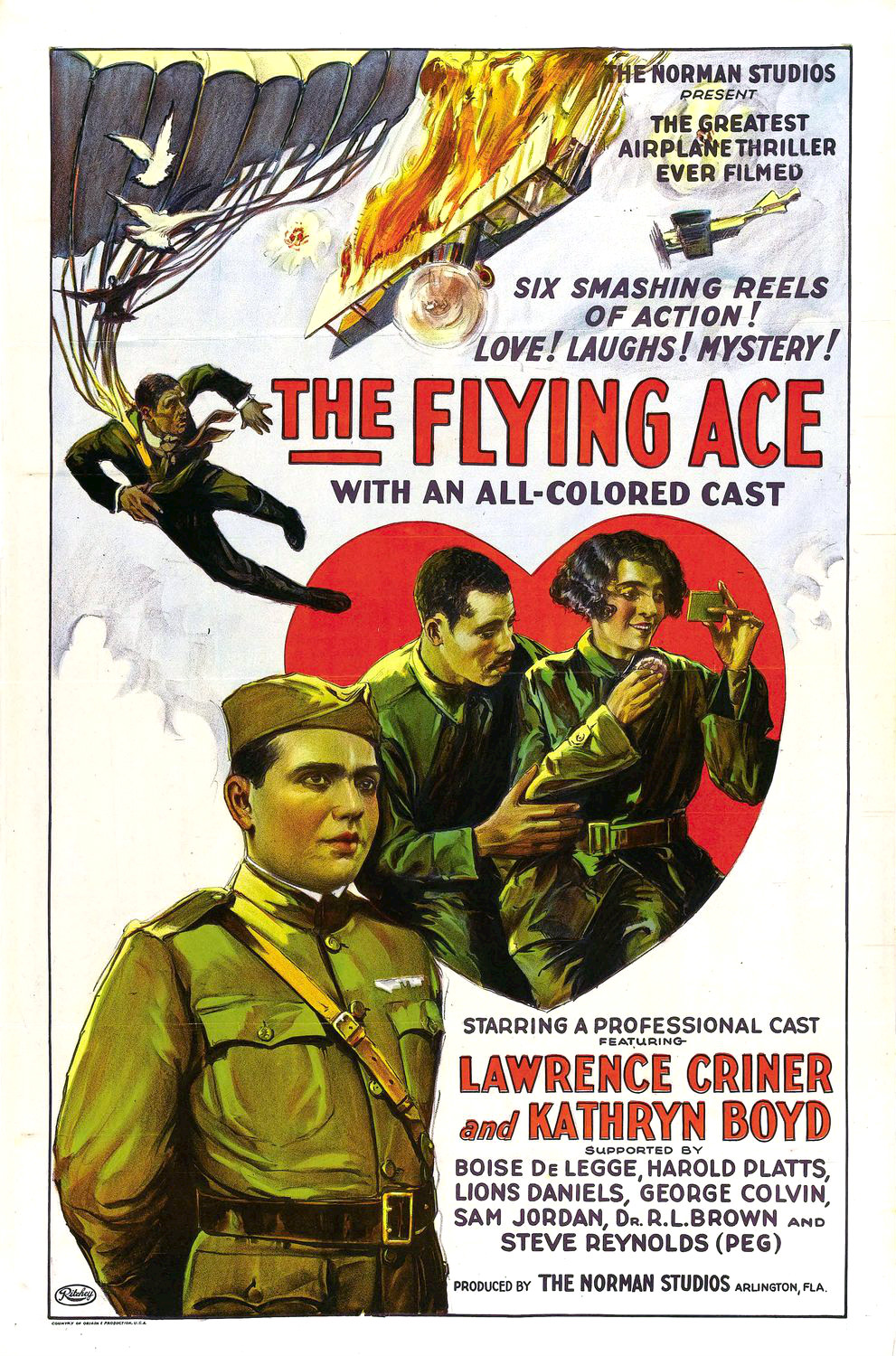
- Theatrical poster
- Directed by: Richard E. Norman
- Written by: Richard E. Norman
- Produced by: Richard E. Norman
- Starring: Laurence Criner; Kathryn Boyd
- Production company: Norman Film Manufacturing Company
- Distributed by: Norman Film Manufacturing Company
- Release date: 1926
- Running time: 65 minutes
- Country: United States
- Language: Silent (English intertitles)

The Flying Ace (1926) by Richard E. Norman

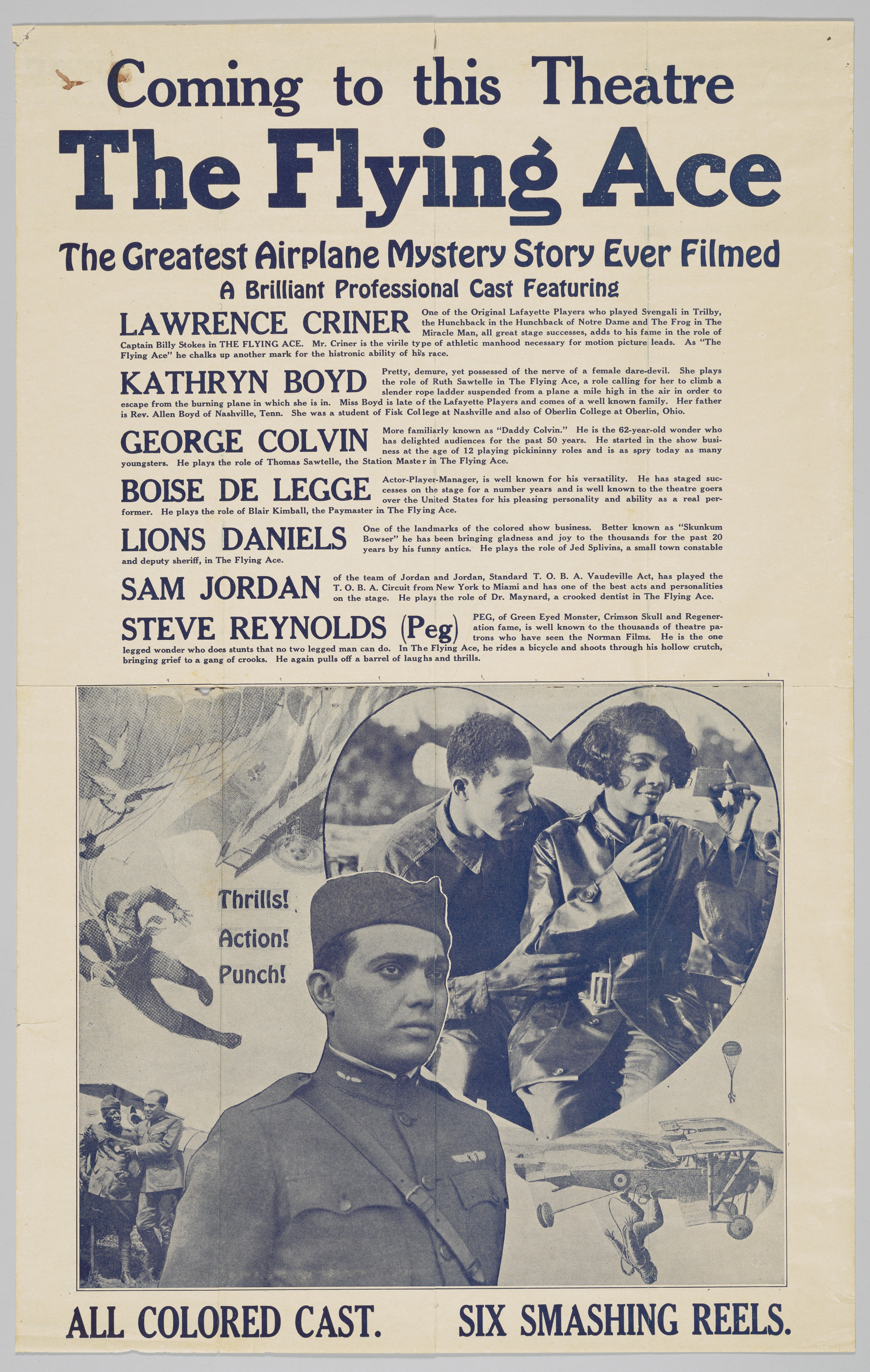
The Flying Ace Press kit with cast details

The Flying Ace is a 1926 American black-and-white silent drama film directed by Richard E. Norman with an all-African-American cast. The story was inspired by Bessie Coleman (who was killed in an aviation accident the same year this film was released) and the six-reel film, made by Norman Studios in Jacksonville, Florida, utilized an all star cast of professional actors. (Note: While filmmaker Richard E. Norman often utilized a mix of professional and non-professional actors. canvassing local communities for actors in his productions, The Flying Ace used an all star cast, see press kit image,)

Films, such as The Flying Ace, that used an all-African-American cast and were shown specifically to African-American audiences, were known as "race films". Norman Studios produced feature length and numerous short race films during the 1920s. The untapped black filmgoing market and the plethora of talented performers unable to get work in mainstream films led to the production of race films by Norman Studios.

Richard Norman's reason for producing race films was not solely a business decision. Although the studio was filling a niche, Norman was also motivated by the state of race relations at the time and wanted to make a positive impact.

In 2021, the film was selected for preservation in the United States National Film Registry by the Library of Congress as being "culturally, historically, or aesthetically significant".

== Plot ==
At the train station in Mayport, Florida, Paymaster Blair Kimball (Boise De Legge) arrives a day early. Dr. A. G. Maynard (Sam Jordan), the local dentist, and Constable Jed Splivins (Lions Daniels) greet him, as pilot Finley Tucker (Harold Platts) looks on.

Kimball is carrying $25,000 for the railroad payroll. Waiting with station master Thomas Sawtelle (George Colvin) in his office, Sawtelle's daughter Ruth (Kathryn Boyd) comes with her father's lunch. When she sees Finley, she asks for a ride in his new aircraft. After the flight, he proposes for the 100th time, but Ruth says she is not certain she loves him.

Captain Billy Stokes (Laurence Criner), a World War I fighter pilot, known as "The Flying Ace" because he downed seven enemy aircraft in France, returns home to resume his former job as a railroad detective. General manager Howard MacAndrews (R.L. Brown) assigns Stokes to find Kimball, who has gone missing, along with the $25,000 company payroll, and apprehend a gang of railroad thieves.

Stokes suspects that Finley is to blame, which is confirmed when he finds Kimball alive and hidden in the tail of Finley's plane. With the help of Peg (Steve Reynolds), Stokes identifies Constable Splivins as a member of Finley's gang, and arrests him. A desperate and crazed Finley flies off with Ruth, whom he has drugged. Stokes chases Finley in his own aircraft but is afraid for Ruth's safety. Shaking his captive and reviving her, Finley says Ruth has to kiss him, or "get out and walk on a cloud."

Suddenly, Finley's aircraft catches fire but Stokes is nearby, dropping a rope ladder to Ruth, who climbs into Stokes' aircraft. Failing to put out the fire, Finley dons a parachute and jumps safely, only to be arrested on the ground. After her ordeal, Stokes comforts Ruth, and makes his feelings about her known.

== Cast ==
The Flying Ace utilized an all star cast of professional actors.

- Laurence Criner as Capt. Billy Stokes (as Lawrence Criner)
- Kathryn Boyd as Ruth Sawtelle
- Boise De Legge as Blair Kimball
- Harold Platts as Finley Tucker
- Lions Daniels as Constable Jed Splivins
- George Colvin as Thomas Sawtelle
- Sam Jordan as Dr. Maynard
- R.L. Brown as Howard McAndrews (credited as Dr. R.L. Brown)
- Steve Reynolds as Peg (credited as Steve "Peg" Reynolds)

== Production ==
With principal photography in Jacksonville, Florida, The Flying Ace was an example of producer Norman's "home talent" films, in which he would travel to various towns with stock footage and a basic script. After recruiting local celebrities for minor roles, they would film a small portion of footage (approximately 200 feet of new material) over the course of a few days. The films were processed at Norman's laboratory in Chicago. Once completed, the films would be screened and any funds raised would be split between Norman and the town where the scenes were shot.

Norman cast J. Laurence Criner, a veteran of Harlem's prestigious all-black theater troupe the Lafayette Players, in the leading role of Captain Billy Stokes, a black pilot who fought in France during World War I. While Eugene Bullard was a black pilot in the Lafayette Escadrille, African-Americans were not allowed to serve as pilots in the United States Army Air Corps until 1940.

The role of pilot Ruth Sawtelle, played by Kathryn Boyd, is loosely based on African-American aviator Bessie Coleman. Coleman had sent a letter to the Norman Studios expressing a wish to be in a film based on her life. Only a day before she was to appear in an exhibition in Jacksonville, she lost her life on April 30, 1926, when she fell from her aircraft. It is unclear whether Norman and Coleman had met.

The Flying Ace was advertised as "the greatest airplane thriller ever filmed"; however, save for one brief sequence, the film was filmed entirely on the ground, using camera tricks, such as the creative use of the camera to create the upside down sequences to imply movement and altitude for the stationary aircraft. (Note: The "upside-down" scene was accomplished by rotating the camera into an upside-down position.) A full-scale mock-up of a Curtiss JN-4 biplane was also constructed.

== Reception ==
Megan Pugh writes, in an essay for the San Francisco Silent Film Festival in 2010, "While it’s impossible to measure the influence The Flying Ace had on its viewers, it is reasonable to assume that audiences found its lead character inspirational."

The Flying Ace is the only one of the Norman Studios-produced "race movies" that is known to have survived. The Library of Congress keeps a copy of the film as it is deemed culturally significant.

The Flying Ace is still shown in many silent film festivals and theaters. Its first public screening in decades took place in July 2010, at the San Francisco Silent Film Festival, where a restored print of The Flying Ace was shown at the Castro Theatre.
