= Bill Pickett =

African American cowboy, rodeo performer and actor (1870–1932)

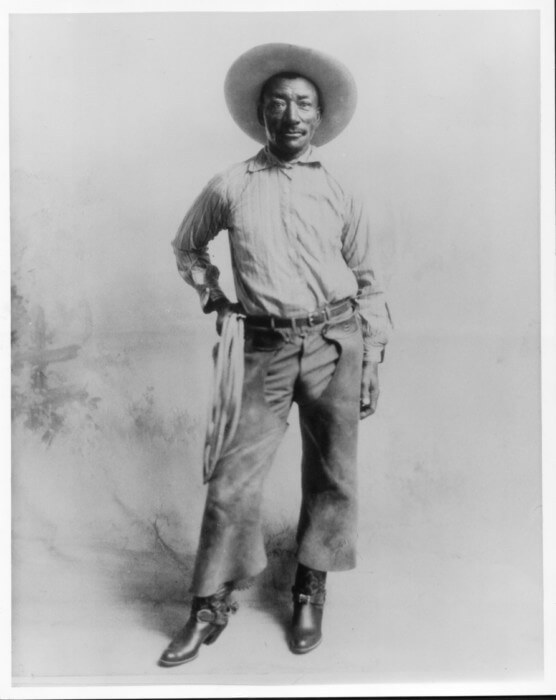
- Pickett c. 1907
- Born: Willie M. Pickett; December 5, 1870; Jenks Branch, Texas, U.S.
- Died: April 2, 1932 (aged 61); Ponca City, Oklahoma, U.S.
- Resting place: White Eagle Monument, Marland, Oklahoma
- Other names: "The Dusky Demon"
- Occupation: Rodeo performer
- Spouse: Maggie Turner (m. 1890)
- Children: 9

Willie M. Pickett (December 5, 1870 – April 2, 1932) was an African American cowboy, rodeo performer, and actor. In 1972, he was the first African American man inducted into the National Rodeo Hall of Fame. In 1989, Pickett was inducted into the ProRodeo Hall of Fame.

== Personal life ==
Pickett was born in the Jenks Branch community of Williamson County, Texas, in 1870. (Jenks Branch, also known as the Miller Community, is in western Williamson County, five miles southeast of Liberty Hill, and near the Travis County line.) He was the second of 13 children born to Thomas Jefferson Pickett, a former enslaved man, and Mary "Janie" Gilbert. Pickett had four brothers and eight sisters. The family's ancestry was African-American and Cherokee. By 1888, the family had moved to Taylor, Texas.

In 1890, Pickett married Maggie Turner, the formerly enslaved daughter of a white southern plantation owner. The couple had nine children.

== Career ==
Pickett left school in the fifth grade to become a ranch hand; he soon began to ride horses and watch the Texas Longhorn steers of his native Texas.

He invented the technique of bulldogging, the skill of grabbing cattle by the horns and wrestling them to the ground. It was known among cattlemen that, with the help of a trained bulldog, a stray steer could be caught. Bill Pickett had seen this happen on many occasions. He also thought that if a bulldog could do this feat, so could he. Pickett practiced his stunt by riding hard, springing from his horse, and wrestling the steer to the ground. Pickett's method for bulldogging was biting a cow on the lip and then falling backward. He also helped cowboys with bulldogging. This method eventually lost popularity as the sport morphed into the steer wrestling that is practiced in rodeos.

Pickett soon became known for his tricks and stunts at local country fairs. With his four brothers, he established The Pickett Brothers Bronco Busters and Rough Riders Association. The name Bill Pickett soon became synonymous with successful rodeos. He did his bulldogging act, traveling about in Texas, Arizona, Wyoming, and Oklahoma.

In 1905, Pickett joined the 101 Ranch Wild West Show that featured the likes of Buffalo Bill, Will Rogers, Tom Mix, Bee Ho Gray, and Zach and Lucille Mulhall; he performed under the name "The Dusky Demon." Pickett was soon a popular performer who toured around the world and appeared in early motion pictures, such as a movie created by Richard E. Norman. Pickett's ethnicity resulted in his not being able to appear at many rodeos, so he often was forced to claim that he was of Comanche heritage in order to perform. In 1921, he appeared in the films The Bull-Dogger and The Crimson Skull.

== Death ==
In 1932, after having retired from Wild West shows, Bill Pickett was kicked in the head by a bronco. After a multi-day coma he died on April 2, 1932; he was buried on the 101 Ranch. He is buried near a 15-foot stone monument to the friendship of Ponca Tribal Chief White Eagle and the Miller Brothers on Monument Hill, also known as the White Eagle Monument to the locals, less than a quarter of a mile to the northeast of Marland, Oklahoma.

== Legacy ==
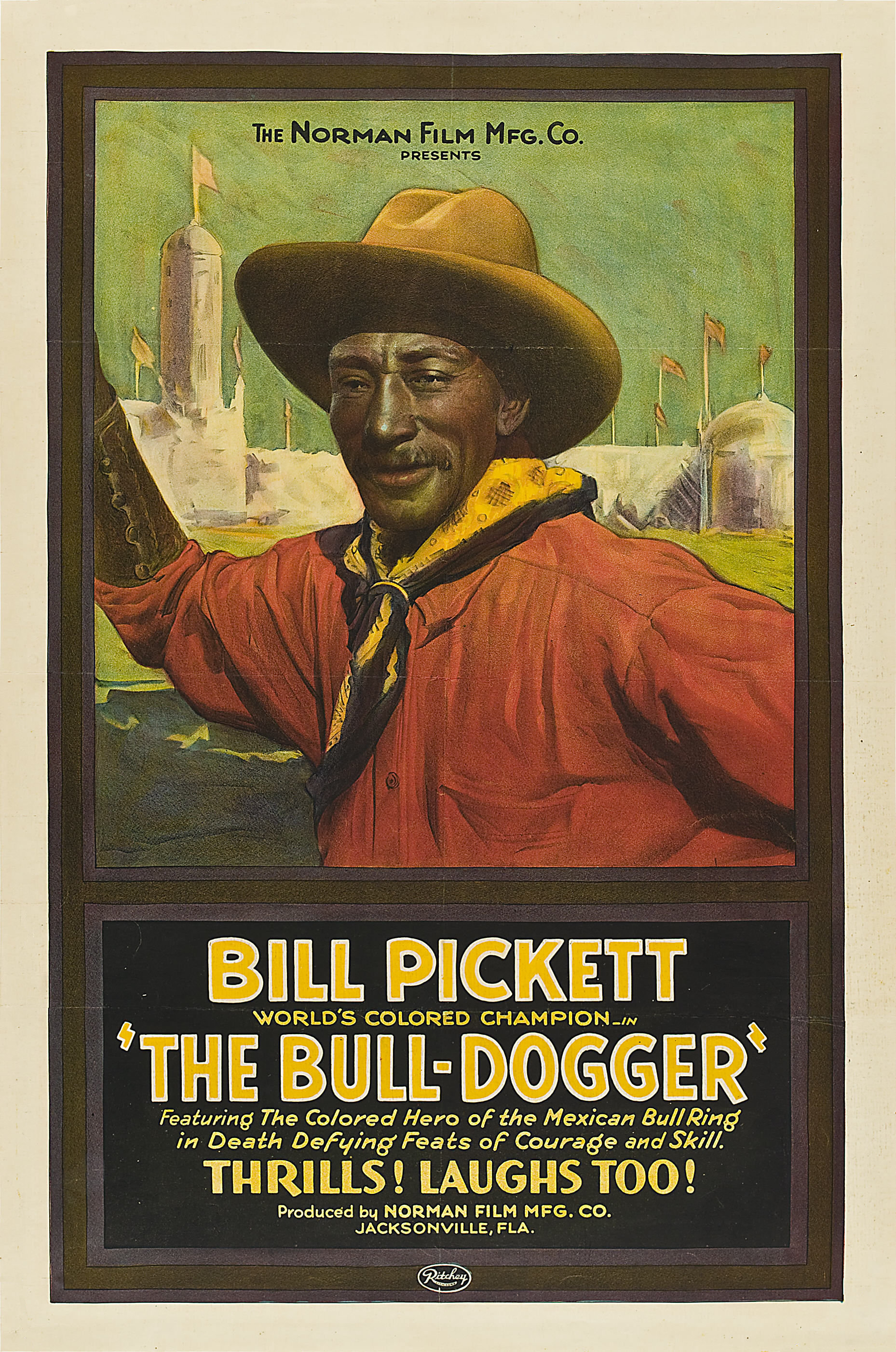
Bill Pickett, c.1922

In 1972, Pickett was inducted into the National Rodeo Hall of Fame of the National Cowboy and Western Heritage Museum. In 1989, Pickett was inducted into the ProRodeo Hall of Fame.

Concert promoter Lu Vason founded the Bill Pickett Invitational Rodeo in 1984. The touring rodeo celebrates Black cowboys.

In 1987, a statue of Pickett performing his signature "bulldogging" maneuver, made by artist Lisa Perry, was presented to the city of Fort Worth, Texas by the North Fort Worth Historical Society. The statue is installed in the Fort Worth Stockyards Historic District.

The United States Postal Service chose to include Bill Pickett in the Legends of the West commemorative sheet unveiled in December 1993. One month later, the Pickett family informed the Postal Service that the likeness was incorrect. Its source material was a misidentified photograph of Bill Pickett's brother and fellow cowboy star, Ben Pickett. In October 1994, the USPS released corrected stamps based on the poster for The Bull-Dogger.

In March 2015, the Taylor City Council announced that a street that leads to the rodeo arena will be renamed to honor Bill Pickett.

On June 2, 2017 a new statue of Bill Pickett was unveiled in his hometown of Taylor, Texas. It is prominently displayed at the intersection of 2nd and Main Streets in the downtown.

On August 6, 2018, Bill Pickett was inducted into the Jim Thorpe Association's Oklahoma Sports Hall of Fame.

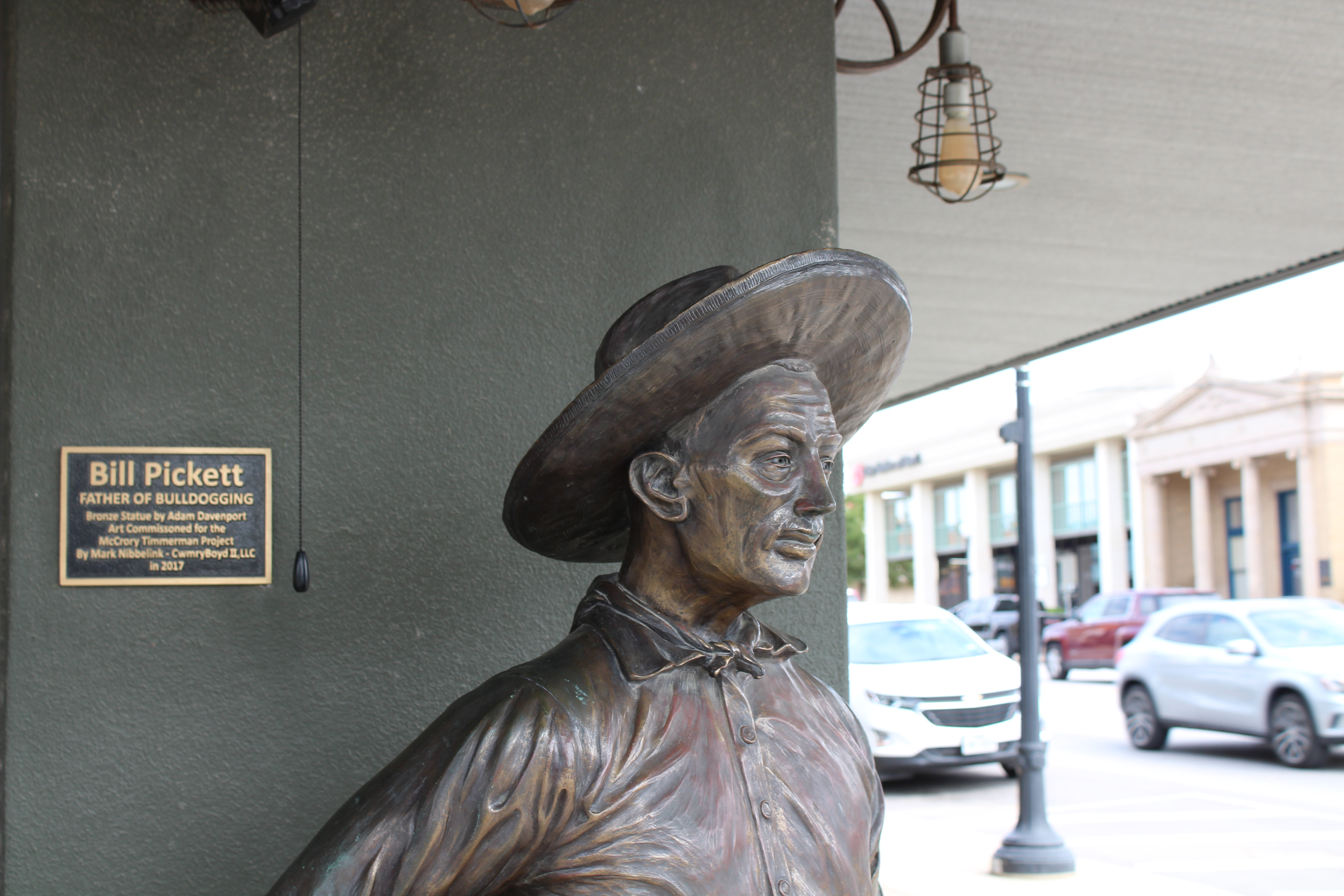
Statue of Bill Pickett in Taylor, Texas

A hill in Burnet County, Texas was named for Pickett in 2021. A trail with an interpretive sign in Georgetown, Texas honors Pickett.

== In popular culture ==
In the 2021 film The Harder They Fall directed by Jeymes Samuel, a fictional character, a gunman named Bill Pickett, is played by actor Edi Gathegi. In the related film They Die by Dawn (2013), a character named Bill Picket is portrayed by Bokeem Woodbine.

Pickett is referenced in season 4 episode 5 of Baywatch when the African-American cop character played by Gregory Alan Williams wants to ride a horse to capture criminals, bringing up that Pickett was the "first cowboy." Pickett is referenced in the 1996 film Get on the Bus as the man who created steer wrestling. In the 1994 feature film The Cowboy Way, Bill Pickett is referenced by Ernie Hudson when discussing famous black cowboys. He is later referred to as "William Pickett" by Woody Harrelson.

== Honors ==
- 1972 Rodeo Hall of Fame of the National Cowboy and Western Heritage Museum
- 1989 ProRodeo Hall of Fame
- 1997 Texas Trail of Fame
- 2003 National Multicultural Western Heritage Museum and Hall of Fame

== See also ==
- Bose Ikard
- Isom Dart
- Nat Love
