= Melton Barker =

American filmmaker

- Born: Ennis Melton Barker; February 14, 1903; Keller, Texas, US
- Died: March 1977 (aged 74)
- Occupation: Itinerant Filmmaker
- Years active: 1930s–1970s

Melton Barker (February 14, 1903 – March 1977) was an itinerant filmmaker who produced and directed numerous films with his company, Melton Barker Juvenile Productions, from the 1930s though the 1970s. These films were shot across the United States with casts of children who each paid a fee for the opportunity to star in the two-reel shorts.

== Itinerant Films ==
During the first half of the twentieth century, filmmakers traveled across the United States, Canada, Europe, Australia and New Zealand, making a business of shooting films starring local talent for a fee. These home talent films, or town boosters, featured community landmarks, businesses, and local residents. Not all of these films had a narrative structure; some simply shot the town and its populace. Others would mimic popular films, or create some sort of limited narrative in order to focus on the local community. Once shot and completed, these films would be shown locally before a major theatrical feature was screened.

== The Kidnappers Foil ==
The Kidnappers Foil was one of Melton Barker's films. The same script would be shot repeatedly in different towns with a different cast across the United States from the 1930s though the 1950s. Melton Barker Juvenile Productions would contact local theaters and newspapers to sponsor the film, after which a casting call for children would go out and parents would be encouraged to fill out the paperwork provided and after paying a small fee, the children would participate in a short audition before a representative of the production company. This company would consist of a skeleton crew consisting of Melton Barker, a camera man, a sound man, and an assistant.

The plot of the films hardly changed with each production. In each a young girl, Betty Davis, is kidnapped and held for ransom following her birthday. Her father offers a reward of $1,000 for her return. A group of young boys led by Butch, imagine what they could do with the reward and set out in search for Betty. Soon another group of even younger children attempt to join the search, but are refused and set out upon their own. A group of local girls soon join with Butch and his gang. After several days with no results the gang once again imagines what they will do with the money. Soon after they catch the kidnappers napping, and rescue Betty. All of the children are invited to Betty's house to celebrate, where they perform several song and dance numbers. The Kidnappers Foil was produced in different cities across the country over one hundred and thirty times.

Once completed these films would be screened locally, prior to a Hollywood feature film yet receiving more advertising space. These films tended to get positive reviews regardless of the quality.

Barker would film The Kidnappers Foil many times from the 1930s through the 1970s. He also worked on several non-fiction itinerant films. These were The Centralia Story and The Cape Girardeau Story. His last known residence was Meridian, Mississippi. He died in March 1977 while still on the road.

In 2012 The Kidnappers Foil was added to the Library of Congress' National Film Registry.
