= The Green Eyed Monster (1919 film) =

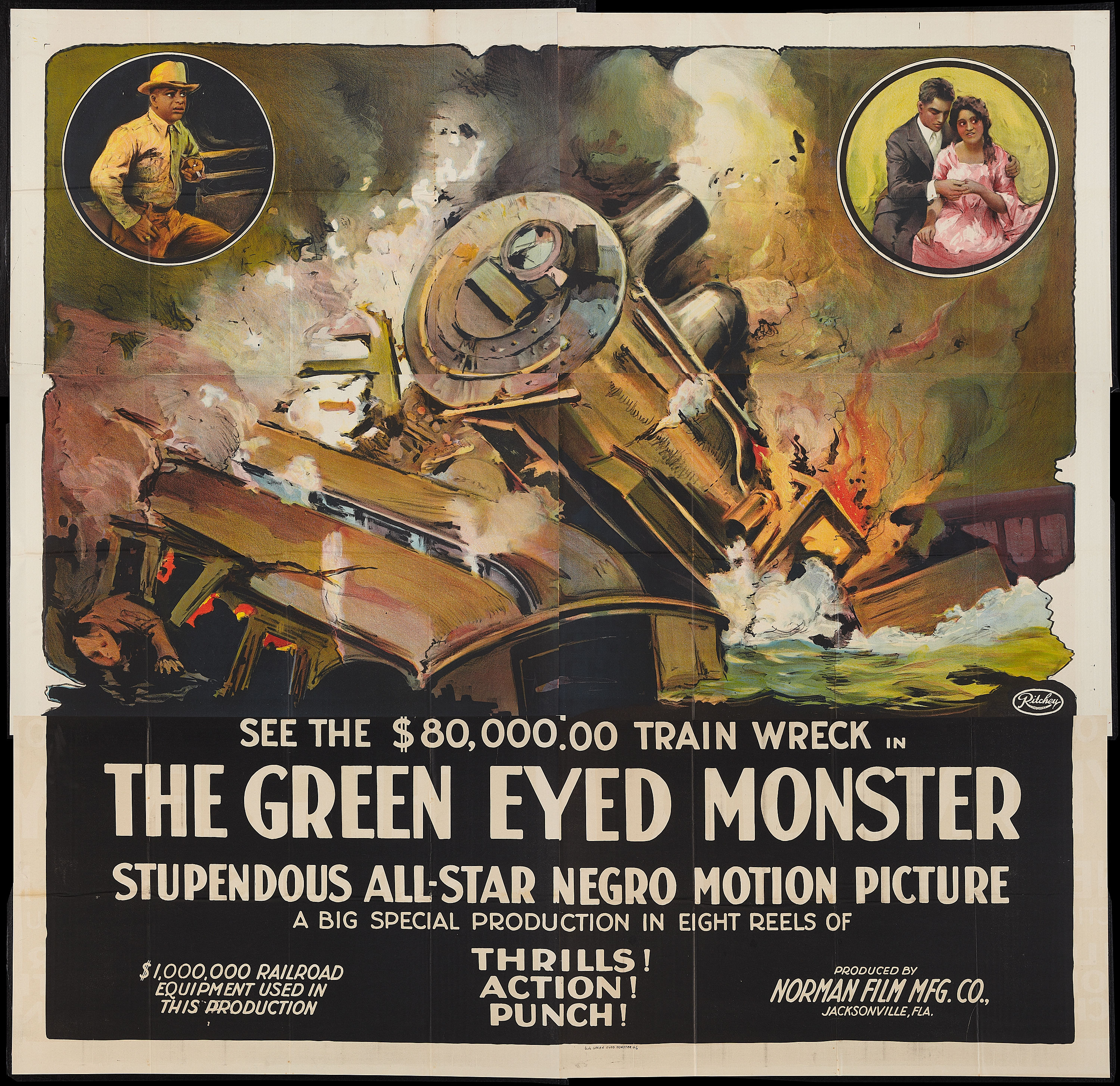
- Produced by: Norman Film Company
- Starring: Jack Austin; Louise Dunbar
- Distributed by: Norman Film
- Release dates: 1919; 1921 (Chicago)
- Running time: 8 reels
- Country: USA
- Language: Silent..English titles

The Green Eyed Monster is a lost 1919 black and white silent film action adventure with little to scant information as to its release. It was produced by the Norman Film Manufacturing Company, a historic all-black film production company. Various dates of release are quoted in 1919 and 1921.

== Cast ==
- Jack Austin
- Louise Dunbar
- Steve "Peg" Reynolds
- Robert A. Stuart

== See also ==
- The Green-Eyed Monster (1916 film)
- The Green-Eyed Monster (2001 film)
