= Douglas K. Bryant =

American politician (born 1949)

Member of the Wyoming House of Representatives from the Platte County district
- In office January 11, 1977 – January 11, 1983

Personal details
- Born: January 31, 1949 (age 77) White Plains, New York, U.S.
- Party: Democratic
- Spouse: Gail Morley-Bryant
- Children: 2
- Education: Wheatland High School; University of Wyoming
- Profession: Politician

Douglas K. Bryant (born January 31, 1949) is an American politician from Wheatland, Wyoming, who served in the Wyoming House of Representatives from 1977 to 1983, representing Platte County as a Democrat in the 44th, 45th, and 46th Wyoming Legislatures.

== Early life and education ==
Bryant was born in White Plains, New York, on January 31, 1949. He attended Wheatland High School, graduating in 1967, and then the University of Wyoming.

== Career ==
Bryant was elected to the Wyoming House of Representatives to represent Platte County as a Democrat. He served in this position from 1977 to 1983. (Note: According to the Wyoming Legislature, Bryant served from 1977 to 1982.)

During his time in office, Bryant served on the Aging Advisory Council, the Advisory Committee on Emergency Medical Services, and the Office of Land Use Administration. He also served on the following standing committees:

- Journal (1977)
- Labor, Health and Social Services (1977–1982)
- Agriculture, Public Lands and Water Resources (1979–1982)

== Personal life ==
Bryant has a wife and two children.

== Notes ==
Wyoming House of Representatives
Preceded by —	Member of the Wyoming House of Representatives from the Platte County district 1977–1983	Succeeded by —
