= List of National Historic Landmarks in Wyoming =

The list of National Historic Landmarks in Wyoming contains the landmarks designated by the U.S. Federal Government located in the U.S. state of Wyoming. There are 28 National Historic Landmarks (NHLs) in Wyoming. The first designated were two on December 19, 1960; the latest was on December 11, 2023.

== Key ==
	National Historic Landmark
^{†}	National Historic Landmark District
^{#}	National Historic Site, National Historical Park, National Memorial, or National Monument
^{*}	Delisted Landmark

== List ==
	Landmark name	Image	Date designated	Location	County	Description
1	Ames Monument	Ames Monument	October 31, 2016 (#72001296)	Sherman; 41°07′52″N 105°23′53″W	Albany	A pivotal and highly significant work in the career of Henry Hobson Richardson.
2	Expedition Island	Expedition Island	October 18, 1968 (#68000056)	Green River; 41°31′23″N 109°28′16″W	Sweetwater	Expedition Island is a park in Green River, Wyoming that marks the area where Major John Wesley Powell started an expedition down the Green River and Colorado River in 1871.
3^{†}	Fort D.A. Russell	Fort D.A. Russell	May 15, 1975 (#69000191)	Cheyenne; 41°09′59″N 104°51′46″W	Laramie	In 1867, the fort was established to protect workers for the Union Pacific Railroad. In 1871, it was base to the Pawnee scout battalion.
4	Fort Phil Kearny and Associated Sites	Fort Phil Kearny and Associated Sites	December 19, 1960 (#66000756)	Story; 44°31′56″N 106°49′35″W	Johnson	Fort Phil Kearny was an outpost of the United States Army that existed in the late 1860s in present-day northeastern Wyoming along the Bozeman Trail.
5^{†}	Fort Yellowstone	Fort Yellowstone	July 31, 2003 (#03001032)	Yellowstone National Park; 44°58′30″N 110°41′53″W	Park	Fort Yellowstone is a former United States Army base created in 1888 to guard the park. It became administrative headquarters of Yellowstone National Park.
6	Heart Mountain Relocation Center	Heart Mountain Relocation Center	September 20, 2006 (#85003167)	Ralston; 44°40′18″N 108°56′47″W	Park	An internment camp for Japanese-Americans during World War II
7	Hell Gap Paleoindian Site (48GO305)		December 23, 2016 (#100000877)	Guernsey vicinity 42°24′30″N 104°38′22″W	Goshen	
8	Horner Site		January 20, 1961 (#66000758)	Cody; 44°33′21″N 108°59′39″W	Park	Non-public archaeological site yielding evidence of a flint tool culture, with occupation dating back to 5000 BC.
9	Independence Rock	Independence Rock	January 20, 1961 (#66000757)	Casper; 42°29′37″N 107°07′46″W	Natrona	Independence Rock is a large granite rock, approximately 130 ft (40 m) high, which served as a landmark on the Oregon Trail and California Trail in southwestern Natrona County.
10^{†}	Jackson Lake Lodge	Jackson Lake Lodge	July 31, 2003 (#03001039)	Grand Teton National Park; 43°52′39″N 110°34′36″W	Teton	Designed by architect Gilbert Stanley Underwood and completed in 1955, the lodge built in International style represents a break from the traditional rustic style of architecture used by the National Park Service.
11^{†}	Lake Guernsey State Park	Lake Guernsey State Park	September 25, 1997 (#80004051)	Guernsey; 42°18′14″N 104°46′10″W	Platte	Model Civilian Conservation Corps-built state park buildings and structures
12	Lake Hotel	Lake Hotel	February 27, 2015 (#91000637)	North side of Lake Yellowstone St., Yellowstone National Park; 44°32′59″N 110°24′00″W	Teton	
13	Medicine Mountain	Medicine Mountain	August 29, 1970 (#69000184)	Lovell; 44°49′32″N 107°55′15″W	Big Horn	Site of a native American medicine wheel, used for healing and religious purposes
14^{†}	Murie Ranch Historic District	Murie Ranch Historic District	February 17, 2006 (#98001039)	Grand Teton National Park; 43°39′02″N 110°43′37″W	Teton	A group of several cabins in Grand Teton National Park that were owned by naturalist Olaus Murie, his wife Margaret Murie and scientist Adolph Murie and his wife Louise in the 1940s.
15^{†}	Norris, Madison, and Fishing Bridge Museums	Norris, Madison, and Fishing Bridge Museums	May 28, 1987 (#87001445)	Yellowstone National Park; 44°43′27″N 110°42′21″W	Teton and Park	Three "trailside museums" in National Park Service Rustic style within Yellowstone National Park
16	Obsidian Cliff	Obsidian Cliff	June 19, 1996 (#96000973)	Yellowstone National Park; 44°49′08″N 110°43′40″W	Park	An exposure of obsidian (volcanic glass). It was a notable source of lithic materials for prehistoric peoples.
17	Old Faithful Inn	Old Faithful Inn	May 28, 1987 (#73000226)	Yellowstone National Park; 44°27′28″N 110°49′49″W	Teton	National Park Service architecture
18	Oregon Trail Ruts	Oregon Trail Ruts	May 23, 1966 (#66000761)	Guernsey; 42°15′22″N 104°44′58″W	Platte	One half mile long section of Oregon Trail, worn 2–6 feet into sandstone ridge
19^{†}	J. C. Penney Historic District	J. C. Penney Historic District	June 2, 1978 (#78002830)	Kemmerer; 41°47′41″N 110°32′09″W	Lincoln	Buildings associated with James Cash Penney's founding of J. C. Penney department store chain here.
20	Quebec 01 Launch Control Facility	Quebec 01 Launch Control Facility	December 11, 2023 (#100009836)	Chugwater vicinity 41°32′35″N 104°54′05″W	Laramie	Now a state historic site; launch control facility for a Cold War-era missile complex
21	Sheridan Inn	Sheridan Inn	January 29, 1964 (#66000762)	Sheridan; 44°48′25″N 106°57′12″W	Sheridan	Inn operated by Buffalo Bill Cody
22	South Pass	South Pass	January 20, 1961 (#66000754)	South Pass City; 42°22′12″N 108°54′49″W	Fremont	This was the easiest crossing point of the Continental Divide during the 19th century, serving American pioneers, fur traders, and miners. The access it offered to the Pacific Northwest greatly strengthened the U.S. claim to that region.
23	Tom Sun Ranch	Tom Sun Ranch	December 19, 1960 (#66000753)	Casper; 42°26′36″N 107°13′06″W	Carbon and Natrona	Tom Sun Ranch was a typical medium-sized ranching operation of the open range period in the 1870s-80s. Tom Sun was a French-Canadian cattleman and frontiersman.
24	Swan Land and Cattle Company Headquarters	Swan Land and Cattle Company Headquarters	July 19, 1964 (#66000760)	Chugwater; 41°45′17″N 104°49′10″W	Platte	The surviving buildings include the ranchhouse, barn, and commissary, for this company organized in Scotland in 1883.
25	Union Pacific Railroad Depot	Union Pacific Railroad Depot	February 15, 2006 (#73001934)	Cheyenne; 41°07′54″N 104°48′51″W	Laramie	Railroad depot and related buildings.
26	Upper Green River Rendezvous Site	Upper Green River Rendezvous Site	November 5, 1961 (#66000763)	Daniel; 42°52′21″N 110°02′20″W	Sublette	Location of several Rocky Mountain Rendezvous, a 1,200 acres (490 ha) site on the Green River
27	Wapiti Ranger Station	Wapiti Ranger Station	May 23, 1963 (#66000759)	Wapiti; 44°27′50″N 109°36′58″W	Park	First U.S. Forest Service ranger station
28	Wyoming State Capitol	Wyoming State Capitol	May 4, 1987 (#73001935)	Cheyenne; 41°08′23″N 104°49′12″W	Laramie	Current state capitol building

== See also ==
- Historic preservation
- List of National Historic Landmarks by state
- National Register of Historic Places listings in Wyoming
- List of National Natural Landmarks in Wyoming
- Wyoming Historical Landmarks
