= Wyoming Highway 315 =

State highway in Wyoming, United States

Wyoming Highway 315
- Pioneer Road
- WYO 315 highlighted in red

Route information
- Maintained by WYDOT
- Length: 3.01 mi (4.84 km)

Major junctions
- South end: WYO 314
- North end: Bordeaux Road

Location
- Country: United States
- State: Wyoming
- Counties: Platte

Highway system
- Wyoming State Highway System; Interstate; US; State
← WYO 314	→ WYO 316

Wyoming Highway 315 (WYO 315) is a 3.01-mile-long (4.84 km) state highway in the southeastern part of Platte County, Wyoming, named Pioneer Road, located just east of Slater, Wyoming.

== Route description ==
Wyoming Highway 315 begins its south end at Wyoming Highway 314 (Slater Road) and travels north 3.01 miles (4.84 km) to its north end at Platte CR 232 (Bordeaux Road).

== Major intersections ==
The entire route is in Platte County.

Location	mi	km	Destinations	Notes
Slater	0.00	0.00	WYO 314	
	3.01	4.84	Bordeaux Road	
1.000 mi = 1.609 km; 1.000 km = 0.621 mi
