= Wyoming Highway 316 =

State highway in Platte County, Wyoming, United States

Wyoming Highway 316
- Gilchrist Street; Antelope Gap Road
- WYO 316 highlighted in red

Route information
- Maintained by WYDOT
- Length: 11.91 mi (19.17 km)

Major junctions
- West end: I-25 BL / US 87 Bus. in Wheatland
- East end: Antelope Gap Road at Dickinson Hill Road/Deer Creek Road

Location
- Country: United States
- State: Wyoming
- Counties: Platte

Highway system
- Wyoming State Highway System; Interstate; US; State
← WYO 315	→ WYO 317

Wyoming Highway 316 (WYO 316) is an 11.91-mile-long (19.17 km) east–west Wyoming state road in central Platte County.

== Route description ==
Wyoming Highway 316 begins its western end in on the eastern side of Wheatland at I-25 Business/US 87 Business (9th Street). Highway 316 heads east, named Gilchrist Street, crosses railroad tracks and Rock Creek before passing along the south side of Phifer Airfield on Wheatland's eastern edge. WYO 316 leaves Wheatland at eight-tenths of a mile and passes through the community (CDP) of Chugcreek and changes names to Antelope Gap Road. Past Chugcreek, WYO 316 crosses Chugwater Creek as it continues east until reaching its end at a junction with Dickinson Hill and Deer Creek Roads east of Wheatland.

== History ==
The designation of Highway 316 was originally signed in Converse and Campbell counties between 1926 and 1933 along present day Wyoming Highway 387 and Highway 59 between Midwest and Gillette. That designation lasted till about 1940 when it was renumbered to Wyoming Highway 116, no relation to present-day Highway 116.

== Major intersections ==
The entire route is in Platte County.

Location	mi	km	Destinations	Notes
Wheatland	0.00	0.00	I-25 BL / US 87 Bus.	Western terminus of WYO 316
	11.91	19.17	Antelope Gap Road at Dickinson Hill Road/Deer Creek Road	Eastern terminus of WYO 316
1.000 mi = 1.609 km; 1.000 km = 0.621 mi
