= Swanland (disambiguation) =

Swanland is a village in the East Riding of Yorkshire in England.

Swanland or Swan Land may also refer to:-

- Swan Land District, a district in Western Australia
- Swan Land and Cattle Company Headquarters, a Wyoming National Historic Landmark
- MV Swanland (1977-2011), cargo vessel that sank in the Irish Sea
