= Wheatland station =

Wheatland

General information
- Location: 701 Gilchrist Street ( WYO 316), Wheatland, Wyoming 82201
- System: Former Burlington Route passenger station
- Platforms: 1

History
- Opened: 1895

Services
Preceding station	Burlington Route	Following station
Wendover Terminus	Wendover – Denver (Colorado and Southern Railway)	Chugwater toward Denver
- Wheatland Railroad Depot
- Formerly listed on the U.S. National Register of Historic Places
- Location within Wyoming Location within the United States
- Location: 701 Gilchrist Street., Wheatland, Wyoming
- Coordinates: 42°3′15″N 104°57′3″W
- Area: 0.2 acres (0.081 ha)
- Built: 1895
- Built by: Denver & Gulf Railroad
- Architect: Goodrich, Charlie
- NRHP reference No.: 96000077

Significant dates
- Added to NRHP: February 16, 1996
- Removed from NRHP: September 5, 2017
Location

Wheatland station of the Union Pacific, Denver and Gulf Railway in Wheatland, Wyoming was built in 1895. It was a work of Charlie Goodrich. It was listed on the National Register of Historic Places in 1996 as the Wheatland Railroad Depot.
