= Wyoming Highway 314 =

State highway in Wyoming, United States

Wyoming Highway 314
- Slater Road
- WYO 314 highlighted in red

Route information
- Maintained by WYDOT
- Length: 8.57 mi (13.79 km)

Major junctions
- West end: I-25 / US 87
- WYO 315
- East end: Slater Road

Location
- Country: United States
- State: Wyoming
- Counties: Platte

Highway system
- Wyoming State Highway System; Interstate; US; State
← WYO 313	→ WYO 315

Wyoming Highway 314 (WYO 314) is an 8.57-mile-long (13.79 km) state highway in the southeastern part of Platte County, Wyoming, named Slater Road.

== Route description ==
Wyoming Highway 314 begins at its west end at I-25/US 87 (Exit 65) and travels east through Slater. WYO 314 intersects Wyoming Highway 315 at 6.56 miles (10.56 km). Two miles later, WYO 314 ends at an intersection with Buckskin Rd. at 8.57 miles (13.79 km). The roadway continues east as Slater Road.

== Major intersections ==
The entire route is in Slater, Platte County.

mi	km	Destinations	Notes
0.00	0.00	I-25 / US 87	Exit 65 on I-25
6.56	10.56	WYO 315	Southern terminus of WYO 315
8.57	13.79	Slater Road	Continuation beyond eastern terminus
1.000 mi = 1.609 km; 1.000 km = 0.621 mi
