= El Rancho, Wyoming =

- Census-designated place
- Location within Wyoming Location within the United States
- Coordinates: 42°16′05″N 105°02′52″W
- Country: United States
- State: Wyoming
- County: Platte

Area
  - Total: 0.58 sq mi (1.49 km^{2})
  - Land: 0.58 sq mi (1.49 km^{2})
  - Water: 0 sq mi (0.0 km^{2})
- Elevation: 4,870 ft (1,480 m)

Population (2020)
  - Total: 18
- Time zone: UTC-7 (Mountain (MST))
  - Summer (DST): UTC-6 (MDT)
- ZIP Code: 82201 (Wheatland)
- Area code: 307
- FIPS code: 55-24350
- GNIS feature ID: 2807540

El Rancho is an unincorporated area and census-designated place (CDP) in Platte County, Wyoming, United States. As of the 2020 census, it had a population of 18.

The community is in northern Platte County, on the west side of Interstate 25. Access is from Exit 94 (Wyoming Highway 319). Wheatland, the county seat, is 15 miles (24 km) to the south, and Glendo is 17 miles (27 km) to the north.
