= 1948 United States presidential election in Wyoming =

- November 2, 1948

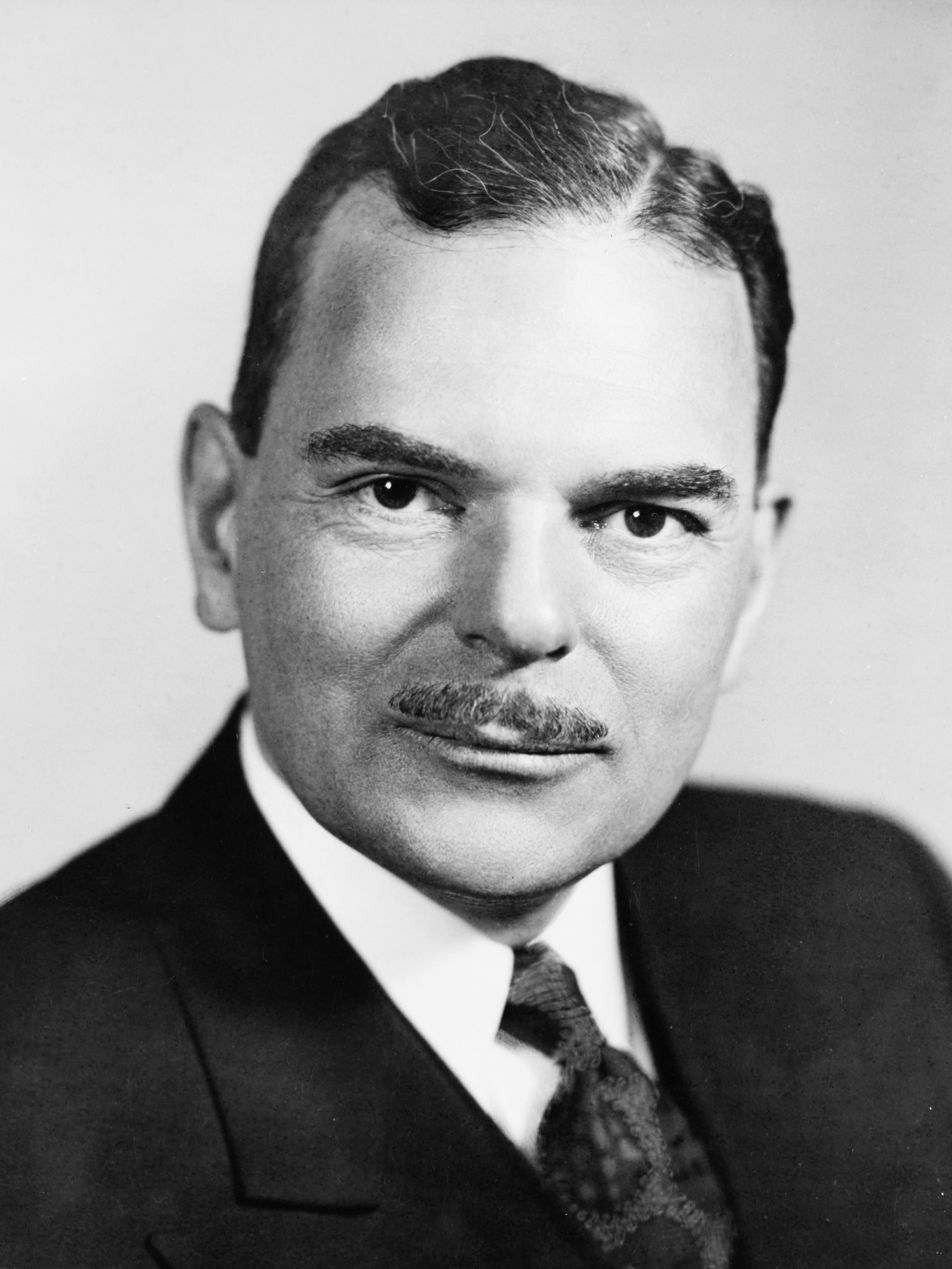
Nominee	Harry S. Truman	Thomas E. Dewey
Party	Democratic	Republican
Home state	Missouri	New York
Running mate	Alben W. Barkley	Earl Warren
Electoral vote	3	0
Popular vote	52,354	47,947
Percentage	51.62%	47.27%
County results
Truman
50–60%
60–70%
Dewey
50–60%
60–70%
President before election
Harry S. Truman
Democratic
Elected President
Harry S. Truman
Democratic

The 1948 United States presidential election in Wyoming took place on November 2, 1948, as part of the 1948 United States presidential election. State voters chose three representatives, or electors, to the Electoral College, who voted for president and vice president. Wyoming was won by incumbent Democratic President Harry S. Truman, running with Senate Majority Leader Alben W. Barkley, with 51.62 percent of the popular vote, against the Republican nominee, 47th Governor of New York Thomas E. Dewey, running with California Governor and future Chief Justice of the United States Earl Warren, with 47.27 percent of the popular vote, despite the fact that Dewey had previously won the state four years earlier.

Truman's upset victory in Wyoming was part of a major upset victory nationwide, as prior to the election, polls had forecasted a Dewey victory. Dewey ran a low risk campaign, largely avoiding criticizing Truman, which was due to many believing his hawkish campaign 4 years earlier had cost him the election to Truman's Democratic predecessor, Franklin D. Roosevelt. Truman suffered from low approval ratings and dealt with many southern Democratic voters defecting to the Dixiecrat candidate Strom Thurmond, costing him the traditionally Democratic strongholds of South Carolina, Alabama, Mississippi, and Louisiana, however Truman's unexpected strength in the Midwest and West Coast secured his reelection, as he flipped the states of Ohio, Iowa, Wisconsin, Colorado, and Wyoming, all of which had voted for Dewey in 1944. Dewey revived Republican strength in the traditionally Republican Northeast, flipping Delaware, Maryland, Pennsylvania, New Jersey, Connecticut, New Hampshire, and his home state of New York. He also managed to flip Michigan and Oregon.

Truman was popular among rural voters, and with agriculture being one of the biggest parts of Wyoming's economy, Truman's support for New Deal era programs that attempted to provide relief to farmers, which along with The Civilian Conservation Corps program greatly impacted Wyoming, allowing new National Parks to be built in the state, was popular among Wyoming voters, and he successfully painted Dewey as more conservative than he was, ignoring the fact that he was significantly more liberal and supportive of New Deal programs like Social Security than many of the conservative Congressional Republicans such as Senator Robert A. Taft from Ohio. Truman blamed the Republican-controlled Congress for his inability to pass legislation, which voters believed, and on election day, voters delivered Truman a landslide victory, and returned control of both chambers of Congress to the Democrats. This change was reflected in Wyoming, as the state's Class II Senate seat would flip into Democratic hands with Lester Hunt's landslide victory, who outperformed the top of the ticket by 9.9%. Truman flipped Platte and Natrona counties, outperforming Roosevelt's 1944 statewide result by 6.8%.

Dewey won the state in 1944 by a 2.46% margin, or 2,502 votes. However, in this election, Truman won the state, by 4.35%, or 4,407 votes. This was the last time a Democratic presidential candidate won the state until Lyndon B. Johnson in 1964, as throughout the 50s, the state transformed into a Republican stronghold. Since 1964, no Democratic presidential candidate has been able to reach 40% of the vote.

== Campaign ==
On May 3, 1948, the Wyoming Democratic Party voted to bound its twelve delegates to the Democratic National Convention to support Truman for president and Joseph C. O'Mahoney for vice-president. Archie Allison, Alice Spielman, and W.J. Smith were selected to serve as Republican presidential electors.

== Results ==
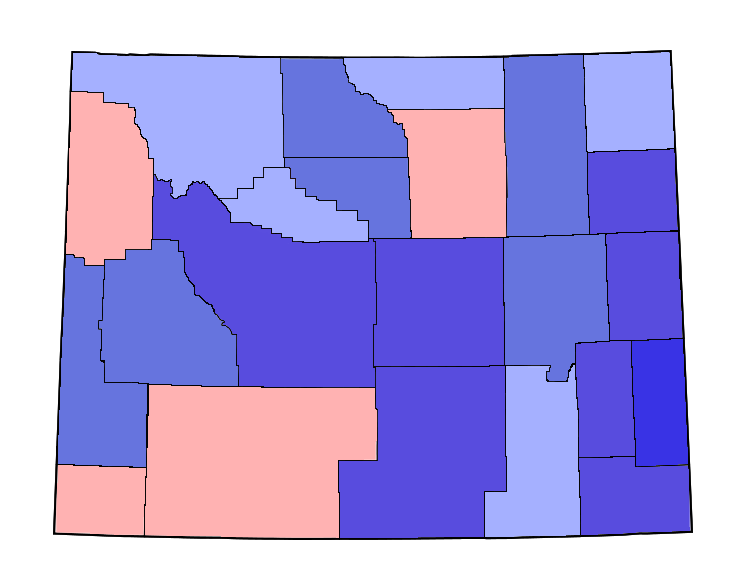
Trends by county from the 1944 election to the 1948 election Democratic +0-5 +5-10 +10-20 +20-25% Republican +1-5%

1948 United States presidential election in Wyoming
Party	Candidate	Votes	%
Democratic	Harry S. Truman (incumbent)	52,354	51.62%
Republican	Thomas E. Dewey	47,947	47.27%
Progressive	Henry A. Wallace	931	0.92%
Socialist	Norman Thomas	137	0.14%
Socialist Labor	Edward A. Teichert	56	0.06%
Total votes		101,425	100.00%

=== Results by county ===
County	Harry S. Truman Democratic		Thomas E. Dewey Republican		Henry A. Wallace Progressive		Norman Thomas Socialist		Edward Teichert Socialist Labor		Margin		Total votes cast
County	#	%	#	%	#	%	#	%	#	%	#	%	Total votes cast
Albany	3,141	51.96%	2,858	47.28%	30	0.50%	12	0.20%	4	0.07%	283	4.68%	6,045
Big Horn	2,370	49.14%	2,429	50.36%	20	0.41%	2	0.04%	2	0.04%	-59	-1.22%	4,823
Campbell	856	41.33%	1,201	57.99%	13	0.63%	1	0.05%	0	0.00%	-345	-16.66%	2,071
Carbon	3,439	59.16%	2,319	39.89%	55	0.95%	0	0.00%	0	0.00%	1,120	19.27%	5,813
Converse	996	42.60%	1,327	56.76%	11	0.47%	2	0.09%	2	0.09%	-331	-14.16%	2,338
Crook	712	37.63%	1,166	61.63%	9	0.48%	3	0.16%	2	0.11%	-454	-24.00%	1,892
Fremont	3,019	47.17%	3,357	52.45%	24	0.38%	0	0.00%	0	0.00%	-338	-5.28%	6,400
Goshen	1,843	47.15%	2,029	51.91%	34	0.87%	3	0.08%	0	0.00%	-186	-4.76%	3,909
Hot Springs	928	52.61%	791	44.84%	42	2.38%	2	0.11%	1	0.06%	137	7.77%	1,764
Johnson	682	33.35%	1,351	66.06%	7	0.34%	5	0.24%	0	0.00%	-669	-32.71%	2,045
Laramie	8,226	56.64%	6,200	42.69%	64	0.44%	26	0.18%	8	0.06%	2,026	13.95%	14,524
Lincoln	1,925	51.50%	1,730	46.28%	83	2.22%	0	0.00%	0	0.00%	195	5.22%	3,738
Natrona	6,183	53.26%	5,341	46.01%	62	0.53%	20	0.17%	2	0.02%	842	7.25%	11,608
Niobrara	753	43.15%	975	55.87%	12	0.69%	3	0.17%	2	0.11%	-222	-12.72%	1,745
Park	2,461	47.83%	2,655	51.60%	20	0.39%	6	0.12%	3	0.06%	-194	-3.77%	5,145
Platte	1,465	51.35%	1,366	47.88%	7	0.25%	13	0.46%	2	0.07%	99	3.47%	2,853
Sheridan	3,852	50.68%	3,698	48.65%	38	0.50%	12	0.16%	1	0.01%	154	2.03%	7,601
Sublette	496	44.05%	622	55.24%	6	0.53%	1	0.09%	1	0.09%	-126	-11.19%	1,126
Sweetwater	5,146	63.65%	2,538	31.39%	363	4.49%	18	0.22%	20	0.25%	2,608	32.26%	8,085
Teton	556	43.13%	719	55.78%	9	0.70%	2	0.16%	3	0.23%	-163	-12.65%	1,289
Uinta	1,632	56.31%	1,239	42.75%	19	0.66%	7	0.24%	1	0.03%	393	13.56%	2,898
Washakie	851	44.21%	1,074	55.79%	0	0.00%	0	0.00%	0	0.00%	-223	-11.58%	1,925
Weston	822	45.97%	962	53.80%	3	0.17%	1	0.06%	0	0.00%	-140	-7.83%	1,788
Totals	52,354	51.62%	47,947	47.27%	931	0.92%	137	0.14%	56	0.06%	4,407	4.35%	101,425

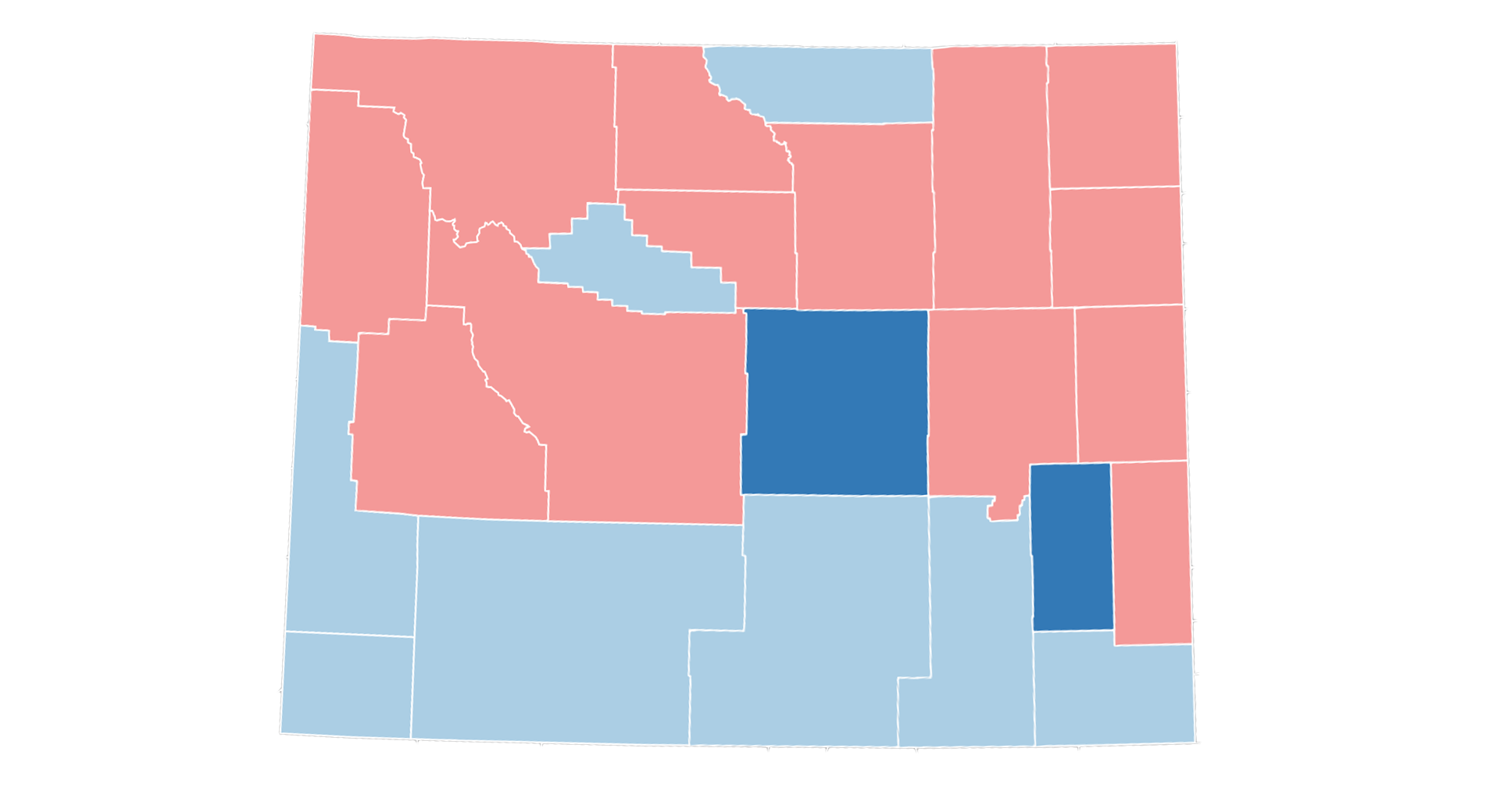
County flips from 1944: Democratic Hold Gain from Republican Republican Hold

==== Counties that flipped from Republican to Democratic ====
- Natrona
- Platte

== See also ==
- United States presidential elections in Wyoming
