= Platte County School District Number 1 =

School district in Wyoming, United States

Platte County School District #1 is a public school district based in Wheatland, Wyoming, United States.

== Geography ==
Platte County School District #1 serves most of Platte County as well as a portion of southwestern Goshen County, including the following communities:

- Incorporated places
  - Town of Chugwater
  - Town of Glendo
  - Town of Wheatland
- Census-designated places (Note: All census-designated places are unincorporated.)
  - Chugcreek
  - Lakeview North
  - Slater
  - Westview Circle
  - Y-O Ranch

== Schools ==
- Grades 9-12
  - Wheatland High School
- Grades 9-12
  - Peak High School (Alternative)
- Grades 6-8
  - Wheatland Middle School
- Grades 3-5
  - West Elementary
- Grades K-2
  - Libbey Elementary
- Grades K-12
  - Glendo School

== Student demographics ==
The following figures are as of October 1, 2008.

- Total District Enrollment: 1,089
- Student enrollment by gender
  - Male: 550 (50.51%)
  - Female: 539 (49.49%)
- Student enrollment by ethnicity
  - White (not Hispanic): 992 (91.09%)
  - Hispanic: 84 (7.71%)
  - Black (not Hispanic): 6 (0.55%)
  - Asian or Pacific Islander: 4 (0.37%)
  - American Indian or Alaskan Native: 3 (0.28%)

== See also ==
- List of school districts in Wyoming
