= Robert Mills Grant =

American politician (1926–2012)

Robert Mills "Bob" Grant

Wyoming State Representative for Platte County
- In office 1983–1992
- Preceded by: Douglas K. Bryant
- Succeeded by: Bill Stafford

Personal details
- Born: December 30, 1926 Cheyenne, Wyoming, U.S.
- Died: March 1, 2012 (aged 85) Cheyenne, Wyoming, U.S.
- Party: Republican
- Spouse(s): Betty Lou Watson Grant (m. 1945, divorced) Sue Anna McLean Conrad Grant (m. 1970; died 1987)
- Children: 3 biological, 3 stepchildren
- Occupation: Rancher

Robert Mills Grant, known as Bob Grant (December 30, 1926 – March 1, 2012), was a third-generation rancher from Platte County in southern Wyoming and from 1983 to 1992 a Republican member of the Wyoming House of Representatives.

== Background ==
Born in Cheyenne, Wyoming, Grant was a lifelong resident of nearby Wheatland, the only son among the three children born to Duncan Paul Grant and the former Mary Coquella (née Greenlee) on the then third-generation Grant Ranch in the Richeau Hills. Duncan Grant was a son of Robert Grant and the former Margaret Mitchell.

This part of Platte County was a near wilderness when the first Grants arrived. Early in the 20th century, Duncan and a brother had engaged in the hunting of wolves from the Nebraska line to as far west as Medicine Bow, Wyoming. They found that the predators usually traveled in packs of six or eight, but they had seen ferocious packs with twenty-two wolves, which aimed at yearling colts and calves for easy prey.

== Biography ==
As a child, Robert Mills Grant rode his horse, Snowball, to school on the nearby CMD Ranch on Richeau Creek. He later attended a school constructed on the Grant Ranch but completed high school in 1944 in Wheatland. With his parents, he ran a cow/calf operation on the then third-generation ranch. Established in 1884, the Grant Ranch is among the oldest continuous grazing operations in Wyoming.

Young Grant trailed cattle to Chugwater, loaded the livestock on the railroad, and rode with the herd east to the Union Stockyards in Omaha, Nebraska. He competed in calf and steer roping. After his marriage to the former Betty Lou Nation (1923-1971), Grant established their ranch residence by moving a bank building from Slater in Platte County to the family property and then renovating the structure into a house. He was a gold card member of the Professional Rodeo Cowboys Association. For sixteen years, he served on the Platte County Fair Board and for most of that time spearheaded a PRCA-approved rodeo along with the annual county fair.

In 1976, Grant lost his first race for a seat in the state House of Representatives to Democrat Douglas K. Bryant of Wheatland but was elected in 1982. He served five two-year terms in the House and bowed out in 1992 when Platte County was reduced to a single seat in the lower legislative chamber. Particularly known for issues related to livestock branding, Grant was chairman of the House Brand and Theft Committee and once declared, "Brand law in Wyoming is the best in the West."

For sixty years, Grant was a member of the influential Wyoming Stock Growers Association. Prior to 1980, Grant became a major shareholder in the First State Bank in Wheatland. He was affiliated with Moose International.

For much of his life, Grant slept in the same bed at his ranch that his Scottish grandfather Robert Grant had brought to Wyoming in the 19th century across the Atlantic Ocean and then through the Midwestern prairie. Over the years, Grant witnessed the strength of the Wyoming wind and saw it hurl gravel off ridges and into a friend's face like shrapnel. Ronald Lehr, representative of the trade association, the American Wind Energy Association, has described the Wyoming wind as "the best wind in North America, we think." As wind energy developers came calling early in the 21st century, Grant worked to form associations with his neighbors to make themselves financially viable in leasing their lands at the best price for the harnessing of the available wind energy.

== Death and legacy ==
Grant died of a brief illness at Cheyenne Regional Medical Center. Memorial services were held at the Wheatland 4-H Building.

The Robert Grant Reservoir near Ferguson Corner in Platte County is named in his honor. The Grant Ranch remains a pasture for grazing leaseholders. It was listed in 1995 on the National Register of Historic Places.

Political offices
Preceded by Douglas K. Bryant	Wyoming State Representative from Platte County; 1983–1992	Succeeded by Bill Stafford
