= Mary K. Schwope =

American politician (1917–2011

Member of the Wyoming House of Representatives from the Laramie district
- In office 1974–1975
- In office 1978–1991

Mary K. Schwope (July 21, 1917 – October 18, 2011) was an American Democratic politician from Cheyenne, Wyoming. She represented the Laramie district in the Wyoming House of Representatives, having been elected in 1974, 1978, 1980, 1982, 1984, 1986, 1988, and 1990.

Schwope was born Mary Kathryn Viox in Rock Springs, Wyoming on July 21, 1917. She died in Wheatland, Wyoming on October 18, 2011, at the age of 94.
