= Y-O Ranch, Wyoming =

- CDP
- Location in Platte County and the state of Wyoming
- Coordinates: 42°02′07″N 104°55′23″W
- Country: United States
- State: Wyoming
- County: Platte

Area
  - Total: 2.4 sq mi (6.3 km^{2})
  - Land: 2.4 sq mi (6.3 km^{2})
  - Water: 0 sq mi (0.0 km^{2})
- Elevation: 4,885 ft (1,489 m)

Population (2010)
  - Total: 195
  - Density: 80/sq mi (31/km^{2})
- Time zone: UTC-7 (Mountain (MST))
  - Summer (DST): UTC-6 (MDT)
- Area code: 307
- FIPS code: 56-86737
- GNIS feature ID: 2409636

Y-O Ranch is a census-designated place (CDP) in Platte County, Wyoming, United States. The population was 195 at the 2010 census.

== Geography ==
According to the United States Census Bureau, the CDP has a total area of 2.4 square miles (6.2 km^{2}), all land.

== Demographics ==
As of the census of 2000, there were 242 people, 83 households, and 66 families residing in the CDP. The population density was 99.3 people per square mile (38.3/km^{2}). There were 86 housing units at an average density of 35.3/sq mi (13.6/km^{2}). The racial makeup of the CDP was 96.69% White, 3.31% from other races. Hispanic or Latino of any race were 5.79% of the population.

There were 83 households, out of which 42.2% had children under the age of 18 living with them, 68.7% were married couples living together, 7.2% had a female householder with no husband present, and 19.3% were non-families. 14.5% of all households were made up of individuals, and 3.6% had someone living alone who was 65 years of age or older. The average household size was 2.92 and the average family size was 3.22.

In the CDP, the population was spread out, with 32.2% under the age of 18, 7.4% from 18 to 24, 33.1% from 25 to 44, 21.5% from 45 to 64, and 5.8% who were 65 years of age or older. The median age was 30 years. For every 100 females, there were 96.7 males. For every 100 females age 18 and over, there were 102.5 males.

The median income for a household in the CDP was $32,273, and the median income for a family was $30,795. Males had a median income of $23,750 versus $18,542 for females. The per capita income for the CDP was $12,188. About 13.6% of families and 19.3% of the population were below the poverty line, including 25.5% of those under the age of eighteen and none of those 65 or over.

== Education ==
Public education in the community of Y-O Ranch is provided by Platte County School District #1.
