= Wheatland High School (Wyoming) =

High school in Wyoming, United States

Coordinates: 42.0599°N 104.9576°W

Location
- 1207 13th Street; Wheatland, (Platte County), Wyoming 82201; United States

Information
- Type: Public high school
- School district: Platte County School District Number 1
- Principal: Josh Sandlian
- Staff: 21.64 (FTE)
- Enrollment: 258 (2024-2025)
- Student to teacher ratio: 11.92
- Colors: Blue and gold
- Nickname: Bulldogs
- Website: www.platte1.org

Wheatland High School is a secondary education school in Platte County School District Number 1 in Wheatland, Wyoming.

Their mascot is the bulldog. The school colors are blue, gold, and white. They have a wrestling, basketball, football, volleyball, softball, track, golf, cross country, marching band and cheer teams. They also have a drama program, academic decathlon and much more.
