= 1944 United States presidential election in Wyoming =

- November 7, 1944

| Nominee | Thomas E. Dewey | Franklin D. Roosevelt |
| Party | Republican | Democratic |
| Home state | New York | New York |
| Running mate | John W. Bricker | Harry S. Truman |
| Electoral vote | 3 | 0 |
| Popular vote | 51,921 | 49,419 |
| Percentage | 51.23% | 48.77% |
County results
Dewey
50–60%
60–70%
Roosevelt
50–60%
60–70%
President before election
Franklin D. Roosevelt
Democratic
Elected President
Franklin D. Roosevelt
Democratic

The 1944 United States presidential election in Wyoming took place on November 7, 1944, as part of the 1944 United States presidential election. State voters chose three representatives, or electors, to the Electoral College, who voted for president and vice president.

Wyoming was won by the Republican nominee, Governor of New York Thomas Dewey, running with Governor of Ohio John W. Bricker, by a 2.5% margin of victory, with 51.23 percent of the popular vote against incumbent Democratic President Franklin D. Roosevelt, running with Missouri Senator Harry S. Truman, with 48.77 percent of the popular vote, becoming the first Republican to win Wyoming since Herbert Hoover in 1928, sixteen years earlier.

This election was conducted in the midst of The Second World War, which was going well for America and the Allied Powers, Dewey campaigned against The New Deal, arguing in support of a smaller government and repealing many of the wartime regulations on the economy, as the end of the war appeared in sight. Roosevelt, now running for an unprecedented 4th term, faced allegations of poor health, which he would attempt to dispel by campaigning vigorously across the country, especially in the last month of the campaign, in October. Though many were weary of Roosevelt's long tenure, as Americans were used to Presidents only seeking two terms, Roosevelt's longstanding popularity would prove too difficult to overcome, and major American victories in Europe and the Pacific, such as The Liberation of Paris in France, and the Battle of Leyte Gulf in the Philippines gave Americans little to no reason to switch leadership in this election, and made Roosevelt unbeatable, with him leading Dewey in all pre-election polls.

Though voters nationwide would prefer Roosevelt over Dewey, voters in Wyoming, despite the fact that they had voted for Roosevelt by 6 points just 4 years ago in 1940, choose Dewey over Roosevelt, a sign of the conservative bastion that the state would become in future elections; indeed, Wyoming has only voted for the Democratic nominee twice since then, in 1948 and 1964. Dewey flipped 4 counties that Roosevelt won in 1940; Teton, Natrona, Park, and Platte. Additionally, he significantly closed the gaps in the rest of Wyoming's counties, losing the bellwether county of Albany by just 4.2%, compared to Wendell Willkie who had lost it by 18.5%, losing Sheridan by just 0.8% compared to Willkie's 7.5% loss, Laramie by 1.5% versus Willkie's 13.4% margin, Hot Springs and Carbon counties by 5% versus Willkie's 16.1% and 8.7% losses, respectively. Though his margin was narrow, and the state would remain a tossup in the next cycle, Wyoming's growing Republican trend was evidenced not only by Dewey being the first Republican to win it since 1928, but by Republican success in the 1942 midterm elections, when Republicans gained control of the state's Class II Senate seat and lone House seat.

This marked the first time since Grover Cleveland in 1892 that a Democrat won the presidency without carrying Wyoming. Despite his victory in this election, Dewey would go on to lose the state to Harry Truman in 1948, when he lost in an upset. This would be the last time until 1992 that a Republican would win Wyoming without getting 70% of the vote in at least one county. Wyoming weighed in as 10 points more Republican than the rest of the nation in this election.

== Results ==
1944 United States presidential election in Wyoming
| Party | Candidate | Votes | % |
|---|---|---|---|
| Republican | Thomas E. Dewey | 51,921 | 51.23% |
| Democratic | Franklin D. Roosevelt (incumbent) | 49,419 | 48.77% |
| Total votes | | 101,340 | 100.00% |

=== Results by county ===
| County | Thomas E. Dewey Republican | | Franklin D. Roosevelt Democratic | | Margin | | Total votes cast |
| County | # | % | # | % | # | % | Total votes cast |
|---|---|---|---|---|---|---|---|
| Albany | 2,970 | 47.91% | 3,229 | 52.09% | -259 | -4.18% | 6,199 |
| Big Horn | 2,659 | 53.47% | 2,314 | 46.53% | 345 | 6.94% | 4,973 |
| Campbell | 1,514 | 62.87% | 894 | 37.13% | 620 | 25.74% | 2,408 |
| Carbon | 2,698 | 47.49% | 2,983 | 52.51% | -285 | -5.02% | 5,681 |
| Converse | 1,601 | 62.05% | 979 | 37.95% | 622 | 24.10% | 2,580 |
| Crook | 1,244 | 64.32% | 690 | 35.68% | 554 | 28.64% | 1,934 |
| Fremont | 3,193 | 59.46% | 2,177 | 40.54% | 1,016 | 18.92% | 5,370 |
| Goshen | 2,674 | 63.85% | 1,514 | 36.15% | 1,160 | 27.70% | 4,188 |
| Hot Springs | 877 | 47.51% | 969 | 52.49% | -92 | -4.98% | 1,846 |
| Johnson | 1,384 | 64.67% | 756 | 35.33% | 628 | 29.34% | 2,140 |
| Laramie | 7,326 | 49.27% | 7,542 | 50.73% | -216 | -1.46% | 14,868 |
| Lincoln | 1,649 | 43.52% | 2,140 | 56.48% | -491 | -12.96% | 3,789 |
| Natrona | 5,196 | 51.52% | 4,890 | 48.48% | 306 | 3.04% | 10,086 |
| Niobrara | 1,312 | 61.37% | 826 | 38.63% | 486 | 22.74% | 2,138 |
| Park | 2,571 | 53.25% | 2,257 | 46.75% | 314 | 6.50% | 4,828 |
| Platte | 1,776 | 53.49% | 1,544 | 46.51% | 232 | 6.98% | 3,320 |
| Sheridan | 3,802 | 49.61% | 3,862 | 50.39% | -60 | -0.78% | 7,664 |
| Sublette | 683 | 59.24% | 470 | 40.76% | 213 | 18.48% | 1,153 |
| Sweetwater | 2,623 | 31.90% | 5,599 | 68.10% | -2,976 | -36.20% | 8,222 |
| Teton | 637 | 56.07% | 499 | 43.93% | 138 | 12.14% | 1,136 |
| Uinta | 1,305 | 42.66% | 1,754 | 57.34% | -449 | -14.68% | 3,059 |
| Washakie | 1,130 | 59.26% | 777 | 40.74% | 353 | 18.52% | 1,907 |
| Weston | 1,097 | 59.27% | 754 | 40.73% | 343 | 18.54% | 1,851 |
| Totals | 51,921 | 51.23% | 49,419 | 48.77% | 2,502 | 2.46% | 101,340 |

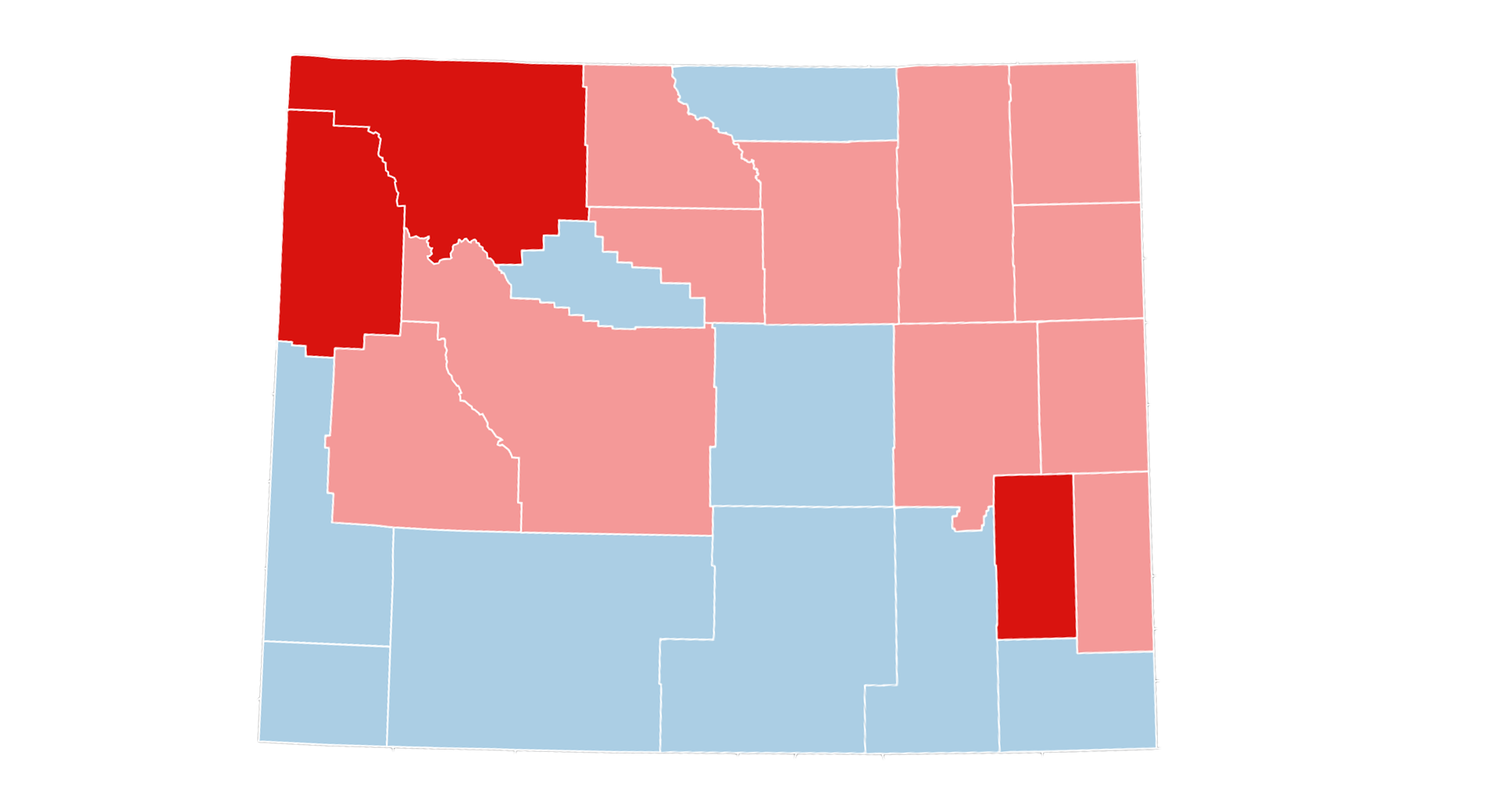
County flips from 1940: Democratic Hold Republican Hold Gain from Democratic

==== Counties that flipped from Democratic to Republican ====
- Natrona
- Park
- Platte
- Teton

== See also ==
- United States presidential elections in Wyoming
