= Phifer Airfield =

- IATA: EAN; ICAO: KEAN; FAA LID: EAN

Summary
- Airport type: Public
- Owner: Town of Wheatland
- Serves: Wheatland, Wyoming
- Elevation AMSL: 4,779.3 ft / 1,456.7 m
- Coordinates: 42°03′19.8710″N 104°55′41.8190″W
- Interactive map of Phifer Airfield

Runways
Direction	Length		Surface
Direction	ft	m	Surface
8/26	5,900	1,798	Asphalt
- Source: Federal Aviation Administration

Phifer Airfield (IATA: EAN, ICAO: EAN, FAA LID: KEAN) is a public-use airport located in Wheatland, Wyoming, approximately 1 mi (1.6 km) east of the town. The National Plan of Integrated Airport Systems for 2011–2015 categorized it as a general aviation facility.

== Facilities ==
The airport is located at an elevation of approximately 4,779.3 feet (roughly 1456.7 meters). It has one runway: 8/26, which is 5900 x 75 ft. (1798 x 23 m). The airport has no control tower.
