= Lakeview North, Wyoming =

- CDP
- Location in Platte County and the state of Wyoming
- Coordinates: 42°05′49″N 104°57′31″W
- Country: United States
- State: Wyoming
- County: Platte

Area
  - Total: 0.85 sq mi (2.2 km^{2})
  - Land: 0.85 sq mi (2.2 km^{2})
  - Water: 0 sq mi (0.0 km^{2})

Population (2010)
  - Total: 84
  - Density: 99/sq mi (38/km^{2})
- Time zone: UTC-7 (Mountain (MST))
  - Summer (DST): UTC-6 (MDT)
- Area code: 307
- FIPS code: 56-44252
- GNIS feature ID: 2408566

Lakeview North is a census-designated place (CDP) in Platte County, Wyoming, United States. The population was 84 at the 2010 census.

== Geography ==
According to the United States Census Bureau, the CDP has a total area of 0.9 square miles (2.2 km^{2}), all land.

== Demographics ==
As of the census of 2000, there were 77 people, 32 households, and 23 families residing in the CDP.(update needed) The population density was 89.3 people per square mile (34.6/km^{2}). There were 34 housing units at an average density of 39.5/sq mi (15.3/km^{2}). The racial makeup of the CDP was 97.40% White, and 2.60% from two or more races.

There were 32 households, out of which 37.5% had children under the age of 18 living with them, 68.8% were married couples living together, 3.1% had a female householder with no husband present, and 28.1% were non-families. 25.0% of all households were made up of individuals, and 9.4% had someone living alone who was 65 years of age or older. The average household size was 2.41 and the average family size was 2.91.

In the CDP, the population was spread out, with 26.0% under the age of 18, 2.6% from 18 to 24, 31.2% from 25 to 44, 35.1% from 45 to 64, and 5.2% who were 65 years of age or older. The median age was 43 years. For every 100 females, there were 92.5 males. For every 100 females age 18 and over, there were 96.6 males.

The median income for a household in the CDP was $51,042, and the median income for a family was $51,458. Males had a median income of $51,250 versus $26,250 for females. The per capita income for the CDP was $20,245. There were no families and 13.6% of the population living below the poverty line, including no under eighteens and none of those over 64.

== Education ==
Public education in the community of Lakeview North is provided by Platte County School District #1.
