= Chugwater, Wyoming =

- Town
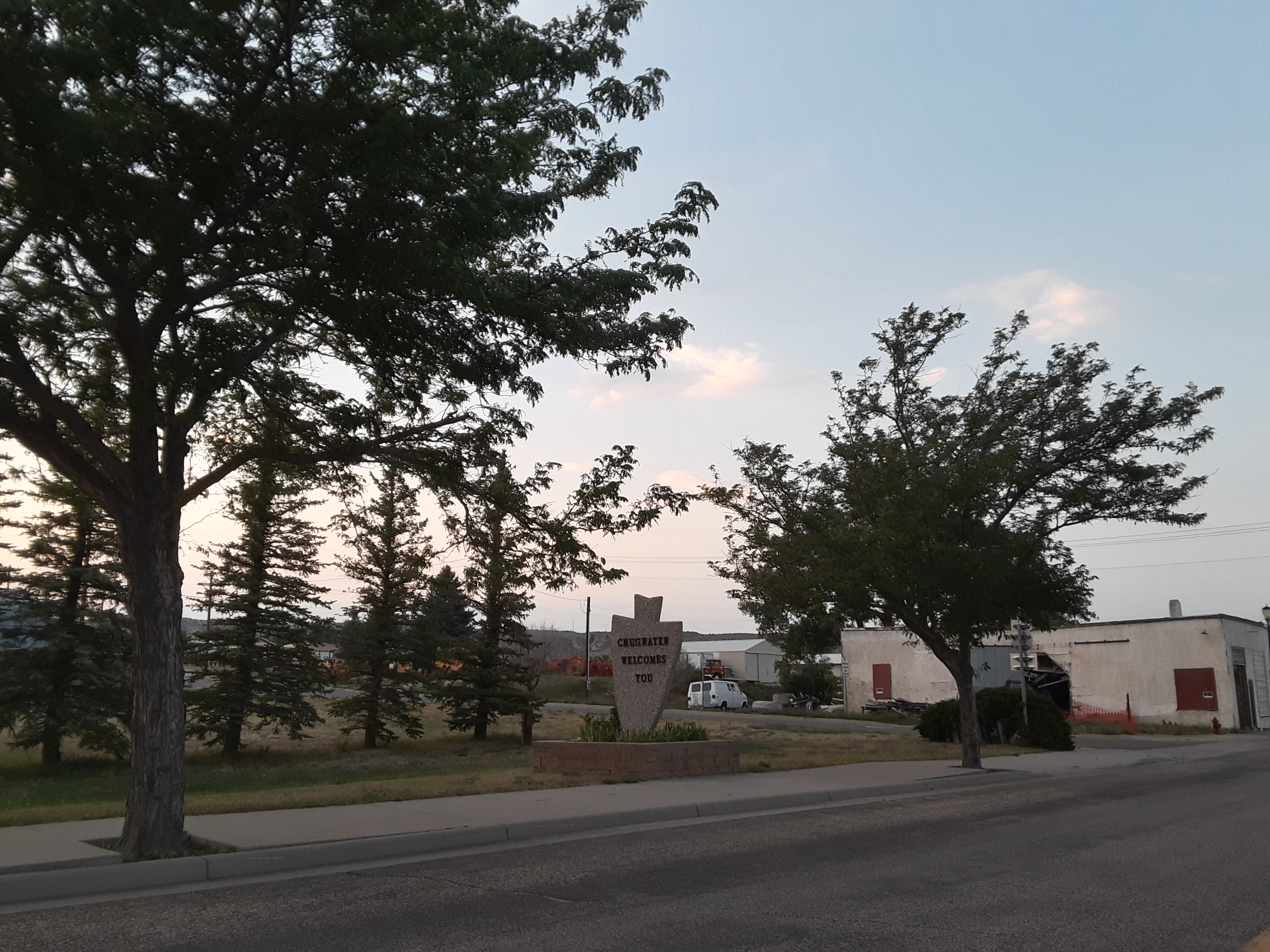
- Chugwater welcome sign

- Location of Chugwater in Platte County, Wyoming
- Coordinates: 41°45′05″N 104°49′44″W
- Country: United States
- State: Wyoming
- County: Platte

Area
  - Total: 3.06 sq mi (7.93 km^{2})
  - Land: 3.06 sq mi (7.93 km^{2})
  - Water: 0 sq mi (0.00 km^{2})
- Elevation: 5,295 ft (1,614 m)

Population (2020)
  - Total: 175
  - Density: 65.7/sq mi (25.36/km^{2})
- Time zone: UTC−7 (Mountain (MST))
  - Summer (DST): UTC−6 (MDT)
- ZIP code: 82210
- Area code: 307
- FIPS code: 56-14165
- GNIS feature ID: 2413202
- Website: http://www.chugwater.com/

Chugwater is a town in Platte County, Wyoming, United States. As of the 2020 census, the town population was 175. The High Plains town is located 45 miles north of Cheyenne and 25 miles south of Wheatland.

== History ==
The Chugwater area, with its proximity to Fort Laramie, was visited by some of the earliest Western expeditions, including that of Stephen Watts Kearny in 1845, and cattle were first wintered in the valley as early as 1859.

=== Early expeditions to the Valley ===
In 1870, the Hayden Expedition passed through what they referred to as "the valley of the Chug". Along on the expedition was famed Hudson River School painter, Sanford Robinson Gifford (1823-1880), who sketched Chugwater Bluff, and later completed a large painting of it entitled "Valley of the Chugwater". Hayden's photographer, William Henry Jackson, noted in his journal that the Chugwater area was a wintering area for cattle: "A very conspicuous feature which we notice in descending the valley of the Chug is the high bluff of Lower Cretaceous sandstone, which stretches away toward the northeast like a hugh wall. the jointage is so regular that it presents the appearance of massive mason-work gradually falling to decay. The sides of these sandstone walls are from 40 to 60 feet perpendicular, sometimes overhanging, large masses of which have broken off and fallen to the base. Their most striking feature, however is to weather into most picturesque castlllated forms. The valley of the Chug is 100 miles long, and is a favorite place to winter stock."

=== First settlers and the coming of the railroad ===
The first settler in the valley is reported to have been James Bordeaux (1814-1878), who opened a general store in 1868, located at the crossroads where the road from Cheyenne forks into the roads leading to Fort Fetterman and to Fort Laramie. In 1884, the Swan Land and Cattle Co. was established, and in 1886, the Cheyenne and Northern Railway was chartered to serve points north of Cheyenne in Wyoming. It was as a result primarily of the Swan Land and Cattle Co., and the railroad, that the town of Chugwater grew up.

=== Establishment of the town ===
The town of Chugwater was surveyed and laid out by engineers for the Swan Land and Cattle Co. in 1886. The town grew slowly, but in 1904 a Masonic Hall was constructed, and the Grant Hotel opened in 1912. After the drought in the early 20th century, many of the early settlers left the area, but a number stayed, and by 1919 the town was incorporated.

As late as the 1940s, Chugwater was still a railroad stop where cattle were loaded for shipment east to the Union Stockyards in Omaha, Nebraska.

Clayton Danks, the model for the rider on the Wyoming Bucking Horse and Rider state symbol, worked on the 2-Bar Ranch near Chugwater early in the 20th century. The bucking horse on the logo, that he rode at the Cheyenne Frontier Days rodeo in 1909, was Steamboat, who was foaled at Chugwater in 1896.

State Representative Robert Mills Grant was among those who have drove cattle into Chugwater.

The former Speaker of the Wyoming House of Representatives, Harold Hellbaum, farmed and ranched in Chugwater. He served in the state legislature from 1963 to 1977, with his last term as Speaker.

=== Etymology of the town's name ===
Some historians hold that the name "Chugwater" is derived from a Mandan account of a bison hunt. According to this narrative, a chief was disabled during the hunt and his son took charge of the hunt or "buffalo jump". Under his direction, hunters drove the bison over nearby cliffs; when the animals reached the ground below, a sound of "chugging" was heard by the hunters. The story concludes with an etymology: since a stream was near the base of the cliffs, the site of the stampede has been called "the place" or "water at the place where the buffalo chug."

=== The Chugwater horse called "Steamboat" ===
The iconic black horse named "Steamboat", who was the model for the bucking horse and rider motif on Wyoming license plates, came from the Tyrrell ranch located near Chugwater, and was given to the Cheyenne Frontier Days organization by the ranch's general chairman, Ace V. Tyrrell. As a young horse, Steamboat sustained a nose injury, requiring removal of a bone fragment from a nostril, and as a result, developed a sound resembling the whistling of a steamboat whenever he bucked.

Steamboat was first ridden at a Frontier Days rodeo in 1909, by Clayton Danks (1879 – 1970) who was then working as a ranch hand in the Chugwater area, and was stabled for many years south of Chugwater near Cheyenne, in an historic barn owned and maintained by Mike and Linda Holst. The Wyoming license plate logo, showing Steamboat being ridden by Danks, is the longest-running license plate motif in the world.

The famous horse died in 1914, and is buried in Frontier Park in Cheyenne near bucking chute number 9, the only horse to be so honored with interment on park grounds. In 1975, Steamboat was inducted into the National Cowboy Hall of Fame in Oklahoma City, and in 1979, into the Pro Rodeo Hall of Fame in Colorado Springs. Steamboat and Danks are also on the logo for the University of Wyoming, and on the Wyoming state quarter.

== Geography and climate ==
According to the United States Census Bureau, the town has a total area of 3.06 square miles (7.93 km^{2}), all land.

Climate data for Chugwater, Wyoming (1991–2020 normals, extremes 1900–2019)
Month	Jan	Feb	Mar	Apr	May	Jun	Jul	Aug	Sep	Oct	Nov	Dec	Year
Record high °F (°C)	73 (23)	76 (24)	80 (27)	87 (31)	94 (34)	104 (40)	110 (43)	101 (38)	98 (37)	89 (32)	77 (25)	73 (23)	110 (43)
Mean maximum °F (°C)	59.4 (15.2)	61.8 (16.6)	69.9 (21.1)	77.7 (25.4)	85.8 (29.9)	92.7 (33.7)	97.5 (36.4)	95.1 (35.1)	90.1 (32.3)	80.5 (26.9)	69.9 (21.1)	58.9 (14.9)	97.9 (36.6)
Mean daily maximum °F (°C)	41.2 (5.1)	42.4 (5.8)	51.4 (10.8)	58.0 (14.4)	67.6 (19.8)	79.6 (26.4)	87.7 (30.9)	85.8 (29.9)	76.9 (24.9)	62.4 (16.9)	50.1 (10.1)	41.0 (5.0)	62.0 (16.7)
Daily mean °F (°C)	29.7 (−1.3)	29.9 (−1.2)	37.7 (3.2)	44.2 (6.8)	53.6 (12.0)	63.9 (17.7)	71.3 (21.8)	69.4 (20.8)	60.4 (15.8)	47.2 (8.4)	37.2 (2.9)	29.4 (−1.4)	47.8 (8.8)
Mean daily minimum °F (°C)	18.2 (−7.7)	17.4 (−8.1)	24.1 (−4.4)	30.3 (−0.9)	39.5 (4.2)	48.3 (9.1)	55.0 (12.8)	53.0 (11.7)	43.8 (6.6)	31.9 (−0.1)	24.3 (−4.3)	17.7 (−7.9)	33.6 (0.9)
Mean minimum °F (°C)	−9.0 (−22.8)	−8.2 (−22.3)	2.2 (−16.6)	13.5 (−10.3)	24.6 (−4.1)	34.5 (1.4)	42.7 (5.9)	41.3 (5.2)	26.6 (−3.0)	12.5 (−10.8)	0.7 (−17.4)	−10.7 (−23.7)	−20.1 (−28.9)
Record low °F (°C)	−37 (−38)	−37 (−38)	−29 (−34)	−16 (−27)	10 (−12)	21 (−6)	29 (−2)	21 (−6)	6 (−14)	−16 (−27)	−26 (−32)	−45 (−43)	−45 (−43)
Average precipitation inches (mm)	0.49 (12)	0.73 (19)	1.14 (29)	2.07 (53)	3.07 (78)	2.08 (53)	1.59 (40)	1.57 (40)	1.30 (33)	1.27 (32)	0.74 (19)	0.74 (19)	16.79 (426)
Average snowfall inches (cm)	9.0 (23)	11.4 (29)	11.1 (28)	8.9 (23)	2.1 (5.3)	0.0 (0.0)	0.0 (0.0)	0.0 (0.0)	1.0 (2.5)	5.2 (13)	9.1 (23)	12.0 (30)	69.8 (177)
Average precipitation days (≥ 0.01 in)	6.2	6.7	6.8	9.1	11.3	9.1	8.3	8.3	6.9	6.4	5.7	6.4	91.2
Average snowy days (≥ 0.1 in)	6.0	6.6	5.7	4.4	1.0	0.0	0.0	0.0	0.4	2.2	5.0	6.3	37.6
Source: NOAA (mean maxima/minima 1981–2010)

=== Highways ===
- I-25 - north–south Interstate from New Mexico to Wyoming; runs north–south through Chugwater, concurrent with US 87.
- I-25 BL - Alternate Interstate Business Route through Chugwater.
- US 87 - north–south route through Chugwater, concurrent with I-25.
- WYO 211 (Iron Mountain Rd)
- WYO 313 (Lone Tree Rd)

== Demographics ==
Historical population
Census	Pop.	Note	%±
1930	286		—
1940	245		−14.3%
1950	283		15.5%
1960	207		−26.9%
1970	187		−9.7%
1980	282		50.8%
1990	192		−31.9%
2000	244		27.1%
2010	212		−13.1%
2020	175		−17.5%
U.S. Decennial Census

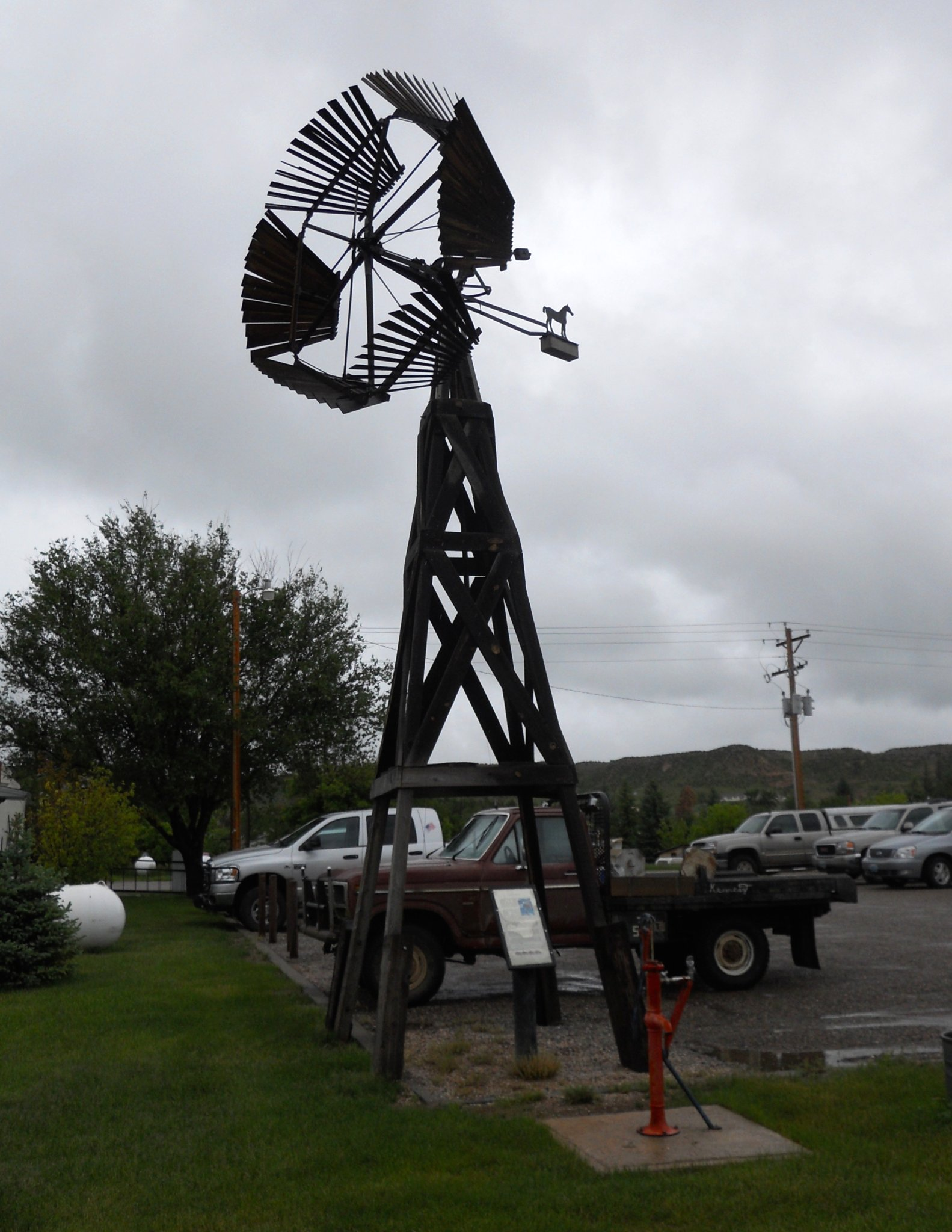
Chugwater's Legacy Windmill, an unusual vaneless model built circa 1910. Restored for Wyoming's Centennial Celebration, 1991.

=== 2020 census ===
As of the census of 2020, there were 175 people and 111 households in the town. The population density was 57.2 inhabitants per square mile (22.1/km^{2}). There were 101 housing units at an average density of 33.0 per square mile (12.7/km^{2}). The racial makeup of the town was 89.8% White, 0.5% from other races, and 3.8% from two or more races. Hispanic or Latino of any race made up 5.9% of the population. The town did not have any Asian, African American, or Native American residents.

There were 111 households, of which 73.9% were married couples living together, 17.1% had a female householder with no husband present, and 9.0% had a male householder with no wife present. The average family size was 1.74.

The median age in the town was 69.9 years. 10.8% of residents were under the age of 20; 4.4% were between the ages of 18 and 24; 4.2% were from 25 to 44; 19.9% were from 45 to 64; and 60.7% were 65 years of age or older. The gender makeup of the town was 55.4% male and 44.6% female.

The median income for a household in the town was $57,934. Only 1.1% of the population fell below the poverty line, all of whom were above the age of 65 years.

=== 2010 census ===
As of the census of 2010, there were 212 people, 93 households, and 60 families residing in the town. The population density was 69.3 inhabitants per square mile (26.8/km^{2}). There were 106 housing units at an average density of 34.6 per square mile (13.4/km^{2}). The racial makeup of the town was 97.2% White, 0.5% African American, 0.9% Native American, 0.5% from other races, and 0.9% from two or more races. Hispanic or Latino of any race accounted for 5.7% of the population.

There were 93 households, of which 25.8% had children under the age of 18 living with them, 48.4% were married couples living together, 10.8% had a female householder with no husband present, 5.4% had a male householder with no wife present, and 35.5% were non-families. 34.4% of all households were made up of individuals, and 12.9% had someone living alone who was 65 years of age or older. The average household size was 2.28 and the average family size was 2.90.

The median age in the town was 48.3 years. 25% of residents were under the age of 18; 3.8% were between the ages of 18 and 24; 17% were from 25 to 44; 34% were from 45 to 64; and 20.3% were 65 years of age or older. The gender makeup of the town was 51.9% male and 48.1% female.

=== 2000 census ===
As of the census of 2000, there were 244 people, 94 households, and 64 families residing in the town. The population density was 80.0 people per square mile (30.9/km^{2}). There were 120 housing units at an average density of 39.3 per square mile (15.2/km^{2}). The racial makeup of the town was 95.90% White, 0.41% Native American, 0.82% from other races, and 2.87% from two or more races. Hispanic or Latino of any race were 4.92% of the population and not a single African American in the town.

There were 94 households, out of which 33.0% had children under the age of 18 living with them, 55.3% were married couples living together, 8.5% had a female householder with no husband present, and 30.9% were non-families. 26.6% of all households were made up of individuals, and 16.0% had someone living alone who was 65 years of age or older. The average household size was 2.60 and the average family size was 3.18.

In the town, the population was spread out, with 29.9% under the age of 18, 10.2% from 18 to 24, 21.7% from 25 to 44, 20.9% from 45 to 64, and 17.2% who were 65 years of age or older. The median age was 34 years. For every 100 females, there were 110.3 males. For every 100 females age 18 and over, there were 111.1 males.

The median income for a household in the town was $23,750, and the median income for a family was $26,250. Males had a median income of $24,688 versus $17,917 for females. The per capita income for the town was $10,609. About 27.9% of families and 30.3% of the population were below the poverty line, including 38.5% of those under the age of eighteen and 28.6% of those 65 or over.

== Education ==
Public education in the town of Chugwater is provided by Platte County School District #1 in Wheatland. There is also a Charter school in Chugwater called Prairie View Community School. Chugwater has a public library, a branch of the Platte County Public Library System.

== Economy ==
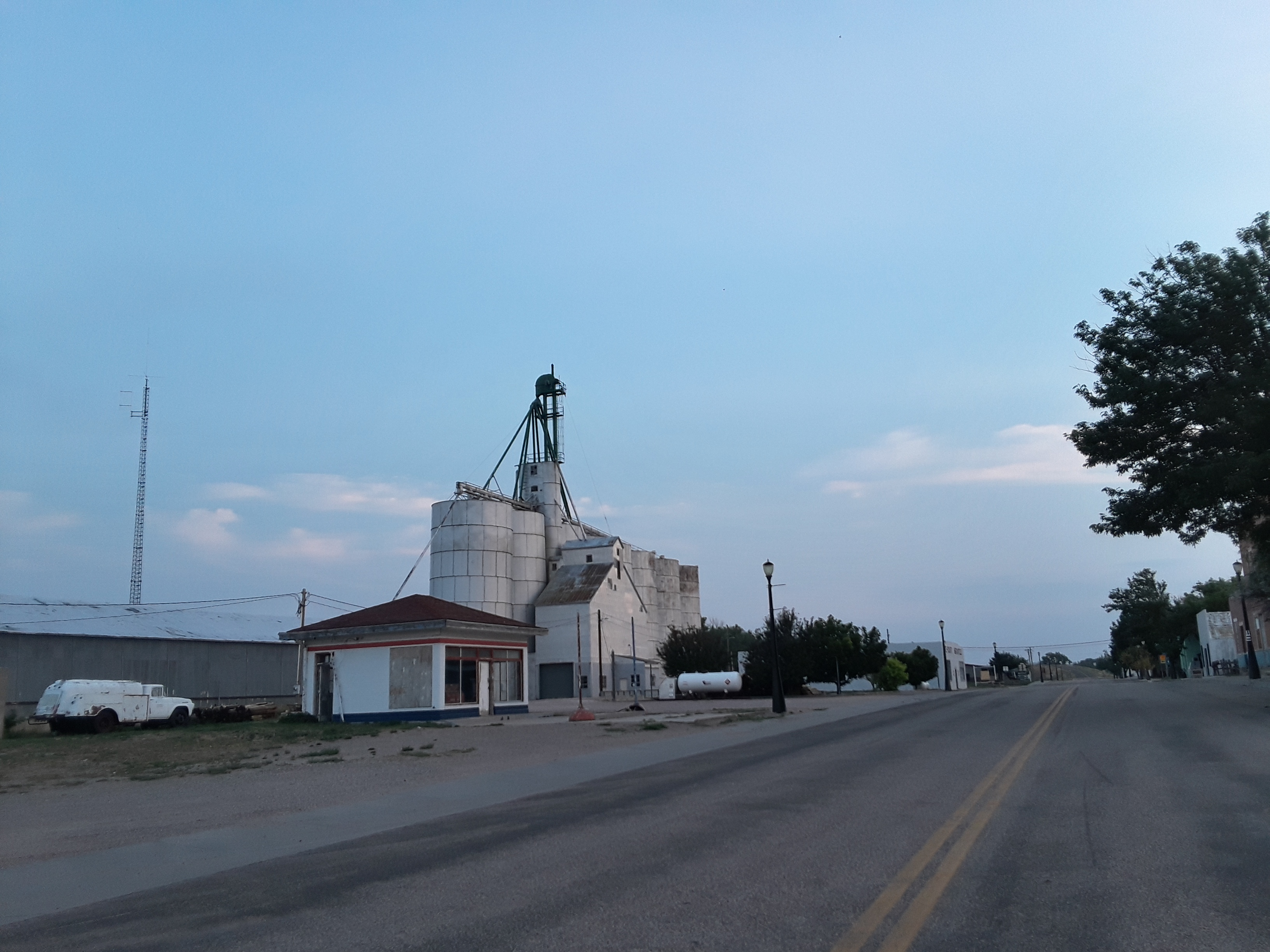
Grain elevator in Chugwater

In 2005, a promotion to attract new residents to the town offered building lots for $100, provided the new owner built a house within a year, and lived on the property for at least two years. Four lots were sold.

Chugwater lost its only grocery and gas station when an SUV crashed into Horton's Corner on December 30, 2012, resulting in a fire that burned the convenience store. The loss of the convenience store has forced residents to drive to Wheatland, or to Cheyenne, to buy basic necessities, such as groceries. The town also has erected electronic highway signs on Interstate 25 to inform motorists that gas can not be purchased in Chugwater, yet drivers still stop in the town to fill up based on inaccurate GPS information.

As of the summer of 2017, drivers can purchase fuel from unattended fuel islands 24/7 or check out the convenience store during business hours.

Chugwater Chili, a local brand started in 1986 which employs 15 people, lost a major seller of its packets of chili mix with the closure of Horton's Corner.

The Chugwater Soda Fountain is the oldest operating soda fountain in Wyoming.

=== Area attractions ===
The Diamond Ranch, established near Chugwater in 1878 by George Rainsford, was placed on the National Register of Historic Places on September 28, 1984. Unfortunately, it no longer functions as a guest ranch.

== Notable people ==
- Clayton Danks (1879–1970), Cheyenne Frontier Days rodeo rider, cowboy and ranch hand
- Robert Mills Grant (1926–2012), Wyoming State Representative
- Ted Prior (actor) (born 1959), actor who portrayed Mike Danton in the biographical film Deadly Prey

== See also ==
- Chugwater Formation
- List of municipalities in Wyoming
