= Uva, Wyoming =

- Unincorporated community
- Location within Wyoming
- Coordinates: 42°07′55″N 104°55′11″W
- Country: United States
- State: Wyoming
- County: Platte
- Elevation: 4,475 ft (1,364 m)
- Time zone: UTC-7 (Mountain (MST))
  - Summer (DST): UTC-6 (MDT)
- Area code: 307
- GNIS feature ID: 1595893

Uva is an unincorporated community in Platte County, Wyoming, United States.

== Notable person ==
- Joe Chasteen, Wyoming legislator, was born in Uva.
