= Joe Chasteen =

American politician (1925–2021)

Member of the Wyoming House of Representatives
- In office 1973–1977

Personal details
- Born: June 8, 1925 Uva, Wyoming, U.S.
- Died: August 17, 2021 (aged 96) Cheyenne, Wyoming, U.S.
- Party: Republican
- Occupation: insurance, businessman

Joe L. Chasteen (June 8, 1925 – August 17, 2021) was an American politician in the state of Wyoming. He served in the Wyoming House of Representatives as a member of the Republican Party. He attended Chadron State College and the University of Wyoming and was an insurance salesman and businessman.
