= Clayton Danks =

Clarence Clayton Danks
- Born: July 21, 1879; O'Neill, Nebraska, United States
- Died: June 23, 1970; Thermopolis, Wyoming, United States
- Resting place: Mount Hope Cemetery in Lander, Wyoming
- Occupations: Rodeo performer; Rancher; Law enforcement officer
- Spouse: Marie Fitzer Danks
- Children: One child

Notes
- The inspiration for the Wyoming Bucking Horse and Rider based on his 1909 riding of the horse Steamboat at the Cheyenne Frontier Days rodeo

Clarence Clayton Danks (July 21, 1879 – June 23, 1970) was a three-time winner of Cheyenne Frontier Days, an outdoor rodeo and western celebration held each July in the Wyoming capital city of Cheyenne. He is believed to be the cowboy of the widely-recognized Wyoming state trademark, the Bucking Horse and Rider.

== Background ==
The son of John Danks (1844–1922) and the former Sarah Gregg (1845–1921), Danks was born in O'Neill in Holt County in northern Nebraska, His ancestry was English, Welsh, Scottish, German and Spanish. Clayton and his brother, James T. "Jimmie" Danks, were reared in Long Pine Canyon in Cherry County, also in northern Nebraska, where their father operated a stagecoach station. Clayton and Jimmie subsequently worked on the Two Bar Ranch in Chugwater in Platte County, Wyoming, near Cheyenne. Clayton worked on the Iron Mountain Ranch, the Dumbell, the Chapman Ranch on the Sweetwater and the Reverse 4 Cattle Company before homesteading in Valentine in Cherry County. He later became a lawman serving seven years as Chief of Police in Parco (now Sinclair) and sheriff of Fremont County for 16 years. He and his wife, the former Marie L. Fitger (1883–1980), had one child, whose name is not revealed in cemetery and birth records. Jimmie Danks and another brother, Harry, settled in South Dakota. A fourth brother made his home in Niobrara County in eastern Wyoming.

== Rodeo career ==
In 1899, Danks began competing in rodeo. In 1904, at the age of 25, he won the Cheyenne Frontier Days competition in steer roping. In 1907, he tried to reclaim the title but failed. First, the steer rose before he could rope it, and on the second attempt, his rope broke. Danks hence entered the saddle bronc competition, and after a few setbacks he made it to the finals, where two horses Millbrook and Steamboat, were waiting for their riders. By a draw, Danks rode Millbrook, considered an easier horse than Steamboat, "the most ferocious bucker Frontier Days had ever seen." At the time the riders tried to stay on the horses until they stopped bucking and started to run.

To Danks, the saddle that he won in 1907 was not a trophy, but a necessity of practical use. In 2008, Danks was inducted into the Cheyenne Frontier Days Hall of Fame, and a search was undertaken for his prize-winning saddle. Family members finally located the saddle at King's Saddlery and Museum in Sheridan, Wyoming, where it was obtained after much negotiation. In 2013, the saddle was donated to the Cheyenne Frontier Days Old West Museum.

The soon to be famous Steamboat of the Wyoming State logo was first ridden by Danks at Frontier Days in 1909. Danks was then working as a ranch hand on the 2-Bar Ranch in the Chugwater area, where Steamboat had been foaled in 1896.

As of 2013, Ed Danks of Dunn Center in Dunn County in western North Dakota is the only living family member who ever met Clayton Danks. "We know [he was] a law enforcement officer, and that he was a fair and honest competitor. It's nice to have a hero," said Ed Danks, in an interview with the Wyoming Tribune-Eagle.

Meanwhile, Danks family members have begun searching for another saddle which Clayton won when he rode Steamboat at the CFD in 1909. Foaled at Chugwater, where Danks had lived early in the 20th century, the black gelding named Steamboat sustained a nose injury, which required removing a bone fragment from a nostril. As a result, the horse developed a sound which resembled the whistling of a steamboat whenever he bucked. The riders who could remain on Steamboat were certain to finish in the money. After Steamboat's death in 1914, Danks rued, "I think a part of the rodeo ended for me, too." Steamboat was inducted in 1975 into the National Cowboy Hall of Fame in Oklahoma City, and in 1979 into the Pro Rodeo Hall of Fame in Colorado Springs.

Danks died in 1970 shortly before his 91st birthday in Thermopolis in Hot Springs County in north central Wyoming. Clayton and Marie Danks are interred at Mount Hope Cemetery in Lander in Fremont County in central Wyoming.
