= Floyd Shaman =

American sculptor (1935–2005)

- Born: December 20, 1935; Wheatland, Wyoming, U.S.
- Died: August 8, 2005 (aged 69)
- Education: North Dakota State Normal and Industrial School; University of Wyoming
- Occupation: Sculptor

Floyd Shaman (December 20, 1935 – August 8, 2005) was an American sculptor.

== Life ==
Born in Wheatland, Wyoming, Shaman lived in several parts of the state in his early years and briefly in Seattle, Washington, where his parents worked in the aircraft industry as part of the war effort. He graduated high school from University Prep in Laramie, Wyoming. Shaman excelled in basketball and won a three-sport scholarship to North Dakota State Normal and Industrial School in Ellendale, North Dakota. After attending college for several years, he enlisted in the United States Navy and became a dental technician, a vocation that would presage his later artistic career. Returning to Wyoming in 1960, Shaman studied sculpture as an undergraduate at the University of Wyoming where he trained under Robert Russin, one of Wyoming's most well-known artists. He earned a Bachelor's degree in art and went on to take a Master's degree in 1969, writing a thesis on the chemical patination of bronze. Shaman left Laramie and moved to Cleveland, Mississippi, to teach art at Delta State University in 1970. He was hired to establish the sculpture division of the art department and he successfully implemented a bronze casting foundry as part of that project. Due to the difficulty of obtaining stone in Mississippi, Shaman began working in the more readily available medium of wood. A residency at Yaddo in 1976 resulted in one of his first major pieces, the Janus Road Show, a collection of three figures representing jazz musicians Shaman saw in New Orleans. He left academia after ten years at Delta State to devote himself full-time to sculpture. Shaman found success as an independent artist, regularly exhibiting work in galleries throughout the United States. One of his most beneficial gallery relationships was with the Elaine Benson Gallery in Bridgehampton, New York, which hosted an invitational charity art show to benefit a local animal rescue group. Shaman's own home and studio served as a local attraction, and starting in the mid-1990s his wife, Molly, ran a popular bed and breakfast that used his work as an appealing highlight of the inn. One of the South's most important figurative artists in the last part of the 20th century, his works are included in major collections across the United States and internationally.

== Technique and subject matter ==
Though he was trained as a stone carver, Shaman's most significant work was in wood and involved the detailed process called lamination. Shaman is featured in the textbook The Sculpture Reference: Techniques, Terms, Tools, Materials, and Sculpture by Arthur Williams, where detailed photographs illustrate his technique and tools. He further refined the lamination process by developing a "hollow-core technique" that resulted in strong, yet lighter pieces. Shaman often filled the empty cavities of his sculptures with objects known only to the artist, a humorous touch that often intrigued and frustrated his patrons. His typical sculpture depicts everyday encounters defined by wry humor, irony, and sober reflection. Shaman's work was also often characterized as whimsical, a quality that can be seen in the work he created for puppeteer Peter Zapletal (see External links below). His life-size human figures frequently portray the working-class people he evidently admires, though he also represented historical figures, animals, and characters from literature and film, including an altarpiece of The Last Supper, which is currently displayed at Good Shepherd Lutheran Church in Cleveland, MS. Shaman used other media in addition to wood, including stone, bronze, ceramics, and painting.

== Museum collections ==
Lauren Rogers Museum of Art, Laurel, Mississippi: The Inventor

Ogden Museum of Southern Art, New Orleans, Louisiana: Karla Announcing

Booth Western Art Museum, Cartersville, Georgia: Spike Finds Romance

The National Cowboy & Western Heritage Museum, Oklahoma City, Oklahoma: Annie Oakley

Memphis Brooks Museum of Art Memphis, Tennessee
