= Whiting, Wyoming =

Census-designated place in Wyoming, US

Whiting
- Census-designated place
- Location in Platte County, Wyoming

- Location within Wyoming
- Coordinates: 42°00′32″N 104°58′16″W
- Elevation: 1,477 m (4,846 ft)

Population (2020)
  - Total: 64
- GNIS feature ID: 2585086

Whiting is a census-designated place in Platte County, Wyoming, United States. The population was 64 at the 2020 census.
