= Chugcreek, Wyoming =

Chugcreek
- CDP
- Location in Platte County and the state of Wyoming
- Coordinates: 42°03′13″N 104°54′28″W
- Country: United States
- State: Wyoming
- County: Platte

Area
  - Total: 1.9 sq mi (5.0 km^{2})
  - Land: 1.9 sq mi (5.0 km^{2})
  - Water: 0 sq mi (0.0 km^{2})
- Elevation: 4,757 ft (1,450 m)

Population (2010(update needed))
  - Total: 156
  - Density: 81/sq mi (31/km^{2})
- Time zone: UTC-7 (Mountain (MST))
  - Summer (DST): UTC-6 (MDT)
- Area code: 307
- FIPS code: 56-14097
- GNIS feature ID: 1853200

Chugcreek is a census-designated place (CDP) in Platte County, Wyoming, United States. The population was 156 at the 2010 census.

== Geography ==
According to the United States Census Bureau, the CDP has a total area of 1.9 square miles (5.0 km^{2}), all land.

== Demographics ==
As of the census of 2000, there were 132 people, 45 households, and 41 families residing in the CDP. The population density was 68.4 people per square mile (26.4/km^{2}). There were 49 housing units at an average density of 25.4/sq mi (9.8/km^{2}). The racial makeup of the CDP was 96.21% White, 3.79% from other races. Hispanic or Latino of any race were 0.76% of the population.

There were 45 households, out of which 42.2% had children under the age of 18 living with them, 80.0% were married couples living together, 8.9% had a female householder with no husband present, and 6.7% were non-families. 6.7% of all households were made up of individuals, and 4.4% had someone living alone who was 65 years of age or older. The average household size was 2.93 and the average family size was 3.00.

In the CDP, the population was spread out, with 31.1% under the age of 18, 5.3% from 18 to 24, 26.5% from 25 to 44, 27.3% from 45 to 64, and 9.8% who were 65 years of age or older. The median age was 41 years. For every 100 females, there were 106.3 males. For every 100 females age 18 and over, there were 102.2 males.

The median income for a household in the CDP was $56,447, and the median income for a family was $56,447. Males had a median income of $50,139 versus $22,500 for females. The per capita income for the CDP was $20,940. None of the population or the families were below the poverty line.

== Education ==
Public education in the community of Chugcreek is provided by Platte County School District #1.
