= Alice Spielman =

Wyoming politician

Member of the Wyoming House of Representatives from the Campbell district
- In office 1952–1955

Alice Spielman was an American Republican politician from Gillette, Wyoming. She represented the Campbell district in the Wyoming House of Representatives from 1952 to 1955.
