= MV Swanland =

History

Cook Islands
- Name: MV Swanland
- Owner: Torbulk, Grimsby
- Operator: Torbulk
- Builder: Bijlsma Lemmer Scheepswerf, Lemmer, The Netherlands
- Launched: 7 January 1977
- Christened: Carebeka IX (1977)
- Renamed: Elsborg (13 Jan 1983 – 14 Nov 1988); Artemis (14 Nov 1988 – 16 Dec 1994); Elsborg (16 Dec 1994 – 12 Aug 1996); Swanland (12 Aug 1996 – 27 Nov 2011)
- Identification: IMO number: 7607431, Callsign E5U2283, MMSI 518333000
- Fate: Foundered in the Irish Sea on 27 November 2011

General characteristics
- Displacement: 2,180 t
- Length: 266 ft (81 m)
- Beam: 46 ft (14 m)
- Draught: 11 ft (3 m)

MV Swanland was a bulk carrier.

The ship was built by Bijlsma Lemmer Scheepswerf of Lemmer in the Netherlands in 1977. Originally named Carebeka IX, she was renamed several times. The vessel was last owned and operated as Swanland by Torbulk, a company based in Grimsby, and was registered in the Cook Islands as a flag of convenience. She was 266 feet long and 46 feet wide with a draft of 11 feet, and displaced 2,180 tons.

In 2010, she narrowly avoided grounding off Lizard Point, Cornwall, after her engines failed and she had to be taken in tow by the emergency tow vessel Anglian Princess and towed into Falmouth.

Swanland sank in a gale force 8 storm in the Irish Sea 10 miles off the Lleyn Peninsula, Gwynedd at approximately 0200 on Sunday 27 November 2011. She was carrying limestone from Raynes Jetty near Colwyn Bay to Cowes on the Isle of Wight.

The search and rescue mission was co-ordinated by Holyhead Coastguard and involved RNLI lifeboats from Pwllheli, Abersoch, Trearddur Bay and Porthdinllaen, RAF Sea King search and rescue helicopters of No. 22 Squadron RAF flying out of RAF Valley and Royal Marines Barracks, Chivenor, A Royal Navy Sea King from 771 Naval Air Squadron based at RNAS Culdrose, Irish Naval Service patrol ship LÉ Róisín and an Irish Air Corps Casa maritime patrol aircraft, and Irish Coast Guard helicopters from Dublin, Waterford and Sligo, and other ships in the area – MT Bro Gazelle, MT Monsoon and MT Keewhit. Two of the Russian crew were rescued during the sinking with Prince William taking part in the rescue mission. A third crewman was later found dead during a search for survivors. The rescued crew described how a large wave broke the ship's back.

On 11 December 2011 the BBC reported that Swanland had been subject to repeated safety concerns due to unsafe loading and unloading practices that may have placed stress on the hull. The Marine Accident Investigation Branch (MAIB) conducted an inquiry into the sinking and published its report in June 2013
