= Swan Land and Cattle Company Headquarters =

- U.S. National Register of Historic Places
- U.S. National Historic Landmark
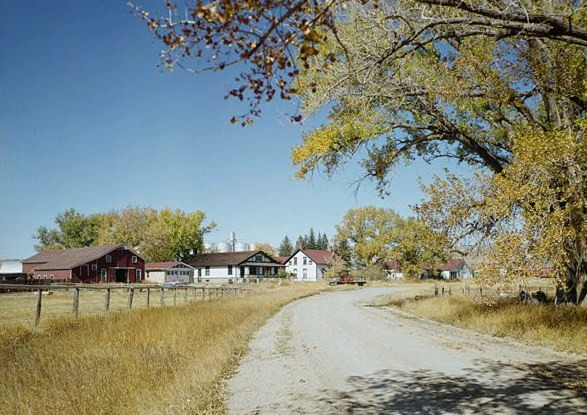
- Swan Land & Cattle Company

- Location within Wyoming Location within the United States
- Location: E side of Chugwater, Chugwater, Wyoming
- Coordinates: 41°45′17.38″N 104°49′9.58″W
- Area: 60 acres (24 ha)
- Built: 1884
- NRHP reference No.: 66000760

Significant dates
- Added to NRHP: October 15, 1966
- Designated NHL: July 19, 1964

The Swan Land and Cattle Company Headquarters are a historic ranch headquarters complex on Wyoming Highway 313 in Chugwater, Wyoming. Organized in 1883 in Scotland, the Swan Company was one of the largest ranching operations in the nation in the late 19th and early 20th centuries, managing more than one million acres of land. Now a much smaller operation, its former headquarters complex was declared a National Historic Landmark in 1964.

== Description and history ==
The Swan Land and Cattle Company Headquarters complex is located on the south side of Chugwater, at the junction of Happy Hollow Road and Lone Tree Road (Wyoming Highway 313). The four surviving buildings are arrayed in a north-south line along Happy Hollow Road, a former stagecoach route. All are single-story frame structures finished in wooden clapboards. The general store, at the northern end, has flanking shed-roof sections and was built in 1913. To its south is the former manager's residence, built in 1876 and featuring some finely crafted Stick style decoration. To its south are the utilitarian office building and a barn, the former built in 1918 and the latter c. 1876. The property is adorned by mature cottonwoods planted by the company in 1888.

The Swan Company was founded in 1883 by Scottish investors with an initial capital investment of $3 million. At its peak in 1887-88, the company had more than 113,000 head of cattle and controlled more than one million acres of rangeland across eastern Wyoming and western Nebraska. In 1904, it converted its business from cattle to sheep, peaking in 1911 with 112,000 head. The company began liquidating its holdings in 1945, and it managed just 5,400 acres (2,200 ha) when this property was designated a National Historic Landmark in 1964.

== See also ==
- List of National Historic Landmarks in Wyoming
- National Register of Historic Places listings in Platte County, Wyoming
