= Slater, Wyoming =

- CDP
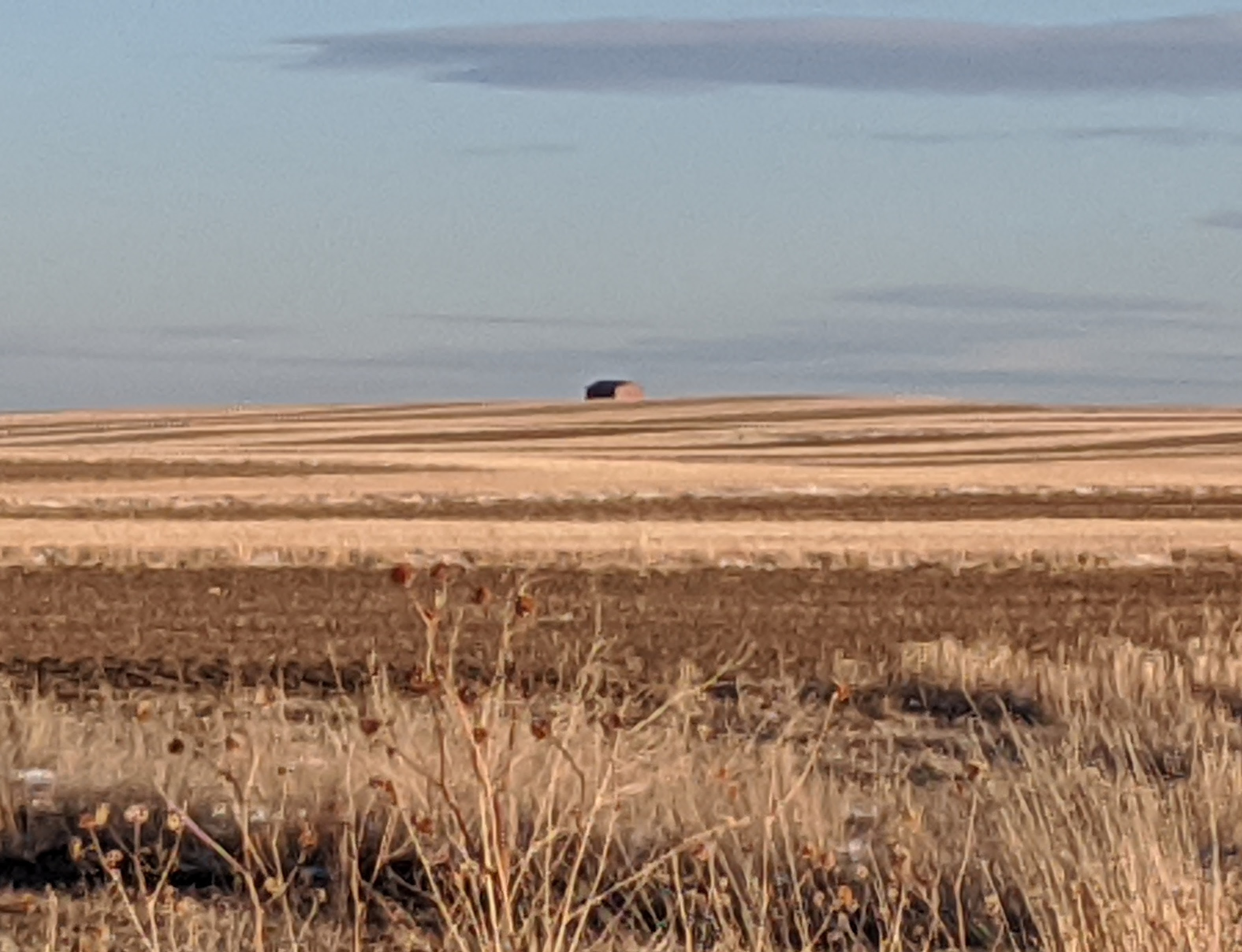
- A field in Slater

- Location in Platte County and the state of Wyoming.
- Coordinates: 41°52′23″N 104°49′12″W
- Country: United States
- State: Wyoming
- County: Platte

Area
  - Total: 74.0 sq mi (191.6 km^{2})
  - Land: 74.0 sq mi (191.6 km^{2})
  - Water: 0 sq mi (0.0 km^{2})
- Elevation: 4,997 ft (1,523 m)

Population (2010)
  - Total: 80
  - Density: 1.1/sq mi (0.42/km^{2})
- Time zone: UTC-7 (Mountain (MST))
  - Summer (DST): UTC-6 (MDT)
- ZIP code: 82201
- Area code: 307
- FIPS code: 56-71295
- GNIS feature ID: 1609156

Slater is a census-designated place (CDP) in Platte County, Wyoming, United States. The population was 80 at the 2010 census.

== Geography ==
According to the United States Census Bureau, the CDP has a total area of 74.0 square miles (191.6 km^{2}), all land.

== Demographics ==
As of the census of 2000, there were 82 people, 31 households, and 23 families residing in the CDP. The population density was 1.1 people per square mile (0.4/km^{2}). There were 42 housing units at an average density of 0.6/sq mi (0.2/km^{2}). The racial makeup of the CDP was 100.00% White.

There were 31 households, out of which 35.5% had children under the age of 18 living with them, 74.2% were married couples living together, and 22.6% were non-families. 22.6% of all households were made up of individuals, and 12.9% had someone living alone who was 65 years of age or older. The average household size was 2.65 and the average family size was 3.08.

In the CDP, the population was spread out, with 30.5% under the age of 18, 1.2% from 18 to 24, 22.0% from 25 to 44, 36.6% from 45 to 64, and 9.8% who were 65 years of age or older. The median age was 40 years. For every 100 females, there were 134.3 males. For every 100 females age 18 and over, there were 111.1 males.

The median income for a household in the CDP was $97,593, and the median income for a family was $97,593. Males had a median income of $73,542 versus $21,607 for females. The per capita income for the CDP was $44,985. None of the population or the families were below the poverty line.

== Education ==
Public education in the community of Slater is provided by Platte County School District #1.
