= Wheatland, Wyoming =

- Town
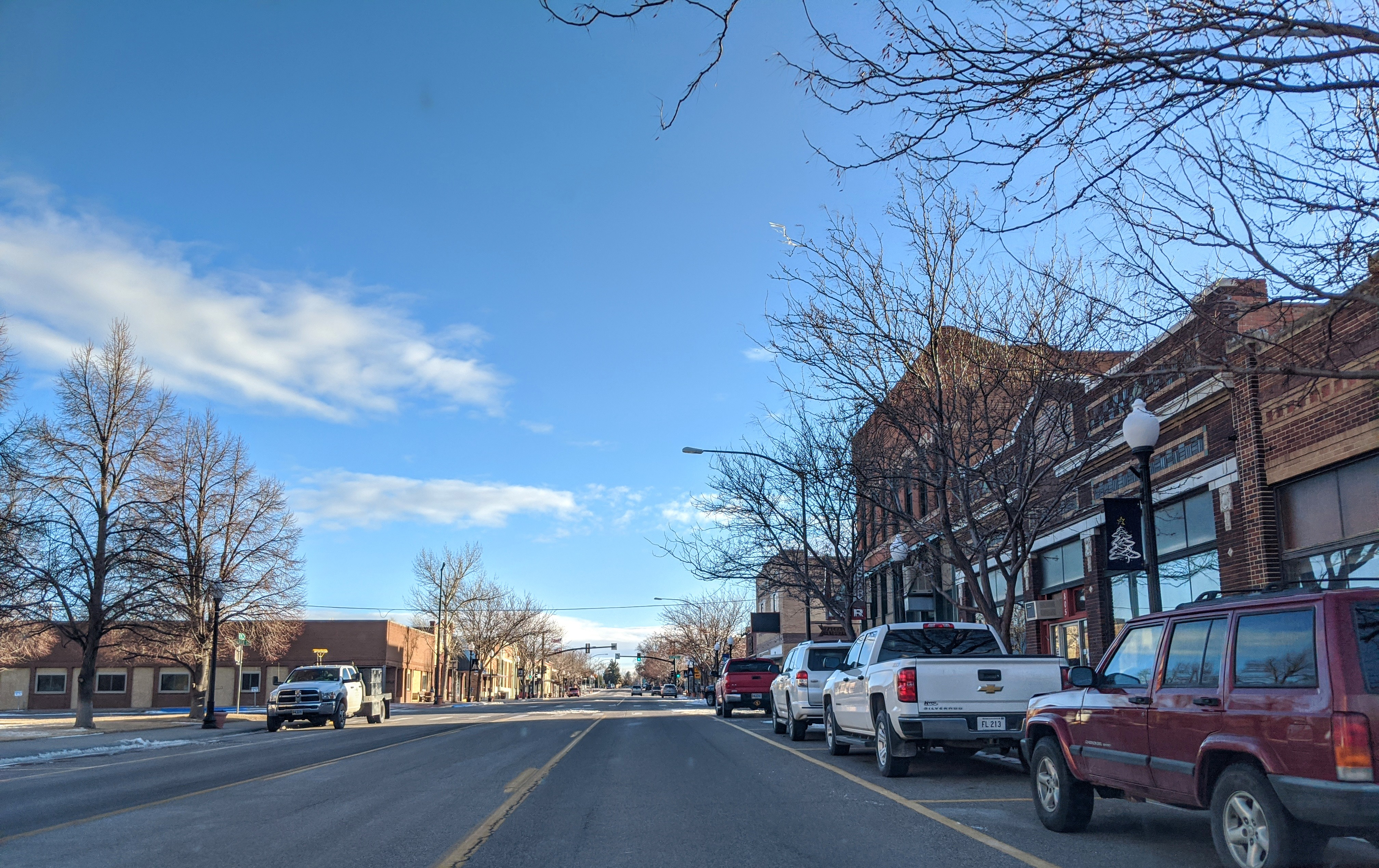
- Downtown Wheatland

- Location of Wheatland in Platte County, Wyoming
- Coordinates: 42°03′06″N 104°57′34″W
- Country: United States
- State: Wyoming
- County: Platte

Area
  - Total: 4.10 sq mi (10.61 km^{2})
  - Land: 4.10 sq mi (10.61 km^{2})
  - Water: 0 sq mi (0.00 km^{2})
- Elevation: 4,751 ft (1,448 m)

Population (2020)
  - Total: 3,588
  - Density: 876/sq mi (338.1/km^{2})
- Time zone: UTC-7 (Mountain (MST))
  - Summer (DST): UTC-6 (MDT)
- ZIP code: 82201
- Area code: 307
- FIPS code: 56-83040
- GNIS feature ID: 2413476
- Website: Official website

Wheatland is a town in and the county seat of Platte County in southeastern Wyoming, United States. The population was 3,588 at the 2020 census.

== History ==
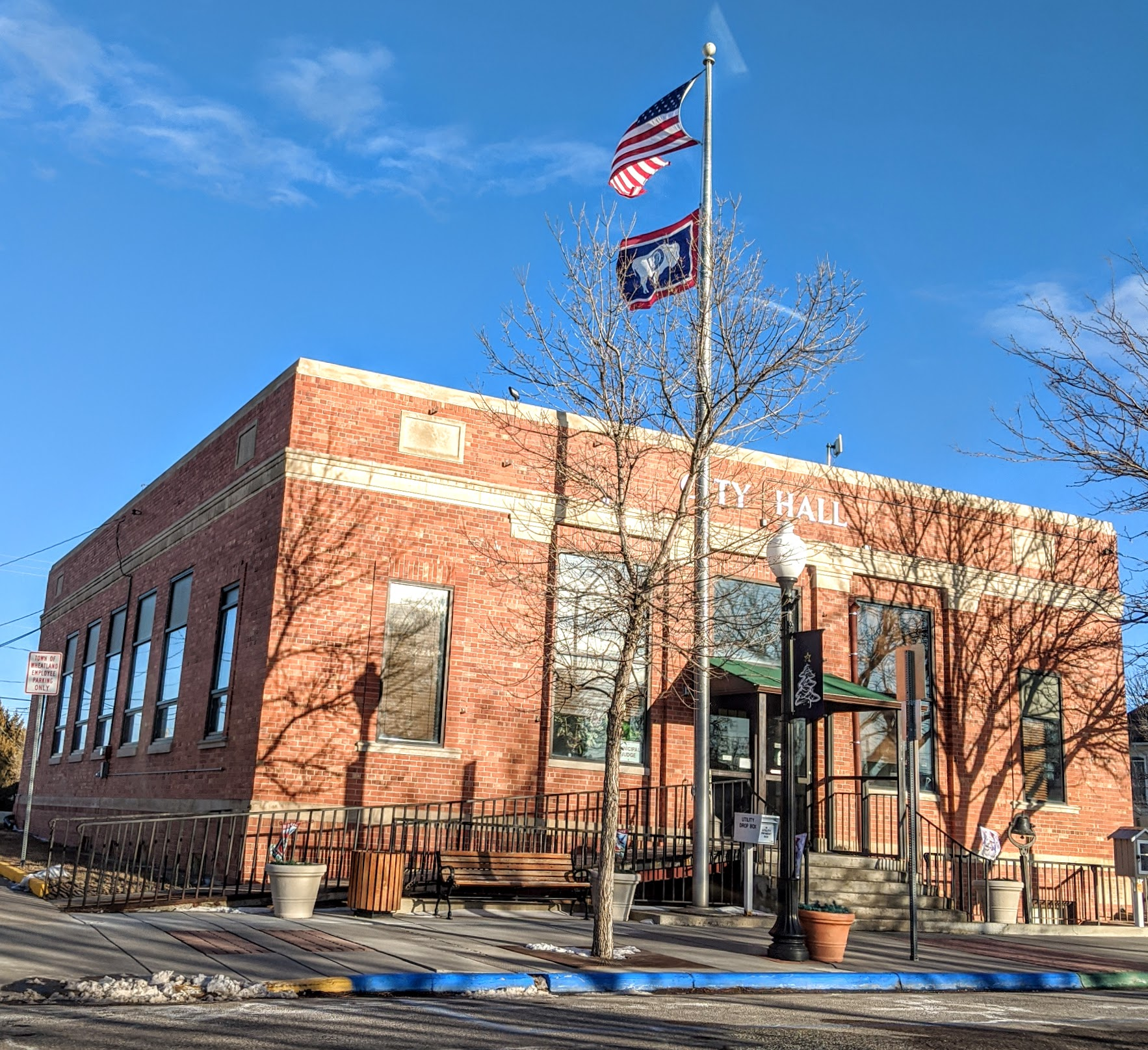
Wheatland City Hall

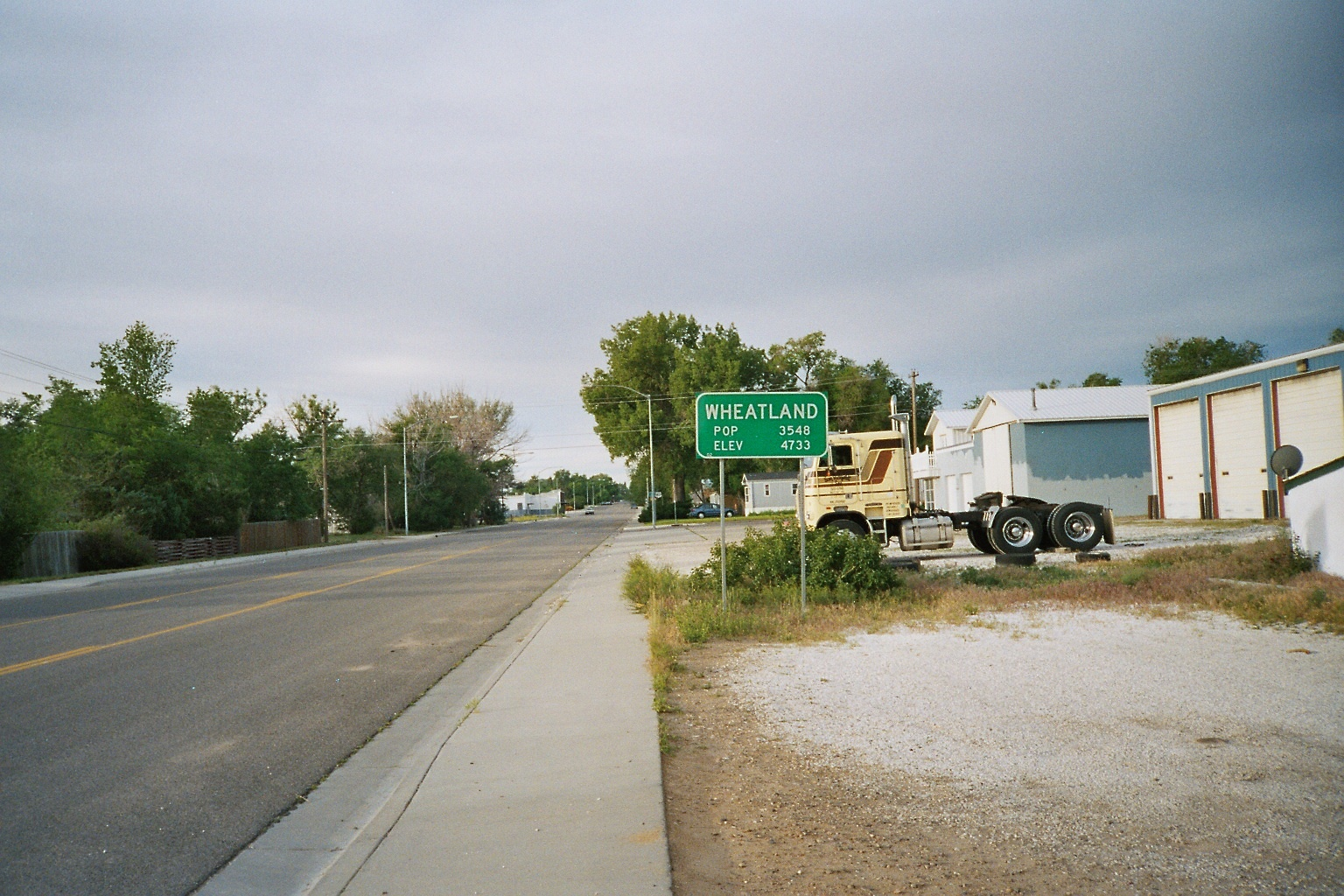
City limits

Before the late 19th century, the area around the future site of Wheatland was a flat, arid landscape with desert-like vegetation. In 1883, local rancher and judge Joseph M. Carey, along with Horace Plunkett, John Hoyt, Morton Post, Francis E. Warren, William Irvine, and Andrew Gilchrist, established the Wyoming Development Company. The company hoped to irrigate in the Wheatland Flats and profit from new development.

By the fall of 1883, an irrigation system was constructed on the Wheatland flats including a 2,380 foot long tunnel to divert water for irrigation into Bluegrass Creek and the first two of the system's canals. The Cheyenne and Northern Railway line reached the Wheatland flats in July 1887, eventually extending to the Wyoming Central Railway at Wendover. The line was eventually sold to the Colorado and Southern Railway, controlled by the Chicago, Burlington, and Quincy Railroad, and operated at Wheatland station. Lots in the town of Wheatland were auctioned in 1894. By 1915, many farms were established in the irrigation district and the population of the flats was 5,277.

In 1911, Platte County was created from a portion of Albany County, and Wheatland was selected as the county seat. The Platte County Courthouse was built in Wheatland in 1917.

The Wheatland Irrigation District is still the largest privately owned irrigation system in the country.

== Geography ==
According to the United States Census Bureau, the town has a total area of 4.10 square miles (10.62 km^{2}), all land.

=== Climate ===
Wheatland experiences a semi-arid climate (Köppen BSk) with cold, dry winters and hot, wetter summers.

Climate data for Wheatland 4N, Wyoming (1991–2020 normals, extremes 1893–present)
Month	Jan	Feb	Mar	Apr	May	Jun	Jul	Aug	Sep	Oct	Nov	Dec	Year
Record high °F (°C)	70 (21)	74 (23)	86 (30)	91 (33)	98 (37)	108 (42)	107 (42)	112 (44)	101 (38)	92 (33)	86 (30)	76 (24)	112 (44)
Mean maximum °F (°C)	60.2 (15.7)	63.2 (17.3)	74.2 (23.4)	80.9 (27.2)	88.9 (31.6)	95.7 (35.4)	99.9 (37.7)	98.0 (36.7)	94.2 (34.6)	84.2 (29.0)	70.7 (21.5)	61.7 (16.5)	100.6 (38.1)
Mean daily maximum °F (°C)	43.3 (6.3)	45.1 (7.3)	55.4 (13.0)	62.1 (16.7)	71.1 (21.7)	82.7 (28.2)	90.3 (32.4)	89.0 (31.7)	80.2 (26.8)	65.6 (18.7)	52.4 (11.3)	42.8 (6.0)	65.0 (18.3)
Daily mean °F (°C)	30.0 (−1.1)	30.8 (−0.7)	39.8 (4.3)	46.1 (7.8)	55.1 (12.8)	65.4 (18.6)	72.2 (22.3)	70.5 (21.4)	61.6 (16.4)	48.8 (9.3)	38.0 (3.3)	29.5 (−1.4)	49.0 (9.4)
Mean daily minimum °F (°C)	16.6 (−8.6)	16.5 (−8.6)	24.1 (−4.4)	30.0 (−1.1)	39.2 (4.0)	48.0 (8.9)	54.1 (12.3)	52.0 (11.1)	43.1 (6.2)	32.0 (0.0)	23.7 (−4.6)	16.2 (−8.8)	33.0 (0.6)
Mean minimum °F (°C)	−12.2 (−24.6)	−6.1 (−21.2)	5.7 (−14.6)	15.8 (−9.0)	26.8 (−2.9)	39.2 (4.0)	45.6 (7.6)	42.9 (6.1)	31.0 (−0.6)	15.1 (−9.4)	−0.4 (−18.0)	−10.0 (−23.3)	−19.5 (−28.6)
Record low °F (°C)	−36 (−38)	−36 (−38)	−25 (−32)	−22 (−30)	13 (−11)	28 (−2)	29 (−2)	25 (−4)	12 (−11)	−9 (−23)	−19 (−28)	−39 (−39)	−39 (−39)
Average precipitation inches (mm)	0.28 (7.1)	0.42 (11)	0.74 (19)	1.70 (43)	2.70 (69)	2.12 (54)	1.73 (44)	1.17 (30)	1.29 (33)	1.14 (29)	0.45 (11)	0.39 (9.9)	14.13 (359)
Average snowfall inches (cm)	4.6 (12)	7.8 (20)	7.4 (19)	5.4 (14)	1.4 (3.6)	0.0 (0.0)	0.0 (0.0)	0.0 (0.0)	0.1 (0.25)	3.2 (8.1)	4.3 (11)	5.7 (14)	39.9 (101)
Average precipitation days (≥ 0.01 in)	2.7	3.4	3.6	5.7	7.8	7.5	6.3	5.8	5.4	4.3	3.0	2.8	58.3
Average snowy days (≥ 0.1 in)	2.7	3.2	2.8	2.0	0.6	0.0	0.0	0.0	0.2	1.1	2.4	3.1	18.1
Source: NOAA

== Demographics ==
Historical population
Census	Pop.	Note	%±
1910	796		—
1920	1,336		67.8%
1930	1,997		49.5%
1940	2,110		5.7%
1950	2,286		8.3%
1960	2,350		2.8%
1970	2,498		6.3%
1980	5,816		132.8%
1990	3,271		−43.8%
2000	3,548		8.5%
2010	3,627		2.2%
2020	3,588		−1.1%
2023 (est.)	3,509	▼	−2.2%
U.S. Decennial Census

=== 2020 census ===
As of the 2020 census, Wheatland had a population of 3,588. The median age was 45.3 years. 20.3% of residents were under the age of 18 and 24.5% of residents were 65 years of age or older. For every 100 females there were 93.0 males, and for every 100 females age 18 and over there were 91.1 males age 18 and over.

0.0% of residents lived in urban areas, while 100.0% lived in rural areas.

There were 1,584 households in Wheatland, of which 25.6% had children under the age of 18 living in them. Of all households, 44.8% were married-couple households, 19.8% were households with a male householder and no spouse or partner present, and 28.7% were households with a female householder and no spouse or partner present. About 35.0% of all households were made up of individuals and 18.3% had someone living alone who was 65 years of age or older.

There were 1,903 housing units, of which 16.8% were vacant. The homeowner vacancy rate was 2.8% and the rental vacancy rate was 13.5%.

Racial composition as of the 2020 census
Race	Number	Percent
White	3,141	87.5%
Black or African American	9	0.3%
American Indian and Alaska Native	37	1.0%
Asian	37	1.0%
Native Hawaiian and Other Pacific Islander	0	0.0%
Some other race	146	4.1%
Two or more races	218	6.1%
Hispanic or Latino (of any race)	373	10.4%

=== 2010 census ===
As of the census of 2010, there were 3,627 people, 1,657 households, and 974 families living in the town. The population density was 884.6 inhabitants per square mile (341.5/km^{2}). There were 1,879 housing units at an average density of 458.3 per square mile (177.0/km^{2}). The racial makeup of the town was 95.1% White, 0.1% African American, 0.4% Native American, 0.7% Asian, 2.1% from other races, and 1.6% from two or more races. Hispanic or Latino of any race were 7.4% of the population.

There were 1,657 households, of which 25.0% had children under the age of 18 living with them, 46.0% were married couples living together, 8.8% had a female householder with no husband present, 3.9% had a male householder with no wife present, and 41.2% were non-families. 37.5% of all households were made up of individuals, and 19.3% had someone living alone who was 65 years of age or older. The average household size was 2.13 and the average family size was 2.78.

The median age in the town was 45.4 years. 20.7% of residents were under the age of 18; 7.1% were between the ages of 18 and 24; 21.6% were from 25 to 44; 28.3% were from 45 to 64; and 22.3% were 65 years of age or older. The gender makeup of the town was 48.7% male and 51.3% female.

=== 2000 census ===
As of the census of 2000, there were 3,548 people, 1,539 households, and 980 families living in the town. The population density was 837.6 people per square mile (323.1/km^{2}). There were 1,764 housing units at an average density of 416.4 per square mile (160.6/km^{2}). The racial makeup of the town was 96.00% White, 0.31% African American, 0.68% Native American, 0.34% Asian, 1.89% from other races, and 0.79% from two or more races. Hispanic or Latino of any race were 6.54% of the population.

There were 1,539 households, out of which 27.0% had children under the age of 18 living with them, 52.7% were married couples living together, 7.9% had a female householder with no husband present, and 36.3% were non-families. 32.2% of all households were made up of individuals, and 16.8% had someone living alone who was 65 years of age or older. The average household size was 2.24 and the average family size was 2.83.

In the town, the population was spread out, with 22.8% under the age of 18, 7.2% from 18 to 24, 22.7% from 25 to 44, 26.5% from 45 to 64, and 20.8% who were 65 years of age or older. The median age was 43 years. For every 100 females, there were 89.5 males. For every 100 females age 18 and over, there were 88.8 males.

The median income for a household in the town was $35,208, and the median income for a family was $42,623. Males had a median income of $34,940 versus $20,185 for females. The per capita income for the town was $19,069. About 6.9% of families and 8.9% of the population were below the poverty line, including 9.9% of those under age 18 and 8.6% of those age 65 or over.

== Education ==
Public education in the town of Wheatland is provided by Platte County School District #1. Campuses serving the town include Libbey Elementary School (grades K–2), West Elementary School (grades 3–5), Wheatland Middle School (grades 6–8), and Wheatland High School (grades 9–12).

Wheatland has a public library, a branch of the Platte County Public Library System.

== Transport ==
=== Highways ===
- I-25 - bypasses on the west.
- US 87 - north-south route through Wheatland.
- WYO 310 (Hightower Rd.)
- WYO 312 (Ferguson Rd.)
- WYO 316 (Antelope Gap Rd.)
- WYO 320 (No. Wheatland Hwy.)

=== Transit ===
Intercity bus service to the city is provided by Express Arrow.

=== Air Transport ===
Wheatland is served by Phifer Airfield just east of town on State Route 316 (Gilchrist St./Antelope Gap Rd.). However, the field has no direct commercial service, residents can choose between Western Nebraska Regional Airport, Casper–Natrona County International Airport, and Cheyenne Regional Airport.

=== Railroads ===
Wheatland is the home of the historical Wheatland station, then operated by Union Pacific, Denver and Gulf Railway. The station is not open today for revenue service, though the tracks through Wheatland are currently owned and used by Berkshire Hathaway's BNSF Railway after a series of acquisitions which gave BNSF the Wheatland assets formerly operated by Union Pacific, Denver and Gulf. BNSF currently has small offices located in Wheatland.

== Arts and culture ==
Wheatland hosts the annual Platte County Fair & Rodeo, usually held the second full week of August, at the fairgrounds on the east edge of town at Front Street and Antelope Gap Road.

The horse Steamboat, the model for the bucking horse and rider motif on the Wyoming license plate, was stabled near Wheatland in a barn owned and maintained as a historical structure by Mike and Linda Holst. Steamboat is also the logo for the University of Wyoming.

== Notable people ==
- Deborah Alden, member of the Wyoming House of Representatives
- Benjamin N. Bellis (1924–2019), United States Air Force Lieutenant General
- Casey Bramlet, NFL quarterback
- Freckles Brown (1921–1987), Professional Rodeo Cowboys Association world champion bull rider
- Edward Bryant (1945–2017), science fiction writer, fantasy author
- Jim Geringer (born 1944), former governor of Wyoming
- Robert Mills Grant (1926–2012), Republican member of the Wyoming House of Representatives
- Jeremy Haroldson, pastor, member of the Wyoming House of Representatives
- Charles Hoskinson (born 1987), founder of Cardano (blockchain platform), co-founder of Ethereum
- Floyd Shaman (1935–2005), sculptor
- Irving W. Twiford (1898–1988), member of the Wyoming House of Representatives
- Dennis Utter (1939–2011), Nebraska state legislator
