= Platte County, Wyoming =

County in Wyoming, United States

- County
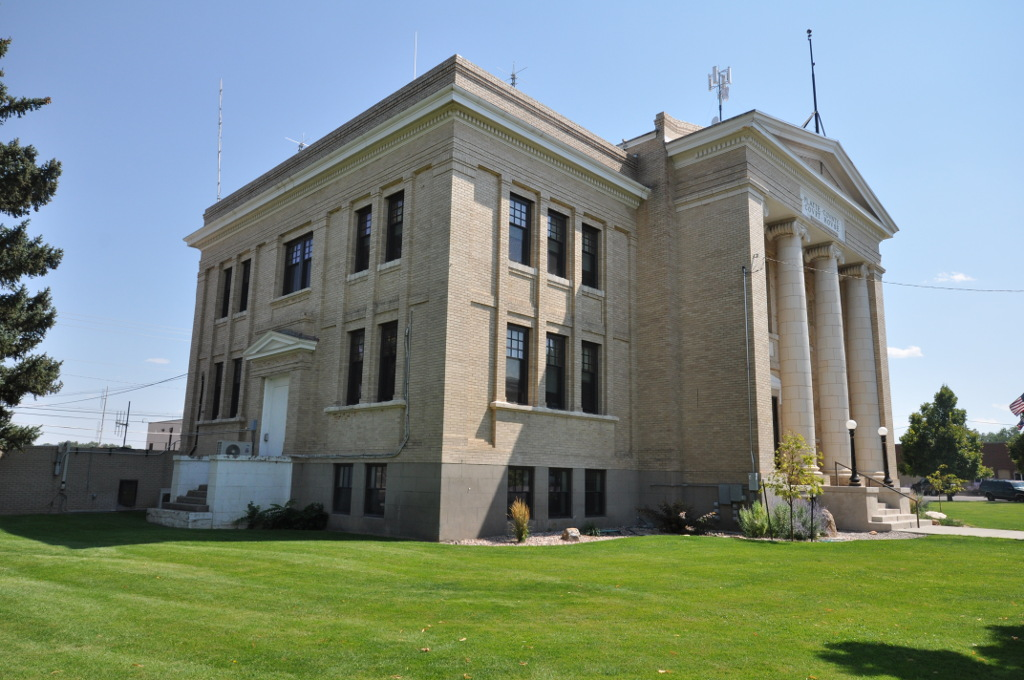
- Platte County Courthouse

- Flag

- Location within the U.S. state of Wyoming
- Coordinates: 42°08′N 104°58′W
- Country: United States
- State: Wyoming
- Founded: February 21, 1911 (authorized); 1913 (organized)
- Named for: North Platte River
- Seat: Wheatland
- Largest town: Wheatland

Area
  - Total: 2,111 sq mi (5,470 km^{2})
  - Land: 2,084 sq mi (5,400 km^{2})
  - Water: 27 sq mi (70 km^{2}) 1.3%

Population (2020)
  - Total: 8,605
  - Estimate (2025): 8,634 ▲
  - Density: 4.129/sq mi (1.594/km^{2})
- Time zone: UTC−7 (Mountain)
  - Summer (DST): UTC−6 (MDT)
- Congressional district: At-large
- Website: plattecountywyoming.com

Platte County is a county located in the U.S. state of Wyoming. As of the 2020 United States census, the population was 8,605. Its county seat is Wheatland.

== History ==
Platte County was created February 21, 1911, with land detached from Laramie County, and organized in 1913. The county was named for the North Platte River, which flows through the northeastern part of the county.

== Geography ==
According to the US Census Bureau, the county has a total area of 2,111 square miles (5,470 km^{2}), of which 2,084 square miles (5,400 km^{2}) is land and 27 square miles (70 km^{2}) (1.3%) is water. It is the third-smallest county in Wyoming by area.

=== Adjacent counties ===
- Niobrara County (northeast)
- Goshen County (east)
- Laramie County (south)
- Albany County (west)
- Converse County (northwest)

=== National protected area ===
- Medicine Bow National Forest (part)

=== Major highways ===
- Interstate 25
- U.S. Highway 26
- U.S. Highway 87
- Wyoming Highway 34

== Demographics ==
Historical population
| Census | Pop. | Note | %± |
|---|---|---|---|
| 1920 | 7,421 | | — |
| 1930 | 9,695 | | 30.6% |
| 1940 | 8,013 | | −17.3% |
| 1950 | 7,925 | | −1.1% |
| 1960 | 7,195 | | −9.2% |
| 1970 | 6,486 | | −9.9% |
| 1980 | 11,975 | | 84.6% |
| 1990 | 8,145 | | −32.0% |
| 2000 | 8,807 | | 8.1% |
| 2010 | 8,667 | | −1.6% |
| 2020 | 8,605 | | −0.7% |
| 2025 (est.) | 8,634 | ▲ | 0.3% |
US Decennial Census; 1870–2000 2010–2016

=== 2020 census ===
As of the 2020 census, the county had a population of 8,605. Of the residents, 19.9% were under the age of 18 and 25.9% were 65 years of age or older; the median age was 49.1 years. For every 100 females there were 99.8 males, and for every 100 females age 18 and over there were 99.2 males.

Platte County, Wyoming – Racial and ethnic composition Note: the US Census treats Hispanic/Latino as an ethnic category. This table excludes Latinos from the racial categories and assigns them to a separate category. Hispanics/Latinos may be of any race.
| Race / Ethnicity (NH = Non-Hispanic) | Pop 2000 | Pop 2010 | Pop 2020 | % 2000 | % 2010 | % 2020 |
|---|---|---|---|---|---|---|
| White alone (NH) | 8,181 | 7,908 | 7,469 | 92.89% | 91.24% | 86.80% |
| Black or African American alone (NH) | 3 | 25 | 19 | 0.03% | 0.29% | 0.22% |
| Native American or Alaska Native alone (NH) | 37 | 29 | 67 | 0.42% | 0.33% | 0.78% |
| Asian alone (NH) | 9 | 31 | 43 | 0.10% | 0.36% | 0.50% |
| Pacific Islander alone (NH) | 2 | 5 | 4 | 0.02% | 0.06% | 0.05% |
| Other race alone (NH) | 24 | 6 | 33 | 0.27% | 0.07% | 0.38% |
| Mixed race or Multiracial (NH) | 86 | 83 | 275 | 0.98% | 0.96% | 3.20% |
| Hispanic or Latino (any race) | 465 | 580 | 695 | 5.28% | 6.69% | 8.08% |
| Total | 8,807 | 8,667 | 8,605 | 100.00% | 100.00% | 100.00% |

The racial makeup of the county was 89.9% White, 0.2% Black or African American, 0.8% American Indian and Alaska Native, 0.5% Asian, 2.5% from some other race, and 5.9% from two or more races. Hispanic or Latino residents of any race comprised 8.1% of the population.

There were 3,776 households in the county, of which 24.4% had children under the age of 18 living with them and 22.4% had a female householder with no spouse or partner present. About 30.2% of all households were made up of individuals and 15.9% had someone living alone who was 65 years of age or older.

There were 4,595 housing units, of which 17.8% were vacant. Among occupied housing units, 75.0% were owner-occupied and 25.0% were renter-occupied. The homeowner vacancy rate was 2.2% and the rental vacancy rate was 12.0%.

=== 2010 census ===
As of the 2010 United States census, there were 8,667 people, 3,838 households, and 2,505 families in the county. The population density was 4.2 people per square mile (1.6 people/km^{2}). There were 4,667 housing units at an average density of 2.2 units per square mile (0.85 units/km^{2}). The racial makeup of the county was 95.4% white, 0.4% Asian, 0.4% American Indian, 0.3% black or African American, 0.1% Pacific islander, 2.0% from other races, and 1.5% from two or more races. Those of Hispanic or Latino origin made up 6.7% of the population. In terms of ancestry, 45.3% were German, 21.1% were English, 17.3% were Irish, and 6.2% were American.

Of the 3,838 households, 24.5% had children under the age of 18 living with them, 54.9% were married couples living together, 6.9% had a female householder with no husband present, 34.7% were non-families, and 30.6% of all households were made up of individuals. The average household size was 2.23 and the average family size was 2.76. The median age was 47.5 years.

The median income for a household in the county was $42,947 and the median income for a family was $51,759. Males had a median income of $55,757 versus $29,366 for females. The per capita income for the county was $24,185. About 6.1% of families and 10.3% of the population were below the poverty line, including 18.2% of those under age 18 and 3.5% of those age 65 or over.

=== 2000 census ===
As of the 2000 United States census, there were 8,807 people, 3,625 households, and 2,494 families in the county. The population density was 4 people per square mile (1.5 people/km^{2}). There were 4,528 housing units at an average density of 2 units per square mile (0.77 units/km^{2}). The racial makeup of the county was 96.18% White, 0.16% Black or African American, 0.50% Native American, 0.17% Asian, 0.02% Pacific Islander, 1.69% from other races, and 1.27% from two or more races. 5.28% of the population were Hispanic or Latino of any race. 31.7% were of German, 13.4% Irish, 11.3% English and 7.5% American ancestry.

There were 3,625 households, out of which 30.00% had children under the age of 18 living with them, 58.90% were married couples living together, 6.80% had a female householder with no husband present, and 31.20% were non-families. 27.30% of all households were made up of individuals, and 13.20% had someone living alone who was 65 years of age or older. The average household size was 2.40 and the average family size was 2.92.

The county population contained 25.40% under the age of 18, 6.60% from 18 to 24, 24.30% from 25 to 44, 27.30% from 45 to 64, and 16.60% who were 65 years of age or older. The median age was 41 years. For every 100 females there were 97.40 males. For every 100 females age 18 and over, there were 96.50 males.

The median income for a household in the county was $33,866, and the median income for a family was $41,449. Males had a median income of $31,484 versus $19,635 for females. The per capita income for the county was $17,530. About 8.50% of families and 11.70% of the population were below the poverty line, including 15.90% of those under age 18 and 12.20% of those age 65 or over.

== Communities ==
=== Towns ===
- Chugwater
- Glendo
- Guernsey
- Hartville
- Wheatland (county seat)

=== Census-designated places ===
- Chugcreek
- El Rancho
- Lakeview North
- Slater
- Westview Circle
- Whiting
- Y-O Ranch

=== Unincorporated communities ===
- Bordeaux
- Diamond
- Dwyer
- Uva
- Wendover

=== Ghost towns ===
- Sunrise

== Notable people ==
- Jim Geringer, governor of Wyoming
- Robert Mills Grant, Wyoming State Representative

== Politics ==
Platte County has been a statewide bellwhether since its creation in 1912. No candidate in history has ever carried Wyoming without winning Platte County.

United States presidential election results for Platte County, Wyoming
| Year | Republican | | Democratic | | Third party(ies) | |
| Year | No. | % | No. | % | No. | % |
|---|---|---|---|---|---|---|
| 1912 | 500 | 28.33% | 785 | 44.48% | 480 | 27.20% |
| 1916 | 806 | 36.69% | 1,276 | 58.08% | 115 | 5.23% |
| 1920 | 1,405 | 65.68% | 694 | 32.45% | 40 | 1.87% |
| 1924 | 1,383 | 49.55% | 436 | 15.62% | 972 | 34.83% |
| 1928 | 2,206 | 67.75% | 932 | 28.62% | 118 | 3.62% |
| 1932 | 1,430 | 39.46% | 1,893 | 52.24% | 301 | 8.31% |
| 1936 | 1,546 | 45.39% | 1,730 | 50.79% | 130 | 3.82% |
| 1940 | 1,758 | 48.54% | 1,849 | 51.05% | 15 | 0.41% |
| 1944 | 1,776 | 53.49% | 1,544 | 46.51% | 0 | 0.00% |
| 1948 | 1,366 | 47.88% | 1,465 | 51.35% | 22 | 0.77% |
| 1952 | 2,148 | 60.95% | 1,364 | 38.71% | 12 | 0.34% |
| 1956 | 1,848 | 55.21% | 1,499 | 44.79% | 0 | 0.00% |
| 1960 | 1,771 | 53.20% | 1,558 | 46.80% | 0 | 0.00% |
| 1964 | 1,470 | 43.75% | 1,890 | 56.25% | 0 | 0.00% |
| 1968 | 1,613 | 54.36% | 1,035 | 34.88% | 319 | 10.75% |
| 1972 | 2,200 | 70.35% | 925 | 29.58% | 2 | 0.06% |
| 1976 | 1,844 | 53.45% | 1,593 | 46.17% | 13 | 0.38% |
| 1980 | 2,642 | 57.21% | 1,555 | 33.67% | 421 | 9.12% |
| 1984 | 2,813 | 68.28% | 1,232 | 29.90% | 75 | 1.82% |
| 1988 | 2,253 | 59.16% | 1,482 | 38.92% | 73 | 1.92% |
| 1992 | 1,668 | 41.18% | 1,398 | 34.51% | 985 | 24.31% |
| 1996 | 2,155 | 48.89% | 1,631 | 37.00% | 622 | 14.11% |
| 2000 | 2,925 | 66.89% | 1,249 | 28.56% | 199 | 4.55% |
| 2004 | 3,149 | 68.85% | 1,328 | 29.03% | 97 | 2.12% |
| 2008 | 3,002 | 65.83% | 1,407 | 30.86% | 151 | 3.31% |
| 2012 | 3,136 | 69.21% | 1,223 | 26.99% | 172 | 3.80% |
| 2016 | 3,437 | 75.89% | 719 | 15.88% | 373 | 8.24% |
| 2020 | 3,898 | 79.18% | 890 | 18.08% | 135 | 2.74% |
| 2024 | 3,874 | 81.30% | 780 | 16.37% | 111 | 2.33% |

== See also ==
- National Register of Historic Places listings in Platte County, Wyoming
- Wyoming
  - List of cities and towns in Wyoming
  - List of counties in Wyoming
  - Wyoming statistical areas
