= List of airports in the United States =

The list of airports in the United States is broken down into separate lists due to the large number of airports. The lists include public-use and military airports in each U.S. state and territory.

Top passenger airports by enplanements

Cargo airports by weight landed

== By state ==
- List of airports in Alabama
- List of airports in Alaska
- List of airports in Arizona
- List of airports in Arkansas
- List of airports in California
- List of airports in Colorado
- List of airports in Connecticut
- List of airports in Delaware
- List of airports in Florida
- List of airports in Georgia
- List of airports in Hawaii
- List of airports in Idaho
- List of airports in Illinois
- List of airports in Indiana
- List of airports in Iowa
- List of airports in Kansas
- List of airports in Kentucky
- List of airports in Louisiana
- List of airports in Maine
- List of airports in Maryland
- List of airports in Massachusetts
- List of airports in Michigan
- List of airports in Minnesota
- List of airports in Mississippi
- List of airports in Missouri
- List of airports in Montana
- List of airports in Nebraska
- List of airports in Nevada
- List of airports in New Hampshire
- List of airports in New Jersey
- List of airports in New Mexico
- List of airports in New York
- List of airports in North Carolina
- List of airports in North Dakota
- List of airports in Ohio
- List of airports in Oklahoma
- List of airports in Oregon
- List of airports in Pennsylvania
- List of airports in Rhode Island
- List of airports in South Carolina
- List of airports in South Dakota
- List of airports in Tennessee
- List of airports in Texas
- List of airports in Utah
- List of airports in Vermont
- List of airports in Virginia
- List of airports in Washington
- List of airports in West Virginia
- List of airports in Wisconsin
- List of airports in Wyoming

=== Overseas territories ===
- List of airports in American Samoa
- List of airports in Guam
- List of airports in the Northern Mariana Islands
- List of airports in Puerto Rico
- List of airports in United States Virgin Islands
- List of airports in United States minor islands

== Primary airports ==
Airports in the United States that provide scheduled passenger services and have over 10,000 passenger boardings per year are classified as primary airports by the Federal Aviation Administration.

This list of primary airports contains the following information:

- CITY – The city generally associated with the airport. This is not always the actual location since some airports are located in smaller towns outside of the city they serve.
- FAA – The location identifier assigned by the Federal Aviation Administration (FAA). These are linked to that airport's page in the state's airport directory, where available.
- IATA – The airport code assigned by the International Air Transport Association (IATA). Those that do not match the FAA code are shown in bold.
- ICAO – The location indicator assigned by the International Civil Aviation Organization (ICAO).
- AIRPORT – The official airport name.
- ROLE – One of four FAA airport categories. This list only includes airports designated as Commercial service – primary (P). Each primary airport is further classified by the FAA as one of the following four "hub" types:
  - L: Large hub that accounts for at least 1% of total U.S. passenger enplanements (Generally 18,500,000 total passengers and above).
  - M: Medium hub that accounts for between 0.25% and 1% of total U.S. passenger enplanements (Generally 3,500,000-18,500,000 total passengers). This would make PDX a "Medium Hub" by total passengers, but a "Large Hub" under enplanements.
  - S: Small hub that accounts for between 0.05% and 0.25% of total U.S. passenger enplanements (Generally 500,000-3,500,000 total passengers).
  - N: Nonhub that accounts for less than 0.05% of total U.S. passenger enplanements, but more than 10,000 annual enplanements
- ENPLANEMENTS – The number of enplanements (commercial passenger boardings) that occurred at the airport in calendar year 2019 as per FAA records.

Primary airports: Alabama – Alaska – Arizona – Arkansas – California – Colorado – Connecticut – Delaware – Florida – Georgia – Hawaii – Idaho – Illinois – Indiana – Iowa – Kansas – Kentucky – Louisiana – Maine – Maryland – Massachusetts – Michigan – Minnesota – Mississippi – Missouri – Montana – Nebraska – Nevada – New Hampshire – New Jersey – New Mexico – New York – North Carolina – North Dakota – Ohio – Oklahoma – Oregon – Pennsylvania – Rhode Island – South Carolina – South Dakota – Tennessee – Texas – Utah – Vermont – Virginia – Washington – West Virginia – Wisconsin – Wyoming – Guam – Northern Mariana Islands – Puerto Rico – U.S. Virgin Islands

City	FAA	IATA	ICAO	Airport	Role	Enplanements
**ALABAMA**						
Birmingham	BHM	BHM	KBHM	**Birmingham–Shuttlesworth International Airport**	P-S	1,596,510
Dothan	DHN	DHN	KDHN	**Dothan Regional Airport**	P-N	39,339
Huntsville	HSV	HSV	KHSV	**Huntsville International Airport** (Carl T. Jones Field)	P-S	804,665
Mobile	MOB	MOB	KMOB	**Mobile Regional Airport**	P-N	314,406
Montgomery	MGM	MGM	KMGM	**Montgomery Regional Airport** (Dannelly Field)	P-N	193,746
**ALASKA**						
Anchorage	MRI	MRI	PAMR	**Merrill Field**	P-N	32,601
Anchorage	ANC	ANC	PANC	**Ted Stevens Anchorage International Airport**	P-M	2,767,856
Bethel	BET	BET	PABE	**Bethel Airport** (also see Bethel Seaplane Base)	P-N	165,846
Cordova	CDV	CDV	PACV	**Merle K. (Mudhole) Smith Airport**	P-N	18,641
Deadhorse	SCC	SCC	PASC	**Deadhorse Airport** (Prudhoe Bay Airport)	P-N	96,967
Dillingham	DLG	DLG	PADL	**Dillingham Airport**	P-N	34,656
Fairbanks	FAI	FAI	PAFA	**Fairbanks International Airport**	P-S	574,012
Gustavus	GST	GST	PAGS	**Gustavus Airport**	P-N	10,074
Homer	HOM	HOM	PAHO	**Homer Airport**	P-N	27,482
Juneau	JNU	JNU	PAJN	**Juneau International Airport**	P-N	436,457
Kenai	ENA	ENA	PAEN	**Kenai Municipal Airport**	P-N	75,395
Ketchikan	KTN	KTN	PAKT	**Ketchikan International Airport**	P-N	152,082
King Salmon	AKN	AKN	PAKN	**King Salmon Airport**	P-N	39,289
Klawock	AKW	**KLW**	PAKW	**Klawock Airport** (also see Klawock Seaplane Base)	P-N	16,224
Kodiak	ADQ	ADQ	PADQ	**Kodiak Airport** (Benny Benson State Airport)	P-N	86,579
Kotzebue	OTZ	OTZ	PAOT	**Ralph Wien Memorial Airport**	P-N	60,547
Nome	OME	OME	PAOM	**Nome Airport**	P-N	69,593
Petersburg	PSG	PSG	PAPG	**Petersburg James A. Johnson Airport**	P-N	25,209
Sitka	SIT	SIT	PASI	**Sitka Rocky Gutierrez Airport**	P-N	98,066
Unalaska	DUT	DUT	PADU	**Unalaska Airport** (Tom Madsen/Dutch Harbor Airport)	P-N	22,712
Utqiaġvik (Barrow)	BRW	BRW	PABR	**Wiley Post–Will Rogers Memorial Airport**	P-N	43,364
Wrangell	WRG	WRG	PAWG	**Wrangell Airport** (also see Wrangell Seaplane Base)	P-N	14,560
Yakutat	YAK	YAK	PAYA	**Yakutat Airport** (also see Yakutat Seaplane Base)	P-N	11,923
**ARIZONA**						
Flagstaff	FLG	FLG	KFLG	**Flagstaff Pulliam Airport**	P-N	79,081
Mesa	IWA	**AZA**	KIWA	**Mesa Gateway Airport** (formerly Williams AFB)	P-S	978,296
Page	PGA	PGA	KPGA	**Page Municipal Airport**	P-N	22,400
Phoenix	PHX	PHX	KPHX	**Phoenix Sky Harbor International Airport**	P-L	25,595,723
Prescott	PRC	PRC	KPRC	**Prescott Municipal Airport** (Ernest A. Love Field)	P-N	25,316
Tucson	TUS	TUS	KTUS	**Tucson International Airport**	P-S	1,959,789
Yuma	NYL	**YUM**	KNYL	**Yuma International Airport** / MCAS Yuma	P-N	85,227
**ARKANSAS**						
Fayetteville	XNA	XNA	KXNA	**Northwest Arkansas National Airport**	P-S	1,123,106
Fort Smith	FSM	FSM	KFSM	**Fort Smith Regional Airport**	P-N	59,250
Little Rock	LIT	LIT	KLIT	**Bill and Hillary Clinton National Airport** (Adams Field) (was Little Rock National)	P-S	1,145,693
Texarkana	TXK	TXK	KTXK	**Texarkana Regional Airport** (Webb Field)	P-N	36,307
**CALIFORNIA**						
Arcata/Eureka	ACV	ACV	KACV	**California Redwood Coast–Humboldt County Airport**	P-N	133,682
Bakersfield	BFL	BFL	KBFL	**Meadows Field**	P-N	195,148
Burbank	BUR	BUR	KBUR	**Hollywood Burbank Airport**	P-M	3,383,237
Fresno	FAT	FAT	KFAT	**Fresno Yosemite International Airport**	P-S	1,318,250
Long Beach	LGB	LGB	KLGB	**Long Beach Airport** (Daugherty Field)	P-S	2,031,810
Los Angeles	LAX	LAX	KLAX	**Los Angeles International Airport**	P-L	37,760,834
Monterey	MRY	MRY	KMRY	**Monterey Regional Airport**	P-N	305,434
Oakland	OAK	OAK	KOAK	**Oakland San Francisco Bay Airport**	P-M	5,292,736
Ontario	ONT	ONT	KONT	**Ontario International Airport**	P-M	3,494,554
Palm Springs	PSP	PSP	KPSP	**Palm Springs International Airport**	P-S	1,617,586
Redding	RDD	RDD	KRDD	**Redding Regional Airport**	P-N	88,676
Sacramento	SMF	SMF	KSMF	**Sacramento International Airport**	P-M	6,679,426
San Diego	SAN	SAN	KSAN	**San Diego International Airport**	P-L	12,780,013
San Francisco	SFO	SFO	KSFO	**San Francisco International Airport**	P-L	25,078,968
San Jose	SJC	SJC	KSJC	**San Jose International Airport**	P-M	5,822,019
San Luis Obispo	SBP	SBP	KSBP	**San Luis Obispo County Regional Airport** (McChesney Field)	P-N	366,428
Santa Ana	SNA	SNA	KSNA	**John Wayne Airport**	P-M	5,370,273
Santa Barbara	SBA	SBA	KSBA	**Santa Barbara Municipal Airport** (Santa Barbara Airport)	P-S	696,396
Santa Maria	SMX	SMX	KSMX	**Santa Maria Public Airport** (Capt G. Allan Hancock Field)	P-N	13,525
Santa Rosa	STS	STS	KSTS	**Charles M. Schulz–Sonoma County Airport**	P-N	382,556
Stockton	SCK	SCK	KSCK	**Stockton Metropolitan Airport**	P-N	63,668
**COLORADO**						
Alamosa	ALS	ALS	KALS	**San Luis Valley Regional Airport** (Bergman Field)	P-N	12,232
Aspen	ASE	ASE	KASE	**Aspen/Pitkin County Airport** (Sardy Field)	P-N	349,781
Colorado Springs	COS	COS	KCOS	**City of Colorado Springs Municipal Airport**	P-S	1,248,261
Denver	DEN	DEN	KDEN	**Denver International Airport**	P-L	40,012,895
Durango	DRO	DRO	KDRO	**Durango–La Plata County Airport**	P-N	250,640
Eagle/Vail	EGE	EGE	KEGE	**Eagle County Regional Airport**	P-N	282,849
Grand Junction	GJT	GJT	KGJT	**Grand Junction Regional Airport** (Walker Field)	P-N	270,935
Gunnison	GUC	GUC	KGUC	**Gunnison–Crested Butte Regional Airport**	P-N	58,804
Hayden	HDN	HDN	KHDN	**Yampa Valley Airport** (Yampa Valley Regional)	P-N	226,830
Montrose	MTJ	MTJ	KMTJ	**Montrose Regional Airport**	P-N	264,973
**CONNECTICUT**						
Hartford	BDL	BDL	KBDL	**Bradley International Airport**	P-M	3,285,194
New Haven	HVN	HVN	KHVN	**Tweed-New Haven Airport**	P-S	589,409
**DELAWARE**						
Wilmington	ILG	ILG	KILG	**Wilmington Airport**	P-N	125,071
**FLORIDA**						
Daytona Beach	DAB	DAB	KDAB	**Daytona Beach International Airport**	P-N	337,763
Fort Lauderdale	FLL	FLL	KFLL	**Fort Lauderdale–Hollywood International Airport**	P-L	17,096,131
Fort Lauderdale	FXE	FXE	KFXE	**Fort Lauderdale Executive Airport**	P-N	10,493
Fort Myers	RSW	RSW	KRSW	**Southwest Florida International Airport**	P-M	5,425,293
Fort Walton Beach	VPS	VPS	KVPS	**Destin–Fort Walton Beach Airport** / Eglin Air Force Base	P-S	1,164,880
Gainesville	GNV	GNV	KGNV	**Gainesville Regional Airport**	P-N	290,563
Jacksonville	JAX	JAX	KJAX	**Jacksonville International Airport**	P-M	3,749,791
Key West	EYW	EYW	KEYW	**Key West International Airport**	P-S	740,762
Melbourne	MLB	MLB	KMLB	**Melbourne Orlando International Airport**	P-N	348,283
Miami	MIA	MIA	KMIA	**Miami International Airport**	P-L	26,588,002
Orlando	MCO	MCO	KMCO	**Orlando International Airport**	P-L	27,859,783
Panama City	ECP	ECP	KECP	**Northwest Florida Beaches International Airport**	P-S	918,470
Pensacola	PNS	PNS	KPNS	**Pensacola International Airport**	P-S	1,528,204
Punta Gorda	PGD	PGD	KPGD	**Punta Gorda Airport**	P-S	957,136
Sanford	SFB	SFB	KSFB	**Orlando Sanford International Airport**	P-S	1,412,954
Sarasota	SRQ	SRQ	KSRQ	**Sarasota–Bradenton International Airport**	P-S	2,112,417
St. Petersburg	PIE	PIE	KPIE	**St. Pete–Clearwater International Airport**	P-S	1,228,048
Tallahassee	TLH	TLH	KTLH	**Tallahassee International Airport**	P-N	469,318
Tampa	TPA	TPA	KTPA	**Tampa International Airport**	P-L	12,075,591
Vero Beach	VRB	VRB	KVRB	**Vero Beach Regional Airport**	P-N	88,608
West Palm Beach	DJT	DJT	KDJT	**President Donald J. Trump International Airport**	P-M	4,127,211
**GEORGIA**						
Albany	ABY	ABY	KABY	**Southwest Georgia Regional Airport**	P-N	30,295
Atlanta	ATL	ATL	KATL	**Hartsfield–Jackson Atlanta International Airport**	P-L	52,511,402
Augusta	AGS	AGS	KAGS	**Augusta Regional Airport** (Bush Field)	P-N	299,141
Brunswick	BQK	BQK	KBQK	**Brunswick Golden Isles Airport**	P-N	42,771
Columbus	CSG	CSG	KCSG	**Columbus Airport**	P-N	63,422
Macon	MCN	MCN	KMCN	**Middle Georgia Regional Airport**	P-N	17,020
Savannah	SAV	SAV	KSAV	**Savannah/Hilton Head International Airport**	P-S	2,020,753
Valdosta	VLD	VLD	KVLD	**Valdosta Regional Airport**	P-N	46,744
**HAWAII**						
Hilo, Hawaii	ITO	ITO	PHTO	**Hilo International Airport**	P-S	680,640
Honolulu, Oahu	HNL	HNL	PHNL	**Daniel K. Inouye International Airport**	P-L	10,449,022
Kahului, Maui	OGG	OGG	PHOG	**Kahului Airport**	P-M	3,415,615
Kailua-Kona, Hawaii	KOA	KOA	PHKO	**Ellison Onizuka Kona International Airport at Keahole**	P-S	2,023,899
Kaunakakai, Molokai	MKK	MKK	PHMK	**Molokai Airport** (Hoolehua Airport)	P-N	84,029
Lanai City, Lanai	LNY	LNY	PHNY	**Lanai Airport**	P-N	25,186
Lihue, Kauai	LIH	LIH	PHLI	**Lihue Airport**	P-S	1,776,627
**IDAHO**						
Boise	BOI	BOI	KBOI	**Boise Airport** (Boise Air Terminal) (Gowen Field)	P-M	2,475,370
Hailey / Sun Valley	SUN	SUN	KSUN	**Friedman Memorial Airport**	P-N	121,123
Idaho Falls	IDA	IDA	KIDA	**Idaho Falls Regional Airport** (Fanning Field)	P-N	301,674
Lewiston	LWS	LWS	KLWS	**Lewiston–Nez Perce County Airport**	P-N	55,467
Pocatello	PIH	PIH	KPIH	**Pocatello Regional Airport**	P-N	24,610
Twin Falls	TWF	TWF	KTWF	**Magic Valley Regional Airport** (Joslin Field)	P-N	31,734
**ILLINOIS**						
Belleville	BLV	BLV	KBLV	**MidAmerica St. Louis Airport** / Scott Air Force Base	P-N	152,632
Bloomington / Normal	BMI	BMI	KBMI	**Central Illinois Regional Airport at Bloomington-Normal**	P-N	161,971
Champaign / Urbana / Savoy	CMI	CMI	KCMI	**University of Illinois - Willard Airport**	P-N	86,626
Chicago	MDW	MDW	KMDW	**Chicago Midway International Airport**	P-L	10,360,093
Chicago	ORD	ORD	KORD	**Chicago O'Hare International Airport**	P-L	38,575,693
Decatur	DEC	DEC	KDEC	**Decatur Airport**	P-N	12,747
Marion	MWA	MWA	KMWA	**Veterans Airport of Southern Illinois** (Williamson County Regional Airport)	P-N	13,816
Moline	MLI	MLI	KMLI	**Quad Cities International Airport**	P-N	326,888
Peoria	PIA	PIA	KPIA	**Peoria International Airport**	P-N	343,114
Rockford	RFD	RFD	KRFD	**Chicago Rockford International Airport** (was Northwest Chicagoland Regional Airport at Rockford)	P-N	132,154
Springfield	SPI	SPI	KSPI	**Abraham Lincoln Capital Airport**	P-N	51,784
**INDIANA**						
Evansville	EVV	EVV	KEVV	**Evansville Regional Airport**	P-N	189,706
Fort Wayne	FWA	FWA	KFWA	**Fort Wayne International Airport**	P-N	424,491
Indianapolis	IND	IND	KIND	**Indianapolis International Airport**	P-M	5,181,947
South Bend	SBN	SBN	KSBN	**South Bend International Airport**	P-N	454,920
**IOWA**						
Cedar Rapids	CID	CID	KCID	**Eastern Iowa Airport**	P-S	759,978
Des Moines	DSM	DSM	KDSM	**Des Moines International Airport**	P-S	1,555,454
Dubuque	DBQ	DBQ	KDBQ	**Dubuque Regional Airport**	P-N	6,078
Sioux City	SUX	SUX	KSUX	**Sioux Gateway Airport** (Brig. General Bud Day Field)	P-N	28,299
Waterloo	ALO	ALO	KALO	**Waterloo Regional Airport**	P-N	12,006
**KANSAS**						
Garden City	GCK	GCK	KGCK	**Garden City Regional Airport**	P-N	31,167
Hays	HYS	HYS	KHYS	**Hays Regional Airport**	P-N	15,002
Manhattan	MHK	MHK	KMHK	**Manhattan Regional Airport**	P-N	85,901
Salina	SLN	SLN	KSLN	**Salina Regional Airport**	P-N	23,456
Wichita	ICT	ICT	KICT	**Wichita Dwight D. Eisenhower National Airport** (was Wichita Mid-Continent Airport)	P-S	885,585
**KENTUCKY**						
Cincinnati/Covington	CVG	CVG	KCVG	**Cincinnati/Northern Kentucky International Airport**	P-M	4,500,414
Lexington	LEX	LEX	KLEX	**Blue Grass Airport**	P-S	776,297
Louisville	SDF	SDF	KSDF	**Louisville Muhammad Ali International Airport** (Standiford Field)	P-S	2,343,305
Owensboro	OWB	OWB	KOWB	**Owensboro–Daviess County Regional Airport**	P-N	8,835
Paducah	PAH	PAH	KPAH	**Barkley Regional Airport**	P-N	13,456
**LOUISIANA**						
Alexandria	AEX	AEX	KAEX	**Alexandria International Airport**	P-N	204,603
Baton Rouge	BTR	BTR	KBTR	**Baton Rouge Metropolitan Airport** (Ryan Field)	P-N	419,446
Lafayette	LFT	LFT	KLFT	**Lafayette Regional Airport** (Paul Fournet Field)	P-N	264,471
Lake Charles	LCH	LCH	KLCH	**Lake Charles Regional Airport**	P-N	90,791
Monroe	MLU	MLU	KMLU	**Monroe Regional Airport**	P-N	105,274
New Orleans	MSY	MSY	KMSY	**Louis Armstrong New Orleans International Airport**	P-M	6,537,092
Shreveport	SHV	SHV	KSHV	**Shreveport Regional Airport**	P-N	352,281
**MAINE**						
Bangor	BGR	BGR	KBGR	**Bangor International Airport**	P-N	376,456
Portland	PWM	PWM	KPWM	**Portland International Jetport**	P-S	1,221,913
Presque Isle	PQI	PQI	KPQI	**Presque Isle International Airport**	P-N	21,633
Rockland	RKD	RKD	KRKD	**Knox County Regional Airport**	P-N	13,309
**MARYLAND**						
Baltimore	BWI	BWI	KBWI	**Baltimore/Washington International Airport**	P-L	13,221,461
Hagerstown	HGR	HGR	KHGR	**Hagerstown Regional Airport** (Richard A. Henson Field)	P-N	41,508
Salisbury	SBY	SBY	KSBY	**Salisbury Regional Airport**	P-N	60,442
**MASSACHUSETTS**						
Boston	BOS	BOS	KBOS	**Gen. Edward Lawrence Logan International Airport**	P-L	21,090,721
Hyannis	HYA	HYA	KHYA	**Cape Cod Gateway Airport** (Boardman/Polando Field)	P-N	25,626
Nantucket	ACK	ACK	KACK	**Nantucket Memorial Airport**	P-N	154,173
Vineyard Haven	MVY	MVY	KMVY	**Martha's Vineyard Airport**	P-N	83,419
Worcester	ORH	ORH	KORH	**Worcester Regional Airport**	P-N	112,872
**MICHIGAN**						
Alpena	APN	APN	KAPN	**Alpena County Regional Airport**	P-N	11,150
Detroit	DTW	DTW	KDTW	**Detroit Metro Wayne County Airport**	P-L	16,110,696
Escanaba	ESC	ESC	KESC	**Delta County Airport**	P-N	17,120
Flint	FNT	FNT	KFNT	**Bishop International Airport**	P-N	285,088
Grand Rapids	GRR	GRR	KGRR	**Gerald R. Ford International Airport**	P-S	2,065,053
Hancock	CMX	CMX	KCMX	**Houghton County Memorial Airport**	P-N	25,833
Iron Mountain	IMT	IMT	KIMT	**Ford Airport**	P-N	19,483
Kalamazoo	AZO	AZO	KAZO	**Kalamazoo/Battle Creek International Airport**	P-N	92,510
Lansing	LAN	LAN	KLAN	**Capital Region International Airport** (was Lansing Capital City)	P-N	123,608
Marquette	SAW	**MQT**	KSAW	**Marquette Sawyer Regional Airport**	P-N	44,574
Muskegon	MKG	MKG	KMKG	**Muskegon County Airport**	P-N	2,729
Pellston	PLN	PLN	KPLN	**Pellston Regional/Emmet County Airport**	P-N	31,060
Saginaw	MBS	MBS	KMBS	**MBS International Airport**	P-N	110,822
Sault Ste. Marie	CIU	CIU	KCIU	**Chippewa County International Airport**	P-N	26,482
Traverse City	TVC	TVC	KTVC	**Cherry Capital Airport** (was Cherry County Airpark)	P-N	393,108
**MINNESOTA**						
Bemidji	BJI	BJI	KBJI	**Bemidji Regional Airport**	P-N	28,536
Brainerd	BRD	BRD	KBRD	**Brainerd Lakes Regional Airport**	P-N	16,255
Duluth	DLH	DLH	KDLH	**Duluth International Airport**	P-N	135,966
Hibbing	HIB	HIB	KHIB	**Range Regional Airport** (formerly Chisholm–Hibbing Municipal Airport)	P-N	11,294
Minneapolis–Saint Paul	MSP	MSP	KMSP	**Minneapolis–Saint Paul International Airport** (Wold-Chamberlain Field)	P-L	18,054,481
Rochester	RST	RST	KRST	**Rochester International Airport**	P-N	98,537
St. Cloud	STC	STC	KSTC	**St. Cloud Regional Airport**	P-N	23,885
**MISSISSIPPI**						
Columbus	GTR	GTR	KGTR	**Golden Triangle Regional Airport**	P-N	47,323
Gulfport / Biloxi	GPT	GPT	KGPT	**Gulfport–Biloxi International Airport**	P-N	424,624
Hattiesburg / Laurel	PIB	PIB	KPIB	**Hattiesburg–Laurel Regional Airport**	P-N	15,575
Jackson	JAN	JAN	KJAN	**Jackson–Medgar Wiley Evers International Airport**	P-S	616,695
Meridian	MEI	MEI	KMEI	**Key Field**	P-N	17,003
Tupelo	TUP	TUP	KTUP	**Tupelo Regional Airport** (C.D. Lemons Field)	P-N	16,194
**MISSOURI**						
Branson	BBG	**BKG**	KBBG	Branson Airport	P-N	2,856
Columbia	COU	COU	KCOU	**Columbia Regional Airport**	P-N	103,081
Fort Leonard Wood / Waynesville	TBN	TBN	KTBN	**Waynesville–St. Robert Regional Airport** (Forney Field)	P-N	11,276
Joplin	JLN	JLN	KJLN	**Joplin Regional Airport**	P-N	18,362
Kansas City	MCI	MCI	KMCI	**Kansas City International Airport** (was Mid-Continent International)	P-M	5,915,078
St. Louis	STL	STL	KSTL	**St. Louis Lambert International Airport**	P-M	7,807,362
Springfield/Branson	SGF	SGF	KSGF	**Springfield–Branson National Airport**	P-S	702,338
**MONTANA**						
Billings	BIL	BIL	KBIL	**Billings Logan International Airport**	P-S	475,334
Bozeman	BZN	BZN	KBZN	**Bozeman Yellowstone International Airport** (was Gallatin Field)	P-S	1,321,790
Butte	BTM	BTM	KBTM	**Bert Mooney Airport**	P-N	15,773
Great Falls	GTF	GTF	KGTF	**Great Falls International Airport**	P-N	186,778
Helena	HLN	HLN	KHLN	**Helena Regional Airport**	P-N	101,591
Kalispell	GPI	**FCA**	KGPI	**Glacier Park International Airport**	P-S	503,816
Missoula	MSO	MSO	KMSO	**Missoula Montana Airport** (was Missoula International Airport)	P-S	511,553
West Yellowstone	WYS	WYS	KWYS	**Yellowstone Airport**	P-N	9,569
**NEBRASKA**						
Grand Island	GRI	GRI	KGRI	**Central Nebraska Regional Airport**	P-N	67,747
Kearney	EAR	EAR	KEAR	**Kearney Regional Airport** (was Kearney Municipal)	P-N	14,130
Lincoln	LNK	LNK	KLNK	**Lincoln Airport** (was Lincoln Municipal)	P-N	129,968
North Platte	LBF	LBF	KLBF	**North Platte Regional Airport** (Lee Bird Field)	P-N	16,537
Omaha	OMA	OMA	KOMA	**Eppley Airfield**	P-M	2,583,212
Scottsbluff	BFF	BFF	KBFF	**Western Nebraska Regional Airport** (William B. Heilig Field)	P-N	13,841
**NEVADA**						
Boulder City	BVU	**BLD**	KBVU	Boulder City Municipal Airport	P-N	59,617
Elko	EKO	EKO	KEKO	**Elko Regional Airport** (J.C. Harris Field)	P-N	12,881
Las Vegas	LAS	LAS	KLAS	**Harry Reid International Airport**	P-L	28,244,966
Reno	RNO	RNO	KRNO	**Reno/Tahoe International Airport**	P-S	2,377,780
**NEW HAMPSHIRE**						
Manchester	MHT	MHT	KMHT	**Manchester–Boston Regional Airport**	P-S	633,257
Portsmouth	PSM	PSM	KPSM	**Portsmouth International Airport at Pease**	P-N	100,298
**NEW JERSEY**						
Atlantic City	ACY	ACY	KACY	**Atlantic City International Airport**	P-S	489,848
Newark	EWR	EWR	KEWR	**Newark Liberty International Airport**	P-L	24,544,320
Trenton	TTN	TTN	KTTN	**Trenton–Mercer Airport**	P-N	241,950
**NEW MEXICO**						
Albuquerque	ABQ	ABQ	KABQ	**Albuquerque International Sunport**	P-M	2,690,218
Hobbs	HOB	HOB	KHOB	**Lea County Regional Airport**	P-N	26,212
Roswell	ROW	ROW	KROW	**Roswell Air Center**	P-N	48,740
Santa Fe	SAF	SAF	KSAF	**Santa Fe Municipal Airport**	P-N	180,248
**NEW YORK**						
Albany	ALB	ALB	KALB	**Albany International Airport**	P-S	1,490,673
Binghamton	BGM	BGM	KBGM	**Greater Binghamton Airport** (Edwin A. Link Field)	P-N	24,496
Buffalo	BUF	BUF	KBUF	**Buffalo Niagara International Airport**	P-S	2,499,295
Elmira / Corning	ELM	ELM	KELM	**Elmira/Corning Regional Airport**	P-N	85,696
Ithaca	ITH	ITH	KITH	**Ithaca Tompkins International Airport**	P-N	69,613
New York	JFK	JFK	KJFK	**John F. Kennedy International Airport** (was New York International Airport)	P-L	31,466,102
New York	LGA	LGA	KLGA	**LaGuardia Airport** (and Marine Air Terminal)	P-L	16,715,567
Islip / Brookhaven	ISP	ISP	KISP	**Long Island MacArthur Airport**	P-S	682,804
Newburgh	SWF	SWF	KSWF	**New York Stewart International Airport**	P-N	143,310
Niagara Falls	IAG	IAG	KIAG	**Niagara Falls International Airport**	P-N	59,119
Ogdensburg	OGS	OGS	KOGS	**Ogdensburg International Airport**	P-N	6,269
Plattsburgh	PBG	PBG	KPBG	**Plattsburgh International Airport**	P-N	92,960
Rochester	ROC	ROC	KROC	**Frederick Douglass/Greater Rochester International Airport**	P-S	1,331,837
Syracuse	SYR	SYR	KSYR	**Syracuse Hancock International Airport**	P-S	1,486,554
Watertown	ART	ART	KART	**Watertown International Airport**	P-N	23,188
White Plains	HPN	HPN	KHPN	**Westchester County Airport**	P-S	1,182,394
**NORTH CAROLINA**						
Asheville	AVL	AVL	KAVL	**Asheville Regional Airport**	P-S	1,096,465
Charlotte	CLT	CLT	KCLT	**Charlotte Douglas International Airport**	P-L	28,523,822
Concord	JQF	USA	KJQF	**Concord–Padgett Regional Airport**	P-N	132,000
Fayetteville	FAY	FAY	KFAY	**Fayetteville Regional Airport** (Grannis Field)	P-N	168,117
Greensboro	GSO	GSO	KGSO	**Piedmont Triad International Airport**	P-S	985,563
Greenville	PGV	PGV	KPGV	**Pitt–Greenville Airport**	P-N	42,318
Jacksonville	OAJ	OAJ	KOAJ	**Albert J. Ellis Airport**	P-N	145,901
New Bern	EWN	EWN	KEWN	**Coastal Carolina Regional Airport** (was Craven County Regional)	P-N	86,653
Raleigh	RDU	RDU	KRDU	**Raleigh–Durham International Airport**	P-M	7,584,394
Wilmington	ILM	ILM	KILM	**Wilmington International Airport**	P-S	737,065
**NORTH DAKOTA**						
Bismarck	BIS	BIS	KBIS	**Bismarck Municipal Airport**	P-N	295,900
Dickinson	DIK	DIK	KDIK	**Dickinson Theodore Roosevelt Regional Airport**	P-N	26,146
Fargo	FAR	FAR	KFAR	**Hector International Airport**	P-S	552,860
Grand Forks	GFK	GFK	KGFK	**Grand Forks International Airport**	P-N	92,482
Jamestown	JMS	JMS	KJMS	**Jamestown Regional Airport**	P-N	9,516
Minot	MOT	MOT	KMOT	**Minot International Airport**	P-N	169,463
Williston	XWA	XWA	KXWA	**Williston Basin International Airport**	P-N	99,735
**OHIO**						
Akron / Canton	CAK	CAK	KCAK	**Akron–Canton Airport**	P-N	380,232
Cleveland	CLE	CLE	KCLE	**Cleveland Hopkins International Airport**	P-M	4,950,345
Columbus	CMH	CMH	KCMH	**John Glenn Columbus International Airport**	P-M	4,387,395
Columbus	LCK	LCK	KLCK	**Rickenbacker International Airport**	P-N	143,035
Dayton	DAY	DAY	KDAY	**James M. Cox Dayton International Airport**	P-S	624,995
Toledo	TOL	TOL	KTOL	**Eugene F. Kranz Toledo Express Airport**	P-N	66,614
**OKLAHOMA**						
Lawton	LAW	LAW	KLAW	**Lawton–Fort Sill Regional Airport**	P-N	45,031
Oklahoma City	OKC	OKC	KOKC	**OKC Will Rogers International Airport**	P-S	2,243,575
Stillwater	SWO	SWO	KSWO	**Stillwater Regional Airport**	P-N	34,729
Tulsa	TUL	TUL	KTUL	**Tulsa International Airport**	P-S	1,627,181
**OREGON**						
Eugene	EUG	EUG	KEUG	**Mahlon Sweet Field**	P-S	824,952
Medford	MFR	MFR	KMFR	**Rogue Valley International–Medford Airport**	P-S	503,733
North Bend	OTH	OTH	KOTH	**Southwest Oregon Regional Airport** (was North Bend Municipal)	P-N	20,945
Portland	PDX	PDX	KPDX	**Portland International Airport**	P-M	8,639,088
Redmond	RDM	RDM	KRDM	**Roberts Field**	P-S	601,152
**PENNSYLVANIA**						
Allentown	ABE	ABE	KABE	**Lehigh Valley International Airport**	P-S	468,130
Altoona	AOO	AOO	KAOO	**Altoona–Blair County Airport**	P-N	10,616
Erie	ERI	ERI	KERI	**Erie International Airport**	P-N	65,380
Harrisburg	MDT	MDT	KMDT	**Harrisburg International Airport**	P-S	803,428
Johnstown	JST	JST	KJST	**John Murtha Johnstown–Cambria County Airport**	P-N	19,341
Lancaster	LNS	LNS	KLNS	**Lancaster Airport**	P-N	18,573
Latrobe	LBE	LBE	KLBE	**Arnold Palmer Regional Airport**	P-N	59,578
Philadelphia	PHL	PHL	KPHL	**Philadelphia International Airport**	P-L	12,754,034
Pittsburgh	PIT	PIT	KPIT	**Pittsburgh International Airport**	P-M	4,668,137
State College	UNV	**SCE**	KUNV	**State College Regional Airport**	P-N	147,911
Wilkes-Barre / Scranton	AVP	AVP	KAVP	**Wilkes-Barre/Scranton International Airport**	P-N	221,803
**RHODE ISLAND**						
Block Island	BID	BID	KBID	**Block Island State Airport**	P-N	11,867
Providence	PVD	PVD	KPVD	**Rhode Island T. F. Green International Airport**	P-S	1,984,916
Westerly	WST	WST	KWST	**Westerly State Airport**	P-N	12,320
**SOUTH CAROLINA**						
Charleston	CHS	CHS	KCHS	**Charleston International Airport** / Charleston AFB	P-M	3,115,194
Columbia	CAE	CAE	KCAE	**Columbia Metropolitan Airport**	P-S	654,460
Florence	FLO	FLO	KFLO	**Florence Regional Airport**	P-N	24,728
Greenville	GSP	GSP	KGSP	**Greenville–Spartanburg International Airport** (Roger Milliken Field)	P-S	1,412,702
Hilton Head	HXD	HHH	KHXD	**Hilton Head Airport**	P-N	108,775
Myrtle Beach	MYR	MYR	KMYR	**Myrtle Beach International Airport**	P-S	1,894,929
**SOUTH DAKOTA**						
Aberdeen	ABR	ABR	KABR	**Aberdeen Regional Airport**	P-N	23,705
Pierre	PIR	PIR	KPIR	**Pierre Regional Airport**	P-N	14,887
Rapid City	RAP	RAP	KRAP	**Rapid City Regional Airport**	P-S	418,183
Sioux Falls	FSD	FSD	KFSD	**Sioux Falls Regional Airport** (Joe Foss Field)	P-S	701,353
Watertown	ATY	ATY	KATY	**Watertown Regional Airport**	P-N	12,064
**TENNESSEE**						
Chattanooga	CHA	CHA	KCHA	**Chattanooga Metropolitan Airport** (Lovell Field)	P-S	557,741
Knoxville	TYS	TYS	KTYS	**McGhee Tyson Airport**	P-S	1,639,080
Memphis	MEM	MEM	KMEM	**Memphis International Airport**	P-M	2,439,366
Nashville	BNA	BNA	KBNA	**Nashville International Airport** (Berry Field)	P-L	12,058,688
Tri-Cities	TRI	TRI	KTRI	**Tri-Cities Airport**	P-N	229,860
**TEXAS**						
Abilene	ABI	ABI	KABI	**Abilene Regional Airport**	P-N	94,579
Amarillo	AMA	AMA	KAMA	**Rick Husband Amarillo International Airport**	P-N	402,315
Austin	AUS	AUS	KAUS	**Austin–Bergstrom International Airport**	P-L	10,678,073
Beaumont	BPT	BPT	KBPT	**Jack Brooks Regional Airport** (was Southeast Texas Regional)	P-N	33,907
Brownsville	BRO	BRO	KBRO	**Brownsville/South Padre Island International Airport**	P-N	188,157
College Station	CLL	CLL	KCLL	**Easterwood Field**	P-N	68,316
Corpus Christi	CRP	CRP	KCRP	**Corpus Christi International Airport**	P-N	369,393
Dallas	DAL	DAL	KDAL	**Dallas Love Field**	P-M	8,654,991
Dallas–Fort Worth	DFW	DFW	KDFW	**Dallas Fort Worth International Airport**	P-L	42,351,316
Del Rio	DRT	DRT	KDRT	Del Rio International Airport	P-N	0
El Paso	ELP	ELP	KELP	**El Paso International Airport**	P-S	2,071,894
Harlingen	HRL	HRL	KHRL	**Valley International Airport**	P-S	603,561
Houston	IAH	IAH	KIAH	**George Bush Intercontinental/Houston Airport**	P-L	23,349,157
Houston	HOU	HOU	KHOU	**William P. Hobby Airport**	P-M	7,116,967
Killeen	GRK	GRK	KGRK	**Killeen Regional Airport** / Robert Gray Army Airfield	P-N	117,523
Laredo	LRD	LRD	KLRD	**Laredo International Airport**	P-N	172,726
Longview	GGG	GGG	KGGG	**East Texas Regional Airport**	P-N	35,057
Lubbock	LBB	LBB	KLBB	**Lubbock Preston Smith International Airport**	P-S	563,180
McAllen	MFE	MFE	KMFE	**McAllen Miller International Airport**	P-S	625,670
Midland / Odessa	MAF	MAF	KMAF	**Midland International Air and Space Port**	P-S	761,865
San Angelo	SJT	SJT	KSJT	**San Angelo Regional Airport** (Mathis Field)	P-N	49,493
San Antonio	SAT	SAT	KSAT	**San Antonio International Airport**	P-M	5,466,684
Tyler	TYR	TYR	KTYR	**Tyler Pounds Regional Airport**	P-N	51,296
Waco	ACT	ACT	KACT	**Waco Regional Airport**	P-N	53,849
Wichita Falls	SPS	SPS	KSPS	**Wichita Falls Municipal Airport** / Sheppard Air Force Base	P-N	29,702
**UTAH**						
Cedar City	CDC	CDC	KCDC	**Cedar City Regional Airport**	P-N	11,855
Moab	CNY	CNY	KCNY	**Canyonlands Regional Airport**	P-N	10,625
Ogden	OGD	OGD	KOGD	**Ogden–Hinckley Airport**	P-N	15,582
Provo	PVU	PVU	KPVU	**Provo Municipal Airport**	P-N	455,219
St. George	SGU	SGU	KSGU	**St. George Regional Airport**	P-N	161,201
Salt Lake City	SLC	SLC	KSLC	**Salt Lake City International Airport**	P-L	13,543,570
**VERMONT**						
Burlington	BTV	BTV	KBTV	**Patrick Leahy Burlington International Airport**	P-S	670,636
**VIRGINIA**						
Charlottesville	CHO	CHO	KCHO	**Charlottesville–Albemarle Airport**	P-N	351,138
Highland Springs	RIC	RIC	KRIC	**Richmond International Airport** (Byrd Field)	P-S	2,456,422
Newport News	PHF	PHF	KPHF	**Newport News/Williamsburg International Airport** (Patrick Henry Field)	P-N	68,787
Norfolk	ORF	ORF	KORF	**Norfolk International Airport**	P-S	2,444,897
Roanoke	ROA	ROA	KROA	**Roanoke–Blacksburg Regional Airport** (Woodrum Field)	P-N	382,103
Staunton / Waynesboro / Harrisonburg	SHD	SHD	KSHD	**Shenandoah Valley Regional Airport**	P-N	8,762
Timberlake	LYH	LYH	KLYH	**Lynchburg Regional Airport** (Preston Glenn Field)	P-N	81,477
Washington, D.C. / Arlington	DCA	DCA	KDCA	**Ronald Reagan Washington National Airport**	P-L	12,750,892
Washington, D.C. / Dulles / Chantilly	IAD	IAD	KIAD	**Dulles International Airport**	P-L	13,003,234
**WASHINGTON**						
Bellingham	BLI	BLI	KBLI	**Bellingham International Airport**	P-N	266,703
Eastsound	ORS	**ESD**	KORS	**Orcas Island Airport**	P-N	9,512
Everett	PAE	PAE	KPAE	**Paine Field** (Snohomish County Airport)	P-N	275,996
Friday Harbor	FHR	**FRD**	KFHR	**Friday Harbor Airport**	P-N	12,898
Pasco	PSC	PSC	KPSC	**Tri-Cities Airport**	P-S	476,639
Pullman / Moscow, Idaho	PUW	PUW	KPUW	**Pullman–Moscow Regional Airport**	P-N	64,580
Seattle	BFI	BFI	KBFI	**King County International Airport** (Boeing Field)	P-N	28,769
Seattle / Tacoma (SeaTac)	SEA	SEA	KSEA	**Seattle–Tacoma International Airport**	P-L	25,414,592
Spokane	GEG	GEG	KGEG	**Spokane International Airport** (Geiger Field)	P-S	2,064,412
Walla Walla	ALW	ALW	KALW	**Walla Walla Regional Airport**	P-N	36,873
Wenatchee	EAT	EAT	KEAT	**Pangborn Memorial Airport**	P-N	44,459
Yakima	YKM	YKM	KYKM	**Yakima Air Terminal** (McAllister Field)	P-N	41,471
**WEST VIRGINIA**						
Charleston	CRW	CRW	KCRW	**Yeager Airport**	P-N	202,303
Clarksburg	CKB	CKB	KCKB	**North Central West Virginia Airport** (was Harrison-Marion Regional)	P-N	42,288
Huntington	HTS	HTS	KHTS	**Tri-State Airport** (Milton J. Ferguson Field)	P-N	93,330
**WISCONSIN**						
Appleton / Fox Cities	ATW	ATW	KATW	**Appleton International Airport**	P-S	540,349
Eau Claire	EAU	EAU	KEAU	**Chippewa Valley Regional Airport**	P-N	22,289
Green Bay	GRB	GRB	KGRB	**Green Bay–Austin Straubel International Airport**	P-N	338,127
La Crosse	LSE	LSE	KLSE	**La Crosse Regional Airport**	P-N	40,608
Madison	MSN	MSN	KMSN	**Dane County Regional Airport** (Truax Field)	P-S	1,156,399
Milwaukee	MKE	MKE	KMKE	**Milwaukee Mitchell International Airport**	P-M	3,104,054
Mosinee	CWA	CWA	KCWA	**Central Wisconsin Airport**	P-N	90,087
Rhinelander	RHI	RHI	KRHI	**Rhinelander–Oneida County Airport**	P-N	24,826
**WYOMING**						
Casper	CPR	CPR	KCPR	**Casper–Natrona County International Airport**	P-N	99,658
Cheyenne	CYS	CYS	KCYS	**Cheyenne Regional Airport** (Jerry Olson Field)	P-N	27,602
Cody	COD	COD	KCOD	**Yellowstone Regional Airport**	P-N	37,437
Gillette	GCC	GCC	KGCC	**Gillette–Campbell County Airport**	P-N	30,321
Jackson	JAC	JAC	KJAC	**Jackson Hole Airport**	P-S	518,754
Laramie	LAR	LAR	KLAR	**Laramie Regional Airport**	P-N	19,061
Riverton	RIW	RIW	KRIW	**Central Wyoming Regional Airport** (was Riverton Regional)	P-N	21,624
Rock Springs	RKS	RKS	KRKS	**Southwest Wyoming Regional Airport** (Rock Springs–Sweetwater County Airport)	P-N	21,541
Sheridan	SHR	SHR	KSHR	**Sheridan County Airport**	P-N	29,471
**GUAM**						
Agana / Tamuning	GUM	GUM	PGUM	**Antonio B. Won Pat International Airport**	P-N	932,832
**NORTHERN MARIANAS**						
Obyan, Saipan Island	GSN	**SPN**	PGSN	**Saipan International Airport** (Francisco C. Ada)	P-N	234,042
Tinian Island	TNI	**TIQ**	PGWT	**Tinian International Airport** (West Tinian)	P-N	30,538
**PUERTO RICO**						
Aguadilla	BQN	BQN	TJBQ	**Rafael Hernández Airport**	P-N	360,345
Ceiba	RVR	NRR	TJRV	**José Aponte de la Torre Airport**	P-N	19,681
Culebra	CPX	CPX	TJCP	**Benjamín Rivera Noriega Airport**	P-N	14,663
Ponce	PSE	PSE	TJPS	**Mercedita Airport**	P-N	137,553
San Juan	SIG	SIG	TJIG	**Fernando Luis Ribas Dominicci Airport**	P-N	16,844
San Juan	SJU	SJU	TJSJ	**Luis Muñoz Marín International Airport**	P-M	6,490,669
Vieques	VQS	VQS	TJVQ	**Antonio Rivera Rodríguez Airport**	P-N	37,756
**U.S. VIRGIN ISLANDS**						
Charlotte Amalie, St. Thomas	STT	STT	TIST	**Cyril E. King Airport**	P-S	821,945
Christiansted, St. Croix	STX	STX	TISX	**Henry E. Rohlsen Airport**	P-N	265,243

== See also ==
- List of the busiest airports in the United States
- List of airports serving Washington, D.C.
- Lists of airports
- Essential Air Service
- Wikipedia:WikiProject Aviation/Airline destination lists: North America#United States of America
