= List of airports in Wyoming =

This is a list of airports in Wyoming (a U.S. state), grouped by type and sorted by location. It contains all public-use and military airports in the state. Some private-use and former airports may be included where notable, such as airports that were previously public-use, those with commercial enplanements recorded by the FAA or airports assigned an IATA airport code.

== Airports ==
This list contains the following information:

- **City served** – The city generally associated with the airport, as per the airport's master record with the Federal Aviation Administration. This is not always the actual location since some airports are located in smaller towns outside of the city they serve. It is not meant to be a complete list of cities served, which can be found in or added to each airport's Wikipedia article.
- **FAA** – The location identifier assigned by the Federal Aviation Administration (FAA).
- **IATA** – The airport code assigned by the International Air Transport Association (IATA). Those that do not match the FAA code are shown in bold.
- **ICAO** – The location indicator assigned by the International Civil Aviation Organization (ICAO).
- **Airport name** – The official airport name. Those shown in **bold** indicate the airport has scheduled passenger service on commercial airlines.
- **Role** – One of four FAA airport categories, as per the 2025–2029 National Plan of Integrated Airport Systems (NPIAS) report released October 2024:
  - P-s: Commercial service – primary are publicly owned airports that receive scheduled passenger service and have more than 10,000 passenger boardings (enplanements) each year. Each primary airport is sub-classified by the FAA as one of the following four "hub" types (s):
    - L: Large hub that accounts for at least 1% of total U.S. passenger enplanements.
    - M: Medium hub that accounts for between 0.25% and 1% of total U.S. passenger enplanements.
    - S: Small hub that accounts for between 0.05% and 0.25% of total U.S. passenger enplanements.
    - N: Nonhub that accounts for less than 0.05% of total U.S. passenger enplanements, but more than 10,000 annual enplanements.
  - CS: Commercial service – nonprimary are publicly owned airports that receive scheduled passenger service and have at least 2,500 passenger boardings each year.
  - R: Reliever airports are designated by the FAA to relieve congestion at a large commercial service airport and to provide more general aviation access to the overall community.
  - GA: General aviation airports are the largest single group of airports in the U.S. airport system. They are public-use airports that do not have scheduled service or have scheduled service with less than 2,500 passenger boardings each year.
- **Enplanements** – The number of enplanements (commercial passenger boardings) that occurred at the airport in calendar year 2023, as per FAA records released October 2024.

City served	FAA	IATA	ICAO	Airport name	Role	Enplanements (2024)
				**Commercial service – primary airports**		
Casper	CPR	CPR	KCPR	**Casper–Natrona County International Airport**	P-N	99,658
Cheyenne	CYS	CYS	KCYS	**Cheyenne Regional Airport** (Jerry Olson Field)	P-N	27,602
Cody	COD	COD	KCOD	**Yellowstone Regional Airport**	P-N	37,437
Gillette	GCC	GCC	KGCC	**Gillette–Campbell County Airport**	P-N	30,321
Jackson	JAC	JAC	KJAC	**Jackson Hole Airport**	P-S	518,754
Laramie	LAR	LAR	KLAR	**Laramie Regional Airport**	P-N	19,061
Riverton	RIW	RIW	KRIW	**Central Wyoming Regional Airport** (was Riverton Regional)	P-N	21,624
Rock Springs	RKS	RKS	KRKS	**Southwest Wyoming Regional Airport** (Rock Springs–Sweetwater County Airport)	P-N	21,541
Sheridan	SHR	SHR	KSHR	**Sheridan County Airport**	P-N	29,471
				**General aviation airports**		
Afton	AFO	AFO	KAFO	Afton Municipal Airport	GA	5
Big Piney / Marbleton	BPI	BPI	KBPI	Miley Memorial Field (was Big Piney / Marbleton)	GA	0
Buffalo	BYG	BYG	KBYG	Johnson County Airport	GA	2
Cowley / Lovell / Byron	U68			North Big Horn County Airport	GA	0
Dixon	DWX			Dixon Airport	GA	4
Douglas	DGW	DGW	KDGW	Converse County Airport	GA	6
Dubois	DUB		KDUB	Dubois Municipal Airport	GA	0
Evanston	EVW	EVW	KEVW	Evanston-Uinta County Airport (Burns Field)	GA	0
Fort Bridger / Lyman	FBR	FBR	KFBR	Fort Bridger Airport	GA	0
Greybull	GEY	GEY	KGEY	South Big Horn County Airport	GA	0
Hulett	W43			Hulett Municipal Airport	GA	0
Kemmerer	EMM	EMM	KEMM	Kemmerer Municipal Airport	GA	0
Lander	LND	LND	KLND	Hunt Field	GA	0
Lusk	LSK	LSK	KLSK	Lusk Municipal Airport	GA	0
Newcastle	ECS	ECS	KECS	Mondell Field	GA	0
Pine Bluffs	82V			Pine Bluffs Municipal Airport	GA	0
Pinedale	PNA	**PWY**	KPNA	Ralph Wenz Field	GA	25
Powell	POY	POY	KPOY	Powell Municipal Airport	GA	0
Rawlins	RWL	RWL	KRWL	Rawlins Municipal Airport (Harvey Field)	GA	0
Saratoga	SAA	SAA	KSAA	Shively Field	GA	78
Thermopolis	HSG	**THP**	KHSG	Hot Springs County-Thermopolis Municipal Airport	GA	2
Torrington	TOR	TOR	KTOR	Torrington Municipal Airport	GA	8
Wheatland	EAN	EAN	KEAN	Phifer Airfield	GA	0
Worland	WRL	WRL	KWRL	Worland Municipal Airport	GA	0
				**Other public use airports** (not listed in NPIAS)		
Alpine	46U			Alpine Airport		
Casper	HAD		KHAD	Harford Field (was Harford Airport)		
Cokeville	U06			Cokeville Municipal Airport		
Glendo	76V			Thomas Memorial Airport		
Green River	48U			Greater Green River Intergalactic Spaceport		
Guernsey	GUR		KGUR	Camp Guernsey Airport		
Medicine Bow	80V			Medicine Bow Airport		
Shoshoni	49U			Shoshoni Municipal Airport		
Upton	83V			Upton Municipal Airport		
				**Other military airports**		
Cheyenne	FEW	FEW	KFEW	F. E. Warren Air Force Base		
				**Notable private-use airports**		
Encampment	WY11			A-A Ranch Airport		9
				**Notable former airports**		
Bar Nunn				Wardwell Field (closed 1952)		
Douglas	~~DGW~~			Douglas Municipal Airport (closed 1980s)		

== See also ==
- Essential Air Service
- Wyoming World War II Army Airfields
- Wikipedia:WikiProject Aviation/Airline destination lists: North America#Wyoming
