= Wyoming Airlines =

IATA	ICAO	Call sign
WJ	WYG	WYOMING
- Commenced operations: 1978
- Ceased operations: 1979
- Hubs: Cheyenne Regional Airport
- Destinations: 5
- Headquarters: Cheyenne, Wyoming, United States

Wyoming Airlines, or Wyoming Airlines Limited was an airline based in Cheyenne, Wyoming, United States. The airline only operated for 1 year, from 1978 to 1979.

== Destinations ==
According to the timetable image, these are the destinations Wyoming airlines serviced:

Country	State	City	Airport	Airport Codes			Notes	Refs
Country	State	City	Airport	IATA	ICAO	FAA LID	Notes	Refs
United States of America	Colorado	Denver	Stapleton International Airport	DEN	KDEN	DEN	Became Denver International Airport in 1995	
United States of America	Wyoming	Casper	Casper/Natrona County International Airport	CPR	KCPR	CPR	Changed name December 19, 2007	
United States of America	Wyoming	Cheyenne	Cheyenne Regional Airport	CYS	KCYS	CYS	Hub	
United States of America	Wyoming	Gillette	Gillette-Campbell County Airport	GCC	KGCC	GCC		
United States of America	Wyoming	Sheridan	Sheridan County Airport	SHR	KSHR	SHR		
