= Johnson County Airport (Wyoming) =

- IATA: BYG; ICAO: KBYG; FAA LID: BYG

Summary
- Airport type: Public
- Owner/Operator: Johnson County
- Serves: Buffalo, Wyoming
- Elevation AMSL: 4,970 ft (1,510 m)
- Coordinates: 44°22′51″N 106°43′18″W

Map
- Location of airport in Wyoming BYG (the United States)

Runways
Direction	Length		Surface
Direction	ft	m	Surface
13/31	6,143	1,872	Asphalt

Statistics
- Aircraft operations (2017): 5,295
- Based aircraft (2018): 30
- Source: Federal Aviation Administration

Johnson County Airport, (IATA: BYG, ICAO: KBYG, FAA LID: BYG) is a county-owned public-use airport located 3 miles (4.8 km) northeast of the central business district of Buffalo, Wyoming, a city in Johnson County, Wyoming, United States. It is included in the Federal Aviation Administration (FAA) National Plan of Integrated Airport Systems for 2017–2021, in which it is categorized as a local general aviation facility.

== Facilities and aircraft ==
Johnson County Airport covers an area of 240 acres (97 ha) at an elevation of 4,970 feet (1,515 m) above mean sea level. It has one runway: 13/31 is 6,143 by 75 feet (1,872 x 23 m) with an asphalt surface.

For the 12-month period ending June 30, 2017, the airport had 5,295 aircraft operations, an average of 14 per day: 99% general aviation, 2% air taxi, and <1% military. In August 2018, there was 30 aircraft based at this airport: 26 single-engine, 2 multi-engine, 1 jet, and 1 helicopter.

== Historical airline service ==
According to the April 15, 1975 edition of the Official Airline Guide (OAG), Trans Mountain Airlines, a small Denver-based commuter air carrier which was also known as Trans Mountain Air, was operating scheduled passenger flights every weekday on a round trip routing of Cheyenne (CYS) - Casper (CPR) - Buffalo (BYG) - Sheridan (SHR) with small twin engine prop aircraft.

== Accidents and incidents ==
- July 31, 1979: Western Airlines Flight 44 with 94 passengers on board mistakenly landed here instead of its intended destination of Sheridan County Airport in Sheridan, Wyoming. The Boeing 737-200 jetliner caused minor damage to the runway due to its weight; however, there were no injuries reported.

== See also ==
- List of airports in Wyoming
