= Lists of airports in Oceania =

This page contains the lists of airports in Oceania by country, grouped by region. The lists include both military air bases and civilian airports.

== Australia and New Zealand ==
- List of airports in Australia
- List of airports in Christmas Island
- List of airports in the Cocos (Keeling) Islands
- List of airports in New Zealand
- List of airports in Norfolk Island

== Melanesia ==
- List of airports in Fiji
- List of airports in New Caledonia
- List of airports in Papua New Guinea
- List of airports in Solomon Islands
- List of airports in Vanuatu

== Micronesia ==
- List of airports in Guam
- List of airports in Kiribati
- List of airports in the Marshall Islands
- List of airports in the Federated States of Micronesia
- List of airports in Nauru
- List of airports in the Northern Mariana Islands
- List of airports in Palau
- List of airports in United States minor islands

== Polynesia ==
- List of airports in American Samoa
- List of airports in Cook Islands
- List of airports in French Polynesia
- List of airports in Niue
- List of airports in Samoa
- List of airports in Tonga
- List of airports in Tuvalu
- List of airports in Wallis and Futuna

== See also ==
- Lists of airports
- List of the busiest airports in Oceania
- Wikipedia:WikiProject Aviation/Airline destination lists: Oceania
