= KDGW =

KDGW may refer to:

- Converse County Airport (ICAO code KDGW)
- KDGW-LP, a low-power radio station (96.5 FM) licensed to serve Grants Pass, Oregon, United States
