= KSAA =

KSAA may refer to:

- KSAA-LD, a low-power television station (channel 10, virtual 28) licensed to serve San Antonio, Texas, United States
- Shively Field (ICAO code KSAA)
