= WYG =

WYG may refer to:

- Wuyuan railway station, Jiangxi, China; by China Railway telegraph code
- Wyoming Airlines, defunct US-based airline; by ICAO code
- Wyong railway station, New South Wales, Australia; by Sydney Trains station code
