= Dubois Municipal Airport (Wyoming) =

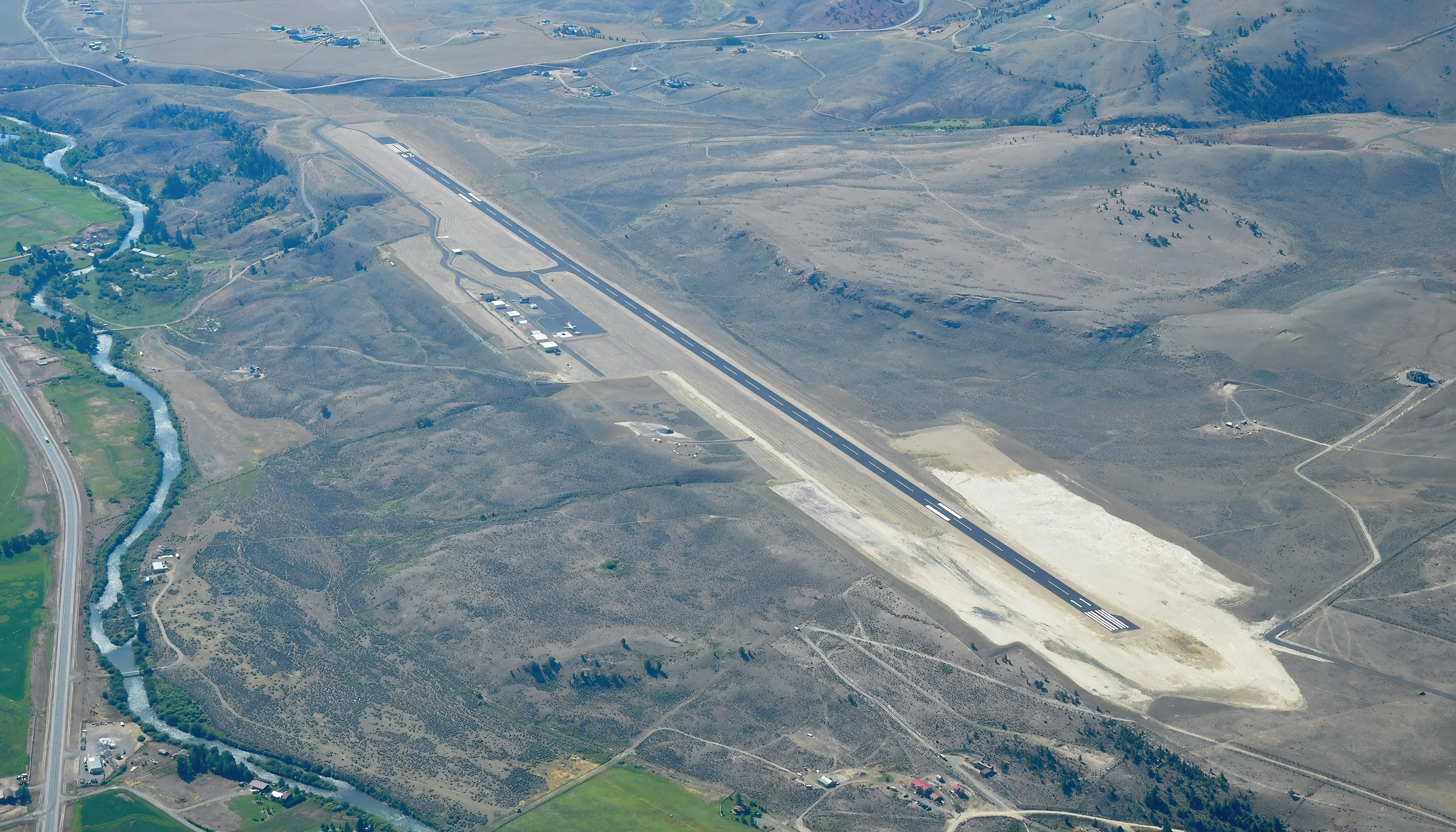
- IATA: none; ICAO: KDUB; FAA LID: DUB

Summary
- Airport type: Public
- Owner: Town of Dubois
- Serves: Dubois, Wyoming
- Elevation AMSL: 7,297 ft (2,224 m)
- Coordinates: 43°32′54″N 109°41′24″W
- Interactive map of Dubois Municipal Airport

Runways
Direction	Length		Surface
Direction	ft	m	Surface
11/29	6,700	2,042	Asphalt

Statistics (2010)
- Aircraft operations: 1,750
- Based aircraft: 14
- Source: Federal Aviation Administration

Dubois Municipal Airport (ICAO: KDUB, FAA LID: DUB, formerly U25) is a town-owned public-use airport located three nautical miles (6 km) northwest of the central business district of Dubois, a town in Fremont County, Wyoming, United States. It is included in the National Plan of Integrated Airport Systems for 2011–2015, which categorized it as a general aviation airport.

Although most U.S. airports use the same three-letter location identifier for the FAA and IATA, this airport is assigned DUB by the FAA, but has no designation from the IATA (which assigned DUB to Dublin Airport in Dublin, Ireland).

== Facilities and aircraft ==
Dubois Municipal Airport covers an area of 211 acres (85 ha) at an elevation of 7,297 feet (2,224 m) above mean sea level. It has one runway designated 11/29 with an asphalt surface measuring 6,700 by 75 feet (2,042 x 23 m).

For the 12-month period ending May 31, 2020, the airport had 1,490 aircraft operations, an average of 124 per month: 97% general aviation and 3% air taxi. At that time there were 14 single engine aircraft based at this airport, plus 2 gliders.

== See also ==
- List of airports in Wyoming
