= Johnson County Airport =

Johnson County Airport may refer to:

- Johnson County Airport (Tennessee) in Mountain City, Tennessee, United States (FAA: 6A4)
- Johnson County Airport (Wyoming) in Buffalo, Wyoming, United States (FAA: BYG)
- Johnson County Executive Airport in Olathe, Kansas, United States (FAA: OJC)
