= KPOY =

KPOY may refer to:

- KPOY (FM), a defunct radio station (90.3 FM) formerly licensed to serve Fraser, Colorado, United States
- KQNG-FM, a radio station (93.5 FM) licensed to serve Lihue, Hawaii, United States, which held the call sign KPOY from January 1980 to October 1982
- The kenpom Player of the Year award, introduced in 2010 by Ken Pomeroy's kenpom.com honoring the top player in NCAA Division I men's college basketball
- Powell Municipal Airport in Powell, Wyoming (ICAO code KPOY)
