= Afton Municipal Airport =

Airport in Wyoming, United States

Afton Municipal Airport Afton-Lincoln County Airport
- IATA: AFO; ICAO: KAFO; FAA LID: AFO

Summary
- Airport type: Public
- Owner: Town of Afton
- Serves: Afton, Wyoming
- Elevation AMSL: 6,221 ft (1,896 m)
- Coordinates: 42°42′32″N 110°56′32″W
- Interactive map of Afton Municipal Airport

Runways
Direction	Length		Surface
Direction	ft	m	Surface
16/34	7,025	2,141	Asphalt

Statistics (2022)
- Aircraft operations (year ending 6/30/2022): 9,200
- Based aircraft: 45
- Source: Federal Aviation Administration

Afton Municipal Airport (IATA: AFO, ICAO: KAFO, FAA LID: AFO) is a town-owned, public-use airport located one nautical mile (1.85 km) southwest of the central business district of Afton, a town in Lincoln County, Wyoming, United States. It is also known as Afton-Lincoln County Airport.

This airport is included in the FAA's National Plan of Integrated Airport Systems (2009–2013), which categorizes it as a general aviation airport.

== Facilities and aircraft ==
The airport covers an area of 328 acres (133 ha) at an elevation of 6,221 feet (1,896 m) above mean sea level. It has one runway designated 16/34 with an asphalt surface measuring 7,025 by 75 feet (2,141 x 23 m).

For the 12-month period ending June 30, 2022, the airport had 9,200 aircraft operations, an average of 25 per day: 94% general aviation and 5% air taxi. At that time there were 45 aircraft based at this airport: 37 single-engine, 3 multi-engine, and 5 jet.

== See also ==
- List of airports in Wyoming
