= PWY =

PWY may refer to:

- Patchway railway station (National Rail station code: PWY), a railway station in South Gloucestershire, England
- Ralph Wenz Field (IATA: PWY), a town-owned public-use airport located in Sublette County, Wyoming, United States
