= Medicine Bow Airport =

- Site 32 SL-O Intermediate Field Historic District
- U.S. National Register of Historic Places
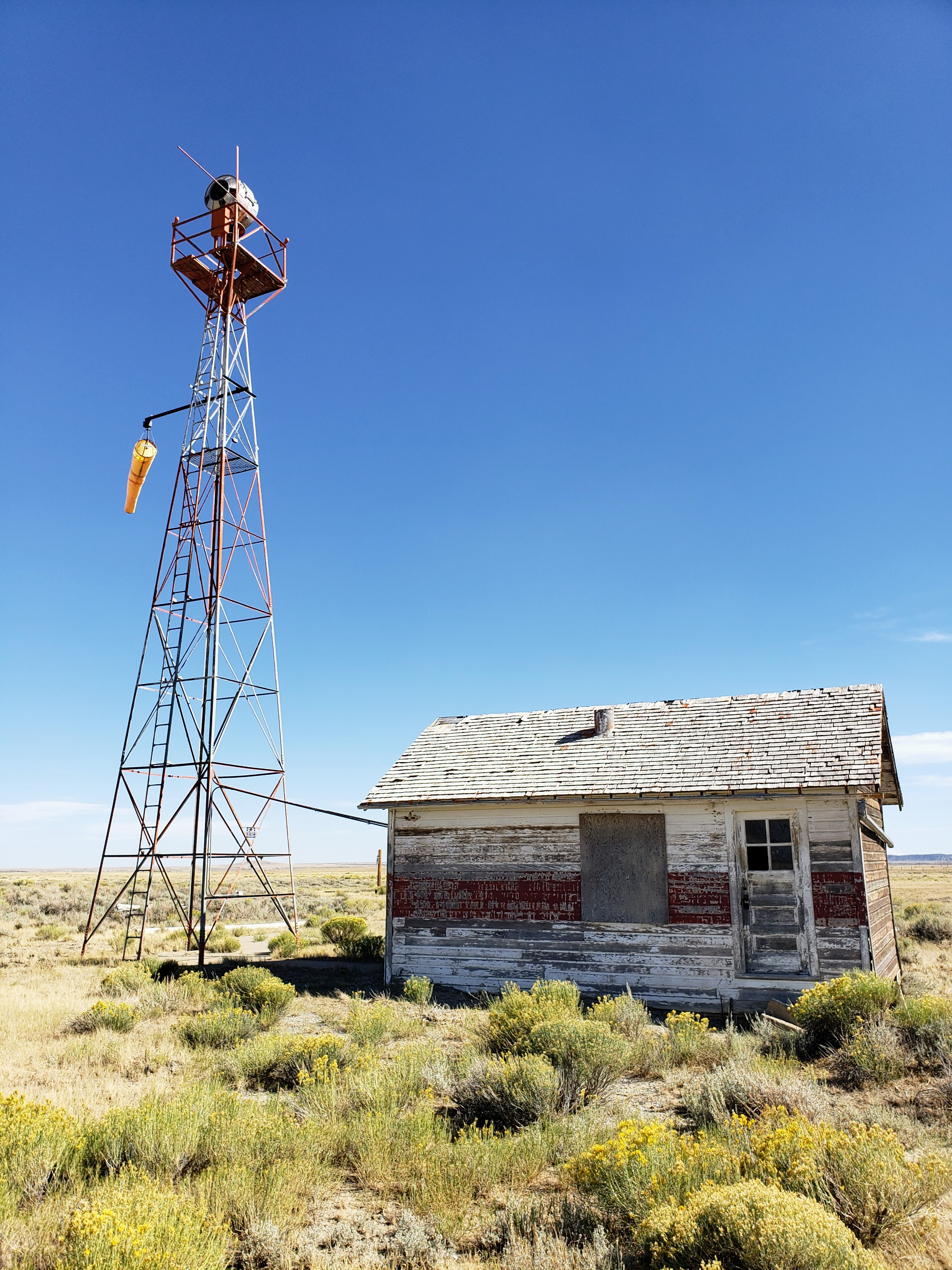

- Location within Wyoming
- Location: Medicine Bow, Wyoming
- Coordinates: 41.8865°N 106.1884°W
- Built: 1929
- NRHP reference No.: 12000054
- Added to NRHP: February 28, 2012

Site 32 SL-O (Salt Lake-Omaha) Intermediate Field Historic District, also known as the Medicine Bow Airport (FAA LID: 80V), is an early lighted airway on the Transcontinental Airway System, located just south of the town of Medicine Bow, Wyoming. The airport was built one mile west, then moved to this location in 1929, as an emergency landing field on Route T, the New York to San Francisco airway, between larger airfields at Salt Lake and Omaha. It included a constantly-lit beacon and a cement arrow which pointed the way to the next beacon along the airway route.

== See also ==
- List of airports in Wyoming
