= Ferguson v. NTSB =

- Court: United States Court of Appeals for the Ninth Circuit
- Full case name: Lowell G. Ferguson v. National Transportation Safety Board
- Decided: June 2, 1982
- Citation: 678 F. 2d 821 (9th Cir. 1982)

Court membership
- Judges sitting: Eugene Allen Wright, Arthur Alarcón, Stephen Reinhardt

Case opinions
- Majority: Alarcón, joined by Wright, Reinhardt

Western Airlines Flight 44
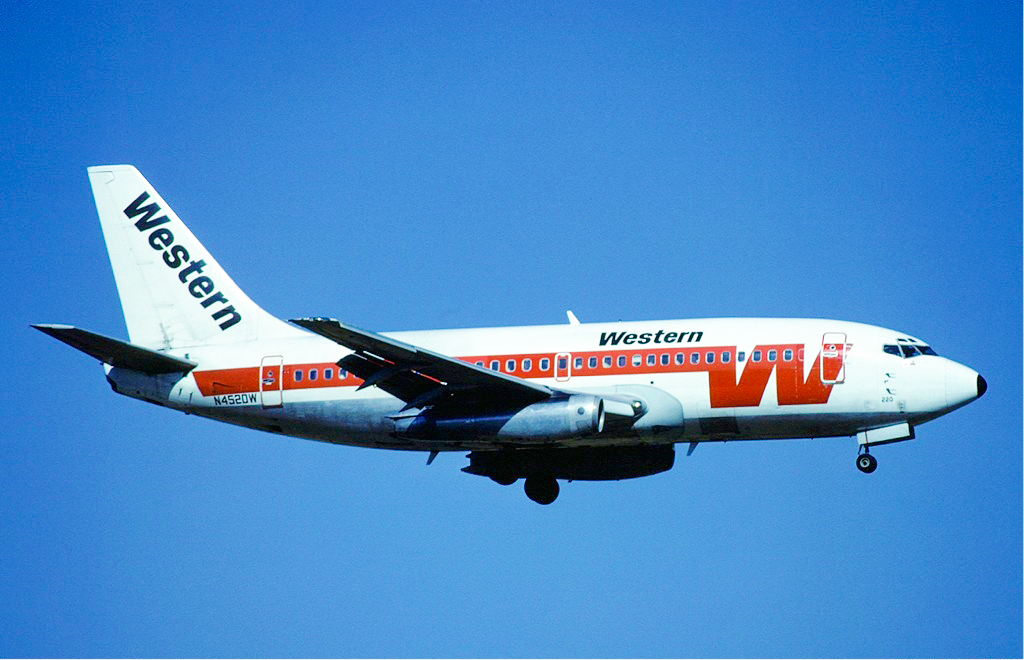
- A Boeing 737-200 similar to the incident aircraft

Incident
- Date: July 31, 1979
- Summary: Landing at an airport without ATC clearance, failure to identify correct landing airport, damage to runway upon landing
- Site: Johnson County Airport, Buffalo, Wyoming; 44.3811303°N 106.7221664°W

Aircraft
- Aircraft type: Boeing 737-200
- Operator: Western Airlines
- Flight origin: Los Angeles International Airport, Los Angeles, California

Ferguson v. NTSB, 678 F. 2d 821 (9th Cir. 1982) is a landmark aviation ruling by the United States Court of Appeals for the Ninth Circuit handed down on June 2, 1982.

On July 31, 1979, Lowell G. Ferguson was the captain of a Western Airlines Boeing 737-200 jetliner operating as Flight 44 from Los Angeles, California, to seven destinations, including Las Vegas, Nevada; Denver, Colorado; and Sheridan, Wyoming. Ferguson, with over 12,000 hours of flying experience, had never been found in violation of any Federal Aviation Regulations (FARs).

The first officer flew the aircraft, while Ferguson handled radio communications. However, by regulation, Ferguson was the pilot in command as captain of the aircraft. Neither crew member had ever landed at Sheridan, but each thought that the other had done so in the past. At approximately 10:00 p.m. MDT, the crew mistakenly landed the aircraft at Buffalo, Wyoming, thinking it was their destination airport of Sheridan. While there was no emergency and no one suffered injuries, the airport tarmac sustained damage as it was not constructed to hold the weight of a commercial airliner.

On November 28, 1979, the Federal Aviation Administration (FAA) suspended Ferguson's Airline Transport Pilot certificate for 60 days, and charged Ferguson with violation of four sections of the Federal Aviation Regulations: (1) § 91.75(a) (14 C.F.R. § 91.75, deviating from an air traffic control clearance; (2) § 121.590(a) (14 C.F.R. § 121.590), landing at an airport not certificated under part 139 of the Federal Aviation Regulations; (3) § 121.555(b) (14 C.F.R. § 121.555), landing at an airport not listed in the Western Airlines Operations Specifications; and (4) § 91.9 (14 C.F.R. § 91.9), operating an aircraft in a careless or reckless manner so as to endanger the life or property of another. The National Transportation Safety Board (NTSB) adopted the FAA's suspension as its response to the incident.

Ferguson appealed the suspension and claimed he was entitled to a waiver of punishment under the "inadvertent and not deliberate" provision of a joint FAA-National Aeronautics and Space Administration (NASA) aviation safety program called the Aviation Safety Reporting Program.

While the NTSB agreed that Ferguson's actions were not deliberate, his appeal was rejected when the court decided his actions were reckless and in violation of a key FAR (§ 91.5) that required a pilot to familiarize himself or herself with all available flight information, and a company policy (Western Airlines Flight Operation Manual, P 5.3.3.C) that required him to use a radio navigational instrument to identify the airport before landing. Ferguson claimed he "saw the runway and assumed it was the right airport".

The ruling coined the phrase "inadvertent and not deliberate actions cannot encompass reckless conduct". In essence, Ferguson was suspended even though he made an "honest mistake", because as a professional pilot, he was expected to do whatever he could to avoid that mistake. That, by his own admission, he failed to do.
