= Raymond A. Johnson =

American aviator

- Born: 1912; Laramie, Wyoming, USA
- Died: 1984 (aged 71–72)
- Occupation: Aviator: Inductee of the Wyoming Aviation Hall of Fame

Raymond A. Johnson (1912–1984) a native of Laramie, Wyoming, was one of his state's pioneer aircraft pilots. Besides commercial flights, his career included the tasks of weather observation, crop dusting, air racing, and lookouts for forest fires. In 2013, he became posthumously the 22nd inductee into the Wyoming Aviation Hall of Fame in Cheyenne.

During World War II, Johnson was a test pilot on the North American P-51 Mustang and North American B-25 Mitchell for North American Aviation in Kansas City, Missouri. Afterwards, he worked at airports in Mitchell, Nebraska; Huron, South Dakota, and Great Falls, Montana. Johnson also flew for such companies as Rocky Mountain Airways and Plains Airways. He was operations manager of the United States Army Air Corps training program at Cheyenne, Laramie, and Fort Morgan in northeastern Colorado.

Johnson was certified by the former Civil Aeronautics Authority to conduct flight training at the University of Wyoming in Laramie and at Lambert Field in St. Louis, Missouri. In 1951, Johnson became flight instructor and later flight commander at Columbus Air Force Base in Columbus, Mississippi, where he was responsible for training pilots during the Korean War. He was one of the first flight instructors at the time of the formation in 1947 of the United States Air Force. Pilots entering the Korean War were trained at a time when planes were switched from piston engines to jet aircraft.

In 1960, Johnson returned to Cheyenne to become the safety and enforcement officer of the Wyoming Aeronautics Commission, the same body that more than a half-century later approved his nomination to the Hall of Fame. He was also the pilot for Governors Jack R. Gage and Clifford Hansen.

The Wyoming Aviation Hall of Fame was established in 1994. Only one aviator can be inducted into the Hall of Fame each year. John Waggener, president of the Hall of Fame, said that the limit of one inductee per year is designed to make the award more meaningful. Johnson's name was originally submitted by a former coworker shortly after the Hall of Fame opened. His folder was rediscovered nearly twenty years later.

Waggener said that Johnson, who died in 1984, saw the development of aviation from a mere novelty into a global industry. He describes Johnson's legacy, accordingly:

Ray lived in the golden age of aviation. He not only witnessed it, he was part of it. But he'll probably be one of the last of this World War II era. We're starting to see a whole new range of pilots that include Vietnam pilots, big commercial pilots during the jet age, so we're going to see some different types of nominations [for the Hall of Fame] here in the next few years.

Plaques honoring the Wyoming aviators are displayed at the terminal of the Cheyenne Regional Airport.
