= Converse County Airport =

Airport in Wyoming, United States

- IATA: DGW; ICAO: KDGW; FAA LID: DGW

Summary
- Airport type: Public
- Owner: Converse County
- Serves: Douglas, Wyoming
- Elevation AMSL: 4,933 ft (1,504 m)
- Coordinates: 42°47′50″N 105°23′09″W
- Interactive map of Converse County Airport

Runways
Direction	Length		Surface
Direction	ft	m	Surface
11/29	6,534	1,992	Asphalt
5/23	4,760	1,451	Asphalt

Helipads
Number	Length		Surface
Number	ft	m	Surface
H1	60	18	Asphalt
H2	60	18	Asphalt

Statistics (2008)
- Aircraft operations: 5,475
- Based aircraft: 40
- Source: Federal Aviation Administration

Converse County Airport (IATA: DGW, ICAO: KDGW, FAA LID: DGW) is three miles north of Douglas, Wyoming, in Converse County, which owns it.

== Facilities ==
The airport covers 494 acres (200 ha) at an elevation of 4,933 feet (1,504 m). It has two asphalt runways: 11/29 is 6,534 by 100 feet (1,992 x 30 m) and 5/23 is 4,760 by 75 feet (1,451 x 23 m). Two helipads, H1 and H2, are each 60 by 60 feet (18 x 18 m).

In the year ending May 31, 2020 the airport had 4,854 aircraft operations, average 13 per day: 97% general aviation, 2% air taxi and <1% military. 30 aircraft were then based at the airport: 28 single-engine and 2 multi-engine.

== See also ==
- List of airports in Wyoming
