= Bar Nunn, Wyoming =

- Town
- Location of Bar Nunn in Natrona County, Wyoming
- Coordinates: 42°55′19″N 106°20′51″W
- Country: United States
- State: Wyoming
- County: Natrona

Area
  - Total: 2.10 sq mi (5.44 km^{2})
  - Land: 2.10 sq mi (5.44 km^{2})
  - Water: 0 sq mi (0.00 km^{2})
- Elevation: 5,285 ft (1,611 m)

Population (2020)
  - Total: 2,981
  - Density: 1,339.7/sq mi (517.26/km^{2})
- Time zone: UTC-7 (Mountain (MST))
  - Summer (DST): UTC-6 (MDT)
- ZIP codes: 82601, 82609
- Area code: 307
- FIPS code: 56-05245
- GNIS feature ID: 2411663
- Website: barnunnwy.gov

Bar Nunn is a town in Natrona County, Wyoming, United States. It is a part of the Casper, Wyoming Metropolitan Statistical Area. The population was 2,981 at the 2020 census, a jump of 35% from a population of 2,213 at the 2010 census. It was incorporated in 1980.

The town was constructed around the runways of Wardwell Field, Casper's original airport, which was later replaced by Casper–Natrona County International Airport.

== History ==
Bar Nunn was founded in the 1970s by Romie Nunn (1903–1988), and named for him.

The town of Bar Nunn was originally the site of Wardwell Field, which served as Natrona County's regional airport until 1952. That year, the newly formed United States Air Force abandoned the Casper Army Airfield located a few miles to the west. Local government assumed control of that airport and relocated regional aircraft operations creating the Casper-Natrona County International Airport.

Romie Nunn, a local rancher and successful businessman, had moved to Casper in 1918 with his family. Mr. Nunn would registered the Bar Nunn brand (-N) with the Wyoming State Livestock Board. His family still owned a portion of the Wardwell Field property. Mr. Nunn repurchased the remaining airport property (consisting of 640 acres) in 1954 for $20,500. Mr. Nunn hoped to make the location "The horse center of the Rockies”. Mr. Nunn ultimately subdivided the area in 1958, naming it the Bar Nunn Ranch Subdivision.

In the late 70's the homeowners association of Bar Nunn Ranch Subdivision experienced deficiencies in services related to snow removal and street repairs. The members voted to incorporate as a municipality thus Bar Nunn became a town in 1982. The formation of the town improved service availability and provided for funding avenues. Although no longer a functional airport, the former runways now function as a framework for the town's street pattern. The circular logo of the municipality features the original runways layout of Wardwell Field.

== Geography ==
According to the United States Census Bureau, the town has a total area of 2.10 square miles (5.44 km^{2}), all land.

== Demographics ==
Historical population
Census	Pop.	Note	%±
1990	835		—
2000	936		12.1%
2010	2,213		136.4%
2020	2,981		34.7%

=== 2010 census ===
At the 2010 census there were 2,213 people, 748 households, and 605 families in the town. The population density was 1,053.8 inhabitants per square mile (406.9/km^{2}). There were 761 housing units at an average density of 362.4 units per square mile (139.9 units/km^{2}). The racial makup of the town was 93.4% White, 0.8% African American, 0.8% Native American, 0.1% Asian, 2.6% from other races, and 2.3% from two or more races. Hispanic or Latino of any race were 7.2%.

Of the 748 households 49.1% had children under the age of 18 living with them, 65.1% were married couples living together, 9.0% had a female householder with no husband present, 6.8% had a male householder with no wife present, and 19.1% were non-families. 12.8% of households were one person and 2.6% were one person aged 65 or older. The average household size was 2.96 and the average family size was 3.23.

The median age in the town was 30.5 years. 32.6% of residents were under the age of 18; 7.4% were between the ages of 18 and 24; 32.1% were from 25 to 44; 21.8% were from 45 to 64; and 6% were 65 or older. The gender makeup of the town was 49.7% male and 50.3% female.

=== 2000 census ===
At the 2000 census there were 936 people, 315 households, and 252 families in the town. The population density was 458.6 people per square mile (177.1 people/km^{2}). There were 339 housing units at an average density of 166.1 units per square mile (64.1 units/km^{2}). The racial makup of the town was 93.80% White, 0.53% African American, 1.18% Native American, 0.11% Asian, 0.53% Pacific Islander, 2.03% from other races, and 1.82% from two or more races. Hispanic or Latino of any race were 4.81%.

Of the 315 households 46.0% had children under the age of 18 living with them, 66.7% were married couples living together, 7.9% had a female householder with no husband present, and 20.0% were non-families. 13.3% of households were one person and 1.3% were one person aged 65 or older. The average household size was 2.97 and the average family size was 3.26.

The age distribution was 33.0% under the age of 18, 9.5% from 18 to 24, 31.8% from 25 to 44, 21.7% from 45 to 64, and 4.0% 65 or older. The median age was 32 years. For every 100 females, there were 103.9 males. For every 100 females age 18 and over, there were 103.6 males.

The median household income was $40,313 and the median family income was $42,000. Males had a median income of $32,431 versus $18,636 for females. The per capita income for the town was $15,045. About 8.0% of families and 12.3% of the population were below the poverty line, including 16.2% of those under age 18 and 12.5% of those age 65 or over.

== Government ==
Bar Nunn has a mayor and town council. There are four council members. Mayor Peter Boyer's term is through December 2026.

== Education ==
Public education in the town of Bar Nunn is provided by Natrona County School District #1.

== Recent trends ==
In 2006, Bar Nunn led the state of Wyoming in population growth. Between 2005 and 2006, the community saw an estimated 18.6 percent increase in population –- up to 1,527 in 2006. That was a 63% increase over the census count in 2000. The large growth in Bar Nunn and Natrona County has been attributed to a boom in Wyoming's energy sector.

Bar Nunn reported a 2025 population of 2,997. The town population is declining at a rate of -0.07% annually and its population has decreased by -0.3% since the most recent census, which recorded a population of 3,006 in 2020.

== See also ==
- List of municipalities in Wyoming
