= Ralph Wenz Field =

- IATA: PWY; ICAO: KPNA; FAA LID: PNA

Summary
- Airport type: Public
- Owner: Town of Pinedale
- Serves: Pinedale, Wyoming
- Elevation AMSL: 7,096 ft / 2,163 m
- Coordinates: 42°47′44″N 109°48′26″W
- Interactive map of Ralph Wenz Field

Runways
Direction	Length		Surface
Direction	ft	m	Surface
11/29	8,900	2,713	Asphalt

Statistics (2022)
- Aircraft operations (year ending 6/30/2022): 3,946
- Source: Federal Aviation Administration

Ralph Wenz Field (IATA: PWY, ICAO: KPNA, FAA LID: PNA) is a town-owned public-use airport located five nautical miles (9 km) southeast of the central business district of the town of Pinedale in Sublette County, Wyoming, United States.

Although most U.S. airports use the same three-letter location identifier for the FAA and IATA, this airport is assigned PNA by the FAA but has no designation from the IATA (which assigned PNA to Pamplona Airport in Pamplona, Spain).

Ralph Wenz Field is named after Staff Sgt. Ralph Wenz of the United States Army Air Corps. Originally from Nebraska, Wenz moved to Wyoming before the war where he learned to fly airplanes, worked as an air mail pilot, and built airfields. He joined the military and became a radio operator with the Engineers Air Corps Division. He died in 1943 when his aircraft, a B-24, crashed in the Alaska wilderness in what would become the Yukon-Charley Rivers National Preserve. His remains were found by a recovery team in October 1944.

== Facilities and aircraft ==
Ralph Wenz Field covers an area of 485 acres (196 ha) at an elevation of 7,096 feet (2,163 m) above mean sea level. It has one asphalt paved runway designated 11/29 which measures 8,900 by 100 feet (2,713 x 30 m).

For the 12-month period ending June 30, 2022, the airport had 3,946 aircraft operations, an average of 76 per week: 67% general aviation, 33% air taxi, and <1% military.

== See also ==
- List of airports in Wyoming
