= Powell Municipal Airport =

- IATA: POY; ICAO: KPOY; FAA LID: POY

Summary
- Airport type: Public
- Owner: City of Powell
- Serves: Powell, Wyoming
- Elevation AMSL: 5,095.7 ft / 1,553.2 m
- Coordinates: 44°52′01.8000″N 108°47′36.3″W
- Website: https://cityofpowell.com/municipal-airport/
- Interactive map of Powell Municipal Airport

Runways
Direction	Length		Surface
Direction	ft	m	Surface
13/31	6,200	1,890	Asphalt
17/35	2,709	826	Dirt
3/21	2,623	799	Dirt
- Source: Federal Aviation Administration

Powell Municipal Airport (IATA: POY, ICAO: KPOY, FAA LID: POY) is a public-use airport located 7 mi (11 km) north of the town of Powell, Wyoming. The National Plan of Integrated Airport Systems for 2011–2015 categorized it as a general aviation facility.

== Facilities ==
The airport is located at an elevation of 5,095.7 ft (1,553.2 m). It has three runways: 13/31, which is 6200 x 100 ft. (1890 x 30 m), 17/35, which is 2709 x 100 ft. (826 x 30 m), and 3/21, which is 2623 x 100 ft. (799 x 30 m). The airport has no control tower.

Proposals have been made to attempt to attract commercial service to the airport, which would require significant upgrades to the airport's runways and facilities. In 2020, the airport was awarded roughly $620,000 for the construction of a new taxiway.
