= Wardwell Field =

- IATA: none; ICAO: none

Summary
- Airport type: Public
- Owner: Natrona County
- Serves: Casper, Wyoming
- Elevation AMSL: 5,282 ft / 1,610 m
- Coordinates: 42°54′48″N 106°20′49″W
- Interactive map of Wardwell Field

Wardwell Field was a public airport approximately six miles (9.7 km) north of Casper, Wyoming. Constructed in 1927, the airport was named two years later for Maj. Doyen Wardwell, a World War I aviator and advocate for aviation in the state of Wyoming who was killed in a crash near the airport in August 1929. Closed in 1952, the former airport site is now the location of the town of Bar Nunn.

== History ==
In the mid-1920s, Maj. Wardwell, then a member of Wyoming's board of aeronautics, led a group of local entrepreneurs to develop an airport to serve Natrona County, in the central part of the state. The airfield opened in 1927 at a cost of $125,000 (equivalent to $231,681 in 2025). The airport consisted of three un-numbered runways (later expanded with a fourth unpaved runway) and a large hangar, with the entire facility occupying 640 acres.

Scheduled air service began in 1931, operated by Wyoming Air Service (renamed Inland Air Lines from July 1938) on a multi-stop route connecting Denver and Billings.

In 1942, the United States Army Air Forces opened Casper Army Airfield as a training facility for B-17 and B-24 bomber crews. Located 5.5 miles (8.9 km) to the west, the base was inactivated in March 1945 and divested to the Army Corps of Engineers six months later. In 1949, the former base was offered to Natrona County, who considered it a superior option for future development of air service given its longer runways and more extensive infrastructure. Wardwell Field was formally closed in 1952 and all services transferred to the new Natrona County Municipal Airport.

== Redevelopment ==
In 1954, the former airport site was sold to local businessman Ronnie Nunn for the sum of $20,500 (equivalent to $245,771 in 2025), who sought to develop the site into an equestrian ranch. The site became a subdivision with the first houses built along the former runways and taxiways, while the hangar was converted to a rodeo arena. In 1968, an unoccupied former runway was used for filming aircraft scenes for the John Wayne film Hellfighters. The subdivision was ultimately incorporated as the town of Bar Nunn in 1982, with the streets retaining the airport's characteristic runway layout.

== See also ==
- List of defunct airports in the United States
