= List of airports in the Northern Mariana Islands =

This is a list of airports in the Northern Mariana Islands (a U.S. Commonwealth), grouped by type and sorted by location. It contains all public-use and military airports. Some private-use and former airports may be included where notable, such as airports that used to be public-use, those with commercial enplanements recorded by the Federal Aviation Administration (FAA) or airports assigned an International Air Transport Association (IATA) airport code.

== Airports ==
This list contains the following information:

- **Location** — The village or other location generally associated with the airport.
- **FAA** — The location identifier assigned by the Federal Aviation Administration (FAA).
- **IATA** — The airport code assigned by the International Air Transport Association (IATA). Those that do not match the FAA code are shown in bold.
- **ICAO** — The location indicator assigned by the International Civil Aviation Organization (ICAO).
- **Airport name** — The official airport name. Those shown in bold indicate the airport has scheduled service on commercial airlines.
- **Role** — One of four FAA airport categories, as per the 2021-2025 National Plan of Integrated Airport Systems (NPIAS) Report and updated based on FAA Passenger Boarding Data:
  - P: Commercial Service — Primary are publicly owned airports that receive scheduled passenger service and have more than 10,000 passenger boardings (enplanements) each year. Each primary airport is sub-classified by the FAA as one of the following four "hub" types:
    - L: Large Hub that accounts for at least 1% of total U.S. passenger enplanements.
    - M: Medium Hub that accounts for between 0.25% and 1% of total U.S. passenger enplanements.
    - S: Small Hub that accounts for between 0.05% and 0.25% of total U.S. passenger enplanements.
    - N: Non-Hub that accounts for less than 0.05% of total U.S. passenger enplanements, but more than 10,000 annual enplanements.
  - CS: Commercial Service — Non-Primary are publicly owned airports that receive scheduled passenger service and have at least 2,500 passenger boardings each year.
  - R: Reliever airports are designated by the FAA to relieve congestion at a large commercial service airport and to provide more general aviation access to the overall community.
  - GA: General Aviation airports are the largest single group of airports in the U.S. airport system.
- **Enpl**. — The number of enplanements (commercial passenger boardings) that occurred at the airport in calendar year 2024, as per FAA records.

City served	FAA	IATA	ICAO	Airport name	Role	Enplanements (2024)
**Commercial service — primary airports**
Obyan, Saipan Island	GSN	**SPN**	PGSN	**Saipan International Airport** (Francisco C. Ada)	P-N	234,042
Tinian Island	TNI	**TIQ**	PGWT	**Tinian International Airport** (West Tinian)	P-N	30,538
**Commercial service — non-primary airports**
Rota Island	GRO	**ROP**	PGRO	**Rota International Airport**	CS	10,717
**General aviation airports**
Shomushon, Pagan Island	TT01			Pagan Airstrip	GA	0
**Former military airfields**
Saipan Island				East Field (closed)		
Saipan Island				Kobler Field (closed)		
Saipan Island				Marpi Point Field (closed)		
Tinian Island				North Field (closed)		

== See also ==
- List of airports by ICAO code: P#PG - Mariana Islands
- Wikipedia:WikiProject Aviation/Airline destination lists: Oceania#Northern Mariana Islands (United States)
