= Wyoming World War II Army Airfields =

Wyoming World War II Army Airfields
- Part of World War II
- Map Of Wyoming World War II Army Airfields

Site information
- Type: Army Airfields

Site history
- Built: 1940-1944
- In use: 1940-present

During World War II, the United States Army Air Forces (USAAF) established numerous airfields in Wyoming for training pilots and aircrews of USAAF fighters and bombers.

Most of these airfields were under the command of Second Air Force or the Army Air Forces Training Command (AAFTC) (A predecessor of the current-day United States Air Force Air Education and Training Command). However the other USAAF support commands (Air Technical Service Command (ATSC); Air Transport Command (ATC) or Troop Carrier Command) commanded a significant number of airfields in a support roles.

It is still possible to find remnants of these wartime airfields. Many were converted into municipal airports, some were returned to agriculture and several were retained as United States Air Force installations and were front-line bases during the Cold War. Hundreds of the temporary buildings that were used survive today, and are being used for other purposes.

== Major Airfields ==
Second Air Force and Air Technical Service Command

- Casper Army Air Field, Casper, Wyoming

331st Bombardment Group (Heavy), 15 September 1942-1 April 1944
351st Base Headquarters and Air Base Squadron (Second AF), 15 September 1942-1 April 1944
211th Army Air Force Base Unit (Second AF), 1 April 1944-7 March 1945
4188th Army Air Force Base Unit (ATSC), 7 March 1945-1 October 1946
Now: Natrona County International Airport (IATA: CPR, ICAO: KCPR)

- Cheyenne Municipal Airport, Cheyenne, Wyoming

Joint Use USAAF/Civil Airport
Now: Cheyenne Regional Airport and Cheyenne Air National Guard Base (IATA: CYS, ICAO: KCYS)

- NOTE: During World War II, F. E. Warren Air Force Base was Fort Francis E. Warren, a United States Army facility. It became a United States Air Force base in 1947, however the only conventional airfield ever located at present-day F. E. Warren AFB during the war was a single dirt strip used for light fixed-wing aircraft. No aircraft were ever assigned to the facility during World War II. When reconstructed as a USAF strategic missile base in the 1950s, F. E. Warren AFB did not include a runway for jet aircraft, relying instead on nearby Cheyenne Air National Guard Base. F. E. Warren AFB does have a heliport and associated flight light for assigned USAF helicopters in support of missile site security and missile combat crew movements.
