= Shively Field =

- IATA: SAA; ICAO: KSAA; FAA LID: SAA

Summary
- Airport type: Public
- Owner: Town of Saratoga
- Operator: Saratoga Aviation
- Serves: Saratoga, Wyoming
- Elevation AMSL: 7,014 ft / 2,138 m
- Coordinates: 41°26′41″N 106°49′25″W
- Website: www.saratogajetcenter.com
- Interactive map of Shively Field

Runways
Direction	Length		Surface
Direction	ft	m	Surface
5/23	8,801	2,683	Asphalt

Statistics (2022)
- Aircraft operations (year ending 4/30/2022): 7,990
- Source: Federal Aviation Administration

Shively Field (IATA: SAA, ICAO: KSAA, FAA LID: SAA) is a public airport a mile southwest of Saratoga, in Carbon County, Wyoming.

== Facilities ==
Shively Field covers 720 acres (290 ha); its asphalt runway, 5/23, is 8,801 x 100 ft (2,683 x 30 m).

In the year ending April 30, 2022 the airport had 7,990 aircraft operations, average 22 per day: 88% general aviation and 12% air taxi.

== See also ==
- List of airports in Wyoming
