= Pioneer Airlines =

There were several companies named Pioneer Airlines.

- Essair was first authorized service in 1939 and did so but ceased operations due to legal problems. In 1944 the CAB gave approval and service was again started in 1945 serving cities in Texas. In 1946 the airline changed its name to Pioneer Air Lines. Merged with Continental Airlines in 1955.
- Pioneer Airlines operated out of Denver, Colorado, United States on January 12, 1977. It operated as Pioneer Airways to 1980 and then name changed to Pioneer Airlines. It was a Continental Airlines commuter until from 1979 to 1986 and went out of business on May 19, 1986.
- Pioneer Airlines of Springfield, Missouri started service in June, 1966 and served points in Missouri. The airline ceased operations in 1968.
- Pioneer Airlines of Washington, D.C. started operations in 1969 and ceased in 1970.
