= Gillette–Campbell County Airport =

Located in U.S. state of Wyoming

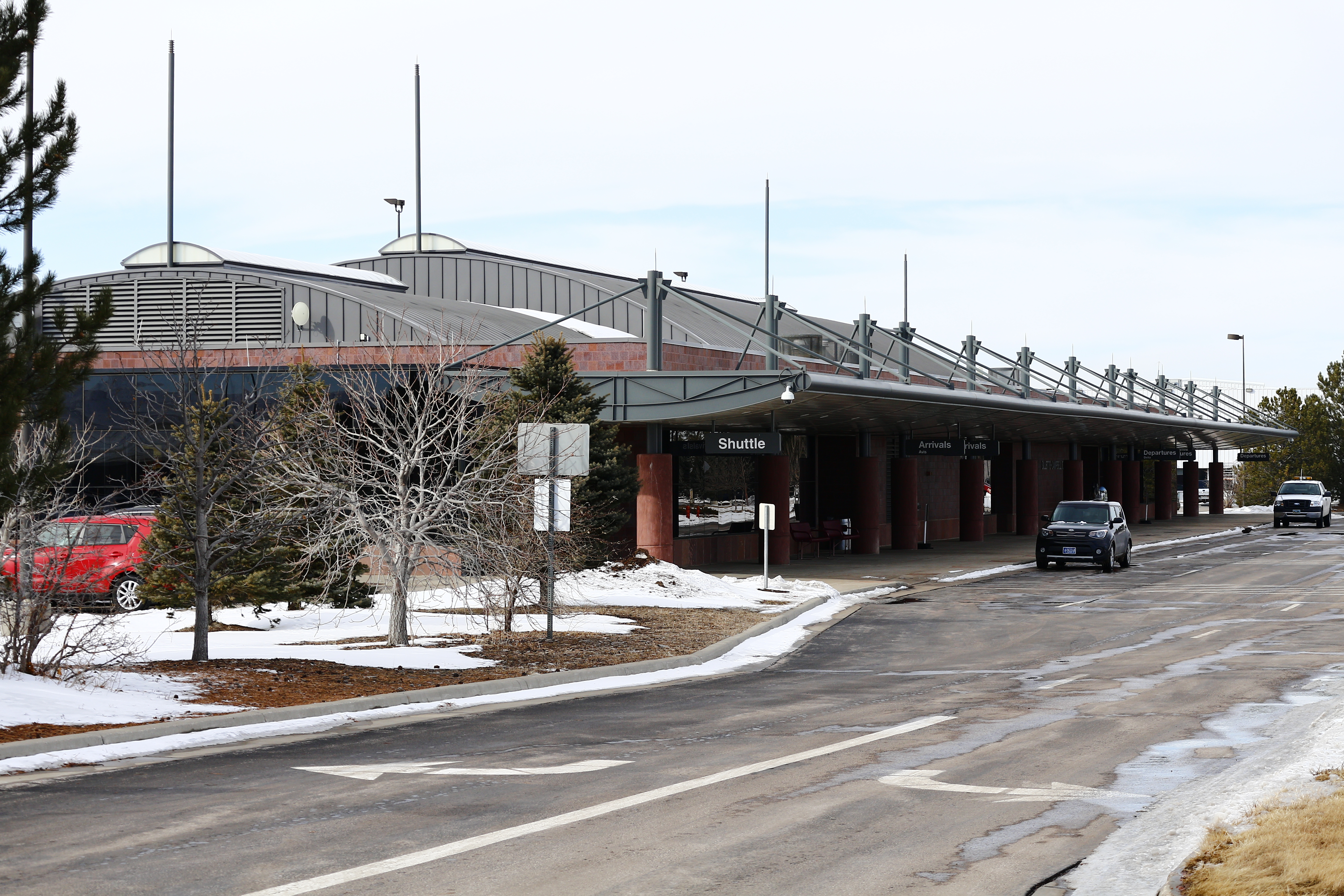
- Northeast Wyoming Regional Airport terminal
- IATA: GCC; ICAO: KGCC; FAA LID: GCC

Summary
- Airport type: Public
- Owner: Campbell County
- Serves: Gillette, Wyoming
- Elevation AMSL: 4,364 ft (1,330 m)
- Coordinates: 44°20′56″N 105°32′22″W
- Website: www.ccgov.net/319/Airport

Map
- Location of airport in Wyoming GCC (the United States)

Runways
Direction	Length		Surface
Direction	ft	m	Surface
16/34	7,500	2,286	Concrete
3/21	5,803	1,769	Concrete

Statistics (2018)
- Aircraft operations: 12,318
- Based aircraft: 58
- Source: Federal Aviation Administration

Gillette–Campbell County Airport (IATA: GCC, ICAO: KGCC, FAA LID: GCC), officially Northeast Wyoming Regional Airport, is a commercial airport five miles northwest of Gillette in Campbell County, Wyoming.

According to Bureau of Transportation Statistics records, the airport had 30,810 passenger boardings (enplanements) during the year ending May 2025 and 26,430 for the year ending May 2026.

== Facilities ==
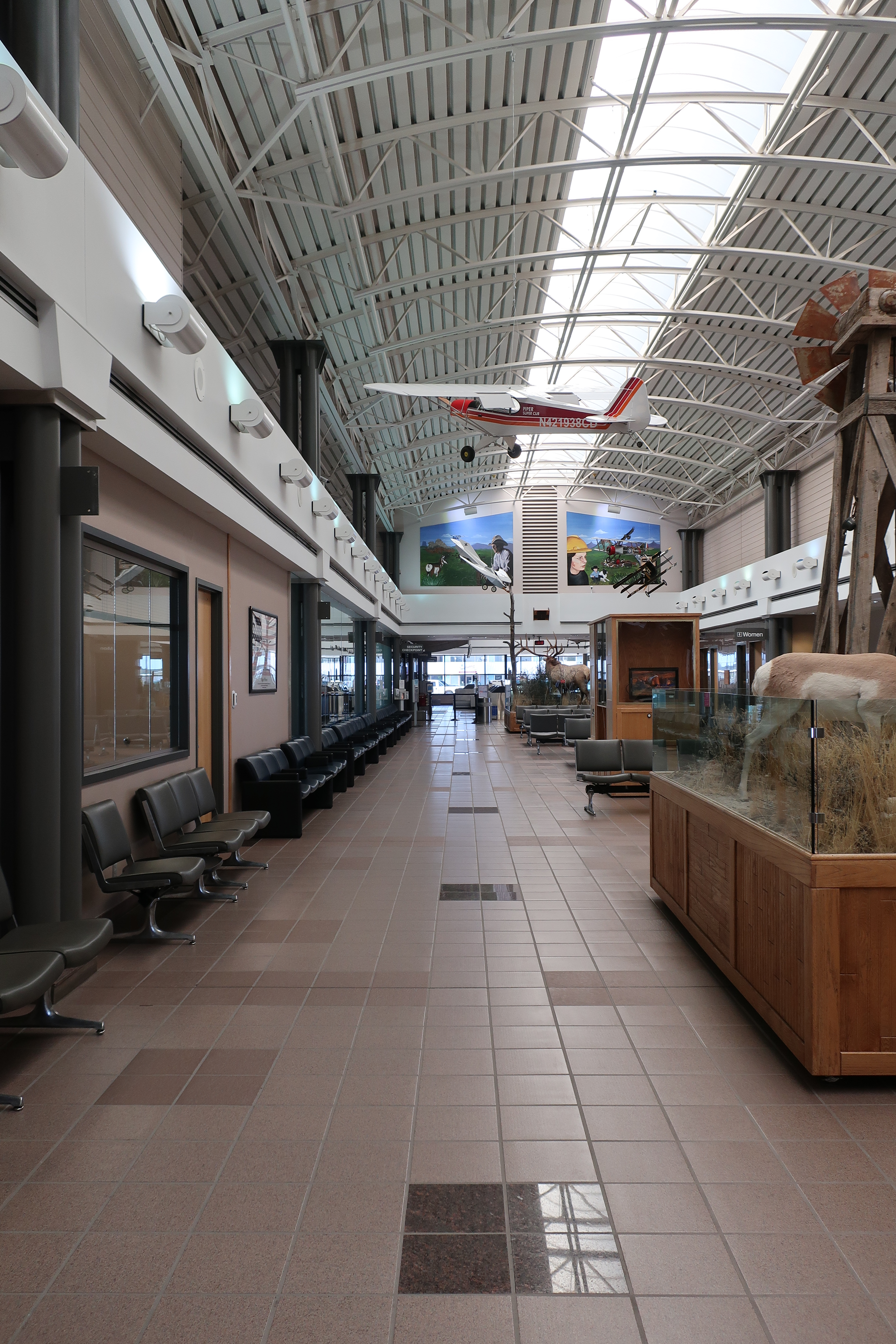
Inside the terminal

The airport covers 894 acres (362 ha) at an elevation of 4,364 feet (1,330 m). It has two concrete runways: 16/34 is 7,500 by 150 feet (2,286 x 46 m) and 3/21 is 5,803 by 75 feet (1,769 x 23 m).

An air traffic control tower was built in the early 1980s.

In 2018 the airport had 12,318 aircraft operations, average 34 per day: 77% general aviation, 23% air taxi, <1% military and <1% airline. 65 aircraft were then based at the airport: 89% single-engine, 9% multi-engine, and 1% jet.

As of June 30, 2020, air traffic control tower operations were suspended.

== Airline and destination ==
Airlines	Destinations
United Express	Denver

== Statistics ==
=== Top destinations ===
Busiest domestic routes from GCC (June 2025 - May 2026)
Rank	Airport	Passengers	Carrier
1	Denver, Colorado	26,430	United

=== Airline market share ===
Largest airlines at GCC (June 2025 – May 2026)
Rank	Airline	Passengers	Share
1	SkyWest operating as United Express	52,620	100%

== See also ==
- List of airports in Wyoming
