= Casper–Natrona County International Airport =

Airport in Wyoming, US

Casper–Natrona County International Airport Casper Army Airfield

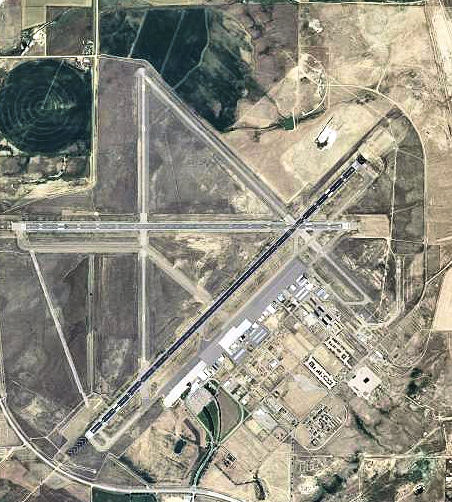
- 2006 USGS orthophoto
- IATA: CPR; ICAO: KCPR; FAA LID: CPR

Summary
- Airport type: Public
- Operator: Airport Board of Trustees
- Serves: Casper, Wyoming
- Location: Natrona County, near Casper, Wyoming
- Hub for: Corporate Air
- Elevation AMSL: 5,344 ft (1,629 m)
- Coordinates: 42°54′29″N 106°27′52″W
- Website: iflycasper.com

Maps
- FAA airport diagram
- Interactive map of Casper–Natrona County International Airport; Casper Army Airfield

Runways
Direction	Length		Surface
Direction	ft	m	Surface
03/21	10,165	3,098	Asphalt
08/26	8,679	2,645	Asphalt

Statistics (2022)
- Aircraft operations: 43,126
- Based aircraft: 131
- Sources: airport website and FAA

Casper–Natrona County International Airport (IATA: CPR, ICAO: KCPR, FAA LID: CPR) is 7 miles (11 km) northwest of Casper, in Natrona County, Wyoming. Before December 19, 2007, the airport was called Natrona County International Airport.

Scheduled passenger service was previously offered by SkyWest Airlines operating as Delta Connection on behalf of Delta Air Lines. Skywest Airlines, as well as CommutAir, operate as United Express on behalf of United Airlines as well. These regional airlines operate regional jet aircraft into Casper. Charter flights (known as "casino or gamblers' flights") are occasionally flown to Laughlin or Wendover, Nevada. Located near the airport is the NCIA Business Park, which houses a World War II museum and over 35 businesses ranging from manufacturing to aviation.

== History ==
Casper had airline flights in the 1930s at Wardwell Field, north of town at 42.913°N 106.35°W. The airport started as the Casper Army Airfield in September 1942, consisting of four asphalt hard surfaced runways – N/S, NE/SW, E/W, NW/SE – varying in length between 8,900 feet (2,700 m) and 8,600 feet (2,600 m).

Casper AAF was assigned to the Second Air Force as a heavy bomber (B-17; B-24) replacement training unit, with the 331st Bombardment Group being the training unit with four squadrons (461st, 462d, 463d and 464th Bombardment) training of personnel in heavy bomber operations. The 331st Combat Crew Training School provided ground instruction. Once personnel completed the training course, they were sent to various combat units overseas as replacement personnel.

The 331st was converted to a Very Heavy (B-29) group in July 1944 and began training for deployment to the Twentieth Air Force in the Pacific. The 211th Army Air Force Base Unit took control of the airfield. Casper AAF became part of the Air Transport Command as a transit station for WASP pilots ferrying combat aircraft across the United States. The airfield was inactivated in March 1945, and on 30 September 1945 was turned over to the Army Corps of Engineers as surplus.

The War Assets Administration turned the airfield over to civil control in the late 1940s, and in 1949 it became Natrona County Municipal Airport, replacing the former Casper Airport, Wardwell Field, whose runways are now streets in the town of Bar Nunn.

== Past airline service ==
Western Airlines was the first carrier to serve Casper tracing its roots back to 1931 as Wyoming Air Service with a north-south route from Denver to Great Falls, Montana, stopping in Cheyenne, Casper, Sheridan, Billings, and Lewiston. Wyoming Air Service changed to Inland Air Lines in 1938 and was merged into Western Airlines in 1952. A new east-west route was then added from Salt Lake City to Minneapolis stopping in Casper, then at Rapid City, Pierre, and Sioux Falls, South Dakota, and the north-south route was extended onto Lethbridge and Calgary, Alberta, Canada. Aircraft types operated by Wyoming Air Service and Western over the years included Boeing 247, Douglas DC-3, Convair 240 and Douglas DC-6B propliners, and Lockheed L-188 Electra turboprops. By 1970, the carrier began operating Boeing 737-200 jetliners on both routes, still making all the stops; however, the north-south route then terminated at Billings. The north-south route ended in 1979 and the eastern portion of the east-west route extending into Minneapolis ended by 1983, leaving only flights to Salt Lake City and Rapid City. Larger Boeing 727-200 jets were occasionally flown through Casper and in 1987 Western was merged into Delta Air Lines. Delta continued service into Casper with nonstop flights to its Salt Lake City (SLC) hub as well as Rapid City until 1994 when all operations were turned over to SkyWest Airlines operating as the Delta Connection using Embraer 120 turboprops. SkyWest previously served Casper with nonstops to Salt Lake City using Canadair CRJ-200 regional jets.

Challenger Airlines and successor Frontier Airlines served at Casper from the late 1940s until 1986. In 1950, Frontier was serving the airport with Douglas DC-3 aircraft, and by the early 1960s the airline had introduced larger Convair 340 and Convair 580 propliners. By 1970, Frontier began replacing their Convair 580 turboprop flights with Boeing 737-200 jet service primarily to its Denver (DEN) hub as well as to Billings, Bozeman, and Missoula, Montana and Jackson and Riverton, Wyoming. All Frontier service ended when the airline shut down on August 24, 1986.

Continental Airlines began flights in 1980 when this air carrier was operating a hub at Denver and was serving Casper with Boeing 727-200 and Douglas DC-9-10 jetliners. Continental ceased mainline flights in 1985 and turned their respective services over to regional airline partners which operated code sharing flights as Continental Express with various turboprop aircraft types. Continental Express service was operated by Pioneer Airlines (1985–1986) and Trans-Colorado Airlines (1986) with Fairchild Swearingen Metroliner aircraft. Continental reinstated mainline service on the Casper–Denver route for a short time in 1986–1987, then Continental Express service returned by Rocky Mountain Airways (1987–1991) and Britt Airways (1991–1994) with Beechcraft 1900C and ATR-42 aircraft. Final Continental representation was by GP Express (1994–1996) with Beechcraft 1900C aircraft. Continental then ended all hub operations at Denver and ceased all service to Casper. Prior to becoming a Continental Express air carrier in 1987, Rocky Mountain Airways served Casper from 1983 through 1985 as an independent airline with de Havilland Canada DHC-7 Dash 7 turboprops.

United Airlines began serving Casper in 1984 with nonstop Boeing 727-100, 727-200, and 737-200 jet flights to its Denver hub. In 1987, United mainline jets were replaced with United Express service flown by Aspen Airways (1987–1990) with Convair 580 turboprops and British Aerospace BAe 146-100 jet aircraft, then by Mesa Airlines (1990–1998) with Beechcraft 1900C, de Havilland Canada DHC-8 Dash 8 and Embraer EMB-120 Brasilia aircraft. Air Wisconsin then provided United Express service (1998–2002) with Dornier 328 propjets followed by Great Lakes Airlines (2001–2003) using Beechcraft 1900D aircraft. Great Lakes lost their designation as United Express in 2002 but continued to provide flights to Denver under its own branding. SkyWest Airlines then resumed United Express service in 2003 using Embraer 120 turboprops and later upgrading with Canadair CRJ-200 jets.

Northwest Airlink, the code-share affiliate carriers operating for Northwest Airlines, served Casper on two occasions. The first was in 1986 with flights to Billings operated by Big Sky Airlines using Fairchild Swearingen Metroliner aircraft and then from 2004 through 2009 by Mesaba Airlines with flights to Minneapolis using Canadair CRJ-200 regional jets. Big Sky had been previously serving Casper under their own brand from 1980 through 1986 and returned for a short time in 2003 with flights to Billings, again under their own brand.

Allegiant Airlines served Casper from 2009 through 2017 with two flights per week to Las Vegas using McDonnell Douglas MD-80 jets.

From the 1970s through the 1990s, several other smaller commuter and regional carriers served Casper for short periods of time including Air US with flights to Denver using the regional airliner version of Grumman Gulfstream I business propjet.

== Environmental investigation ==
As a formerly used defense site (FUDS) the Army has had to review sites according to the Comprehensive Environmental Response, Compensation and Liability Act since 1980. It was not until 2014, that funding became available. The Wyoming Department of Environmental Quality's main concern is chemical contamination in the area of a former landfill and sewage treatment plant. Together with the U.S. Army Corps of Engineers and the US Environmental Protection Agency it is investigating 12 sites.

== Accidents and incidents ==
On November 13, 1944, a USAF Douglas C-47 struck terrain and crashed shortly after takeoff 3.1 miles NW of then Casper AAF, Wyoming. All 11 occupants were killed.

On March 31, 1975, Western Airlines Flight 470 overran and veered off the runway into an irrigation ditch. All 99 people survived the incident, with injuries only occurring during evacuation. The National Transportation Safety Board had concluded that the pilot used poor judgement when it came to executing a missed approach.

== Facilities ==
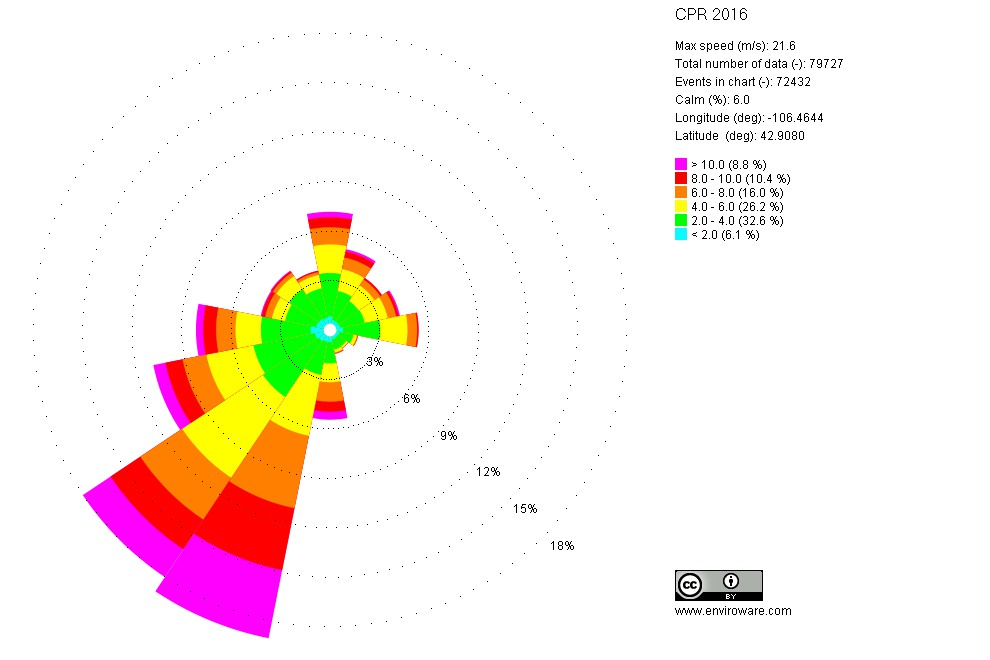
Wind rose showing distribution of wind speed and direction for the airport for the year 2016

The airport covers 5,150 acres (2,080 ha) and has two asphalt runways: 3/21 is 10,165 × 150 ft (3,098 × 46 m) and 8/26 is 8,679 × 150 ft (2,645 × 46 m).

In the year ending December 31, 2022, the airport had 43,126 aircraft operations, average 118 per day: 71% general aviation, 4% scheduled airline, 23% air taxi and 2% military. 131 aircraft at the time were based at the airport: 105 single-engine, 11 multi-engine, 7 jet and 8 helicopter.

The airport is governed by a board of trustees with five members, each serving a five-year term.

== Airline and destination ==
=== Passenger ===
Airlines	Destinations
United Express	Denver

=== Cargo ===
Airlines	Destinations
FedEx Express	Boise, Memphis
FedEx Feeder operated by Corporate Air	Hayden (CO), Rock Springs, Scottsbluff

FedEx operates at a hangar leased by the airport, and receives flights daily from Memphis, Tennessee, operating and accommodating Boeing 757-200s and Airbus A300/310s. FedEx Feeder operator Corporate Air flies a fleet of Cessna 208's to serve freight throughout Wyoming, Nebraska, and Colorado.

== Statistics ==
Busiest domestic routes from CPR (June 2025 - May 2026)
Rank	City	Passengers	Carrier
1	Denver, Colorado	106,450	United

== Ground transportation ==
Taxi service and car rental agencies are available. Several local hotels offer free shuttle service.

== In popular culture ==
In the 2011 comedy film Bridesmaids, an airplane makes an emergency landing at the airport to deplane a rowdy flier and her group of friends.

== See also ==
- List of airports in Wyoming
- Wyoming World War II Army Airfields
