= List of airports in United States minor islands =

This List of airports in the United States Minor Outlying Islands of Oceania is listed alphabetically. For a list sorted by ICAO Code, see List of airports by ICAO code: P.

| Location | ICAO | IATA | FAA IDD | Airport name | Type |
| Howland Island | | | | Kamakaiwi Field | Public (abandoned) |
| Johnston Atoll | ~~PJON~~ | ~~JON~~ | | Johnston Atoll Airport | Public (abandoned) |
| Midway Atoll | PMDY | MDY | MDY | Henderson Field (Note: Not to be confused with Henderson Field (Guadalcanal) on Guadalcanal Island in the Solomon Islands; renamed as Honiara International Airport in 2003.) | Public |
| Palmyra Atoll | PLPA | | P16 | Cooper Airport | Private |
| Wake Island | PWAK | AWK | AWK | Wake Island Airfield | Military |
