= Cheyenne Regional Airport =

Airport in Cheyenne, Wyoming, US

Coordinates: 41°09′20″N 104°48′38″W

Cheyenne Regional Airport Jerry Olson Field
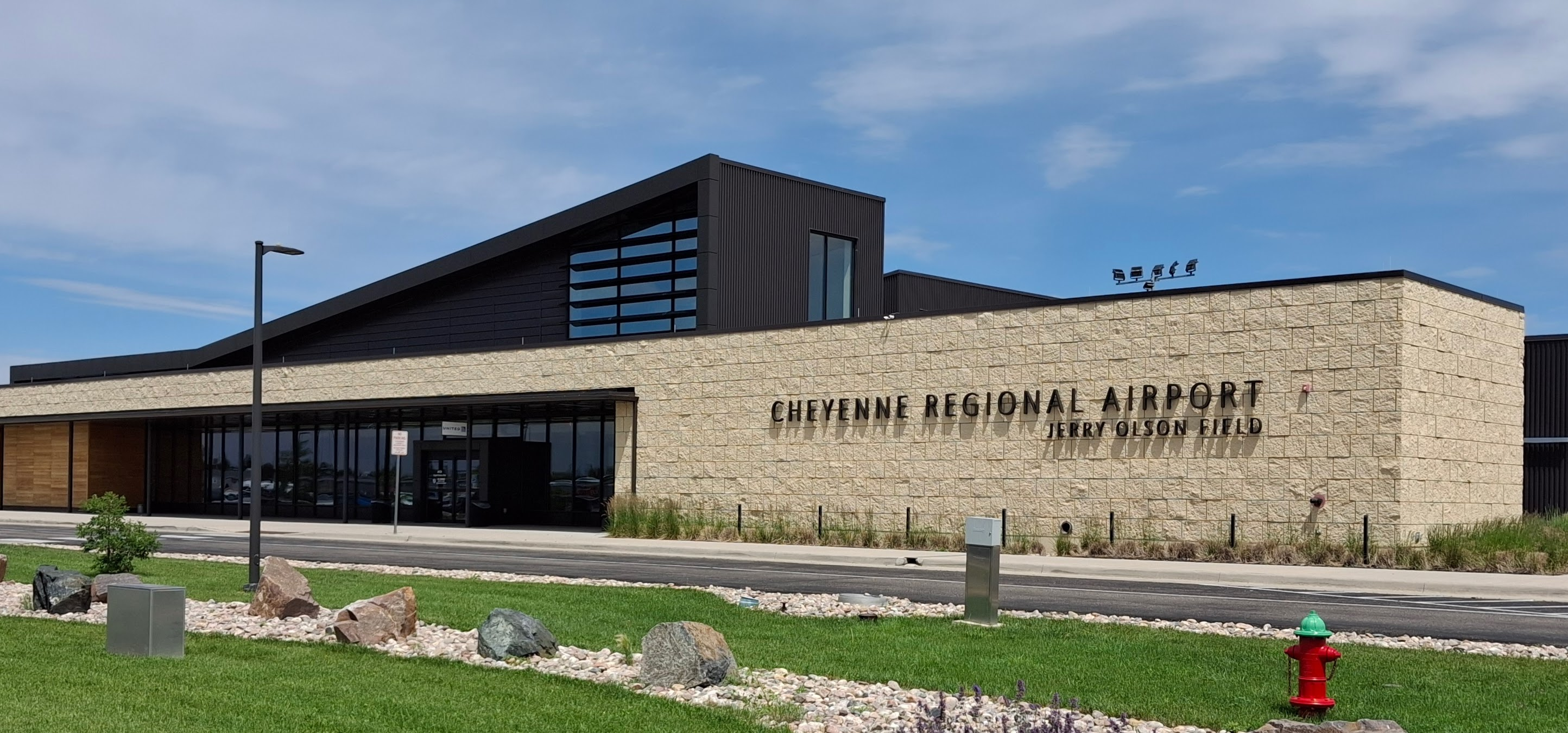
- IATA: CYS; ICAO: KCYS; FAA LID: CYS

Summary
- Airport type: Public/military
- Owner: Cheyenne Regional Airport Board
- Serves: Cheyenne, Wyoming
- Elevation AMSL: 6,160 ft (1,880 m)
- Website: www.CheyenneAirport.com

Map
- Location within Wyoming Location within the United States

Runways
Direction	Length		Surface
Direction	ft	m	Surface
9/27	9,270	2,825	Concrete
13/31	6,690	2,039	Asphalt

Statistics (2020)
- Aircraft operations: 33,250
- Based aircraft: 49
- Sources: airport website and FAA

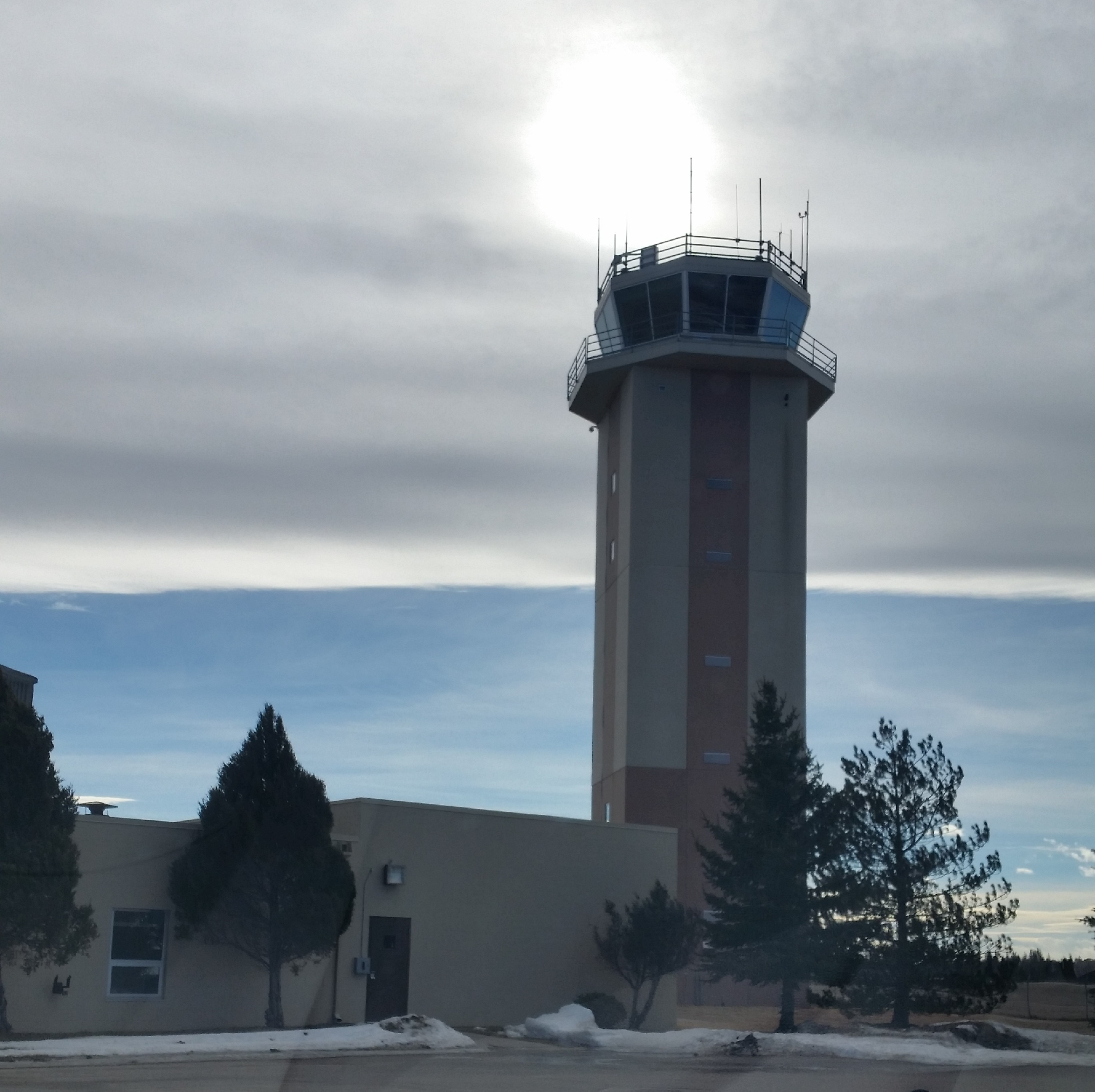
Air traffic control tower at Cheyenne Regional Airport

Cheyenne Regional Airport (IATA: CYS, ICAO: KCYS, FAA LID: CYS) – also known as Jerry Olson Field – is a civil-military airport a mile north of downtown Cheyenne, in Laramie County, Wyoming. It is owned by the Cheyenne Regional Airport Board.

Cheyenne Regional Airport is the home of Cheyenne Air National Guard Base, the main operating base for the Wyoming Air National Guard (WyANG) and the Wyoming Army National Guard (WARNG).

== History ==
The U.S. Post Office gave Cheyenne's aviation its first boost. With the introduction of airmail routes after World War I, Cheyenne civic leaders lobbied to establish Cheyenne as a stop. Buck Heffron piloted the first air mail flight to Salt Lake City on 8 September 1920. He flew a DH-4 that could barely get high enough to clear the mountains and had a maximum speed of 100 mph (160 km/h). The pilot was one of the brave aviators who was guided by a few instruments, maps and landmarks. By the latter 1920s, Cheyenne had become an important crossroads for mail and passenger flights on a transcontinental route between San Francisco and New York as well as a north–south route from Cheyenne to Pueblo, Colorado. Cheyenne was chosen over Denver due to the mountain peaks exceeding 14,000 feet immediately west of Denver. The initial carrier operating on the transcontinental route was Boeing Air Transport. By the early 1930s, Boeing had merged with three other carriers to form United Airlines.

Cheyenne's airport saw its first paying passengers in the 1920s. The first was Elizabeth Brown, a female barber. She enjoyed a ride with World War I pilot, C.A. McKenzie, in a Curtis Oriole biplane. With the step up to the DC-3 in 1937, passengers enjoyed greater comfort and safety. Soon United DC-3s were flying Cheyenne passengers to both coasts and south to Denver.

The Boeing/United Airlines Terminal Building, Hangar and Fountain, built for what would become United Airlines between 1929 and 1934, are listed on the National Register of Historic Places.

During World War II the airport was a completion and modification center for B-17s. Captain Ralph S. Johnson was a test pilot for the then United States Army Air Corps, forerunner to the United States Air Force. The tail turret on the B-17 is known as the "Cheyenne" turret because it was invented at Cheyenne. United Airlines maintained its Douglas DC-3s at Cheyenne; in 1946 it had 1400 employees based locally. Until 1961 the airport was the training center for United Airlines stewardesses from across the country.

The airport was visited by Charles Lindbergh, aboard the Spirit of St. Louis, and Amelia Earhart. Many historic events are chronicled on the walls of the airport restaurant. One of the airport's celebrated visitors in recent times was child aviator Jessica Dubroff, who lost her life when her small plane crashed after takeoff in terrible weather in April 1996.

Because of its high altitude, aircraft manufacturers test their new jetliners at Cheyenne. Recent tests have involved Embraer of Brazil's E-170 and E-190 aircraft as well as Boeing's 737-900 and 787 Dreamliner jets and most recently, the Boeing 737 MAX.

The airport terminal contains plaques of the inductees into the Wyoming Aviation Hall of Fame. The 2013 inductee, Raymond A. Johnson, lived primarily in Cheyenne after 1960.

In November 2018, Cheyenne Regional Airport's current passenger terminal opened. The former terminal has since been proposed to be repurposed as an aviation museum.

A jet bridge was installed at the airport's terminal in 2023, at a cost of $2 million.

== Facilities ==
The field covers 1,060 acres (430 ha) and has two runways: 9/27, 9,270 ft × 150 ft (2,825 m × 46 m) concrete and 13/31, 6,690 ft × 150 ft (2,039 m × 46 m) asphalt.

The airport's terminal has three gates and has room for one more in the future, if needed.

In the year ending 31 December 2020 the airport had 33,250 aircraft operations, average 91 per day: 62% general aviation, 34% military, 3% air taxi and <1% airline. 49 aircraft were based at this airport: 30 single-engine, 7 multi-engine, 2 jet, 2 helicopter, plus 8 military aircraft.

=== Historical airline service ===
In July 1927, the Boeing Aircraft Company began its own airline operating a route from San Francisco to Chicago with stops at Sacramento, Reno, Elko, Salt Lake City, Rock Springs, Cheyenne, North Platte, Lincoln, Omaha, Des Moines, and Iowa City. In 1931 Boeing's airline merged with three other carriers to form United Airlines which expanded the San Francisco-Chicago route to Toledo, Cleveland and New York (Newark Airport) creating a transcontinental route. It used Boeing 247 and Douglas DC-3 aircraft. Cheyenne remained a stop on this route into the 1950s. However, with better aircraft that could fly over the Rocky Mountains, Denver became the focal point for the transcontinental route rather than Cheyenne. In 1954 United Convair 340s flew Denver - Cheyenne - Scottsbluff, NE - North Platte, NE - Grand Island, NE - Lincoln, NE - Omaha - Chicago - Detroit - Philadelphia - New York Newark Airport and Denver - Cheyenne - Salt Lake City - Ogden - Elko - Reno - Sacramento - Oakland - San Francisco. By 1959 United had one roundtrip Convair 340 flight a day between Cheyenne and Denver. All United service to Cheyenne ended in 1960.

In 1926, The Colorado Airlines began a southward route from Cheyenne to Denver, Colorado Springs, and Pueblo. Western Air Express acquired the airline in 1927 and later become Western Airlines. The service lasted into 1934. Another carrier, Wyoming Air Service, began a northbound route from Cheyenne to Casper, Sheridan, and Billings in 1931. This route was extended southward from Cheyenne to Denver, Colorado Springs, and Pueblo from 1934 through 1937. Western Airlines would later acquire Wyoming Air Service and operate a Denver-Cheyenne-Casper-Sheridan-Billings route which lasted until 1979. Various aircraft were used including the Boeing 247, Douglas DC-3, Douglas DC-6B, Lockheed L-188 Electra, and finally upgrading to jets with the Boeing 737-200 by 1969. One 737 jet was operated in each direction every day and continued through the entire decade of the 1970s, making the "milk run" from Denver to Billings with three stops in Wyoming. During the 1960s Western modified the route to operate Los Angeles - San Diego - Phoenix - Denver - Cheyenne as well as extending the northward route from Billings onto Great Falls and Calgary.

In 1947, Challenger Airlines began service with Douglas DC-3s, operating routes from Denver to Billings and Denver to Salt Lake City, making many stops, including Cheyenne. In 1950 Challenger was merged into the original Frontier Airlines (1950-1986). Frontier continued to serve Cheyenne with direct flights to Denver, Billings, and Salt Lake City using DC-3s which were later upgraded to Convair 340s, Convair 580s, and de Havilland Canada DHC-6 Twin Otters. By 1967 Frontier Convair 580s flew nonstop to Denver and direct to Dallas, Oklahoma City, Tulsa, Little Rock, Salt Lake City, and Colorado Springs. By 1977 Frontier began flying Boeing 737-200 jets to Cheyenne, and by 1982 all Cheyenne flights were operating only to Denver or Laramie using 737s. As Frontier began enduring a hard financial burden, the jets were soon discontinued and the carrier reverted to using the Convair 580s under a new designation as Frontier Commuter. All service to Cheyenne was discontinued in January 1985.

After airline deregulation in 1978, smaller regional and commuter airlines began serving Cheyenne with service primarily to Denver. Rocky Mountain Airways began service in early 1979 flying de Havilland Canada DHC-6 Twin Otters and DHC-7 Dash 7s. After the collapse of Frontier in early 1985, Rocky Mountain Airways was the only airline flying Cheyenne to Denver with up to nine round trips daily using Twin Otters. Other carriers include Centennial Airlines operating flights to Denver, Billings, and Salt Lake City with Beechcraft 99 aircraft in 1982; and Air Resorts, which briefly operated to Denver in 1985 using Convair 440 piston aircraft.

In 1986, Aspen Airways began service to Denver using Convair 580s and began an affiliation with United Airlines by September of that year operating as United Express. In 1987 Rocky Mountain became affiliated with Continental Airlines and began operating as Continental Express with up to eight daily round trips to Denver using Beechcraft 1900Cs and ATR 42 aircraft. The United Express service by Aspen ended in 1989 but was reinstated by Mesa Airlines in 1990. In the early 1990s United Express and Continental Express operated a combined total of up to thirteen departures a day to Denver with both airlines flying Beechcraft 1900Cs. Continental Express ended their service in 1995 after Continental Airlines discontinued their hub operation at Denver. Mesa Airlines lost its designation as United Express in 1998 at which time Air Wisconsin began United Express service between Cheyenne and Denver using Dornier 328 aircraft. Air Wisconsin was quickly replaced by Great Lakes Airlines in late 1998 as the United Express airline at Cheyenne using Beech 1900D aircraft. Great Lakes then lost its designation as United Express in 2002 but continued serving Cheyenne under its own branding and a code-share with United. Great Lakes, the only carrier serving Cheyenne, moved its headquarters to the airport and also established an aircraft maintenance base on the field. Some flights to Denver operated with a larger Embraer 120 Brasilia aircraft; however, the company shut down on 26 March 2018, which left Cheyenne with no air service.

In 1996, upstart carrier Western Pacific Airlines began serving Cheyenne by way of their feeder carrier Mountain Air Express using Dornier 328 prop aircraft. Initially flights went to Colorado Springs but were changed to Denver in 1997. The carrier ended service later in 1997 and Western Pacific went out of business in early 1998.

American Airlines established nonstop flights to Dallas/Fort Worth on 15 July 2010, operated by American Eagle using Embraer 145 regional jets. The service however did not become profitable and ended on 3 April 2012. After the collapse of Great Lakes Airlines in 2018, the city of Cheyenne revisited with American and reinstated American Eagle service to Dallas/Fort Worth beginning on 4 November 2018, this time operated by SkyWest Airlines using Bombardier CRJ100/200 regional jets. Service began with one daily flight but was expanded with a second flight during the summer of 2019. With the outbreak of the COVID-19 virus in early 2020 and the associated drop in air travel, all American Eagle service was discontinued.

The city of Cheyenne continued to work with SkyWest Airlines and reinstated service to Denver as United Express using CRJ-200s beginning on 12 November 2020 (SkyWest operates for both American Eagle and United Express). Service was suspended on 16 April 2021, for runway upgrades and returned on 1 November 2021, with two daily flights to Denver. Service was suspended again from 4 April 2023 through 31 August 2023 to allow for renovation and reconstruction of the runway. Service resumed on September 10, 2023.

== Airline and destination ==
Airlines	Destinations
United Express	Denver

== Statistics ==
Carrier shares (January - December 2025)
Carrier	Passengers (arriving and departing)
SkyWest Airlines	58,850(99.72%)
Delta Air Lines	170(0.28%)

Top destinations from CYS (January - December 2025)
Rank	Airport	Passengers	Carrier
1	Denver, Colorado	30,430	United

== Cheyenne Air National Guard Base ==
Cheyenne ANGB occupies approximately 77 acres of leased land on the Cheyenne Regional Airport. Within this area was once the facilities of the former United Airlines Modification Center and former stewardess training center for UAL. The host wing is the 153d Airlift Wing (153 AW) of the Wyoming Air National Guard, currently flying the C-130H Hercules theater airlift aircraft. The 153 AW is operationally-gained by the Air Mobility Command (AMC), and given its proximity to F. E. Warren AFB, was chosen as the first "Active-Associate" unit in the U.S. Air Force and the Air National Guard. As an Active-Associate unit, from 1 July 2006 until 1 September 2015, the 153 AW incorporated both a traditional Air National Guard C-130 airlift squadron, the 187th Airlift Squadron (187 AS), and a full-time active duty Regular Air Force C-130 airlift squadron, the 30th Airlift Squadron (30 AS). Both squadrons shared the same C-130H aircraft. With the inactivation of the 30AS, the 153 AW is once again a traditional Air National Guard unit.

== Accidents and incidents ==
- On October 8, 1946, United Airlines Flight 28, a Douglas DC-4, crashed on the second landing attempt when the pilot approached too high and tried to maneuver to another runway at low altitude. The wing struck the ground and the DC-4 skidded 700 feet. Two passengers out of the 41 on board died.
- On October 9, 1949, a Slick Airways Curtiss C-46 Commando, a cargo flight, crashed 2.5 miles NW of the airport because of loss of control during an instrument approach to Cheyenne with heavy turbulence and heavy icing. All 3 occupants were killed.
- On February 9, 1956, a USAF Douglas C-47 veered off the runway on takeoff and struck a snowbank. Out of 9 on board, the co-pilot was killed by a broken propeller that had penetrated the cockpit.
- On 25 April 1971, a USAF Douglas C-47 crashed while attempting to land at CYS. All 5 occupants were killed.
- On February 27, 1979, a Rocky Mountain Airways de Havilland Canada DHC-6 Twin Otter crashed into rolling terrain shortly after takeoff in visual flight conditions 1.5 miles E of Cheyenne Airport because of maintenance issues and pilot error. There were no fatalities of the 16 on board, there were only 2 minor injuries. The aircraft was later repaired and placed back into service.
- On April 11, 1996, seven-year-old Jessica Dubroff, along with her father and flight instructor, died when her general aviation aircraft crashed after takeoff from Cheyenne Regional in a storm. Dubroff was attempting to be the youngest person to fly across the United States.

== See also ==
- List of airports in Wyoming
- Wyoming World War II Army Airfields
