= FAA airport categories =

U.S. aviation categorization system

The United States Federal Aviation Administration (FAA) has a system for categorizing public-use airports (along with heliports and other aviation bases) that is primarily based on the level of commercial passenger traffic through each facility. It is used to determine whether an airport is eligible for funding through the federal government's Airport Improvement Program (AIP). Fewer than 20% of airports in the U.S. qualify for the program, though most that do not qualify are private-use-only airports.

At the bottom end are general aviation airports. To qualify for the AIP, they must have at least 10 aircraft based there but handle fewer than 2,500 scheduled passengers each year. This means that most aircraft are small and are operated by individuals or other private entities, and little or no commercial airline traffic occurs. Nearly three-quarters of AIP-funded airports are of this type.

Most of the remaining airfields that qualify for funding are commercial service airports and are more dependent on regularly scheduled commercial airline traffic. This is subcategorized into primary airports, which handle more than 10,000 passengers each year, and nonprimary airports, which handle between 2,500 and 10,000 passengers annually. These categories account for over 15% of AIP-funded airports in the U.S.

A third major category contains reliever airports, which are essentially large general-aviation airports located in metropolitan areas that serve to offload small aircraft traffic from hub airports in the region. These account for the remaining 10% of AIP-funded airports.

== History ==
By July 1932, airports received a tripartite classification based on three different ratings: equipment and facilities (A, B, C), size of effective landing area (T, 1, 2, 3, 4) and Aeronautic lighting equipment (A, B, C, D, E, X). The result would be a designation such as "A-1-A".

A proposal was made in 1937 to assign one airports of one of five ratings:

- Super-terminal – 4,500 feet (1,400 m) runways in four directions
- Terminal – 3,500 feet (1,100 m) runways in four directions
- Limited terminal – 2,500 feet (760 m) runways in four directions
- Airport – possess fuel, housing and servicing facilities
- Landing field – all other landing areas

By the end of the year, the "ratings" had become "classes", with "super-terminal" becoming "Class 1" and "terminal" becoming "Class 2".

A report to congress in 1939 inverted the classes, so that Class 1 was now the smallest, and added a fourth level:

- Class I – 1,500 to 2,500 feet (460 to 760 m)
- Class II – 2,500 to 3,500 feet (760 to 1,070 m)
- Class III – 3,500 to 4,500 feet (1,100 to 1,400 m)
- Class IV – 4,500 feet (1,400 m) or more (Note: There were only five airports that met the qualifications for Class IV in September 1940.)

By May 1941, The minimum length of a Class 1 airport runway had gone from 1,500 feet (460 m) to 1,800 feet (550 m), but the system was otherwise unchanged.

However, by April 1944, a fifth class had been added and the ranges slightly increased:

- Class I – 1,800 to 2,700 feet (550 to 820 m)
- Class II – 2,700 to 3,700 feet (820 to 1,130 m)
- Class III – 3,700 to 4,500 feet (1,100 to 1,400 m)
- Class IV – 4,700 to 5,700 feet (1,400 to 1,700 m)
- Class V – 5,700 feet (1,700 m) or more

== Subcategories ==
Primary airports are further subcategorized based on the number of passenger boardings as a fraction of the national total. The categories are:

- Nonhub primary – airports handling over 10,000 but less than 0.05% of the country's annual passenger boardings
- Small hub primary – airports with 0.05–0.25% of the country's annual passenger boardings
- Medium hub primary – airports handling 0.25–1% of the country's annual passenger boardings
- Large hub primary – airports handling over 1% of the country's annual passenger boardings

For reference, there were 899,663,192 boardings at commercial airports in 2018, making the dividing lines 449,832, 2,249,158, and 8,996,632 boardings per year.

Nonprimary airports are subcategorized based on their role. The categories are: national, regional, local, basic and unclassified.

NPIAS Airport Categories

Airports
Primary	Nonprimary
Large	Medium	Small	Nonhub	National	Regional	Local	Basic	Unclassified

== See also ==
- List of airports in the United States
- List of the busiest airports in the United States
