= John Clay =

John Clay may refer to:

- John Clay (Wars of the Roses), English soldier
- John Clay (cattleman) (1851–1934), Scottish-born American cattleman and financier
  - John Clay Livestock Commission, defunct American company founded by the cattleman
- John Clay (chaplain) (1796–1858), English prison chaplain
- John Clay (Nottinghamshire cricketer) (1924–2011), English cricketer
- Johnnie Clay (1898–1973), English cricketer
- John Clay (offensive tackle) (born 1964), American football player
- John Clay (running back) (born 1988), American football player
- John Cecil Clay (1875–1930), American illustrator
- John Granby Clay (1766–1846), British general
- John Morrison Clay (1821–1887), American horse breeder
- John P. Clay (1934–2013), investment banker and founder of the Clay Sanskrit Library
- John Randolph Clay (1808–1885), American diplomat
- The Red-Headed League, an 1891 short story by Arthur Conan Doyle with a character named John Clay

== See also ==
- Jon Clay (born 1963), British former track and road racing cyclist
