= Bruce Jones =

Bruce Jones may refer to:

- Bruce Jones (actor) (born 1953), British actor
- Bruce Jones (American football) (1904–1974), American football player
- Bruce Jones (comics) (born 1944), American comic book writer
- Bruce Jones (surfboards) (?–2014), pioneer in the surfboard shaping industry
- Bruce D. Jones (born 1969), academic, author and political advisor
- Bruce S. Jones (1883–after 1977), American politician in Wyoming

== See also ==
- Bryce Jones (disambiguation)
