= 1906 Wyoming state elections =

A general election was held in the U.S. state of Wyoming on Tuesday, November 6, 1906. All of the state's executive officers—the Governor, Secretary of State, Auditor, Treasurer, and Superintendent of Public Instruction—were up for election. Republicans held onto all statewide offices by landslide margins.

== Governor ==
Incumbent Republican Governor DeForest Richards ran for re-election to a second term, and was renominated at the Republican convention. In the general election, he faced Cody Mayor George T. Beck, whom he defeated in a landslide to win a second term. However, several months into Richards's term, he died in office, elevating Secretary of State Fenimore Chatterton to the governorship and triggering a special election in 1904.

1906 Wyoming gubernatorial election
Party	Candidate	Votes	%	±%
Republican	Bryant B. Brooks (inc.)	16,317	60.20%	+2.73%
Democratic	Stephen A. D. Keister	9,444	34.84%	−4.42%
Socialist	William L. O'Neill	1,236	4.56%	—
Independent	George W. Blain	106	0.39%	—
Majority		6,873	25.36%	+7.15%
Turnout		27,103	100.00%	
Republican hold				

== Secretary of State ==
Incumbent Republican Secretary of State Fenimore Chatterton, who briefly served as acting Governor following DeForest Richards's death, declined to run for re-election. Former Cheyenne Mayor William R. Schnitger, was nominated by the Republican convention for Secretary of State unanimously after he was not selected as the nominee for State Treasurer. At the Democratic convention, current Cheyenne Mayor Daniel W. Gill received the party's nomination. In the general election, Schnitger defeated Gill overwhelmingly.

=== General election ===
==== Results ====
1906 Wyoming Secretary of State election
Party	Candidate	Votes	%	±%
Republican	William R. Schnitger	15,997	60.26%	+0.70%
Democratic	Daniel W. Gill	9,262	34.89%	−3.10%
Socialist	William W. Paterson	1,288	4.85%	+2.40%
Majority		6,735	25.37%	+3.80%
Turnout		26,547	100.00%	
Republican hold				

== Auditor ==
Incumbent Republican State Auditor LeRoy Grant ran for re-election to a third term. He was renominated by the Republican convention and faced Albany County Clerk Thomas J. Dayton, the Democratic nominee, in the general election. Grant was re-elected in a landslide.

=== General election ===
==== Results ====
1906 Wyoming Auditor election
Party	Candidate	Votes	%	±%
Republican	LeRoy Grant (inc.)	15,983	59.91%	−0.50%
Democratic	Thomas J. Dayton	9,472	35.50%	−1.99%
Socialist	Albert L. Vaginer	1,223	4.58%	+2.49%
Majority		6,511	24.41%	+1.49%
Turnout		26,678	100.00%	
Republican hold				

== Treasurer ==
Incumbent Republican Treasurer William C. Irvine was barred from seeking a second consecutive term due to term limits. At the Republican convention, Edward Gillette, a railroad superintendent and a former civil engineer, was nominated as Irvine's replacement. In the general election, Gillette faced former State Representative James M. Lobban, the Democratic nominee. Gillette defeated Lobban in a landslide.

=== General election ===
==== Results ====
1906 Wyoming Treasurer election
Party	Candidate	Votes	%	±%
Republican	Edward Gillette	16,066	60.61%	+0.88%
Democratic	James M. Lobban	9,166	34.58%	−2.26%
Socialist	Mattio Kangas	1,207	4.55%	+1.81%
Prohibition	Clifford J. Sawyer	66	0.25%	—
Majority		6,900	26.03%	+3.14%
Turnout		26,505	100.00%	
Republican hold				

== Superintendent of Public Instruction ==
Incumbent Republican Superintendent Thomas T. Tynan ran for re-election to a third term, but was defeated for renomination at the Republican convention by Converse County Clerk Archibald D. Cook. In the general election, he faced Democratic nominee May Hamilton, whom he defeated in a landslide.

=== General election ===
==== Results ====
1906 Wyoming Superintendent of Public Instruction election
Party	Candidate	Votes	%	±%
Republican	Archibald D. Cook	15,830	59.72%	+1.29%
Democratic	May Hamilton	9,454	35.66%	−3.99%
Socialist	Chalmer E. Cronk	1,224	4.62%	+2.70%
Majority		6,376	24.05%	+5.28%
Turnout		26,508		
Republican hold				
