= Wyoming Stock Growers Association =

American cattle organization since 1872

The Wyoming Stock Growers Association (WSGA) is an American cattle organization that started in 1872 among Wyoming cattle ranchers to standardize and organize the cattle industry but quickly grew into a political force that has been called "the de facto territorial government" of Wyoming's organization into early statehood, and wielded great influence throughout the Western United States.

The WSGA is active to this day. It is best known for its rich history and is perhaps most famous for its role in Wyoming's Johnson County War, from 1889 to 1893.

== Formation ==
Early in Wyoming's territorial formation in 1868, cattle men began lobbying the powerful territorial government and befriended John A. Campbell, the first territorial governor of Wyoming who served from 1869 to 1875.

In May 1871, Campbell sponsored the first organization of cattlemen in the territory and became the president of the Wyoming Stock Grazier's Association. When the second state legislature assembled at Cheyenne in November 1871, the Governor called a simultaneous meeting of the stock growers, and a joint session was held in the hall of the house of representatives.

The Governor's cattle organization soon disbanded, but on November 29, 1873, a new group (made up of many former members of the governor's group) formed the Laramie County Stock Association and became the nucleus of the Wyoming Stock Growers' Association (WSGA).

== History ==
The WSGA historically organized roundups, scheduled cattle shipments, and tracked cattle brands, but was also active, especially before 1900, in eliminating cattle rustling. The WSGA hired professional detectives to prevent and punish cattle thieves.

In the late 19th century, while Wyoming was transitioning from a territory into statehood, the WSGA was one of the few large scale organizations that wielded any type of authority in the region. WSGA members also formed the core of the famous Cheyenne Club, located at 17th Street and Warren Avenue in Wyoming's capital city. It was founded primarily by young men from prominent east coast, British, and European families and became one of the wealthiest and most exclusive establishments on the frontier. The membership not only lavishly entertained socialites, celebrities, and foreign dignitaries at the club, but also was highly instrumental in molding the state's early political, economic, and social infrastructures.

The WSGA held a quasi-governmental status during those years and was very influential in shaping Wyoming's state government and statutes. In that respect, there were four members of the WSGA in the U.S. Congress, as well as several governors and the majority of state legislators that were members in the association. Many of the WSGA's rules and regulations became state laws.

In 1943 when Franklin D. Roosevelt established Jackson Hole National Monument, the association was the first to oppose what they called the "Jackson Hole Seizure" and the establishment of Grand Teton National Park. They advocated for the cattlemen of Teton County to retain their grazing rights and fought hard to change the legislature. While often accused of secrecy and heavy-handedness, the WSGA nonetheless kept extremely detailed records, paperwork, minutes of meetings, and preserved nearly all correspondence to and from the association. The number of letters preserved between the 1870s and the 1930s alone is estimated to be in excess of 50,000, while dozens of boxes exist containing paperwork and other records. The overwhelming majority of records are said to pertain solely to cattle industry organization tasks (such as brand registration, the tracking of cattle shipments, etc.) and underscore the day-to-day importance of the industry association in addition to the political role it played. The records are currently held at the American Heritage Center at the University of Wyoming.

=== Johnson County War ===
Prior to the Johnson County War, Joe Horner (better known as Frank Canton) left his Johnson County sheriff's position to become WSGA's chief of detectives. He later led an army of Texas killers hired by the WSGA that killed two Johnson County settlers in what has become known as the Johnson County War. He was charged for this crime but released.

== Current roles ==
According to the WSGA, the three main roles of today's association are:

- Advocating on issues affecting the cattle industry, Wyoming agriculture and rural community living
- Providing members with timely information regarding events in the cattle industry and the activities of the association
- Promoting the role of the Wyoming cattle industry in resource stewardship, animal care and the production of high-quality safe and nutritious beef

The association currently has a full-time staff of three, along with eight executive officers. To become a voting member of the WSGA, one must raise either cattle, horses, mules, or sheep.

== Notable members ==
- M. V. Boughton, first president and 7th Mayor of Cheyenne, Wyoming
- Alexander Hamilton Swan, second president
- John Clay, sixth president
- Robert Mills Grant, former state representative from Platte County active in the formulation of "branding" law in Wyoming
- Clifford Hansen, president of the association from 1953 to 1955; later Wyoming governor and U.S. senator
- Ray Hunkins, Wheatland lawyer and rancher and the Republican gubernatorial nominee in 2006
- Mary Mead, Jackson rancher and the 1990 Republican gubernatorial nominee
- Otto Franc, a cattle baron, sheriff and judge in the Big Horn Basin region of Wyoming

== Other references ==
- Wyoming. Encyclopædia Britannica, Inc. December 1, 2005.
- Moulton, Candy (August 1, 2005). Texas author Bill O'Neal provides a fresh look at the Wyoming range war that broke out in Johnson County. Cowles Enthusiast Media.
