= Luke Murrin =

American politician (??–c.1885)

2nd Mayor of Cheyenne
- In office January 30, 1868 – January, 1869
- Preceded by: H. M. Hook
- Succeeded by: W. W. Slaughter

Personal details
- Born: County Sligo, Ireland
- Party: Democratic

Military service
- Allegiance: United States
- Branch/service: Union Army
- Years of service: 1861–1865
- Rank: Major
- Unit: Company K, 10th Ohio Infantry; 193rd Ohio Infantry

Luke Murrin (died after 1885) was an American politician who served as the 2nd Mayor of Cheyenne, Wyoming, and was the first following its chartering.

== Early life ==
Luke Murrin was born in County Sligo, Ireland, and immigrated to the United States in 1855. He attended Brown County College and a commercial college in Cincinnati.

== Career ==
On June 3, 1861, he resigned from his position at a Cincinnati post office and enlisted into the Union Army where he was given the rank of lieutenant in Company K, 10th Ohio Infantry. He was later given the rank of colonel and was promoted to major on March 13, 1865. On March 15, 1865, he was commissioned to the staff of the 193rd Ohio Infantry before being mustered out on August 4, at Winchester, Virginia.

=== Mayor ===
On August 10, 1867, a provisional municipal government was organized in Cheyenne, Dakota Territory, with H. M. Hook as mayor. On December 24, the Dakota territorial legislature approved an act incorporating Cheyenne and was later approved by territorial Governor Andrew Jackson Faulk.

On January 23, 1868, the first local elections in Cheyenne following its chartering were held. Murrin was given the Democratic nomination for the mayoralty and defeated Republican nominee W. W. Corlett with 593 to 345 votes.

On August 31, 1868, he placed guards around Cheyenne to prevent attacks from Native Americans. When the Denver Pacific Telegraph line was extended to Cheyenne on January 1, 1869, he exchanged congratulatory messages with William M. Clayton, the mayor of Denver, Colorado Territory. When Murrin left office in January, 1869, Cheyenne was $9,965.47 in debt.

== Later life ==
On December 15, 1877, territorial Governor John Milton Thayer appointed Murrin, Simon Durlacher, and Thomas Lanktree as a penitentiary commission to oversee prisoners in Laramie County, Wyoming. In 1880, he was selected to serve as a delegate from Wyoming to the Democratic national convention in Cincinnati, Ohio. In 1885, he was selected to serve as the chairman of the Wyoming Territorial Democratic Committee.
