= Mayoral elections in Cheyenne, Wyoming =

Mayoral elections in Cheyenne, Wyoming are held every four years, coinciding with the United States presidential election.

== 2024 ==
2024 Cheyenne, Wyoming mayoral election
- November 5, 2024 (general); August 20, 2024 (primary)
Candidate	Patrick Collins	Rick Coppinger	Jenny Hixenbaugh
General	14,992; 58.23%	10,417; 40.46%	Eliminated
Primary	6,290; 56.97%	2,788; 25.25%	974; 8.82%
- Results by precinct Collins: 40–50% 50–60% 60–70% 70–80% Coppinger: 50–60%
Mayor before election
Patrick Collins
Elected mayor
Patrick Collins

Patrick Collins was re-elected mayor by a comfortable margin. The primary election received some attention due to the candidacy of libertarian Victor Miller, who pledged to make many of the city's decisions via an AI chatbot based on ChatGPT called VIC. Initially, VIC was to be listed on the ballot, but Wyoming Secretary of State Chuck Gray ordered Miller's name to be placed instead, calling the chatbot's candidacy "unprecedented and very disturbing."

=== Primary election ===
2024 Cheyenne, Wyoming mayoral primary election
Party	Candidate	Votes	%
Nonpartisan	Patrick Collins (inc.)	6,290	56.97
Nonpartisan	Rick Coppinger	2,788	25.25
Nonpartisan	Jenny Hixenbaugh	974	8.82
Nonpartisan	Victor Miller	327	2.96
Nonpartisan	Buddy Tennant	292	2.65
Nonpartisan	Justin Nadeau	288	2.61
Write-in		82	0.74
Valid ballots		11,041	96.29
Invalid or blank votes		425	3.71
Total votes		11,466	100.00

=== General election ===
2024 Cheyenne, Wyoming mayoral general election
Party	Candidate	Votes	%
Nonpartisan	Patrick Collins (inc.)	14,992	58.23
Nonpartisan	Rick Coppinger	10,417	40.46
Write-in		339	1.32
Valid ballots		25,748	93.99
Invalid or blank votes		1,645	6.01
Total votes		27,393	100.00

== 2020 ==
=== Primary election ===
2020 Cheyenne, Wyoming mayoral primary election
Party	Candidate	Votes	%
Nonpartisan	Patrick Collins	8,489	58.86
Nonpartisan	Rick Coppinger	2,981	20.67
Nonpartisan	Marian J. Orr (inc.)	2,676	18.55
Write-in		83	0.56
Total votes		14,423	100.00

=== Primary election ===
2024 Cheyenne, Wyoming mayoral general election
Party	Candidate	Votes	%
Nonpartisan	Patrick Collins	18,134	65.88
Nonpartisan	Rick Coppinger	9,032	32.81
Write-in		361	1.31
Total votes		27,527	100.00

== 2016 ==
=== Primary election ===
2016 Cheyenne, Wyoming mayoral primary election
Party	Candidate	Votes	%
Nonpartisan	Marian J. Orr	3,674	27.66
Nonpartisan	Amy Surdam	2,834	21.34
Nonpartisan	Pete Illoway	2,457	18.50
Nonpartisan	Jim Brown	1,982	14.92
Nonpartisan	Scott D. Roybal	806	6.07
Nonpartisan	Stephen Ganison	422	3.18
Nonpartisan	John Palmer	281	2.12
Nonpartisan	Rick Coppinger	261	1.96
Nonpartisan	Rex Wilde	173	1.30
Nonpartisan	Albert Romsa	91	0.69
Write-in		302	2.27
Valid ballots		13283	97.98
Invalid or blank votes		274	2.02
Total votes		13,557	100.00

=== General election ===
2016 Cheyenne, Wyoming mayoral general election
Party	Candidate	Votes	%
Nonpartisan	Marian J. Orr	14,383	55.94
Nonpartisan	Amy Surdam	11,162	43.41
Write-in		168	0.65
Valid ballots		25,713	95.09
Invalid or blank votes		1,328	4.91
Total votes		27,041	100.00

== 2012 ==
=== Primary election ===
2012 Cheyenne, Wyoming mayoral primary election
Party	Candidate	Votes	%
Nonpartisan	Richard L. Kaysen (inc.)	7,924	58.33
Nonpartisan	John Palmer	3,892	28.65
Nonpartisan	Kit Carson	1,692	12.45
Write-in		77	0.57
Valid ballots		13,585	93.08
Invalid or blank votes		1,010	6.92
Total votes		14,595	100.00

=== General election ===
2012 Cheyenne, Wyoming mayoral general election
Party	Candidate	Votes	%
Nonpartisan	Richard L. Kaysen (inc.)	13,609	57.97
Nonpartisan	John Palmer	9,792	41.71
Write-in		75	0.32
Valid ballots		23,476	90.32
Invalid or blank votes		2,517	9.68
Total votes		25,993	100.00

== 2008 ==
=== Primary election ===
2008 Cheyenne, Wyoming mayoral primary election
Party	Candidate	Votes	%
Nonpartisan	Richard L. Kaysen	4,374	37.29
Nonpartisan	Jayne Mockler	2,980	25.41
Nonpartisan	Joseph C. Dougherty	2,223	18.95
Nonpartisan	C.J. Brown	1,067	9.10
Nonpartisan	Dru Rohla	713	6.08
Nonpartisan	James A. Ditsch	346	2.95
Write-in		26	0.22
Valid ballots		11,729	98.18
Invalid or blank votes		217	1.82
Total votes		11,946	100.00

=== General election ===
2008 Cheyenne, Wyoming mayoral general election
Party	Candidate	Votes	%
Nonpartisan	Richard L. Kaysen	14,565	57.39
Nonpartisan	Jayne Mockler	10,711	42.20
Write-in		105	0.41
Valid ballots		25,381	91.68
Invalid or blank votes		2,304	8.32
Total votes		27,685	100.00

== 2004 ==
=== General election ===
2004 Cheyenne, Wyoming mayoral general election
Party	Candidate	Votes	%
Nonpartisan	Jack R. Spiker (inc.)	16,011	62.71
Nonpartisan	Dennis Rafferty	9,460	37.05
Write-in		26	0.22
Valid ballots		25,530	95.16
Invalid or blank votes		1,299	4.84
Total votes		26,829	100.00

== 2000 ==
=== Primary election ===
2000 Cheyenne, Wyoming mayoral primary election
Party	Candidate	Votes	%
Nonpartisan	Leo A. Pando (inc.)	4,879	42.39
Nonpartisan	Jack R. Spiker	3,448	29.96
Nonpartisan	Scott D. Roybal	1,958	17.01
Nonpartisan	Dennis Rafferty	1,206	10.48
Write-in		18	0.16
Valid ballots		11,509	98.97
Invalid or blank votes		120	1.03
Total votes		11,629	100.00

=== General election ===
2000 Cheyenne, Wyoming mayoral primary election
Party	Candidate	Votes	%
Nonpartisan	Jack R. Spiker	13,461	56.15
Nonpartisan	Leo A. Pando (inc.)	10,403	43.39
Write-in		110	0.46
Valid ballots		23,974	97.19
Invalid or blank votes		693	2.81
Total votes		24,667	100.00

== See also ==
- List of mayors of Cheyenne, Wyoming
- Elections in Wyoming
- Political party strength in Wyoming
- Government of Wyoming
