= Senator Gill =

Senator Gill may refer to:

- Charles R. Gill (1830–1883), Wisconsin State Senate
- Daniel Webster Gill (1856–1933), Wyoming State Senate
- John Gill Jr. (1850–1918), Maryland State Senate
- Nia Gill (born 1948), New Jersey State Senate
- Warren C. Gill (1912–1987), Oregon State Senate
