= Bruce Riedel =

American intelligence analyst and author (born 1953)

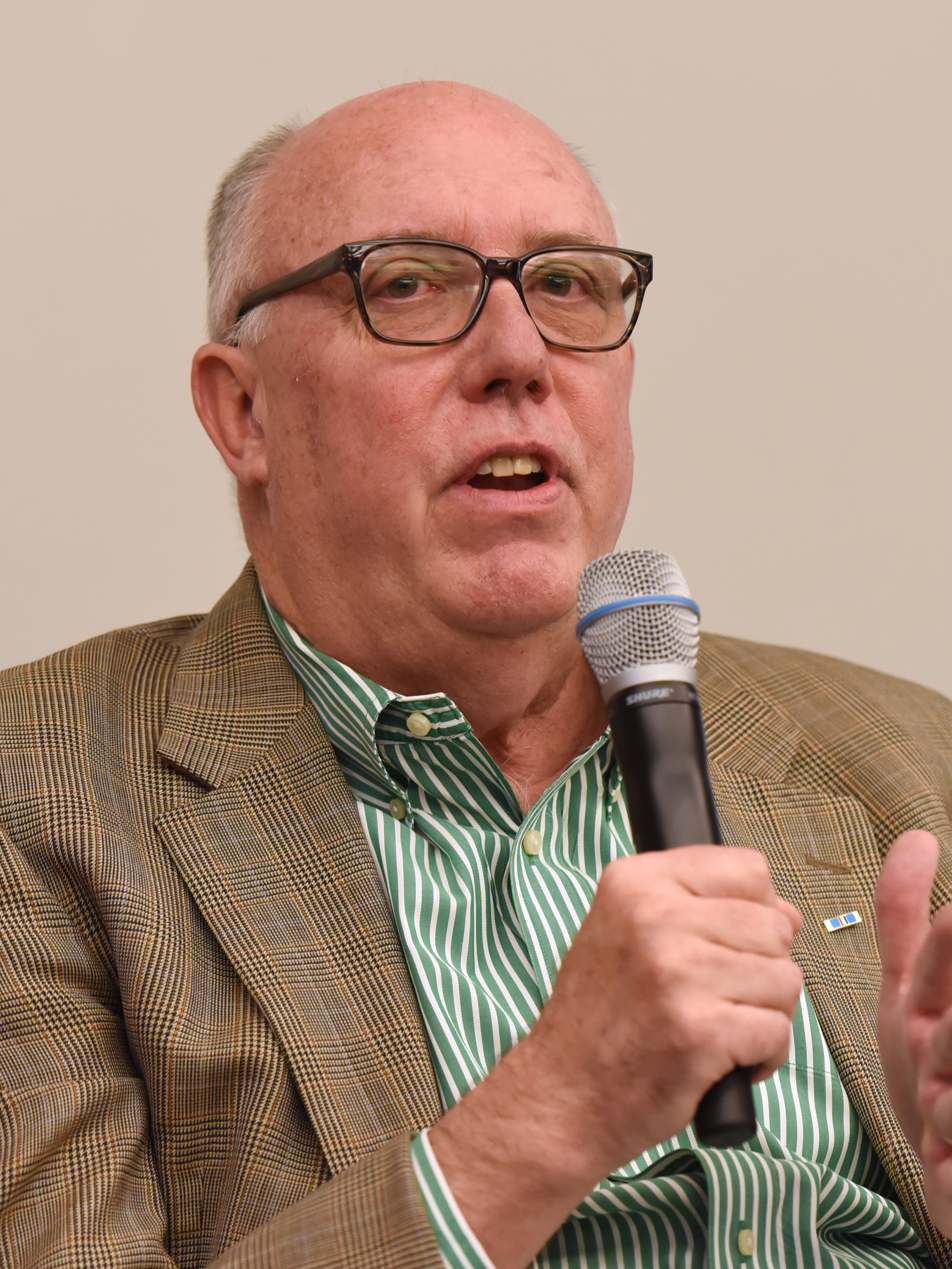
- Riedel in 2017
- Born: Bruce O. Riedel; 1953 (age 72–73); Queens, New York City, U.S.
- Education: Brown University (BA); Harvard University (MA); Royal College of Defence Studies
- Occupations: Intelligence analyst (retired); author
- Employer: Central Intelligence Agency (CIA) (1977–2006)

Bruce O. Riedel (born 1953) is an American expert on U.S. security, the Middle East, South Asia, and counter-terrorism. He is currently a nonresident senior fellow in the Center for Middle East Policy at the Brookings Institution and an instructor at Washington College in Chestertown, Maryland.

Riedel served as an analyst and counter-terrorism expert at the Central Intelligence Agency (CIA) from 1977 until his retirement in 2006. During his tenure at the agency, he advised presidents George H. W. Bush, Bill Clinton and George W. Bush on Middle Eastern and South Asian issues on the staff of the National Security Council (NSC). In 2009, President Barack Obama appointed him chair of a White House review committee formed to overhaul U.S. policy on Afghanistan and Pakistan.

Riedel is a contributor to several periodicals and an author of books examining topics related to counter-terrorism, Arab-Israeli relations, Persian Gulf security, and South Asia, especially India and Pakistan.

== Early life and education ==
Riedel was born in 1953 in Queens, New York City. He was just a year old when his father, a political adviser at the United Nations, moved his family to Jerusalem and later to Beirut. After much travel, Riedel obtained a BA in Middle East history from Brown University) in 1975 and an MA in Medieval Islamic history in 1977 from Harvard University). From 2002 to 2003, he attended the Royal College of Defence Studies in London.

== Career ==
=== CIA: 1977–2006 ===
In 1977, Riedel began a career as an analyst for the CIA, where he spent most of his professional life. After serving 29 years, he retired in 2006. During his tenure at the CIA, he held several positions, including:

- Deputy Chief, Persian Gulf Task Force, CIA (1990–1991)
- Director for Gulf and South Asia Affairs, National Security Council (1991–1993)
- National Intelligence Officer for Near East and South Asian Affairs at the National Intelligence Council (1993–95)
- Deputy Assistant Secretary of Defense for Near East and South Asian Affairs, Office of the Secretary of Defense (1995–1997)
- Special Assistant to the President, and Senior Director for Near East Affairs on the National Security Council (1997–2001)
- Special Assistant to the President and Senior Director for Near East and North African Affairs, National Security Council (2001–2002)

Additionally, Riedel was a member of the Royal College of Defence Studies in London from 2002 to 2003 and a Special Advisor at NATO headquarters in Brussels from 2003 to 2006.

=== 2006–present ===
Riedel was a policy adviser to the 2008 presidential campaign of Barack Obama. In February 2009, Obama appointed him chair of a White House review committee formed to overhaul U.S. policy on Afghanistan and Pakistan.

In 2011, Riedel served as an expert advisor to the prosecution of al Qaeda terrorist Omar Farooq Abdulmutallab in Detroit. In December 2011, Prime Minister David Cameron asked him to advise the UK's National Security Council on Pakistan.

In a February 2013 article published on the website of the Brookings Institution, Riedel discussed "false flag ops" in relation to Algerian counter-terrorism units. In his article "Algeria a Complex Ally in War Against al Qaeda", he described the Algerian counter-terrorism unit DRS and its methods: "[The] DRS is… known for its tactic of infiltrating terrorist groups, creating “false flag” terrorists and trying to control them.", Riedel writes. "Rumors have associated the DRS in the past with the Malian warlord Iyad Ag Ghali, head of Ansar al Dine AQIM’s ally in Mali, and even with Mukhtar Belmukhtar, the al-Qaeda terrorist who engineered the attack on the natural gas plant."

On 14 February 2012, in an article published online in The Daily Beast, Riedel quoted former ISI chief, Gen. (retired) Ziauddin Khwaja, as saying that former Pakistani President Pervez Musharraf "knew bin Laden was in Abbottabad".

Riedel is currently a nonresident senior fellow in the Center for Middle East Policy at the Brookings Institution. He has also taught at the Georgetown University School of Foreign Service and Johns Hopkins University’s Paul H. Nitze School of Advanced International Studies.

== Honors ==
- Secretary of Defense Distinguished Service Medal (1997)
- Distinguished Intelligence Medal (2001)
- Department of State Meritorious Honor Award (2006), for work in the intelligence and defense communities

== Publications ==
=== Books ===
- The Search for Al Qaeda: Its Leadership, Ideology, and Future. Brookings Institution Press. 2010. ISBN 978-0-8157-0451-5.
- Deadly Embrace: Pakistan, America, and the Future of the Global Jihad. Brookings Institution Press. January 17, 2012. ISBN 978-0-8157-2274-8.
- Avoiding Armageddon: America, India, and Pakistan to the Brink and Back. Brookings Institution Press. February 6, 2013. ISBN 978-0-8157-2408-7.
- What We Won: America's Secret War in Afghanistan, 1979–89. Brookings Institution Press. July 28, 2014. ISBN 978-0-8157-2585-5.
- JFK's Forgotten Crisis: Tibet, the CIA, and Sino-Indian War. Brookings Institution Press. November 6, 2015. ISBN 978-0-8157-2699-9.
- Kings and Presidents: Saudi Arabia and the United States since FDR. Brookings Institution Press. November 21, 2017. ISBN 978-0-8157-3137-5.
- Beirut 1958: How America's Wars in the Middle East Began. Brookings Institution Press. October 29, 2019. ISBN 978-0815737292.
- Jordan and America: An Enduring Friendship. Brookings Institution Press. September 21, 2021. ISBN 978-0815739265.
- America and the Yemens: A Complex and Tragic Encounter. Brookings Institution Press. 2023. ISBN 978-0815740131.

=== As contributor ===
- Which Path to Persia? Options for a New American Strategy Toward Iran (PDF). Brookings Institution Press. 2009. ISBN 978-0815703419. (With Kenneth M. Pollack, Daniel L. Byman, and Martin Indyk)
- The Arab Awakening: America and the Transformation of the Middle East. Brookings Institution Press. October 1, 2011. ISBN 978-0-8157-2227-4. (With Kenneth M. Pollack, Daniel L. Byman, Akram Al-Turk, Pavel Baev, Michael S. Dora, Khaled Elgindy, Stephen R. Grand, Shadi Hamid, Bruce D. Jones, Suzanne Maloney, Jonathan D. Pollack, Ruth Hanau Santini, Salman Shaikh, Ibrahim Sharqieh, Shibley Telhami, and Sarah E. Yerkes)
- Becoming Enemies: U.S.-Iran Relations and the Iran-Iraq War, 1979–1988. Rowman & Littlefield Publishin. 2012. ISBN 978-1442208308. (With James G. Blight, Janet M. Lang, Hussein Banai, Malcolm Byrne, and John Tirman)

== Personal life ==
Riedel is married. His wife, Elizabeth, whom he met at the CIA, was a Middle East analyst at the agency as of 2008.
