= Jessica Dubroff =

American pilot trainee (1988–1996)

- Dubroff leaving on her cross-country flight on April 10, 1996, one day before her death
- Born: Jessica Whitney Dubroff; May 5, 1988; Falmouth, Massachusetts, U.S.
- Died: April 11, 1996 (aged 7); Cheyenne, Wyoming, U.S.
- Cause of death: Plane crash
- Resting place: Mount Hope Cemetery; Pescadero, California, U.S.
- Parents: Lloyd Dubroff; Lisa Blair Hathaway

Jessica Whitney Dubroff (May 5, 1988 – April 11, 1996) was a seven-year-old American student pilot who died while attempting to become the youngest person to fly a light aircraft across the United States. On the second day of her attempt, the Cessna 177B Cardinal single-engine aircraft, piloted by her flight instructor, Joe Reid, crashed during a rainstorm immediately after takeoff from Cheyenne Regional Airport in Cheyenne, Wyoming, killing Dubroff, her 57-year-old father Lloyd Dubroff, and Reid.

Although billed by the media as a pilot, Dubroff was not legally able to be a pilot because of her age. She did not possess a medical certificate or a student pilot certificate, since a medical certificate requires a minimum age of 16 and a pilot certificate requires a minimum age of 17, according to U.S. Federal Aviation Administration (FAA) regulations. At the time of her trip, there was no record-keeping body that recognized any feats by underage pilots. Nevertheless, local, national, and international news media picked up and publicized Dubroff's story, and closely followed her attempt.

The U.S. National Transportation Safety Board (NTSB) investigated the crash and concluded that the fatality was caused by Reid's improper decision to take off in poor weather conditions, his overloading the aircraft, and his failure to maintain airspeed. The three factors resulted in a stall and subsequent fatal crash in a residential neighborhood. The NTSB also determined that "contributing to the [instructor's] decision to take off was a desire to adhere to an overly ambitious itinerary, in part, because of media commitments."

== Early life ==
Jessica Whitney Dubroff was born on May 5, 1988, to Lisa Blair Hathaway and Lloyd Dubroff in Falmouth, Massachusetts, and moved to the San Francisco Bay Area when she was four. She was of Ukrainian and Polish descent on her paternal side; the Dubroff surname is an anglicization of Dubrovsky that was adopted when her paternal ancestors came to the United States. Dubroff grew up in an unconventional lifestyle. She was homeschooled and was not allowed to play with toys or watch television.

== "Sea to Shining Sea" flight ==
A short video that shows the 7-year-old pilot participating in pre-flight preparations for a single-engine Cessna 177B. The video also shows rain and cloud cover, the takeoff, and the post-crash wreckage in a residential neighborhood.

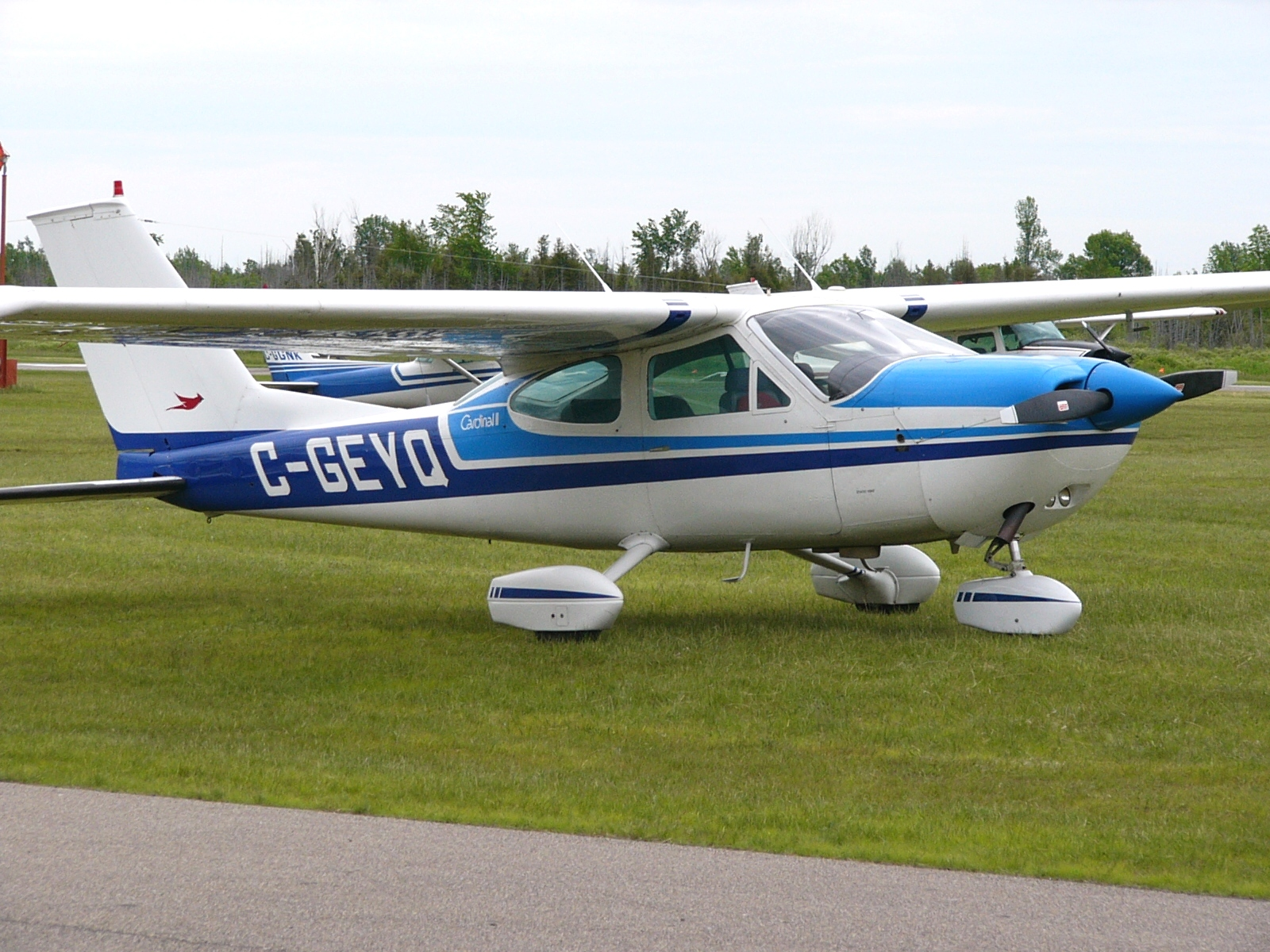
A Cessna 177B Cardinal similar to the aircraft used.

Dubroff began taking flight lessons from flight instructor Joe Reid on her sixth birthday and became enthusiastic about flying. Lloyd Dubroff suggested the idea of a coast-to-coast flight, which his daughter readily accepted, and Reid agreed to provide flight instruction and his aircraft for the endeavor. They decided to name their flight "Sea to Shining Sea"; Lloyd ordered custom-made caps and T-shirts with that logo to distribute as souvenirs during their stops.

Although she had received over 33 hours of flight training, seven-year-old Dubroff did not hold a medical certificate from the U.S. Federal Aviation Administration (FAA), nor any pilot or student certificate. In the U.S., a person must be at least 16 years of age to be eligible for a student pilot certificate, and 17 for a pilot certificate. Since Dubroff was not certified to fly the plane, a rated pilot (normally her flight instructor Reid) had to be at the controls during all flight operations. While the coast-to-coast flight was promoted as a "record" attempt because of Dubroff's young age, there was no known body recognizing record flights by underage "pilots" at the time of her flight (The Guinness Book of Records had officially discontinued its "youngest pilot" categories seven years earlier, because of the risk of accidents).

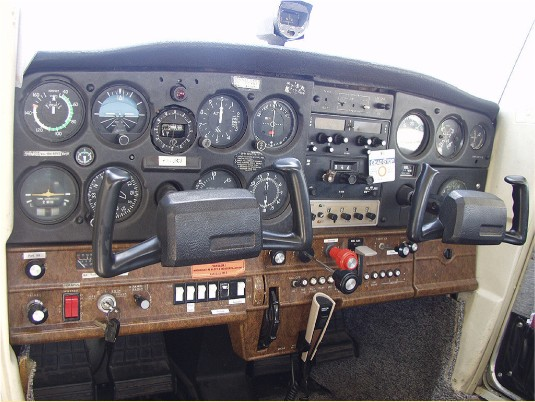
Dual yoke flight control arrangement, similar to Reid's aircraft, in a single engine Cessna.

The flight would be made in Reid's Cessna 177B Cardinal, a four-seat single-engine propeller aircraft manufactured in 1975, registered N35207, which like most aircraft had dual flight controls in the front. Dubroff would sit in the front left seat, Reid in the front right, and Lloyd in the back. It was agreed that Reid would be paid for his services at normal flight instruction rates, plus compensation for the layover time. Reid reportedly told his wife that he considered the flight a "non-event for aviation", simply "flying cross country with a 7-year-old sitting next to you and the parents paying for it."

Nevertheless, Dubroff became an instant media celebrity. ABC News gave Lloyd a video camera and blank cassettes to tape the flight; once the journey began, it was vigorously followed by supporters, media outlets, and others who monitored its progress, reporting each time Dubroff landed or took off. Dubroff slept during one of the flight segments en route to Cheyenne, Wyoming, and was assisted by Reid in one of the landings due to high winds.

== Final flight segment ==
After a long day of flying from their Half Moon Bay, California, departure point, Dubroff, Lloyd, and Reid arrived in Cheyenne the evening before their final flight. They were welcomed in Wyoming's capital city by Mayor Leo Pando. After some media interviews, they were driven to their hotel in the car of a local radio station program director, who recalled them discussing the forecast weather conditions for the next day.

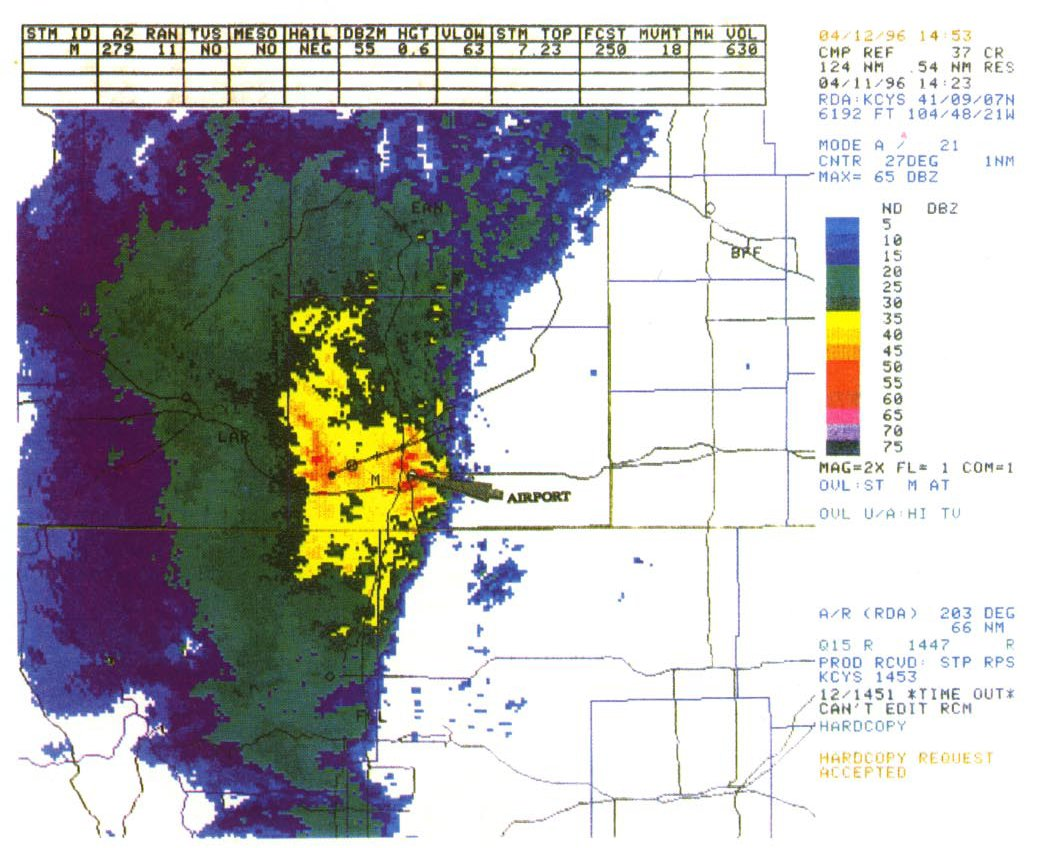
Composite radar image showing precipitation intensity around Cheyenne Regional Airport at time of accident; red is most intense.

As forecast, the weather on the morning of the scheduled flight consisted of an area of heavy precipitation over and to the north and west of Cheyenne, with better conditions to the east, where the flight was headed. As the group was about to board their aircraft, the program director who had taken them to their hotel the previous evening interviewed Dubroff by telephone. When rain began to fall at Cheyenne Regional Airport and the weather seemed to be deteriorating, the director invited her to stay in Cheyenne, but Dubroff's father declined, explaining that they wanted to "beat the storm" that was approaching.

After a telephone discussion with a Casper weather briefer, Reid decided to take off despite the worsening conditions at the airport, and to try to escape the poor weather by turning immediately eastward. He decided to file a visual flight rules (VFR) flight plan, and depart under VFR, to be better able to cope with the heavy weather in his immediate takeoff path and the vicinity of the airport.

As the aircraft began taxiing to the departure runway, the rain intensified and visibility at the airport fell below the three mile minimum required for VFR flight. Cheyenne's control tower advised the Cessna about the reduced visibility and that the "field is IFR". In general, when an airport is officially IFR (normally because of reduced visibility or low cloud ceiling), only IFR or Special VFR operations are allowed. Reid then requested and received from the control tower a Special VFR clearance to allow him to exit the airport's control zone visually, despite the reduced visibility.

== Crash ==
Cessna 177B crash
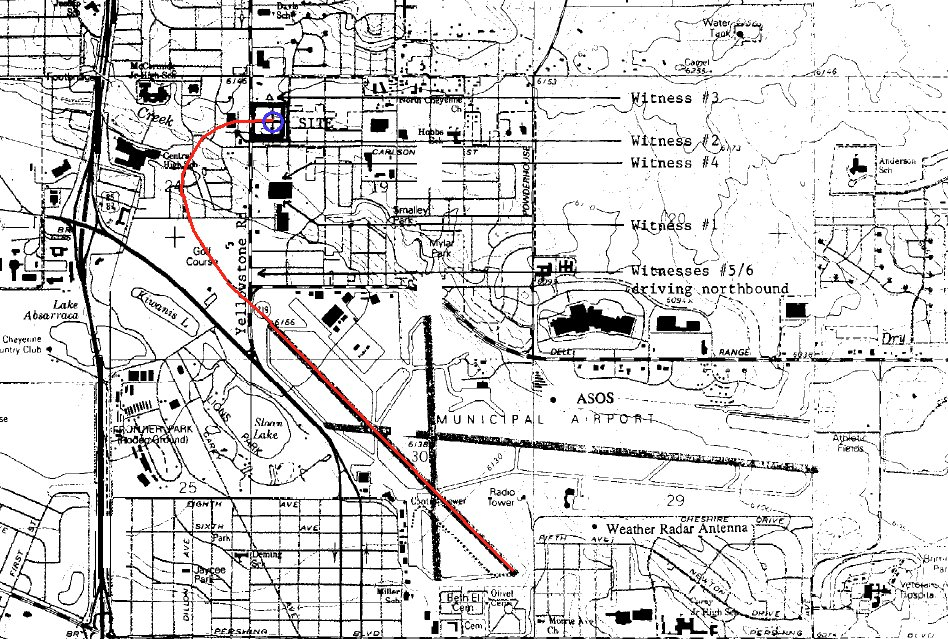
- Dubroff's final flight's path (red) from takeoff to crash (blue circle).

Accident
- Date: April 11, 1996; 8:24 a.m. MDT (UTC−06:00)
- Summary: Loss of control and crash during initial climb
- Site: Cheyenne Regional Airport Cheyenne, Wyoming, U.S.; 41°10′21.35″N 104°49′37.86″W

Aircraft
- Aircraft type: Cessna 177B
- Aircraft name: Cardinal
- Operator: Joe Reid
- Registration: N35207 C/n msn:17702266
- Flight origin: Half Moon Bay Airport; Half Moon Bay, California, U.S.
- 1st stopover: Elko Regional Airport; Elko, Nevada, U.S.
- 2nd stopover: Rock Springs – Sweetwater County Airport; Rock Springs, Wyoming, U.S.
- Last stopover: Cheyenne Regional Airport; Cheyenne, Wyoming, U.S.
- Destination: Lincoln Airport; Lincoln, Nebraska, U.S.
- Occupants: 3
- Passengers: 2
- Crew: 1
- Fatalities: 3
- Survivors: 0

At 8:24 a.m. MDT, Reid's aircraft began its takeoff from Runway 30 to the northwest, in rain, strong gusty crosswinds and turbulence. According to witnesses, the plane lifted off and climbed slowly, with its nose high and its wings wobbling. It began a gradual right turn, and after reaching an altitude of a few hundred feet, the plane rolled out of its turn, then descended rapidly, crashing at a near-vertical angle into Kornegay Court, a street in a residential neighborhood. Dubroff, her father, and Reid were killed instantly by blunt force trauma sustained from impact forces. Reid was allegedly manipulating the controls during this particular flight segment.

== Investigation ==
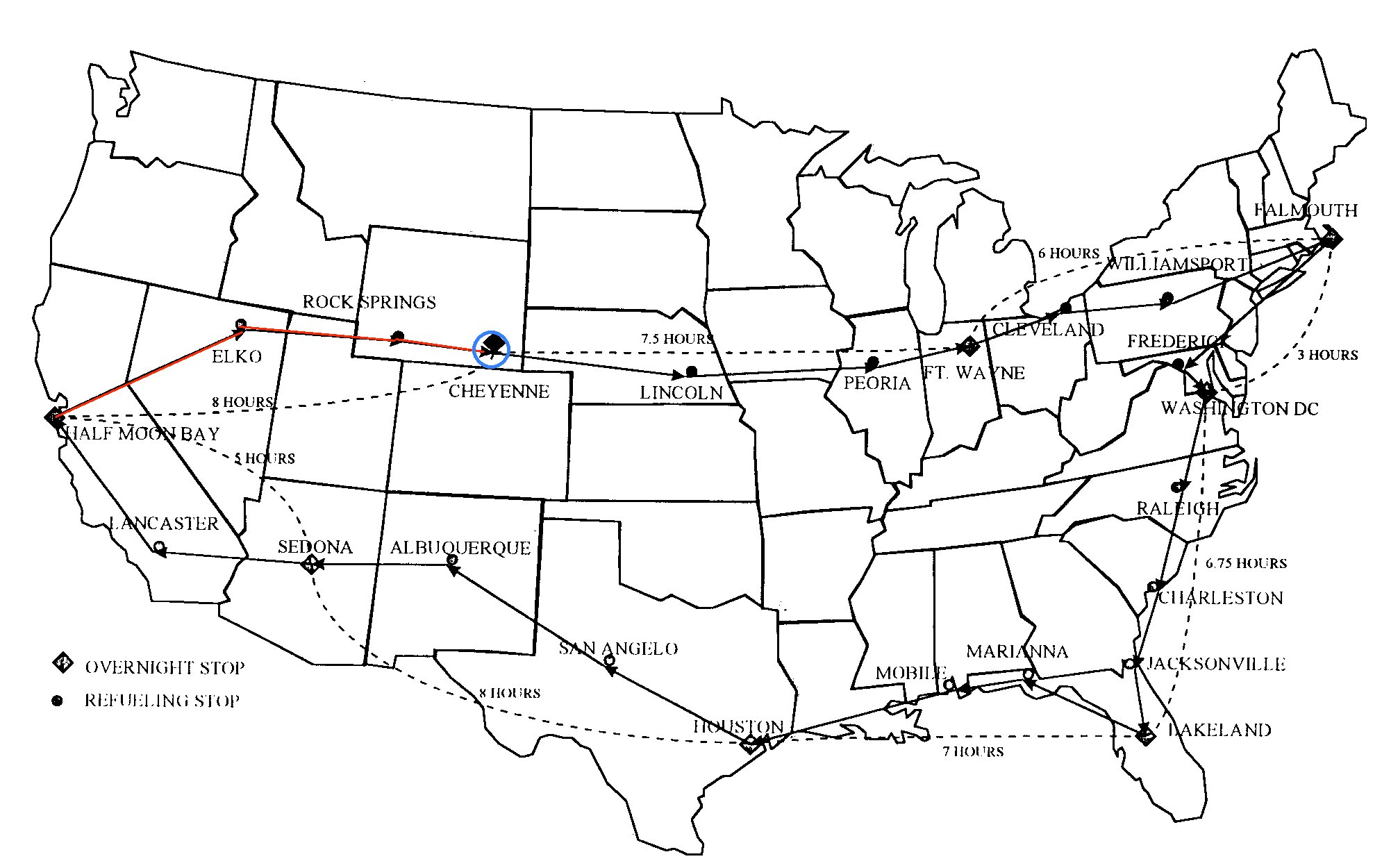
Planned "Sea to Shining Sea" route map; red shows legs flown; blue circle marks accident site

The National Transportation Safety Board (NTSB) investigated the accident and published a detailed final report eleven months later on March 11, 1997. From the official point of view, the pilot in command was flight instructor Reid, who was the only one on board rated to fly the aircraft. The investigation focused on his decision-making prior to takeoff and his actions once airborne.

Several experienced pilots who were at Cheyenne Regional Airport around the time of the crash testified they considered the weather unsuitable for flight, as a thunderstorm seemed to be forming or moving over the airfield. In addition, investigators determined the weight of the aircraft during its takeoff roll exceeded its maximum allowable takeoff weight (MTOW) by 96 lbs, which would have increased the stall speed by about two percent. Since the aircraft was flying in moderate to heavy rain, the NTSB calculated that the water flowing on the wings would have further increased the stall speed by about 1.5%. A higher stall speed reduces the margin of safety at slower airspeeds, such as during a climb.

Like most flight instructors giving dual instruction, Reid was seated on the right side, while the aircraft's primary flight instruments were mounted on the left, in front of Dubroff in this case. Investigators speculated that because of the heavy rain in his immediate climb path, Reid's forward visibility became greatly restricted. To maintain control through the climbing right turn, he would have had to turn his head to the left to see the flight instruments (most critically the attitude and airspeed indicators) and to the right to see the ground through the side window. Such side-to-side head motion, combined with the worsening flight visibility during the climb and the reduced stall margin, could have led to spatial disorientation and loss of control.

=== Probable cause ===
The NTSB concluded that the probable cause of the accident was Reid's "improper decision to take off into deteriorating weather conditions (including turbulence, gusty winds, and an advancing thunderstorm and associated precipitation) when the airplane was overweight and when the density altitude was higher than he was accustomed to, resulting in a stall caused by failure to maintain airspeed." The NTSB further determined that "contributing to the pilot in command's decision to take off was a desire to adhere to an overly ambitious itinerary, in part, because of media commitments."

== Aftermath ==
=== Child Pilot Safety Act ===
The accident and its associated publicity led to federal legislation to prevent similar "record" attempts by underage pilots from taking place in the future. The legislation passed the House of Representatives on September 11, 1996, and the Senate on September 18. On September 27, differences between the House and Senate versions of the bill were resolved. On October 9, President Bill Clinton signed the Federal Aviation Reauthorization Act of 1996, including the Child Pilot Safety Act, into law. The statute prohibits anyone who does not hold at least a private pilot certificate and a current medical certificate from manipulating the controls of an aircraft, if that individual "is attempting to set a record or engage in an aeronautical competition or aeronautical feat."

Since a medical certificate and a private pilot's license have a minimum age requirement of 16 and 17 respectively, the new rule prohibits "child pilots" such as Dubroff and Vicki Van Meter from manipulating the flight controls if they are pursuing a record, and the pilot in command's pilot certificate may be revoked for allowing such activity.

=== Media responsibility ===
After the crash, there were claims that the media frenzy around the "bogus" record attempt contributed to the accident by helping promote the flight and pressuring its schedule. This was supported by the NTSB, which determined that the pressure induced by the intense media attention was a "contributing factor" in the accident. ABC's Ted Koppel reflected on the media's role in the crash on Nightline: "We need to begin by acknowledging our own contribution ... We feed one another: those of you looking for publicity and those of us looking for stories." Koppel ended by asking "whether we in the media ... by our ravenous attention contribute to this phenomenon", and answered: "We did."

Time magazine featured Dubroff's portrait on its front cover, in which she is seen wearing a gray cap with the inscription, "Women Fly". Dubroff was also featured on the cover of People.

=== Civil litigation ===
Lloyd Dubroff was Lisa Blair Hathaway's common-law husband when Jessica and her brother were born. In 1990, Lloyd Dubroff and Hathaway were separated; in 1991, Lloyd, aged 52, married 19-year-old Melinda Anne Hurst, with whom he had a child the following year. In December 1992, Hathaway gave birth to Jessica's full sister, who was conceived while Hathaway lived for a time with Lloyd and Hurst in California.

Before his death in the crash, Lloyd bought four separate life insurance policies, each for $750,000. Two of the policies named Hathaway as beneficiary and two named Hurst, so that each was to receive $1.5 million in the event of his death, ensuring adequate child support for his underage children living with the two women. Lloyd's grown son and daughter (both in their 30s) from a previous marriage were not addressed by these policies.

After the crash, Hurst sued Hathaway for Hathaway's $1.5 million: Hurst's attorney Roy Litherland said in a San Mateo County court that the $1.5 million Hathaway was designated was "in excess of any reasonable level of child support." In December 1996, Hathaway filed a counter-suit against Hurst and Lloyd's estate for $1.5 million, the exact amount of money Lloyd intended, saying Lloyd "gave his word he would care for and support [her] for the rest and remainder of her natural life."

On December 18, 1997, San Mateo County Superior Court Judge Judith Kozloski ruled that the $3 million insurance benefits should be equally split between the two women; all other claims were dismissed.

=== Burial ===
Dubroff was buried at Mount Hope Cemetery in Pescadero, California.

== Dramatization ==
Jessica Dubroff's crash is featured in season 2, episode 4, of the television show Why Planes Crash, in an episode called "Small Planes, Big Problem".
