= Lingle, Wyoming =

Town in Goshen County, Wyoming, United States

- Town
- Location of Lingle in Goshen County, Wyoming
- Coordinates: 42°08′19″N 104°20′46″W
- Country: United States
- State: Wyoming
- County: Goshen

Area
  - Total: 0.31 sq mi (0.81 km^{2})
  - Land: 0.31 sq mi (0.81 km^{2})
  - Water: 0 sq mi (0.00 km^{2})
- Elevation: 4,173 ft (1,272 m)

Population (2020)
  - Total: 403
  - Density: 1,464.6/sq mi (565.47/km^{2})
- Time zone: UTC-7 (Mountain (MST))
  - Summer (DST): UTC-6 (MDT)
- ZIP code: 82223
- Area code: 307
- FIPS code: 56-46790
- GNIS feature ID: 2412902
- Website: www.townoflingle.com

Lingle is a town in Goshen County, Wyoming, United States. As of the 2020 census, Lingle had a population of 403.

== History ==
Lingle, Wyoming is on the Oregon Trail, and has Wyoming historical markers to commemorate the trail and the Oregon Trail Historic Byway passes through the town. Nearby are the Oregon Trail Ruts. The Old Texas Trail also is in Lingle. 1866 - 1897

On July 1, 2022, a canal near the town was breached. This canal breach caused the National Weather Service to issue four flash flood emergencies for the town.

== Geography ==
According to the United States Census Bureau, the town has a total area of 0.31 square miles (0.80 km^{2}), all land.

== Demographics ==
Historical population
Census	Pop.	Note	%±
1920	363		—
1930	415		14.3%
1940	428		3.1%
1950	403		−5.8%
1960	437		8.4%
1970	446		2.1%
1980	475		6.5%
1990	473		−0.4%
2000	510		7.8%
2010	468		−8.2%
2020	403		−13.9%
U.S. Decennial Census

=== 2010 census ===
As of the census of 2010, there were 468 people, 204 households, and 138 families living in the town. The population density was 1,509.7 inhabitants per square mile (582.9/km^{2}). There were 217 housing units at an average density of 700.0 per square mile (270.3/km^{2}). The racial makeup of the town was 97.4% White, 0.2% African American, 0.4% Native American, 1.3% from other races, and 0.6% from two or more races. Hispanic or Latino of any race were 3.0% of the population.

There were 204 households, of which 30.4% had children under the age of 18 living with them, 55.4% were married couples living together, 10.8% had a female householder with no husband present, 1.5% had a male householder with no wife present, and 32.4% were non-families. 30.4% of all households were made up of individuals, and 13.7% had someone living alone who was 65 years of age or older. The average household size was 2.29 and the average family size was 2.82.

The median age in the town was 43.9 years. 24.1% of residents were under the age of 18; 6.4% were between the ages of 18 and 24; 20.3% were from 25 to 44; 29.9% were from 45 to 64; and 19.2% were 65 years of age or older. The gender makeup of the town was 43.6% male and 56.4% female.

=== 2000 census ===
As of the census of 2000, there were 510 people, 210 households, and 140 families living in the town. The population density was 1,653.6 people per square mile (635.2/km^{2}). There were 234 housing units at an average density of 758.7 per square mile (291.4/km^{2}). The racial makeup of the town was 96.67% White, 0.20% Pacific Islander, 1.57% from other races, and 1.57% from two or more races. Hispanic or Latino of any race were 4.12% of the population.

There were 210 households, out of which 28.1% had children under the age of 18 living with them, 57.6% were married couples living together, 6.2% had a female householder with no husband present, and 32.9% were non-families. 28.6% of all households were made up of individuals, and 11.4% had someone living alone who was 65 years of age or older. The average household size was 2.43 and the average family size was 2.98.

In the town, the population was spread out, with 26.7% under the age of 18, 6.1% from 18 to 24, 26.1% from 25 to 44, 24.3% from 45 to 64, and 16.9% who were 65 years of age or older. The median age was 40 years. For every 100 females, there were 93.9 males. For every 100 females age 18 and over, there were 98.9 males.

The median income for a household in the town was $33,235, and the median income for a family was $38,036. Males had a median income of $30,313 versus $22,500 for females. The per capita income for the town was $16,559. About 4.0% of families and 9.4% of the population were below the poverty line, including 4.7% of those under age 18 and 13.2% of those age 65 or over.

== Education ==
Public education in the town of Lingle is provided by Goshen County School District #1.

== Highways ==
- U.S. Highway 26
- U.S. Highway 85
- WYO 156

== Notable people ==
- Jerry Hill (American football) (born 1939), NFL running back for the Baltimore Colts
- Bill Nation (1925–2022), 45th and 50th Mayor of Cheyenne, Wyoming
- Former Wyoming Supreme Court Justice Richard V. Thomas was reared in Lingle.

== See also ==
- List of municipalities in Wyoming
