= Jervis Joslin =

American politician

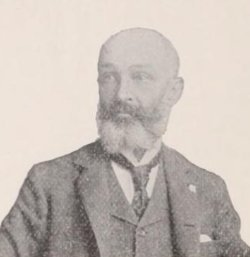

5th Mayor of Cheyenne, Wyoming
- In office 1871–1872
- Preceded by: J. H. Martin
- Succeeded by: M. Sloan

Member of the Colorado Territorial Legislature

Personal details
- Born: September 29, 1835 Poultney, Vermont, United States
- Died: January 4, 1899 (aged 63) Denver, Colorado, United States
- Spouse: Marian F. Hastings
- Children: 2

Jervis Joslin (September 29, 1835 – January 4, 1899) was an American politician who served as the 5th Mayor of Cheyenne, Wyoming.

== Early life ==
Jervis Joslin was born on September 29, 1835, to Joseph Joslin and Caroline C. Ruggles in Poultney, Vermont. After graduating from school he started working in jewelry businesses in Poultney. In 1866, he moved to Denver in the Colorado Territory and started a business partnership with Boyd Park named Joslin & Park that would last until his death in 1899.

Joslin and Park established jewelry businesses in Denver in May 1866, Cheyenne on December 17, 1867, Salt Lake City in 1871, and Leadville in 1879. In 1867, he married Marian F. Hastings and would later have a son and daughter with her. In 1868, their store in Cheyenne burned down causing $3,000 to $4,000 in losses, but it was rebuilt.

== Politics ==
In 1869, he was nominated for a seat in the Wyoming Territorial legislature. In 1871, he was elected as mayor of Cheyenne, Wyoming Territory. In 1873, he was elected as a member of the Colorado Territorial Legislature.

== Later life ==
In 1880, he closed the jewelry store in Cheyenne and consolidated Joslin & Park in Leadville. In 1887, the store in Leadville was closed and he moved to Denver.

Joslin died from pneumonia in Denver, Colorado, on January 4, 1899. In March 1900, Samuel Culver Park, the son of Boyd Park, purchased Joslin's interest in the business from his estate and the name of his business was changed from Joslin & Park to Boyd Park.
