= Alexander Hamilton Swan =

American businessman (1831–1905)

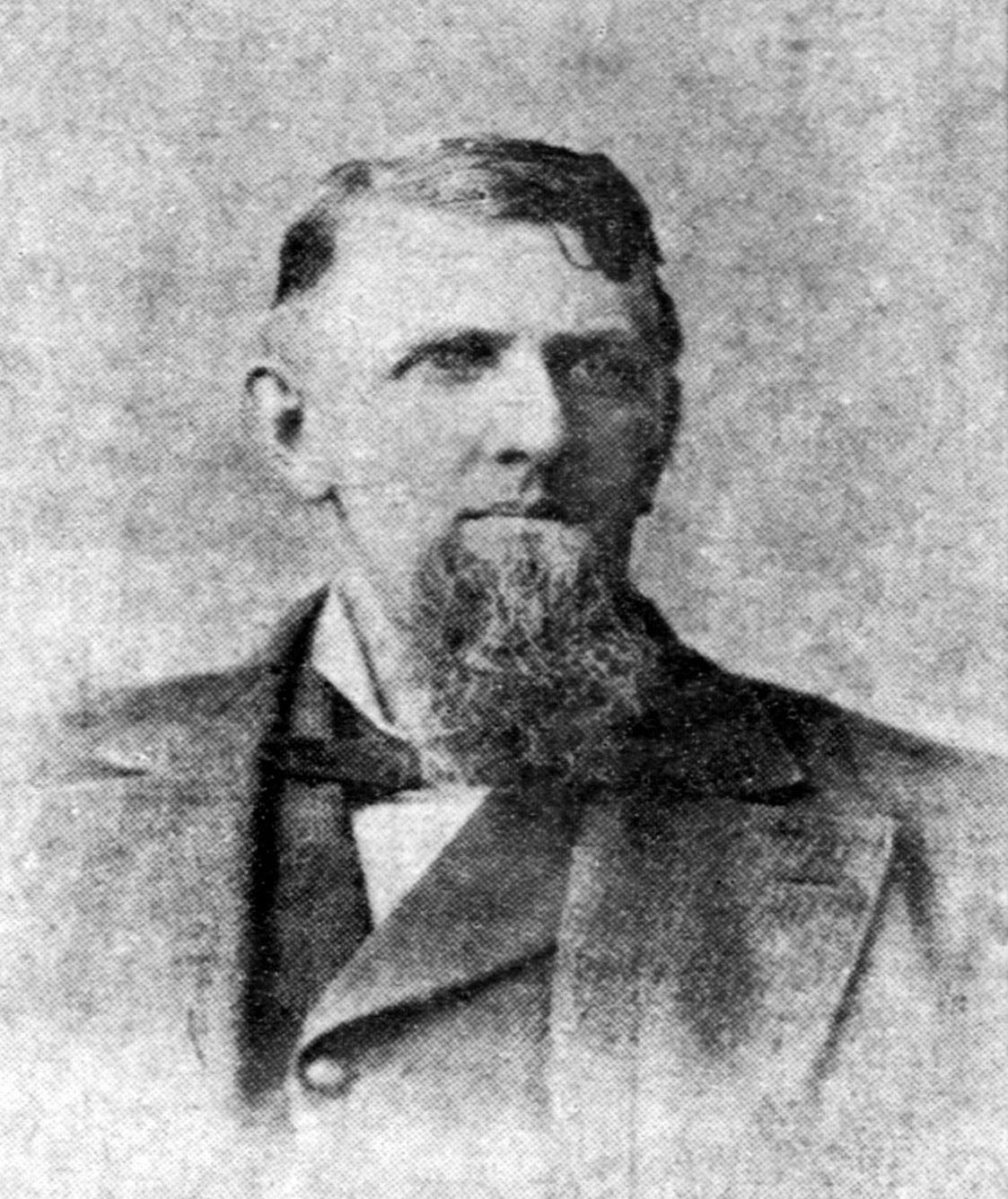
- Portrait photograph of Swan
- Born: November 24, 1831; Carmichaels, Pennsylvania, United States
- Died: August 9, 1905 (aged 73); Utah
- Occupations: Businessman, politician
- Known for: Founding the Wyoming-based Swan Land and Cattle Company
- Spouse: Ann McCollough
- Children: 2

2nd President of the Wyoming Stock Growers Association
- In office 1876–1882
- Preceded by: M. V. Boughton

Member of the Wyoming Territory Legislative Council
- In office 1878

Member of the Iowa House of Representatives from the 22nd district
- In office January 10, 1870 – January 7, 1872

Personal details
- Party: Republican

Alexander Hamilton Swan (November 24, 1831 – 1905) was an American businessman and politician who served as a member of the Iowa House of Representatives from 1870 to 1872 and founded the Wyoming-based Swan Land and Cattle Company among other Wyoming livestock-related companies. He served as a Republican member of the legislative assembly of the Wyoming Territory. After having amassed vast wealth through his ventures in Wyoming, Swan lost his fortune in 1887. He relocated to Odgen, Utah, and died in 1905.

== Early life ==
Swan was born on November 24, 1831, in Carmichaels, Pennsylvania, in Greene County near Pittsburgh. His family was not wealthy during his childhood. He was a member of the Presbyterian Church.

== Life and career in Iowa ==
In 1862, Swan settled near Indianola, in Warren County, Iowa. From January 10, 1870, to January 7, 1872, Swan served as a member of the Iowa House of Representatives, representing the 22nd district. His district represented Warren County.

In Iowa, he met and married Ann McCollough. While living in Indianolo, they expanded their family by having two children: William R. and Louise.

== Life and career in the Wyoming Territory ==
Swan left Iowa and moved to the Wyoming Territory. in the 1870s. Swan amassed a significant fortune in Wyoming, but ultimately squandered it.

In 1873, he and other family members founded the Swan Brothers Cattle Company, one of the largest cattle companies in the Western United States. Alexander managed the business, which began with a 3,000 head cattle herd on land along Chugwater Creek in Southeastern Wyoming (where he developed the Two Bar Ranch). His main partners were his brothers (Henry, William, and Thomas “Black Tom”). By the year 1882, the herd he managed for the company numbered 33,000. Swan was involved in the construction of the Union Stockyards in Omaha, Nebraska.

In 1876, Swan was elected as the second-ever president of the Laramie County Stock Association, the precursor organization to the Wyoming Stock Growers Association. He served as president of the org and the successor Wyoming Stock Growers Association until 1882.

In 1877, Swan was elected as a Republican to the council in the fifth Wyoming legislative assembly. He served a one-year term. In 1880, Swan unsuccessfully ran as the Republican nominee for the Wyoming Territory's non-voting delegate to the United States House of Representatives. In 1880. Swan became a member of the Cheyenne Club.

In 1883, Swan incorporated the Swan Land and Cattle Company, with operations based in Chugwater, Wyoming. He sold the corporation to Scottish investors for $2,550,825, but remained manager of the corporation. In the 1880s, the company cattle ranch was estimated to have 100,000 cattle on its millions of acres.

Swan organized the creation of four other companies. One of these was the Wyoming Hereford Association (founded in 1883), which later became the Wyoming Hereford Ranch near Cheyenne, Wyoming. He established the aforementioned ranch after being persuaded by his associate George Morgan to import hereford cattle from England. Swan was the first rancher in the to introduce purebred hereford cattle from England to the United States. Swan was also the founder president of the Swan & Frank Live-Stock Company; the National Cattle Company; and the Swan, Frank & Anthony Cattle Company. His business partners in these were Joseph Frank, James Converse, and Godfrey Syndacker. In 1880, Chicago businessman Frank had become a new business associate of Swan's, which had led to the 1881 establishment of the Swan & Frank Live-Stock Company. Around the same time that Frank began doing business with Swan and his brothers, Joseph Rosenbaum also became involved as a shareholder and associate of their ventures. In 1881, Swan also founded the National Cattle Company, with shares being held by Swan and his siblings, the Rosenbaum brothers, Amasa R. Converse, members of the Snydacker family (the Chicago-based family of banker Godfrey Snydacker).

By his early 50s, Swan was involved in 20 business ventures with massive amounts of capital between them. While his business primarily involved cattle he was also invested in banks, railways, some city real estate, and miscellaneous small businesses.

Swan was known to invest on speculation. The failure of several such investments that he had taken on debt to acquire, as well as a significant loss of his cattle during the winter of 1886–87, led Swan to abruptly lose his vast wealth. Swan lost between 300,000 and 400,000 head of cattle in Wyoming in that period, losses attributed to poor practices on his part (such as overstocking and overgrazing) and to the ravage of severe winter storms. Critics of his accused him of poor management of his hererd, and alleged that he had previously inflated his head count of his herd. He filed for bankruptcy. Swan was fired by the board of directors from his position as president of his namesake Swan Land and Cattle Company, with John Clay being brought in to replace him. Clay had been among the harsh critics of Swan and Swan's practices as a manager. His hereford operation was purchased by Cheyenne businessmen Henry Altman and Dan McIllvain. Prior to losing his fortune, Swan had begun construction on an elaborate residence in Cheyenne. However, after losing his fortune he left Cheyenne, and the incomplete residence was purchased by David D. Dare, who completed it. The resulting structure was thereafter dubbed "Castle Dare".

== Later life ==
Swan's death certificate

Having lost his fortune, Swan left Wyoming in 1888. He settled in Ogden, Utah prior to his death in 1905. Despite his one-time prominence, Swan died in obscurity.

== Legacy ==
The Swan Land and Cattle Company that Swan founded in 1883 continued to operate until 1926, when it was liquidated and reorganized into the new Swan Company. That company, in turn, operated until being liquidated and dissolved on November 30, 1950. The Swan Land and Cattle Company Headquarters remains standing, having been added in 1964 as a National Historic Landmark on the National Register of Historic Places.

The hereford ranch that Swan founded continues to operate, and is now the oldest known continuous breed operation in the United States.
