= Michael J. Sullivan (Wyoming politician) =

American politician

Wyoming Labor Commissioner
- In office 1983–1995
- Preceded by: Vernie Martin

Member of the Cheyenne, Wyoming city council
- In office 1976–1980

Personal details
- Born: c. 1943/1944
- Party: Democratic

Military service
- Allegiance: United States
- Branch/service: United States Air Force
- Rank: Colonel

Michael J. Sullivan (born c. 1943/1944) is an American politician who served as the Wyoming Labor Commissioner and was active in local politics in Cheyenne, Wyoming.

== Early life and education ==
Michael J. Sullivan was born c. 1943/1944. He graduated from Louisiana University with a bachelor's degree in business and graduated from the University of Northern Colorado with a master's degree in business. He served in the United States Air Force and retired as a colonel.

== Career ==
=== Department of Labor ===
From 1970 to 1975, Sullivan served as a Wage and Hour Inspector for the Wyoming Department of Labor. On May 14, 1975, Wyoming Labor Commissioner Vernie Martin announced the appointment of Sullivan as Deputy Labor Commissioner.

In 1983, Martin was put on trial for charges of attempting to defraud Wyoming through a false travel voucher. Sullivan was selected by Governor Edgar Herschler to serve as acting Labor Commissioner and served until his retirement in 1995.

=== Local politics ===
In 1976, Sullivan filed to run for one of two city council seats in Cheyenne, Wyoming, from Ward 3. In the primary election he placed first ahead of incumbent council members, Delmer Woods and Victoria Anderson. In the general election he and Carol E. Clark placed first and second defeating both of the incumbents. In 1980, he ran in Cheyenne's mayoral election but placed fourth behind incumbent Mayor Don Erickson, former Mayor Bill Nation, and City Council President John Rogers. In 1982, he unsuccessfully ran for a seat on the Cheyenne city council.

In 1977, the Cheyenne city council voted in favor of a maximum 10¢ per hour on-street parking fee. Sullivan opposed the fee and instead supported an optional sales tax. In 1980, he launched a petition drive to place a referendum on a mineral severance tax onto the ballot with the support of the AFL–CIO and the Wyoming Employee Associations.

== Later life ==
In 2002, Sullivan announced that he would seek the Democratic nomination for the Wyoming House of Representatives in the 8th district. He won in the Democratic primary, but lost in the general election to incumbent Republican Representative Larry Meuli.

== Electoral history ==
1976 Cheyenne, Wyoming city council Ward 3 election
Primary election
Party	Candidate	Votes	%
Nonpartisan	Mike Sullivan	1,621	24.56%
Nonpartisan	Delmer Woods (incumbent)	1,495	22.65%
Nonpartisan	Carol E. Clark	1,391	21.08%
Nonpartisan	Victoria Anderson (incumbent)	1,025	15.53%
Nonpartisan	R. J. Darling	458	6.94%
Nonpartisan	Rudy Karen	435	6.59%
Nonpartisan	James M. Kubalanza	175	2.65%
Total votes		6,600	100.00%
General election
Nonpartisan	Mike Sullivan	3,559	31.18%
Nonpartisan	Carol E. Clark	3,234	28.33%
Nonpartisan	Delmer Woods (incumbent)	2,700	23.65%
Nonpartisan	Victoria Anderson (incumbent)	1,923	16.84%
Total votes		11,416	100.00%

1980 Cheyenne, Wyoming mayoral primary
Party	Candidate	Votes	%
Nonpartisan	Don Erickson (incumbent)	4,338	30.92%
Nonpartisan	Bill Nation	3,439	24.51%
Nonpartisan	John Rogers	3,375	24.05%
Nonpartisan	Mike Sullivan	2,629	18.74%
Nonpartisan	Carl Johnson	251	1.79%
Total votes		14,032	100.00%

2002 Wyoming House of Representatives 8th district election
Primary election
Party	Candidate	Votes	%
Democratic	Michael J. Sullivan	557	51.48%
Democratic	Joe Barrett	525	48.52%
Total votes		1,082	100.00%
General election
Republican	Larry Meuli (incumbent)	2,126	54.68%
Democratic	Michael J. Sullivan	1,762	45.32%
Total votes		3,888	100.00%
