= Vicki Van Meter =

American aviator (1982–2008)

- Vicki Van Meter standing in front of an airplane wearing an audio headset.
- Born: March 13, 1982; Meadville, Pennsylvania, U.S.
- Died: March 15, 2008 (aged 26); Meadville, Pennsylvania, U.S.
- Education: Edinboro University of Pennsylvania
- Occupation: Aviator
- Known for: Long-distance flying as a child pilot
- Website: Official website

Victoria Louise Van Meter (March 13, 1982 – March 15, 2008) was an American aviator. She was known for setting several distance-flying records for child pilots. At the age of 11, she became the youngest pilot to fly east to west across the continental United States of America, and the youngest female pilot to cross in either direction.

== Early life ==
Van Meter first manipulated the controls of an airplane at the age of 10. On September 20, 1993, at the age of 11, she made headlines when she flew from Augusta, Maine, to San Diego, California, in a Cessna 172. A year later, she flew a Cessna 210 over the Atlantic Ocean to Scotland.

She visited the White House and appeared on The Tonight Show.

Soon after her European flight Van Meter gave up flying.

In 2003, Van Meter was featured with 36 other female pilots in the traveling exhibit Women and Flight — Portrait of Contemporary Women Pilots, based on a book of the same name by Carolyn Russo.

Pursuant to the Federal Aviation Reauthorization Act of 1996 signed into law by President Bill Clinton on October 9, 1996, after the death of Jessica Dubroff, it is no longer legal in the United States (under 49 USC § 44724) to attempt to set records as a student pilot, which effectively means that some of the records set by Van Meter will never be legally broken by an American.

== Personal life ==
Van Meter served as a Peace Corps volunteer in Moldova after graduating from Edinboro University with a degree in criminal justice. She worked as an insurance-company investigator and had made plans to pursue graduate studies.

== Death ==
Van Meter died at her home in Meadville, Pennsylvania, on March 15, 2008, from a self-inflicted gunshot wound at the age of 26. Her suicide surprised her family, who believed that she had been coping with her depression.

== See also ==
- Barrington Irving
- Jessica Dubroff
