= James D. Van Velzor =

American politician

Member of the Wyoming House of Representatives
- In office 1967–1969
- In office 1975–1976

49th Mayor of Cheyenne, Wyoming
- In office 1972–1973
- Preceded by: Floyd Holland
- Succeeded by: Bill Nation

Personal details
- Born: April 11, 1922 Warren, Michigan, U.S.
- Died: February 11, 2000 (aged 77)
- Party: Republican

James D. Van Velzor (April 11, 1922 – February 11, 2000) was an American politician. He served as a Republican member of the Wyoming House of Representatives.

== Life and career ==
Van Velzor was born in Warren, Michigan.

Van Velzor served in the Wyoming House of Representatives from 1967 to 1969 and again from 1975 to 1976.

Van Velzor died on February 11, 2000, at the age of 77.
