= Bryce Jones =

Bryce Jones may refer to:

- Bryce Dejean-Jones (1992–2016), American basketball player
- Bryce Jones (basketball, born 1994), American basketball player

== See also ==
- Bruce Jones (disambiguation)
