= Ira L. Hanna =

American politician

36th Mayor of Cheyenne, Wyoming
- In office January 1, 1944 – May 8, 1944
- Preceded by: Ed Warren
- Succeeded by: Bruce S. Jones

Laramie County Assessor
- In office 1930s – December 1943
- Succeeded by: W. H. Hale Jr.

Laramie County Treasurer
- In office January 1, 1925 – 1930s
- Preceded by: John Schuneman

Personal details
- Born: Ira L. Hanna; November 4, 1908 Appleby, Texas, U.S.
- Died: April 23, 1974 (aged 65) Eastland, Texas, U.S.
- Party: Republican
- Spouse: Neoma Smith

Ira L. Hanna (November 4, 1908 – April 23, 1974) was an American politician who served as the 36th Mayor of Cheyenne, Wyoming. After serving in local Laramie County politics Hanna briefly served as mayor before being convicted for bribery charges alongside three members of the police department.

== Early life ==
Ira L. Hanna was born on November 4, 1908, in Appleby, Texas. Hanna served as the treasurer of Laramie County during the 1920s and 1930s. Hanna was elected as Laramie County's assessor as a Republican and served until his resignation in December 1943, after being elected to the mayoralty of Cheyenne, and deputy county assessor W. H. Hale Jr. was appointed by the Laramie County Commission to succeed him.

== Mayor ==
Hanna announced that he would run for mayor of Cheyenne and on October 19, 1943, he placed second in the mayoral primary, behind John J. McInerney and ahead of incumbent Mayor Ed Warren. On November 2, he defeated McInerney with 3,079 votes to his 2,775 votes.

On November 30, he announced that he would appoint Jesse B. Ekdall as Cheyenne's chief of police once he took office on January 1, 1944. On January 13, he stated that he was opposed to legalizing gambling when he was asked by James H. Walton and later proposed a $1,000 license fee for the operation of jukebox and pinball machines.

=== Bribery ===
On March 11, 1944, members of Cheyenne's police department solicited a $100 bribe from Lola West, a tavern operator, as protection money and did the same to W. C. Grimes for $25.

Judge Sam M. Thompson issued four arrest warrants for Hanna, Ekdall, Captain Gerald J. Morris, and Sergeant E. K. Violette hours after the affidavits were filed by county attorney Edward Byron Hirst. Hanna was arrested at a city council meeting while Ekdall, Morris, and Violette voluntarily turned themselves in. On March 20, Hanna, Ekdall, Morris, and Violette were charged with soliciting and accepting bribes in Laramie County District court and pled not guilty. Hanna and Ekdall's bail was set at $4,000 and Morris and Violette's bail was set at $3,000. On March 22, Thompson was disqualified from presiding over the bribery trial after the four men filed an affidavit requesting a different judge alleging that Thompson was biased and prejudiced.

The trial started on May 1, with Judge Harry P. Ilsley presiding. The four men were charged with soliciting and accepting bribes from ten people and were defended by former District attorney A. D. Walton and former Wyoming Attorney general James A. Greenwood. L. D. Parker and Fred M. Taylor, two federal investigators that worked in the alcohol tax unit of the Internal Revenue Service, claimed that they witnessed the four men discuss a payment of $100 from West and that Violette had taken the $100 from a table after West had counted the money. Grimes also gave a list of the serial numbers of the bribe money and the serial numbers of three $5 bills in Hanna's possession were found on the list. Hanna claimed that the money taken from West and Grimes were fines for illegal activities and were part of $680 in fines that had been issued.

On May 6, the jury found all four men guilty after three and a half hours of deliberation. Hanna and Ekdall were sentenced to seven to ten years in prison while Violette was sentenced to two to three years and Morris was sentenced to one to two years. Warden A. S. Roach designated the four men as trustees and sent them to work on a farm in Rawlins, Wyoming, but the men later requested to be returned to prison. A false report stated that the men were sent back to prison after engaging in a fist fight.

On March 20, Bruce S. Jones and Gus Fleischli, the remaining members of the city council following Hanna's arrest, voted to make juvenile officer F. B. McVicar the acting chief of police. On May 8, Jones and Fleischli approved a resolution that declared the position of mayor vacant due to Hanna's conviction and appointed Jones as acting mayor.

== Later life ==
Hanna and Ekdall applied for parole consideration at the July 1, 1945, meeting of the Wyoming Board of Parole, but Malcolm LeSueur, the secretary of the board, stated that their requests would not be considered. On October 3, the board granted them parole starting on December 15, and were to be released from parole on December 15, 1946.

On August 7, 1962, Hanna married Neoma Smith in Kilgore, Texas. On April 23, 1974, he died in Eastland Memorial Hospital in Eastland, Texas. In 1978, the Cheyenne City and County Building where he was put on trial, and where Tom Horn was tried in 1903, was nominated as a historic place.

== Electoral history ==
1943 Cheyenne, Wyoming mayoral election
Primary election
Party	Candidate	Votes	%
Nonpartisan	John J. McInerney	1,593	31.73%
Nonpartisan	Ira L. Hanna	1,310	26.09%
Nonpartisan	John W. Howard	1,125	22.41%
Nonpartisan	Ed Warren (incumbent)	993	19.78%
Total votes		5,021	100.00%
General election
Nonpartisan	Ira L. Hanna	3,079	52.60%
Nonpartisan	John J. McInerney	2,775	47.40%
Total votes		5,854	100.00%
