= Moses Patrick Keefe =

American politician

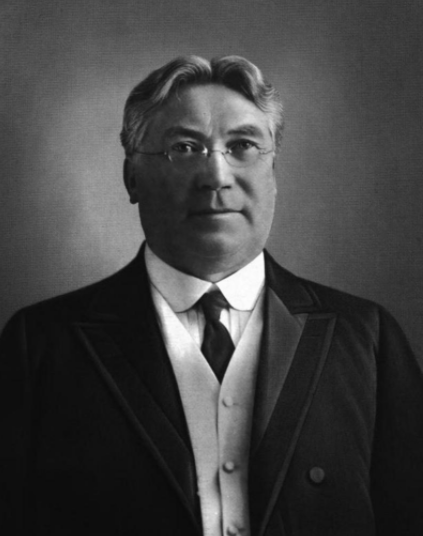

22nd Mayor of Cheyenne, Wyoming
- In office 1903–1904
- Preceded by: J. L. Murray
- Succeeded by: Daniel Webster Gill

Personal details
- Born: September 25, 1853 Ireland, United Kingdom of Great Britain and Ireland
- Died: April 24, 1929 (aged 75)
- Party: Republican
- Spouse(s): Eliza Gaynor Kewley; Elizabeth Tilton
- Children: 7
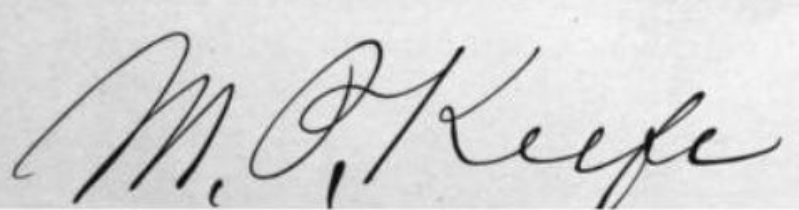
- Signature

Moses Patrick Keefe (September 25, 1853 – April 24, 1929) was an American politician who served as the 22nd Mayor of Cheyenne, Wyoming.

== Early life ==
Moses Patrick Keefe was born on September 25, 1853, to Michael Keefe and Margaret Quinn in Ireland, United Kingdom of Great Britain and Ireland. He attended school until he was thirteen and immigrated to the United States at age seventeen where he lived in Decatur, Illinois. In 1873, he moved to Cheyenne, Wyoming Territory, but returned to Illinois in 1874. He moved back to the Wyoming Territory in 1876.

During his time in Wyoming he supervised the construction of Fort D. A. Russell, the main portion of the Wyoming State Capitol building, and most of Cheyenne's public schools. He also supervised the construction of Fort Crook, Fort Omaha, and Fort Robinson. In 1899, he supervised the remolding of buildings in Cuba with General John R. Brooke.

In October 1877, he married Eliza Gaynor Kewley, with whom he would have seven children with before her death in March 1895. In 1902, he married Elizabeth Tilton.

== Career ==
In 1886, Keefe was elected to the ninth session of the territorial legislature as a member of the Republican Party. Keefe also served as a county commissioner and member of the Cheyenne city council. He served as the mayor of Mayor of Cheyenne, Wyoming from 1902 to 1903. In 1918, he was appointed to serve as a member of the Proposed Construction of the Wyoming State Council of Defense.

== Death ==
Keefe died on March 14, 1929, after suffering a heart attack and influenza. His funeral was held in Cheyenne, Wyoming, on March 16.
