= Ed Warren (politician) =

American actor and politician from Wyoming

Member of the Wyoming Senate
- In office January 25, 1952 – January 1, 1953
- Preceded by: George E. Lindell

35th and 41st Mayor of Cheyenne, Wyoming
- In office January 1, 1940 – January 1, 1944
- Preceded by: Archie Allison
- Succeeded by: Ira L. Hanna
- In office June 21, 1951 – January 7, 1952
- Preceded by: Edward Gowdy
- Succeeded by: R. E. Cheever

Member of the Cheyenne, Wyoming city council
- In office 1934 – January 1, 1940

Personal details
- Born: Ed Warren Leisenring c.1886–1887
- Died: April 15, 1963
- Party: Democratic

Ed Warren, born Ed Warren Leisenring, (c. 1886/1887 – April 15, 1963) was an American actor and politician who served as the 35th and 41st Mayor of Cheyenne, Wyoming.

== Early life ==
Ed Warren Leisenring was born around 1886 or 1887. He became an actor as a child with his two sisters after being introduced by Fred Stone. He later adopted the stage name of Ed Warren as he felt that his last name "Leisenring" was too complicated. His career as an actor ended shortly after 1915 as by that time both of his sisters had left due to getting married. During his career he played on Broadway and would later become the third mayor of Cheyenne, Wyoming to have done so.

== Career ==
=== City council ===
In 1933, he placed fourth out of sixteen candidates, behind Arthur B. Henderson, Arthur W. Trout, and E. J. Smalley, in the Cheyenne city council primary. In the general election he and Trout defeated Henderson and Smalley. Warren and Trout were reelected in 1935 and 1937.

On June 18, 1938, he offered a $25 reward for information leading to the arrest of vandals who attempted to blow up a wooden building in Kiwanis Beach park using a powder keg with a fifty-foot fuse.

=== Mayor ===
In 1939, he ran in the Cheyenne mayoral primary and placed in the top two alongside John J. McInerney ahead of nine other candidates. In the general election he easily defeated McInerney. In 1941, he won reelection against McInerney. On August 12, 1943, he announced that he would seek reelection, but placed last in the mayoral primary.

On March 1, 1951, Mayor Benjamin Nelson resigned from office after he was called to active duty in the air force. Edward Gowdy took over as acting mayor and he and A. W. Trout selected Warren to serve out the remainder of Nelson's term. On June 21, Warren was sworn in as mayor.

Warren announced that he would seek election to a term in his own right and placed first out of ten candidates in the mayoral primary. However, in the general election he was defeated by R. E. Cheever.

== Later life ==
In 1952, state Senator George E. Lindell resigned to become an instructor at Francis E. Warren Air Force Base. Warren, Art Buck, and Raymond Morris were nominated by the Laramie County Democratic Central Committee. Warren was selected on January 25, and served until the term expired on January 1, 1953.

On September 15, 1953, he announced that he would run in Cheyenne's mayoral primary. However, he came behind incumbent Mayor Cheever and Val S. Christensen.

In October 1955, he announced that he would run in Cheyenne's mayoral primary against incumbent Mayor Christensen and former Mayor Cheever. In the primary he placed third and endorsed Cheever for the general election. In the general election Christensen defeated Cheever.

On April 14, 1963, Warren asked Ed Piva to dig a hole in his yard so that a tree could be planted. On April 15, he killed himself and his dog through inhaling carbon monoxide from his car exhaust. He left a letter asking for his dog to be buried in the hole dug by Piva.

== Electoral history ==
Ed Warren electoral history

1939 Cheyenne, Wyoming mayoral election
Party	Candidate	Votes	%
Nonpartisan	Ed Warren	5,272	64.57%
Nonpartisan	John J. McInerney	2,893	35.43%
Total votes		8,165	100.00%

1943 Cheyenne, Wyoming mayoral primary
Party	Candidate	Votes	%
Nonpartisan	John J. McInerney	1,593	31.73%
Nonpartisan	Ira L. Hanna	1,310	26.09%
Nonpartisan	John W. Howard	1,125	22.41%
Nonpartisan	Ed Warren (incumbent)	993	19.78%
Total votes		5,021	100.00%

1951 Cheyenne, Wyoming mayoral election
Primary election
Party	Candidate	Votes	%
Nonpartisan	Ed Warren (incumbent)	2,938	36.36%
Nonpartisan	R. E. Cheever	2,059	25.48%
Nonpartisan	Lou Mankus	986	12.20%
Nonpartisan	D. N. Packwood	546	6.76%
Nonpartisan	Walter Schoenberg	429	5.31%
Nonpartisan	Harvey Roach	356	4.41%
Nonpartisan	Fred Kaysbier Jr.	297	3.68%
Nonpartisan	M. J. Andrews	247	3.06%
Nonpartisan	Don J. Elliott	137	1.70%
Nonpartisan	Kenneth Franson	85	1.05%
Total votes		8,080	100.00%
General election
Nonpartisan	R. E. Cheever	4,419	52.29%
Nonpartisan	Ed Warren (incumbent)	4,032	47.71%
Total votes		8,451	100.00%

1955 Cheyenne, Wyoming mayoral primary
Party	Candidate	Votes	%
Nonpartisan	Val S. Christensen (incumbent)	4,375	45.87%
Nonpartisan	R. E. Cheever	4,027	42.23%
Nonpartisan	Ed Warren	1,135	11.90%
Total votes		9,537	100.00%
