= H. M. Hook =

American politician (c.1830/31–1868)

1st Mayor of Cheyenne
- In office August 10, 1867 – January 30, 1868
- Preceded by: Office established
- Succeeded by: Luke Murrin

Personal details
- Born: Hiram M. Hook c. 1830–1831 Pennsylvania, U.S.
- Died: 1868 Green River, Dakota/Wyoming Territory, U.S.

Hiram M. Hook (c. 1830/1831 – 1868) was an American politician who served as the first Mayor of Cheyenne, Wyoming, while it was still a part of the Dakota Territory with a population of around 600 people.

== Career ==
Hiram M. Hook was born around 1831, in Pennsylvania. Hook served as the stage station manager in Dogtown, Nebraska, nine miles east of Fort Kearny.

From 1864 to 1865, Hook and James Moore pastured cattle in a glade north of Pleasant Valley in Larimer County, Colorado Territory; the area would be later named the Hook & Moore Canyon. During this time he operated a store in Laporte with a man named French.

In 1867, he moved his cattle to Cheyenne, Dakota Territory. In Cheyenne he operated a general store called the Great Western Corral.

== Mayor ==
On August 7, 1867, a meeting was organized in Cheyenne for the purpose of creating a provisional municipal government. On August 9, Ed Brown, who served as the chairman of the meeting, was nominated for the town's mayoralty while another group nominated Hook. On August 10, Hook defeated Brown by five votes and the slate of Hook candidates defeated all of the Brown candidates except for E. Melanger, who was elected as city marshal. Hook served as mayor until January 30, 1868.

== Death ==
Hook, Jesse Ewing, and several other silver prospectors traveled on the Green River in three boats during the summer of 1868. While navigating the river, his raft overturned due to a whirlpool and he drowned. His widow offered a $1,000 reward for the location of Hook's burial site, but it resulted in multiple false grave sites.
