= M. V. Boughton =

American pioneer and politician

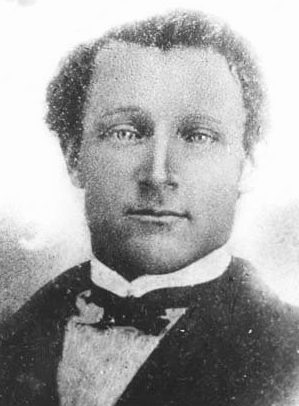

7th Mayor of Cheyenne, Wyoming
- In office 1873–1874
- Preceded by: M. Sloan
- Succeeded by: George Cassels

President of the Laramie County Stock Association
- In office 1874–1876
- Preceded by: position established
- Succeeded by: Alexander Hamilton Swan

Personal details
- Born: Martin Van Buren Boughton c. 1831
- Died: January 7–16, 1916 Meade County, South Dakota, U.S.
- Spouse: Mary E. Boughton

Martin Van Buren Boughton, more commonly referred to as M. V. Boughton, (c. 1831 – January 7–16, 1916) was an American pioneer and politician who served as the 7th Mayor of Cheyenne, Wyoming.

== Early life ==
Martin Van Buren Boughton was born around 1831. During the 1860s he served as the county clerk for Weld County in the Colorado Territory. Boughton was one of the first settlers in Deadwood, Dakota Territory after having lived in Denver, Colorado.

== Career ==
From 1873 to 1874, he served as the 7th Mayor of Cheyenne, Wyoming.

On November 29, 1873, the first meeting of the Laramie County Stock Association (which later became the Wyoming Stock Growers Association) was held and Boughton was selected to serve as chairman of the meeting. At the second meeting, held on February 23 and 24, 1874, he was among the 25 men who agreed to become members of the organization. During this time he served as the first president of the association.

From 1876 to 1877, Boughton lead 1,056 cattle, worth $65,000, and 105 horses, worth $15,000, from Cheyenne, Wyoming to Deadwood, South Dakota. However, in July, 1876, members of the Sioux tribe attacked his herd and launched another attack in March, 1877. In 1900, he attempted to receive compensation for the loss cattle and horses, but the United States Court of Claims needed proof of whether or not the Sioux were at war with the United States at the time of the attacks. In 1905, he filed another claim for $80,000 and although the Court of Claims ruled that the cattle killed in 1876 could not be compensated for as the United States was at war with the Sioux it also ruled that the 1877 killing could be compensated as there was no active war between the United States and Sioux and awarded him $12,000.

On November 28, 1880, he and his wife, Mary E. Boughton, divorced.

By 1900, he was a committeeman in the Montana Democratic Party. He served as a delegate to the Cascade County Democratic convention and was selected as a delegate to the state convention in 1896 and 1900. During the 1896 elections he served as an election judge alongside Henry Parrent and J. T. Eaton. During the 1900 and 1902 elections he served as an election judge at a polling place alongside W. F. Junkins and Hans Olson. During the 1901 elections he served as an election judge alongside Ira Hickory and J. P. Lewis.

== Later life ==
During the summer of 1915, he worked at the Belle Fourche Experiment Farm and received injuries that he would not recover from after being kicked by a horse. In the fall, he created a claim in Meade County, South Dakota and began living in it in December. Boughton died between January 9 to 14, 1916, on his homestead.
