= Bill Nation =

American politician (1925–2022)

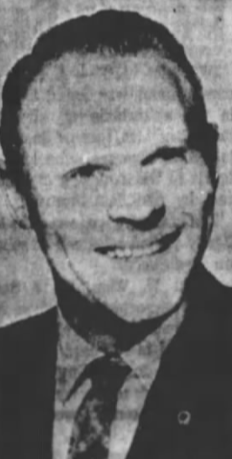

45th and 50th Mayor of Cheyenne, Wyoming
- In office January 2, 1962 – 1966
- Preceded by: Worth Story
- Succeeded by: Bill Herbert Kingham
- In office January 2, 1973 – January 3, 1977
- Preceded by: James D. Van Velzor
- Succeeded by: Donald Erickson

Member of the Wyoming House of Representatives from Laramie County
- In office 1965–1967

Personal details
- Born: May 28, 1925 Lingle, Wyoming
- Died: April 13, 2022 (aged 96) Cheyenne, Wyoming
- Party: Democratic Party
- Spouse: Jo Ann Petersen
- Children: 4

Charles William Nation (May 28, 1925 – April 13, 2022), better known as Bill Nation, was an American politician who served as the 45th and 50th Mayor of Cheyenne, Wyoming, and in the Wyoming House of Representatives as a member of the Democratic Party. He unsuccessfully sought the Democratic gubernatorial nomination in 1966 and election as Laramie County Clerk in 1970.

== Early life ==
Charles William Nation was born in Lingle, Wyoming on May 28, 1925. During World War II he served as a gunner aboard a destroyer, the USS Schroeder (DD-501), a Fletcher-class destroyer, this was a ship of the United States Navy, named for Rear Admiral Seaton Schroeder. Entering service in 1943 under Admiral William Halsey Jr.'s command. Bill Nation married Jo Ann Petersen, with whom he had four children.

== Career ==
=== Mayor ===
==== Elections ====
Prior to entering politics Nation was a professional photographer. In September 1959, Nation announced that he would run for the mayoralty of Cheyenne, Wyoming and was the first person to do so. However, incumbent Mayor Worth Story and state senator R. J. Keelan were the finalists in the primary and Story would later defeat Keelan in the general election.

In 1961, Nation ran for mayor of Cheyenne, placed first in the primary ahead of incumbent Mayor Story, and defeated Story in the general election. On September 30, 1963, Nation filed to run for reelection, placed first in the primary, and won in the general election. Nation announced that he would not seek reelection in 1965, and was succeeded by Bill Herbert Kingham.

Nation announced that he would seek election to the mayoral office on September 12, 1967, but placed third in the primary behind former Mayor R. E. Cheever and state legislator George R. Cox. On October 6, 1969, Nation filed to run in the mayoral election, but was defeated in the general election by incumbent Mayor Floyd Holland.

In 1972, Nation defeated incumbent Mayor James Van Velzor by five votes in the mayoral election, which was the smallest margin of victory for any Cheyenne mayor.

Nation announced at a press conference on July 21, 1976, that he would seek reelection. During the general election campaign he spent $936 against Don Erickson's, who was endorsed by the Cheyenne Central Labor council despite being a Republican, $988.42. In the general election Nation was defeated by Erickson.

In 1980, Nation ran for the mayoral office, placed second in the primary, but lost to incumbent Mayor Erickson in the general election.

==== Tenure ====
In 1962, Nation was elected to the board of directors of the Wyoming Association of Municipalities alongside other mayors and local officials in Wyoming. In 1963, he was selected to serve as vice-president of the organization.

After the assassination of John F. Kennedy Nation proposed naming Cheyenne's airport after Kennedy in December 1963, but later chose to not introduce the proposal. In 1974, Nation rejected an attempt by the American Nazi Party to establish a national headquarters in Cheyenne and called for other residents of Cheyenne to write to the American Nazi Party to express their views on the proposal.

In 1973, the Model Cities Program in Cheyenne had charges of discrimination filed against it by the Cheyenne Local Development Corporation due to its budget being decreased and had been investigated by the United States Department of Housing and Urban Development. Nation and Gerald Iverson, the director of the Model Cities Program, denied that there was discrimination, but the city was found guilty of discrimination on June 11.

=== Other political offices ===
In 1964, Nation was elected to the Wyoming House of Representatives as one of eleven members from Laramie County as a member of the Democratic Party. In 1965, he was appointed to serve on the Revenue, City and County Affairs, and Welfare, Buildings, Institutions, Sanitary and Medical Affairs committees. On March 9, 1967, Governor Stanley K. Hathaway appointed Bill Nation as one of nine members of the Wyoming Recreation Committee.

On March 8, 1966, Nation announced that he would seek the Democratic gubernatorial nomination. On May 10, he selected Kermit D. Glover, who had served as Nation's campaign manager for his mayoral and state legislature campaigns, as his gubernatorial campaign manager. In the Democratic primary he was defeated by Ernest Wilkerson.

On July 7, 1970, Nation filed to run for Laramie County Clerk and won the Democratic nomination, but lost in the general election against incumbent Republican clerk John B. Huisman.

== Death ==
Nation died in Cheyenne on April 13, 2022, at the age of 96.

== Electoral history ==
Bill Nation electoral history

1961 Cheyenne, Wyoming mayoral primary
Primary election
Party	Candidate	Votes	%
Nonpartisan	Bill Nation	3,491	46.40%
Nonpartisan	Worth Story (incumbent)	3,160	42.00%
Nonpartisan	Homer J. McAuliffe	873	11.60%
Total votes		7,524	100.00%
General election
Nonpartisan	Bill Nation	6,507	58.62%
Nonpartisan	Worth Story (incumbent)	4,594	41.38%
Total votes		11,101	100.00%

1963 Cheyenne, Wyoming mayoral election
Party	Candidate	Votes	%
Nonpartisan	Bill Nation (incumbent)	6,544	60.17%
Nonpartisan	O. N. Buckles	4,331	39.83%
Total votes		10,875	100.00%

1966 Wyoming Gubernatorial Democratic primary
Party	Candidate	Votes	%
Democratic	Ernest Wilkerson	13,145	31.07%
Democratic	Bill Nation	9,834	23.25%
Democratic	Jack R. Gage	8,661	20.47%
Democratic	Raymond B. Whitaker	6,238	14.75%
Democratic	Howard L. Burke	4,426	10.46%
Total votes		42,304	100.00%

1967 Cheyenne, Wyoming mayoral primary
Party	Candidate	Votes	%
Nonpartisan	R. E. Cheever	2,996	31.69%
Nonpartisan	George R. Cox	2,341	24.76%
Nonpartisan	Bill Nation	2,089	22.10%
Nonpartisan	Jim Van Velzor	1,264	13.37%
Nonpartisan	Henry Jensen	676	7.15%
Nonpartisan	Ray Gawryluk	88	0.93%
Total votes		9,454	100.00%

1969 Cheyenne, Wyoming mayoral election
Party	Candidate	Votes	%
Nonpartisan	Floyd Holland (incumbent)	5,028	61.13%
Nonpartisan	Bill Nation	3,197	38.87%
Total votes		8,225	100.00%

1970 Laramie County Clerk election
Primary election
Party	Candidate	Votes	%
Democratic	Bill Nation	5,530	100.00%
Total votes		5,530	100.00%
General election
Republican	John B. Huisman (incumbent)	9,755	51.50%
Democratic	Bill Nation	9,187	48.50%
Total votes		18,942	100.00%

1976 Cheyenne, Wyoming mayoral election
Party	Candidate	Votes	%
Nonpartisan	Don Erickson	11,389	56.93%
Nonpartisan	Bill Nation (incumbent)	8,616	43.07%
Total votes		20,005	100.00%

1980 Cheyenne, Wyoming mayoral election
Primary election
Party	Candidate	Votes	%
Nonpartisan	Don Erickson (incumbent)	4,338	30.92%
Nonpartisan	Bill Nation	3,439	24.51%
Nonpartisan	John Rogers	3,375	24.05%
Nonpartisan	Mike Sullivan	2,629	18.74%
Nonpartisan	Carl Johnson	251	1.79%
Total votes		14,032	100.00%
General election
Nonpartisan	Don Erickson (incumbent)	11,751	57.54%
Nonpartisan	Bill Nation	8,671	42.46%
Total votes		20,422	100.00%
