= John Clay (cattleman) =

Scottish-born American stockman (1851–1934)

Clay, photographed circa 1910

John Clay (1851–March 17, 1934) was a noted Scottish-born American stockman (cattleman) and financier. Dubbed the "dean of American stockmen", he worked in the American livestock industry for more than sixty years. Clay founded operated the John Clay Livestock Commission, which was one of the United States' largest commission firms. He also founded and operated a vast moneylending operation including nearly 25 banks. He managed several ranch companies, including the Swan Land and Cattle Company. He was president of the Wyoming Stock Growers Association in the 1890s. He was the founder and president of the International Livestock Association (which ran the annual Chicago International Livestock show).

== Early life ==
study of a portrait of Clay's father, the original of which Clay had gifted to his father

1858 painting of a young Clay (left) with two of his namesakes (his father and grandfather), posed before a hanging portrait of a third namesake (his great-grandfather)

Clay was born circa 1851 in Winfield, Berwick, in the Scottish Borders region of Scotland. Clay was the namesake son of a tenant farmer of Kerchesters, a vast farm along River Tweed. Clay's father (d. 1904), grandfather (1824–1866), and great-grandfather (b. 1787) all were also named "John Clay".

Clay spent his childhood and early adulthood on the farm his father was a tenant of.

== Career ==
Dubbed the "dean of American stockmen" in his later years, Clay worked in the American livestock industry for more than sixty years. Clay's work in ranch operations included operations in the American states and territories of Wyoming, Kansas, Texas, and California. In his life, Clay was a well-known figure across the Western United States. He was described as "a national figure in market activities".

=== Early career ===
Clay entered the livestock industry in the 1870s. He was soon employed by Scottish and English investors to purchase and oversee land and cattle investments in North America, work which brought him to the United States, Clay traveled to the United States for his work in the United States in 1874. In the 1870s, Clay resided for some time in Cheyenne, Wyoming. In 1879 he traveled to Canada to manage to Canada West Farm Stock Association. That same year, he also again visited the United States. He returned to the United States again in 1882 in order to inspect land holdings. This included his first-ever visit to the state of Montana, which he visited as a guest in the company of Northern Pacific Railway stockholder Rufus Hatch (who brought him up to Glendive aboard his private railroad car).

Clay's initial work in North America also included managing herds and ranches in the Western United States, and studying the problems encountered by American stockmen.

In 1883, Clay relocated permanently from Canada to the United States, opening an office in Chicago, Illinois on May 1 of that year.

=== Moneylending ===
In 1883, Clay entered the moneylending business in earnest, giving loans to ranchmen. Moneylending quickly developed into a major business venture for Clay. By 1890, he was financing loans for Scottish investors. In 1892, he began to purchase bank stocks.

Clay would ultimately run a private lending operation, the John Clay Company that controlled a network of nearly 25 banks. The extent of his network of financial institutions was vast, though a precise size is indeterminable due to a lack of surviving records. The John Clay Company located its offices in the Rookery Building in Chicago.

=== Livestock commission firm ===
Clay, circa 1906

In 1886, at the Union Stock Yards in Chicago, Clay opened the first office of his commission firm, Clay–Robinson. The firm was later renamed John Clay & Company, and even later was renamed the John Clay Livestock Commission. Clay remained head of the firm until his death. The Chicago-headquartered company opened branches in eight cities housing major stockyards in the Western United States, including Denver, Colorado; Kansas City, Missouri; Omaha, Nebraska; Sioux City Iowa; South St. Paul, Minnesota; and other locations. The firm was among the largest livestock commission firms in the United States. In one obituary for Clay, a Montana newspaper remarked, "nearly every stockman in the [American] Northwest has at some time shipped their livestock to Clay['s firm].

Clay's roles included acting as a livestock broker.

=== Management of ranch operations ===
Clay managed a number of major ranches in the Western United States.

In 1888, after Alexander Hamilton Swan was fired by his company's board of directors following significant financial losses due to failed land speculation and sizable winter cattle losses, Clay replaced him as the president of the Wyoming-based Swan Land and Cattle Company. He would continue heading the management of the company for years thereafter. Clay shifted the company, which had been one of the largest cattle ventures in the United States, to turn its focus to sheep. Other companies which Clay managed included Cattle Ranche, Wyoming Cattle Ranche, and Western Ranches.

Considered a prominent businessman in Wyoming, in 1890 he was elected president of the Wyoming Stock Growers Association, a position he held for six years thereafter.

In Wyoming, he was connected with a number of actors who took violent action to combat cattle rustlers (thieves). He was suspected of playing a major role in the scheme behind the 1891 Johnson County Invasion. He denied this, saying that, in 1891, he advised Frank Wolcott against the scheme and was out of the country when it was undertaken. However, he later helped the participants in the invasion avoid punishment after their surrender. Historians are skeptical against Clay's denial of involvement. In 1892, Clay hired Tom Horn to serve as a stock detective, at face-value being tasked with apprehending cattle rustlers. Horn effectively acted as a hired killer and gunman, however. Additionally, the lynchers of Ellen Watson ("Cattle Kate") and Jim Averell were individuals that were in the employ of Clay and associates of Clay.

=== International Livestock Exposition ===
Clay founded the International Livestock Association, which operated the annual International Livestock Exposition in Chicago. From 1923 until retiring in 1933, he served as its president After he retired, Henry W. Marshall was selected as his successor. Clay continued to hold a directorship in the association until his death the following year.

== Writing and publishing ==
Clay was also an extensive publisher and author of written works. He wrote prolifically. Clay's work included extensive autobiography, and compiling of his own family history.

== Personal life and death ==
In 1888, Clay became a naturalized citizen of the United States. Clay resided in Chicago.

Swan's eldest son was a namesake son also named John Clay, who succeeded Clay as head of his the Chicago-based livestock commission. His second-eldest son was Charles Clay, who was a partner of the Quaker Oats Company. His third, and youngest, son was Alexander Thomson Clay, of the firm of the firm Pringle & Clay, W.S., Edinburgh.

Swan's second marriage was to the former Stella Rintoul.

Clay's hobbies included fox hunting on trips to his native Scotland and nearby Northumberland, England. In June 1910, it was announced that Clay would be the "master of hounds" for the next winter hunt in Northumberland. Clay often rode a horse named "Chicago" on his hunts. He continued to hunt until vision loss forced him to abandon the hobby.

Clay died of heart disease, passing at his house in Chicago on March 17, 1934, at the age of 82. He was survived by second wife. His funeral service was held at Chicago's St. Paul's Episcopal Church, while his burial was in the Canadian city of Woodstock, Ontario on March 20, 1934. On March 20, the livestock markets in the nine cities housing offices of his commission firm ceased all business activities for fifteen minutes in order to memorialize Clay, timed to coincide with the moment of Clay's burial.

In 1961, Clay was posthumously inducted into the Hall of Great Westerners.
