= 193rd Ohio Infantry Regiment =

- Active: March 1865 to August 4, 1865
- Country: United States
- Allegiance: Union
- Branch: Infantry

The 193rd Ohio Infantry Regiment, sometimes 193rd Ohio Volunteer Infantry (or 193rd OVI) was an infantry regiment in the Union Army during the American Civil War.

== Service ==
The 193rd Ohio Infantry was organized at Camp Chase in Columbus, Ohio in March, 1865, and mustered in for one year service under the command of Colonel Eugene Powell.

The regiment was ordered to Harpers Ferry, West Virginia, and assigned to 2nd Brigade, 1st Provisional Division, Army of the Shenandoah, March 20. Marched to Charleston March 21, and duty there until April 4. Transferred to 2nd Brigade, 2nd Provisional Division, March 27. Moved to Winchester April 4, and duty there until August 1865.

The 193rd Ohio Infantry mustered out of service August 4, 1865, at Winchester, Virginia.

== Casualties ==
The regiment lost a total of 29 enlisted men during service, all due to disease.

== Commanders ==
- Colonel Eugene Powell

== See also ==
- List of Ohio Civil War units
- Ohio in the Civil War
