= Bruce S. Jones =

American politician (1883–1981)

Member of the Wyoming House of Representatives from Laramie
- In office 1947–1951

37th Mayor of Cheyenne, Wyoming
- In office May 8, 1944 – 1946
- Preceded by: Ira L. Hanna
- Succeeded by: John J. McInerney

Member of the Cheyenne, Wyoming City Council
- In office 1944 – September 1944
- Preceded by: Al Kay; J.A. Buchanan
- Succeeded by: George L. Kemp

Personal details
- Born: February 12, 1883 Laramie, Wyoming, United States
- Died: August 19, 1981 (aged 98)
- Party: Republican
- Spouse: Vera G. Gilland

Military service
- Allegiance: United States
- Branch/service: United States Army

Bruce S. Jones (February 12, 1883 – August 19, 1981) was an American politician who served as the 37th Mayor of Cheyenne, Wyoming.

== Early life ==
Bruce S. Jones was born in 1883, in Laramie, Wyoming. During World War I he enlisted into the United States Army and served at the Presidio in San Francisco, California. However, due to health problems he was not able to serve overseas.

== Career ==
On October 19, 1943, he, Al Kay, Gus Fleischli, and J.A. Buchanan received the four highest number of votes out of nine candidates in the city council primary. On November 2, he and Fleischli defeated Kay and Buchanan, who were the incumbents.

=== Mayor ===
On March 20, 1944, Mayor Ira L. Hanna was arrested at a city council meeting and Chief of Police Jesse B. Ekdall, Captain Gerald J. Morris, and Sergeant E. K. Violette later voluntarily turned themselves in. Jones and Gus Fleischli, the remaining members of the city council following Hanna's arrest, voted to make juvenile officer F. B. McVicar the acting chief of police. After all four men were convicted on charges of soliciting and accepting bribes Jones and Fleischli approved a resolution that declared the position of mayor vacant due to Hanna's conviction and appointed Jones as acting mayor on May 8.

On May 17, 1944, Jones appointed McVicar to serve as chief of police to serve the remainder of Ekdall's two year term. In September, he resigned from his position on the city council and officially became mayor. George L. Kemp was appointed to replace Jones on the city council and as commissioner of finance.

On October 9, 1945, he announced that he would not run in the mayoral primary election.

=== State legislature ===
Jones served in the Wyoming House of Representatives before his election to Cheyenne's city council and announced on June 7, 1946, that he would seek the Republican nomination to run for the state House of Representatives. He won the Republican nomination and was elected in the general election.

He was appointed to serve on the Memorials and federal relations and the Corporations and public utilities committees during the 1947-1949 legislative session. In 1950, he was selected to serve as the serjeant-at-arms.

In 1947, he announced that he would run in the Cheyenne mayoral primary, but placed third behind John J. Mcinerney and Benjamin C. Nelson. In 1949, he ran in the mayoral primary again, but came in third place behind incumbent Mayor Benjamin Nelson and R. J. Keelan.

In 1950, he and Howard L. Burke were given the Republican nomination to run for Senate from Laramie County.

== Electoral history ==
1947 Cheyenne, Wyoming mayoral primary
Party	Candidate	Votes	%
Nonpartisan	John J. McInerney (incumbent)	2,325	41.8%
Nonpartisan	Benjamin Nelson	2,277	40.9%
Nonpartisan	Bruce S. Jones	960	17.3%
Total votes		5,562	100%

1949 Cheyenne, Wyoming mayoral primary
Party	Candidate	Votes	%
Nonpartisan	Benjamin Nelson (incumbent)	3,975	55.6%
Nonpartisan	R. J. Keelan	1,070	15.0%
Nonpartisan	Bob Cox	837	11.7%
Nonpartisan	Bruce S. Jones	764	10.7%
Nonpartisan	Harvey Roach	442	6.2%
Nonpartisan	Don Johnson	56	0.8%
Total votes		7,144	100%
