= Leo Pando =

American politician

53rd Mayor of Cheyenne, Wyoming
- In office 1993–2001
- Preceded by: Gary Schaeffer
- Succeeded by: Jack R. Spiker

Member of the Cheyenne, Wyoming city council from Ward 2
- In office 1989–1993

Personal details
- Died: March 30, 2023

Leo Pando (died March 30, 2023) was an American politician who was active in local politics in Cheyenne, Wyoming. He served in the Cheyenne city council and as the 53rd Mayor of Cheyenne, Wyoming.

== Early life ==
Leo Pando was one of eleven children. He was a member of the Cheyenne sanitation crew while in high school. In 1985, a hail storm and flash flooding killed twelve people in Cheynne, including Pando's daughter.

== Career ==
Pando served as a police detective in the Cheyenne, Wyoming police department. In 1988, Pando was elected to the city council in Cheyenne from Ward 2 alongside Joseph C. Dougherty. Pando was selected to serve as the vice-president of the city council.

In 1992, Pando ran in Cheyenne's mayoral election against incumbent Mayor Gary Schaeffer. He placed second in the primary behind Schaeffer and defeated Schaeffer in the general election. Pando ran for reelection in 1996, placed first out of eight candidates in the primary, and defeated Rod Miller in the general election.

Pando ran for reelection in 2000, placed first in the primary, but was defeated in the general election by Jack Spiker. Pando had spent $20,386 against Spiker's $13,449, and he had outraised Spiker.

Pando appointed Mark Moran to replace Bernard Pitts, who had served since March 1986, as municipal court judge starting on July 1. 1999, and Moran served until 2019. In 2000, Pando successfully requested the resignation of Frederika Barlea, the Cheyenne city treasurer, after Barela admitted to knowing about up to $600,000 in unreconciled bank statements and not sending the statements to Pando. The city's general fund had more than $11 million at the end of Pando's term.

== Death ==
Pando died on March 30, 2023.

== Electoral history ==
1988 Cheyenne, Wyoming city council Ward 2 election
Party	Candidate	Votes	%
Nonpartisan	Joseph C. Doughterty	4,801	32.07%
Nonpartisan	Leo Pando	4,268	28.51%
Nonpartisan	Virgil Slough	3,728	24.90%
Nonpartisan	Billie Ruth Edwards	2,173	14.52%
Total votes		14,970	100.00%

1992 Cheyenne, Wyoming mayoral election
Primary election
Party	Candidate	Votes	%
Nonpartisan	Gary Schaeffer (incumbent)	6,168	39.06%
Nonpartisan	Leo Pando	5,574	35.29%
Nonpartisan	Diana Oliger	3,454	21.87%
Nonpartisan	Frank Slurff	597	3.78%
Total votes		15,793	100.00%
General election
Nonpartisan	Leo Pando	11,594	50.79%
Nonpartisan	Gary Schaeffer (incumbent)	11,232	49.21%
Total votes		22,826	100.00%

1996 Cheyenne, Wyoming mayoral election
Party	Candidate	Votes	%
Nonpartisan	Leo Pando (incumbent)	11,979	50.99%
Nonpartisan	Gary Schaeffer	11,515	49.01%
Total votes		23,494	100.00%

2000 Cheyenne, Wyoming mayoral election
Primary election
Party	Candidate	Votes	%
Nonpartisan	Leo Pando (incumbent)	4,879	42.46%
Nonpartisan	Jack Spiker	3,448	30.01%
Nonpartisan	Scott Roybal	1,958	17.04%
Nonpartisan	Dennis Rafferty	1,206	10.50%
Total votes		11,491	100.00%
General election
Nonpartisan	Jack Spiker	13,461	56.16%
Nonpartisan	Leo Pando (incumbent)	10,403	43.39%
Write-in		110	0.46%
Total votes		23,974	100.00%
