= John Clay Livestock Commission =

Defunct American meat packing company

- Formerly: Clay–Robinson, John Clay & Company
- Company type: Privately held company
- Industry: Meatpacking
- Founded: 1886
- Founder: John Clay (cattleman)
- Defunct: 1960s
- Fate: Closure with decline of stock yards
- Headquarters: Chicago, Illinois, United States
- Area served: United States
- Products: Stock yards

The John Clay Livestock Commission was a livestock commission firm headquartered at the Union Stock Yards in Chicago, Illinois. It had branches at eight cities with major stockyards in the Western United States. If was founded by John Clay, a Scottish-born American cattleman and financier.

== History ==
In 1886, at the Union Stock Yards in Chicago, Illinois, John Clay opened the first office of the firm, Clay–Robinson. The firm was later renamed John Clay & Company, and even later was renamed the John Clay Livestock Commission. Clay remained head of the firm until his death, after which time his namesake son took over management of the firm.

The Chicago-headquartered company opened branches in eight cities housing major stockyards in the Western United States, including Denver, Colorado; Kansas City, Missouri; Omaha, Nebraska; Sioux City, Iowa; South St. Paul, Minnesota; and other locations.

The Kansas City branch, at the Kansas City Stockyards, opened in 1894.

The firm was among the largest (if not outright the absolute largest) livestock commission firms in the United States. In 1932, one Montana newspaper described the company as the "largest old line, independent commission house in the country". In 1934, another Montana newspaper noted, "nearly every stockman in the [American] Northwest has at some time shipped their livestock to John Clay".
