= Bruce D. Jones =

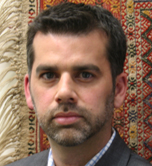
Bruce Jones

Bruce D. Jones (born 1969) is an American academic, an author and policy analyst. He is the Director of the Foreign Policy program and Director of the Project on International Order and Strategy at the Brookings Institution. He is also a consulting professor at the Freeman Spogli Institute at Stanford University and chair of the advisory council of the Center on International Cooperation at New York University.

Through CIC, Jones has authored several policy reports and publications. The Annual Review of Global Peace Operations has rapidly become the reference text for data and analysis on peacekeeping. From Fragility to Resilience has provided new international definitions for resilience and statebuilding, which were adopted by OECD member states, and taken forward by the United Kingdom Department for International Development and others.

Jones's book Power and Responsibility (2009), co-authored by Ambassador Carlos Pascual and Professor Stephen Stedman, received the BookNote Awards Gold Prize in 2009 for Best Book of the Year in the domain of Political Science. Jones is a board member of the Center on Global Counterterrorism Cooperation.

== Education ==
Born in 1969, Jones entered the London School of Economics and Political Science (LSE) in 1991, earning his PhD in 2000 from the Department of International Relations. In 1997–1998, during which time he was registered part-time at LSE, he attended Stanford University as a David Hamburg Fellow on Conflict Prevention at the Stanford University Center for International Security and Cooperation.

== Career ==
Jones joined CIC in 2002 as deputy director. From 2004 to 2005, he served as senior advisor in the office of the UN secretary-general during the UN reform effort leading up to the 2005 World Summit, and in the same period was acting secretary of the secretary-general's Policy Committee.

== Selected publications ==
=== Books ===
- Jones, Bruce D. (2014). Still Ours to Lead: America, Rising Powers, and the Tension between Rivalry and Restraint. Brookings Institution Press. ISBN 978-0-8157-2512-1.
- Jones, Bruce D.; Carlos Pascual; Stephen John Stedman (2009). Power & Responsibility: Building International Order in an Era of Transnational Threats. Brookings Institution Press. ISBN 978-0-8157-4706-2.
- Jones, Bruce D.; Shepard Forman; Richard Gowan (30 November 2009). Cooperating for Peace and Security: Evolving Institutions and Arrangements in a Context of Changing U.S. Security Policy. Cambridge University Press. ISBN 978-0-521-88947-6.

=== Articles ===
- Jones, Bruce (July 2011). "Libya and the Responsibilities of Power". Survival. 53 (3): 51–60. doi:10.1080/00396338.2011.586188. S2CID 154220417. Archived from the original on 15 August 2011.
- Jones, Bruce (March 2011), Largest Minority Shareholder in Global Order LLC: The Changing Balance of Influence and U.S. Strategy (PDF), Washington, D.C.: Brookings Institution
- Jones, Bruce (March 2011), On Libya, the Contours of the Emerging International Semi-Order, Washington, D.C.: Brookings Institution
- Jones, Bruce (March 2011), On the Libya No-Fly Zone, Put the UN Security Council Front Forward, Washington, D.C.: Brookings Institution
- Jones, Bruce; Andrew Hart (2010). "How Do Rising Powers Rise?". Survival. 52 (6). Archived from the original on 19 July 2011.
- Jones, Bruce; Richard Gowan (July 2010), Back to Basics: The UN and crisis diplomacy in an age of strategic uncertainty (PDF), New York, New York: NYU Center on International Cooperation, archived from the original (PDF) on 1 October 2011
