= Daniel Webster Gill =

American politician

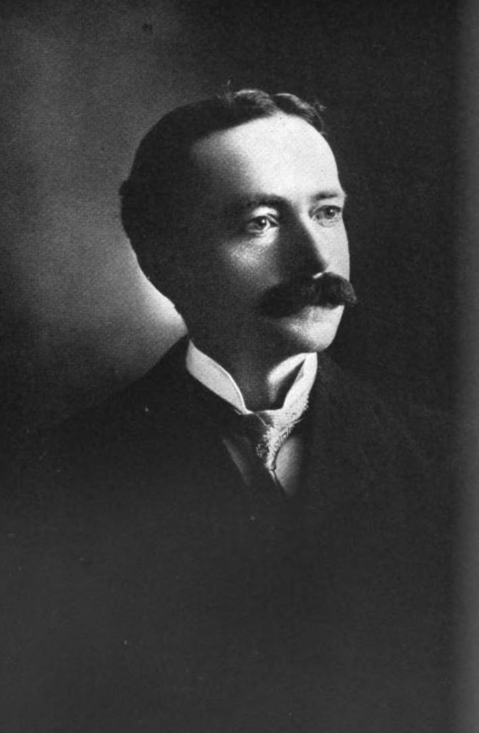

Member of the Wyoming Senate
- In office 1915–1919
- Preceded by: John B. Kendrick

23rd and 26th Mayor of Cheyenne, Wyoming
- In office 1905–1906
- Preceded by: Moses Patrick Keefe
- Succeeded by: P. S. Cook
- In office 1913–1914
- Preceded by: L. R. Bresnahan
- Succeeded by: R. N. La Fontaine

Personal details
- Born: April 18, 1856 Hinsdale, Massachusetts, U.S.
- Died: October 27, 1933 (aged 77) Cheyenne, Wyoming, U.S.
- Resting place: Lakeview Cemetery, Cheyenne, Wyoming, U.S.
- Party: Democratic
- Parents: Bartholomew Gill (father); Mary Dwyer (mother)
- Education: Connecticut Literary Institution

Daniel Webster Gill (April 18, 1856 – October 27, 1933) was an American politician who served as the 23rd and 26th Mayor of Cheyenne, Wyoming and in the Wyoming Senate as a Democrat.

== Early life ==
Daniel Webster Gill was born on April 18, 1856, in Hinsdale, Massachusetts to Bartholomew Gill and Mary Dwyer. He graduated from the Connecticut Literary Institution and being a clerk in Springfield, Massachusetts. In 1883, he moved to the Wyoming Territory and became a clerk for the Secretary of the Territory for six years. In 1890, he became involved in selling real estate in Cheyenne.

== Career ==
He served as mayor of Cheyenne from 1903 to 1904, and again from 1913 to 1914. From 1915 to 1919, he served in the Wyoming Senate. In 1904, he was appointed as the United States commissioner for the Cheyenne district and held the position until his death.

== Later life ==
He died at a hospital in Cheyenne, Wyoming on October 27, 1933.
