= List of mayors of Cheyenne, Wyoming =

Mayor of Cheyenne, Wyoming
- Incumbent; Patrick Collins since January 4, 2021
- Seat: Cheyenne, Wyoming
- Appointer: Cheyenne City Council
- Formation: 1867
- First holder: H. M. Hook

The following is a list of mayors of Cheyenne, Wyoming. The current mayor is Patrick Collins.

== List ==
#	Party	Mayor	Term start	Term end
1	Nonpartisan	H. M. Hook	1867	1868
2	Democratic	Luke Murrin	1868	1869
3	Nonpartisan	W. W. Slaughter	1869	1869
4	Nonpartisan	J. H. Martin	1870	1870
5	Nonpartisan	Jervis Joslin	1871	1872
6	Nonpartisan	M. Sloan	1872	1872
7	Democratic	M. V. Boughton	1873	1874
8	Nonpartisan	George Cassels	1874	1874
9	Nonpartisan	I. C. Whipple	1875	1875
10	Nonpartisan	L. R. Bresnahan	1876	1876
11	Nonpartisan	D. Fisk	1877	1877
12	Nonpartisan	L. R. Bresnahan (2)	1878	1879
13	Nonpartisan	F. E. Addoms	1880	1881
14	Republican	Joseph M. Carey	1881	1885
15	Nonpartisan	Francis E. Warren	1885	1885
16	Nonpartisan	A. H. Reel	1885	1886
17	Nonpartisan	Charles W. Riner	1887	1890
18	Nonpartisan	L. R. Bresnahan (3)	1891	1892
19	Nonpartisan	Ed F. Stahle	1893	1895
20	Nonpartisan	Samuel Merrill	1896	1897
21	Nonpartisan	William R. Schnitger	1897	1900
22	Nonpartisan	J. L. Murray	1901	1902
22	Republican	Moses Patrick Keefe	1903	1904
23	Democratic	Daniel Webster Gill	1905	1906
24	Nonpartisan	P. S. Cook	1907	1910
25	Nonpartisan	L. R. Bresnahan (4)	1911	1912
26	Democratic	Daniel Webster Gill (2)	1913	1914
27	Nonpartisan	R. N. La Fontaine	1914	1917
28	Nonpartisan	Edward W. Stone	1918	1919
29	Nonpartisan	Ed P. Taylor	1920	1923
30	Nonpartisan	Archie Allison	1924	1925
31	Nonpartisan	Charles W. Riner (2)	1926	1929
32	Nonpartisan	Cal Holliday	1930	1931
33	Nonpartisan	J. F. Weyhrecht	1932	1933
34	Nonpartisan	Archie Allison (2)	1934	1940
35	Democratic	Ed Warren	1940	1944
36	Republican	Ira L. Hanna	1944	1944
37	Republican	Bruce S. Jones	1944	1946
38	Nonpartisan	John J. Mcinerney	1946	1947
39	Nonpartisan	Benjamin C. Nelson	1949	1951
40	Nonpartisan	Edward Gowdy	1951	1951
41	Democratic	Ed Warren (2)	1951	1952
42	Nonpartisan	R. E. Cheever	1952	1954
43	Nonpartisan	Val S. Christensen	1954	1957
44	Nonpartisan	Worth Story	1958	1961
45	Democratic	Bill Nation	1962	1965
46	Nonpartisan	Bill Herbert Kingham	1966	1967
47	Nonpartisan	George R. Cox	1968	1969
48	Nonpartisan	Floyd Holland	1970	1971
49	Nonpartisan	James D. Van Velzor	1972	1973
50	Democratic	Bill Nation (2)	1973	1976
51	Nonpartisan	Donald Erickson	1977	1988
52	Nonpartisan	Gary Schaeffer	1989	1992
53	Nonpartisan	Leo Pando	1993	2001
54	Nonpartisan	Jack R. Spiker	2001	2008
55	Nonpartisan	Richard L. Kaysen	2009	2016
56	Republican	Marian Orr	2017	2020
57	Nonpartisan	Patrick Collins	2021	present

== See also ==
- Timeline of Cheyenne, Wyoming
