= List of rodeos =

This is a list of rodeos and rodeo-centered festivals, fairs or shows.

== Australia ==
=== New South Wales ===
- Walcha Campdraft and Rodeo in Walcha

=== Queensland ===
- Curry Merry Muster in Cloncurry
- Mareeba Rodeo in Mareeba
- Mount Isa Mines Rodeo in Mount Isa
- Warwick Rodeo in Warwick

== Brazil ==
=== Paraná ===
- Festa do Peão de Boiadeiro de Colorado in Colorado
- Rodeio de Douradina(Fepeina) in Douradina
- Rodeio de Maringá (Expoingá) in Maringá

=== São Paulo ===
- Festa do Peão de Americana in Americana
- Festa do Peão de Barretos in Barretos
- Jaguariúna Rodeo Festival in Jaguariúna

== Canada ==
=== Alberta ===
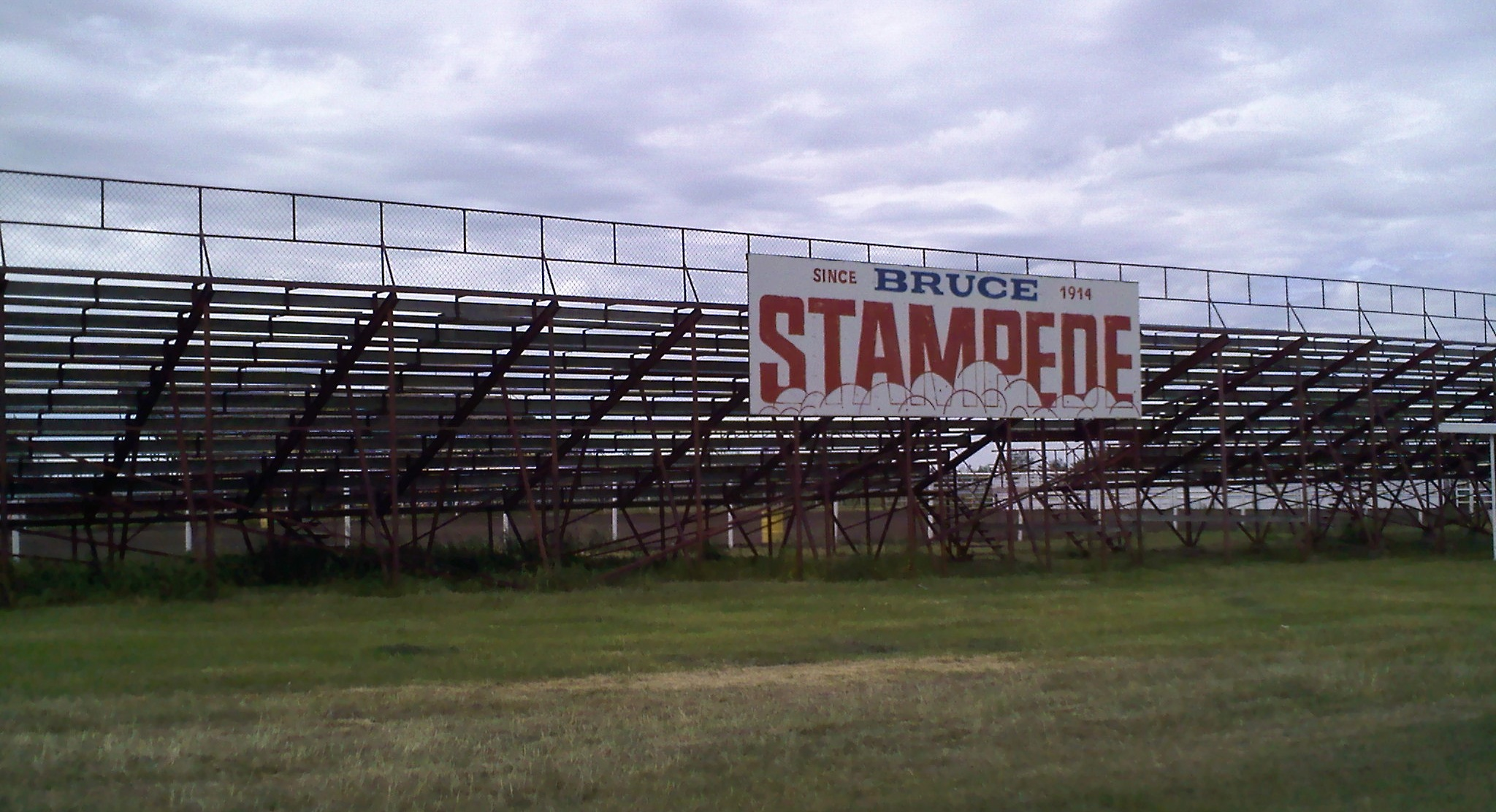
Sign on grandstand at Bruce, Alberta

- Bruce Stampede in Bruce
- Calgary Stampede in Calgary
- Canadian Finals Rodeo in Edmonton
- Grande Prairie Stompede in Grande Prairie
- Medicine Hat Exhibition & Stampede in Medicine Hat
- Ponoka Stampede in Ponoka
- Rainmaker Rodeo in St. Albert
- Raymond Stampede in Raymond
- Silver Birch Rodeo in Kikino
- Stavely Pro Rodeo in Stavely
- Strathmore Stampede in Strathmore

=== British Columbia ===
- Cloverdale Rodeo and Country Fair in Cloverdale
- Williams Lake Stampede in Williams Lake

=== Manitoba ===
- Manitoba Stampede and Exhibition in Morris

=== Quebec ===
- Festival Western de Saint-Tite in Saint-Tite

=== Saskatchewan ===
- Wood Mountain Stampede in Wood Mountain Regional Park

== Guyana ==
=== Upper Takutu-Upper Essequibo ===
- Rupununi Rodeo in Lethem

== Mexico ==
=== Baja California ===
- AgroBaja in Mexicali
- Fiesta en La Misión in La Misión
- Rodeo Rancho Casian in Tijuana

=== Chihuahua ===
- Expogan Chihuahua in Chihuahua City

=== Coahuila ===
- Rodeo Saltillo in Saltillo

=== Sonora ===
- Expogan Sonora in Hermosillo

== Philippines ==
=== Masbate ===
- Rodeo Masbateño in Masbate City

== United States ==
=== Alabama ===
- Limestone County Sheriff's Rodeo in Athens
- Southeastern Livestock Exposition Rodeo in Montgomery

=== Alaska ===
- Alaska State Fair Rodeo in Palmer
- Kenai Peninsula Fair Rodeo in Ninilchik
- Kodiak Rodeo and State Fair in Kodiak

=== Arizona ===
- Cave Creek Rodeo Days in Cave Creek
- Hondo Rodeo Fest in Phoenix
- Rodeo Scottsdale in Scottsdale
- Fiesta de los Vaqueros in Tucson
- Navajo Nation Fair & Rodeo in Window Rock
- White Mountain Apache Tribe Fair and Rodeo in Whiteriver
- World's Oldest Continuous Rodeo in Payson
- Yuma Silver Spur Rodeo in Yuma

=== Arkansas ===
- Arkansas State Fair Rodeo in Little Rock
- Old Fort Days Rodeo in Fort Smith
- Rodeo of the Ozarks in Springdale

=== California ===
- California Rodeo Salinas in Salinas
- Clovis Rodeo in Clovis
- Grand National Rodeo in Daly City
- Livermore Rodeo in Livermore
- Red Bluff Round-Up in Red Bluff
- Redding Rodeo in Redding
- San Bernardino County Sheriff's Rodeo in San Bernardino
- San Diego Rodeo in San Diego
- Santa Maria Elks Rodeo in Santa Maria
- San Benito County Saddle Horse Show & Rodeo in Tres Pinos

=== Colorado ===
- Boulder County Fair Livestock Show & Rodeo in Boulder
- Cattlemen's Days & Rodeo in Gunnison
- Colorado State Fair & Rodeo in Pueblo
- Carbondale Wild West Rodeo in Carbondale
- Estes Park Rooftop Rodeo in Estes Park
- Greeley Stampede in Greeley
- National Western Stock Show in Denver
- Pikes Peak or Bust Rodeo in Colorado Springs
- Top of the World Rodeo in Cripple Creek
- Wet Mountain Valley Stampede in Westcliffe

=== Connecticut ===
- Goshen Stampede in Goshen

=== Delaware ===
- First State Stampede in Harrington

=== Florida ===
- Arcadia Rodeo in Arcadia
- Brighton Field Day & PRCA Rodeo at the Brighton Reservation
- Homestead Rodeo in Homestead
- Okeechobee Cowtown Rodeo in Okeechobee
- Silver Spurs Rodeo in Kissimmee
- Southeastern Pro Rodeo in Ocala

=== Georgia ===
- Georgia National Rodeo in Perry

=== Idaho ===
- Cassia County Fair & Rodeo in Burley
- Days of the Old West Rodeo in Hailey
- Eagle Rodeo in Eagle
- Snake River Stampede in Nampa
- Lewiston Round-Up in Lewiston
- That Famous Preston Night Rodeo in Preston

=== Illinois ===
- Illinois State Fair Rodeo in Springfield
- Pioneer City Rodeo in Palestine
- Sonny Acres Farm Pro Rodeo in West Chicago
- Great Chicagoland Pro Rodeo in Yorkville

=== Iowa ===
- Council Bluffs PRCA Rodeo in Council Bluffs
- Cherokee PRCA Rodeo in Cherokee
- Dayton Championship Rodeo in Dayton
- Edgewood Pro Rodeo Days in Edgewood
- Iowa's Championship Rodeo in Sidney
- Jackson County Pro Rodeo in Bellevue
- Tri State Rodeo in Fort Madison

=== Kansas ===
- Beef Empire Days Rodeo in Garden City
- Dodge City Roundup Rodeo in Dodge City
- Flint Hills Rodeo in Strong City
- Kansas Biggest Rodeo in Phillipsburg
- Seward County PRCA Rodeo in Liberal
- Wild Bill Hickok Rodeo in Abilene

=== Louisiana ===
- Angola Prison Rodeo at the Louisiana State Penitentiary
- Cowboy's PRCA Rodeo in Scott
- DeepmSouth PRCA Rodeo in Winnsboro
- Springhill PRCA Championship Rodeo in Springhill

=== Maine ===
- Apple Hill Stables Charity Rodeo in Levant
- Cumberland County Fair Rodeo in Cumberland

=== Michigan ===
- Motor City Rodeo in Oxford
- U.P. Championship Rodeo in Iron River

=== Missouri ===
- American Royal in Kansas City
- Cattlemen Days Rodeo in Ashland
- Ozark Empire PRCA Pro Rodeo in Springfield
- Sikeston Jaycee Bootheel Rodeo in Sikeston

=== Montana ===
- Home of Champions Rodeo in Red Lodge
- Last Chance Stampede and Fair in Helena
- Livingston Roundup Rodeo in Livingston
- Northern International Livestock Exposition in Billings
- Rodeo Billings in Billings
- Wild Horse Stampede in Wolf Point

=== Minnesota ===
- Buffalo PRCA Championship Rodeo in Buffalo
- Headwaters PRCA Rodeo in Park Rapids
- Minnesota Horse Expo PRCA Rodeo in St. Paul
- Pine City Championship PRCA Rodeo in Pine City

=== Mississippi ===
- Desoto County Pro Rodeo in Nesbit
- Dixie National Rodeo in Jackson
- Lauderdale County Sheriff's Pro Rodeo in Meridian
- Magnolia Center Pro Rodeo in Laurel

=== Nebraska ===
- Blue Rose PRCA Charity Rodeo in Springfield
- Buffalo Bill Rodeo & Nebraskaland Days in North Platte
- Nebraska's Big Rodeo in Burwell
- Omaha River City Rodeo in Omaha
- Rodeo Grand Island in Grand Island

=== Nevada ===
- Clark County Fair and Rodeo in Logandale
- Helldorado Days Rodeo in Las Vegas
- National Finals Rodeo in Las Vegas
- Reno Rodeo in Reno

=== New Hampshire ===
- Sandwich Stampede in Sandwich

=== New Jersey ===
- Cowtown Rodeo in Woodstown

=== New Mexico ===
- Lea County Fair and Rodeo in Lovington
- New Mexico State Fair Rodeo in Albuquerque
- Rodeo de Santa Fe in Santa Fe
- Southern New Mexico State Fair Rodeo in Las Cruces

=== New York ===
- Alden Championship Rodeo & Bull Riding in Alden
- Adirondack Stampede Rodeo in Glens Falls
- Attica Championship Rodeo in Attica
- Gerry Rodeo in Gerry
- Painted Pony Championship Rodeo in Lake Luzerne

=== North Dakota ===
- Bismarck PRCA Rodeo in Bismarck
- Fargo PRCA Rodeo in Fargo
- Killdeer Mountain Round-Up Rodeo in Killdeer
- Mandan Rodeo Days in Mandan
- North Dakota Rough Rider Cup in Mandan
- North Dakota Winter Show Rodeo in Valley City
- Rodeo Minot in Minot
- Rough Rider Days Rodeo in Dickinson

=== Ohio ===
- Buckin' Ohio in Burbank
- Fox Hollow Rodeo in Waynesville
- High Steel Rodeo in North Bloomfield

=== Oklahoma ===
- Elk City Rodeo of Champions in Elk City
- Guymon Pioneer Days in Guymon
- Hugo PRCA Rodeo in Hugo
- International Finals Rodeo in Guthrie
- Lawton Rangers Rodeo in Lawton
- Oklahoma City ProRodeo in Oklahoma City
- Oklahoma Outlaw Prison Rodeo in McAlester (1940–2009)
- Will Rogers Stampede PRCA Rodeo in Claremore
- Woodward Elks Rodeo in Woodward

=== Oregon ===
- Chief Joseph Days Rodeo in Joseph
- Clackamas County Fair and Rodeo in Canby
- Eastern Oregon Livestock Show & Rodeo in Union
- Farm City Pro Rodeo in Hermiston
- High Desert Stampede in Redmond
- Molalla Buckeroo in Molalla
- Pendleton Round-Up in Pendleton
- St. Paul Rodeo in St. Paul

=== South Dakota ===
- Black Hills Roundup in Belle Fourche
- Black Hills Stock Show & Rodeo in Rapid City
- Brookings PRCA Rodeo in Brookings
- Burke Stampede in Burke
- Central States Fair & Rodeo in Rapid City
- Corn Palace Stampede Rodeo in Mitchell
- Crystal Springs Rodeo in Clear Lake
- Governor's Cup in Sioux Falls
- Huron PRCA Rodeo in Huron
- Sitting Bull Stampede Rodeo in Mobridge

=== Tennessee ===
- Chattanooga Stampede Pro Rodeo in Chattanooga
- Franklin Rodeo in Franklin
- Music City Rodeo in Nashville

=== Texas ===
- ABC Pro Rodeo in Levelland
- Amarillo Tri-State Fair & Rodeo in Amarillo
- Cowboy Capital of the World PRCA Rodeo in Stpehenville
- Fort Worth Stock Show & Rodeo in Fort Worth
- Galveston County Fair & Rodeo in Galveston
- Heart O' Texas Fair & Rodeo in Waco
- Houston Livestock Show and Rodeo in Houston
- Los Fresnos Rodeo in Los Fresnos
- Mesquite Championship Rodeo in Mesquite
- North Texas State Fair and Rodeo in Denton
- Palomino Fest & Rodeo in Uvalde
- Pasadena Livestock Show & Rodeo in Pasadena
- Rio Grande Valley Livestock Show and Rodeo in Mercedes
- Rodeo Austin in Austin
- Rodeo El Paso in El Paso
- Rodeo Corpus Christi in Corpus Christi
- San Angelo Stock Show and Rodeo in San Angelo
- San Antonio Stock Show & Rodeo in San Antonio
- Sandhills Stock Show & Rodeo in Odessa
- South Texas Fair & Rodeo in Beaumont
- Stockyards Championship Rodeo in Fort Worth
- Tejas Rodeo in Bulverde
- Texas Cowboy Reunion in Stamford
- The American Rodeo in Arlington
- Walker County Fair & Pro Rodeo in Huntsville
- West of the Pecos Rodeo in Pecos
- West Texas Fair & Rodeo in Abilene
- XIT Ranch Rodeo and Reunion in Dalhart

=== Utah ===
- Days of '47 Rodeo in Salt Lake City
- Fiesta Days Rodeo in Spanish Fork
- Golden Spike PRCA Rodeo in Tremonton
- Lehi Round-Up Rodeo in Lehi
- Oakley Rodeo in Oakley
- Ogden Pioneer Day Rodeo in Ogden
- Pony Express PRCA Rodeo & Derby in Eagle Mountain
- Strawberry Days Rodeo in Pleasant Grove
- Ute Stampede Rodeo in Nephi

=== Vermont ===
- Pond Hill Ranch Pro Rodeo in Castleton

=== Washington ===
- Colorama Pro Rodeo in Grand Coulee
- Ellensburg Rodeo in Ellensburg
- Horse Heaven Round-Up in Kennewick
- Kitsap Stampede in Bremerton
- Moses Lake Round-Up in Moses Lake
- Omak Stampede in Omak
- Puyallup Rodeo in Puyallup
- Roy Pioneer Rodeo in Roy
- Toppenish Rodeo in Toppenish
- Walla Walla Frontier Days in Walla Walla

=== Wisconsin ===
- Brown County Fair PRCA Rodeo in De Pere
- Heart of the North Rodeo in Spooner
- Price County Rodeo in Phillips
- Mid-Western Rodeo in Manawa
- Midwest Horse Fair PRCA Rodeo in Madison
- Wisconsin River Pro Rodeo in Merrill

=== Wyoming ===
- Cheyenne Frontier Days in Cheyenne
- Cody Nite Rodeo in Cody
- Cody Stampede in Cody
- College National Finals Rodeo in Casper
- Jackson Hole Rodeo in Jackson Hole
- Sheridan WYO Rodeo in Sheridan

== See also ==
- Frontier Days
- List of corrals
