= Challenge of the Champions =

Lane Frost and Red Rock, with John Growney in the background, photographed by Sue Rosoff.

The Challenge of the Champions in 1988 was a series of seven matchups at seven rodeos that paired up then-reigning Professional Rodeo Cowboys Association (PRCA) World Champion Bull Rider Lane Frost with then-reigning PRCA Bucking Bull of the Year Red Rock. The publicity that the Challenge received increased the popularity of rodeos and bull riding amongst the general public.

== Background ==
Red Rock was an 1,800 pounds (820 kg) bucking bull. He had never been ridden in competition and had bucked Frost off at the 1985 National Finals Rodeo (NFR) and again at the 1986 NFR. This had kept Frost from riding all 10 of his finals bulls in 1986 and from winning the World Championship that year. Finally, Frost won the World Championship in 1987, the same year Red Rock won Bucking Bull of the Year.

Sometime in 1988, John Growney, Red Rock's owner, envisioned a special matchup between the two 1987 champions. It was decided that Frost and Red Rock would have seven showdowns at different rodeos in states across the West. The event was titled the "Challenge of the Champions." It was described as "a publicity match made in heaven," a popular cowboy versus the best bucking bull. Both had reached the pinnacle of the sport. The series was widely covered by the mainstream media, as the best of the best matchup between man and bull was "something that everybody could understand," Growney said.

Frost and Red Rock both had popular personalities. Frost was characterized as extroverted and playful, "quick with a smile and truly enjoyed meeting the fans". Red Rock "instinctively knew to take a victory lap" around the arena whenever he bucked off a rider, but was called a "gentle giant" outside of the rodeo ring.

== Series ==
The first match took place at the Red Bluff Round-Up on April 17, 1988 in Red Bluff, California, Red Rock's then-current home town. The crowd cheered louder for Red Rock than for Frost, who was bucked off after two seconds and commented that it was the first time he’d seen more people cheer for the bull than for him. The second match took place in Clovis, California, and Red Rock took that one also. The third match was in Redding, May 20, 1988, and Frost had studied videotapes, consulted with friends, and worked out prior to this event. Frost stayed on, and at the eight-second mark, Frost was still on Red Rock, and this was the first time that anyone had ever stayed on Red Rock for a qualifying ride. Frost was happy to explain how he changed his riding position by sitting well over to the right side, thus staying ahead of the bull’s motion. "I know I can't catch up to him when he goes to the right, I've tried."

The fourth match in Livermore, California, went to Frost, making the score at 2-2. This match was described as having Red Rock "wondering about Lane": The bull behaved differently than usual, giving Frost a side look before leaving the arena and foregoing any of his usual "victory laps" that he been taking after bucking off riders. It had been a 10 hour drive to Oregon from Livermore and Frost wanted to fly and unhappy because he wasn’t allowed to do so—Red Rock had to be transported via truck, so Frost also had to drive. Growney was in his truck smiling and waiting; Frost and Growney were good friends. At a rest stop along the way, Frost even paid a visit to Red Rock in his trailer.

Then both bull rider and bull traveled by road all night to Sisters, Oregon. This is where Red Rock had lived with his second owner, Mert Hunking, and had bucked in rodeos before joining the PRCA. On June 12, 1988, this fifth matchup was the last bull ride of that night. The atmosphere was excited and the crowd cheered for both rider and bull. Red Rock had an unusual left-hand delivery, but Frost hung on hard for the whistle, later saying it was one of his best rides. That left the match at 3-2 in Frost's favor. On July 4, 1988, at their sixth match in St. Paul, Oregon, Red Rock dumped Frost and tied up the matches at three each.

At Spanish Fork, July 25, 1988, was the 7th and final matchup. Frost remarked that Red Rock appeared calm and cool. Frost rode Red Rock to the eight second signal to win the Challenge of the Champions 4-3. Frost not only rode for eight seconds, the ride actually lasted 9.63 seconds.

The two were keen competitors inside the arena, but few people knew that Frost and Red Rock had an acquaintance outside of the arena and were quite fond of each other. Frost would visit the bull and Red Rock was said to enjoy Frost's back scratches.

Articles about the Challenge appeared in Sports Illustrated, ProRodeo Sports News, USA Today, and various regional publications. There was a feature on NBC's Sports Machine.

Date	Event	Venue	City	Winner	Series
April 17, 1988	Red Bluff Round-Up	Tehama County Fairgrounds	Red Bluff, California	Red Rock	1–0
April 1988	Clovis Rodeo	Clovis Rodeo Grounds	Clovis, California	Red Rock	2–0
May 20, 1988	Redding Rodeo	Redding Rodeo Grounds	Redding, California	Lane Frost	2–1
June 1988	Livermore Rodeo	Rodeo Grounds at Robertson Park	Livermore, California	Lane Frost	2–2
June 12, 1988	Sisters Rodeo	Sisters Rodeo Arena	Sisters, Oregon	Lane Frost	3–2
July 4, 1988	St. Paul Rodeo	St. Paul City Park	St. Paul, Oregon	Red Rock	3–3
July 25, 1988	Fiesta Days Rodeo	Spanish Fork Fairgrounds	Spanish Fork, Utah	Lane Frost	4–3

== After the Challenge ==
Following the series, Red Rock was returned to his retirement. Frost said of the Challenge:

Everybody can understand one on one. One of the greatest things that's happened in rodeo in a long time had just happened.

In 1989, Frost was killed by a bull named SO Takin' Care of Business, at Cheyenne Frontier Days. Frost had ridden the bull for a qualifying ride. After he dismounted, the bull turned toward him and pushed him down, and then pushed his horn into Frost's back. This resulted in broken ribs severing a main artery. That further cemented Growney's resolve to leave Red Rock retired. Frost is buried in Hugo, Oklahoma. Red Rock died in 1994.

Today, bull riders still watch video of the Challenge of the Champions match footage on YouTube. One of the more well-known videos consists of footage of the four matches Frost won. In a July 30, 2016 article published on the PBR's website about the 27th anniversary of Frost's death, it mentions bull riders Nathan Schaper and Kurt Shepherd and others as having watched and studied video of the challenge.

In 2009, a documentary film was made about the Challenge of the Champions. The DVD included interviews with Frost's parents, his friends, Red Rock's owner John Growney, sportscasters, photographers, and actors from the movie 8 Seconds. The documentary was favorably reviewed by the Daily Record News, which noted that even though it finishes with the deaths of the pair, "you still feel good about the story at the end...They loved the fans, and the fans loved them."

When similar matches between champion bulls and riders take place, they are compared to the Challenge of the Champions, like the 2010–14 matchups between J.B. Mauney and Bushwacker.
