= George Michael (sportscaster) =

American broadcaster (1939–2009)

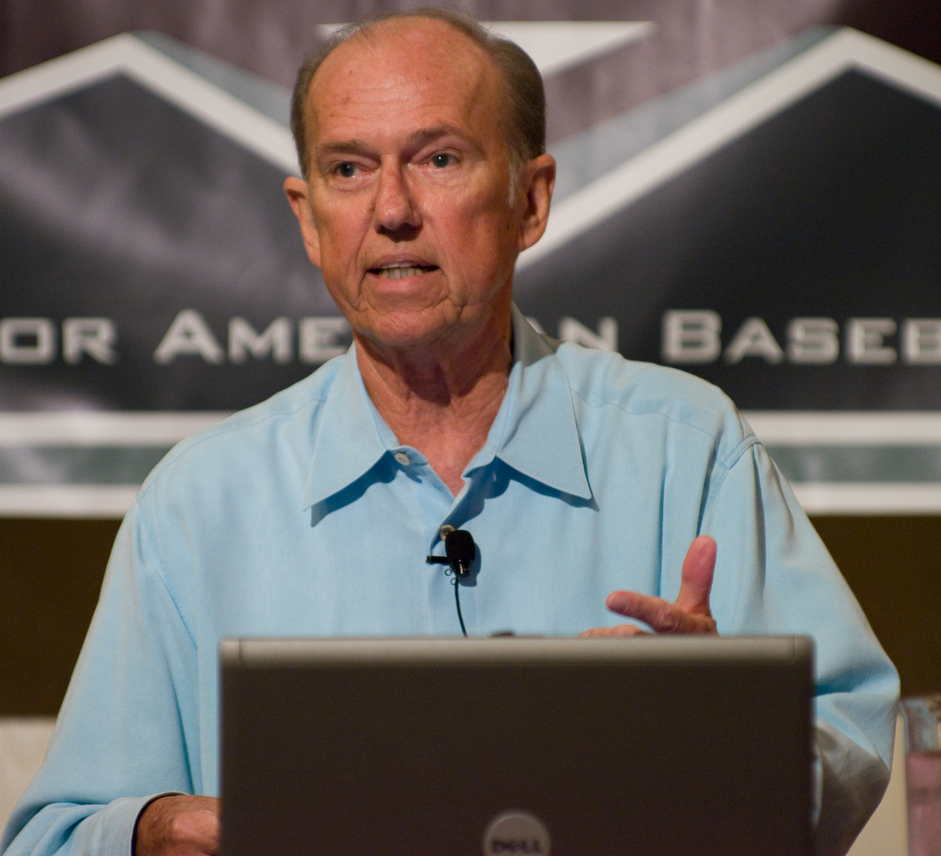
- Michael in 2009
- Born: George Michael Gimpel; March 24, 1939; St. Louis, Missouri, United States
- Died: December 24, 2009 (aged 70); Washington, D.C., United States
- Occupation(s): Disc jockey, sportscaster
- Years active: 1959–2008

George Michael (March 24, 1939 – December 24, 2009) was an American broadcaster best known nationally for The George Michael Sports Machine, his sports highlights television program. Originally named George Michael's Sports Final when it began as a local show in Washington, D.C., in 1980, it was nationally syndicated by NBC from 1984 until its final installment was aired on March 25, 2007. Michael won a Sports Emmy in 1985 for his work on The George Michael Sports Machine.

== Early life and career ==
Michael was born George Michael Gimpel in St. Louis, Missouri, on March 24, 1939, the son of Margaret and Earl Herman Gimpel. He grew up near Tower Grove Park in the city's south side, and graduated from St. Louis University High School. While attending Saint Louis University, he worked as a Midwest promoter for several record labels such as Scepter and Motown. It was also during this time when he made his radio broadcasting debut on a one-hour Sunday night show at midnight on WIL, which invited individual SLU students to be the hosts every week. He earned a full-time job as a disc jockey at the station after he was judged to be the best of the group.

His first radio appointment outside of his hometown was in 1962 at WRIT in Milwaukee, where he worked the 6-to-10 pm shift until he was reassigned to 5-to-9 morning drive time in early 1964. His next stop was at KBTR in Denver later in 1964, working under the name "King" George Michael for the first time. He earned the nickname due to his success in "ruling" evening radio.

He became one of the original Boss Jocks at WFIL in Philadelphia when its new Top 40 rock and roll format debuted on September 18, 1966. He served as music director and evening deejay for the next eight years. WFIL, which promoted itself as "Famous 56" after the transition, ended WIBG's listener ratings dominance and became the city's most popular station by the summer of 1967. Michael was the first Philadelphia rock and roll radio personality to read the scores of local high school football and basketball games on the air. He also helped to start the career of Howard Eskin by hiring him to be his engineer. Decades later, Eskin would be a contributor to The George Michael Sports Machine.

On George's last WFIL show (on September 6, 1974) he played "When Will I See You Again" by the Three Degrees, the first time that the record aired on any radio station. The playing of this on his show broke the song into the mainstream, and within two months was a huge international hit, reaching number one in the U.K., and number two in the United States. George was personal friends with the owners of Philadelphia International Records and the song's writers Kenny Gamble and Leon Huff.

Michael, noted for his energetic style, was hired by WABC in New York City; his first on-air stint there was on the evening of September 9, 1974. Michael now not only was entering the nation's largest media market; he also succeeded radio legend "Cousin Brucie" Morrow, who had jumped to competitor WNBC. Several incidents from Michael's radio stint there have been chronicled in Morrow's autobiography. Even though he was reunited with Dan Ingram and Ron Lundy (colleagues from his WIL days in St. Louis), Michael's time at WABC, which ended on November 17, 1979, was mostly frustrating because he was no longer a music director who had any influence on a playlist which was much shorter than the ones with which he was more familiar. One of the highlights during his time at the station occurred when he anchored its coverage of the New York City blackout of 1977 after the music format was temporarily suspended for the night.

His first experience in sports broadcasting also came in 1974 when he was a television announcer for the Baltimore Orioles on WJZ-TV. He declined an offer to work for the ballclub full-time in order to accept the WABC position. As part of the deal to bring him to New York, Michael also worked for WABC-TV as the weekend sports anchor and a color commentator on New York Islanders telecasts for several seasons, paired mainly with Tim Ryan. He served as an occasional substitute on ABC American Contemporary Network's Speaking of Sports show whenever Howard Cosell, the primary commentator, was on vacation or assignment.

== Television career ==
As the primary sports anchor at WRC-TV in Washington from 1980 to 2007, Michael was easily one of the most popular media personalities in the Washington area. Michael got significant latitude in his programming, employing a bevy of segments some viewers might consider old-fashioned, including his "Tuesday Replays" and "Wednesday Wrestling". He also had devoted extensive coverage to and was considered a significant influence in the popularity of NASCAR, broadcasting interviews with famous drivers such as Dale Earnhardt well before that sport became what it is today. An avid equestrian, Michael also broadcast segments on bull riding and rodeo. He was the play-by-play announcer for most of the Professional Bull Riders's Built Ford Tough Series NBC telecasts during the 2003 and 2004 seasons, including the final day of the PBR World Finals each year. Michael also covered the career of bull rider Lane Frost, who was killed at Cheyenne Frontier Days in 1989 by the bull he rode. Michael covered the matchups between Frost and the undefeated bull Red Rock called the Challenge of the Champions. Michael was inducted into the Cheyenne Frontier Days Hall of Fame in 2006 for his efforts.

Michael's affable personality enabled him to land rare interviews with many aloof local and national sports personalities. For example, Michael's team at WRC-TV had been the only local sportscasters allowed to broadcast from inside the Washington Redskins' FedExField during the season.

Two movies, 8 Seconds and The Rookie, were inspired by stories featured on The Sports Machine. Michael made a cameo appearance in the former, as well as in The Silence of the Lambs and Tin Cup. The Sports Machine was also featured in There's Something About Mary.

In November 2005, Michael was seriously injured in a horseback riding accident. He broke several ribs and injured his wrists during the mishap at his Comus farm in upper Montgomery County, Maryland. Michael resumed his duties in December 2005.

=== Later career ===
Michael left his role as WRC-TV's daily sports anchor on March 1, 2007, following a dispute with WRC-TV over layoffs of his staff imposed company-wide by NBCUniversal. The George Michael Sports Machine went off the air on March 25, 2007. He continued to host weekend sports panel shows such as Full Court Press (basketball season) and Redskins Report (football season) as well as interviews at Redskins Park on Mondays with Jim Zorn and Joe Bugel through December 2008. He was completely dropped from WRC-TV owing to budget cuts despite the fact Redskins Report was consistently one of WRC's top sports shows. He indicated at the time of his layoff that he would like to work on a panel show again but not on a nightly newscast.

== Personal life ==
He and his wife, Pat, whom he married in 1978 and who produced the Sports Machine, had daughters Cindi and Michelle and son Brad. All three children were from his first marriage and wife, also named Pat.

Michael died at age 70 at Sibley Memorial Hospital on December 24, 2009, after being diagnosed with B-cell chronic lymphocytic leukemia two years prior.
