= Death of Lane Frost =

Fatal bull riding accident

- Date: July 30, 1989; 37 years ago
- Time: 3:30 p.m. (MDT)
- Venue: Cheyenne Frontier Days Arena
- Location: Cheyenne, Wyoming, U.S.
- Type: Fatal bull riding accident
- Deaths: Lane Frost
- Burial: Mount Olivet Cemetery; Hugo, Oklahoma, U.S.
- Coroner: Laramie County Coroner
- Footage: youtube.com

On July 30, 1989, American professional rodeo cowboy Lane Frost died after being gored by a bull named Takin' Care of Business during the Cheyenne Frontier Days Rodeo in Cheyenne, Wyoming. Frost began his ride on Takin' Care of Business at 3:30 p.m. Mountain Daylight Time (UTC–7), during which he completed a qualified ride before being gored in the ribs. He stood up briefly, motioning for help, before collapsing. Frost was rushed to nearby Memorial Hospital, where he was pronounced dead at 3:59 p.m. at the age of 25.

== Background ==
At the time of his death, Frost had been a bull rider in the Professional Rodeo Cowboys Association (PRCA) for eight years and was looking to qualify for the National Finals Rodeo (NFR) for the sixth consecutive year. He previously won the 1986 NFR bull riding average title, and the 1987 PRCA bull riding world title. In 1988, Frost teamed up with John Growney of Growney Brothers Rodeo Company to take part in the Challenge of the Champions, which matched Frost up against the 1987 PRCA Bucking Bull of the Year, Red Rock, in a seven-ride series. Red Rock had previously been unridden in professional competition, but Frost would successfully ride him in four of the seven outs to win the competition. Frost also competed in the Rodeo '88 Challenge Cup, which was held as part of the Cultural Olympiad in association with the 1988 Winter Olympics in Calgary, Canada.

== Circumstances ==
=== Preceding events ===
On July 26, 1989, Frost earned an 86-point ride, his highest score of the year, during the first round of the bull riding competition at the Cheyenne Frontier Days Rodeo in Cheyenne, Wyoming, propelling himself to the final round.

=== The accident ===
On July 30, the final round of the competition took place. Frost drew a Brahma bull named Takin' Care of Business, who was owned by Bad Company Rodeo. At 3:30 p.m. Mountain Daylight Time (UTC–7), Frost and the bull exited chute #7, where he earned a qualified ride, scoring 85 points. However, Frost dismounted awkwardly, landing directly in the bull's line of sight. The bull then stepped on Frost's chaps before hooking him with its horn directly in the ribs. Frost stood up briefly and motioned toward Dr. Skip Ross and fellow competitor Nick Warren before collapsing. Frost was rushed to nearby Memorial Hospital, where he was pronounced dead at 3:59 p.m. at the age of 25. No autopsy was performed. It was assumed that when Takin' Care of Business pushed Frost against the ground, the force of the bull's body weight against its horn broke several of Frost's ribs, which punctured his heart and lungs and severed a major artery. Frost would posthumously finish third in the event and earn nearly $4,000.

== Aftermath ==
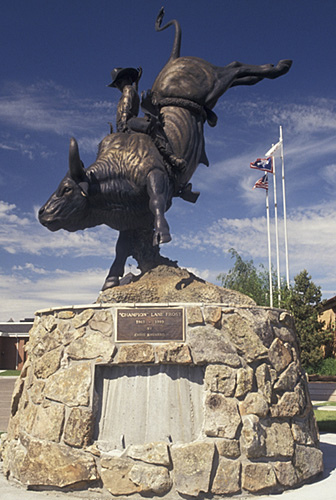
A statue depicting Frost riding a bull at the Cheyenne Frontier Days Old West Museum

=== Funeral ===
On August 2, 1989, Frost's funeral service was held at First Baptist Church in Atoka, Oklahoma. An estimated 3,500 people attended. After the service, Frost was taken to Mount Olivet Cemetery in Hugo, Oklahoma, where he was buried beside his longtime mentor, Freckles Brown.

=== Tributes ===
On November 4, 1989, at the National Finals Rodeo (NFR), Tuff Hedeman, one of Frost's traveling partners, dedicated his 10th-round ride to Frost. Hedeman made a qualified ride on Beutler & Gaylord's No. 4 but rode well past the whistle. Prior to the ride, he stated: "I'm gonna ride him an extra eight seconds for Lane."

In 1990, the Rodeo Cowboy Alumni established the Lane Frost Memorial Award, an award given to cowboys who made a significant and lasting contribution to bull riding. They also established the Lane Frost Memorial Scholarship, which is a $4,000 scholarship designed to support high school seniors who had participated in rodeo and reached the National High School Rodeo Finals. The winner is selected by the National High School Rodeo Association's selection committee.

On July 26, 1993, a bronze statue that depicted Frost was dedicated in front of the Cheyenne Frontier Days Old West Museum. The statue was self-commissioned by former bull rider, turned sculptor, Chris Navarro.

On February 25, 1994, a movie dramatizing Frost's life titled 8 Seconds was released. Luke Perry starred as Frost.

In 1996, Professional Bull Riders (PBR) announced the Lane Frost/Brent Thurman Award, which is awarded annually to the highest-scoring single ride at the PBR World Finals. The award's namesake is shared between Frost and Brent Thurman, a fellow bull rider who died in a similar way as Frost. Adriano Morães won the first award when he scored 93.5 points on Western Trails' Shotgun Red.

=== Awards and honors ===
In December 1989, Frost posthumously won the Coors Favorite Cowboy award at the NFR.

In 1990, Frost was announced as the first recipient of the Lane Frost Memorial Award. That same year, he became the youngest cowboy ever inducted into the ProRodeo Hall of Fame.

In 1999, Frost was inducted into the PBR Ring of Honor. The following year, he was inducted into the Texas Cowboy Hall of Fame.

In 2003, he was inducted into the Cheyenne Frontier Days Hall of Fame.

On November 21, 2008, Frost was inducted into the National Rodeo Hall of Fame.

On May 21, 2017, Frost was inducted into the Bull Riding Hall of Fame inside Cowtown Coliseum at the Fort Worth Stockyards in Fort Worth, Texas.

On October 23, 2025, the Texas Trail of Fame honored Frost with a bronze star marker at the Fort Worth Stockyards. The induction ceremony took place at Billy Bob's Texas.

=== Safety improvements ===
Before the accident, protective equipment was optional with riders only using it if they felt it was necessary for their survival. Cody Lambert, another of Frost's traveling partners, helped create a protective vest that would protect riders from direct trauma to their torsos. In 1996, protective vests were made mandatory by the PBR and subsequently for all bull riders, professional or otherwise.
