= Red Bluff Round-Up =

Stop on the professional rodeo circuit

- Genre: Rodeo, livestock show and fair
- Dates: Mid to late April
- Locations: Tehama County Fairgrounds, Red Bluff, California, United States
- Founded: 1921
- Website: redbluffroundup.com

The Red Bluff Round-Up is a major stop on the Professional Rodeo Cowboys Association (PRCA) circuit that takes place in Red Bluff, California, United States. It officially began in 1921 and was inducted to the ProRodeo Hall of Fame in 2015. The Round-Up is the largest three day rodeo in the country.

== History ==
The Red Bluff Round-Up unofficially started in 1918 at the A.H. Clough Ranch when some of the workers decided to hold some competitions. This continued in 1919 when more informal competitions were held in Vina, California. Locals from Red Bluff and Chico saw the success of these events and started the Northern California Round-Up Association and put on the First Deer Creek Round-Up. The first official Red Bluff Round-Up was held in 1921 when it was held in October. It was moved to late April sometime between 1922 and 1926. The Round-Up was postponed during the Great Depression and World War II. The Round-Up was first televised in 1970 on around 200 different stations. In 1988, it hosted one of the “Challenge of the Champions” between the ProRodeo Hall of Famer, Lane Frost, and the hometown 1987 PRCA Bucking Bull of the Year, Red Rock. In 1996, the Round-Up switched to the three-day format.

In 2000, Round-Up officials started an event unique to the rodeo, the Wild Ride. It consists of 12 contestants competing in saddle bronc riding while dressed in costumes. It is held during the Sunday performance. Awards are given to the top placements, consisting of a cash prize and a new saddle for first place. In 2018, the Round-Up was one of the first rodeos in the country to have women’s breakaway roping on a professional level.

== Community impact ==
The city of Red Bluff hosts many different events during rodeo week, including: blood drives, luncheons, a golf tournament, a bowling tournament, auctions, a pancake breakfast, a chili cook-off, a concert after the Saturday performance, and a parade through the downtown. These events may vary from year to year, with the expectation of the Parade, which celebrated its 70th year in 2024.

The Round-Up brings a lot of traffic through Tehama County, as hundreds of contestants come from across the world to compete, and the performances draw crowds ranging in the tens of thousands. In 2024, there were 675 competitors and 35,000 people in attendance. This influx of people helps boost the economy, bringing in millions of dollars. The Round-Up also gives back to the community by giving out scholarships and funding local organizations.
