= Douradina =

Douradina may refer to:

- Douradina, Paraná
- Douradina, Mato Grosso do Sul
