= Silver Spurs Arena =

Indoor arena in Kissimmee, Florida, U.S.

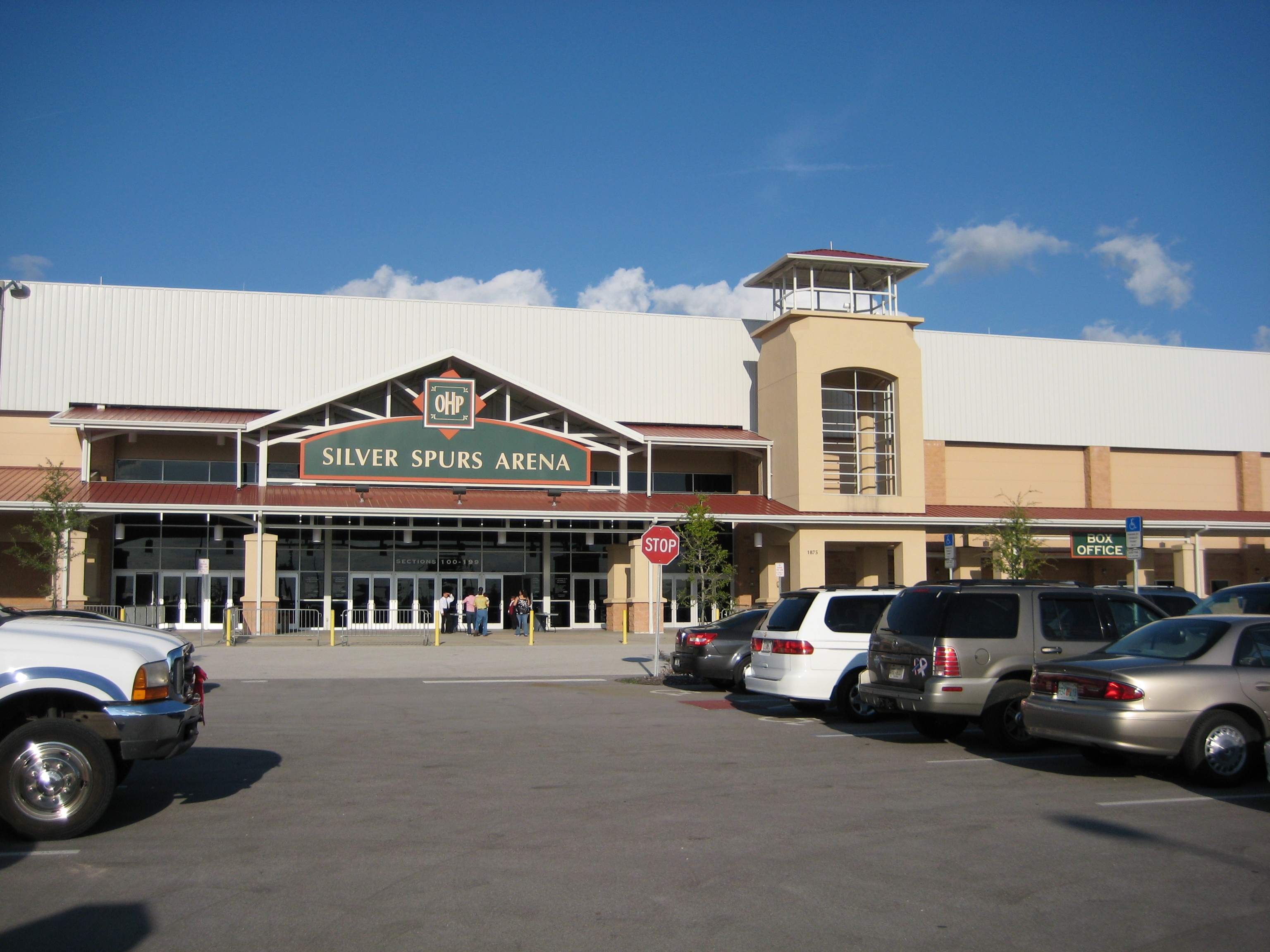
- Silver Spurs Arena
- Interactive map of Silver Spurs Arena
- Location: Kissimmee, Florida
- Coordinates: 28°17′53.97″N 81°22′9.19″W
- Owner: Osceola County
- Operator: ASM Global
- Capacity: 8,000 (Hockey); 3,670 (Theatre); 6,570 (Half-house concert); 8,253-11,403 (arena concert)

Construction
- Opened: September, 2003

Tenants
- Silver Spurs Rodeo; Florida Seals (SPHL) (2005–2007); Kissimmee Kreatures (NIFL) (2005); Osceola Ghostriders (WIFL) (2007); Orlando SeaWolves (MASL) (2018–2020); Osceola Magic (NBA G League) (2023–present)

Silver Spurs Arena is a multi-purpose arena in Kissimmee, Florida. The arena is 33,600 square feet (3,120 m^{2}), has 8,300 seats (maximum 10,000 seats) with 12 luxury skyboxes, and is climate-controlled. Home to the Silver Spurs Rodeo, a semi-annual rodeo event, the indoor arena opened in 2003 to replace the original outdoor grandstand. Concerts, family shows, school graduations, and sporting events are also held there. The arena is part of the Osceola Heritage Park entertainment complex.

Silver Spurs Arena was home to the Florida Seals of the Southern Professional Hockey League from October 2005 until January 4, 2007. During the 2005 season, it was home to the Kissimmee Kreatures of the National Indoor Football League. During 2006, the team was to be known as the Osceola Outlaws but then changed their name to Osceola Football as another team in the NIFL located in Billings, Montana held that nickname. For the 2007 season the team changed its nickname to Osceola Ghostriders and played in the World Indoor Football League. From 2018 to 2020, it served as the home of the Orlando SeaWolves of the Major Arena Soccer League.

On April 11, 2023, it was announced that it will serve as the home of the NBA G League team Osceola Magic.

Since 2007, several boxing events have occurred at the arena, featuring renowned fighters such as Chad Dawson, Wilfredo Vazquez Jr., Emanuel Navarrete and Erickson Lubin.
