= Silver Spurs Rodeo =

Biannual rodeo in Kissimmee, Florida

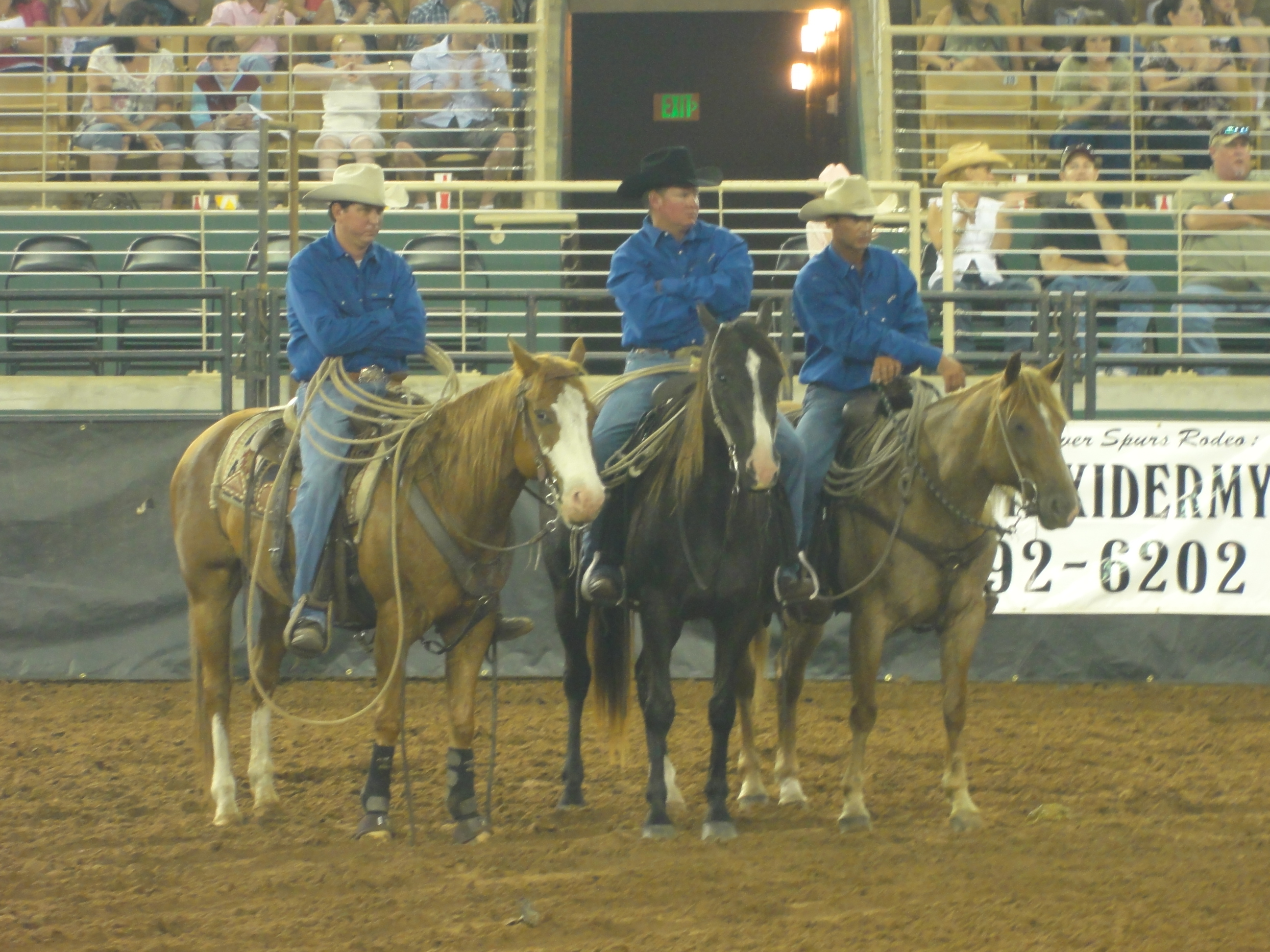
Silver Spurs Rodeo

The Silver Spurs Rodeo is a rodeo held twice per year in Kissimmee, Florida. During the late 1980s, it was one of the fifty largest rodeos in the United States, and is billed as the largest rodeo east of the Mississippi River. Since 1994, it has been the official state rodeo of Florida.

== History ==
In 1941, the Silver Spurs Riding Club was formed in Kissimmee. In 1944, at the height of World War II, the Riding Club sponsored a rodeo to encourage local citizens to purchase war bonds. The first rodeo was held on July 4, 1944, and in 1951, a February event was added to the calendar.

The February rodeo is important enough to the region's self-image that it is a school holiday (for teachers and for students) throughout the county. The holiday is named “Rodeo Day”, and is traditionally the third Friday in February, coinciding with the Silver Spurs Rodeo, and is recognized in place of Presidents' Day or Washington’s Birthday in the School District of Osceola County, which is a school holiday on the third Monday of February in most other school districts in the United States. The earliest official mention of Rodeo Day occurred in 1953. The tradition began after school officials observed students taking time off to attend the rodeo.

The first rodeo was held on land donated by Henry O. Partin, a legendary rancher in Kissimmee who, at one point in time, owned 60,000 acres of land in Osceola County. In 1949, the Riding Club bought a 15-acre parcel of land (to which they added an additional 7.5 acres the following year), and built a stadium, stands, and a concession area. In 2003, the club built a new indoor stadium, the Silver Spurs Arena, which features luxury seats and bar service.

During the late 1980s, the rodeo was one of the fifty largest rodeos in the United States, with a purse of approximately US$60,000. By 2005, however, attendance at had dropped slightly, and as of 2009, the purse had declined to approximately $50,000. The Professional Rodeo Cowboys Association did not list the Silver Spur Rodeo in their top 50 rodeo listing for 2009. As the demographics of the region change, with more Hispanic residents moving into the area, the rodeo has moved to increase its appeal to the new residents; it held its first Latin rodeo in 2005, weaving salsa and hip-hop music into its traditional events.

In 1994, the Silver Spurs Rodeo was designated as the Official State Rodeo by the Florida Legislature.

== See also ==
- List of rodeos
- List of Florida state symbols
