= Australian Braford =

Breed of cattle

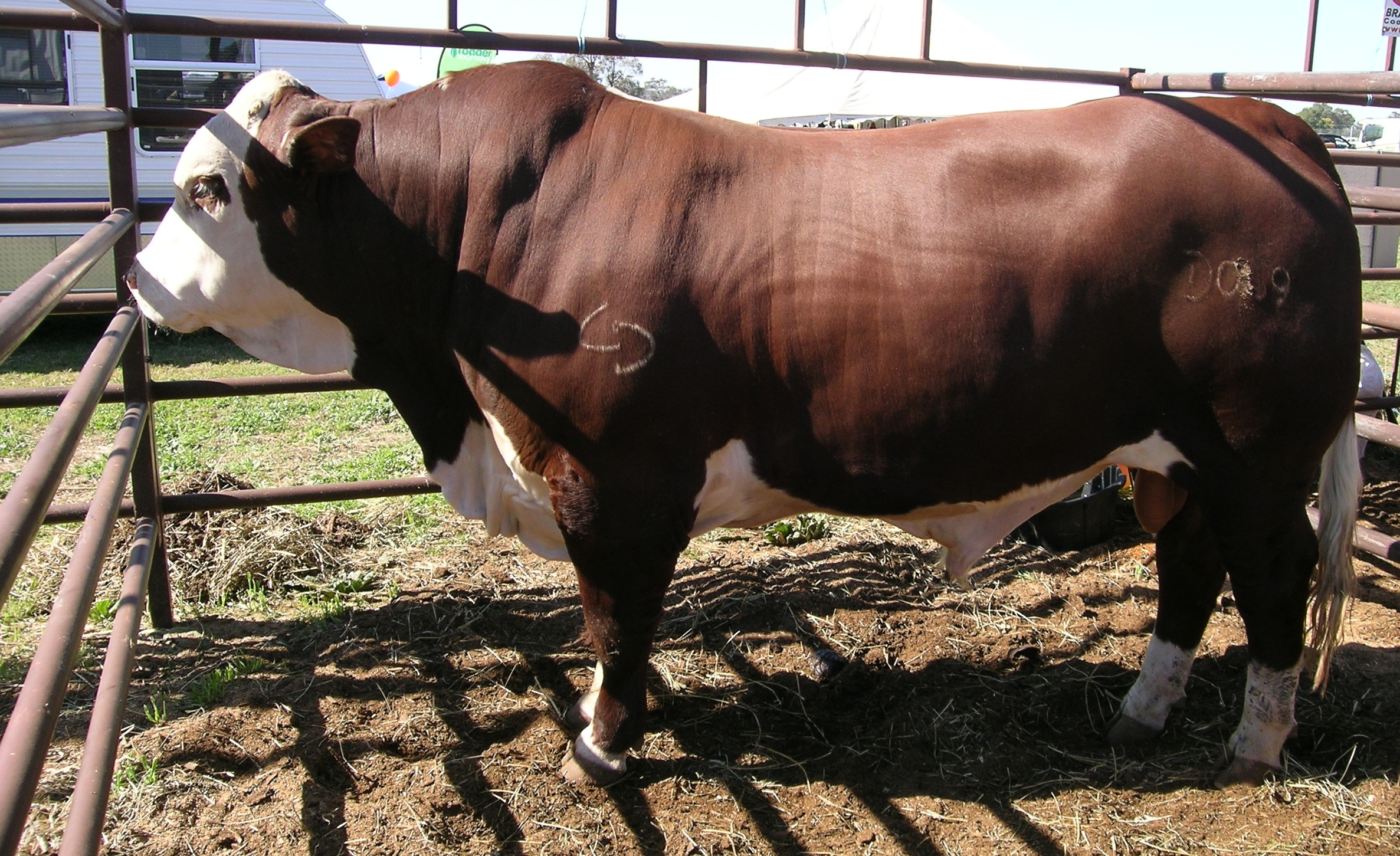
An Australian Braford bull

The Australian Braford is a breed of beef cattle, developed in Queensland between 1946 and 1952 in a program to produce cattle that were resistant to cattle ticks and tolerated the heat better than some other breeds.

The Braford breed originated at ‘Edengarry’ north of Rockhampton in Queensland in 1946 when the Rea Brothers introduced Brahman bulls into their Hereford breeders to help combat the effects of drought and ticks.

Brafords have a small hump, loose skin and a short coat that is red and white, possessing a colour pattern similar to that of Hereford cattle. Australian Brafords may be horned or polled. The genetic background of the breed is approximately 50 per cent Hereford and 50 per cent Brahman.

Brafords are mainly found in NSW and Queensland Australia. Braford semen has been exported into South America and South Africa. Live cattle exports have been made into Indonesia and Thailand.

== See also ==
- Braford
