= Cheyenne Frontier Days Arena =

American rodeo venue

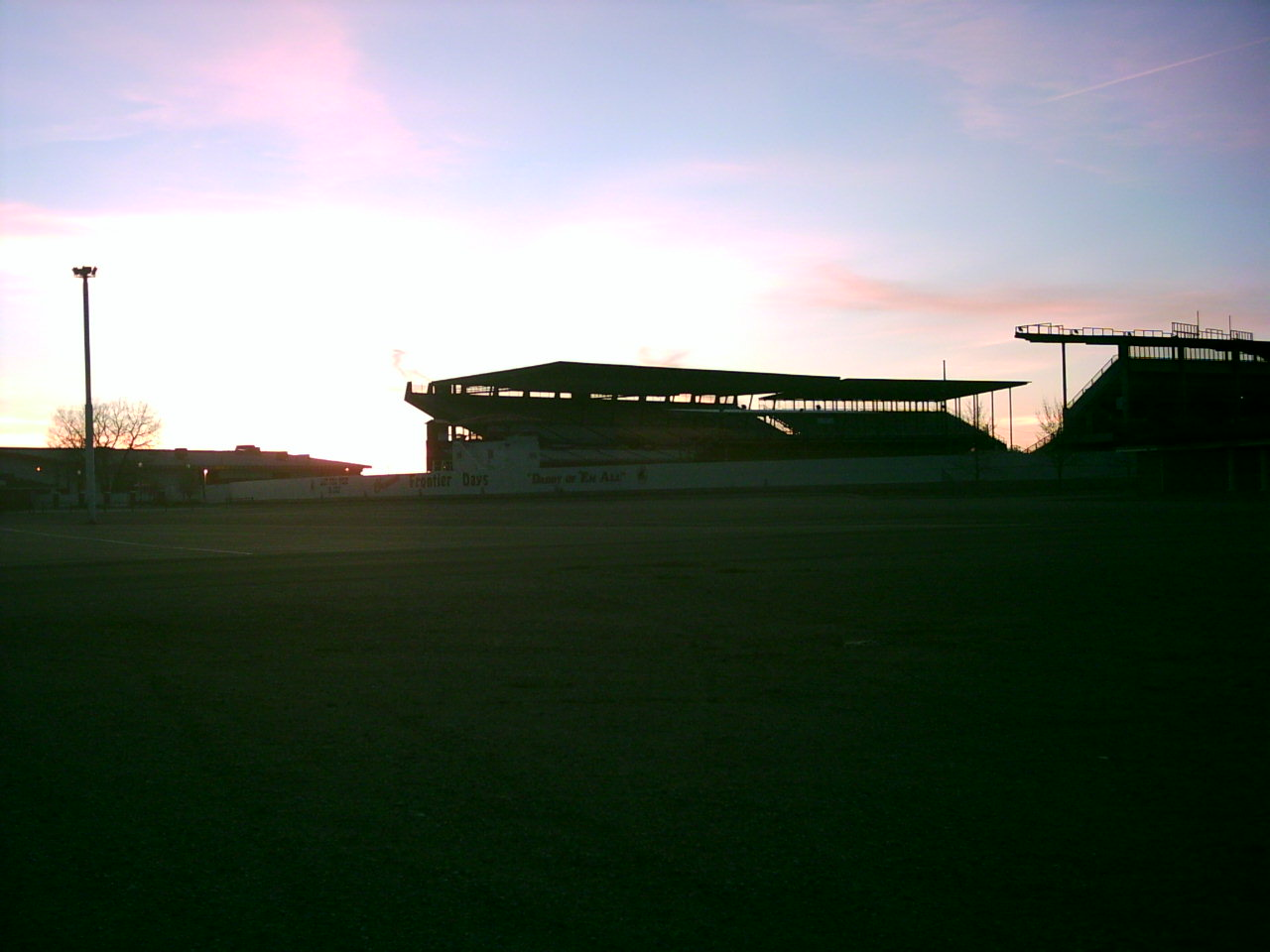
- Interactive map of Cheyenne Frontier Days Arena
- Full name: Cheyenne Frontier Days Arena
- Location: 4610 Carey Ave; Cheyenne, Wyoming
- Coordinates: 41°09′20″N 104°50′6″W
- Owner: Cheyenne Frontier Days
- Capacity: 19,000

Tenant
- Cheyenne Frontier Days Rodeo

The Cheyenne Frontier Days Arena is a 19,000-seat stadium in Cheyenne, Wyoming, United States. It annually hosts the Cheyenne Frontier Days rodeo, the evening Night Show, and in the past it hosted chuckwagon races of the Cheyenne Frontier Days.

== See also ==
- Death of Lane Frost
