= Braford =

Cattle breed

The Braford is a cross between a Hereford bull and a Brahman cow. Conversely, it can also be a cross between a Brahman bull and a Hereford cow. The makeup of the Braford is 3/8 Brahman and 5/8 Hereford. Even though a true Braford meets those standards, 1/2 Brahman and 1/2 Hereford cross are known as F1 Brafords or F1 Baldies. They carry the characteristics of both parents. The Braford is red like a Hereford with white underbelly, head, and feet; however, they can come in a brindle pattern with white faces like the hereford and these cattle are dubbed "tiger striped". Many breeders in the southern United States, Brazil, Colombia, and Latin America prefer these colored cattle due to being able to avoid cancer. It is stockier than a Hereford, though, getting the stockiness from the Brahman.

The Braford is primarily used for beef, but sometimes used for rodeo events such as calf roping, breakaway roping, muley roping and horse showing events that involve cattle such as reined (working) cow horse, cutting and ranch sorting. Brafords were developed both in Australia in 1946 and in Florida in 1947. The American Braford, was developed on Alto Adams Jr.'s St. Lucie County ranch in Florida. There are two Braford breeds, the Australian and the American.

Brafords have heat and insect resistance because of the increased number of sweat glands and oily skin inherited from their Brahman heritage. They have been known to be of an ornery disposition, though this may be due to their raising, any predisposition toward being difficult is still a subject of debate. They are often used in Rodeos due to their massive bulk and bone density, hardiness, heat endurance, and arguably their ornery disposition. They do well in warm climates though they have been raised in northern climates and seem to do well there as well, likely due to their great bulk.
