= Redding Rodeo =

Stop on the professional rodeo circuit

- Genre: Rodeo, livestock show and fair
- Dates: 14–16 May 2021
- Locations: Redding Rodeo Grounds, Redding, California, United States
- Founded: 1948
- Website: reddingrodeo.com

The Redding Rodeo is a major stop on the professional rodeo circuit that takes place in Redding, California, United States. It began in 1948 and was inducted to the ProRodeo Hall of Fame in 2016.

After being cancelled in 2020 due to the COVID-19 pandemic, the Redding Rodeo returned May 14, 2021, broadcast on The Cowboy Channel.
