= 8 Seconds =

- Theatrical release poster
- Directed by: John G. Avildsen
- Written by: Monte Merrick
- Produced by: Clyde LeVin; Danny DeVito; Tony Mark; Jeffery Swab; Michael Shamberg
- Starring: Luke Perry; Stephen Baldwin; James Rebhorn; Carrie Snodgress; Ronnie Claire Edwards; Cynthia Geary
- Cinematography: Victor Hammer
- Edited by: J. Douglas Seelig
- Music by: Bill Conti
- Production company: Jersey Films
- Distributed by: New Line Cinema
- Release date: February 25, 1994
- Running time: 105 minutes
- Country: United States
- Language: English
- Budget: $7 million
- Box office: $19.6 million

8 Seconds is a 1994 American contemporary western biographical drama film directed by John G. Avildsen. Its title refers to the length of time a bull rider is required to stay on for a ride to be scored. The film stars Luke Perry as American rodeo legend Lane Frost and focuses on his life and career as a bull riding champion. It also features Stephen Baldwin as Tuff Hedeman and Red Mitchell as Cody Lambert.

The film was completed and premiered shortly after what would have been Frost's 30th birthday, in late 1993. The film was released by New Line Cinema on February 25, 1994 to mixed reviews from critics while grossing $19.6 million against a $7 million budget.

== Plot ==
While growing up in Oklahoma, Lane Frost learns the tricks of the bull riding trade at the hand of his father Clyde, an accomplished bronc rider himself. As he grows older, Lane travels the professional rodeo circuit with his best friends Tuff Hedeman and Cody Lambert. He meets and falls in love with barrel racer Kellie Kyle and they eventually marry in 1984.

As Lane's legend and fame increase, so does the amount of pressure he puts on himself to be what everyone wants him to be and he wants to show that he is as good as they say he is. His ascent to the 1987 Professional Rodeo Cowboys Association bull riding world championship is marred by a cheating incident, questions about Kellie's devotion and a nearly-broken neck. The film also follows him through the true life series between himself and Red Rock, a bull that no cowboy had ever been able to stay on for eight seconds. It cuts the series down to three rides. In 1989, Lane is the second-to-last bull rider during the last day of that year's Cheyenne Frontier Days rodeo. He successfully rides the bull named Takin' Care of Business and dismounts but the bull turns back and hits him in the side with a horn, breaking some ribs and severing a main artery. As a result of excessive internal bleeding, Lane dies on the arena floor before he can be transported to the hospital.

The final scene shows Hedeman later that same year at the National Finals Rodeo riding for the world championship. After the eight-second bell sounds, he continues to ride and stays on an additional eight seconds as a tribute to his fallen best friend Lane, who will never be forgotten.

== Cast ==
- Luke Perry as Lane Frost
  - Cameron Finley as Young Lane Frost
- Stephen Baldwin as Tuff Hedeman
- Cynthia Geary as Kellie Kyle Frost
- James Rebhorn as Clyde Frost
- Carrie Snodgress as Elsie Frost
- Red Mitchell as Cody Lambert
- Ronnie Claire Edwards as Carolyn Kyle
- Linden Ashby as Martin Hudson
- Renée Zellweger as Buckle Bunny
- George Michael as Himself
- Brooks & Dunn as Themselves
- McBride & the Ride as Themselves
- Vince Gill as Himself
- Karla Bonoff as Herself

== Production ==
Filming took place mainly in Boerne, Texas, Del Rio, Texas, Tucson Rodeo Grounds, San Antonio, Pendleton, Oregon and a handful of other minor locations.

== Release ==
8 Seconds was released in the United States on February 25, 1994. In the Philippines, the film was released on September 8, 1994, with free Luke Perry handkerchiefs handed out to moviegoers who present the film's newspaper ad at the lobby of any theater; the film was promoted as being the first American film to be given by the Movie and Television Review and Classification Board (MTRCB) an "Excellent" rating.

=== Critical response ===
The film gained a mixed reception. The Milwaukee Journal Sentinel praised Perry's acting but criticized the performance of Cynthia Geary, who played Kellie Kyle Frost. It holds a 36% rating from Rotten Tomatoes based on 14 reviews.

== See also ==
- List of films about horses
