= Red Rock (bull) =

American bucking bull (1976-1994)

- Red Rock with Lane Frost
- Breed: Braford
- Sex: Bull
- Born: January 1, 1976; Burns, Oregon, U.S.
- Died: June 8, 1994 (aged 18); Red Bluff, California, U.S.
- Nationality: United States
- Years active: 1978 - 1988
- Owner: Growney Brothers Rodeo Company
- Weight: 1750 lb (790 kg)
- Appearance: Red Brindle
- Awards: 1987 PRCA Bucking Bull of the Year

Red Rock #007 (January 1, 1976 – June 8, 1994) was an American bucking bull. He competed in the Professional Rodeo Cowboys Association (PRCA) circuit. Bull riders attempted to ride Red Rock 309 times and not one rider was able to ride him until the eight-second whistle in his professional career. His owners brought Red Rock out of retirement in 1988 for a match against Lane Frost. He was also chosen as the PRCA 1987 Bucking Bull of the Year. However, Red Rock is most famous for his association with 1987 PRCA World Champion bull rider Lane Frost and their famous matchup called the Challenge of the Champions. In 1990, both Frost and Red Rock were inducted into the ProRodeo Hall of Fame. In 1994, Hollywood released 8 Seconds, a biopic based on Lane Frost's life, which includes his duel with Red Rock. He was the first livestock inducted into the St. Paul Rodeo Hall of Fame in 2017.

== Background ==
Red Rock was born in 1976 at the Burnt River Ranch in Burns, Oregon. When he was a small calf, his mother died. Red Rock was introduced to the family milk cow along with another orphan calf. She raised them together in the backyard of the family's home. He was a red, tiger striped brindle Brahma-Hereford crossbred. This is also known as a Braford. "He was named after a rock formation near the ranch." He weighed 1,750 pounds (790 kg) at his prime. Red Rock was a grandfather of the historic bull named Wolfman. Wolfman's other grandfather was Oscar. Wolfman is known for being ridden by Wade Leslie for a perfect 100 point score, the only one in history in any rodeo circuit. This happened in 1991 in Central Point, Oregon, and it greatly enhanced owner Growney Brothers with most of the credit going to Don Kish.

== Bucking career ==
=== Early Days ===
When Red Rock was two years old, Mert Hunking from Sisters, Oregon, bought him. Mert was a local stock contractor in the International Professional Rodeo Association (IPRA), and he bucked Red Rock in the rodeos in the region. Mert ran a local stock contractor company called Sombrero Rodeo Company. Mert could see that Red Rock was smarter than the typical bull: "somehow, he could sense just what a bullrider was going to do, and he would go the opposite way, throwing cowboys off, usually on the first turn out of the chute. And, unlike the other bulls, Red Rock wouldn't go after the bullrider, he would just turn around and head for the stripping chute". Red Rock spent his time bucking all of the riders off.

"Nobody knew the bull then." Kish said. When he was 18 years old, Don Kish drew Red Rock at a rodeo in Silver Lake, Oregon. He only lasted a couple jumps before being bucked off so hard he needed help finding his way back towards the chute. Mert took Red Rock to the World's Toughest Rodeo in Tacoma, Washington, in 1982. Jody Tatone drew him which started the cowboys talking about him. Red Rock won many awards in this time and was named Bucking Bull of the Finals in the IPRA in 1983. In 1983, Mert was allowed to put Red Rock in the draw for a PRCA rodeo. Two top PRCA riders drew him and Red Rock bucked them both off. After that, Mert knew Red Rock could buck at the PRCA level. When Mert developed terminal cancer in 1984, he contacted John Growney of Growney Brothers Rodeo Company in Red Bluff, California. He was looking for someone special to take care of Red Rock. Mert had received many offers for Red Rock. However, he had heard that Growney and his partner, Don Kish, had a reputation for taking outstanding care of their livestock. Mert even financed the bull so that the guys could afford to buy him. Growney said Mert would never had sold Red Rock if he hadn't been dying. When Kish and Growney were looking over the stock Mert was selling, they "recognized Red Rock immediately [and] bought him that day in early 1984 for $10,000".

=== PRCA ===
Red Rock with his owner, John Growney

At eight years old, in 1984, Red Rock started his career in the PRCA. Usually, bulls are starting to retire at this age. At this time, the PRCA was the highest level of bull riding in the world. Every year from 1984 to 1987 Red Rock bucked his way into the National Finals Rodeo (NFR), where the cowboys won their world championships. Even though he threw every rider before the whistle, the bull riders liked to draw him because he never tried to "hook" them with his horn and he avoided stepping on them. The bull riders thought if they did get a ride on him, it would be a very high score. Sometimes he took victory laps around the arena after he threw off a rider.

From 1984 to 1987, Red Rock bucked off the best riders at the NFR every year. At the 1984 NFR, he bucked off 1982 World Champion Charlie Sampson and 1983 World Champion Cody Snyder. At the 1985 NFR he bucked off both Gary Toole and 1987 World Champion Lane Frost. At the 1986 NFR he bucked off Lane Frost again as well as 1985 World Champion Ted Nuce. At the 1986 NFR, Lane would have been the first cowboy to ride all 10 of his finals bulls—except that Red Rock bucked him off. This also kept Frost from winning the 1986 World Championship. Instead, Tuff Hedeman won the championship; Hedeman also won in 1989 and 1991. At the 1987 NFR, Red Rock bucked off Gary Toole again. And also in 1987, for his last competitive ride, he bucked off Cody Custer. In 1987 Red Rock became the Bucking Bull of the Year. Lane Frost happened to become the 1987 World Champion Bull Rider at the same NFR.

"Every bull rider wanted a chance to try Red Rock because he was a great bucking bull and because they knew he wouldn't come after them," Growney said in a 1987 interview with the Las Vegas-Review-Journal, "He won't step on bull riders or hook them once they're off, like most bulls...He has so much character in him. He has all the character of well-mannered person. At the ranch, we put kids on his back. He's a friend, a good soul." "A phenomenal bull!" Ted Nuce was quoted as saying in 1987. "Loves to buck cowboys off. He's smart. Knows what hand a guy's got down on his back. More than likely he won't turn back into a guy's hand. He's gonna set you up and get you loose before he goes to spinning."

Prior to the 1987 NFR, the best cowboys were talking about Red Rock, who had just been announced as the 1987 PRCA Bull of the Year. The bull had 307 outs (trips out of the bucking chute) with no qualified rides by anyone. Red Rock was to be drawn only two more times in Las Vegas at his final NFR in December 1987. Red Rock was age 11, considered old for a bull to still be bucking, and was likely to go down in history as the only undefeated bull in the PRCA. Lane Frost said he didn't want to draw him if he would be in a slot that could keep him from winning the World Champion title again, but otherwise he would have loved to draw him. Cody Lambert said he would have liked one more time "unconditionally". "If they'd let me get on him today for nothing, I'd get on him," said Lambert, who had lasted six seconds on his last attempt. "But I got too excited. I've had two fair chances at him, and I needed help getting up both times." Kish says "He's strong, he's fast, and he's smart. There are stronger, faster, smarter bulls than Red Rock, but he has the combination." "Lane and I have had him twice and Tuff has had him once," Lambert said. "All three of us had to tape our wrists for a month after we rode him, and he bucked a different pattern every time. Red Rock intimidates a guy because he's so ready. He gets hard as a rock in that chute. It's like sitting on a brick. Then he throws people off so hard they break bones when they land." Frost had been bucked off by Red Rock at the 1985 NFR and the 1986 NFR.

John said he and Don felt Red Rock deserved to retire and enjoy himself after the 1987 NFR after so many years bucking and because of his age. They also decided it was time to breed Red Rock, which had been what they had in mind when they bought him. John Growney said "We had no idea that he was quite this caliber a bull when we bought him." "Of course I'd like another shot at him," Lambert said. "But I also think he'll never get the recognition he deserves unless someone does ride him. As of now, no one knows his limits." Lane, also, would also love to "ride the invincible bull". "It'd be the thrill of anyone's bull riding career," he said. "Like when Freckles Brown rode Tornado."

Gary Toole drew Red Rock first at the 1987 NFR and got bucked off. Cody Custer drew him for the second and final ride at the NFR, was bucked off hard and had to be helped up. And those were Red Rock's final two rides in his PRCA rodeo career, retiring unridden after 309 attempts in professional rodeos, bucking first with Mert Hunking and then in the PRCA. At that time, Red Rock was 11 years old.

== Challenge of the Champions ==
The Challenge of the Champions hadn't even been dreamed up at the time of Red Rock's retirement. Sometime in 1988, John Growney thought of a special match-up between the two 1987 Champions. It was decided that Lane and Red Rock would have 7 showdowns at different rodeos in states across the West. The event was titled the "Challenge of the Champions." Red Rock was brought out of retirement and Lane Frost finally rode him to the eight-second whistle for a scoring ride for 4 of the 7 matches.

== Retirement and death ==
In 1989, Lane Frost was competing in Cheyenne Frontier Days in July, the oldest and biggest outdoor rodeo in the world. He had just dismounted after a successful ride on the bull Takin' Care of Business. He landed down on his hands and knees in the mud. The bull turned and knocked him prone, then hit him with his right horn in the back as he lay on the ground. It broke some ribs and "it is assumed that the broken ribs severed a main artery". He died in the arena. After Lane's death, John decided that no other bull rider would ever sit astride Red Rock. Red Rock would stay retired from the PRCA. However, John continued to let people visit Red Rock since he was so friendly and gentle, and even more famous after the Challenge of the Champions. John also took Red Rock to Lane's memorial service during the 1989 NFR in Las Vegas.

The ProRodeo Hall of Fame simultaneously inducted both Lane and Red Rock the same year, in 1990, and John brought Red Rock to the induction ceremonies. At the time, Red Rock was only the third bull inducted since the hall opened in 1979. As of 2018, there were only seven bulls inducted.

On June 8, 1994, Red Rock suffered a stroke while living out his retirement on the Growney ranch in Red Bluff, California. He "died while the vet was attending to him". He was 18 years old. John buried him under an oak tree on the ranch in Red Bluff. Clyde Frost, Lane's father, commented "He was a great bull and he had a great life. I know he's in a better place now...but he had it pretty good here too."

== Honors and recognition ==
- Years selected to the NFR 1984, 1985, 1986, 1987
- Placed in the Bucking Bull of the Finals every year
- NFR- 2nd Place Bucking Bull of the Finals 1984
- NFR- 3rd Place Bucking Bull of the Finals 1985
- NFR- 1st Place Bucking Bull of the Finals 1986
- NFR- 2nd Place Bucking Bull of the Finals 1987
- Voted the Reserve Bucking Bull of the Year in 1984, 1985, and 1986 by the stock contractors at the NFR -Reserve=2nd place
- 1987 PRCA Bucking Bull of the Year
- Unridden in 309 rides, only bucking bull to remain unridden in his career in the PRCA
- Faced Lane Frost in the Challenge of the Champions
- Inducted into the ProRodeo Hall of Fame in 1990
- In 1994, Hollywood made a feature film entitled 8 Seconds based on Lane Frost's life, which included the Challenge of the Champions with Red Rock.
- Bronze statue of Lane Frost riding Red Rock during the Challenge of the Champions held at the Clovis Rodeo. Installed April 2014.
- First livestock inducted into the St. Paul Rodeo Hall of Fame in 2017
- In 2021, inducted into the Bull Riding Hall of Fame

== Tributes ==
1. DVD of the Challenge of the Champions True story documentary made in 2009
2. 1:20 scale version collectible figures of Lane and Red Rock by Farm and Ranch Toys
3. Tehama Oaks - Our Wild West Blend honors World Champion Bucking Bull "Red Rock"
4. "Red Rock" Video - by the Smokin' Armadillos Tribute to Lane Frost & Red Rock includes real footage of them
5. "Red Rock" lyrics Tribute Song by the Smokin' Armadillos
