= Douradina, Paraná =

Douradina
- Municipality
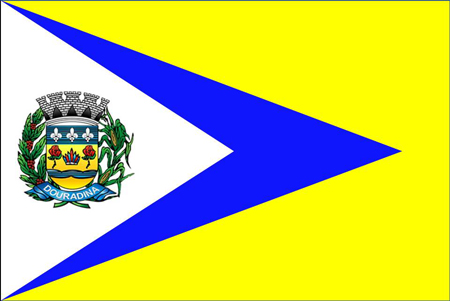
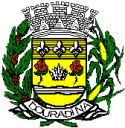
- Flag Coat of arms

- Location in Brazil
- Coordinates: 23°22′51″S 53°17′31″W
- Country: Brazil
- Region: Southern Region
- State: Paraná
- Mesoregion: Noroeste Paranaense

Population (2020)
  - Total: 8,869
- Time zone: UTC−3 (BRT)

Douradina is a municipality in the state of Paraná in the Southern Region of Brazil. The population is 8,869.
