= Livermore Rodeo =

Annual rodeo in California

The logo of the Livermore Rodeo

The Livermore Rodeo is a rodeo held annually in Livermore, California, United States, on the second full weekend of June at the rodeo grounds at Robertson Park. It is the oldest event in Livermore and part of the famous California 6-Pack Rodeo Circuit. It is sanctioned by the Professional Rodeo Cowboys Association (PRCA). Rodeo participants frequent the event and it is often used as a backdrop or exteriors site in films. It is always preceded by the Rodeo parade through the Livermore Downtown area on Saturday morning of the rodeo weekend, and has had concerts by Country and Western musicians, including Mark Chesnutt in 2005. The Rodeo Association also hosts a Family Night during Rodeo week and a Volunteer Appreciation party after the rodeo is over. It is advertised as the "world's fastest rodeo".

== History ==
During World War I, in 1918, the Red Cross was in dire needs of funds, so California cities and towns were assessed $1,200 each as a way of generating the needed money. John McGlinchey, who was president of the Livermore Stockman's Protective Association at the time, conceived the idea of holding a fund-raiser in the form of a rodeo to raise the money. A committee was appointed by McGlinchey to organise the rodeo, which was held the first time on a portion of a local ranch near the intersection of what is now Interstate 580 and Portola Avenue. The opening event was filmed by Universal Studios for a newsreel.

There was no rodeo from 1942 through 1945 due to World War II, nor in 2020 and 2021 due to the COVID-19 pandemic.

In 2025, the rodeo was inducted into the ProRodeo Hall of Fame.
