= St. Paul Rodeo =

Fourth of July Rodeo

- Genre: rodeo
- Dates: June 30 - July 4
- Frequency: annual
- Locations: St. Paul, Oregon, United States
- Years active: 87
- Inaugurated: 1936
- Website: www.stpaulrodeo.com

The St. Paul Rodeo is held annually in St. Paul, Oregon, United States. It takes place over five days, ending on July 4th. Events include nightly rodeo and fireworks, carnival and vendors, music performances, and a parade on July 4th.

The event was first held in 1936. The total five-day attendance as of 2022 was about 75,000. The grandstands seating capacity is 10,500 which was sold out in 2023.

The rodeo is sanctioned by the Professional Rodeo Cowboys Association (PRCA).

In 2023, the rodeo was inducted into the ProRodeo Hall of Fame.
