= Livestock show =

Event where livestock are exhibited and judged on certain phenotypical breed traits

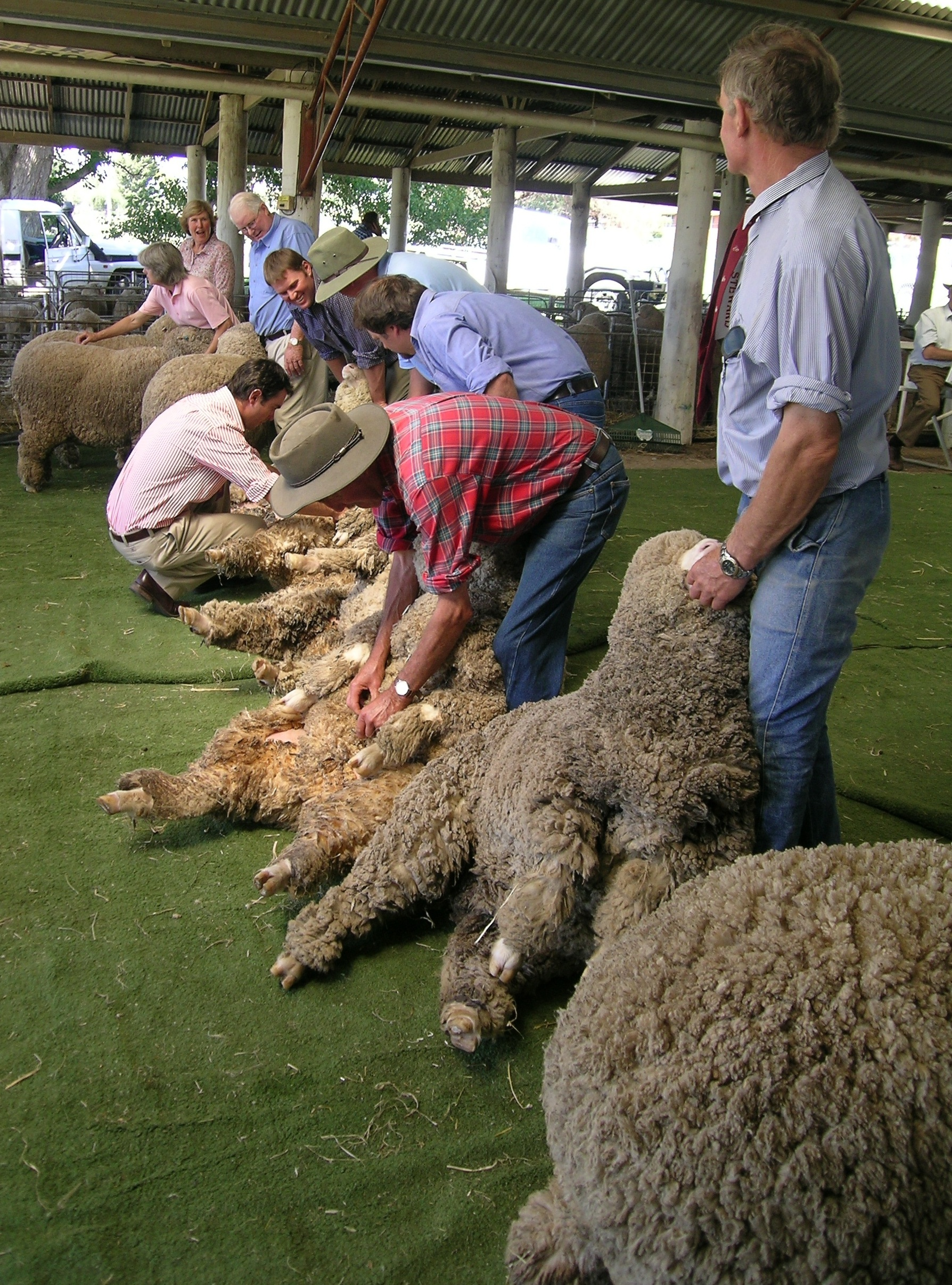
Merino ewes being judged in New South Wales

A livestock show is an event where livestock are exhibited and judged on certain phenotypical breed traits as specified by their respective breed standard. Species of livestock that may be shown include pigs, cattle, sheep, goats, horses, llamas and alpacas. Poultry such as chickens, geese, ducks, turkeys and pigeons are also shown competitively. Animals may be judged on structural correctness, muscle expression, breeding potential, wool quality, and behavior.
