= Lane Frost =

American bull rider (1963–1989)

- Frost at a rodeo event

Personal information
- Full name: Lane Clyde Frost
- Born: October 12, 1963 La Junta, Colorado, U.S.
- Died: July 30, 1989 (aged 25) Cheyenne, Wyoming, U.S.
- Cause of death: Bull riding accident
- Resting place: Mount Olivet Cemetery; Hugo, Oklahoma, U.S.
- Home town: Lane, Oklahoma, U.S.
- Height: 5 ft 11 in (180 cm)
- Weight: 140 lb (64 kg)
- Spouse: Kellie Kyle (m. 1985)

Sport
- Sport: Rodeo
- Handedness: Left
- Event: Bull riding
- Circuit: PRCA
- Turned pro: 1982
- Coached by: Warren G. Brown (mentor)

Achievements and titles
- Highest world ranking: 1st (1987)
Medal record
Bull riding
Representing United States
Rodeo '88 Challenge Cup
Gold medal – first place	1988 Calgary	Team
Bronze medal – third place	1988 Calgary	Individual

Lane Clyde Frost (October 12, 1963 – July 30, 1989) was an American professional rodeo cowboy who specialized in bull riding, and competed in the Professional Rodeo Cowboys Association (PRCA). He was the 1987 PRCA World Champion bull rider. He was also the only rider ever to score a qualified ride on Red Rock, the 1987 PRCA Bucking Bull of the Year.

== Early life ==
At the time of Lane's birth, his parents lived in Lapoint, Utah. His father, Clyde, was on the rodeo circuit as a saddle bronc and bareback rider. His mother, Elsie, went to stay with her parents in Kim, Colorado, and he was born in the hospital in La Junta. He had an older sister, Robin, and a younger brother, Cody.

Frost started riding dairy calves around age 5–6. His first rodeo awards were won when he was 10, at the "Little Buckaroos" Rodeos held in Uintah Basin: first in bareback, second in calf roping, and third in the "bull riding" (calf riding) event. He also competed in wrestling in junior high school. The family then moved to Oklahoma and he attended Atoka High School in Atoka. In Oklahoma, he was the National High School Bull Riding Champion in 1981. He was the Bull Riding Champion of the first Youth National Finals in Fort Worth, Texas, in 1982.

On January 5, 1985, Frost married Kellie Kyle (born 1965), a barrel racer from Quanah, Texas, west of Wichita Falls.

== Career ==
Frost joined the PRCA and began riding full-time after graduating from high school in 1982. In 1984, he qualified for his first National Finals Rodeo (NFR). In 1986, he won the NFR bull riding average title. In 1987, he became the PRCA World Champion bull rider at the NFR at age 24. He went on to compete at the Rodeo '88 Challenge Cup held as part of the Cultural Olympiad in association with the 1988 Winter Olympics in Calgary. In his lifetime, Frost made it to the NFR for five consecutive years from 1984 to 1988.

=== Challenge of the Champions ===
Sometime in 1988, John Growney, Red Rock's owner, pondered a special competition between the two 1987 champions. Red Rock had never been successfully ridden during his four-year professional career, despite rodeo cowboys making 309 attempts to ride him. It was decided that Frost and Red Rock would have seven showdowns at different rodeos in states across the West. The event was titled the "Challenge of the Champions." Red Rock was brought out of retirement and Frost rode him to the eight-second whistle for a scoring ride for four of the seven matches.

== Death ==
On July 30, 1989, at Cheyenne Frontier Days in Cheyenne, Wyoming, after completing a successful 85-point ride on a Brahma bull named Takin' Care of Business, who Bad Company Rodeo owned, Frost dismounted and landed in the mud. The bull then turned, knocked Frost over, pressed his right horn on Frost's back, and pushed him against the muddy arena floor. Frost initially rose to his feet, took a couple of steps, waved for help, and then fell to the ground; dying on the arena floor from massive internal injuries. He was 25 years old. No autopsy was performed. He posthumously finished third in the event. It was assumed that when Takin' Care of Business pushed Frost against the mud, the bull's entire body weight was at the end of his horn, breaking some of Frost's ribs, of which then severed a main artery. Had he lived, he would have made it to his sixth consecutive NFR.

Frost's funeral service was held on August 2, 1989, at the First Baptist Church in Atoka, Oklahoma. An estimated 3,500 people attended. He was buried near his hero and mentor, Freckles Brown, in Mount Olivet Cemetery in Hugo, Oklahoma.

Takin' Care of Business had previously appeared at the NFR. He would go on to appear at the 1989 NFR and his last career outing was at the 1990 NFR. He was then retired and put out to stud until he died in 1999.

== Legacy ==
Frost's best friend and traveling partner Tuff Hedeman won his second PRCA bull riding world championship at the NFR in 1989. He successfully rode his last bull for the full eight seconds, and rode him an additional eight seconds in memory of Frost.

After Frost's death, Cody Lambert, another one of his friends and traveling partners, created the protective vest that professional cowboys now wear when riding bulls. Later, in 1996, the Professional Bull Riders (PBR) made protective vests mandatory, and subsequently all bull riding organizations did as well.

In 1994, the biopic based on Frost's life, 8 Seconds, was released. Luke Perry played the role of Frost, Stephen Baldwin as Tuff Hedeman, and Cynthia Geary as Kellie Frost.

Since 1996, the PBR has awarded the Lane Frost/Brent Thurman Award; presented to the bull rider who scores the highest-marked single ride at the PBR World Finals. It was named for Frost and Brent Thurman, who died six days after suffering serious injuries at the 1994 National Finals Rodeo. The Lane Frost Health and Rehabilitation Center in Hugo is dedicated to his memory.

Country music star Garth Brooks paid tribute to Frost in the video for his 1990 hit single "The Dance". Rodeo announcer Randy Schmutz wrote the song "A Smile Like That" about him. The 1993 song "Red Rock" by the Smokin' Armadillos is about Frost, and he is mentioned at the end of the video for Korn's 2007 song "Hold On". Aaron Watson's 2012 album, Real Good Time, included the single "July in Cheyenne". Kings of Leon's 2013 music video for "Beautiful War" pays homage to Frost. In 1994, Billy Dean wrote and sang "Once in a While" which appears on the 8 Seconds soundtrack.

Frost's parents have authorized Cowboy Bible: The Living New Testament, with a sketch of him on the cover. A documentary titled "The Challenge of the Champions: The Story of Lane Frost and Red Rock" premiered in 2008. It covers the match between them.

After surviving an accident on the last lap of the 2015 Coke Zero 400 at Daytona International Speedway, NASCAR Cup Series driver Austin Dillon waved to the crowd with a similar gesture to that of Frost's; he later stated that it was in tribute to Frost.

A 2023, the documentary Lane: Life | Legend | Legacy premiered, interviewing Frost's parents, Kellie, Hedeman, Lambert, and others close to him. It also included those inspired by him, such as Cody Johnson and Lane Johnson.

American bull rider J.W. Hart idolized Frost. He attended Frost's bull riding school as a child and also befriended him. During the first few years of his professional career in the mid-1990s, while competing in the PBR and PRCA, Hart rode in a pair of pink chaps that were once owned by Frost. In 2024, Brazilian bull rider Cássio Dias, who also idolizes Frost, won the PBR world championship while riding in those same chaps, which were gifted to him by Hart.

Frost's cousin Shane Frost is a former professional bull rider himself. Shane's sons are Joe and Josh Frost, who started their professional bull-riding careers in the 2010s. Both have qualified for the National Finals Rodeo and PBR World Finals. Joe retired in 2021 after a series of injuries which resulted in blood clots. In 2024, his younger brother Josh won the PRCA bull riding world championship. They both now run the Frost Legacy bull riding school in Randlett, Utah.

== Honors ==
- 1990 ProRodeo Hall of Fame
- 1999 PBR Ring of Honor
- 2000 Texas Cowboy Hall of Fame
- 2008 Rodeo Hall of Fame of the National Cowboy & Western Heritage Museum
- 2003 Cheyenne Frontier Days Hall of Fame
- 2017 Bull Riding Hall of Fame
- 2017 Molalla Walk of Fame
- 2025 Texas Trail of Fame
