= Cheyenne Frontier Days =

Annual festival in Cheyenne, Wyoming

Coordinates: 41.155°N 104.835°W

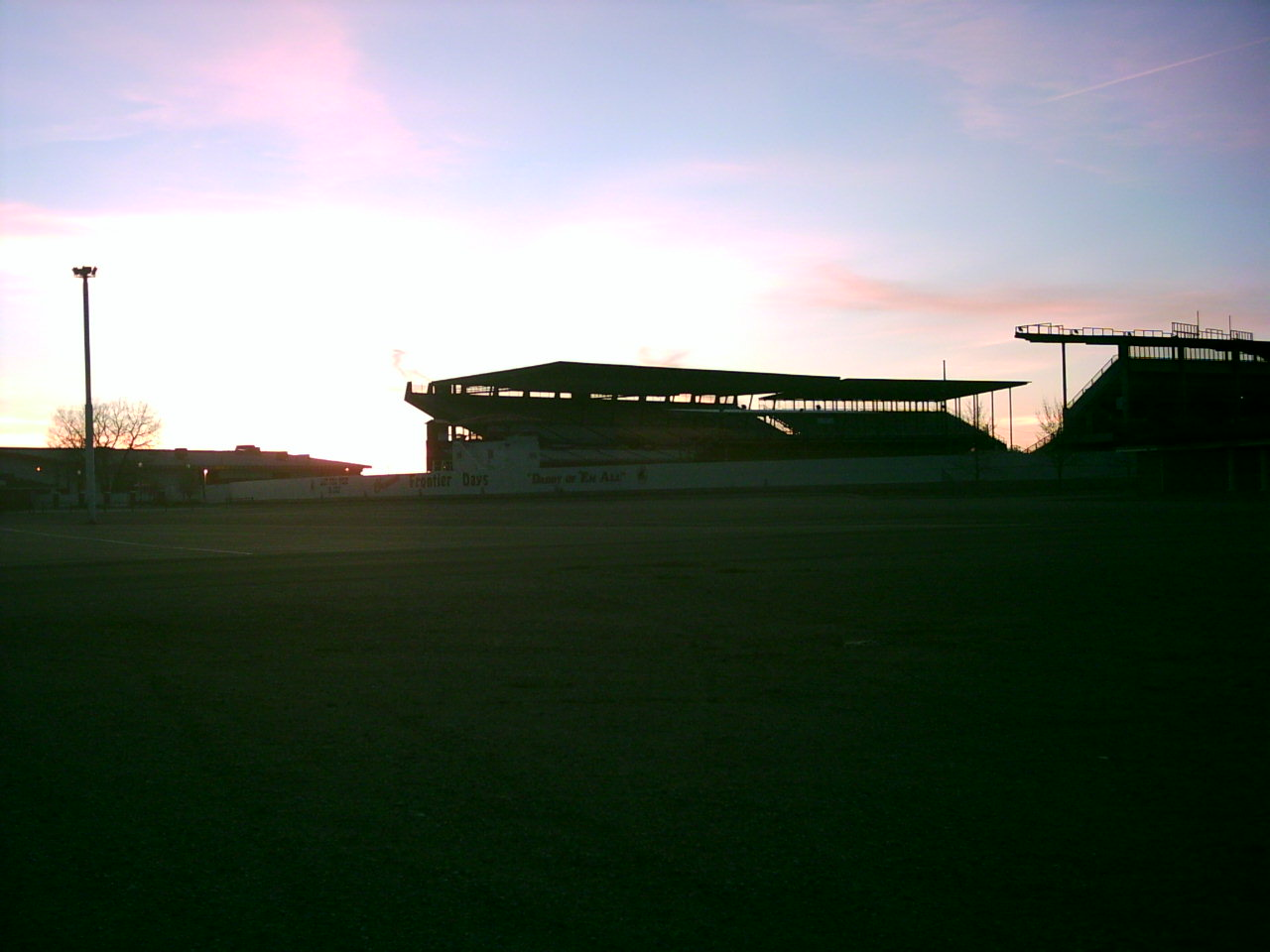
Frontier Park

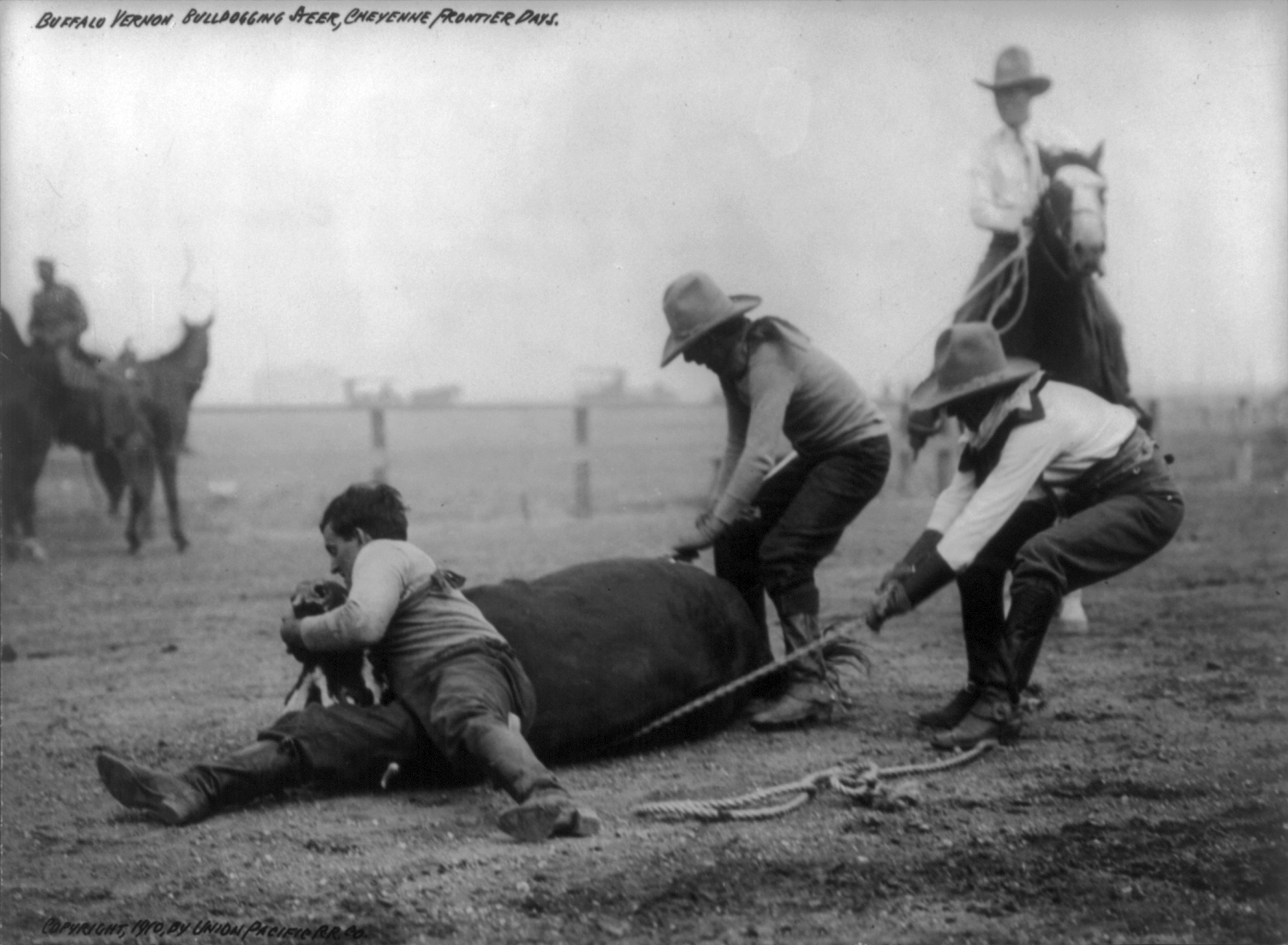
"Buffalo" Vernon (left) bulldogging a steer, 1910

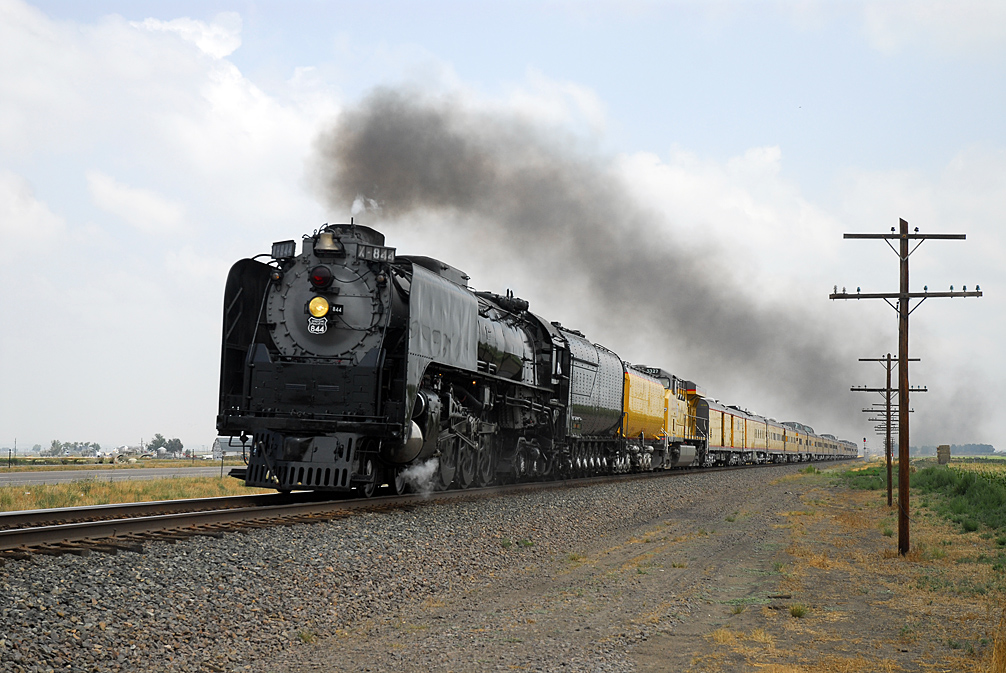
Union Pacific 844 leads the Cheyenne Frontier Days Special near Platteville, Colorado in 2007.

Cheyenne Frontier Days is an outdoor rodeo and western celebration in the United States, held annually since 1897 in Cheyenne, Wyoming. It bills itself as the "World's Largest Outdoor Rodeo and Western Celebration." The event, claimed to be one of the largest of its kind in the world, draws nearly 200,000 annually. Lodging fills up quickly during the peak tourist season throughout southern and eastern Wyoming, into northern Colorado and western Nebraska. The celebration is held during the ten days centered about the last full week of July. In 2008, Cheyenne Frontier Days was inducted into the ProRodeo Hall of Fame.

== Background ==
The rodeo draws visitors from different parts of the United States as well as internationally. These visitors generally stay in hotels, motels, or in recreational vehicles. High temperatures around 81 °F (27 °C) and fair weather are normal for the time of year when this event is held; the elevation is approximately 6,150 feet (1,870 m) above sea level.

Cowboy style bars and country and western themed establishments scattered throughout the city of Cheyenne are popular with many rodeo fans and participants, and they file in with large numbers after the night shows.

== Overview ==
Prior to the annual kickoff of Cheyenne Frontier Days on a Friday, the annual Cattle Drive is held on the preceding Sunday morning. This event, which attracts considerable attention, is inspired by the cattle drives of the Old West. In 2013, 447 steers, herded by mounted cowboys, walked three miles from Hynds Boulevard into Frontier Park. In 2015, 550 steers walked this route. It starts from a pasture north of the city and runs along Interstate 25, south and then through the city streets aforementioned into the park.

Cheyenne Frontier Days has a full-time staff of 18 people year round, and an estimated 3,000 volunteers, of whom a small number are paid. There is preparation before the event and cleanup after the event as well as all of the work that needs performed during the actual event.

== Rodeo ==
=== PRCA ProRodeo ===
Cheyenne Frontier Days runs ten days with more sections of bull riding, saddle and bareback bronc riding than any other rodeo. The rodeo is also known for its large number of participants. All events are performed each day. The rodeo draws many of the sport's top competitors due to its more than $1 million in cash and prizes available.

Frontier Days delivers three types of competition: roughstock events, timed events, and racing on the track. Roughstock events include bull riding, bareback bronc riding, saddle bronc riding, rookie saddle bronc riding, and women's ranch bronc riding. Timed events include steer wrestling, team roping, tie-down roping, and women's breakaway roping & barrel racing. Tie-down roping includes calf roping, steer roping, and senior steer roping. Some of the timed events are shown during slack. After all of the events are concluded, there is an all-around champion winner.

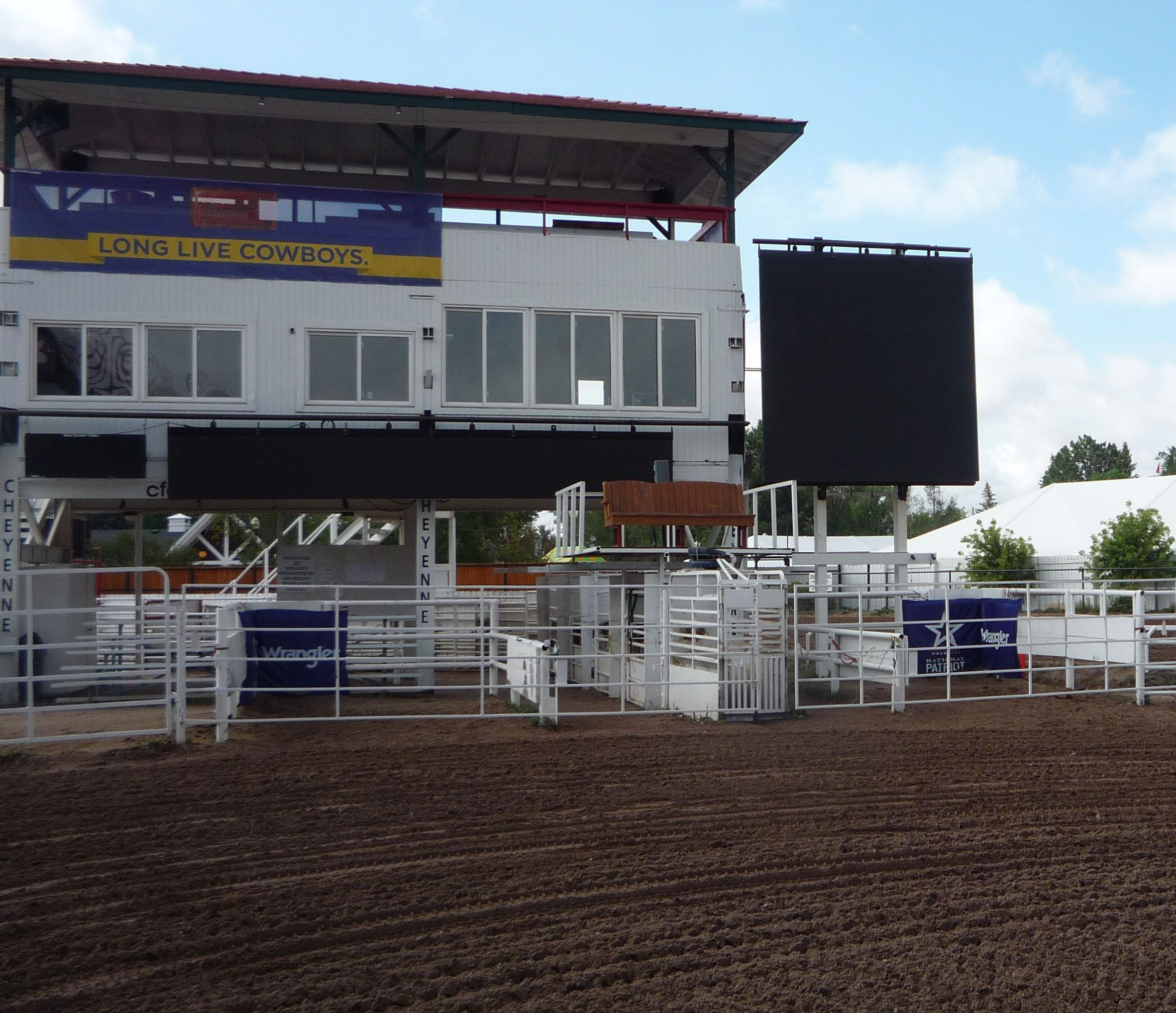
Chute 9 at Cheyenne Frontier Days for timed events

There are also a few other select events which include saddle bronc futurity, trick riding, the wild horse race, and the dinner bell derby.

In 2014, Cheyenne Frontier Days received the Professional Rodeo Cowboys Association (PRCA) Large Outdoor Rodeo of the Year award for the 16th total and 11th consecutive time.

=== PRCA Xtreme Bulls ===
Since 2001, Cheyenne Frontier Days has hosted a two-day all-bull riding event as part of its Frontier Nights activities. Said event has been sanctioned by different organizations throughout the years.

Since 2025, the event has been sanctioned by the PRCA as part of its Xtreme Bulls tour. It is a Division I event; the top level that the Xtreme Bulls tour has to offer.

=== Previous tours ===
==== Cinch Rodeo Shootout ====
From 2014 through 2017, the opening rodeo performance at Cheyenne Frontier Days was the Cinch Rodeo Shootout. The Cinch Jeans company was the event's title sponsor. It featured 40 contestants competing in five different rodeo events for one afternoon. The five events were bareback bronc riding, steer wrestling, saddle bronc riding, barrel racing, and bull riding. Participation by the contestants was by invitation. At the end, there was one winner for each event. There was also a team format. In 2014 and 2015, teams were composed of the previous year's champions of the eight largest regular-season rodeos in North America, including Cheyenne Frontier Days. In 2016 and 2017, teams represented a local business and winnings were donated to charity. Both the individual and team format was an elimination style contest.

==== PBR Challenger Tour / Touring Pro Division ====
The first minor league tour of the Professional Bull Riders (PBR), the Challenger Tour, had an event at Cheyenne Frontier Days for several years. It started in 2001 and ran through 2010, until returning in 2018. The tour made its debut in 1995 as the Touring Pro Division, was renamed the Challenger Tour in 2001, and was changed back to its original title of the Touring Pro Division in 2010.

==== Championship Bull Riding ====
In 2011, the all-bull riding event at Cheyenne Frontier Days became a regular-season event for Championship Bull Riding (CBR). Then from 2012 through 2018, it was the World Finals event for said organization. In 2018, the annual bull-riding event at Cheyenne Frontier Days was sanctioned by two different organizations; the first day was the PBR Touring Pro Division event, and the second day was the 2018 CBR World Finals. The latter competition, though a CBR event, was produced by the PBR, and CBR went out of business after its 2018 World Finals event had concluded.

==== PBR Premier Series ====
In 2019, the PBR brought the Unleash the Beast Series (UTB) Last Cowboy Standing event to Cheyenne. The event would have taken place in 2020, but was cancelled, along with the entire Cheyenne Frontier Days festival because of COVID-19 restrictions. However, it all returned in 2021.

==== PBR Team Series ====
In 2022 and 2023, Cheyenne was the first stop of the PBR's Team Series, where teams of bull riders representing different regions of the United States ride against each other throughout the summer and autumn to culminate at the Team Series Championship at T-Mobile Arena in Las Vegas, Nevada. While most of the regular season events take place in the teams' home cities, two "neutral site" events are included on the schedule. Cheyenne was one of them.

==== PBR Challenger Series ====
The Challenger Series is the only PBR tour in the United States since 2022 that takes place during the PBR Team Series season (summer and autumn) where riders compete as individuals. The Last Cowboy Standing, which was previously held at Cheyenne as a stop on the PBR's elite Unleash the Beast Series (UTB) was held as a Challenger Series event in 2024.

== Events ==
Cheyenne Frontier Days features nightly concerts by popular music and comedy acts, a midway, a fair with rides, games, and food vendors, wild west shows featuring Western riding, an Indian village, and a large PRCA nationally-sanctioned rodeo. A common moniker for the event is "The Daddy of 'em All®", based on its long history and the fact that the rodeo is billed as the largest such event in the world. The rodeo and the majority of the events are centered on the property of Frontier Park, but some of the events such as the pancake breakfasts are held in a different part of the city.

=== Pancake Breakfasts ===
Three free pancake breakfasts are served each year which are sponsored by the local Kiwanis chapter. They are held every Monday, Wednesday, and Friday with close to 40,000 people taking advantage of this every year. The record for a daily breakfast is 39,111 people set in 1996. In one week, over 100,000 pancakes are served, along with over 3,000 pounds of ham. This event was started in 1952 by the Cheyenne Frontier Committee. The food is cooked on military ranges. The event takes place at the historic Cheyenne Depot Square.

There were none served in 2020.

=== Grand Parade ===
On the days in between the free pancake breakfasts, the city of Cheyenne hosts the Grand Parade in the morning. The parade starts at the Wyoming State Capitol, goes down to the Cheyenne Depot Square, and then returns to the Wyoming State Capitol on an alternate street. Until 1925, with two exceptions, the Frontier Days parades were rowdy affairs. In 1926, upon request, Dazee Bristol created floats which are still in use today. The parade is now composed of floats, automobiles, horse-drawn antique carriages, riders in period dress, and top marching bands.

=== Indian Village ===
In 1898, shortly after the second Frontier Days occurred, the committee extended an invitation to Native American performers to participate in following Frontier Days. Since then, they have participated every year. One popular attraction is the Native American Village which is open throughout Frontier Days and is free. Historically, the visiting performers shifted their campground around until in the 1960s when the committee established a permanent campground, the "Indian Village." The Indian Village hosts authentic dancing, music, storytelling, and pow-wows. There are also exhibit booths and food vendors.

=== Behind the Chutes tour ===
Behind the Chutes tours are free. There are 1–3 tours every day of Frontier Days. The tour follows the same path that the bucking broncs and bulls take from the pens behind the arena. The tour shows where the livestock is kept and rounded up. Then the tour follows where livestock go through gates to the chutes. Then it is out into the arena and the tour is finished by walking across the arena. Depending on what time the tour is taken, there might be livestock in the pens.

=== Chuckwagon Cookoff ===
Authentic chuckwagon crews visit for a few days to demonstrate life on the Goodnight Trail, which was more than 100 years ago. Crews cook with standard ingredients; meals are judged and can also be tasted by the public. They are also judged on their wagon, tools, and campsite. The Championship Cookoff takes place on the last demonstration day. However, the champions do not get their buckles until the rodeo finals day.

=== Old Frontier Town ===
The Old Frontier Town (previously Wild Horse Gulch) is open every day of Frontier Days. It is free and is located between the Old West Museum and the Indian Village. There are merchants, guest characters, and/or craftspeople and artisans in some buildings.

=== Carnival Midway ===
On the Frontier Park itself, not far from the stadium, there is the carnival midway, a fair with games, rides, and food vendors. The carnival runs the entire length of Frontier Days. There are a number of different options for daily and season passes.

=== Buckin' A Saloon ===
This saloon is located on Frontier Park, open from 11 a.m. until Midnight. In the evening, there are nightly concert ticket giveaways, beer specials, and bands. It runs most nights of Frontier Days.

=== Fiesta Day ===
One day per year Frontier Days celebrates Fiesta Day. This is a day of Latino entertainment featuring folk dancers and other family events. Also included are concerts by Regional Mexican music artists.

=== United States Air Force Thunderbirds ===
Another annual event is an air show featuring the United States Air Force Thunderbirds Air Demonstration Squadron, which takes place on Wednesday. The Thunderbirds made their public debut at Cheyenne Frontier Days in 1953 and have continued to perform regularly since then. The ground portion of this show along with static displays and flying of other aircraft takes place on the Wyoming Air National Guard side of the Cheyenne Regional Airport. The Thunderbirds' main aerobatic display is performed over Francis E. Warren Air Force Base.

== Affiliated events ==
=== Old West Museum and Store ===
Cheyenne Frontier Days Old West Museum is open all year round. There is a modest admission fee. It is located on Frontier Park. A statue of bull rider rodeo icon Lane Frost riding a bull stands near the entrance. There is an extensive exhibit of western carriages. There is also a permanent exhibit on the history of Cheyenne Frontier Days. During Frontier Days, there is also a Western Art Show and Sale in the museum. The museum also hosts the Cheyenne Frontier Days Hall of Fame for its rodeo. Inductees include legends such as Lane Frost, Chris LeDoux, Johnny Cash, Charlie Daniels, Reba McEntire, George Strait, and Garth Brooks.

=== Art Show and Sale ===
Circa 1980, the annual Western Art Show has been taking place in the Cheyenne Frontier Days Old West Museum. To kick off the art show, a reception is held on the first day, which is usually also the opening day of Frontier Days. Top western and wildlife artists are featured using many different mediums. Those who register for the reception get many special benefits. First there is a buy-it-now option, which enables ticket holders to instantly purchase art at a premium. Then there is a live auction. Both of these enable ticket holders a chance to purchase art before it is made available to the general public. Tickets include art show admission, the Governor's Mansion reception, the official Western Art Show poster, the official show catalogue and a western dinner. After the special events are concluded, the general public is free to view and purchase art at the museum by paying the museum admission fee.

=== Fort D.A. Russell Days ===
F.E. Warren Air Force Base and Cheyenne have a long history together. The U.S. Cavalry founded Fort D.A. Russell, the precursor to the base, in 1867, the same year Cheyenne was founded. For a few days during Frontier Days, the base conducts tours and specials. There are historic home tours, military reenactments, and tours of missile systems. There are also other specials, demonstrations, and transportation. The base is located on the outskirts of Western Cheyenne off Interstate 25.

=== Cowboy Church ===
Cowboy Church is held the first and last Sunday of Frontier Days. Services are held in the B Stand. Location is subject to change. Some services are held non-denominational and everyone is welcome to attend. Some services are held for the cowboys, such as Fellowship of Christian Cowboys.

=== Wyoming National Guard Open House ===
One day during Frontier Days, the Wyoming National Guard may open its doors to the public. This event does not occur every year. The open house features equipment displays of the National Guard and of the F.E. Warren Air Force Base. Sometimes the U.S. Navy Parachute Team, "The Leap Frogs," performs at the event. There are shuttle buses from Frontier Mall to the event. Valid IDs are required. Security enforcement is in place at the base.

== History ==
- Cheyenne held its first Frontier Days celebration in 1897. It started as a cowboy roundup that took place for one day.
- Clayton Danks, the winner of three Cheyenne Frontier Days competitions prior to 1910, is the model cowboy on the horse Steamboat on the Wyoming trademark, the Bucking Horse and Rider.
- From 1908 to 1970, an almost-annual train (skipped 1924, 1942–45) carried travelers between Denver Union Station in Denver, Colorado and the Cheyenne Depot Museum. The final train in 1970 had 27 cars with 1,127 guests.
- Revived in 1992 for the Denver Post's 100th anniversary, the "Centennial Special" used Amtrak locomotives with Ski Train coaches and carried almost 800 passengers, including Colorado Governor Roy Romer and Denver Mayor Wellington Webb.
- In 1994, the excursion train returned as an annual event. It typically consists of Union Pacific 3985, a Union Pacific water car, a helper diesel engine, a tool car, and as many as 22 passenger coaches. After the renovation of the Denver Union Station resulted in a greatly shortened passenger platform, the train's been based at a site near the Denver Coliseum, where it is on display the day before. Tickets for the popular trip are available by lottery and proceeds benefit the Denver Post Community Foundation.
- In 1996, Shirley E. Flynn of Cheyenne wrote a history of Cheyenne Frontier Days called Let's Go! Let's Show! Let's Rodeo! The History of Cheyenne Frontier Days. The book declares that the celebration was a full success from the first year.
- On December 4, 2014, Cheyenne Frontier Days won the 2014 PRCA Large Outdoor Rodeo of the Year for the 15th time and the 10th consecutive time at an award banquet last night in Las Vegas. Cheyenne Frontier Days has previously received the PRCA Large Outdoor Rodeo of the Year award in 1993, 1994, 1995, 1996, 2000, 2004, 2005, 2006, 2007, 2008, 2009, 2010, 2011, 2012, and 2013. PRCA rodeo personnel vote on the finalists for this award. An award banquet is held during the National Finals Rodeo where the winner is announced.
- In 2015, the concert lineup was considered to be their best ever, with the opening weekend featuring Miranda Lambert and Big & Rich.
- In 2019, the Denver Post announced the end of the excursion, with the Union Pacific Railroad's vintage fleet being a contributing factor.
- The next year saw the COVID-19 pandemic forcing officials to scrap the festival & rodeo, and defer to 2021.

== See also ==
- Union Pacific 844
- Professional Rodeo Cowboys Association
- National Finals Rodeo
- Rodeo bareback rigging
- Wyoming Transportation Museum
- Cheyenne Frontier Days Old West Museum
- Cheyenne Frontier Days Arena
- Livestock
- Dan Collins Taylor
- Death of Lane Frost

== Bibliography ==
- Cheyenne Frontier Days 2018 Media Guide (PDF). Cheyenne Frontier Days.
