= List of Professional Bull Riders Champions =

- Sport: Bull riding
- Founded: 1992
- Owner: TKO Group Holdings
- Competitors: Over 800 total; 40 in highest ranked tour
- Countries: United States; Canada; Brazil; Australia
- Most recent champion: (United States) John Crimber
- Website: PBR.com

This List of Professional Bull Riders Champions provides lists of all the year-end champions of the Professional Bull Riders, Inc. (PBR). There are the World Champion bull riders, World Finals event champions, World Champion bulls, and Rookie of the Year, for example. Also listed are the winners of various awards that are given out at the end of each season. The Professional Bull Riders, Inc. (PBR) is an international professional bull riding organization based in Fort Worth, Texas, United States. PBR events are televised on CBS and The CW and streamed live on the paywall-based Paramount+ and for free on RidePass on Pluto TV. More than 800 bull riders from the United States, Canada, Brazil, Australia and other countries hold PBR memberships. This article lists all the various champions and awards that have been bestowed since the founding of the PBR in 1992.

== World Champion Bull Riders ==
- 1994 (Brazil) Adriano Morães
- 1995 (United States) Tuff Hedeman
- 1996 (United States) Owen Washburn
- 1997 (United States) Michael Gaffney
- 1998 (Australia) Troy Dunn
- 1999 (United States) Cody Hart
- 2000 (United States) Chris Shivers
- 2001 (Brazil) Adriano Morães
- 2002 (Brazil) Ednei Caminhas
- 2003 (United States) Chris Shivers
- 2004 (United States) Mike Lee
- 2005 (United States) Justin McBride
- 2006 (Brazil) Adriano Morães
- 2007 (United States) Justin McBride
- 2008 (Brazil) Guilherme Marchi
- 2009 (United States) Kody Lostroh
- 2010 (Brazil) Renato Nunes
- 2011 (Brazil) Silvano Alves
- 2012 (Brazil) Silvano Alves
- 2013 (United States) J.B. Mauney
- 2014 (Brazil) Silvano Alves
- 2015 (United States) J.B. Mauney
- 2016 (United States) Cooper Davis
- 2017 (United States) Jess Lockwood
- 2018 (Brazil) Kaique Pacheco
- 2019 (United States) Jess Lockwood
- 2020 (Brazil) José Vitor Leme
- 2021 (Brazil) José Vitor Leme
- 2022 (United States) Daylon Swearingen
- 2023 (Brazil) Rafael José de Brito
- 2024 (Brazil) Cássio Dias
- 2025 (Brazil) José Vitor Leme
- 2026 (United States) John Crimber

== World Finals Event Champions ==
- 1994 (United States) Ted Nuce
- 1995 (Australia) Troy Dunn
- 1996 (United States) Ronnie Kitchens
- 1997 (Australia) Troy Dunn
- 1998 (United States) Reed Corder
- 1999 (United States) Ty Murray
- 2000 (United States) Tater Porter
- 2001 (United States) Luke Snyder
- 2002 (United States) J.W. Hart
- 2003 (United States) Jody Newberry
- 2004 (United States) Mike Lee
- 2005 (Brazil) Guilherme Marchi
- 2006 (United States) L.J. Jenkins
- 2007 (United States) Wiley Petersen
- 2008 (Brazil) Robson Palermo
- 2009 (United States) J.B. Mauney
- 2010 (Brazil) Renato Nunes
- 2011 (Brazil) Robson Palermo
- 2012 (Brazil) Robson Palermo
- 2013 (United States) J.B. Mauney
- 2014 (Brazil) Silvano Alves
- 2015 (United States) Cooper Davis
- 2016 (United States) Ryan Dirteater
- 2017 (Brazil) José Vitor Leme
- 2018 (Brazil) Marco Eguchi
- 2019 (United States) Jess Lockwood
- 2020 (United States) Boudreaux Campbell
- 2021 (Brazil) José Vitor Leme
- 2022 (United States) Daylon Swearingen
- 2023 (Brazil) Rafael José de Brito
- 2024 (United States) Sage Kimzey
- 2025 (Brazil) José Vitor Leme
- 2026 (United States) Hudson Bolton

== Rookie of the Year ==
- 1995 (United States) J.W. Hart
- 1996 (United States) Ronnie Kitchens
- 1997 (United States) Keith Adams
- 1998 (United States) Pete Hessman
- 1999 (United States) Mike White
- 2000 (United States) Jason Bennett
- 2001 (United States) Luke Snyder
- 2002 (United States) Dan Henricks
- 2003 (United States) Jody Newberry
- 2004 (United States) Zack Brown
- 2005 (United States) Kody Lostroh
- 2006 (United States) J.B. Mauney
- 2007 (United States) Clayton Williams
- 2008 (United States) Reese Cates
- 2009 (United States) Cody Nance
- 2010 (Brazil) Silvano Alves
- 2011 (Brazil) Rubens Barbosa
- 2012 (Brazil) Emilio Resende
- 2013 (Brazil) João Ricardo Vieira
- 2014 (United States) J. W. Harris
- 2015 (Brazil) Kaique Pacheco
- 2016 (United States) Jess Lockwood
- 2017 (Brazil) José Vitor Leme
- 2018 (United States) Keyshawn Whitehorse
- 2019 (United States) Dalton Kasel
- 2020 (United States) Boudreaux Campbell
- 2021 (United States) Eli Vastbinder
- 2022 (United States) Bob Mitchell
- 2023 (Brazil) Rafael José de Brito
- 2024 (Brazil) Cássio Dias
- 2025 (United States) Hudson Bolton
- 2026 (United States) Marco Rizzo

== World Champion Bull ==
- 1995 – Bodacious
- 1996 – Babyface
- 1997 – Panhandle Slim
- 1998 – Moody Blues
- 1999 – Promiseland
- 2000 – Dillinger
- 2001 – Dillinger
- 2002 – Little Yellow Jacket
- 2003 – Little Yellow Jacket
- 2004 – Little Yellow Jacket
- 2005 – Big Bucks
- 2006 – Mossy Oak Mudslinger
- 2007 – Chicken on a Chain
- 2008 – Bones
- 2009 – Code Blue
- 2010 – Bones
- 2011 – Bushwacker
- 2012 – Asteroid
- 2013 – Bushwacker
- 2014 – Bushwacker
- 2015 – Sweet Pro's Long John
- 2016 – SweetPro's Bruiser • and ••
- 2017 – SweetPro's Bruiser
- 2018 – SweetPro's Bruiser
- 2019 – Smooth Operator
- 2020 – Smooth Operator
- 2021 – Woopaa
- 2022 – Ridin' Solo
- 2023 – Ridin' Solo
- 2024 – Man Hater
- 2025 – Man Hater
- 2026 – Ransom

• Bodacious was also the 1994–1995 PRCA Bucking Bull of the Year. When Sweet Pro's Bruiser won the PRCA Bucking Bull of the Year award for 2017, he and Bodacious became the only bulls to win both the PRCA and PBR titles. Each bull won their two titles in the same year. Bodacious won both of his titles in 1995, while Sweet Pro's Bruiser won both of his titles in 2017.

•• There was actually a tie between Sweet Pro's Bruiser, Sweet Pro's Long John and Pearl Harbor, which was resolved by taking the sum of the bull's best eight outs for the season. That is done according to the PBR rules as the first way to resolve a tiebreaker.

== Bull of the World Finals ==
- 1996 – Strawberry Wine
- 1997 – Nitro
- 1998 – Cash
- 1999 – Dillinger (tie)
- 1999 – Promiseland (tie)
- 2000 – Promiseland
- 2001 – Little Yellow Jacket
- 2002 – Ugly
- 2003 – Neon Nights
- 2004 – Crossfire Hurricane
- 2005 – Pandora's Box
- 2006 – Lucky Strike (tie)
- 2006 – Scene of the Crash (tie)
- 2007 – Chicken on a Chain (tie)
- 2007 – Troubadour (tie)
- 2008 – Bones
- 2009 – Code Blue
- 2010 – Bones
- 2011 – Bushwacker
- 2012 – Asteroid
- 2013 – Bushwacker
- 2014 – No bull awarded
- 2015 – No bull awarded
- 2016 – No bull awarded
- 2017 – Sweet Pro's Bruiser
- 2018 – Hocus Pocus (tie)
- 2018 – Legit (tie)
- 2019 – Smooth Operator
- 2020 – I'm Busted (tie)
- 2020 – Smooth Operator (tie)
- 2021 – Woopaa
- 2022 – Night Hawk
- 2023 – Ridin' Solo
- 2024 – Red Demon
- 2025 – Man Hater
- 2026 – Ransom

== U.S. Touring Pro Division Champions ==
- 1995 (United States) Tuff Hedeman
- 1996 (United States) Tuff Hedeman
- 1997 (Australia) Troy Dunn
- 1998 (United States) Brian Herman
- 1999 (United States) Jason Bennett
- 2000 (United States) Chris Shivers
- 2001 (Brazil) Paulo Crimber
- 2002 (Brazil) Adriano Morães
- 2003 (Brazil) Adriano Morães
- 2004 (United States) Ross Johnson
- 2005 (Brazil) Edgard Oliveira
- 2006 (United States) J.B. Mauney
- 2007 (United States) Clayton Williams
- 2008 (United States) Clayton Williams
- 2009 (United States) J.B. Mauney
- 2010 (United States) Douglas Duncan
- 2011 (United States) Shane Proctor
- 2012 (Brazil) Edevaldo Ferreira
- 2013 (United States) Chase Outlaw
- 2014 (United States) Jason Malone
- 2015 (Brazil) Luis Blanco
- 2016 (United States) Cody Nance
- 2017 (United States) Ezekiel Mitchell
- 2018 (United States) Andrew Alvidrez
- 2019 (United States) Jess Lockwood
- 2020 (Brazil) José Vitor Leme
- 2021 (United States) Daylon Swearingen
- 2022 (United States) Daylon Swearingen
- 2023 (United States) Josh Frost
- 2024 (Brazil) Jean Fernandes Pereira
- 2025 (Brazil) Lucas Martins Costa
- 2026 (United States) Wyatt Rogers

Note: This tour debuted in 1995 as the Touring Pro Division. In 2001, it was renamed the Challenger Tour. 2009 was the last year in which this tour had a year-end finals event, and in 2010, it was changed back to its original title of the Touring Pro Division.

== Velocity Tour Champions ==
- 2014 (United States) Jason Malone
- 2015 (United States) Gage Gay
- 2016 (United States) Chase Outlaw
- 2017 (Brazil) Alex Marcilio
- 2018 (Brazil) Alisson de Souza
- 2019 (Brazil) José Vitor Leme
- 2020 (United States) Mason Taylor
- 2021 (Brazil) Adriano Salgado
- 2022 (United States) Clayton Sellars
- 2023 (United States) Josh Frost
- 2024 (United States) Grayson Cole
- 2025 (United States) Marcus Mast
- 2026 (United States) Grayson Cole

== Velocity Tour Finals Champions ==
- 2015 (United States) Gage Gay
- 2016 (United States) Chase Outlaw
- 2017 (United States) Sage Kimzey
- 2018 (United States) Chase Outlaw
- 2019 (Brazil) José Vitor Leme
- 2020 (United States) Mason Taylor
- 2021 (United States) Boudreaux Campbell
- 2022 (United States) Cody Jesus
- 2023 (Brazil) João Lucas Campos
- 2024 (United States) John Crimber
- 2025 (Brazil) Paulo Eduardo Rossetto
- 2026 (United States) Daniel Keeping

== Million Dollar Bull Team Challenge Champions ==
- 2019 – Harrison / Swearingin / Berger & Barrett Bucking Stock
- 2020 – Melton Bull Co.
- 2021 – Sho-Me Rodeo / Rafter J
- 2022 – Halpain Bucking Bulls
- 2023 – Nothin' But Try Ranch / Diggers Bucking Bulls
- 2024 – G&H Cattle
- 2025 – Silent 7 / Hilton Bull Co.
- 2026 – Twisted Horns Cattle Co.

== Challenger Series Champions ==
- 2022 (United States) Keyshawn Whitehorse
- 2023 (Brazil) Alan de Souza
- 2024 (Canada) Cody Coverchuk
- 2025 (Brazil) Gustavo Luíz da Silva
- 2026 (Brazil) João Paulo Velasco

== Challenger Series Finals Champions ==
- 2022 (Brazil) Sandro Batista
- 2023 (United States) Eli Vastbinder
- 2024 (Brazil) Claudio Montanha, Jr.
- 2025 (Brazil) Lauro Nunes Vieira
- 2026 (Brazil) Gabriel Henrique da Silva

== International Champions ==
=== PBR Canada ===
- 2006 (Canada) Scott Schiffner
- 2007 (Canada) Tyler Pankewicz
- 2008 (Canada) Aaron Roy
- 2009 (United States) Beau Hill
- 2010 (Canada) Aaron Roy
- 2011 (Canada) Tyler Thomson
- 2012 (Canada) Aaron Roy
- 2013 (Canada) Zane Lambert
- 2014 (United States) Stetson Lawrence
- 2015 (Canada) Tanner Byrne
- 2016 (Canada) Ty Pozzobon
- 2017 (Canada) Zane Lambert
- 2018 (Canada) Cody Coverchuk
- 2019 (United States) Daylon Swearingen
- 2020 (Canada) Dakota Buttar
- 2021 (Canada) Cody Coverchuk
- 2022 (Canada) Nick Tetz
- 2023 (Canada) Dakota Buttar
- 2024 (Canada) Nick Tetz
- 2025 (Canada) Jared Parsonage
- 2026 (Canada) Nick Tetz

=== PBR Brazil ===
- 2006 (Brazil) Elton José de Souza
- 2007 (Brazil) João Mauro Kugel
- 2008 (Brazil) Edmundo Gomes
- 2009 (Brazil) Thiago Paguioto
- 2010 (Brazil) Elton Cide
- 2011 (Brazil) Edevaldo Ferreira
- 2012 (Brazil) Edevaldo Ferreira
- 2013 (Brazil) Claudio Crisostomo
- 2014 (Brazil) Tiago Vitor
- 2015 (Brazil) Luciano Henrique de Castro
- 2016 (Brazil) Dener Barbosa
- 2017 (Brazil) José Vitor Leme
- 2018 (Brazil) Fernando Henrique Novais
- 2019 (Brazil) Alan de Souza
- 2020 – No PBR Brazil events this year due to COVID-19 restrictions.
- 2021 – Only one PBR Brazil event this year. It was closed to the public due to the continuity of COVID-19 restrictions.
- 2022 (Brazil) Cássio Dias
- 2023 (Brazil) Jean Fernandes Pereira
- 2024 (Brazil) Rogério Venâncio
- 2025 (Brazil) Gustavo Luiz da Silva
- 2026 (Brazil) João Paulo Velasco

=== PBR Australia ===
- 2006 (Australia) Tim Wilson
- 2007 (Australia) Ben Jones
- 2008 (Australia) Pete Farley
- 2009 (Australia) David Kennedy
- 2010 (Australia) David Kennedy
- 2011 (Australia) Kevin "Jock" Connolly
- 2012 (Australia) David Kennedy
- 2013 (Australia) Chris Lowe
- 2014 (Australia) David Kennedy
- 2015 (New Zealand) Fraser Babbington
- 2016 (Australia) Cody Heffernan
- 2017 (Australia) Troy Wilkinson
- 2018 (Australia) Aaron Kleier
- 2019 (Australia) Aaron Kleier
- 2020 (Australia) Aaron Kleier
- 2021 (Australia) Aaron Kleier
- 2022 (Australia) Cody Heffernan
- 2023 (Australia) Macaulie Leather
- 2024 (Australia) Boston Leather
- 2025 (Australia) Kurt Shephard
- 2026 (Australia) Kurt Shephard

=== PBR Mexico (Defunct) ===
- 2006 (Mexico) Mario Galindo
- 2007 (Mexico) Hugo Pedrero
- 2008 – No PBR Mexico events this year.
- 2009 (Australia) Jason O'Hearn
- 2010 (Mexico) Adrian Ferreiro
- 2011 (Brazil) Simao da Silva
- 2012 (Mexico) Juan Carlos Contreras
- 2013 (Mexico) Gustavo Pedrero
- 2014 (Mexico) Gustavo Pedrero
- 2015 (Costa Rica) Alejandro Gamboa
- 2016 (Mexico) Juan Carlos Contreras
- 2017 (Mexico) Francisco Morales
- 2018 (Mexico) Francisco García Torres
- 2019 (Mexico) Francisco García Torres
- 2020 – No PBR Mexico events this year due to COVID-19 restrictions.
- 2021 – No PBR Mexico events this year due to continued COVID-19 restrictions.
- 2022 – No PBR Mexico events for a third year in a row.
- 2023 – After only one event this year, PBR Mexico officially went out of business.

Note: All PBR Mexico events in the 2009 season were held in San Antonio, Texas, United States.

== World Cup Champions ==
- 2007 Team Brazil
- 2008 (United States) Team USA
- 2009 (United States) Team USA
- 2010 Team Brazil

Event discontinued after 2010.

== Global Cup Champions ==
- 2017 (United States) Team USA
- 2018 Team Brazil
- 2019 Team Brazil
- 2020 (United States) Team USA Eagles
- 2021 – No Global Cup event this year due to different COVID-19 protocols between the five PBR countries.
- 2022 (United States) Team USA Eagles

Event discontinued after 2022.

== Australia Origin Series Champions ==
- 2019 Team Queensland
- 2020 – No Origin Series events this year due to COVID-19 restrictions.
- 2021 Team Queensland
- 2022 Team Queensland
- 2023 Team Queensland
- 2024 Team Queensland
- 2025 Team New South Wales
- 2026 Team Queensland

== U.S. Team Series Champions ==
=== Regular-Season Champions ===
- 2022 (Texas) Austin Gamblers
- 2023 (Texas) Austin Gamblers
- 2024 (Missouri) Kansas City Outlaws
- 2025 Florida Freedom
- 2026 Missouri Thunder

=== Regular-Season MVP ===
- 2022 (Brazil) José Vitor Leme (Team: (Texas) Austin Gamblers)
- 2023 (Brazil) José Vitor Leme (Team: (Texas) Austin Gamblers)
- 2024 (United States) John Crimber (Team: Florida Freedom)
- 2025 (United States) John Crimber (Team: Florida Freedom)
- 2026 (Brazil) José Vitor Leme (Team: (Texas) Austin Gamblers)

=== Team Series Championship Winners ===
- 2022 (Tennessee) Nashville Stampede
- 2023 Texas Rattlers
- 2024 (Texas) Austin Gamblers
- 2025 (North Carolina) Carolina Cowboys
- 2026 (Tennessee) Nashville Stampede

=== Team Series Championship MVP ===
- 2023 (Brazil) João Ricardo Vieira (Team: Texas Rattlers)
- 2024 (United States) John Crimber (Team: Florida Freedom)
- 2025 (United States) Clay Guiton (Team: (North Carolina) Carolina Cowboys)
- 2026 (Brazil) Eduardo Aparecido (Team: Arizona Ridge Riders)

=== Team Series Rookie of the Year ===
- 2025 (Brazil) Everton Natan da Silva (Team: Arizona Ridge Riders)
- 2026 (Brazil) Jean Carlos Teodoro (Team: Texas Rattlers)

== Monster Energy Team Challenge Champions ==
- 2026 Missouri Thunder

== Other awards ==
The PBR has some secondary awards, in addition to the World Championship, given out annually, some named after bull riders fatally injured during competition.

The Rookie of the Year award goes to the rookie (first full year of Premier Series competition) bull rider who wins the most points of all first-year competitors.

The Stock Contractor of the Year award goes to the stock contractor who has supplied the best bulls to Premier Series events. This award is given based on a vote among the top PBR bull riders.

The Bull of the World Finals award goes to the bull who scores the highest points combining all his outs during the PBR World Finals.

The Lane Frost/Brent Thurman Award is for the highest-scoring single ride at the World Finals. It is named for Lane Frost, the 1987 Professional Rodeo Cowboys Association (PRCA) World Champion bull rider who was fatally injured at the Cheyenne Frontier Days rodeo on July 30, 1989; and Brent Thurman, a rising star in pro bull riding and co-founder of the PBR who was seriously injured at the National Finals Rodeo in Las Vegas on December 11, 1994, and died six days later.

The Glen Keeley Award is for the Canadian bull rider who earns the most points throughout the entire Premier Series season. It is named for Glen Keeley, the 1989 Canadian Professional Rodeo Association (CPRA) champion bull rider who died of injuries sustained at the PBR Bud Light Cup Series' Ty Murray Invitational on March 24, 2000, in Albuquerque, New Mexico.

The Mason Lowe Award is for the highest-scoring single ride during the regular season of the Premier Series. Mason Lowe was an American bull rider who died of his injuries after being stepped on by a bull on January 15, 2019, during a PBR Velocity Tour event held in conjunction with the National Western Stock Show in Denver, Colorado.

The Team Series Regular-Season MVP is awarded to the individual rider who earned the most points during the regular season of the PBR's U.S. Team Series.

The Team Series Championship MVP is awarded to the individual rider who earned the most points at the Championship event of the Team Series.

The Golden Clipboard Award is given to a Team Series front-office executive or coach who excels at managing league rules, meeting operational deadlines, communicating with the league office, and keeping behind-the-scenes team logistics running smoothly.

The PBR also has recognition awards in the Heroes and Legends Celebration. Some of these like the Ring of Honor and the Brand of Honor are the equivalent of a Hall of Fame recognition. In 2019 and 2020, the Mason Lowe Award was presented in the arena during the PBR World Finals, but it became a part of the Heroes and Legends Celebration in 2021. However, by 2022, it was now awarded during the opening gala the day before the beginning of the PBR World Finals. From 2011 through 2019, and again in 2021, the Heroes and Legends Celebration took place just before the start of the PBR World Finals. However, as of 2022, said ceremony is no longer a part of the PBR World Finals. Beginning in 2023, it will be held at the National Cowboy & Western Heritage Museum in September during the week of Freedom Fest, the annual PBR Team Series event in Oklahoma City, Oklahoma.

=== Stock Contractor of the Year ===
- 1995 – Terry Williams
- 1996 – Terry Williams
- 1997 – Terry Williams
- 1998 – Terry Williams
- 1999 – Terry Williams
- 2000 – Herrington Cattle Company
- 2001 – D&H Cattle Company
- 2002 – D&H Cattle Company
- 2003 – D&H Cattle Company
- 2004 – D&H Cattle Company
- 2005 – D&H Cattle Company
- 2006 – Page & Teague Bucking Bulls
- 2007 – Chad Berger and Larry Ryken
- 2008 – Chad Berger and Clay Struve
- 2009 – Chad Berger and Clay Struve
- 2010 – Jeff Robinson
- 2011 – Jeff Robinson
- 2012 – Jeff Robinson
- 2013 – Jeff Robinson
- 2014 – Chad Berger and Clay Struve
- 2015 – Chad Berger and Clay Struve
- 2016 – Chad Berger and Clay Struve
- 2017 – Chad Berger and Clay Struve
- 2018 – Chad Berger and Clay Struve
- 2019 – Chad Berger and Clay Struve
- 2020 – Chad Berger and Clay Struve
- 2021 – Chad Berger and Clay Struve
- 2022 – Chad Berger, Clay Struve and D&H Cattle Company
- 2023 – Blake Sharp
- 2024 – Blake Sharp
- 2025 – Blake Sharp
- 2026 – Blake Sharp

=== Lane Frost/Brent Thurman Award recipients ===
- 1996 (Brazil) Adriano Morães (93.5 points on Shotgun Red)
- 1997 (Australia) Troy Dunn (95 points on Red Wolf)
- 1998 (United States) Cody Custer (95.5 points on Red Wolf)
- 1999 (United States) Chris Shivers (96 points on Trick or Treat) (tie)
- 1999 (United States) Terry Don West (96 points on Promiseland) (tie)
- 2000 (Brazil) Ednei Caminhas (94.5 points on Dillinger)
- 2001 (United States) Chris Shivers (96.5 points on Dillinger)
- 2002 (United States) Cory McFadden (95 points on Little Yellow Jacket)
- 2003 (United States) Jody Newberry (94.5 points on Little Yellow Jacket)
- 2004 (United States) Michael Gaffney (93.75 points on Little Yellow Jacket) (tie)
- 2004 (United States) Mike Lee (93.75 points on Mossy Oak Mudslinger) (tie)
- 2005 (United States) Cody Whitney (94.75 points on Little Yellow Jacket)
- 2006 (United States) Dustin Hall (93 points on Here's Your Sign) (tie)
- 2006 (Brazil) Adriano Morães (93 points on Here's Your Sign) (tie)
- 2007 (United States) J.B. Mauney (92.75 points on Copperhead Slinger)
- 2008 (United States) J.B. Mauney (93.75 points on Crosswired)
- 2009 (United States) J.B. Mauney (93.75 points on Black Pearl)
- 2010 (Brazil) Valdiron de Oliveira (91.5 points on Spit Fire)
- 2011 (Brazil) Robson Palermo (93.25 points on King of Hearts)
- 2012 (United States) Austin Meier (90.75 points on Shepherd Hills Trapper) (tie)
- 2012 (United States) Chris Shivers (90.75 on Shepherd Hills Sod Buster) (tie)
- 2013 (United States) J.B. Mauney (93.75 points on Smackdown)
- 2014 (United States) J.B. Mauney (94 points on Percolator)
- 2015 (United States) J.B. Mauney (92.75 points on Bruiser)
- 2016 (United States) Cooper Davis (91 points on Catfish John)
- 2017 (Brazil) José Vitor Leme (94.5 points on Magic Train)
- 2018 (Brazil) Marco Eguchi (94 points on Spotted Demon)
- 2019 (Brazil) Rubens Barbosa (95.75 points on Chiseled)
- 2020 (Brazil) José Vitor Leme (95.75 points on Woopaa)
- 2021 (Brazil) José Vitor Leme (98.75 points on Woopaa)
- 2022 (Brazil) Mauricio Moreira (94.25 points on Jive Turkey)
- 2023 (United States) Andrew Alvidrez (91.5 points on Red Mosquito)
- 2024 (United States) John Crimber (95 points on Big Bank)
- 2025 (Australia) Brady Fielder (91 points on Magic Hunter) (tie)
- 2025 (Brazil) José Vitor Leme (91 points on Walk Hard) (tie)
- 2026 (Brazil) Eduardo Aparecido (96.1 points on Ransom)

=== Glen Keeley Award recipients ===
- 2000 – B.J. Kramps
- 2001 – B.J. Kramps
- 2002 – Reuben Geleynse
- 2003 – Rob Bell
- 2004 – Rob Bell
- 2005 – Matt Roy
- 2006 – Jesse Torkelson
- 2007 – Scott Schiffner
- 2008 – Aaron Roy
- 2009 – Aaron Roy
- 2010 – Aaron Roy
- 2011 – Aaron Roy
- 2012 – Chad Besplug
- 2013 – Aaron Roy
- 2014 – Tanner Byrne
- 2015 – Tanner Byrne
- 2016 – Tanner Byrne
- 2017 – Dakota Buttar
- 2018 – Dakota Buttar
- 2019 – Dakota Buttar
- 2020 – Dakota Buttar
- 2021 – Dakota Buttar
- 2022 – Griffin Smeltzer
- 2023 – Nick Tetz
- 2024 – Jake Gardner
- 2025 – Nick Tetz
- 2026 – No rider awarded, as no Canadian scored any points on the Premier Series this season.

=== Mason Lowe Award recipients ===
- 2019 (United States) Jess Lockwood (94 points on Heartbreak Kid in Nampa, Idaho)
- 2020 (Brazil) José Vitor Leme (94.25 points on Smooth Operator in Billings, Montana)
- 2021 (Brazil) José Vitor Leme (97.75 points on Woopaa in Tulsa, Oklahoma)
- 2022 (Brazil) José Vitor Leme (94.75 points on Ridin' Solo in Oklahoma City, Oklahoma)
- 2023 (Brazil) Kaique Pacheco (93 points on Ricky Vaughn in Indianapolis, Indiana)
- 2024 (Brazil) Cássio Dias (94.75 points on Man Hater in Los Angeles, California)
- 2025 (United States) Andrew Alvidrez (94 points on Man Hater in Milwaukee, Wisconsin)
- 2026 (United States) Daylon Swearingen (94.9 points on Pegasus in Tacoma, Washington)

=== U.S. Team Series General Manager of the Year ===
- 2022 (United States) Tina Battock (Team: (Tennessee) Nashville Stampede)
- 2023 (United States) Chad Blankenship (Team: Texas Rattlers)
- 2024 (United States) Jim Smith (Team: (Missouri) Kansas City Outlaws)
- 2025 (United States) Casey Lane (Team: Arizona Ridge Riders)
- 2026 TBD

=== U.S. Team Series Coach of the Year ===
- 2022 (United States) Justin McBride (Team: (Tennessee) Nashville Stampede)
- 2023 (United States) Cody Lambert (Team: Texas Rattlers)
- 2024 (United States) J.W. Hart (Team: (Missouri) Kansas City Outlaws)
- 2025 (United States) Jerome Davis (Team: (North Carolina) Carolina Cowboys)
- 2026 TBD

=== Golden Clipboard Award ===
- 2024 (Canada) Chris Dashney (Team: Oklahoma Wildcatters)
- 2025 (United States) Chris Pantani (Team: (New York (state)) New York Mavericks)
- 2026 (United States) Chad Blankenship (Team: Texas Rattlers)

=== High Money Bull of the Regular Season ===
Awarded to the bull who earned the most money for the bull riders in the regular season. Discontinued after 2013.

- 1995 – Babyface
- 1996 – High Voltage
- 1997 – Shotgun Red
- 1998 – Promiseland
- 1999 – Gusto
- 2000 – Moody Blues
- 2001 – Promiseland
- 2002 – Promiseland
- 2003 – Maximus
- 2004 – Bo Howdy
- 2005 – Mossy Oak Mudslinger
- 2006 – Chief
- 2007 – Evil Forces
- 2008 – Cat Man Do
- 2009 – Fully Loaded
- 2010 – Segs The Juice
- 2011 – Gunpowder & Lead
- 2012 – Bad Moon
- 2013 – Prince Albert

=== Golden Barrel Awards ===
The Golden Barrel Award recipients were decided by fans who voted online. The categories were based on moments that occurred during the Premier Series regular season. The Best Celebration award was for the rider who gave the best celebration after completing a successful qualified ride; the Best Winning Ride award was for the rider who gave the best ride of the regular season; the Best Save award was for the bullfighter who put out the best save of a rider from a bull; the 7 Seconds of Agony award was for the rider who gave the best seven-second ride; and the Best Breakthrough Performance award was for the rider who gave the best comeback performance after recently going through some professional setbacks. The final category was added in 2022. 2021 and 2022 were the only years in which these awards were given out.

2021

- Best Celebration: (United States) Ezekiel Mitchell
- Best Winning Ride: (Brazil) José Vitor Leme
- Best Save: (United States) Cody Webster
- 7 Seconds of Agony: (United States) Keyshawn Whitehorse

2022

- Best Celebration: (United States) Stetson Lawrence
- Best Winning Ride: (Brazil) João Ricardo Vieira
- Best Save: (United States) Frank Newsom
- 7 Seconds of Agony: (United States) Daylon Swearingen
- Best Breakthrough Performance: (United States) Daylon Swearingen

=== Team Series Fan Favorite Bull ===
Awarded to the best performing bull during the regular season of the U.S. Team Series and was decided by fans who voted online. It was only awarded during the first three seasons of the Team Series.

- 2022 – Moonlight Party
- 2023 – Utz BesTex Legend
- 2024 – Cool Whip

== Heroes and Legends Celebration ==
This article presents a list of major champions and honors won by Professional Bull Riders. The Heroes and Legends Celebrations have their own article which lists the Ring of Honor, Sharon Shoulders Award, Jim Shoulders Lifetime Achievement Award, Brand of Honor, and Ty Murray Top Hand Award.

== See also ==
- American Bucking Bull
- Bull Riders Only
- Bull Riding Hall of Fame
- Championship Bull Riding
- International Professional Rodeo Association
- Lists of rodeo performers
- PBR Global Cup
- PBR World Cup
- Professional Rodeo Cowboys Association
- ProRodeo Hall of Fame
