= The Ride (TV series) =

- Genre: Docuseries
- Starring: Jose Vitor Leme; Ezekiel Mitchell; Dakota Louis; Boudreaux Campbell; Daylon Swearingen; Chase Outlaw; Eli Vastbinder
- Country of origin: United States
- Original language: English
- No. of seasons: 1
- No. of episodes: 8

Production
- Executive producers: Micah Brown; Chris Coelen; Eric Detwiler; Sean Gleason; Lawrence Randall; Karrie Wolfe
- Running time: 33-57 minutes
- Production companies: Prime Video Sports; Kinetic Content; Professional Bull Riders

Original release
- Network: Prime Video
- Release: May 30, 2023

The Ride is an American television documentary series about professional bull riding. It premiered on Prime Video on May 30, 2023.

== Summary ==
The series delves into the world of professional bull riding, offering a behind-the-scenes look into the daily lives of some of the riders and coaches in the Professional Bull Riders (PBR) inaugural 2022 Team Series season.

== Cast ==
=== Bull riders ===
- José Vitor Leme
- Ezekiel Mitchell
- Dakota Louis
- Boudreaux Campbell
- Daylon Swearingen
- Chase Outlaw
- Eli Vastbinder

=== Coaches ===
- Michael Gaffney
- Jerome Davis
- Cord McCoy

== Episodes ==
No.	Title	Directed by	Original release date
1	"Ride or Die"	Unknown	30 May 2023
2	"Comeback Kings"	Unknown	30 May 2023
3	"Austin vs. Everybody"	Unknown	30 May 2023
4	"Sweet Home Carolina"	Unknown	30 May 2023
5	"Bitter Victory"	Unknown	30 May 2023
6	"Lone Stars"	Unknown	30 May 2023
7	"This is War"	Unknown	30 May 2023
8	"Winner Take All"	Unknown	30 May 2023

== Production ==
On January 26, 2023, it was reported that Amazon ordered an 8-episode season of The Ride, to premiere later in 2023. It is executive produced by Chris Coelen, Eric Detwiler, Karrie Wolfe, Micah Brown, Sean Gleason, and Lawrence Randall, and is a co-production from Prime Video Sports, Kinetic Content, and PBR.

== Release ==
The trailer was released on May 11, 2023, and the eight-episode docuseries premiered on Prime Video on May 30, 2023.
