= Fearless (2016 TV series) =

2016 Portuguese-language docu-series on Netflix

- Genre: Documentary
- Created by: Andrew Fried
- Starring: Grant Crookes; Ty Murray
- Country of origin: United States
- Original languages: English; Portuguese
- No. of seasons: 1
- No. of episodes: 6

Production
- Running time: 50-58 min.

Original release
- Network: Netflix
- Release: August 19, 2016

Fearless is a 2016 Netflix original documentary series created by Andrew Fried and starring Grant Crookes and Ty Murray following a group of U.S. and Brazilian bull riders on the Professional Bull Riders (PBR) circuit, including 3-time world champion Silvano Alves.

== Premise ==
Fearless follows a group of U.S. and Brazilian professional bull riders. The series takes a look at the community, the background and the current culture of bull riding, with former bull riding world champion Adriano Moraes adding his thoughts periodically.

== Cast ==
- Grant Crookes
- Ty Murray
- Silvano Alves
- Adriano Morães
- João Ricardo Vieira
- Guilherme Marchi
- Kaique Pacheco
- Cody Nance
- J.B. Mauney
- Renato Nunes
- Robson Palermo
- Valdiron de Oliveira
- Brett Hoffman

== Release ==
It was released on August 19, 2016, on Netflix streaming.
