= Woopaa =

American bucking bull

- Breed: American Bucking Bull
- Sex: Bull
- Born: March 9, 2017 (age 9)
- Nationality: United States
- Years active: 2019 - 2023
- Owners: Larry Barker, Laramie Wilson
- Parents: Dances with Gravy (sire); BB 319 (dam)
- Weight: 1600 lb (730 kg)
- Appearance: Red
- Awards: 2020 ABBI World Champion Classic Bull; 2021 PBR World Champion Bull; 2021 PBR Bull of the World Finals

Woopaa #124 (born March 9, 2017) is an American retired bucking bull. He is the 2021 PBR World Champion Bull.

In 2023, Woopaa was ranked No. 7 on the list of the top 30 bulls in PBR history.

== Background ==
Woopaa was born on March 9, 2017. He was owned by Larry Barker of Barker Bulls in Las Cruces, New Mexico, and stock contractor Laramie Wilson of Hookin' W Ranch in Tupelo, Oklahoma. He is a red-colored bull, whose brand is 124. His sire is Dances with Gravy, and his dam is BB 319. Woopaa is named for his owner Larry Barker's friend, J.P. Lewis, who used to yell "Woopaa!” frequently. Lewis died from cancer in 2017.

== Career ==
Woopaa competed on the PBR circuit from 2020 to 2023. He won the World Champion Bull title in 2021. On April 2, 2022, Woopaa was ranked first in the world standings. His riding streak was -1, and his average bull score was 45.91. He had bucked in 25 events. His buckoff percentage was 58, and his average rider score was 40.40. His average buckoff time was 2.15 seconds. He had 21 45-points or higher rides.

=== Season 2020 ===
These are Woopaa's outs in the PBR in the 2020 season:

Woopaa bucked off Ty Wainwright for a score of 44 in 2.28 seconds at a PBR Touring Pro Division event in San Antonio, Texas. He then bucked off Joao Henrique Lucas in 3.2 seconds for a score of 43 points at a PBR Velocity Tour event in Memphis, Tennessee. He then bucked off Taylor Toves in 5.02 seconds for a score of 42.75 points at a PBR Unleash the Beast Series event in Little Rock, Arkansas. Woopaa next bucked off Rafael Henrique Dos Santos in 0 seconds for a score of 44.25 at an Unleash the Beast Series event in Tulsa, Oklahoma. He then bucked off Marcus Mast in 2.61 seconds for a score of 46 points at the Velocity Tour Finals in Sioux Falls, South Dakota. José Vitor Leme then rode Woopaa for a very high ride score of 95.75 points at the PBR World Finals in Arlington, Texas. The bull for his part scored 46 points in this out. Woopaa won the 2020 American Bucking Bull (ABBI) Classic Champion title.

=== Season 2021 ===
These are the highlights from the PBR Unleash the Beast (UTB) Premier Series for the 2021 season. The world champion bull race required eight outs in the regular season and two in the world finals. The highest average bull score from these was the winner.

On February 27, José Vitor Leme rode Woopaa for 94.75 points in Fort Worth, Texas. On April 20, in Oklahoma City, Oklahoma, in the 15/15 Bucking Battle, Woopaa had one of his 47 or higher point outs, earning a 47.25 point score when he bucked off Keyshawn Whitehorse in 2.14 seconds. The out brought him ahead of Chiseled into the No. 1 spot in the world champion bull race.

On May 3, in Omaha, Nebraska, during the 15/15 Bucking Battle, Woopaa earned his fourth 46-point and over score by bucking off Cody Nance in 3.88 seconds. Woopaa was scored 46 points, giving him a 46.45 point average on 5 outs so far this season. He had five buckoffs in a row. On July 27, in Cheyenne, Wyoming, Boudreaux Campbell rode Woopaa for a very high score of 95.25 points. Woopaa was the high-marked bull of the event, as he was scored a 46.5 bull score. He led the world champion bull race with a 46.46 point average.

On July 31, in Tulsa, Oklahoma, in the 15/15 Bucking Battle, an important record was broken. The reigning World Champion bull rider José Vitor Leme and Woopaa, the No. 1 PBR bucking bull were marked a very high ride score of 97.75, a new record for highest score in PBR history. The PBR Premier Series' previous highest-marked score was 96.5, which had been achieved four times. The last time was 1997 PBR World Champion Michael Gaffney for 96.5 points in Nampa, Idaho, riding 3-time world champion bull Little Yellow Jacket in 2004. Leme proffered that it was one of the best days of his career. He also noted that it was the same arena (BOK Center) where future 2-time PBR world champion J.B.Mauney rode Bushwacker for 95.25 points in 2013. Leme was marked 49.75 points for his part in the ride score; almost perfect with 50 points being the maximum; a record high score. Woopaa's score of 48 is the 10th best on the tour. Leme also tied 1999 PBR world champion Cody Hart for most 90-point rides for one season, with 16. This ride was featured in Sports Illustrated magazine.

On August 15, in Little Rock, Arkansas, in the 15/15 Bucking Battle, Boudreaux Campbell rode Woopaa for 93.75 points, after having rode the bull twice previously for over 95 points, and won the 15/15 Bucking Battle. On August 29, in Fort Worth, Texas, Paulo Lima made a qualified ride on Woopaa for a score of 95.25 points. Woopaa was scored over 47 points. Woopaa had been marked 47 points four times or higher. He continued to lead the world champion bull race. He was the only multiple 47-point bull this season. Other bulls with a 47-point score were Chiseled and Ridin' Solo.

On October 3, in San Antonio, Texas, Woopaa and Dalton Kasel made a qualified ride of 96.75 points, for the second-highest scored ride in PBR history. Woopa was scored 47.25 points. On October 19, the PBR had completed the first list of bucking bull qualifiers. PBR Livestock Director Cody Lambert had chosen 146 bulls for the World Finals. The qualifiers had to have had eight regular season outs and two outs from the World Finals. The No. 1 bull, Woopaa had a score average of 46.94 in his eight best outs. Also, Woopaa was ridden in 7 of 10 outs on the UTB season. His average ride score was 95.57 points. The second-highest score average went to Chiseled who appeared to be serious competition for Woopaa. with an average of 46.38.

Woopaa was the number one bull heading into the World Finals. He had a world average score of 46.94 bull points. This season Woopaa monopolized the bull standings. When there were only three events left to go, it would have to take some very high scores for the contenders and some very low scores for Woopaa for anyone to overtake him. According to Wilson, his bull would carry that 46.94 point score into the finals because San Antonio was his last event until the World Finals. "On paper, it looks like Woopaa is running away with it," Laramie shared. "But I can't rest easy because H.D. Page and Chiseled are right there behind us, and they never give up. I really think it's going to come down to who we draw at the Finals. Woopaa looks better and scores higher the longer the rider stays on board. Chiseled seems to score high when he dumps a rider off quickly. We'll just have to see how it all comes down!" Chiseled was in 2nd place. Chisled was the 2019 ABBI Classic Champion, the Reserve PBR World Champion Bull, and the PRCA Bucking Bull of the Year. HD Page said it was Woopaa's race to lose. Even if Woopaa had a mediocre out, he would still win; he was that far ahead.

==== PBR World Finals ====
These are the results from the PBR UTB World Finals.

This year, the PBR World Finals took place at T-Mobile Arena, in Las Vegas, Nevada. For his first of two finals outs, Woopaa bucked off Daylon Swearingen in 3 seconds for 45 points during Round 2. Chiseled had Junior Patrick Souza in 4.91 seconds for a bull score of 46 points. This brought Chiseled a bit closer to Woopaa and still alive for the championship. On the final day, Sunday, November 7, Woopaa needed 43 points or better in his second out to outdo Chiseled and win the PBR World Finals.

Woopaa and 2020-2021 PBR World Champion José Vitor Leme were matched up for Woopaa's final out. Leme was in pain due to some injuries, but Woopaa's owner Barker was on the back of the bucking chutes, and he whispered to Leme, "Let's go break the record". As he grinned, Leme smiled back. They broke another record by scoring 98.75 points, which is now the highest ride score in PBR history. Woopaa's bull score was a very high one of 48.75 points, the second highest bull score in history. He also won the Bull of the PBR World Finals title. Leme became the first rider in PBR history to score a perfect ride score of 50 points. Leme predicted the outcome, and named Woopaa one of the greatest bulls in history. They beat their previous record. In Tulsa, 100 days earlier, they had set a record of 97.75 points.

Woopaa was awarded $100,000 for World Champion Bull, $25,000 for Bull of the World Finals, and $25,000 for being ranked No. 1 bull of the regular season. He finished this season with a 46.93-point average. He came out 0.58 points over Chiseled, who became the Reserve World Champion. Chiseled had now been second place two seasons in a row. During this season, there were nine bull scores of 47 points or more. Woopaa scored 47 or higher six times. Of those six times, two of them were over 48 points. PBR Livestock Director, Cody Lambert said that "he just shows up and does what he has to do". Woopaa ended the season number one with a world bull average score of 46.93 points. Chiseled finished second with world average bull score of 46.35 points. Woopaa's score of 48.75 set a record; for any bull ridden eight seconds, it is the highest score. Woopaa had 12 outs this season. He was ridden eight times. His average ride score was 95.94. His lowest score was 45 bull points. Cody Lambert summed up his athlete abilities: "You can stack any bull of an era up and Woopaa would best them in many ways."

On December 6, Woopaa lost two of his world champion bull contenders for the 2021 race. H.D. Page announced the retirement of Sweet Pro's Bruiser earlier this year, and Chad Berger announced the retirement of Smooth Operator.

=== Season 2022 ===
==== Unleash the Beast Series ====
These are the highlights from the 2022 season of the UTB. The 2022 World Champion Bull would have the top six regular season outs and two outs from the World Finals. The winner would have the highest average bull score. This differed from the 10 outs required in previous seasons due to the shortened season.

On January 24, in Duluth, Georgia, Woopaa put up a 46.5 point score for his first appearance of the new season by throwing off Chase Dougherty in 3.21 seconds. On February 14, in Oklahoma City, Oklahoma, Woopaa bucked off Austin Richardson for 46.75 points in 4.14 seconds. He was rebounding from a subpar score of 44 during the 15/15 bucking battle the previous night.

During February 21, comparisons were drawn between Woopaa and Ridin' Solo regarding the World Champion Bull race. Woopaa won the match two years ago for the ABBI World Champion Classic Bull. Ridin' Solo had competed at a higher level recently, scoring higher bull scores such that the two are closer in the race; owner Cord McCoy had Ridin' Solo ready to challenge Woopaa.

On February 26, in Little Rock, Arkansas, Woopaa was ridden by Manoelito de Souza, Jr. for a score of 92.75 points. On March 13, in Glendale, Arizona, Woopaa managed to throw off a determined Derek Kolbaba at 6.99 seconds. Woopaa was marked 46.5 points for this buckoff. On March 14, in Glendale, Arizona, Woopaa scored 46.5 points, which made him even with Ridin' Solo.

On March 25, during the 15/15 Bucking Battle in Albuquerque, New Mexico, Woopaa bucked off Mason Taylor in 2.89 seconds, and received 45.5 points. Two days later on March 27, Woopaa was successfully ridden by João Ricardo Vieira in the Championship Round to win the regular Albuquerque event. Vieira was awarded a 94.25 rider score, while Woopaa was awarded a 45.75 bull score.

On April 3, in Sioux Falls, South Dakota, Woopaa took the lead of the world champion bull race back in his favor. He bucked off Daylon Swearingen in 5.85 seconds in the 15/15 Bucking Battle. The bull, however, seemed to almost stop at the end of the out. Stock contractor Laramie Wilson said he would rest him so he would be fresh for his next event. That would be in Tulsa, Oklahoma on April 15–16. Woopaa was 7-2 in outs at this point. He was also boasting a 46.17 point average, and was only 0.04 points ahead of Ridin' Solo. Woopaa had bucked four of five of the past events, so Wilson felt a rest was due.

On April 15 weekend, Woopaa was in attendance at the Tulsa, Oklahoma UTB event. His owners bucked him twice this weekend. Laramie Wilson stated that it was due to Ridin' Solo beating them, and not wanting to go to the final two UTB regular season events of the year in Nampa, Idaho, and Billings, Montana. Austin Richardson drew Woopaa in Round 1 and rode Woopaa for 94.5 points. Woopaa was scored 46.25 bull points. In the Championship Round in Tulsa, Dalton Kasel was rematched with Woopaa. The previous year, Kasel won the UTB event in San Antonio, Texas, on Woopaa by scoring 96.75, the third-highest score in PBR history. However, the rematch in Tulsa went Woopaa's way, bucking off Kasel in 7.20 and receiving a 46-point bull score. Woopaa's World Champion Bull race average increased to 46.25 points. He now lead Ridin' Solo by 0.04 points.

On April 18, Woopaa and Ridin' Solo were separated by .08 points in the world champion bull race. Woopaa was slightly ahead in the lead. This was after the weekend event at the PBR Express Ranches Classic. Lambert commented that the two were the current favorites for the race. "I really like both of those bulls. I think Woopaa is better because he doesn't mess up as much. Cord (McCoy) has done such a good job with Ridin' Solo. He has gotten the most out of him. Laramie has done a great job with Woopaa, but Cord took one that couldn't get out of the chute." Woopaa has a 46.29 world champion bull average which put him ahead of Ridin' Solo in Tulsa, Oklahoma. His two outs there allowed him to drop two scores from his average. Those outs were the ones previously outlined herein with Austin Richardson and Dalton Kasel. Wilson planned to rest Woopaa until the finals. McCoy planned to bring Ridin' Solo to Billings, Montana, in two weeks.

==== PBR World Finals ====
After many years of taking place in Las Vegas, Nevada, during the autumn, the PBR World Finals moved to Dickies Arena in Fort Worth, Texas, during the spring. Woopaa and Ridin' Solo headed into these World Finals tied for the lead. They split the regular-season bonus with Ridin' Solo's owners. The world champion race came down to the top six regular season outs and two finals outs.

Round 2 on May 14 was a draft round, meaning riders got to choose their bulls by the order of which they placed in Round 1. After placing high in the first round, Dalton Kasel chose to ride Woopaa again. The bull would buck him off, but would only score 43.25 points; up to that point, his lowest bull score of the year. Ridin' Solo would be successfully ridden by Josh Frost, scoring 92.75 points, while the bull was given 45 points. At this point, Ridin' Solo retook the lead for the PBR World Champion Bull race, but by just 0.03 points.

During Round 4 on May 19, Woopaa was matched against 2002 PBR world champion Ednei Caminhas, bucking him off in 3.86 seconds, and rebounded with a 45.25 bull score. However, Ridin' Solo bucked off Ezekiel Mitchell in 3.35 seconds, and received a 47-point bull score in the process. Ridin' Solo had extended his lead to 0.44 points.

During the World Finals' Championship Round on May 22, Woopaa bucked off Luciano de Castro. However, the bull got fouled during the ride and performed poorly. He received 41.75 points, the lowest bull score of his career. As a result, Castro was awarded a re-ride and Woopaa's chance of winning a second consecutive world championship was ended. Ridin' Solo bucked off João Ricardo Vieira in 4.80 seconds, and received a 47-point score, winning the 2022 PBR World Champion Bull title. He beat Woopaa by 0.69 points.

==== Team Series ====
On September 18, Woopaa was ridden by Chase Outlaw of the Oklahoma Freedom for 94.50 points during the final ride of the Freedom's hometown event, Freedom Fest, in Oklahoma City. The team had already won the event, but Outlaw's ride on Woopaa put an exclamation point on their hometown victory. Woopaa for his part was marked 46 points on the out.

=== Season 2023 ===
==== Unleash the Beast Series ====
On December 4, 2022, Woopaa was successfully ridden by 2016 PBR world champion Cooper Davis for 91.75 points in the Championship Round to win the second event of the 2023 UTB season in St. Louis, Missouri. The bull was marked 44.50 points for this out.

On December 10, 2022, Woopaa was ridden by Sandro Batista in the Championship Round of the third event of the 2023 UTB season in Minneapolis, Minnesota, for 91.25 points, while Woopaa was given 44.25 points.

On January 29, 2023, Woopaa was ridden by Thiago Salgado in the Championship Round of the ninth event of the 2023 UTB season in Indianapolis, Indiana, for 88.25 points. Woopaa was given 43 bull points.

On March 12, 2023, Woopaa was rematched with José Vitor Leme in the Championship Round of the fifteenth event of the 2023 UTB season in Milwaukee, Wisconsin. He bucked him off in 6.39 seconds and received a bull score of 45.5 points. Altogether, Woopaa and Leme matched up four times, and this fourth rematch was the only time in which the bull bucked off the rider. This would also turn out to be the final out of Woopaa's bucking career.

== Retirement ==
On March 20, 2023, it was announced by Woopaa's owners that he was officially retired and would now stand at stud for breeding with cows. At the age of six, he was retired relatively early compared to other superstar bucking bulls.

Larry Barker, Woopaa's owner, died on January 8, 2026, at the age of 74.

=== Career summary ===
On October 13, 2021, a comparison was made between Woopaa and Bushwacker by the PBR. His record breaking bull score in Tulsa for 97.75 pushed his season average bull score to 46.68 points. That would be just under Bushwacker's average of 46.86 when winning his second world title.

== Awards ==
- 2020 ABBI World Champion Classic Bull
- 2021 PBR World Champion Bull
- 2021 PBR Bull of the World Finals

== Achievements ==
Woopaa has lifetime earnings over $350,000. He has the highest regular season average in history. He has the highest ride score in PBR history with José Vitor Leme of 98.75 points, the second-highest ride score in PBR history with José Vitor Leme of 97.75 points, and the third-highest ride score in PBR history with Dalton Kasel of 96.75 points.
