= João Ricardo Vieira =

Brazilian bull rider

João Ricardo Vieira da Silva (born July 28, 1984, in Itatinga, São Paulo, Brazil) is a Brazilian former professional rodeo cowboy who specialized in bull riding. From 2013 to 2026, he was a top contestant in the Professional Bull Riders (PBR) circuit, qualifying for the PBR World Finals every year. From summer 2022 through spring 2025, he rode for the Texas Rattlers in the PBR Team Series. The Texas Rattlers won the 2023 PBR Team Series championship title. From July 2025 to April 2026, Vieira rode for the Florida Freedom. In May 2026, he returned to riding for the Rattlers.

== Early life and career ==
Vieira grew up on a farm outside Itatinga, São Paulo, where his father managed land and livestock. At age 17, he was attending college with dreams of becoming a veterinarian, when a rodeo coach noticed his athleticism and introduced him to the sport of bull riding. Vieira immediately fell in love it. He assured his mother he would finish veterinary school, which he eventually did. After earning his degree, Vieira traded the prospect of a veterinary career for professional bull riding. He rode in Brazil's circuits, including PBR Brazil. He eventually moved to the United States in the early 2010s, where he worked his way up to the main PBR circuit.

Vieira was the 2013 PBR Rookie of the Year. In March 2014, after winning the Built Ford Tough Series (BFTS) Iron Cowboy event at AT&T Stadium in Arlington, Texas, he attempted to ride PBR World Champion bull Bushwacker for a $1 million bounty, but was quickly bucked off. Vieira is featured in the Netflix six-part docuseries Fearless on Brazilian professional bull riders. He won the bull riding title at the 2016, 2019 and 2020 editions of The American Rodeo at AT&T Stadium in Arlington, Texas. In 2020, he won the Monster Energy Buck Off at the Garden at Madison Square Garden and rose to the #1 PBR ranking in the world for a second time, the first being in 2015. This occasion also marked the first time the new trophy for this event, a miniature replica of Arturo Di Modica's Charging Bull sculpture, was presented to the winning rider at the event.

Vieira was second in the PBR world standings heading into the 2020 PBR World Finals. A few days before the start of the event, Vieira posted a video to his Facebook and Instagram accounts, where he stated that he had tested positive for COVID-19, and as a result would not be able to compete at the World Finals. He still ended up finishing 2nd in the PBR world standings that year.

The day after the conclusion of the 2022 PBR World Finals, the inaugural PBR Team Series season draft was held at Texas Live! in Arlington, Texas. Vieira was selected to ride for the Texas Rattlers. In late September 2022, the Texas Rattlers won the event at Thunder Days in Ridgedale, Missouri; the hometown event of rival team, the Missouri Thunder. Two weeks later, the Rattlers won their own hometown event at Rattler Days in Fort Worth, Texas. The very next weekend, the Rattlers won their third event in a row at Ridge Rider Days in Glendale, Arizona; the hometown event of rival team, the Arizona Ridge Riders. The Rattlers ended up in second place during the regular season. As a result, them and regular-season champions, the Austin Gamblers, received first-round byes and did not compete during the first day of the Team Series Championship. The Rattlers ended up finishing in third place at the conclusion of the inaugural PBR Team Series Championship.

In September 2023, the Rattlers won Thunder Days for the second year in a row. Also, at Thunder Days, Vieira recorded his 400th career qualified ride, becoming only the eighth rider in PBR history to do so. Later in early October of that year, the Rattlers won their own hometown event at Rattler Days for the second year in a row as well. In late October of that year, the Rattlers succeeded in making it to final round of the Team Series Championship against the Austin Gamblers. The Rattlers ended up defeating the Gamblers to win the PBR Team Series championship title. Vieira himself was crowned the event MVP, as he was the best performing individual rider of the Championship event.

In 2024, the Texas Rattlers were eliminated after the second day of the Team Series Championship.

In January 2025, the Texas Rattlers defeated the Austin Gamblers to win the PBR Monster Energy Team Challenge presented by Camping World at the Unleash the Beast Series (UTB) event in Houston, Texas. In April of the same year, the Rattlers again defeated the Gamblers to win the Monster Energy Team Challenge at the UTB event in Nampa, Idaho.

In the 2025 offseason between the UTB and Team Series tours, Vieira's contract with the Texas Rattlers had expired. As a result, he became an unsigned free agent and was picked up by the Florida Freedom to now ride for said team beginning that summer.

The Florida Freedom were the 2025 PBR Team Series regular-season champions. As a result, they, as well as second-place Austin Gamblers and third-place Texas Rattlers (Vieira's previous team) received first-round byes and automatically qualified for the second day of the Team Series Championship. The Freedom and Gamblers were eliminated after the second day of the event.

In mid-February 2026, the Florida Freedom defeated the Nashville Stampede to win the Monster Energy Team Challenge at the UTB event in Pittsburgh, Pennsylvania. The following week, the Freedom defeated the Carolina Cowboys to win the Monster Energy Team Challenge at the UTB event in Jacksonville, Florida. In March, the Freedom defeated the New York Mavericks to win the Monster Energy Team Challenge at the UTB event in Little Rock, Arkansas. Vieira ended his cycle with the Florida Freedom after the end of the 2026 UTB regular season in April. He then returned to riding for the Texas Rattlers.

The Rattlers finished fifth during the 2026 Team Series regular season. On the first day of the Team Series Championship, they defeated the Kansas City Outlaws to move on to the second day of competition. On the second day, the Rattlers were defeated by the Austin Gamblers, but came back to the Last Chance Game, where they eliminated the Missouri Thunder and Carolina Cowboys to move on to the third and final day of competition. On the third day, the Rattlers were defeated by eventual Championship winners the Nashville Stampede, who became the first PBR team to win a second championship. In the game to see who would finish third, the Rattlers were again defeated by the Austin Gamblers. Vieira retired from bull riding following the conclusion of this event.

== Personal life ==
Vieira resides in Decatur, Texas, with his family.
