= PBR Global Cup =

The PBR Global Cup was a bull riding team competition that was developed in 2017 by the Professional Bull Riders (PBR) organization and ran through 2022. It was intended to give the winning country the ability to say they had the best bull riders. Previously, there was a similar team event called the PBR World Cup that the PBR ran from 2007 to 2010, but this new event was not a continuation of the previous one. The PBR Global Cup consisted of teams from five countries including Australia, Brazil, Canada, Mexico, and the United States.

A different country held the team event each year as this was an annual event. The host country retained a competitive advantage. The best riders in each team were matched against the best riders from other teams. The contest was a series that continued until one country held all five pieces of the Global Cup, which included the horn and the native soil of each nation. Only one country could claim the "Toughest Nation on Dirt."

== Competition ==
=== Competition description ===
The PBR Global Cup was an annual event. Each team rode with a uniform that represented their respective country. The hosting country each year was granted an advantage. For the events in Edmonton and Sydney, that advantage was twice the number of competitors as the visiting teams. When the date for the first-ever edition of the event in the U.S. was announced, the PBR debuted a new format. In place of an increased roster, Team USA would field two teams, Eagles and Wolves. Making modern sports history, the Wolves team was announced to be composed exclusively of Native American bull riders.

At stake for the home team was their piece of the five-part Global Cup trophy which was a horn and their national soil. The home team had to win the event to successfully keep their trophy piece and native soil. Otherwise, the visiting team who won the event was awarded these items. The competition continued until one nation captured all five horns for the trophy−including the native soil−of each country. That country laid claim to the title, "The Toughest Nation on Dirt."

=== Trophy and native soil ===
The trophy was composed of five individual bull horns that represented each country. Taken as a whole, the trophy represented the collective spirit of this worldwide competition. Each country's bull horn piece of the trophy also included a vessel that held its native soil. At each event's opening ceremonies, was a presentation where all shared in viewing the host's riders depositing their dirt into their trophy piece. Following the presentation, the battle for the horn piece commenced. Each team protected their native soil as a matter of pride and honor for their country.

=== Competition format ===
The event was a two-day international competition which featured 14 riders from the host country against seven riders from each of the visiting countries. The home country was intentionally given a home town advantage with twice as many bull riders. Each team also had head coaches and assistant coaches.

Competitors earned money based on their team's performance. First place split $400,000 among themselves while the last place team earned $42,000. The individual rider who scored the most points combining his multiple rides received a bonus, while the rider with the highest-scored individual ride also received a bonus.

== Annual events ==
=== 2017 inaugural event ===
The competition format for the inaugural PBR Global Cup was very different from a traditional bull riding event. There were two days of competition. Each team attempted to score up to 14 qualified rides. The winning team was decided by the highest combined score. Coaches made all the riding decisions. The winning team was determined by points. Each qualified ride was judged up to 100 points. The total of all qualified ride points was combined for the total points earned. The team with the highest number of points became the winner, in this case, Team USA had the most points with 1,026.75 points. Team USA's riders rode 12 bulls out of 18 total outs (trips out of the bucking chute) and had one disqualification for a bulls ridden ratio of 12-18-1 (qualified rides-outs-disqualified). For first place they earned the top prize money of $400,000 and, of course, the Canadian horn piece of the Global Cup Trophy.

In 2017, the inaugural event was hosted from November 9 through 11 at Rogers Place in Edmonton, Alberta, Canada. The event paid out the second largest prize amount in North America, with only the PBR World Finals paying out more. By the end of the event, Team USA had become the winner. Team USA consisted of 2016 PBR World Champion Cooper Davis, Derek Kolbaba, Brennon Eldred, Cole Melancon, Stormy Wing, 2009 PBR Rookie of the Year Cody Nance, 2012 PRCA World Champion bull rider Cody Teel and was coached by two-time PBR World Champion Justin McBride.

==== Winning statistics ====
2017 Event Statistics
Year	Place Earned	Country	Team Leader	Bulls Ridden Ratio	Bulls Ridden Point Total	Money Earned	Trophy Piece Earned
2017	First	United States	Cooper Davis	12-18-1	1,026.75	$400,000	Canadian Horn
2017	Second	Brazil	Rubens Barbosa	11-18	927.50	$87,500	N/A
2017	Third	Canada	Lonnie West	10-32	838.50	$70,000	N/A
2017	Fourth	Australia	Cliff Richardson	7-18	599.25	$599.25	N/A
2017	Fifth	Mexico	Michael Gaffney	3-18	253.75	$42,000	N/A

=== 2018 event ===
In 2018, the next event was hosted in the Qudos Bank Arena in Sydney, New South Wales, Australia, from June 9 through 10. 14 of Australia's top cowboys competed to win the event on their home turf.

The prizes that the PBR paid out in Australian were a record $750,000 for that country. Qudos Bank Arena is a first-rate facility situated in Sydney Olympic Park, and is formerly known as the Sydney Super Dome, which completed construction in 1999. It formerly hosted the PBR Australia Finals since 2010. The general manager of PBR Australia said that this venue has also hosted the Olympic Games, and that it is very fitting to host this event in the largest city in Australia.

For Australia, they chose their competition format, and they announced it in February 2018. Each team featured three competitors. Those competitors were based on the final 2017 world standings for the series that started in Canada the previous November.

- Australia: Lachlan Richardson, Aaron Kleier, and Troy Wilkinson
- Brazil: Eduardo Aparecido, Kaique Pacheco, and José Vitor Leme
- Canada: Dakota Buttar, Jordan Hansen, and Brock Radford
- Mexico: Edgar Durazo, Francisco Morales, and Juan Carlos Contreras
- United States: Jess Lockwood, Derek Kolbaba, and Cooper Davis

Each visiting team was composed of seven bull riders in Sydney. Coaches chose the riders. Team Australia, same as the home team inaugural event, benefited from the host team advantage, and had 14 bull riders. Australia's additional 11 bull riders were chosen by 1998 PBR World Champion Troy Dunn, their coach. The PBR chose the coaches for this event and they were as follows:

- Australia: Troy Dunn
- Brazil: Renato Nunes
- Canada: Aaron Roy
- Mexico: Gerardo Venegas
- United States: Justin McBride

McBride returned to coach the Canadian team, while Dunn, Nunes, and Venegas made their coaching debuts for their respective countries. Each had previously competed as professional bull riders before being selected as team coaches.

Lastly, the competition was based on the best 12 qualified rides. The team with the highest aggregate score when the event concluded won the trophy with the Canadian horn and also received the Australian horn. In this event, the Brazil team won the trophy.

==== Winning statistics ====
2018 Event Statistics
Year	Place Earned	Country	Team Leader	Bulls Ridden Ratio	Bulls Ridden Point Total	Money Earned	Trophy Piece Earned
2018	Fourth	United States	Justin McBride		924	$52,500	N/A
2018	First	Brazil	Renato Nunes		1,006.5	$400,000	Australian
2018	Third	Canada	Aaron Roy		986.75	$64,500	N/A
2018	Second	Australia	Troy Dunn		1005.75	$75,000	N/A
2018	Fifth	Mexico	Gerado Venegas		501.25	$40,750	N/A

=== 2019 event ===
The third leg of the PBR Global Cup took place on February 9 and 10, 2019 at AT&T Stadium in Arlington, Texas, United States. For this event, the United States was split into two teams: the Eagles and the Wolves (an all-Native American squad). Team Brazil won their second straight Global Cup at the Arlington stop.

=== 2020 event ===
On February 15 and 16, 2020, the PBR Global Cup again visited AT&T Stadium in Arlington, Texas, marking the first time a global PBR competition had visited the same venue in consecutive years. The United States was again split into two teams, the Eagles and the Wolves. The competition was won by the USA Eagles.

=== Cancelled 2021 event ===
The 2021 Global Cup was scheduled to take place April 16 and 17 at T-Mobile Arena in Las Vegas, Nevada. However, due to each of the PBR countries having different protocols during the ongoing COVID-19 pandemic, the event was ultimately cancelled.

=== 2022 event ===
The Global Cup returned to AT&T Stadium in Arlington, Texas for a third, non-consecutive year. Unlike previous Global Cups where the event spanned two days, the 2022 edition of the Global Cup was a one-day event held on March 5 and instead of seven riders for each visiting country and 14 for the home country, the number of riders was shortened to five for each visiting country and 10 for the home country (five riders each for USA Eagles and USA Wolves). It was once again won by Team USA Eagles.

The PBR Global Cup has since been discontinued.

== Tracking ==
=== Annual placements ===
Year	Host	Champions	Runners-up	3rd place	4th place	5th place	6th place
2017	(Canada) Edmonton	United States	Brazil	Canada	Australia	Mexico	
2018	(Australia) Sydney	Brazil	Australia	Canada	United States	Mexico	
2019	(United States) Arlington	Brazil	(United States) USA Eagles	(United States) USA Wolves	Australia	Mexico	Canada
2020	(United States) Arlington	(United States) USA Eagles	Australia	Brazil	Canada	Mexico	(United States) USA Wolves
2022	(United States) Arlington	(United States) USA Eagles	Brazil	Mexico	Australia	Canada	(United States) USA Wolves

=== Medal table ===
Rank	Nation	Gold	Silver	Bronze	Total
1	United States (USA)	3	1	1	5
2	Brazil (BRA)	2	2	1	5
3	Australia (AUS)	0	2	0	2
4	Canada (CAN)	0	0	2	2
5	Mexico (MEX)	0	0	1	1
Totals (5 entries)		5	5	5	15
