= Luke Snyder (bull rider) =

American bull rider (born 1982)

Personal information
- Nickname: Cool Hand Luke
- Born: Luke Snyder; October 6, 1982 (age 44)

Sport
- Sport: Rodeo
- Event: Bull riding
- Turned pro: 2000
- Retired: 2013

Achievements and titles
- Highest world ranking: 2001 PBR World Finals Champion; 2001 PBR Rookie of the Year

Luke Snyder (born October 6, 1982) is an American former professional rodeo cowboy who specialized in bull riding, and competed in the Professional Bull Riders (PBR) circuit. In 2001, he won both the PBR Rookie of the Year and World Finals event titles. In 2022 and 2023, he was the co-head coach and general manager of the Missouri Thunder in the PBR Team Series. In 2024, he left his position as co-head coach, but remains as general manager.

== Early and personal life ==
Luke Snyder was born on October 6, 1982, and is originally from Raymore, Missouri. He began riding steer at age 9, and moved to bulls around 13 or 14 years old. His father Mike pulled his rope for him at the amateur events until he went professional at 18.

Snyder decided that after marrying his girlfriend Jennifer Manna in 2012, that 2013 would be his last season. Snyder also said he and Manna recently bought a home in Springfield, Missouri, and planned to start a family. As of 2022, he and Manna are divorced. His special interests include team roping, snowboarding and surfing.

== Contestant career ==
Snyder emerged onto the PBR scene as an 18-year-old Rookie of the Year and PBR Bud Light Cup World Finals Champion in 2001. He competed in the Built Ford Tough Series (BFTS) throughout his career. He earned $263,000 from his two wins at the Finals and finished the season with $348,561 in earnings. In 2011, in Las Vegas, Nevada, Snyder won close to $220,000 when he won the Last Cowboy Standing event, which also was the 300th event of his career. In front of 6,011 fans and a pay-per-view audience, Snyder rode Cooper Tires Wild & Out for 90 points in the progressive-elimination event. Snyder earned $16,500 for the round and moved to first place from 31st in the season earnings race with a total of $240,000. He scored 88 points on Slim Chance. He scored 90.5 points on Braveheart to tie for second place in Round 2. Snyder's $216,500 payout was the highest one-day payout of the 2011 PBR BFTS season. It was also the second highest in history. Snyder's place in the PBR finals was then guaranteed.

Nine-time Professional Rodeo Cowboys Association (PRCA) world champion cowboy Ty Murray had "wondered what a rider like Snyder, who has struggled near the cut line for much of the season, thought about going up against a rider like Valdiron de Oliveira, whose riding average is nearing 80 percent". As it turned out, he was the only rider who rode 3 of his bulls. "It was unbelievable to see Luke Snyder just come out of nowhere and dominate," said Murray in his weekly Podcast. "He made three fantastic rides on three really good bulls, and I think it surprised a lot of people." That weekend, he also just became the third rider to compete in 300 BFTS events.

In 2012, he was featured as part of a five-man team for Ford Truck's Built Ford Tough Invasion.

Snyder is known for his record of competing in 275 consecutive major PBR BFTS events. His streak started when he made his BFTS debut in 2001 and continued until he missed the Iron Cowboy Invitational event in 2010 because he did rank not high enough to compete. Prior to Snyder, now retired bull rider J.W. Hart who earned the "Iron Man" moniker owned the record with 197 events when he competed in his 198th event. Snyder received his nickname when a sponsor with a line of titanium jewelry came to use "Titanium Tough" as a marketing tool.

Snyder had many notable rides throughout his long career that they couldn't all be included, but here are some of the more memorable ones. In March 2001, at an event in Fort Worth, Texas, he scored 93 points on the bull Hollywood, whose bull score was 45.5. +99 Hollywood is a ProBullStats Hall of Fame bull. In September 2001, he scored an 89.5 point ride on Mr. Juicy whose bull score was 45 points.

At the World Finals in October 2001, Snyder was considered to be competing in his rookie year. As noted previously, he won the finals event and rookie of the year award. He rode five bulls at the event, which is considered quite a feat. He rode Say La Vee, for 89 points; the bull scored 44. Then he rode Slick Willy for 90 points while the bull scored 43.76. Next came Mighty Joe Young and he rode him for 88 points while the bull received 43.5. Dodge Rep came next and Snyder scored 89 points while the bull scored 43.76. The last ride was the most notable, Snyder rode Clayton's Pet for a very high score of 93.50, and the bull also scored high with 46 points. Clayton's Pet is another ProBullStats Hall of Fame bull. At the PBR Finals in October 2003, Snyder scored 90 points on a bull named McNasty; the bull scored 44.75 points.

In February 2001, at an event in Columbus, Georgia, Snyder rode Perfect Storm for 90 points and the bull scored 45. Perfect Storm is ranked 9th in the ProBullStats historical ranking and very high season average scores. Snyder rode the bull again in January 2002 but was bucked off in 4 seconds; the bull scored 46.5 points. The bull known as Werewolf or Werewolf Snuff Snyder crossed paths with three times. The bull is in the ProBullStats Hall of Fame. The record is 1-3 in favor of the bull. When they met in 2002 at the PBR Finals and in 2003 in Anaheim, California, the bull won. Finally, in March 2004, in Fresno, California, Snyder rode the bull, making 94 points, his highest career ride. The bull scored 47 points, one of the bull's highest scores as well. A bull Snyder never rode, but worth mentioning is Mossy Oak Mudslinger, a World Champion and Brand of Honor bull. Snyder made it to the 4 second mark each time.

Snyder rode a son of Bodacious named Bo Howdy in Greenville, South Carolina, in March 2005, and scored 87.50 points. The bull scored 43.50. Another bull that Snyder met up with a few times was Evil Forces. He rode him three times out of four. He had scores of 85, 88.50, and 90. He met up with the bull Walk the Line twice and rode him both times. In Albany, New York, in January 2008, he scored 90 points while the bull scored 44.25. In Nampa, Idaho, he scored 91 points and the bull 45. Another notable bull he rode was HeeGee BeeGee whom he met up with at an event in Oklahoma City, Oklahoma, in February 2012, for 89.75 points, and the bull was 44 points. Snyder met up with the 2012 World Champion Bull Asteroid in Pueblo, Colorado, in the BFTS 15/15 Bucking Battle. He lasted 1.88 seconds, and the bull scored 44.75 points. Another bull that Snyder met up with several times, well four actually, was Highway 12. He was a bull owned by contractor Mesa Pate who was a PBR short round who also made it to finalist for 2010 Bucking Bull of the Year in 2010. Their matchup score was 1-3 in the bull's favor. The only time Snyder rode him was in Thackerville, Oklahoma, in September 2012, for 85.75 points; the bull scored 42.75 points.

On March 24, 2012, in Albuquerque, New Mexico, at the second ever 15/15 Bucking Battle, Snyder rode the bull Party All the Time for 90 points to win the event. Snyder competed in front of a sold-out crowd at the Pit. Snyder rode just after Silvano Alves scored 89.75 points on High Octane Hurricane to take the lead. Snyder had ridden Jack Daniel's Tennessee Honey earlier for 74.75 points, but was offered a reride, which he took. The 15/15 Bucking Battles pit the 15 top riders against the 15 top bulls.

The most notable bull Snyder attempted four times and failed four times was the icon himself, Bushwacker. The first time was in San Antonio, Texas, at an event in August 2011, and he lasted 4.26 seconds. The bull scored 46.25 points. The second time was in Wichita, Kansas, in September 2011, and he lasted 2.90 seconds. Bushwacker scored a high 47 points. The third time was in Kansas City, Kansas, in March 2012, and he bucked off in 3.85 seconds. Bushwacker scored 46.25 points. His last attempt was in St. Louis, Missouri, in February 2013, and he was bucked off in 198 seconds. Bushwacker scored another high 47 points.

In February 2013, in Kansas City, Missouri, in a sold-out Sprint Center, the hometown Snyder took home the victory as the only cowboy to clock a ride in this 15/15 Bucking Battle. Snyder scored 91.50 points on the K-C Bucking Bulls' King Lopez. Snyder had attempted this bull twice before without success. "I felt awesome," Snyder said. "All these years I've come to Kansas City and done OK, so to give all of my friends and family something like that is just a good feeling." In October 2013, in Hollywood, Florida, at the Cooper Tires Invitational, Snyder attempted the bull My Kinda Party, on whom he did not make the whistle. He got hit by bull and sustained a concussion after getting bucked off at 3.46 seconds.

The last bull mentioned Snyder had a little history with, meeting up with him six times. Charlie Bull Ware and Snyder had a 2-4 record in the bull's favor. Snyder first attempted the bull in March 2011 and his last attempt was October 2013. He rode the bull for two qualified rides, the first was Portland, Oregon, in January 2012, for 89 points; the second was in Nampa, Idaho, for 90 points. Director of Livestock Cody Lambert talked about the PBR World Finals for 2012 and mentioned two bulls who would be there that were getting up there in age. One was 2007 World Champion Chicken on a Chain, and the other was Charlie Bull Ware. According to the ProBullStats statistician, Slade Long, the bull has been a fan and rider favorite his entire career. He entered the 2012 finals with over 100 outs at all levels, a rare feat. "He's got a lot of them on the ground," said Lambert, referencing the growing list of riders who have bucked off Charlie Bull Ware. "He's a good little bull and, I think, this will probably be his last year too because he has been around for a long time."

In 2013, after competing professionally in the PBR for 13 years, Snyder officially retired from bull riding after the PBR World Finals and three PBR Australia events. After retirement, Snyder still planned to host the Luke Snyder Invitational, and perhaps other Touring Pro Division events. He also mentioned the possibility of another one in Missouri. He planned to be involved with the PBR, Bass Pro Shops, and Winstar World Casino as well.

=== Major accomplishments ===
- PBR Rookie of the Year (2001)
- PBR World Finals Event Champion (2001)
- PBR BLC Oakland, California Champion (2002)
- PBR BFTS Portland, Oregon Champion (2005)
- PBR BFTS Nampa, Idaho Champion (2008)
- PBR BFTS Last Cowboy Standing Champion (2011)
- PBR BFTS Boise, Idaho Champion (2012)
- PBR 13-time World Finals Qualifier (2001–2013)

=== Summary ===
Snyder competed on the PBR’s elite series for 13 years, from 2001 through 2013. On March 26, 2004, in Fresno, California, Snyder rode the bull Werewolf Snuff for 94 points for a career high. The bull was scored a very high 47 points. The ride score was the top score of the event.

He has 950 outs (trips out of the chute) from 370 events in a 13-year career. This includes 28 90-point rides, 19 Top-5 finishes, 45 Top-10 finishes, and five event wins. He ranks number 13 or 15, depending on the source, on the all-time money earners list, have won more than $1.7 million by the end of his career. His career PBR earnings are just over $1.7 million. He also had 913 BFTS outs, which was a record in 2013.

== Post-career ==
In 2022, Snyder, along with friend and fellow former PBR bull rider Ross Coleman, became a co-head coach of the Missouri Thunder; one of eight bull riding teams in the PBR Team Series, which debuted that year. It runs from the summer to autumn and concludes with the Team Series Championship at T-Mobile Arena in Las Vegas, Nevada. Snyder also became the team's general manager. In July of that year, the Thunder won the very first Team Series event in Cheyenne, Wyoming. The Thunder were eliminated after the first day of the inaugural Team Series Championship.

In 2023, the Thunder ended up finishing in fourth place at the Team Series Championship.

Since 2024, Snyder remains the Missouri Thunder's general manager, while Coleman is the team's single head coach. The Thunder were eliminated after the second day of that year's Team Series Championship.

In January 2025, the Missouri Thunder defeated the Kansas City Outlaws to win the PBR Monster Energy Team Challenge presented by Camping World at the Unleash the Beast Series (UTB) event in Sacramento, California. In February of the same year, the Thunder once again defeated the Outlaws to win the Monster Energy Team Challenge at the UTB event in Indianapolis, Indiana. In March, during the UTB event in Little Rock, Arkansas, the Thunder defeated the Outlaws to win the third straight and final Monster Energy Team Challenge for the Missouri teams in 2025.

In October 2025, the Missouri Thunder succeeded in making it to the final round of that year's Team Series Championship against the Carolina Cowboys. The Cowboys defeated the Thunder to win the 2025 PBR Team Series Championship title.

In January 2026, the Missouri Thunder defeated the Arizona Ridge Riders to win the Monster Energy Team Challenge at the UTB event in Milwaukee, Wisconsin. The following week, the Thunder defeated the Oklahoma Wildcatters to win the Monster Energy Team Challenge at the UTB event in Tampa, Florida. In early February of the same year, the Thunder defeated the Kansas City Outlaws to win the Monster Energy Team Challenge at the UTB event in Salt Lake City, Utah. In late February, the Thunder defeated the Texas Rattlers to win the Monster Energy Team Challenge at the UTB event in Bridgeport, Connecticut. In March, the Thunder defeated the Florida Freedom to win the first round of the Monster Energy Team Challenge Semifinals at the UTB event in Albuquerque, New Mexico, which moved them on to the Championship event in April in Tacoma, Washington. In Tacoma, the Thunder defeated the Austin Gamblers to win the inaugural Monster Energy Team Challenge Championship.

The Missouri Thunder finished in first place during the 2026 Team Series regular season. As a result, they received a first-round bye and automatically qualified for the second day of the Team Series Championship. They were defeated by the Arizona Ridge Riders, but came back to the Last Chance Game, where the Texas Rattlers eliminated both the Thunder and Carolina Cowboys.

== Honors ==
Snyder was inducted in the Missouri Sports Hall of Fame in 2014. So many young bull riders credit the film 8 Seconds and its subject Lane Frost as a major inspiration to them, and Luke Snyder is no exception. Snyder says he credits what is the spirit of the film as a major influence on him when he was 11 years old. He was inducted into the PBR Ring of Honor in 2015, joining the three major characters of the film, Lane Frost, Tuff Hedeman, and Cody Lambert. He is the 42nd rider to join the Ring of Honor. "The dang whole cast of "8 Seconds" has that ring," Snyder said, "and when I watched that movie when I was just a little kid – it was about the time that I was starting when it came out – that made me want to be a bull rider".
