= Cody Custer =

American bull rider (born 1965)

Cody Mark Custer (born August 30, 1965) is an American former professional rodeo cowboy who specialized in bull riding. He competed in the Professional Rodeo Cowboys Association (PRCA), Bull Riders Only (BRO), and Professional Bull Riders (PBR) circuits. In 1992, he was one of the co-founders of the PBR and won both the BRO and PRCA bull riding world championship that same year.

== Early life ==
Custer was born in Kingman, Arizona, to Jim and Dixie Custer. He began riding bulls at age 13 and won Wickenburg High School championships in 1983 and 1984, before joining the PRCA in 1985.

== Career ==
Custer qualified for the National Finals Rodeo (NFR) in Las Vegas every year from 1987 through 1992, when he won the PRCA bull riding world championship. His notable rides included a 94-point score on Growney Brothers' Wolfman in Round 10 of the 1991 NFR and a 90-point ride on Skoal Pacific Bell at the 1988 Grand National Rodeo in San Francisco.

Custer was one of the 21 co-founders of the Professional Bull Riders (PBR) in April 1992. He also competed in the now-defunct Bull Riders Only (BRO) circuit and won the BRO world championship later in the autumn that year before winning the PRCA world championship at the NFR in December.

Custer was the PRCA Turquoise Circuit bull riding champion from 1989 through 1992, the Dodge National Circuit Finals Rodeo bull riding champion from 1990 through 1992, and the 1992 Original Coors Rodeo Showdown bull riding champion. He also won bull riding titles at rodeos including California Rodeo Salinas, Cheyenne Frontier Days, the Cody Stampede, the Grand National Stock Show & Rodeo, and Pendleton Round-Up.

Custer also worked as a riding stand-in for Lane Frost's character in the 1994 film 8 Seconds.

After a series of injuries following his 1992 championship season, Custer returned to qualify for the NFR in 1998 and 1999. He also qualified for the PBR World Finals in 1994, 1996, and 1998 through 2003. He qualified for the NFR again in 1998 and 1999, then focused solely on PBR competition beginning in 2000.

In 2001, Custer finished eighth in the PBR world standings, his highest year-end PBR ranking. He retired from professional bull riding in 2003.

In a 2014 article for The New Yorker, Dana Goodyear described Custer's career as lasting about 20 years and reported that his injuries included a collapsed lung, broken ribs, a broken jaw, shoulder and knee surgeries, and multiple concussions.

== Honors and post-career ==
Custer was inducted into the PBR Ring of Honor in 2003, the ProRodeo Hall of Fame in 2017, and the Bull Riding Hall of Fame in 2019.

After retiring from competition, Custer had served as PBR director of judging and on the organization's Rules and Regulations Committee for several years. He has also led bull-riding clinics around the United States and worked with young riders on both riding skills and conduct outside the arena.

In 2025, the Western Sports Foundation named Custer the recipient of its Ted Weise Memorial Award, which recognizes service, mentorship, and faith in the western sports community.

== Personal life ==
Custer's younger brother Jim Bob was also a professional rodeo cowboy. He specialized in saddle bronc riding and bull riding and competed in the PRCA and PBR. He qualified for the PBR World Finals in 1994 and 1996. Since retiring as a contestant, he now works as a professional rodeo announcer.

Cody's oldest son Aaron, 18, was killed in a car accident on August 16, 2011, one day before he was set to start his first semester at Southwestern Oklahoma State University as a member of the rodeo team. He was a passenger along with his friend, Benton Drury, 18, who was also killed. Their friend, Shane Frey, 19, was the driver and survived the ordeal with internal injuries. A scholarship fund was established in honor of Aaron Custer.

Cody's younger son Brett started his bull-riding career professionally in the PRCA in the late 2010s to early 2020s. He has since transitioned to the semi-professional circuit.

Cody has spoken publicly about his Christian faith. In a profile published by the Christian Broadcasting Network, he discussed the role of faith in his life after professional bull riding.
