= Boudreaux Campbell =

American bull rider

Personal information
- Nickname: Boudreaux
- Born: Jason Byron Campbell Jr. August 15, 1998 (age 28) The Woodlands, Texas, U.S.
- Height: 5 ft 11 in (1.80 m)
- Weight: 155 lb (70 kg)
- Website: Boudreaux Campbell

Sport
- Sport: Rodeo
- Event: Bull riding
- Turned pro: 2017

Achievements and titles
- Highest world ranking: 2017 PRCA Bull Riding Rookie of the Year; 2020 PRCA Xtreme Bulls Tour Champion; 2020 PBR Rookie of the Year; 2020 PBR World Finals Event Champion; 2021 PBR Velocity Tour Finals Event Champion

Jason Byron Campbell Jr., better known as Boudreaux Campbell, (born August 15, 1998) is an American professional rodeo cowboy who specializes in bull riding. He has competed in the Professional Rodeo Cowboys Association (PRCA), Championship Bull Riding (CBR), and Professional Bull Riders (PBR) circuits. In 2022 and 2023, he rode for the Carolina Cowboys in the PBR Team Series. In 2024 and 2025, he rode for the Missouri Thunder. As of 2026, he rides for the Florida Freedom.

== Early and personal life ==
Campbell was born in The Woodlands, Texas. As an infant, his father gave him the nickname "Boudreaux" and it stuck. According to Campbell, it is very rare for people to refer to him by his birth name, Jason. When he was 12, he and his family moved to Crockett, Texas. He went to Lovelady High School.

Campbell was four years old when he started mutton busting. He won the Texas junior and high school state bull riding championships. He also enjoys heeling as a team roper.

== Career ==
Campbell was the year-end bull riding champion for the semi-pro Cowboys Professional Rodeo Association (CPRA) in 2015 and 2016. He then turned pro the following year. He qualified for the CBR World Finals in 2017 and 2018. He was the 2017 PRCA Bull Riding Rookie of the Year and qualified for the PRCA's National Finals Rodeo (NFR) from 2017 through 2021. He was also the 2020 PRCA Xtreme Bulls tour champion.

In 2020, Campbell qualified for the PBR World Finals and scored the most points at the event, clinching both the PBR World Finals event average and the 2020 PBR Rookie of the Year title. He won the 2021 PBR Velocity Tour Finals event and again qualified for the PBR World Finals that year.

The day after the conclusion of the 2022 PBR World Finals, the inaugural PBR Team Series draft was held at Texas Live! in Arlington, Texas. Campbell was selected to ride for the Carolina Cowboys. The Cowboys won the fifth event of the 2022 PBR Team Series season at Gambler Days in Austin, Texas; the hometown event of rival team, the Austin Gamblers. The Cowboys were eliminated after the second day of the Team Series Championship at T-Mobile Arena in Las Vegas, Nevada.

Campbell again qualified for the PBR World Finals in 2023.

The Carolina Cowboys were eliminated after the first day of the 2023 PBR Team Series Championship.

In early 2024, before the start of the PBR Team Series season in the summer, Campbell was traded to the Missouri Thunder.

Campbell qualified for his fourth PBR World Finals in 2024.

In 2024, the Missouri Thunder were eliminated after the second day of the Team Series Championship.

In January 2025, the Missouri Thunder defeated the Kansas City Outlaws to win the PBR Monster Energy Team Challenge presented by Camping World at the Unleash the Beast Series (UTB) event in Sacramento, California. In February of the same year, the Thunder once again defeated the Outlaws to win the Monster Energy Team Challenge at the UTB event in Indianapolis, Indiana. In March, during the UTB event in Little Rock, Arkansas, the Thunder defeated the Outlaws to win the third straight and final Monster Energy Team Challenge for the Missouri teams in 2025.

Campbell qualified for his fifth PBR World Finals in 2025.

In October 2025, the Missouri Thunder succeeded in making it to the final round of the 2025 Team Series Championship against the Carolina Cowboys (Campbell's previous team). The Cowboys defeated the Thunder to win the 2025 PBR Team Series Championship title.

Following the 2025 Team Series season, Campbell was dropped from the Missouri Thunder's protected roster. He decided not to sign to the team's reserve roster, making him an unsigned free agent.

After several years of riding mainly in the PBR, Campbell decided to return full-time to the PRCA in 2026. However, in August of that year, he signed to ride in the Florida Freedom's reserve roster in the PBR Team Series. Following an injury at the Team Series event in Glendale, Arizona, in October, Campbell missed the rest of the season, including the Team Series Championship event in November.
