= J.B. Mauney =

American bull rider (born 1987)

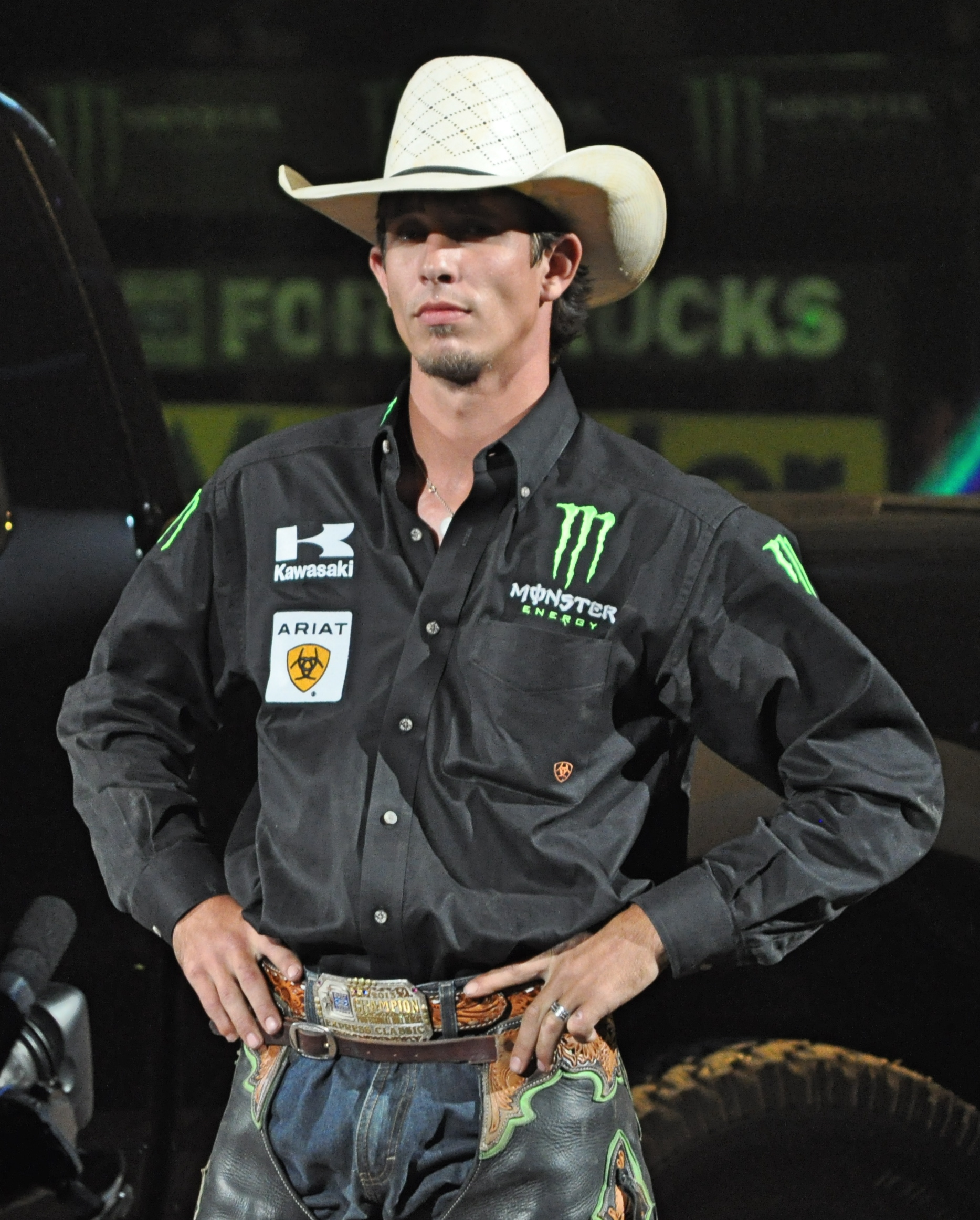
- Mauney in 2013

Personal information
- Full name: James Burton Mauney
- Nicknames: J.B.; The Dragonslayer
- Nationality: American
- Born: January 9, 1987 (age 39) Charlotte, North Carolina, U.S.
- Home town: Mooresville, North Carolina, U.S.
- Height: 5 ft 10 in (178 cm)
- Weight: 140 lb (64 kg)
- Spouses: Lexie Wigley (m. 2012; div. 2015) Samantha Lyne (m. 2017)
- Children: 2
- Parent: Phil Lyne (father-in-law)

Sport
- Country: United States
- Sport: Rodeo
- Handedness: Left (Note: Mauney occasionally rode right handed when recovering from left hand injuries.)
- Event: Bull riding
- Circuits: CBR (2005–2006); PBR (2005–2021); PRCA (2009; 2019–2023)
- Turned pro: 2005
- Retired: 2023

Achievements and titles
- World finals: 2005 CBRWF: Qualified; 2006 CBRWF: Qualified; 2006 PBRWF: 25th; 2007 PBRWF: 4th; 2008 PBRWF: 3rd; 2009 PBRWF: 1st; 2010 PBRWF: 33rd; 2011 PBRWF: 7th; 2012 PBRWF: 22nd; 2013 PBRWF: 1st; 2014 PBRWF: 2nd; 2015 PBRWF: 2nd; 2016 PBRWF: 5th; 2017 PBRWF: 22nd; 2018 PBRWF: 11th; 2019 PBRWF: Qualified; 2020 PBRWF: 23rd
- National finals: 2021 NFR: 14th
- Highest world ranking: PBR: 1st (2013, 2015); CBR: 9th (2006); PRCA: 12th (2021)
- Personal bests: 95.25 pts vs. Bushwacker; August 17, 2013
Medal record
Bull riding
Representing United States
PBR World Cup
Gold medal – first place	2008 Chihuahua	Team
Gold medal – first place	2009 Barretos	Team

James Burton Mauney (/ˈmuːni/; born January 9, 1987) is an American former professional rodeo cowboy who specialized in bull riding. He was a top contestant in the Professional Bull Riders circuit (PBR) for several years, winning the PBR World Championship in 2013 and 2015. Mauney was known for choosing the most difficult bulls, explaining "If you want to be the best, you've got to ride the best." During the later years of his career, he was nicknamed "the Dragonslayer" for his ability to conquer several of the toughest bulls he was matched against. He is considered one of the greatest bull riders of his generation, and the ninth greatest bull rider in the history of the PBR.

At the very beginning of his career, Mauney rode in both the PBR and Championship Bull Riding (CBR) circuits, before deciding to ride full-time in the PBR by early 2006. He won the PBR Rookie of the Year title that same year. During the last few years of his career, he competed full-time in the Professional Rodeo Cowboys Association (PRCA) circuit. From 2024 to February 2026, he was the head coach of the Oklahoma Wildcatters in the PBR Team Series.

== Early life ==
James Burton Mauney was born on January 9, 1987, in Charlotte, North Carolina. He is of French descent on his father's side. At the age of 13, he rode his first "big" bull. He attended Lake Norman High School in Mooresville, North Carolina.

== Contestant career ==
Mauney won the Southern Rodeo Association (SRA) junior all-around title in 2002 and the adult all-around title in 2004.

He joined the PBR in 2005 and the PRCA in 2009. In his first year of competition, he won the 2006 PBR Rookie of the Year.

Mauney is one of only five riders to get a qualified ride on Asteroid which he accomplished on the BFTS in San Antonio, Texas, in August 2012, for a score of 93.50 points. Asteroid, the 2012 World Champion bull, earned a high score of 46.25 points.

Mauney competed the first several years of his professional career with a helmet. However, by 2013, he was riding with a cowboy hat.

In August 2013, he became one of only three riders (during the bull's entire career) to stay on Bushwacker for the full eight seconds. He achieved this on the Built Ford Tough Series (BFTS), the elite series of the PBR, for a score of 95.25 points (in Tulsa, Oklahoma).

Mauney won the PBR world championship title twice, in 2013 and 2015. He also won the PBR World Finals event twice, in 2009 and 2013.

Mauney won the bull riding title during first edition of RFD-TV's The American in 2014.

On November 5, 2016, Mauney made PBR history by being the first bull rider to reach the $7 million mark in career earnings.

In 2017, Mauney suffered a significant injury to his right arm, requiring surgery to install a screw and 13 anchors. Mauney's career has been plagued with many injuries, but he has continued to pursue professional bull riding history.

"It's part of being a cowboy", he stated in an interview with Monster Energy, "when you crawl in to a chute, nothing else matters. You tie your hand and you don't give up until you hit the dirt". In an interview for the PBR, Mauney said "What gets me is when people who don't ride bulls for a living try to tell me when it's time to hang it up".

In 2019, Mauney tied another two time world champion Justin McBride for the most televised wins within the 26-year history of the PBR. By the end of 2020, he had qualified for the PBR World Finals 15 consecutive times in his career (2006 through 2020).

Since 2020, Mauney has been part owner of Ultimate Bullfighters (UBF), an American freestyle bullfighting organization.

After struggling to find success during the first few events of the 2021 PBR season, Mauney decided to try his luck in the PRCA. Although he joined the PRCA in 2009, he only competed sporadically at PRCA events from 2009 to 2020. In July 2021, Mauney announced that he would step away from riding in the PBR to focus solely on riding in the PRCA and try to qualify for the National Finals Rodeo (NFR). He would qualify for and compete at his first NFR in December of that year.

Mauney was well on his way to qualifying for the NFR again in 2023. However, on September 6, during the PRCA Xtreme Bulls Division 2 event at the Lewiston Round-Up in Lewiston, Idaho, Mauney was bucked off by the bull named Arctic Assassin and landed on his head. The wreck ended up breaking his neck and he had surgery two days later, which required a rod, plates, and screws, as well as the removal of a disc. Four days later, Mauney announced his retirement from bull riding. "This is not the way I wanted to go, but everything happens for a reason", he said.

In early 2024, Arctic Assassin, now also retired, was purchased by Mauney and moved by his owners to spend his remaining days on Mauney's ranch in Stephenville, Texas.

== Coaching career ==
In 2024, Mauney returned to the PBR to be the head coach of the Oklahoma Wildcatters; one of two new teams for the PBR Team Series that season. That same year, the PBR Team Series introduced the Ride-In Round. The event, which took place at the South Point Arena in Las Vegas, Nevada, had the bottom four teams from the regular season compete against each other to determine the final two teams who competed at the Team Series Championship at Las Vegas' T-Mobile Arena. The Nashville Stampede, along with the New York Mavericks moved on to the Championship event, defeating the Arizona Ridge Riders and Oklahoma Wildcatters. In 2025, the PBR discontinued the Ride-In Round, meaning all 10 teams will compete at the Team Series Championship.

In March 2025, the Oklahoma Wildcatters defeated the Arizona Ridge Riders to win the PBR Monster Energy Team Challenge presented by Camping World at the Unleash the Beast Series (UTB) event in Thousand Palms, California.

The Oklahoma Wildcatters were eliminated after the first day of the 2025 Team Series Championship event in October.

On February 20, 2026, Brandon Bates, a former PBR arena announcer and current general manager of the Oklahoma Wildcatters, announced that J.B. Mauney had stepped down as head coach of the team. Both parties had mutually agreed to part ways, as Mauney wished to spend more time with his family and his BuckTown XV Ranch where he raises bucking bulls and puts on bull riding events and schools for upcoming riders. He also uses it as a practice arena for bull riders. Mauney was replaced by Western Texas College rodeo coach Greg Rhodes as new head coach of the Oklahoma Wildcatters in April 2026.

== Legacy ==
The PBR and the fans consider Mauney a legend due to his records and accomplishments. In January 2018, he became the third bull rider to reach 500 rides on the PBR Premier Series when he rode All The Way Up for 87.25 points during Round 1 of the Monster Energy Buck Off at Madison Square Garden in January 2018. In addition to his two world championships, he has 32 Premier Series wins (tied for first with fellow PBR world champion Justin McBride) and has 75 90-point rides to his credit (the third most behind fellow PBR world champions Chris Shivers and José Vitor Leme). His total career earnings are over $7.6 million (combining both PBR and PRCA earnings). He also successfully rode all of the active PBR World Champion bulls during his PBR career, except Mossy Oak Mudslinger, Smooth Operator, and Woopaa.

Mauney was known for picking the rankest bull when there was a draw, especially in the championship round of most events. He and three-time world champion bull Bushwacker are known for being matched up 13 times. Mauney always picked Bushwacker in the elite rounds. Bushwacker never bucked in any rounds that weren't elite once he entered the BFTS. Mauney said, "If you are going to be the best, you've got to ride the best."

Fellow two-time PBR world champion Justin McBride said "he is in a class of his own, the best bull rider of his generation. As soon as the day he decides to be done he is headed straight to the Ring of Honor...he will forever be in the conversation as the greatest the PBR has ever seen".

== Head coaching record ==
Team	Year	Regular Season					Teams Championship				Team Challenge			
Team	Year	Won	Lost	Ties	Win %	Finish	Won	Lost	Win %	Result	Win	Lost	Win %	Finish
OK	2024	11	16	1	.411	8th	0	1	.000	Lost to Nashville Stampede and New York Mavericks in Ride-In Round	Not held			
OK	2025	11	24	0	.314	9th	0	1	.000	Lost to New York Mavericks in Play-In Game	1	2	.333	9th
OK	2026	—	—	—	—	—	—	—	—	—	0	3	.000	— (Note: Mauney resigned from the Oklahoma Wildcatters head coaching position on February 22, 2026.)
Total		22	40	1	.357		0	2	.000		1	5	.167	

== Accomplishments ==
Championships

- 2× PBR World Champion (2013, 2015)
- RFD-TV's The American Bull Riding Champion (2014)
- 2× PBR World Finals Event Champion (2009, 2013)
- 2× PBR World Cup Champion with Team USA (2008, 2009)
- PBR Touring Pro Division Champion (2006)
- SRA Adult All-Around Champion (2004)
- SRA Junior All-Around Champion (2002)

Qualifications

- National Finals Rodeo qualifier (2021)
- 15× PBR World Finals qualifier (2006–2020)
- 2× CBR World Finals qualifier (2005, 2006)

Awards

- PBR World Cup MVP (2009)
- PBR Rookie of the Year (2006)
- 6× Lane Frost/Brent Thurman Award (2007–2009, 2013–2015)
- PBR Top 30 – No. 9 (2023)

Hall of Fames

- Bull Riding Hall of Fame (Class of 2024)
- PBR Ring of Honor (Class of 2025)
- Iredell County Sports Hall of Fame (Class of 2025)

== Personal life ==
Mauney was married to Lexie Wigley from 2012 to 2015. In 2017, he married Samantha Lyne, a barrel racer and daughter of five-time PRCA world champion cowboy Phil Lyne.

On January 23, 2019, Mauney and his wife Samantha welcomed the birth of their first son. Mauney also has a daughter (born 2011) from a previous relationship.

Until as recently as 2019, Mauney and his family lived in Mooresville, North Carolina, where Mauney had spent most of his life. They then lived in Cotulla, Texas, for a few years. In late 2020, Mauney purchased a property in Stephenville, Texas, and in early 2022, he and his family relocated there.

Mauney was one of several celebrity cameos featured in the music video for country artist Ella Langley's song "Choosin' Texas", which was released on April 1, 2026.
