= José Vitor Leme =

Brazilian bull rider

Personal information
- Full name: José Vitor Leme Batista
- Born: August 15, 1996 (age 30) Ribas do Rio Pardo, Mato Grosso do Sul, Brazil
- Height: 5 ft 6 in (1.68 m) (2021)
- Weight: 139 lb (63 kg) (2021)

Sport
- Country: Brazil
- Sport: Rodeo
- Event: Bull riding

Achievements and titles
- World finals: 2017, 2021 and 2025 PBR World Finals Event Champion
- Highest world ranking: 2020, 2021 and 2025 PBR World Champion
- Personal best

José Vitor Leme Batista (born August 15, 1996) is a Brazilian professional rodeo cowboy who specializes in bull riding. He is the 2020, 2021 and 2025 Professional Bull Riders (PBR) World Champion, and holds the record on the bull Woopaa for the highest-scored ride in PBR history with 98.75 points. Since 2022, he has ridden for the Austin Gamblers in the PBR Team Series. He was the PBR Team Series Regular-Season MVP in 2022, 2023, and 2026. The Austin Gamblers won the PBR Team Series Championship title in 2024. Leme is one of three bull riders to have won three PBR World Championships; the other two being fellow Brazilians Adriano Morães (1994, 2001 and 2006) and Silvano Alves (2011, 2012 and 2014).

In 2023, Leme was ranked No. 5 on the list of the top 30 bull riders in PBR history.

== Background ==
José Vitor Leme Batista was born in Ribas do Rio Pardo, Mato Grosso do Sul, on August 15, 1996. As early as seven years old, he started riding calves. However, his parents separated and divested their bulls. Leme went to live with his mother, Sylvia. Thereafter, he became interested in soccer and played 11 years. He became a semi-professional player. He was also simultaneously learning karate. But being a bull rider was still his desire. In Brazil, most often an invitation is required for elite events. He finally got an opportunity when he was 18 years old. It was in Rochedo, near his mother Sylvia, who lived in Campo Grande. He pedaled six miles to the event and back to attend. His first ride, he got called for a slap.

That was the beginning of his bull riding career. He often had to walk or ride a bicycle to events. His father assisted him by buying some of his equipment. Leme improvised with equipment maintenance, traveling costs, and assorted other costs. Leme claims soccer has many moves that translate to bull riding. It was a hard road to get to the big tour.

== Career highlights ==
Leme was a semi-professional soccer player before entering the professional bull riding circuit. At 21 years of age, Leme came to the United States for the first time to compete in the PBR's Premier Series.

=== 2017 season ===
This season, Leme competed on the PBR Brazil tour. That was his debut tour season. He earned an above average score of 82.61. In the finals, he made a qualified ride, took first place, and won $29,743.62. He won three events that season. This included the PBR Brazil National Finals at the well-known Barretos Rodeo in Barretos, São Paulo, on August 17. He was named the PBR Brazil Champion and PBR Brazil Rookie of the Year. This earned him a spot on the PBR Velocity Tour Finals in the United States.

At the Velocity Tour Finals, he went 3 for 4. He placed 8th at the event, and won $1,800. He earned a spot in the PBR World Finals held at the T-Mobile Arena in Las Vegas. Through a five-day event, Leme rode six bulls in a row and won the World Finals event title, as well as the PBR Rookie of the Year title. This was a huge accomplishment for Leme, as he did not compete in any regular season events in the United States. At the World Finals, he won $416,000, of which $300,000 was the World Finals event champion bonus.

=== 2018 season ===
In this season, Leme competed on the PBR tour with outs from November 2017 through November 2018. On November 9 through 10, 2017, Leme competed at the PBR's inaugural Global Cup in Edmonton, Alberta, Canada, as a member of Team Brazil. He won $13,512.26 at the event. Though this event took place after the 2017 PBR World Finals and occurred during the 2017 calendar year, points won counted towards the 2018 PBR world standings. On December 16, 2017, at the Velocity Tour event in Kearney, Nebraska, he made a qualified ride, and earned $7,662.32 in winnings. On June 8 through 9, Leme again competed at the PBR Global Cup as a member of Team Brazil. The 2018 edition of the event took place in Sydney, New South Wales, Australia. He placed 10th in the event and won $46,772.03. On October 27, 2018, at the Velocity Tour event in Colorado Springs, Colorado, he earned $6,700 in winnings. He competed in the Velocity Tour Finals on October 31 and November 1, where he placed 8th and won $4,600. On November 7 through 11, he competed in the PBR World Finals, went 4 for 6, came in 2nd place, and earned $251,000 at the event.

=== 2019 season ===
In this season, Leme competed on the PBR tour the entire year with outs from November 2018 through November 2019. He started his season on the Velocity Tour, in Corpus Christi, Texas. On the Unleash the Beast Series (UTB), in New York City, he won his first event of the 15/15 Bucking Battle. Then, in March, he won the UTB event in Duluth, Georgia. In Sioux Falls, South Dakota, he also won that event, which moved him into first place in the PBR world standings. He lost the No. 1 position briefly, but after winning a couple more regular season events, won it back. Those events were in Anaheim, California, and Springfield, Missouri.

Leme competed in the Velocity Tour Finals, and went 2 for 3 to win the Velocity Tour Finals event average and year-end tour championship. On November 6 through 10, he competed at the PBR World Finals. Jess Lockwood was unstoppable. He put up four 90-point rides, which pulled him past Leme, who finished second in the final world standings. Leme led the tour in regular season 90-point rides with 11, round wins of 18, and qualified rides of 47. He won $119,333.33 at the World Finals.

=== 2020 season ===
In this season, Leme competed on the PBR's UTB series the entire year, with outs from January through November.

On August 22, at the UTB event in Salt Lake City, Utah, Leme rode Chiseled for 94 points.

On September 10–12, at the UTB event in Billings, Montana, Leme rode all five out of his five bulls over the weekend. He won the 15/15 Bucking Battle as well by riding World Champion bull Smooth Operator for 94.25 points. That was his eighth 90-point score of the season and the highest marked ride of the regular season. He got himself to No. 1 for the event by riding Zero Time in Round 3 for 89.75 points. He then rode Bad Decisions in the Championship Round for 89.75 points for the regular event win. Leme now had seven Premier Series wins this season. The record was eight, set by two-time PBR world champion Justin McBride in 2007. This brought closer to another record; he had 15 rounds won this season, while J.B. Mauney held the record with 19 rounds in 2013. Leme earned $40,575 for the weekend. He had increased his lead over the No. 2 spot held by Joao Ricardo Vieira.

On November 5–6, Leme competed at the Velocity Tour Finals in Sioux Falls, South Dakota, but unfortunately bucked off both his long round bulls.

==== PBR World Finals ====
In November, at the PBR World Finals at AT&T Stadium in Arlington, Texas, Leme clinched the world championship by covering Woopaa for 95.75 points in Round 3. This also garnered him the Lane Frost/Brent Thurman Award for highest marked ride of the PBR World Finals that year. At that time, that ride tied for the third-highest scored ride at a PBR World Finals. He won $1,080,500 this year for that title.

==== Season summary ====
He spent 17 out of 22 weeks as No. 1 in the PBR world standings, winning his first world championship. He also won seven UTB events, 16 rounds, had 44 qualified rides out of 65 outs, nine 90-point rides, a riding percentage of 67.69%, and $1.6 million in total earnings.

=== 2021 season ===
In this season, Leme competed from January through November. A new record for highest scored ride in PBR history was set in the summer of 2021, when Jose Vitor Leme rode Woopaa (owned by Barker Bulls and Laramie Wilson of Hookin' W Ranch) for 97.75 points in Tulsa, Oklahoma, during that event's 15/15 Bucking Battle. He also competed in the Velocity Tour Finals again. He also became a two-time PBR World Champion. He won $1,871,257.92 including $1,401,800 in the World Finals this year.

==== PBR World Finals ====
Leme started out this season this year by breaking an ankle. A few events prior to the World Finals, he also managed to re-injure his groin and sustain a core muscle injury. These injuries caused him to miss nine events. And yet, numerous records were broken during this season. The World Finals returned to T-Mobile Arena in Las Vegas. During round 1, Eli Vastbinder won this round with a 91-point ride on Manaba. 2016 PBR world champion Cooper Davis won second with 90.75 on Juju. Leme rode his first bull to place sixth.

Mexican rider Álvaro Álvarez won a wildcard spot to the World Finals as a result of being the highest placing international invitee at the conclusion of the Velocity Tour Finals. He won Round 2 by riding Detroit Lean for 92 points. Cody Teel was second in the round. He received a 91.75 pioint for riding Kid Knapper. Four others tied for fourth. Leme got his second ride of the week, finishing in ninth place.

In Round 3, No. 2 rider and 2018 PBR world champion Kaique Pacheco won with a 91.25 ride on First Down. Mason Taylor rode Walking Tall for 90.50 points and second place. Vastbinder was back again with 90 points to be fourth by riding Hell on the Red. He had just been injured earlier in that round. He rode that re-ride bull with those injuries. By this time, only Leme and Taylor had ridden all three of their bulls. Leme had ridden his third bull, finishing 14th.

In Round 4, Leme won the fourth round by riding WSM'S Jive Turkey for 92.50 points and increasing his lead for the world title. Following Leme was Mauricio Gulla Moreira. Marco Eguchi was third, and Vastbinder hung on for fifth. Again, it was just Leme and Taylor who had ridden all their bulls, going 4 for 4.

In Round 5, Vastbinder, who could barely walk or breathe, managed to ignore his injuries and ride Medicine Man for a 92.75 points for the round win. He made four 90-point rides in the World Finals. Leme rode his bull, Top Shelf for 91.25.

In the Championship Round, Leme rode Woopaa for 98.75, breaking the record for the highest scored ride in PBR history. Leme's rider score was a perfect 50 points, another record. Woopaa's bull score was 48.75, just a quarter point shy of the highest bull score in PBR history.

By winning, Leme became the second back-to-back PBR World Champion. He also became the seventh rider to win multiple PBR world championships. He rode Woopaa to break the highest scored PBR ride twice. He had first broken the record in Tulsa, Oklahoma, during the 15/15 Bucking Battle with 97.75. Leme won the world title by riding all six of his bulls at the World Finals. He, like J.B. Mauney, who did it in 2013, became one of two riders to win both the world title and World Finals event average by successfully riding all their bulls at the event. Leme successfully rode 49 bulls of 71 total outs this season. He tied the record with 2-time PBR world champion Justin McBride for most Premier Series event wins in a single season with eight, and also broke the record for most 90-point rides in a single season set by 1999 PBR world champion Cody Hart, who put together 16 during his championship season, while Leme put together 24. Leme was also now fifth in all-time money won by PBR riders with earnings over $5 million. Eli Vastbinder won Rookie of the Year. Woopaa won the World Champion Bull and Bull of the World Finals titles. The ABBI Classic World Champion Bull was Juju.

=== 2022 season ===
This season, the PBR changed the format of all their U.S. tours. For the Premier Series from the 2022 season on, the tour will run from the winter into the spring. The PBR World Finals occurred in May at Dickies Arena in Fort Worth, Texas.

==== Unleash the Beast Series ====
Leme's first UTB event of the season was in Duluth, Georgia, the fourth event of the season. Injuries sidelined him from participating in the first three events of the season. He bucked off Blue Duck in the first round in 3.92 seconds. For his next out two outs he bounced back. He rode Cold Chill for a ride score of 88.50 points in the second round. In the third round, he rode Mike's Motive for a score of 89.25 points. He placed third in the event.

In February, Leme competed at the UTB event in Milwaukee, Wisconsin. First, in Round 1, he bucked off Lonesome Fugitive in 4.26 seconds. His second bull, Tiger, he rode for 88 points. His third bull, Jag Metals Grand Theft, he rode for a high score of 92 points. At the UTB event in Oklahoma City, Oklahoma, Leme was back in form by riding Ridin' Solo for 94.75 points in the 15/15 Bucking Battle. This was his seventh 15/15 Bucking Battle win. He bucked off his other two bulls during the regular event: Tulsa Time in 2.33 seconds and Falcon Eddie in 4.71 seconds.

At the UTB event in St. Louis, Missouri, Leme rode T-Bone for 86.75 points. Then, he rode WSM'S Trail of Tears for 88.25 points. Lastly, he got bucked off Big Black in the Championship Round in 4.17 seconds. Also in February, Leme competed at the UTB event in Little Rock, Arkansas. In the first round, he rode Heart & Soul for 68.50, but was offered a re-ride, which he accepted. He then rode Choc Tease for a ride score of 89.75. In the second round, He rode Hang 'Em High for 90.25 points. Then, in the Championship Round, he rode Diddy Wa Diddy for 92 points.

In March, Leme competed at the UTB event in Glendale, Arizona. In Round 1, he bucked off Yadi in 4.62 seconds. In Round 2, he rode The Good Stuff for 85.50 points. Also in March, at the UTB event in Kansas City, Missouri, he rode Dang, Dang for 89.50 points. But then he bucked off Magic Potion in 1.59 seconds and Vanilla Ice in 2.81 seconds.

In April, at the UTB event in Tulsa, Oklahoma, Leme delivered a 3 for 3 ride effort. The final ride was another 90-point ride. This after an injury had taken him out of competition for two events. In Round 1, his score of 89.75 on God Bless America was second best. Then, he rode Casper for 88.5 points to advance to the Championship Round in second position. Yet another time he neglected to pick Woopaa for the event win. Rather, he took on I'm Legit Too and won the event with a very high 94-point ride. This brought a check of $46,348.14 and moved him from 6th to 4th place in the PBR world standings.

==== PBR World Finals ====
In May, during the PBR World Finals at Dickies Arena in Fort Worth, Texas, Leme successfully rode four of his bulls. This included two 90-point rides, which were 90.25 points on Lone Survivor in Round 2 and 92.75 on Norse God in Round 5. The latter of which Leme won the round on. However, in Round 6, Leme was bucked off by Crossover in 6.24 seconds and the bull stomped on his chest. This caused four rib fractures on his right side and a partial collapse of his right lung. As a result of his injuries, Leme was unable to finish the event. However, when the World Finals concluded, he ended up finishing fifth overall in the event and won $92,500. Leme also finished fifth in the final 2022 PBR world standings.

==== Team Series ====
The day after the conclusion of the 2022 PBR World Finals, the inaugural PBR Team Series season draft was held at Texas Live! in Arlington, Texas. Leme was selected to ride for the Austin Gamblers.

In mid-August, the Austin Gamblers clinched their first event title at the third stop of the 2022 PBR Team Series season in Anaheim, California, which was a "neutral site" event. The following week, the Austin Gamblers won their second consecutive Team Series event at Stampede Days in Nashville, Tennessee; the hometown event of rival team, the Nashville Stampede.

Leme won the inaugural PBR Team Series Regular-Season MVP award; being the individual rider that earned the most points during the Team Series regular season.

==== Team Series Championship ====
The Austin Gamblers were the regular-season champions. As a result, both them and second-place team, the Texas Rattlers, received first-round byes and automatically qualified for the second day of the PBR Team Series Championship at T-Mobile Arena in Las Vegas, Nevada, in November. The Gamblers were eliminated after the second day of competition.

=== 2023 season ===
==== Unleash the Beast Series ====
Leme missed the first five events of the 2023 Unleash the Beast Series season due to recovering from injuries sustained at the 2022 Team Series Championship. He made his return to the UTB series during the sixth event of the season in New York City on the first weekend of the 2023 calendar year. In Round 1, he rode Pickle Moonshine for 87.75 points. In Round 2, he rode Bad Decisions for 86.5 points. He was bucked off Choc Tease in Round 3, but rode Cliff Hanger for 92 points in the Championship Round to win the event. The following weekend at the UTB event in Chicago, Illinois, Leme rode Reinstate Hank for 83.5 points in Round 1. He then followed that up with a Round 2 winning ride on Knuckle Head for 87 points. In the Championship Round, he rematched with Cliff Hanger for 88.25 points and won his second consecutive UTB event. He had climbed to second in the world championship race.

During the tenth event of the UTB season in Sacramento, California, on the first weekend in February, Leme rode Havoc for 85.5 points in Round 1. He then rode Lil Hott for 89.5 points in Round 2 for the round win. In the Championship Round, Leme covered The Right Stuff for 87.5 points and won his third event of the season. He also climbed to first in the world championship race. At the following UTB event in Tulsa, Oklahoma, Leme rode Diamond in the Ruff for 88.75 in Round 1. He then rode The Show for 88.25 in Round 2. For the Championship Round, he matched up against I'm Legit Too; a bull he had faced five times previously and had successfully ridden the most recent four times they had matched up against each other. In this most recent rematch in Tulsa, the bull bucked him off in 5.97 seconds. Leme finished fifth in the event. The following weekend at the UTB event in Eugene, Oregon, Leme rode Chiseled, the 2020 and 2021 Professional Rodeo Cowboys Association (PRCA) Bull of the Year, for 88.25 points in Round 1. He then got bucked off by Punchy Pete in Round 2. His one score was enough to bring him back to the Championship Round. However, he decided to doctor out. Leme ended up finishing 12th in the event.

At the fifteenth stop of the UTB series in Milwaukee, Wisconsin, Leme covered Spirited World for 87.5 points in Round 1. He then rode Air Shift for 87 points in Round 2. In the Championship Round, Leme rematched with Woopaa. However, this rematch proved unsuccessful for Leme, as he was bucked off in 6.39 seconds. This would also be their final rematch and last out of Woopaa's bucking career, as he was retired by his owners after this out. Altogether, Leme and Woopaa matched up a total of five times, and this fifth and final rematch was the only one in which the bull bucked off the rider. Leme ended up finishing third in this event. At the following UTB event in New Orleans, Louisiana, Leme rode Hog Wild for 72.5 points in Round 1. Because of the bull's poor performance, Leme was offered a re-ride, but declined it. He then rode Bread Basket for 88.5 points in Round 2. In the Championship Round, he matched up with Fastfire and got bucked off in 4.57 seconds. He again ended up finishing in third place. Leme was injured during the Championship Round in New Orleans and would miss the last several UTB events of the regular season. As a result, he dropped to second in points in the world championship race.

Leme returned to competition during the final UTB event of the regular season in Louisville, Kentucky. In Round 1, he touched his bull, Hostage, in 1.24 seconds, thus disqualifying his ride. However, he won Round 2 by successfully covering Pneu Dart's Wild Card for 90 points. In the Championship Round, he rode Ivy League for 91 points, and finished second in the event. Leme remained in second in points for the world championship going into the PBR World Finals.

==== PBR World Finals ====
Kaique Pacheco, the 2018 PBR World Champion, was the points leader heading into the 2023 World Finals. However, an unfortunate series of events would end his hopes for a second world championship that year. During the second to last event of the UTB regular season in Tacoma, Washington, Pacheco fractured his right tibia and fibula; receiving surgery the day after the wreck. He missed the final UTB regular season event in Louisville, Kentucky, and after a lot of thinking and speaking with doctors, it was decided that he would not compete at the World Finals. This left the door wide open for Jose Vitor Leme in his pursuit of a record-tying third PBR world championship.

In Round 1 of the World Finals, Leme was bucked off by Blood Moon in 3.42 seconds. In Round 2, during his ride on JAGS Metals Grand Theft, his hand came out of the bull rope in 7.81 seconds. Then in Round 3, he got bucked off by Pearl's Ghost in 5.79 seconds.

With the first weekend of the World Finals completed, Leme had bucked off his first three bulls. He was a mere 74 points behind the injured No. 1, Kaique Pacheco. In Round 4, Leme was bucked off by Big Bank in 4.28 seconds. Then in Round 5, he successfully covered his first bull of the World Finals, when he was rematched with Pneu Dart's Wild Card for 88.5 points and tied with Marcus Mast for 5/6th in the round. Leme was now only 40 points behind Kaique Pacheco in the world championship race. In Round 6, Leme got bucked off by Big Johnny Reb in 3.49 seconds. Then in Round 7, he rebounded when rematched with JAGS Metals Grand Theft, the same bull that bucked him off in Round 2. Only this time, he rode him successfully for 90.25 points and placed second in the round to Josh Frost. Leme had regained the lead in the world championship race, but only by nine points. In the Championship Round, he was matched up with Yellowknife and his goal of winning a record-tying third PBR world title was quickly ended when the bull bucked him off in 1.8 seconds. Rafael Jose de Brito, the 2023 PBR Rookie of the Year and World Finals event champion had garnered enough points to also win the world championship. Leme ended up finishing eighth in the World Finals event average and second in the 2023 PBR world championship race.

==== Camping World Team Series ====
In 2023, Camping World became the PBR Team Series' title sponsor.

The Austin Gamblers won the first Team Series event of 2023 in Cheyenne, Wyoming, in late July. Leme was the MVP of the event.

The Gamblers later won the Team Series event in Anaheim, California, in mid-August. This was the second year in a row that the Gamblers won the event in said city.

Two weeks later, the Gamblers won their own hometown event at Gambler Days in Austin, Texas.

In late September, the Gamblers won Cowboy Days in Greensboro, North Carolina; the hometown event of rival team, the Carolina Cowboys.

In early October, Leme would win the Team Series Regular-Season MVP award for the second year in a row.

==== Team Series Championship ====
In late October, for the second year in a row, the Gamblers were the regular-season champions. As a result, both them and second-place team, the Kansas City Outlaws, received a first-round bye and automatically qualified for the second day of the PBR Team Series Championship. The Gamblers succeeded in making it into the final round of the Team Series Championship against the Texas Rattlers. However, the Rattlers would end up defeating the Gamblers to win the second annual PBR Team Series championship title.

=== 2024 season ===
==== Unleash the Beast Series ====
During the first event of the 2024 Unleash the Beast season in Tucson, Arizona, Leme was rematched against Hostage in Round 1 and rode him successfully for 88.75 points. In Round 2, he rode Lone Star for 82.75 points. In the Championship Round, Leme rode High Wire for 90.75 points and ended up finishing fourth in the event.

At the twelfth event of the UTB season in Los Angeles, California, Leme won Round 1 by riding Mud Train for 88.5 points. In Round 2, he bucked off Black Gold in 5.37 seconds. Leme's one qualified ride was enough to bring him back to the Championship Round, but he decided to doctor out due to injury. He ended up finishing sixth at the event.

Leme had only competed in six of the first 18 UTB events of 2024, as he had struggled with a groin injury for most of the season. In early April, he announced on his social media accounts that he would miss the remainder of the 2024 UTB series, including the World Finals. He would now turn his focus on rehabbing his injury in order to be ready for the upcoming Team Series in the summer. Leme was ranked 26th in the UTB standings at the time of his announcement.

==== Camping World Team Series ====
Leme returned in time for the Team Series season with the Austin Gamblers. In mid-October, at the Team Series Championship, the Austin Gamblers succeeded in making it to the final round for the second year in a row, only this time against the Carolina Cowboys. The Gamblers ended up defeating the Cowboys to win the 2024 PBR Team Series Championship title.

=== 2025 season ===
==== Unleash the Beast Series ====
During the second event of the 2025 UTB season in Ontario, California, Leme rode I'm Him for 87.5 points and tied for 5/6 place in Round 1 with Anderson de Oliveira. In Round 2, Leme rode HomeBru for 90.25 points for the round win. In the Championship Round, Leme rode Umm for 90.25 points to place second in the round, and ended up winning the overall event.

At the seventh event of the UTB season in New York City, Leme won Round 1 with an 89.75-point ride on Roc Wit It. However, he bucked off his next two bulls and finished 13th in the event.

At the tenth event of the UTB season in Pittsburgh, Pennsylvania, Leme rode Mr. Koolie for 87.50 points to tie for second place in Round 1 with Dawson Branton and Guilherme Valleiras. However, Leme was bucked off by Crazy Party in 2.11 seconds in Round 2 and failed to qualify for the Championship Round. He finished tied for 14th/15th place in the event with Guilherme Valleiras.

During the twenty-first event of the UTB season in Billings, Montana, Leme rode Rank Hank for 88 points in Round 1. In Round 2, he rode Vindicated for 87 points. In the Championship Round, Leme was bucked off by Ricky Vaughn in 3.74 seconds and finished fifth in the event. At the following UTB event in Nampa, Idaho, Leme rode Buckaroo for 87 points in Round 1. In Round 2, he rode Rank Hank for 88.25 points. Leme again attempted to ride Ricky Vaughn in the Championship Round. However, during the ride, the bull stumbled and jerked Leme forward, causing him to touch the bull before the eight seconds. As a result, Leme was awarded a re-ride. He was matched up against Lights Out and rode him for 88.25 points. Leme finished second in the event.

==== PBR World Finals ====
At the PBR World Finals, Leme successfully rode all four of his bulls in the Elimination rounds at Cowtown Coliseum in Fort Worth, Texas; Whiplash for 85 points in Round 1, Flapjack for 87.50 points in Round 2, Triple Aught for 89.25 points in Round 3, and Pegasus for 91.25 points in Round 4. He ended up winning the event and punched his ticket to the Championship rounds at AT&T Stadium in Arlington, Texas.

Leme won Round 1 of the Championship rounds by riding Ugly This for 88.75 points. He also won Round 2 of the Championship rounds by riding Oyster Creek Brawler for 90.50 points. He would go on to win Round 3 with 89.25 points on Lari's Speck, and tie the Round 4 win with Australian rider Brady Fielder with 91 points; Fielder rode Magic Hunter, while Leme rode Walk Hard. Both riders ended up tying for the Lane Frost/Brent Thurman Award, as it was the highest score of the World Finals.

Leme ended up winning the World Finals, as well as clinching his third PBR world championship. He joined fellow Brazilians Adriano Morães and Silviano Alves as the three bull riders to win three PBR world titles; Morães won his in 1994, 2001 and 2006, while Alves won his in 2011, 2012 and 2014. Leme also joined Robson Palermo, another fellow Brazilian, as the only two riders to win the PBR World Finals event three times; Palermo won it in 2008, 2011 and 2012, while Leme won it in 2017, 2021 and 2025. Leme also surpassed $8.3 million in career earnings, making him the richest rodeo athlete in history.

==== Camping World Team Series ====
The Austin Gamblers finished second in the 2025 PBR Team Series regular season. As a result, they, as well as regular-season champions Florida Freedom and third-place Texas Rattlers received a first-round bye and automatically qualified for the second day of the Team Series Championship. The Freedom and Gamblers were eliminated after the second day of the event.

Following the 2025 Team Series season, Leme's contract with the Austin Gamblers had expired, making him an unsigned free agent.

=== 2026 season ===
==== Unleash the Beast Series ====
During the seventh event of the UTB season in Sacramento, California, Leme won Round 1 by riding Dirty Honey for 89.2 points. In Round 2, he rode Nefarious for 88.3 points and finished sixth in the round. In Round 3, he was bucked off Fire Fight in 2.28 seconds. Leme qualified for the Championship Round, but opted out due to injury. He finished tied for eighth/ninth place with Daniel Keeping in the event.

During the 15th event of the UTB season in Albuquerque, New Mexico, Leme rode Crazy Sox for 89.65 points in Round 1 and finished fifth in the round. In Round 2, he rode Mo Money for 87.95 points to finish sixth in the round. In Round 3, he rode Felix for 90.75 points to finish second in the round. In the Championship Round, Leme touched Eyes On Me in 5.75 seconds, thus disqualifying his ride. He finished fifth at the event.

A few days before the start of the 2026 PBR World Finals, Leme announced on his social media that he would not compete at the event due to a groin injury. He was ranked 27th in the UTB standings at the time of his announcement.

A few days before the start of the 2026 PBR Team Series, it was announced that Leme had resigned to ride for the Austin Gamblers.

==== Team Series ====
In October, at the Team Series event in Kansas City, Missouri, Leme surpassed the record for most 90-point rides when he rode Moonlight Graham for 90.55 points. The record was previously held by two-time PBR world champion Chris Shivers, with 94 90-point rides. At the same event, Leme clinched his third PBR Team Series Regular-Season MVP title.

The Austin Gamblers finished second during the 2026 Team Series regular season. As a result, they received a first-round bye and automatically qualified for the second day of the Team Series Championship. They defeated the Texas Rattlers and moved on to the third and final day of competition. On the third day, the Gamblers were defeated by the Arizona Ridge Riders. In the game to see who would finish third, the Gamblers again defeated the Texas Rattlers.

== Awards ==
- 2017 PBR Brazil Rookie of the Year
- 2017 PBR Brazil Champion
- 2017–2020, 2022 PBR Global Cup Team Brazil member
- 2017, 2020, 2021, 2025 Lane Frost/Brent Thurman Award recipient
- 2017 PBR World Rookie of the Year
- 2017, 2021, 2025 PBR World Finals Event Champion
- 2018, 2019 PBR Global Cup Individual Rider Champion
- 2019 PBR Velocity Tour Champion
- 2019 PBR Velocity Tour Finals Champion
- 2020, 2021, 2022 Mason Lowe Award recipient
- 2020 PBR Touring Pro Division Champion
- 2020, 2021, 2025 PBR World Champion
- 2022, 2023, 2026 PBR U.S. Team Series Regular-Season MVP

== Records ==
- Most rounds wins in a season (21)
- Most 90-point rides in a season (24)
- First perfect 50-point rider score in PBR history
- Highest-marked PBR ride of all time (98.75 points)
- Most Premier Series event wins in a season (tied with 8)
- Most 90-point rides (96 as of November 2026)

== Personal life ==
Leme resides in Decatur, Texas, with his family.
