= PBR World Finals =

Annual bull riding championship held in Texas

- Most recent season or competition: 2026 PBR World Finals
- Association: Professional Bull Riders
- Classification: BLC (1994–2002); BFTS (2003–2017); UTB (2018–present)
- Sport: Bull riding
- Founded: 1994
- Competitors: 45
- Venues: Cowtown Coliseum; Fort Worth, Texas, U.S. Desert Diamond Arena; Glendale, Arizona, U.S.
- Most recent champion: (United States) Hudson Bolton (2026)
- Most titles: (Brazil) Robson Palermo (Brazil) José Vitor Leme (3 titles)
- Streaming partners: Paramount+ CBS Sports
- Sponsor: Pendleton Whisky

The PBR World Finals is the annual championship event for the premier series of the Professional Bull Riders (PBR), a professional bull riding organization operating in the United States, Canada, Brazil, and Australia. The winner, determined after eight rounds, is awarded $375,000, while the winners of the final four championship rounds each receive $75,000. At the conclusion of the event, the PBR World Champion is crowned and awarded $1 million.

The event was first held in 1994 following the formation of the PBR in 1992. Since its inception, the PBR World Finals has featured the top bull riders from the PBR's premier series competing for the world championship. The event has been held at several venues throughout its history, with its location and competition format changing over time. Currently the first four rounds are held at Cowtown Coliseum, with the championship rounds being held at Ariat Arena, both of which are located in Fort Worth, Texas.

The PBR World Finals is considered the culminating event of the PBR season. Riders accumulate points throughout the season to qualify for the event and compete for the PBR World Championship. The winner of the event is determined by the rider who accumulates the most points during the eight rounds of competition, with points awarded based on performance in each round.

== History ==
=== 1994–1999: Early years ===
The inaugural PBR World Finals were held in 1994, following the formation of the Professional Bull Riders (PBR) in 1992. The event was held at the MGM Grand Garden Arena in Las Vegas, Nevada, and established the World Finals as the culmination of the Bud Light Cup Series season. Ted Nuce won the inaugural World Finals event, while Adriano Morães became the first PBR World Champion.

In 1995, Troy Dunn became the first Australian to win the World Finals event. He also became the first rider to complete a perfect World Finals, going 5-for-5. Dunn won the event again in 1997, becoming the first two-time World Finals event winner. The 1995 World Finals also marked the introduction of the Touring Pro Division, which provided an additional pathway for riders to compete at the World Finals.

In 1999, the event moved to the Thomas & Mack Center. That same year, the World Finals produced one of the most notable rounds in PBR history. During Round 2, eight riders recorded scores of 90 points or higher. Chris Shivers and Terry Don West each scored 96 points, while Ty Murray recorded a 95.5-point ride on Red Wolf. The PBR later described the round as "the greatest night of bull riding."

=== 2000–2013: Expansion and international development ===
In 2000, the PBR introduced the World Champion's Exemption, allowing former PBR World Champions to compete in as many or as few regular-season events as they chose while remaining eligible for the World Finals.

During the 2001 World Finals, Chris Shivers tied the highest score in PBR history with his 96.5-point ride on Dillinger. That same year, Luke Snyder became the second rider to complete a perfect World Finals, going 5-for-5 and winning the event.

In 2004, Mike Lee became the first rider to win both the World Finals event and the PBR World Championship in the same season. In 2005, Guilherme Marchi became the first Brazilian rider to win the World Finals event. Brazilian riders subsequently became increasingly prominent at the World Finals.

In 2006, the PBR expanded its international presence through tours in Australia, Brazil, Canada, and Mexico. Riders from these tours subsequently received opportunities to compete at the World Finals, increasing the event's international representation.

In 2008, Robson Palermo won the World Finals event for the first time. He won the event again in 2011 and 2012, becoming the first three-time World Finals event winner and the first rider to win the event in consecutive years.

In 2009, J.B. Mauney became the first rider to go 8-for-8 at the World Finals, as well as the third rider to complete a perfect World Finals. He repeated the feat in 2013, going 6-for-6, becoming the first rider to record two perfect World Finals performances. In 2013, Mauney would win the World Finals event and his first PBR World Championship.

=== 2014–2021: Growth and milestones ===
In 2014, Silvano Alves became the first Brazilian rider to record a perfect World Finals performance, going 6-for-6 to win the World Finals event. He also won his third PBR World Championship, tying Adriano Morães for the record at the time. Alves became the fourth rider to win both the World Finals event and the PBR World Championship in the same season.

In 2016, the World Finals moved to the newly opened T-Mobile Arena. That same year, Ryan Dirteater became the fourth rider since 2000 to ride every bull at the World Finals, going 6-for-6 to win the event.

On November 5, 2017, Jess Lockwood became the youngest PBR World Champion in history at 20 years old. That same year, José Vitor Leme won the World Finals event with a perfect 6-for-6 performance and was named PBR Rookie of the Year.

The World Finals were temporarily relocated outside Nevada in 2020 due to the COVID-19 pandemic restrictions. The event was moved to Arlington, Texas, and held at AT&T Stadium, marking the first time the World Finals had been held in Texas. The event returned to Las Vegas in 2021.

The 2021 World Finals produced one of the most notable rides in PBR history when José Vitor Leme rode Woopaa for a record 98.75 points. The pair broke their own record of 97.75 points that they set on July 31, 2021, in Tulsa, Oklahoma. Leme won both the World Finals event and his second consecutive PBR World Championship.

=== 2022–2026: Move to Texas ===
On August 31, 2021, it was announced that the 2022 World Finals would be held in Fort Worth, Texas, as part of the PBR's 30th anniversary season. The event was held at Dickies Arena, ending the World Finals' long association with Las Vegas. The 2022 World Finals concluded with Daylon Swearingen winning both the World Finals event and the PBR World Championship. Swearingen became the seventh rider to win both titles in the same season.

Rafael José de Brito won the 2023 World Finals event and became the eighth rider to win both the World Finals event and the PBR World Championship in the same season.

May 17, 2023, it was announced that the 2024 World Finals would be split between Fort Worth and Arlington, with the first four rounds being held at Cowtown Coliseum and the latter four being held at AT&T Stadium. In 2025, the World Finals retained the split between Fort Worth and Arlington but introduced a three-stage format. The first four elimination rounds and four Ride for Redemption rounds were held at Cowtown Coliseum, while the final four Championship rounds were held at AT&T Stadium.

During the 2025 World Finals, José Vitor Leme won his third World Finals event title, joining Robson Palermo as the only other rider to win the event three times. Leme also won his third PBR World Championship, joining Adriano Morães and Silvano Alves as the only three-time PBR World Champions.

On July 18, 2025, it was announced that the 2026 World Finals would return to Dickies Arena, with the event split between the arena and Cowtown Coliseum. The first four rounds were held at Cowtown Coliseum, while the final four Championship rounds were held at Dickies Arena.

On May 17, 2026, John Crimber became the second-youngest rider to win the PBR World Championship at 20 years old.

=== 2027–present: Glendale era ===
May 13, 2026, it was announced that the 2027 World Finals was scheduled to move to Desert Diamond Arena in Glendale, Arizona. Just like previous years, the event would be split between Desert Diamond Arena and Cowtown Coliseum.

== Format ==
=== Qualification ===
The inaugural PBR World Finals featured 46 riders who qualified through the 1994 Bud Light Cup Series season. The PBR World Champion was determined separately based on points accumulated throughout the regular season.

In 1995, the PBR introduced the Touring Pro Division, its first minor-league tour, while the Bud Light Cup Series remained its premier series. Qualification for the World Finals consisted of the 20 highest money-earners from the Bud Light Cup Series and the 10 highest money-earners from the Touring Pro Division.

In 1996, the qualification system was changed from the previous year's division between the Bud Light Cup Series and Touring Pro Division. The 45 riders who earned the most money at PBR-sanctioned events qualified for the World Finals. The 1995 season was also the only year in which the PBR World Champion was determined entirely by money earned during the season; the points-based championship system used in 1994 returned in 1996.

In 2000, the PBR introduced the World Champion's Exemption, allowing former PBR World Champions to compete in as many or as few Bud Light Cup Series events as they chose while remaining eligible to qualify for the World Finals. Former champions were still required to meet the World Finals qualification standard.

In 2003, the Bud Light Cup Series was renamed the Built Ford Tough Series (BFTS), which became the PBR's premier series. The 45 riders who earned the most money at PBR-sanctioned events qualified for the World Finals, with riders outside the top 45 eligible to be replaced by riders from the Challenger Tour.

Beginning in 2006, the top-ranked rider from each of PBR's international tours in Australia, Brazil, Canada, and Mexico received an invitation to compete in the opening rounds of the World Finals. International qualifiers who earned enough money during the opening rounds to enter the top 45 of the PBR Qualifier Standings could continue competing in the remaining rounds.

In 2009, the qualifying field was reduced from 45 to 40 riders. In 2010, it expanded to 53 riders, consisting of the 40 primary qualifiers and additional riders from the international tours and the three regional divisions of the Touring Pro Division. In 2011, the field was reduced to 43 riders, with three international qualifiers joining the 40 primary qualifiers; Brazil no longer received a separate automatic qualification spot. In 2012, the field was reduced to 35 riders, while Brazil's international qualification spot was restored.

In 2013, the World Finals continued to feature 35 primary qualifiers based on the world standings. In 2014, automatic qualification spots for the international circuits were restored, with riders from Australia, Brazil, Canada, and Mexico receiving invitations to the World Finals.

In 2015, the PBR introduced a worldwide points system, replacing the previous earnings-based qualification system. The World Finals field consisted of the top 35 riders in the world standings and five additional qualifiers from the Velocity Tour Finals. The additional positions were awarded through a combination of the Velocity Tour Finals, the Velocity Tour standings, and an international qualification spot. In 2016 and 2017, the 35-plus-five structure continued, although the allocation of the five additional positions was modified.

In 2018 and 2019, the World Finals continued to feature 35 riders from the world standings and five additional qualifiers through the Velocity Tour. In 2020, the field was reduced to 39 riders, consisting of the 35 world-standings qualifiers and four Velocity Tour qualifiers. The five additional positions returned in 2021, restoring the field to 40 riders.

In 2023, the PBR changed its qualification system to use the Unleash the Beast Series (UTB) standings as the primary basis for World Finals qualification. The field consisted of the top 35 riders in the UTB standings and five additional qualifiers from the Velocity Tour.

In 2024, the World Finals qualifying field was expanded to 45 riders, with the top 40 riders in the UTB standings qualifying directly and five additional riders qualifying through the Pendleton Whisky Velocity Tour Finals. The 45-rider system continued in 2025 and 2026.

=== Competition ===
In 1994, the PBR World Finals ran off a three-round, two-day event format. 46 riders competed in round one and two with the top 15 advancing to the championship round.

== Results ==
Year	Dates	Rds.	Venue	City	Event winner
1994	October 28–29	3	MGM Grand Garden Arena	Las Vegas, Nevada	(United States) Ted Nuce
1995	November 1–5	6	MGM Grand Garden Arena	Las Vegas, Nevada	(Australia) Troy Dunn
1996	October 30–November 2	5	MGM Grand Garden Arena	Las Vegas, Nevada	(United States) Ronnie Kitchens
1997	October 29–November 1	5	MGM Grand Garden Arena	Las Vegas, Nevada	(Australia) Troy Dunn (2)
1998	October 28–31	5	MGM Grand Garden Arena	Las Vegas, Nevada	(United States) Reed Corder
1999	November 4–7	5	Thomas & Mack Center	Las Vegas, Nevada	(United States) Ty Murray
2000	October 25–29	5	Thomas & Mack Center	Las Vegas, Nevada	(United States) Tater Porter
2001	November 1–4	5	Thomas & Mack Center	Las Vegas, Nevada	(United States) Luke Snyder
2002	November 7–10	5	Thomas & Mack Center	Las Vegas, Nevada	(United States) J.W. Hart
2003	November 6–9	5	Thomas & Mack Center	Las Vegas, Nevada	(United States) Jody Newberry
2004	October 22–24; October 28–31	8	Mandalay Bay Events Center (1–3); Thomas & Mack Center (4–8)	Las Vegas, Nevada	(United States) Mike Lee
2005	October 28–30; November 3–6	8	Mandalay Bay Events Center (1–3); Thomas & Mack Center (4–8)	Las Vegas, Nevada	(Brazil) Guilherme Marchi
2006	October 27–29; November 2–5	8	Mandalay Bay Events Center (1–3); Thomas & Mack Center (4–8)	Las Vegas, Nevada	(United States) L.J. Jenkins
2007	October 26–28; November 1–4	8	Mandalay Bay Events Center (1–3); Thomas & Mack Center (4–8)	Las Vegas, Nevada	(United States) Wiley Petersen
2008	October 31–November 8	8	Thomas & Mack Center	Las Vegas, Nevada	(Brazil) Robson Palermo
2009	October 30–November 1	8	Thomas & Mack Center	Las Vegas, Nevada	(United States) J.B. Mauney
2010	October 20–24	6	Thomas & Mack Center	Las Vegas, Nevada	(Brazil) Renato Nunes
2011	October 26–30	6	Thomas & Mack Center	Las Vegas, Nevada	(Brazil) Robson Palermo (2)
2012	October 24–28	6	Thomas & Mack Center	Las Vegas, Nevada	(Brazil) Robson Palermo (3)
2013	October 23–27	6	Thomas & Mack Center	Las Vegas, Nevada	(United States) J.B. Mauney (2)
2014	October 22–26	6	Thomas & Mack Center	Las Vegas, Nevada	(Brazil) Silvano Alves
2015	October 21–25	6	Thomas & Mack Center	Las Vegas, Nevada	(United States) Cooper Davis
2016	November 2–6	6	T-Mobile Arena	Las Vegas, Nevada	(United States) Ryan Dirteater
2017	November 1–5	6	T-Mobile Arena	Las Vegas, Nevada	(Brazil) José Vitor Leme
2018	November 7–11	6	T-Mobile Arena	Las Vegas, Nevada	(Brazil) Marco Eguchi
2019	November 6–11	6	T-Mobile Arena	Las Vegas, Nevada	(United States) Jess Lockwood
2020	November 12–15	6	AT&T Stadium	Arlington, Texas	(United States) Boudreaux Campbell
2021	November 3–7	6	T-Mobile Arena	Las Vegas, Nevada	(Brazil) José Vitor Leme (2)
2022	May 13–15; May 19–22	8	Ariat Arena	Fort Worth, Texas	(United States) Daylon Swearingen
2023	May 12–14; May 18–21	8	Ariat Arena	Fort Worth, Texas	(Brazil) Rafael José de Brito
2024	May 10–13; May 15–16; May 18–19	10	Cowtown Coliseum (1–6); AT&T Stadium (7–10)	Fort Worth, Texas (1–6); Arlington, Texas (7–10)	(United States) Sage Kimzey
2025	May 8–11; May 14–15; May 17–18	12	Cowtown Coliseum (1–8); AT&T Stadium (9–12)	Fort Worth, Texas (1–8); Arlington, Texas (9–12)	(Brazil) José Vitor Leme (3)
2026	May 7–10; May 14–17	9	Cowtown Coliseum (1–4); Dickies Arena (5–9)	Fort Worth, Texas	(United States) Hudson Bolton
2027	May 6–9; May 20–23	TBD	Cowtown Coliseum; Desert Diamond Arena	Fort Worth, Texas; Glendale, Arizona	

== Awards ==
=== Lane Frost/Brent Thurman Award ===
Year	Rider	Bull	Points
1996	(Brazil) Adriano Morães	Shotgun Red	93.5
1997	(Australia) Troy Dunn	Red Wolf	95.0
1998	(United States) Cody Custer	Red Wolf	95.5
1999	(United States) Chris Shivers	Trick or Treat	96.0
1999	(United States) Terry Don West	Promiseland	96.0
2000	(Brazil) Ednei Caminhas	Dillinger	94.5
2001	(United States) Chris Shivers (2)	Dillinger	96.5
2002	(United States) Cory McFadden	Little Yellow Jacket	95.0
2003	(United States) Jody Newberry	Little Yellow Jacket	94.5
2004	(United States) Michael Gaffney	Little Yellow Jacket	93.75
2004	(United States) Mike Lee	Mossy Oak Mudslinger	93.75
2005	(United States) Cody Whitney	Little Yellow Jacket	94.75
2006	(United States) Dustin Hall	Here's Your Sign	93.0
2006	(Brazil) Adriano Morães	Here's Your Sign	93.0
2007	(United States) J.B. Mauney	Copperhead Slinger	92.75
2008	(United States) J.B. Mauney (2)	Crosswired	93.75
2009	(United States) J.B. Mauney (3)	Black Pearl	93.75
2010	(Brazil) Valdiron de Oliveira	Spit Fire	91.5
2011	(Brazil) Robson Palermo	King of Hearts	93.25
2012	(United States) Austin Meier	Shepherd Hills Trapper	90.75
2012	(United States) Chris Shivers (3)	Shepherd Hills Sod Buster	90.75
2013	(United States) J.B. Mauney (4)	Smackdown	93.75
2014	(United States) J.B. Mauney (5)	Percolator	94.0
2015	(United States) J.B. Mauney (6)	Bruiser	92.75
2016	(United States) Cooper Davis	Catfish John	91.0
2017	(Brazil) José Vitor Leme	Magic Train	94.5
2018	(Brazil) Marco Eguchi	Spotted Demon	94.0
2019	(Brazil) Rubens Barbosa	Chiseled	95.75
2020	(Brazil) José Vitor Leme (2)	Woopaa	95.75
2021	(Brazil) José Vitor Leme (3)	Woopaa	98.75
2022	(Brazil) Mauricio Moreira	Jive Turkey	94.25
2023	(United States) Andrew Alvidrez	Red Mosquito	91.5
2024	(United States) John Crimber	Big Bank	95.0
2025	(Australia) Brady Fielder	Magic Hunter	91.0
2025	(Brazil) José Vitor Leme (4)	Walk Hard	91.0
2026	(Brazil) Eduardo Aparecido	Ransom	96.1

=== Bull of the World Finals ===
Year	Bull	Ride 1	Ride 2	Ride 3	Total
1996	Strawberry Wine	—	—	—	—
1997	Nitro	46.75	—	—	46.75
1998	Cash	—	—	—	—
1999	Dillinger	—	—	—	—
1999	Promiseland	—	—	—	—
2000	Promiseland (2)	47.50	47.00	—	94.50
2001	Little Yellow Jacket	46.75	48.50	—	95.25
2002	Ugly	46.00	47.50	—	93.50
2003	Neon Nights	47.50	—	—	47.50
2004	Crossfire Hurricane	47.00	46.75	—	93.75
2005	Pandora's Box	46.50	46.25	—	92.75
2006 (Note: Following an audit of the 2006 World Finals results, Lucky Strike and Scene of the Crash were named co-winners of the Bull of the World Finals award. The audit identified a 0.1-point discrepancy in the original scoring.)	Lucky Strike	47.50	45.50	45.75	138.75
2006	Scene of the Crash	46.25	45.75	47.00	139.00
2007	Chicken on a Chain	46.50	47.00	46.25	139.75
2007	Troubadour	46.50	47.00	46.25	139.75
2008	Bones	47.00	46.50	47.25	140.75
2009	Code Blue	46.75	46.50	47.50	140.75
2010	Bones (2)	45.25	47.25	—	92.50
2011	Bushwacker	48.50	47.50	—	96.00
2012	Asteroid	46.75	46.50	—	93.25
2013	Bushwacker (2)	46.50	47.00	—	93.50
2014	No award				
2015	No award				
2016	No award				
2017	Sweet Pro's Bruiser	47.00	46.00	—	93.00
2018	Hocus Pocus	45.50	47.00	—	92.50
2018	Legit	46.00	46.50	—	92.50
2019	Smooth Operator	46.25	47.00	—	93.25
2020	I'm Busted	46.25	46.00	—	92.25
2020	Smooth Operator (2)	46.00	46.25	—	92.25
2021	Woopaa	45.00	48.75	—	93.75
2022	Night Hawk	47.25	47.25	—	94.50
2023	Ridin' Solo	46.00	46.50	45.00	137.50
2024	Red Demon	45.50	45.00	48.50	139.00
2025	Man Hater	45.00	46.00	46.50	137.50
2026	Ransom	47.15	47.35	46.75	141.25
