= Spotted Demon (bull) =

American bucking bull (2008-2026)

- Breed: American Bucking Bull
- Sex: Bull
- Born: April 7, 2008
- Died: October 14, 2026 (aged 18); Springer, Oklahoma, U.S.
- Nationality: United States
- Years active: 2012– 2020
- Owners: Julio Moreno, Dallas Schott
- Parents: Playboy Skoal (sire); Oakes 10 (dam)
- Weight: 1800 lb (820 kg)
- Appearance: Black with White Markings
- Awards: 2018 PRCA Bucking Bull of the Year; 2018 NFR Bull of the Finals; 2017 PRCA Reserve Bucking Bull of the Year

Spotted Demon #35 (April 7, 2008 - October 14, 2026) was an American bucking bull. In his career, he competed in the Professional Rodeo Cowboys Association (PRCA) and Professional Bull Riders (PBR) circuits. He was the 2018 PRCA Bull of the Year, as well as the 2018 Bull of the National Finals Rodeo (NFR).

In 2023, Spotted Demon was ranked No. 24 on the list of the top 30 bulls in PBR history.

== Background ==
Spotted Demon was born on April 7, 2008. He was a black colored bull with distinctive white markings on his forehead and body. His brand number was 35. His breed was American Bucking Bull, and his ABBI No. was 10077592. His weight had fluctuated between 1,650 pounds (750 kg) to 1,800 pounds (820 kg).

Spotted Demon's sire, Playboy Skoal, was the 1990 PRCA Bucking Bull of the National Finals Rodeo (NFR) and the 1991 PRCA Reserve Bucking Bull of the Year. He was also the sire to PBR World Finals bull Rango. Spotted Demon's dam, Oakes 10, was a daughter of ABBI Futurity Champion, ABBI Classic Champion, and PBR World Finals bull, Stray Kitty.

Julio Moreno of Oakdale, California, and Dallas Schott of McLaughlin, South Dakota, co-owned Spotted Demon, a contender for a PBR World Champion Bull title several years. Moreno and his wife Kindra moved their entire enterprise from Oakdale to Merced, California. Julio Moreno is most well-known for his bucking bull, Bushwacker. The three-time PBR World Champion bull is considered by many to be the greatest bucking bull ever.

Moreno has a very particular feeding program for the bulls. He also keeps them exercised by giving them an acre of dirt to play in. After the dirt, they run the bulls. In 2018, they intended for 2019 to be Spotted Demon's last year bucking. However, he did so well that Moreno bucked him in 2020.

Spotted Demon is a member of the ProBullStats Hall of Fame.

== Career ==
Spotted Demon bucked in both the PRCA and PBR circuits from 2012 through 2020.

=== Season 2013 ===
Spotted Demon bucked off all of his riders this season. First, at the PBR Touring Pro Division (TPD) event in Livingston, Montana, he bucked off Lachlan Richardson in 5.27 seconds for a bull score of 44 points. Then, at the PBR Built Ford Tough Series (BFTS) event in Grand Rapids, Michigan, he bucked off Stetson Lawrence in 3.52 seconds for a bull score of 44.5 points.

This season, Spotted Demon qualified for the PBR's Built Ford Tough World Finals in Las Vegas, Nevada. His first out was bucking off Jory Markss in 7.29 seconds for a bull score of 45 points. Then, he bucked off Ben Jones in 5.55 seconds for a bull score of 43.25 points.

=== Season 2014 ===
At the BFTS event in Chicago, Illinois, he bucked off Josh Faicloth in 5.55 seconds for a bull score of 40.75 points. The next day in Chicago, he was ridden by Claudio Crisostomo for a low score of 58.25 points. Despite the successful ride, Crisostomo struggled to stay mounted for the eight seconds and Spotted Demon bucked poorly. At the Touring Pro Division event in Bismarck, North Dakota, Spotted Demon bucked off Jay Miller in 4.40 seconds for a bull score of 44.50 points. The next day in Bismarck, he bucked off Gage Gay in 4.82 seconds for a bull score of 46.00 points. This out made him the top bull of the event. At the BFTS event in Nashville, Tennessee, he bucked off Nathan Schaper in 2.3 seconds for a bull score of 43.25 points. At the BFTS event in Springfield, Missouri, he bucked off Ryan Dirteater in 5.42 dseconds for a bull score of 42.5 points.

This season, Spotted Demon again qualified for the PBR World Finals. His first out was bucking off Ryan Dirteater in 6.31 seconds for a bull score of 45.75 points. Next, he bucked off 2008 PBR World Champion Guilherme Marchi in 4.23 seconds for a bull score of 45 points.

=== Season 2015 ===
This season, Spotted Demon bucked off all of his BFTS riders. At the BFTS event in Chicago, he bucked off Ryan Dirteater for 2.60 points for a score of 44.75 points. At the BFTS event in Kansas City, Missouri, he bucked off Bonner Bolton in 3.93 seconds for a score of 45 points. At the American Rodeo in Arlington, Texas, he bucked off Guilherme Marchi in 3.29 seconds for 42.5 points. At the BFTS event in Sioux Falls, South Dakota, he bucked off Matt Triplett in 5.55 seconds for 44.25 points. At the BFTS event in Seattle, Washington, he bucked off Robson Aragao in 3.05 seconds for a bull score of 44.5 points. At the BFTS event in Billings, Montana's 15/15 Bucking Battle, he bucked off 2004 PBR World Champion Mike Lee in 4.57 seconds for score of 43.75 points. Then, at the BFTS event in Des Moines, Iowa's 15/15 Bucking Battle, he bucked off 2011 PRCA World Champion bull rider Shane Proctor in 5.05 seconds for a score of 44.75 points.

Spotted Demon again qualified for the PBR World Finals this year. His first out, he bucked off Shane Proctor in 2.38 seconds for a bull score of 43.25 points. Then, he bucked off Stormy Wing in 2.79 seconds for a bull score of 43.5 points.

=== Season 2016 ===
In January, at the start of this season, top PBR bull rider Ryan Dirteater was asked who he considered were the best bulls on tour. He answered Long John, Stone Sober, Air Time, and Spotted Demon.

This season, Spotted Demon again bucked off all of his BFTS riders. In the season opener in Chicago, he bucked off four-time PRCA World Champion bull rider J. W. Harris in 5.47 seconds for a bull score of 43.75 points. At the BFTS event in Oklahoma City, Oklahoma's 15/15 Bucking Battle, he bucked off Emilio Resende in 2.29 seconds for a bull score of 43.25. At the BFTS event in St. Louis, Missouri, he bucked off Kasey Hayes in 6.38 seconds for a bull score of 43.25 points. At the BFTS event in Arlington, Texas, he bucked off Mike Lee in 3.76 seconds for a bull score of 43.75. At the BFTS event in Phoenix, Arizona, he bucked off Cody Nance in 4.34 seconds for a score of 43.75 points. At the BFTS event in Sioux Falls, South Dakota, he bucked off Jorge Valdiviezo in 5.03 seconds for a score of 43.75 points. In Clovis, California, at the PBR Touring Pro Division event held in conjunction with the PRCA-sanctioned Clovis Rodeo, he bucked off Luis Blanco in 4.34 seconds for a score of 44.5 points. At the PBR Velocity Tour event in Salinas, California, held in conjunction with the PRCA-sanctioned California Rodeo Salinas, he bucked off Stormy Wing in 3.4 seconds for a score of 44.5 points. In Santa Barbara, California, at the PBR Touring Pro Division held in conjunction with the PRCA-sanctioned Old Spanish Days Fiesta Stock Horse Show and Rodeo, he bucked off Ernan Rubio in 3.34 seconds for a score of 45 points. At the BFTS event in Eugene, Oregon's 15/15 Bucking Battle, he bucked off Derek Kolbaba in 4.30 seconds for a score of 44.25 points. At the BFTS event in San Jose, California, he bucked off Jess Lockwood in 4.67 seconds for 44.75 points.

Spotted Demon again qualified for the PBR World Finals, where he bucked off Tanner Byrne in 4.63 seconds for a bull score of 43.75.

=== Season 2017 ===
At the BFTS event in Sacramento, California's 15/15 Bucking Battle, Spotted Demon bucked off Jess Lockwood in 4.66 seconds for a bull score of 45.5 points. At the BFTS event in Anaheim, California, he bucked off Guilherme Marchi in 7.44 seconds for a score of 44.25 points. At the BFTS event in Arlington, Texas, he bucked off Wallace de Oliveira in 2.98 seconds for a bull score of 45 points. The next day at the American Rodeo, also in Arlington, Texas, he bucked off Mike Lee in 4 seconds flat for a bull score of 44.75 points. At the BFTS event in Glendale, Arizona, Spotted Demon was ridden by 2016 PBR World Champion Cooper Davis for 90.5 points. The bull scored 44.75 points. Davis broke Spotted Demon's consecutive buckoff streak of 24. He admitted that he never could understand why other riders had trouble with him. After riding him, he realized that the bull was much stronger than he had thought. He was always trying to pull the rider down. Davis had to adjust for that tactic.

At the BFTS event in Tacoma, Washington's 15/15 Bucking Battle, Spotted Demon bucked off two-time PBR World Champion J.B. Mauney in 4.74 seconds for a score of 44.75. The next day in Tacoma, during the regular BFTS event, he bucked off Cody Nance in 6.19 for a score of 44 points. At the BFTS Last Cowboy Standing event held in Conjunction with Las Vegas' PRCA-sanctioned Helldorado Days rodeo, Kaique Pacheco successfully defended his Last Cowboy Standing title. He rode Spotted Demon for a score of 90 points in Round 3. He was the defending champion of the event and the ride helped him clinch the title for a second consecutive year. The bull earned a bull score of 43.75 points. Pacheco won $150,000.

At the Velocity Tour event in Salinas, California, held in conjunction with the California Rodeo Salinas, Spotted Demon bucked off Rubens Barbosa in 7.06 seconds for 46 points. He was then successfully ridden at the rodeo in California Rodeo Salinas by Tyler Taylor, who was scored 89.5 points. At the Velocity Tour event in Santa Barbara, California, held in conjunction with the Old Spanish Days Fiesta Stock Horse Show and Rodeo, he bucked off Chandler Bownds in 0.13 second season for a score of 45.5. At the BFTS event in Nampa, Idaho, he bucked off Stormy Wing in 6.05 second season for a low score of 41 points. At the BFTS event in San Jose, California, he bucked off Kaique Pacheco in 3.53 seconds for another subpar score of 42.75.

Spotted Demon did not make the cut for the PBR World Finals this year. Later, Julio Moreno divulged that the bull had suffered an abscess in his foot. The abscess seriously affected his performance. When he got to the PRCA's National Finals Rodeo (NFR), having treatment, he did better.

==== National Finals Rodeo ====
Spotted Demon performed well here; one out was excellent, one was average. First, he took on Jordan Spears and bucked him off in 2.20 seconds for a score of 45.00 points. Then, he bucked off Trevor Reiste in 1.80 seconds for a score of 43.50.

=== Season 2018 ===
At the PBR Velocity Tour event in Bakersfield, California, Spotted Demon bucked off Cory Clark in 2.15 seconds for a score of 44 points. The PBR's elite Built Ford Tough Series (BFTS) changed title sponsors this year, and was now known as the Unleash the Beast Series (UTB). At the UTB event in Sacramento, California's 15/15 Bucking Battle, Spotted Demon bucked off Claudio Montanha Jr. in 2.29 seconds for 44.75. At the UTB event in Anaheim, California, he bucked off Brennon Eldred in 3.50 seconds for a score of 46.00 points. This out brought him the Bull of the Event title.

Julio Moreno said, "Spotted Demon is a big, athletic bull." He was second place to Bruiser for the PRCA Bull of the Year title the previous year. If he continued bucking the way he started this season off, he could have been a contender for the PBR World Champion Bull title. Moreno also stated that he got the bull to slim down a little. Because of his problem feet, the bull did better at a lower weight. It is not just that he is big that scared the bull riders; he also whipped his head around. Moreno's answer to a comment that his bull had a reputation as a mean bull is, "Yeah, that's pretty much what everyone says," Moreno remarked. "But I think that's because he hurt a few people in his younger years. He really throws his head a lot, which sometimes connects with a cowboy's face. I really don't think he is that mean. He's just big and awesome."

Spotted Demon bucked out of the right-hand delivery. He was very similar in the chute to what Bushwacker would do. He stood very still and waited for the chute gate to open. He always spun to the right. He had a tendency to stick close to the chutes.

At this point in his career, Spotted Demon had a 92 percent buckoff percentage. In 64 outs, he was ridden five times. He had 19 round winning outs. He had 3 rider round wins. The nine-year-old bull was ranked first in the standings with a bull point average score of 45.38.

At the UTB event in Arlington, Texas, Spotted Demon bucked off Dakota Louis in 5.14 second season for 44.25 points. At the UTB event in the Glendale, Arizona's 15/15 Bucking Battle, he bucked off Jose Vitor Leme in 5.99 seconds for 46 points. At the UTB event in Tacoma, Washington, he bucked off Kaique Pacheco in 4.23 seconds for 45.5 points. At the UTB Last Cowboy Standing event in Las Vegas, he bucked off Tanner Byrne in 5.91 seconds for 43.75 points. At the Touring Pro Division event in Salinas, California, held in conjunction with the California Rodeo Salinas, he bucked off Wallace Vieira de Oliveira in 1.72 seconds for a score of 45.50. He had the highest score, so he was named Bull of the Event. The bull's record so far this season was 6-0. His record to date got him into the World Champion Bull race.

In August, Spotted Demon was ranked the No. 2 bull in the PBR World Champion Bull standings. However, the bull wasn't idle in the summer. He spent it in the PRCA in four substantial outs, with three 47s and one 48 point bull score. The bull was 10 years old; those scores were not typical at his age. Owner Julio Moreno said that he became a partner with Dallas Schott on the bull when he was six years old. It happened after Moreno's World Champion Bull contender Roy, who was a half-brother to Bushwacker, had to be put down. Roy had broken both front legs at a BFTS event in 2016. Roy had a championship round average of over 45 points. Even with broken legs, the bull had the character to earn a bull score of 46.5 during that out. So, Schott offered Moreno a buy-in on several bulls, but Moreno was not impressed with Spotted Demon's bucking at first. He related that the bull needed to drop some weight; that he loved to eat. Moreno put the bull on his special program to get the bull in shape. Spotted Demon did not appreciate the new feeding program, and he let Moreno know it. However, the program had significant results. In 2014, Spotted Demon had an average bull score of 40.792. In 2015, his average bull score climbed to 44.219 bull points. His average bull score was now 45.04 bull points. Moreno believed that the 10-year-old bull now bucked like a one-year-old bull. And he attributed it directly to his feeding program. Spotted Demon was now a bull that riders want to ride. He had a proud attitude when Moreno walked him up the alleyway to exercise. But on the other hand, he got along with the other bulls in the pens.

As of August 9, Julio Moreno claimed Spotted Demon as his top bull. He had plans to bring Spotted Demon to the UTB event in Springfield, Missouri, in September to get another out, as the bull needed two more outs to become eligible for the PBR World Champion Bull title. However, Moreno didn't get to Springfield, so he had Spotted Demon take two outs at the UTB event in Nampa, Idaho. First, Spotted Demon bucked off Marco Eguchi in 6.59 seconds for a bull score of 44.75 points. Then, the next day, Cody Teel rode Spotted Demon for 92.25 points in the championship round and won the event. In Nampa, Teel won his second UTB event of the year on Spotted Demon who earned a bull score of 45.50 points.

There was much anticipation for Spotted Demon going into the PBR World Finals. He was in third place in the standings for the World Champion Bull race. Bruiser was in first place, and Smooth Operator was in second place. These bulls had to be perfect or Spotted Demon could take their place.

==== PBR World Finals ====
On November 7 in Round 2 of the PBR World Finals at the T-Mobile Arena in Las Vegas, Nevada, in his first out of two outs, Spotted Demon earned a bull score of 45.75 points. This out kickstarted some conversations of which bulls actually had a chance at the world title. The out was also memorable because Marco Eguchi rode Spotted Demon in that out for a very high 94 points. Right after Eguchi made the buzzer for 8 seconds, his face hit Spotted Demon's horn and knocked him unconscious. The wreck was not enough to denture Eguchi because, he would go on to win the PBR World Finals event average, as well as be awarded the Lane Frost/Brent Thurman Award for having his 94-point ride on Spotted Demon be the highest scored ride of the PBR World Finals that year. However, Spotted Demon's second out was not what he needed to win the world title. Matt Triplett rode him for 87.50 points, but his bull score was an average 43.25 points.

==== PRCA Bucking Bull of the Year ====
Spotted Demon was selected the PRCA Bucking Bull of the Year this season. He was runner-up for the title in 2017. The bull bucked off every cowboy who drew him at a PRCA event this year. Julio Moreno lost his world champion bull contender, Roy, two years ago. He was waiting for one of Bushwacker's calves to mature. A call from his partner Dallas Schott changed things. Spotted Demon had qualified for the NFR three times consecutively. This year, the riders finally voted him Bull of the Year, while Bruiser was voted second. The bull was also running in third place in the PBR World Champion Bull race. Spotted Demon was one of the oldest PRCA Bucking Bull of the Year champions at 10 years old. However, Red Rock was 11 years old when he won in 1987.

==== National Finals Rodeo ====
In an interview during the NFR, Julio Moreno revealed that the owners do not get to feed their bulls while they are performing or being held in the pens in between. Moreno was concerned that Spotted Demon not gain any weight as he had just gotten the bull to slim down. They do, however, get to provide instructions for feeding. The bull performed better when he was slimmer. The bull had ended his 2018 season with some great outs.

On Friday, December 7, Spotted Demon bucked off Garrett Tribble in Round 2. He threw off Tribble in 4.00 seconds for a bull score of 47.00 points. This gave the bull the lead in the Bull of the NFR title race at this point in the finals. His next out was in Round 10 with Boudreaux Campbell, whom he bucked off in 4.00 seconds for a bull score of 45 points, thus winning the NFR title. Spotted Demon ended his season with a career buckoff percentage of 89.47 percent. He had 25 round winning outs with five rider round wins. His average bull score was 45 points. His average buckoff time was 4.5 seconds.

=== Season 2019 ===
In January, Julio Moreno announced that he and his partner Dallas Schott decided to bring Spotted Demon back for another year. Two factors went into this decision: The fact that he won the 2018 PRCA Bucking Bull of the Year title and his third-place finish at the PBR World Finals. Moreno planned to run him in the PBR and PRCA again this year. The bull was 7-3 the previous season with a career-high 44.95 points average.

At the UTB event in Glendale, Arizona's 15/15 Bucking Battle, Spotted Demon bucked off Claudio Montanha Jr. in 3.40 seconds for a score of 45 points. At the UTB Iron Cowboy event in Los Angeles, California, he bucked off Dakota Buttar in 6.72 seconds for a score of 44.25. At the Velocity Tour event in Fresno, California, he bucked off Marco Eguchi in 2.19 seconds for a score of 45 points. At the UTB event in Tacoma, Washington, he bucked off Matt Triplett in 3.56 seconds for a score of 42 points. At the Touring Pro Division event held in conjunction with the Old Spanish Days Fiesta Stock Horse Show and Rodeo in Santa Barbara, California, Dalton Kasel rode Spotted Demon for a score of 93 points. The bull received a score of 45.5 points. At the Touring Pro Division event held in conjunction with the California Rodeo Salinas in Salinas, California, he bucked off Brennon Eldred in 5.90 seconds for a score of 44.5. At the UTB event in Anaheim, California, he bucked off Ezekiel Mitchell in 5.90 seconds for a score of 44.25 points.

==== PBR World Finals ====
Spotted Demon came into the PBR's UTB World Finals facing 2017 PBR World Champion Jess Lockwood (who would also eventually win the 2019 PBR World Championship) in Round 2. His record for the season to date in the UTB series was 43-6. The two were matched up for the third time. Spotted Demon had previously bucked off Lockwood in their first two matches. The bull was 11 years old at the time. Lockwood ended up riding Spotted Demon for 91.50 points, and the bull earned 44.00 points.

Spotted Demon was turning 12 soon. This year he came in third place for the PRCA Bucking Bull of the year. The bull started out the season with some great scores, just like he ended the previous season. However, he ran into some foot problems this season. Spotted Demon had a covered area to stand in, but insisted on standing in the mud. There was much rain part of the year. He got an abscess that caused him to miss some events in the spring. His owner rested him awhile. When the bull returned to the action, he had an excellent summer. One highlight was his out against J.W. Harris at the PRCA Xtreme Bulls event at the Reno Rodeo in Reno, Nevada, where he earned a 47-point score with a 5.12 second buckoff for the rider. In fact, it seemed the bull always earned a high score in Reno.

However, there were still some differences this summer over the last one. He did not go unridden the entire summer this year. He had two qualified rides in the summer. At the PBR Touring Pro Division event in Santa Barbara, California, he was ridden by Dalton Kasel for 93 points with a bull score of 45.50 points. Then, there was the PRCA Xtreme Bulls event in Ellensburg, Washington, where he was ridden by Jordan Spears for 89 points with a 44.00 points bull score. Spotted Demon ended up at the bottom of the event's top ten list. Moreno said he just did not buck at his usual level. Moreno accounted that ride by Spears as the probability he ended up third in the PRCA Bucking Bull of the Year championship race. However, Moreno was overall pleased with what the bull had achieved in his career.

Moreno kept Spotted Demon fit by using his horse or a 4-wheeler. He also kept the bull in a pen next to retired three-time PBR World Champion Bull Bushwacker. Moreno joked that Bushwacker should have given him advice, but he only wanted to fight. Moreno said he would know when Spotted Demon was ready to retire. He had been around bulls long enough to know what they were telling you if you listen. It is things like when they do not want to get on the trailer anymore, for example. He planned to let the bull spend his time with the cows when he retired him. Schott bought a set of cows from retired stock contractor Tom Teague.

==== National Finals Rodeo ====
In December, at the NFR in Las Vegas, Spotted Demon had two outs there. First, he was ridden by Koby Radley for 92 points and a bull score of 45.50 points. Radley won Round 3 on the bull before a crowd of 16,831. He earned $33,560 for his efforts. Then, he was ridden by Clayton Sellars for 91.50 points and a bull score of 45.50 points.

=== Season 2020 ===
At the UTB event in Sacramento, California, Spotted Demon bucked off 2018 PBR World Champion Kaique Pacheco in 3.41 seconds for a bull score of 45.25 points. At the UTB Last Cowboy Standings event in event Los Angeles, California, rookie Cole Melancon rode him for 89.75 points in Round 4. Melancon ended up winning the event. Spotted Demon scored 43.75 points in this out.

In March, the regional COVID-19 epidemic became a global pandemic. As a result, most social events around the world were either canceled or rescheduled to later dates. In the spring, the PBR held some UTB events in Guthrie, Oklahoma, that were closed to the public. In the summer, the organization held a series of events called the Monster Energy Team Challenge, which were also closed to the public. The regular season events were held in Las Vegas, but closed to the public, while the championship event was held in Sioux Falls, South Dakota, with a limited and socially distanced audience. Spotted Demon bucked in three Team Challenge events. In the first event, game 20, he bucked off Daylon Swearingen for 6.74 seconds for 44 points. In game 27, Ky Hamilton rode him for a 90.75 ride score. For his part, Spotted Demon scored 44.25 points. Finally, in game 32, he bucked off Alex Cerqueira in 4.83 seconds for 44 points.

At the UTB event in Salt Lake City, Utah, which had a limited and socially distanced crowd, Spotted Demon bucked off Brennon Eldred in 4.68 seconds for a 45 point score. At the UTB event in Nampa, Idaho's 15/15 Bucking Battle, which also had a limited and socially distanced crowd, he bucked off Lucas Divino in 4.44 seconds for 45.25 points.

On November 11, 12-year-old Spotted Demon was being prepared preparing for his final career outs. His weight had gone down to 1,650 pounds. He qualified to buck at the PBR World Finals, from November 12–15. Moreno recalled that he thought the bull was a fatso the first time he saw him. It took just over a year to get the bull in shape.

==== PBR World Finals ====
Spotted Demon qualified for the PBR World Finals this year. The event itself was moved to AT&T Stadium in Arlington, Texas, from its usual home at T-Mobile Arena in Las Vegas due to Nevada state restrictions on large events because of the COVID-19 pandemic. The event had a limited and socially distanced audience. Spotted Demon made high scores on both of his outs. First, he bucked off Marcus Mast in 3.68 seconds for a 45.75 point score. Second, Cole Melancon rode Spotted Demon for 92.25 points, while the bull received a 45.75 point score.

==== National Finals Rodeo ====
Spotted Demon also qualified for the PRCA's National Finals Rodeo, again. The event was also moved from Las Vegas to Arlington, Texas. The NFR's home was the Thomas & Mack Center and moved to Globe Life Field with a limited and socially distanced crowd. In Round 2, Spotted Demon bucked off Colten Fritzlan for a score of 44.5 points.

Then, in Round 7, which would be Spotted Demon's last career out, he bucked off Tyler Bingham for a final bull score of 45.5 points. However, Bingham's buck-off with Spotted Demon resulted in a particularly ugly wreck. Bingham lost control during the ride, was launched forward, and his head collided with Spotted Demon's skull, knocking Bingham unconscious and sending his helmet flying. After he hit the ground, the bull then stomped on Bingham's chest with his right hind leg. When Spotted Demon left the arena, the PRCA's sports medicine team tended to Bingham and carried him off on a board, and he reportedly regained consciousness as he was being carried out. He was taken to the hospital and put in the intensive care unit. Despite wearing a protective helmet and vest, the wreck resulted in Bingham receiving a concussion, breaking his left clavicle, breaking three ribs on his left side and two ribs on his right side, breaking his sternum and receiving a hematoma under it, and bruising both of his lungs and his heart. He spent several days in the hospital and took several months to fully recover, but eventually returned to bull riding.

== Retirement and death ==
Spotted Demon spent the final years of his life in retirement at the Springer, Oklahoma, ranch of Julio Moreno's stock contracting partner Dallas Schott. He died there on October 14, 2026, at the age of 18, and was buried next to fellow champion bucking bull Bushwacker, who died in 2024.
