= Bones (bull) =

American bucking bull (2003-2024)

- Sex: Bull
- Born: March 31, 2003
- Died: August 15, 2024 (aged 21); Graham, North Carolina, U.S.
- Nationality: United States
- Years active: 2006–2010
- Owner: Teague Bucking Bulls
- Parents: 263 Bone Collector (sire); TBB AS 13 (dam)
- Weight: 1550 lb (700 kg)
- Appearance: Black with a White Face
- Awards: 2008, 2010 PBR Bull of the World Finals; 2008, 2010 PBR World Champion Bull

Bones #05 (March 31, 2003 – August 15, 2024) was an American bucking bull. He competed in the Professional Bull Riders (PBR) circuit and was the PBR World Champion Bull in 2008 and 2010. In 2014, he was inducted into the PBR Brand of Honor.

In 2023, Bones was ranked No. 3 on the list of the top 30 bulls in PBR history.

== Background ==
Bones was born on March 31, 2003. He grew up at Teague Bucking Bulls in Graham, North Carolina. Tom Teague was the 2006 PBR Co-Stock Contractor of the Year. Bones got his name when one of Teague's workers described him as a "bag of bones." Lee Holt said, "He was the poorest little thing." He was too small to take care of himself with the other calves so they moved him to be alone in the barn. Through the years, he grew into a brawny 1,550 pounds (700 kg) pounds. He was a black bull with a white face.

Bones' sire was 263 Bone Collector. Bone Collector's jumping prowess while bucking was well known. Bones' paternal grandsire was 64 Psycho. His mother was a daughter of Whitewater, a well-known breeding bull. Whitewater's sire was No. 34 Oscar's Velvet, the 1983 Professional Rodeo Cowboys Association (PRCA) Bucking Bull of the Year. Oscar's Velvet was the son of Oscar, a ProRodeo Hall of Fame bucking bull. Bones was also a half-brother of the highly ranked bucking bull Troubadour owned by Julio Moreno.

Teague raised Bones and retained full ownership of the bull throughout his bucking career and into retirement. This was not the first time Teague had ownership in a world champion bull, as he also had part ownership in world champion bulls Little Yellow Jacket, Mossy Oak Mudslinger, and Big Bucks, including gaining full ownership of Little Yellow Jacket for most of his retirement. This was, however, the first time Teague retained full ownership in a bull that he raised himself. He intended to keep Teague Bucking Bulls continuing in that direction, but decided in April 2014 to leave the stock contractor business. However, in an interview with the PBR, Teague stated that he would continue his position on the board of directors and aid them in "taking the sport to the next level."

== Career ==
One of the ways that Teague exercised Bones was in a circular sand pit that he had made, where he installed a type of hot walker sometimes used for horses. Once an animal was inside, there were walls that moved around in a circular direction, forcing the bull to walk in between them. Teague compared working in deep sand to walking on the beach – it took more effort than walking on hard ground.

Bones bucked in the PBR, mostly on the Built Ford Tough Series (BFTS), the elite series of the circuit, for four seasons, but only three were complete seasons, as he only bucked at one BFTS event in 2007. Two-time PBR World Champion bull rider Justin McBride stated that Bones was the "real deal". He said Bones was one of only two bulls he got on more than once who bucked him off each time—he never got a qualified ride on Bones. McBride first got on the bull at an event at Columbus, Ohio, in 2008 when Bones was a fairly unknown five-year-old. Bones bucked him off.

=== 2008 title ===
Bones qualified for his first PBR World Finals in 2008. McBride again picked him in Round 2 and Bones bucked him off faster than in their first meeting. According to McBride, Bones had gotten better and "handed him his hat". Bones bucked off all three riders at his first World Finals. Bones made what became his trademark set of bucking moves, going up high and bringing the rider over his shoulder and then down. In 4.7 seconds, McBride bucked off Bones. "It had been a long time since a bull had treated me that way," McBride said. For the other two riders, in Round 4, Zack Brown bucked off Bones in 2.8 seconds, and in the final round 2008 World Champion Guilherme Marchi bucked off in 4 seconds. Bones finished the evening with bull scores of 47 points, 46 points, and 47.25 points. His bull score of 47.25 points was a career best. Bulls are scored from 1 to 50 points, half of the total score. The bull rider gets the other half of the score; together it totals up to 100. These bull scores were high enough to win the 2008 World Champion Bull title.

=== Betting events ===
An event between Bones and J.B. Mauney on February 13, 2009, was billed as the best bull against the best bull rider. Tom Teague claimed that "no cowboy wearing spurs could stay on his star bull for the eight-second count", resulting in extensive comments from fans and stock contractors on the PBR site. The event took place that night as part of the PBR Express Classic event at the Ford Center, now known as Chesapeake Energy Arena, in Oklahoma City, Oklahoma. Teague pitted his unridden bull Bones head to head against the current world standings leader and future PBR world champion with a prize of $20,000. Bones had been 13–0 on the BFTS circuit so far. Bones had bucked off, or "dusted", both McBride and 2002 World Champion Ednei Caminhas twice. He had dusted Marchi three times, and the last time, Marchi lost the opportunity to win $20,000; Teague bet that much against Marchi. Since Mauney was the world standings leader, he felt "slighted" that he was not offered an opportunity at Bones when Marchi got two. When Marchi fell the third time, Mauney asked Teague for a turn. Mauney would earn $20,000 if he became the first to make a successful eight-second qualifying ride on Bones, while Teague bet he would hit the dust in four seconds. Mauney succeeded. He rode Bones for a qualifying time and scored 93.5 points out of a maximum of 100. Although there was a great deal of hype about the event that weekend, Mauney stated that he just did what he did with every bull, "kept my hand shut and held on". Teague said he was happy to see Mauney prove why he is the number one bull rider in the world. That score of 93.5 points became the highest-combined score of Bones' career.

In February 2009, stock contractor Chad Berger made it known in an interview that he reached his fill of hearing from Teague and others how great Bones was. Berger owned a rival bull named Big Tex, who he considered better than Bones. The then-current Stock Contractor of the Year challenged Teague to a contest for $25,000. Teague countered for $50,000 and Berger accepted. The match-up pitted the two bulls in the Championship Round of the Enterprise Rent-a-Car Invitational. World champion cowboy Ty Murray attested that they were both great bulls, and the outcome might depend on which bull rider drew which bull. The round took place in the Scottrade Center in St. Louis, Missouri, on Sunday, March 1, 2009. Versus broadcast it in prime time. It was the first time the PBR sponsored a contest like this. No other bull vs bull challenge earned an owner such a large sum of money before. Zack Brown drew Big Tex, and 2004 World Champion Mike Lee drew Bones. Both men bucked off. It was an extremely close match, with Big Tex narrowly winning with a bull score of 46 to Bones' 45.5, giving Berger some relief. Berger received more relief later that year when a bull he owned an interest in, Code Blue, won that year's World Champion Bull title.

=== 2010 title ===
PBR Livestock Director Cody Lambert believed that Bones was matched up with the best riders, and he proved he was their equal or better. Due to his bull scores, athleticism, and buck off percentages, he distinguished himself from the other bulls. In the 2010 PBR World Finals, Lambert did not hesitate to praise Bones when the bull won the World Champion Bull title again, this time against the favorite, Bushwacker. According to Lambert, it was surprising Bones won, but it was not a complete upset.

At the World Finals, Bones first bucked off Mauney, who had ridden him back in 2009. Mauney only lasted four seconds. Bones was given a 45.25 bull score. Some argued his score was slightly lower due to the judges foreseeing a qualified ride from Mauney. Marchi, who was up next, tied his hand down too far, according to fellow bull rider J.W. Hart. This prevented Marchi from keeping up with Bones' change of direction; Bones bucked him off easily in two seconds, and was scored 47.25 which won him the World Champion Bull title. McBride felt winning two titles under different circumstances was impressive: the first time because he was an unknown, and the second time because other he was an underdog due to other bulls like Bushwacker who were favored to win.

=== Summary ===
Bones bucked on the PBR tour a total of 45 times. He was ridden for a qualified ride only five times, giving him an 88.89% buckoff percentage at all levels. He bucked on the BFTS 34 times. Of those, he was ridden for a qualified ride four times, for an 88.24% buckoff percentage in the BFTS. Bones ranked 14th overall in the BFTS as of April 2017 according to Probullstats. Out of his four years on the BFTS, he qualified for the PBR World Finals three times. His average bull score was 45.56 points for all four years. Most do not take his first year on the BFTS seriously, since he only bucked one time that year, which was 2007. He had three scores over 90 points. On February 18, 2009, in Oklahoma City, Oklahoma, Mauney rode him for 93.50 points. On October 30, 2009, in Las Vegas, Nevada, at the PBR World Finals, Pete Farley rode him for 93.25 points. And, on January 8, 2010, at Madison Square Garden, in New York City, Shane Proctor rode him for 91.25 points. Scores of 90 or higher points are tracked in the PBR's 90 Point Club. Mauney's ride did not count because it was a special match staged to top off the event, and not part of the BFTS circuit. The only other rider who successfully rode Bones was Valdiron de Oliveira when he scored 89.25 points on him at the Iron Cowboy Invitational at Cowboys Stadium in Arlington, Texas, on February 20, 2010.

Bones was active from 2006 until 2010 at all levels. He won the PBR World Champion Bull title in 2008 and 2010. He also won the Bull of the World Finals title both those same years. He, Dillinger, Smooth Operator, and Ridin' Solo have each won two PBR World Champion Bull titles; Bones was the first bull to win multiple World Champion Bull titles in non-consecutive years. Only three other bulls won the title three times: Little Yellow Jacket, Bushwacker, and Bruiser.

== Retirement and legacy ==
Teague retired Bones after the 2010 BFTS season when he was seven years old. He announced it at the beginning of the 2011 BFTS season. Bones was still in the peak of his career at the time. Four years later, in 2014, the PBR announced that they were honoring Bones with the Brand of Honor. Bones was the fourth recipient to receive said award. The PBR created the Brand of Honor in 2011 to honor exemplary bulls in the sport. Lambert was not surprised Bones received the Brand of Honor. He felt that Bones was one of the finest bulls ever to compete in the PBR. Lambert also felt the honor was appropriate because otherwise it is difficult for people to recall great bulls once they are not around. He compared Bones to bulls like Bushwacker, Voodoo Child, and even famous bulls of the past such as Mr. T of Burns Rodeo Company and 105 of Dell Hall.

As far as retiring Bones if he won the 2010 title, Teague said he had made up his mind to do it. McBride and Lambert both believed Teague wanted to see Bones go out while he was still on top. Teague also did not want to chance Bones getting injured after he had already got two titles. Teague said, "What more can you ask for out of a bull? I couldn't be happier with him." Some think Bones could have matched Little Yellow Jacket's three title record. Teague has stated that he is happy with the way things ended.

Two months before the PBR World Finals in 2014, McBride said Bones was one of the most gifted bulls he had been on, and was even harder to ride than World Champion Mossy Oak Mudslinger. At the time, Little Yellow Jacket was the solo holder of three World Champion titles, but McBride believed that Bones was more difficult to ride than Little Yellow Jacket. He compared Bones to other bulls that could yank a rider down to make them lose their seat like Rampage and Hollywood. Hearing of Bones receiving the Brand of Honor was no surprise to McBride, as he considered him one of the greats. That year, Bushwacker would win his third World Champion Bull title, and Lambert compared Bones to Bushwacker at the same stage of their bucking careers, noting that Bushwacker and Bones had a similar physicality and demeanor. "[Bones] excelled in all five categories: buck, kick, direction change, intensity and degree of difficulty." He could get his front feet 3 to 4 feet (0.91 to 1.22 m) in the air and then break over. He had a sense for knowing who was on his back. He performed at his best with the toughest riders. Lambert added that Bones was perhaps the second-best bull the PBR has seen. It is widely established that the PBR regards Bushwacker as the best bull they have ever seen.

== Death ==
Bones spent the last fourteen years of his life in retirement on Tom Teague's farm in Graham, North Carolina. He died there peacefully on August 15, 2024, at the age of 21. He was buried next to fellow PBR world champion bull Little Yellow Jacket, who died in 2011.

== Honors ==
- 2008 PBR World Champion Bull
- 2008 PBR Bull of the World Finals
- 2010 PBR World Champion Bull
- 2010 PBR Bull of the World Finals
- 2014 PBR Brand of Honor
- 2023 ranked No. 3 on the list of the top 30 bulls in PBR history
