= Code Blue (bull) =

American bucking bull (2004-2020)

- Breed: American Bucking Bull
- Sex: Bull
- Born: April 4, 2004; Gladewater, Texas, U.S.
- Died: Early October 2020; Lexington, North Carolina, U.S.
- Nationality: United States
- Years active: 2008–2010
- Owners: WW Bucking Bulls, Berger & Struve
- Parents: 240 Sky King (sire); JG #918 (dam)
- Weight: 1500 lb (680 kg)
- Appearance: Yellowish colored
- Awards: 2009 PBR Bull of the World Finals; 2009 PBR World Champion Bull

Code Blue #644 (April 4, 2004 – October 2020) was an American bucking bull. He competed in the Professional Bull Riders (PBR) circuit and was the 2009 PBR World Champion Bull, as well as the 2009 PBR Bull of the World Finals. He won both titles in his first year on the PBR's elite Built Ford Tough Series (BFTS) tour. He finished the 2009 season unridden with a bull score average over 46 points out of a maximum of 50, considered an exceptional score in bull riding. According to many notable sources and his career statistics, Code Blue had enormous potential, but a serious injury in the 2010 season cut his career short and his owners were forced to retire him.

In 2023, Code Blue was ranked No. 28 on the list of the top 30 bulls in PBR history.

== Background ==
Code Blue was born April 4, 2004, near Gladewater, Texas, and bred by Jones Farms. Alvin Jones, who was with Jones Rodeo Genetics, had a hand in determining the genetics that went into producing this world champion bull. He was a yellowish colored bull. He weighed between 1,500 pounds (680 kg) and was 1,850 pounds (840 kg) when he was competing as a bucking bull. He was co-owned by North Carolina stock contractors WW Bucking Bulls and Mandan, North Dakota, stock contractors Berger & Struve. WW Bucking Bulls is owned by business partners Rick Wagoner and Jimmy Walton. Berger & Struve is the partnership of Chad Berger and Clay Struve. Berger & Struve bought a half interest in the bull at the beginning of the 2009 season.

Code Blue's sire was #240 Sky King. Sky King was a Don Kish-owned bull selected to buck at the National Finals Rodeo (NFR) in 1997. He was also a PBR World Finals bull. Code Blue's paternal grandsire was Kish's Buckin' Best #624 Wolfman. Wolfman was a Don Kish bull who was ridden by Wade Leslie for the only perfect 100 point combined rider and bull score ever awarded on the Professional Rodeo Cowboy Association (PRCA) circuit. Wolfman also garnered several awards on account of his many qualifications to the NFR. Code Blue's maternal granddam was a #G79 Red Rocker daughter referred to as JG #20. Red Rocker was a seven-time NFR qualifier whose pedigree is sparse. His pedigree also contained a line to the champion bull Bodacious. He was also brother to the bull Apollo, who was also related to Bodacious and was the Championship Bull Riding (CBR) 2007 Bull of the Finals.

Code Blue's home base was with Wagoner on his Silver Valley Ranch in Silver Valley, North Carolina, which Wagoner had been running for over 20 years at the time of Code Blue's competition days. Wagoner made adjustments to his life for Code Blue, mostly to travel around the country – bulls used for competition need time out of the trailer to relax and exercise, thus doubling the time necessary to get to their destination. Wagoner's partner, Walton, lives in Lexington, North Carolina. After Code Blue became a notable bull on the PBR circuit, his owners spoiled him. The bull typically consumed about 50 pounds (23 kg) of grain per day when he was competing. Along with his regular grain, they fed him waffles. He was kept in an enclosed area for feeding with an ample running area, as well as an area for resting and lying down that they labeled his "lounge". The bull developed a personality quirk on account of the transport trailer being parked next to his pen. If the trailer left, he wanted to be on it. They made sure to always have another trailer to take its place if he was not scheduled to go to an event. Otherwise, he got upset.

== Career ==
Code Blue's owners first entered him in events sanctioned by the Professional Bucking Bull Association (PBBA). Code Blue finished his tour in the PBBA as the No. 5 ranked bull in the world. Code Blue then competed in the PBR for three years: from 2008 to 2010. For two years, he competed in the elite tour of the PBR, the Built Ford Tough Series (BFTS): 2009 and 2010.

=== Early years ===
In 2006, Rick Wagoner was fighting an "uphill battle" to purchase Code Blue, who he considered to have great potential. The bull had excellent bloodlines, and he was considered very rank (difficult to ride) for a two-year-old. The bull's owner was an Oklahoma doctor who was averse to selling the young bull. However, when the doctor's wife developed health problems, he offered the bull for sale, but insisted that Wagoner purchase additional cattle. Wagoner, an experienced bull owner from North Carolina, was not deterred, even though doing so would strain his finances. Many of their family and friends thought they were crazy at the time, but their opinions soon reversed.

Since the purchase of Code Blue was risky and involved the purchase of additional cattle, making the total purchase price more than Wagoner had in his bank account, Wagoner called in his friend Jimmy Walton to partner with him. Walton was not yet in the bucking bull business but had been considering it, and accompanied Wagoner to Oklahoma City. Upon seeing him, that cinched it; they absolutely wanted the bull. This was true even though Code Blue had been jerking bull riders down on his head, which he continued to do for the next year and a half. No bull rider could last more than two seconds. The bull had yet to have a rider on his back long enough to start spinning. The other cattle were a mixture of about 18-20 bulls, cows, and calves, which totaled roughly enough cattle to fill a semi-trailer. By the time they finalized the purchase of Code Blue, he had been bucked about 30 times.

They ran Code Blue on the PBBA, which was convenient, since it conducted events in North Carolina. Code Blue worked his way up on the smaller circuit until he developed enough of a reputation to join the PBR in 2008. Walton believed that part of the bull's success was because he enjoyed his job. He seemed to deliberately change his bucking style when he went out, and bull riders were having a hard time figuring out his patterns.

Wagoner had a difficult time convincing Cody Lambert, Director of Livestock, to give his bull, Code Blue, a shot in the PBR. Lambert had never heard of Wagoner or the bull, and was unimpressed by the video Wagoner sent him. Wagoner just talked about the bull until he convinced Lambert no one could ride him. "They didn't send me a good video of (Code Blue), but at least Rick was so convinced that they weren't going to ride him that he talked me into using him at Winston-Salem last year."

=== 2009 season ===
Code Blue debuted on the BFTS in January 2009 in Winston-Salem, North Carolina. He spent the first weekend bucking off two cowboys: Cody Campbell in Round 1, and Jared Farley in Round 2. At subsequent rodeos, he bucked off Renato Nunes three times and Ryan Dirteater twice. He also bucked off Ryan McConnel, Sean Willingham, Skeeter Kingsolver, and Edimundo Gomes one time each.

At the end of September, PBR Livestock Director Cody Lambert started talking about the choice of world champion bull contenders. The contenders are selected by a vote of the top bull riders. The five bulls with the most votes become the contenders. Those contenders compete in the PBR BFTS World Finals, and the one with the highest cumulative score is named the World Champion Bull. Lambert included Code Blue in his list of probable candidates, as well as former champions Bones and Chicken on a Chain. He also mentioned Big Tex, Voodoo Child, Spitfire, and Uncle Buck (formerly I'm A Gangster). Lambert was not impressed with Code Blue initially. However, he noticed that "He always shows up and bucks the tops guys off."

On October 22, 2009, the world champion bull contenders were officially announced. The PBR decided to change their usual procedure and selected ten bulls instead of five for the first time. One of the bulls was selected by fan vote, which was also a first. Eight bulls were selected by a vote of the top 40 bull riders, and one bull was selected by Lambert. The PBR announced that the ten finalists were Big Tex, Black Pearl, 2008 winner Bones, 2007 winner Chicken on a Chain, Code Blue, Crosswired, Uncle Buck, Major Payne, Troubadour, and Voodoo Child.

==== PBR World Finals ====
On October 31, on Saturday night at the PBR World Finals eight of the ten world champion bull contenders competed. Two were out during this performance. Code Blue took the lead in the competition by bucking off Edimundo Gomes after 5.20 seconds and scoring 46.76 points. Voodoo Child tied with Big Tex for second when they each scored 46 points. Bones, the previous world champion, was ridden by Pete Farley for 93.25 points and scored 45.75 points to come in fourth and other bulls competed to end the second performance of the night.

Code Blue "stole the show" that evening. He improved his BFTS record to 12–0. For 11 of his 12 outs that season, his score had been 46 points or higher. One of his co-owners, Wagoner, commented that the bull always does something different in each out. "He always puts in 110 percent effort and loves it."

On November 1, Sunday night, which was Championship Night, the championship races finished up. With the title at stake during the PBR World Finals, Code Blue bucked off Meier that night as his third buckoff to win the championship. In total, he bucked off Edimundo Gomes for 46.75 points, Cody Nance for 46.50 points, and Austin Meier for 47.50 points during the two-day championship rounds on Saturday and Sunday. He clinched the title with a three-ride aggregate tally of 140.75 points. He had the highest aggregate score of the world champion bull contenders who had each competed in three rounds. Code Blue beat out second-place finisher Voodoo Child, with an aggregate score of 139.5, by 1.25 points. Big Tex followed at third place with an aggregate score of 138.75. Lambert said that Code Blue had been the best bull throughout the season.

Nance selected Code Blue in the Round 5 draft because he believed he had the "right combination to crack his code", but only lasted 4.3 seconds. Code Blue received a bull score of 45.5. The bull's other two scores were 46.75 and 47.5, for a three-ride aggregate of 140.75. Nance made it clear he felt Code Blue had all the skills it takes to be a world champion bull.

==== Season summary ====
Code Blue stayed unridden throughout his entire first season on the BFTS. He finished his season with a 14–0 record against the bull riders. His career outs at all levels for 2009 is 17–0 with a BFTS score average of 46.23. He has a career average buckoff time of 4.41 seconds. Counting trips out of the bucking chute ("outs") that occurred before he joined the PBR circuit, he bucked off riders 52 straight times by the end of 2009, and his owners believe that was unprecedented.

Wagoner was highly optimistic about his bull. "Riders have said all year they are going to ride him, but nobody has yet. The bull doesn't have a set pattern, and the riders are having trouble figuring him out." J.B. Mauney finished No. 2 in the world the last two years, and he's (Code Blue) thrown J.B. off two times. He's going to come and he's going to buck. He'll never let you down. He'll buck 110 percent and he loves it".

Code Blue's unridden streak also garnered him the respect of PBR World Champion Bull Rider Michael Gaffney. "He's very athletic, and he has all of the attributes of a rank bucking bull," Gaffney said. "He leaves (the chute) really hard and he leaves there with a lot of authority".

Chad Berger, one of the bull's co-owners, was pleasantly surprised Code Blue went the entire 2009 season without being ridden, but commented that the bull hasn't "had a bad day". He noted that riders like Renato Nunes or Chris Shivers, who fit his bucking style, were just unable to ride him because he burst forward to get the rider leaning back and then would snap them off.

PBR co-founder and PRCA World Champion Ty Murray evaluated the bull as the "total package" to compete for the championship, explaining that "he's big. He's strong. He's stout and he's smart. He jumps high, kicks hard, spins fast." Lambert compared Code Blue to Kody Lostroh and J. B. Mauney, then the No. 1 and 2 ranked bull riders, due to his competitiveness. Dave Fournier, another PBR co-founder, became impressed with the bull after seeing him toss Edimundo Gomes on October 31. He agreed with Lambert's assessment and said "he was the real deal."

=== 2010 season ===
Wagoner intended to enter Code Blue in around 15 events for the 2010 season. He had taken into consideration travel time in his planning as time on the road takes a toll on a bull's energy. The bull had also been used for breeding the previous year and had five calves on the ground.

On January 10, 2010, Friday evening, at the New York City Invitational in Madison Square Garden, in Round 1, Code Blue bucked off Austin Meier. On Sunday in the Championship Round, J.B. Mauney finally became the first bull rider to score a qualified ride on Code Blue. Mauney rode Code Blue in the BFTS Championship Round for 76.25 points. The ride was ugly: Mauney's leg apparently got caught in his bull rope, which could have caused a serious accident. Mauney was able to stay on the bull for the requisite time, but earned a "subpar" score.

On January 31, 2010, at the Tampa Invitational, in the championship round, rookie Fabiano Viera was bucked off by Code Blue. The Brazilian unintentionally picked the bull, due to speaking almost no English and not having prepared which bull to pick for the round. In February, Valdiron de Oliveira rode Code Blue for 4.5 seconds at Dallas Cowboys Stadium at the first-ever Iron Cowboy event, to win $260,000. The Iron Cowboy event is one where the bull riding competitors advance if they make it to the 8-second buzzer, while those who do not are out until there is only one rider left. At the end, the winner is determined by who rides for the most seconds. Just before Valdiron rode, Travis Briscoe was in first place with a ride of 3.6 seconds. In March 2010, Code Blue bucked off Vince Northrop in Albuquerque, New Mexico, for 46.75 points. In April 2010, Code Blue bucked off Billy Robinson in New Orleans, Louisiana, earning 45.50 points.

Trouble occurred shortly after when Code Blue apparently injured himself coming off a truck. In June, Chad Berger confirmed that Code Blue had been held out of a Touring Pro competition in Bismarck, North Dakota, due to worries of a pinched nerve in his back, which negatively impacted his balance. Berger added that the bull was going to be examined by a veterinarian and a chiropractor to see if something was out of alignment and pinching a nerve.

On August 21, 2010, Code Blue made his return to the BFTS at the event in Nashville, Tennessee, after his injury two months ago in June, which laid him up. He bucked off Sevi Torturo with a bull score of 45.25 points. Then on August 21, 2010, at the BFTS event in Memphis, Tennessee, Mauney scored a second qualified ride from Code Blue for 85 points. After Mauney dismounted, the bull bucked one extra time. But then, while trying to turn left toward the gate his back legs could not support him. He fell down once before walking the alleyway. His owners managed to load him onto their trailer and left the parking area immediately. Walton phoned in about an hour later to explain that "We know he's hurt. We just don't know how bad". They were trying to decide when to call a vet in.

On August 22, according to Wagoner, Code Blue remained relaxed on the trailer during the 11-hour ride home from Memphis to North Carolina. He said they did not yet have a definitive diagnosis: in the arena it appeared to be a problem with his legs in the arena, but once on the trailer it appeared to be his hip. The vet said the bull's ability to swing his tail indicated that the issue was more likely nerve rather than bone-related.

On Monday, August 23, Code Blue's vet examined him. Dr. Truman Sanner's prognosis was not encouraging regarding future bucking. "Guarded," said Sanner. "It'll be tough for him. I wouldn't want him to return to bucking, but that's not what Rick wants to hear." The vet "observed bilateral high limb weakness" and left open the possibility for nerve damage, alongside other potential diagnoses such as spinal damage affecting nerve impulses. However, he added, "There are a million reasons that could have happened. That's one you'll never know, but you can't rule out he hurt himself bucking." Code Blue's record that year to date was 13 outs and two qualified rides, both by Mauney.

On August 28, Lambert announced his take on Code Blue's status. He mentioned the bull's last out with Mauney, stating it was a "decent out", but then adding it wasn't the Code Blue of 2009 given that he was "obviously hurt". He then went on to say that he had talked with the bull's vet, Sanner. "The vet in North Carolina [who examined Code Blue] has actually called me and told me the problem," said Lambert. "He's a great bull, had a great career, but as far as I'm concerned, it's over". He indicated the bull should be employed only in breeding.

=== Career summary ===
Code Blue was the PBR World Champion Bull in 2009, his first year on that elite tour. He was also the PBR Bull of the World Finals that same year. He was ridden only twice in 27 career outs on the BFTS tour. He was ridden only twice in 33 outs at all levels of competition in the PBR. He has a career average bull score of 45.81 points. The two times he was ridden were by Mauney in 2010. He holds a 93.94% buckoff percentage. His rank in the BFTS all-time ranking is 9th. His rank in the historical ranking is 31st. His rating in the ProBullStats Power Rating is 93.23 percent which puts him in 12th position.

Current PBR bull Sky Harbor is a grandson of Code Blue, being the son of a Code Blue heifer and PBR star bull Pearl Harbor.

== Retirement ==
Code Blue was retired on account of his 2010 injury. He was not able to compete at the 2010 World Finals and defend his title. In March 2018, stock contractor Chad Berger acquired the 3 year-old-bull Sky Harbor from T-Ray Bulls and Paradigm Bull Company. He is the son of PBR Brand of Honor bull Pearl Harbor. He is also the grandson of three-time PBR World Finals qualifier Black Pearl and a grandson of Code Blue. Sky Harbor competed in the ABBI with Chad Berger's goal of him winning the Classic title.

== Death and legacy ==
Code Blue died in early October 2020. He was 16 years old. Some of his sons, including Wileywood Blue and Blue Crush, have gone on to have bucking careers in the PBR.
