= Long John (bull) =

American bucking bull (2011–2017)

- Long John
- Breed: American Bucking Bull
- Sex: Bull
- Born: 2010; Ardmore, Oklahoma, U.S.
- Died: February 21, 2017 (aged 6); Ardmore, Oklahoma, U.S.
- Nationality: United States
- Years active: 2013–2017
- Owners: D&H Cattle Co.
- Parents: 009 Show Time (sire); Page 510/4 (dam)
- Weight: 1800 lb (820 kg)
- Appearance: Brown
- Awards: 2015 PBR World Champion Bull; 2015 PRCA Reserve Champion Bull

Long John #58X (2010 – February 21, 2017) was an American bucking bull. He competed in the Professional Bull Riders (PBR) and Professional Rodeo Cowboys Association (PRCA) circuits. He was the PBR World Champion Bull in 2015. He tied for the title in 2016 with two other bulls (Bruiser and Pearl Harbor), but the tie breaker went to his half-brother, Bruiser. In 2015, he was the PRCA Reserve Champion Bull, coming in second to Kish's #849 Crystal Deal. In 2016, Time Magazine selected Long John for its 100 Most Influential Animals of 2016, at 50th place. Long John became both a fan favorite and a bull rider favorite by the end of his career. The PBR CEO, Sean Gleason, said, shortly after his death: "Long John was a phenomenal athlete with the heart of a champion."

In 2023, Long John was ranked No. 15 on the list of the top 30 bulls in PBR history.

== Background ==
Long John was born in Ardmore, Oklahoma, in 2010, on the Rockin P Ranch owned by D&H Cattle Company. He was named after the "Long John" doughnut. D&H Cattle Company is run by Dillon Page and his son H.D. Page. His sire was 009 Show Time and his dam was Page 510/4. Show Time's grandsire was Wolfdancer. Show Time's granddam was AR 009, a daughter of Bodacious. Show Time was a two-time PBR World Finalist. Page 510/4's grandsire was Mossy Oak Mudslinger. Mossy Oak Mudslinger was also a D&H Cattle Company bull, and he won the 2006 PBR World Champion Bull title. In 2017, the PBR selected Mossy Oak Mudslinger as that year's Brand of Honor bull. Long John is a half-brother to three-time PBR World Champion Bull, 2017 PRCA Bucking Bull of the Year and 2015 ABBI Classic Champion, Bruiser. They share the same sire, but have different dams.

== Career ==
As his bucking career progressed, Long John became sponsored by the SweetPro animal feed company, thus becoming known as SweetPro's Long John. He competed on both the PBR and the PRCA circuits.

Long John spent five years in the PBR with four of those years on the Built Ford Tough Series (BFTS). He holds titles in both the PBR and the PRCA. On the BFTS, Long John had 39 attempts, with 7 of those being qualified rides. At all levels of competition, he had 69 attempts, with 9 of those being qualified rides. He holds an 86.96% buckoff percentage. His BFTS All Time Rank is 46th as of February 22, 2017. He finished with an average bull score of 44.98 points per out.

Long John was a popular bull for the PBR due to his athletic ability. Despite being almost 1,900 pounds, he was very agile and could move and kick like a much smaller bull, making it challenging to score a qualified ride. He was ridden to three 90-point rides: one to J.W. Harris and two to J.B. Mauney. Long John and Mauney had four total meetings in a little rivalry, and the score was tied 2-2.

The year 2015 was Long John's best season, and he won the PBR World Champion Bull title. Fabiano Viera rode him on the last day of the PBR BFTS World Finals. Long John bucked off Viera in 7.41 seconds for a 47.25 point bull score. This allowed Long John to outscore his brother Sweet Pro's Bruiser and Jared Allen's Air Time for the championship. He surpassed Bruiser's score by 2 points. His owner received a check for $50,000 and a new stock trailer. It was also his 10th score that was over 45 points that season on the BFTS. He finished the 2015 BFTS season with an 11–3 record, despite persistent foot injuries.

In 2016, Long John was the high-marked bull twice. He was scored a 46.75 bull score in Albuquerque, New Mexico. He was also scored a 46.50 bull score in Billings, Montana. Mauney scored one of his two 90+ rides on him this year at 90.25 in Oklahoma City, Oklahoma. He totaled seven outs in 2016 and reached 35 outs at all levels that year. His buckoff rate reached 85.71% for his career by the end of 2016, and it was 90.91% for the 2016 season.

In 2017, he only had two outs in the season before becoming ill. In Oklahoma City, he bucked off Mason Lowe for a 45.75 bull score. And then in Kansas City, Missouri, he bucked off Jess Lockwood for a 45.25 point bull score.

== Death ==
On Thursday, February 17, 2017, Long John seemed fine and was "acting like a calf" according to owner H.D. Page. However, the next morning, it became apparent to Page that Long John was ill. So, he took him to a nearby veterinarian in Newcastle, Oklahoma.

Long John's condition worsened despite hospitalization due to complications. He died the morning before a scheduled surgery could take place on Tuesday, February 21, 2017. He was almost 7 years old.

== Honors ==
- 2014 ABBI World Champion Classic Bull
- 2015 PBR World Champion Bull
- 2015 PRCA Reserve Champion Bull
- 2016 Time Magazine's 100 Most Influential Animals - Long John Placed 50th.
- 2016 PBR World Champion Bull contender†
- 2023 ranked No. 15 on the list of the top 30 bulls in PBR history

†Tied for the championship with Bruiser and Pearl Harbor; the tiebreaker went to Bruiser.
