= PBR World Champion Bull =

YETI PBR World Champion Bull
- Sport: Bull riding
- League: Bud Light Cup Series (1995–2002); Built Ford Tough Series (2003–2017); Unleash the Beast Series (2018–present)
- Awarded for: Best overall bull in the PBR
- Venue: Dickies Arena; Fort Worth, Texas, U.S.
- Country: United States
- Presented by: Professional Bull Riders

History
- First award: 1995
- Editions: 32
- First winner: Bodacious
- Most wins: Little Yellow Jacket; Bushwacker; SweetPro's Bruiser
- Most recent: Ransom

The YETI PBR World Champion Bull is an annual award presented by Professional Bull Riders (PBR) to the bull that accumulates the most points during the PBR season. The award is determined by a combination of a bull's performances in PBR-sanctioned events and the scores awarded by judges when riders successfully complete a ride. The winning bull is recognized as the PBR's world champion bull for that season.

The award was first presented in 1995. Since its introduction, the World Champion Bull title has been awarded annually, with the competition and scoring criteria changing over time as the PBR has modified its competition format and scoring system.

Three bulls – Little Yellow Jacket, Bushwacker, and SweetPro's Bruiser – have won the championship three times, the most in PBR history.

YETI became the title sponsor of the award in 2016.

== List of champions ==
Season	Champion	Stock contractor	Ref.
1995	Bodacious	Andrews Rodeo Co.	
1996	Babyface	Terry Williams Bucking Bulls	
1997	Panhandle Slim	Terry Williams Bucking Bulls	
1998	Moody Blues	Terry Williams Bucking Bulls	
1999	Promiseland	Terry Williams Bucking Bulls	
2000	Dillinger	Herrington Cattle Co.	
2001	Dillinger	Herrington Cattle Co.	
2002	Little Yellow Jacket	Joe Berger / Tom Teague / Bernie Taupin	
2003	Little Yellow Jacket (2)	Joe Berger / Tom Teague / Bernie Taupin	
2004	Little Yellow Jacket (3)	Joe Berger / Tom Teague / Bernie Taupin	
2005	Big Bucks	Frontier Rodeo Company	
2006	Mossy Oak Mudslinger	Page & Teague Bucking Bulls	
2007	Chicken on a Chain	Robinson / Tedesco / Larry the Cable Guy	
2008	Bones	Teague Bucking Bulls, LLC	
2009	Code Blue	Walton & Wagoner / Berger & Struve	
2010	Bones (2)	Teague Bucking Bulls, LLC	
2011	Bushwacker	Julio Moreno / Richard Oliveira	
2012	Asteroid	Circle T Ranch & Rodeo	
2013	Bushwacker (2)	Julio Moreno / Richard Oliveira	
2014	Bushwacker (3)	Julio Moreno / Richard Oliveira	
2015	SweetPro's Long John	D&H Cattle Co.	
2016	SweetPro's Bruiser	D&H Cattle Co. / Buck Cattle Co.	
2017	SweetPro's Bruiser (2)	D&H Cattle Co. / Buck Cattle Co.	
2018	SweetPro's Bruiser (3)	D&H Cattle Co. / Buck Cattle Co.	
2019	Smooth Operator	Julie Rosen / Clay Struve / Dakota Rodeo / Chad Berger	
2020	Smooth Operator (2)	Julie Rosen / Clay Struve / Dakota Rodeo / Chad Berger	
2021	Woopaa	Barker Bulls / Hookin' W Ranch	
2022	Ridin' Solo	Bill McCarty / McCoy Rodeo	
2023	Ridin' Solo (2)	Bill McCarty / McCoy Rodeo	
2024	Man Hater	Jane Clark / Gene Owen	
2025	Man Hater (2)	Jane Clark / Gene Owen	
2026	Ransom	D&H Cattle Co. / Flinn	
