= Mudslinger (bull) =

American bucking bull (1997-2012)

Mossy Oak Mudslinger
- Breed: Brangus Cross
- Sex: Bull
- Born: 1997
- Died: 2012 (aged 14–15)
- Nationality: United States
- Years active: 2000 - 2006
- Owners: D&H Cattle Company, Teague Bucking Bulls
- Parents: Page 01 (sire); Page 590-228(dam)
- Weight: 1580 lb (720 kg)
- Appearance: Dark Brown Brindle
- Awards: 2006 PBR World Champion Bull

Mudslinger #790 (1997–2012) was an American bucking bull. He was the 2006 PBR World Champion Bull. He began his bucking career at age three. His owners retired him after the 2006 season ended, while he was still in his peak. He died in 2012 when he was almost 15 years old. His owners buried him on their ranch. In 2017, the PBR honored him with the Brand of Honor.

In 2023, Mudslinger was ranked No. 8 on the list of the top 30 bulls in PBR history.

== Background ==
Mudslinger was born in 1997 and raised on the Rockin P Ranch in Ardmore, Oklahoma, owned by D&H Cattle Company. D&H Cattle Company is owned and operated by Dillon Page and his son, H.D. Page. They are one of the largest stock contractors in the bucking bull business. They run their bulls in both the PBR and Professional Rodeo Cowboys Association (PRCA) circuits. They can claim a few world champions. Mudslinger was a Brangus cross. He was a dark brown brindle. He weighed 1,580 pounds (720 kg). He had large horns that pointed upwards diagonally.

Mudslinger can claim all Page cows for his breeding. His paternal grandsire was Super Dave. His maternal grandsire was Broke Back V. At that time, it was not common to name the maternal side. His sire was Page 01, and his dam was Page 590-228. His maternal granddam and paternal granddam are referred to as "Page Breeding."

== Career ==
Mudslinger bucked almost exclusively in the PBR circuit, with only a couple rides falling outside. He bucked from 2001 until 2006. His name was originally Washita Mudslinger. In the middle of the 2001 season, he became sponsored by the Mossy Oak camouflage company, thus changing his name to Mossy Oak Mudslinger. Every year except 2006 he bucked exclusively on the Built Ford Tough Series (BFTS), the elite series of the PBR. His final year, 2006, he did buck about three times outside the BFTS. Specifically, he bucked two times in the PRCA and once on a lower level tour of the PBR.

Mudslinger bucked a total of 94 times on the PBR tour, including 93 times in the BFTS championship round. He had an average bull score of 45.83 points. Bull riders only completed rides on him 27 times. Of those 27 times, only 15 riders were round-winners. Those 15 riders averaged a score of 91.87 points on Mudslinger. Cory McFadden managed the highest score on Mudslinger when he rode him in 2001 at the PBR World Finals at the Thomas & Mack Center in Las Vegas, Nevada, for a high score of 95.5 points. In 2006, the year he retired, riders who got a qualified ride on him scored an average of 91.6 points. Based on this average, he was still bucking at almost as high a level at the end of his bucking career.

Former PBR and PRCA bull rider, Cody Whitney said, "I got on Mudslinger four times, and I rode him twice. Each time felt different than the time before." He also stated that Mudslinger is, "Hands down one of the rankest bulls I ever got on, you had to have your game on point to ride that bull."

Two-time World Champion Justin McBride attempted Mudslinger around six or seven times. McBride claims that he attempted Mudslinger more times than he has been on any other bull in his career. He won a great deal of money on Mudslinger both riding and bucking off the bull. In 2003, Mudslinger was the last bull McBride got on to win the PBR World Finals and he bucked off him. McBride said, "If you didn't mess him up, you were going to win first."

In 2001, PBR Livestock Director Cody Lambert, recalls that Mudslinger looked fantastic the first time he saw him ridden. It was an event in Columbus, Georgia, on the Bud Light Cup Series (BLC). Mudslinger was three years old at the time. It was his third trip that year. Bull rider Adam Carrillo rode him for a very high score of 94.5 points. The ride made the PBR 90-Point Club.

In 2002, Mudslinger finished as runner-up to Little Yellow Jacket. Dillon Page strongly felt Mudslinger should have won the title that year. He was only ridden once. He bucked off two-time World Champion Chris Shivers "after a 7.6–second ride in Phoenix that everyone said would probably have been the all–time points record". However, the riders voted for Little Yellow Jacket. In 2004, bull rider Mike Lee rode Mudslinger for 93.75 points. That ride tied with another ride for the highest score of the year. Lee won the World Champion bull rider title that year.

Mudslinger's final showings occurred at the 2006 PBR World Finals. It was Greg Potter who scored the last qualified ride of his career on Mudslinger. He drew him for the fourth time in his career in round 2. Potter finally rode him for 89.75 points. Then, Mudslinger bucked off the 2008 World Champion Guilherme Marchi in 5.1 seconds for his last trip. He did this in round 6 and was marked a high score of 46.5 points. Mudslinger launching Marchi off him while bucking helped Adriano Morães win his third World Champion bull rider title. Mudslinger spent six years on tour and had qualified for the finals each of those years. He was runner-up for the world champion bull title, in 2004 and 2005, as well as being the high money bull in 2005. Then, in 2006, he won the World Champion Bull title for himself. Mudslinger "is often credited as a major reason why D&H Cattle Co. was named Stock Contractor of the Year" from 2001 to 2005.

Cody Lambert explained that the bulls who are picked for the championship round at the finals are based on how they performed on the rounds leading up to the championship round. Lambert held Mudslinger, Dr. Proctor, and Pandora's Box out of the 2006 championship round for the same reason, their performance was not up to par in the rounds leading up. He further explained that "I thought it'd be kind of cool for (Mudslinger) to go out with some of his sons who had moved up from the Classic event". Nonetheless, Mudslinger had a great last out. Page said "He still has outstanding days, he just can't put them together all the time". The Pages and partner Tom Teague collected a trailer and $200,000 cash prize for the honor. Dillon related, "I actually wanted to retire him last year, but with Little Yellow Jacket and Blueberry Wine retiring in 2005, I was talked out of it. I'm glad we waited until this year."

== Legacy and retirement ==
After his last ride on Mudslinger, Greg Potter reflected on him. He felt "This is one of the greatest bulls of all time. Everybody likes him and everybody wants to draw him. From the time he first runs into the chutes, he gives you a fair shot every time. You make a mistake, you're on the ground...You can't say that about Dr. Proctor or Pandora's Box".

It was after Mudslinger won the 2006 PBR World Champion Bull title that his owners evaluated his next career move. H.D. Page reflected Mudslinger qualified for the PBR World Finals six times. He was most responsible for turning their business profitable. He was well-known. And he already had calves selling for $30,000.

Dillon Page felt Mudslinger earned his retirement, so the Pages provided him an area for breeding with cows. Dillon referred to him as "a part of our family". Mudslinger lived on the ranch until he was almost 15 years old in 2012. After he died, they buried him on the ranch.

Mudslinger continued to live through his sons, such as Velvet Slinger, Double Oak, Hot Stuff, Copperhead Slinger, and Little Snake. More recently, the Pages were benefiting through his grandsons. The late bull Long John won the title in 2015, and Bruiser won the title in 2016-18. Bruiser tied Little Yellow Jacket and Bushwacker for winning 3 world titles in 2018, also tying Little Yellow Jacket for winning three in a row. Both champions have Mudslinger's daughters for their dams.

H.D. says Mudslinger is "irreplaceable". Lambert pointed out that most of Mudslinger's trips were in the competition rounds, which makes them even more impressive. He was always competing against the best bull riders of the weekend and of the era.

Cody Lambert believes Mudslinger was on a par with other bulls that won one championship or just came close to winning one. Bulls such Red Wolf, Chicken on a Chain, and Blueberry Wine. He helped make other multi-titled bulls great too, like Dillinger and Little Yellow Jacket, by challenging them. He finished second to both bulls in world championship bull races. After four years of being close in the race, he was the champion in his last race. In 2017, the PBR decided to honor this bull with the Heroes and Legends Celebration: Brand of Honor. He is ranked fifth in the Probullstat Hall of Fame listing. And he is listed seventh in the all time historical ranking on Probullstats.com due to his adjusted average score marking of 45.86.

== Honors ==
- 2002 PBR Reserve (second place) Champion Bull
- 2004 PBR Reserve (second place) Champion Bull
- 2005 PBR Reserve (second place) Champion Bull
- 2005 PBR High Money Bull
- 2006 PBR World Champion Bull (vote of 45 highest ranked bull riders)
- 2017 PBR Brand of Honor
- ProBullStats Hall of Fame
- 2023 ranked No. 8 on the list of the top 30 bulls in PBR history
