= Bruiser (bull) =

American bucking bull (2011-2022)

- Breed: American Bucking Bull
- Sex: Bull
- Born: March 2, 2011; Ardmore, Oklahoma, U.S.
- Died: May 17, 2022 (aged 11); Dickson, Oklahoma, U.S.
- Nationality: United States
- Years active: 2014–2020
- Owners: D&H Cattle Co., Buck Cattle Co.
- Parents: 009 Show Time (sire); Page T8 (dam)
- Weight: 1700 lb (770 kg)
- Appearance: Brown
- Awards: 2015 ABBI Classic Champion; 2015 PBR Reserve Champion Bull; 2015 NFR Bull of the Finals; 2016 PBR World Champion Bull; 2016 PRCA Reserve Bucking Bull of the Year; 2017 PBR Bull of the World Finals; 2017 NFR Bull of the Finals; 2017 PBR World Champion Bull; 2017 PRCA Bucking Bull of the Year; 2018 PBR World Champion Bull; 2019 NFR Bull of the Finals

Bruiser #32Y (March 2, 2011 – May 17, 2022) was an American bucking bull. He was the PBR World Champion Bull in 2016, 2017, and 2018. He is one of only two bucking bulls to win the title in three consecutive years. He was also the 2017 Professional Rodeo Cowboy Association (PRCA) Bull of the Year. Bruiser and Bodacious are the only bulls to win both titles and they also did it in the same year: Bruiser did it in 2017 and Bodacious in 1995. Bruiser was the PRCA Reserve Bucking Bull of the Year in 2015. Bruiser tied for the PBR title in 2016 with two other bulls (his half-brother, Long John, and Pearl Harbor), and the tiebreaker went to him. Bruiser won the 2017 PBR title in a close race against Pearl Harbor. Bruiser won the title outright in 2018. Bruiser was also the American Bucking Bull (ABBI) Classic Final winner in 2015. He also won several other notable titles. Bruiser was retired from competition in 2021 at the age of ten. He died at age 11 on May 17, 2022.

In 2023, Bruiser was ranked No. 2 on the list of the top 30 bulls in PBR history.

== Background ==
Bruiser was born on March 2, 2011, in Ardmore, Oklahoma, on the Rockin P Ranch owned by D&H Cattle Company. D&H Cattle Company is run by Dillon Page and his son H.D. Page. Bruiser was co-owned by Buck Cattle Company. Bruiser's breed is American Bucking Bull. His sire is 009 Show Time and his dam is Page T8. Show Time's grandsire is Wolfdancer. Show Time's granddam is AR 009, a daughter of Bodacious. Show Time is a two-time PBR World Finalist. Page T8's grandsire is three-time World Champion bull Little Yellow Jacket. In 2011, the PBR selected Little Yellow Jacket as the inaugural recipient of the Brand of Honor bull. His maternal granddam is a Mossy Oak Mudslinger daughter. Mossy Oak Mudslinger was also a D&H Cattle Company bull, and he won the 2006 PBR World Champion Bull title. In 2017, the PBR selected Mossy Oak Mudslinger as that year's Brand of Honor bull. Bruiser is a half-brother to 2015 PBR World Champion Sweet Pro's Long John. They share the same sire, but have different dams.

While the Mossy Oak Mudslinger bloodline is especially well-known and easy to credit, H.D. Page gives just as much credit to the bulls' sire, Show Time. "It is awesome," Page had said in 2015. "It speaks volumes of the work for Show Time. He has created the Classic Champ and the World Champ."

Bruiser and Long John had "similar bucking styles and 2015 statistics", but Page said "their personalities at home are completely opposite". "Bruiser is your best friend," Page said. "He tries to get along with you and Long John, one day he wants you to scratch him on the top of his head and the next day he will run you over." Page called Bruiser his favorite bull. "Bruiser is what makes it worthwhile," he said. "He is fun every morning. He is a character. If you don't go by and scratch him, he will just be over there screaming at you to come over there and love on him."

== Career ==
Bruiser competed on the PBR and PRCA circuits. As his career progressed, he became sponsored by the SweetPro animal feed company, thus becoming known as SweetPro's Bruiser.

=== 2014 season ===
In Bruiser's debut into professional bucking, he started out in 2014 by bucking on a lower-level tour of the PBR. He then bucked in an event of the PRCA. He followed that up by bucking on the BFTS including the PBR World Finals. He was ridden for a qualified ride three times this season as follows:

On May 10, at the J.W. Hart PBR Challenge, a Touring Pro Division event in Decatur, Texas, 2004 World Champion Mike Lee rode Bruiser for 91 points, taking home first and second place. Bruiser was still a young bull then at just three years old. Bruiser scored 45 bull points on the ride. On Friday night, August 29, at the PBR BFTS WinStar World Casino & Resort Invitational in Thackerville, Oklahoma, João Ricardo Vieira rode Bruiser for 88.75 points to win Round 1. Bruiser received a bull score of 44 points for the ride. Vieira also attempted Bruiser again at the PBR BFTS World Finals at the Thomas & Mack Center in Las Vegas, Nevada, but was bucked off in 3.44 seconds. Bruiser was marked a 44.50 bull score. On Saturday night, October 25, at the PBR BFTS World Finals, J.B. Mauney won Round 4 with a 93.25-point score on Bruiser, despite breaking his jaw in a collision with the bull at the buzzer. It was his best scored ride since he covered Smackdown for 93.75 points at the 2013 PBR BFTS World Finals.

=== 2015 season ===
Some notable outs (trips out of the bucking chute) for Bruiser this season were as follows:

In January, in Oklahoma City, Oklahoma, at a PBR BFTS event, Bruiser bucked off J.W. Harris in 4.29 seconds and was marked 44.75 bull points. In February, in Arlington, Texas, at the PBR Iron Cowboy event, Vieira rode Bruiser to win the second round by making a qualified ride for a season-high 90.50 points. Bruiser was marked 44.25 bull points. In May, in Colorado Springs, Colorado, at a PBR BFTS event, Guilherme Marchi was bucked off by Bruiser in 1.50 seconds. Bruiser was marked 45.25 bull points. On Saturday night, July 25, in Guymon, Oklahoma, at the Kasey Hayes/Stormy Wing Velocity Tour event, Kaique Pacheco rode Bruiser for a qualified ride that was scored an outstanding 94.00 points. Bruiser was marked a very high 46 bull points. The ride did not qualify for the 90-Point Club as it was not on the BFTS, but it is still notable as rides over 90 points are rare. Pacheco was the first right-handed rider to make a ride on Bruiser. Pacheco found that Bruiser required maximal effort to ride to the buzzer. In September, in Springfield, Missouri, Renato Nunes, was bucked off by Bruiser in 7.41 seconds, almost making the buzzer for 8 seconds. Bruiser was marked 46.25 bull points. Also that weekend, Valdiron de Oliveira was bucked off Bruiser for 4.29 seconds. Bruiser was marked 46 bull points.

==== 2015 ABBI Classic Finals ====
Round 1 of the PBR BFTS finals featured the top bulls of the American Bucking Bull (ABBI) in a Classic Finals round. The ABBI Classic Finals is a competition for 3- and 4-year-old bucking bulls. Bruiser had the highest score that night, scoring 89.75 points for the ride, and a bull score of 46 points. Bruiser was 3 years old when he won the Classic Finals for $200,000, and his total ABBI $462,782 career earnings is an ABBI record.

==== 2015 PBR World Finals ====
The 2015 World Champion Bull contender finalists were announced for 2015 as follows: Jared Allen's Air Time, Chad Berger's Smooth Operator, Julio Moreno's Roy, Rob Smets' Jeremiah and three bulls from D&H Cattle: Bruiser, Long John, and Stone Sober. The finalists were selected in a vote of the top 35 bull riders. The winner is the bull that scores the highest total bull points from two outs during the PBR World Finals at the Thomas & Mack Center in Las Vegas, Nevada. This was Bruiser's and Long John's first year as finalists.

Bruiser had a chance to win both titles for the first time in the same year, the PBR World Champion bull and the ABBI Classic Champion. He finished the regular season with an average bull score of 44.76 out of a possible 50 and a buckoff rate of 84.38 percent. He was ridden two times out of a total of eight attempts this year. He was also the top bull of the Springfield, Missouri, event with a high score of 46.25 points.

On October 21, Wednesday night, Round 1 of the PBR Built Ford Tough World Finals, Bruiser bucked for the first of his two outs. He bucked off Eduardo Aparecido in 2.94 seconds for a score of 44.75 points. His owner Page recognized that the bull "bucked hard, but it wasn't his best day" and the out was short of the 46–47 points needed to help him win the World Champion Bull title and surpass the other bulls Page had in contention (Long John and Stone Sober).

On Saturday night, Round 4, J.B. Mauney rode Bruiser for 92.75 points. But after the whistle had blown, Bruiser yanked Mauney down and hit him in the chest. It was enough to prevent Mauney from further competition, keeping him from a chance to win the finals event, but he still won the World Championship.

According to PBR Livestock Director Cody Lambert, Air Time and Smooth Operator were the frontrunners going into the finals. "I think it is those two and everyone else," Lambert said. "If those two slip up, there are about five bulls that can be better." Air Time scored 47 in his first out with Renato Nunes. Page's bull Long John scored 45.25 on Thursday night with a 2.72 second buckoff of Alexandre Cardozo. Page knew Long John would need a very high score on his second out if he hoped to catch up to Air Time. Then Long John was marked 47.25 points after tossing Fabiano Vieria in 7.41 seconds in the BFTS Championship Round. Both scores combined to give Long John a total finals score of 92.5 points. Smooth Operator, who recently had been performing at a sub-par level for him, finished second to last with a 42-point and 42.75 point set of outs at the finals. After the finals, Berger took the bull for a check-up and was surprised to discover the bull "had been trying to compete with a lower back/pelvis injury". In his second out, Air Time labored in the bucking chute with Ryan Dirteater and left the chute poorly and scored only 42.5 points in a 4.28 second buckoff, which left him with a total final score of 89.5 points. Long John won the championship with 92.5 points, and Bruiser came in second with 90 points.

==== 2015 PRCA National Finals Rodeo ====
Page usually ran Bruiser to several PRCA rodeos in the summer to keep him qualified for the National Finals Rodeo (NFR). In 2015, Long John was competing in both circuits too. Both bulls headed to the Thomas & Mack Center in Las Vegas, Nevada, for the Thursday, December 3, beginning of the NFR. Long John had already been voted the runner-up to the 2015 Bucking Bull of the Year, Crystal Deal. This was the first time Bruiser and Long John competed in the same event in the PRCA. At the finals, in Round 2, Bruiser bucked off Kody DeShon in 4.00 seconds and was marked for a bull score of 46 points. In Round 9, Bruiser bucked off Joe Frost in 4.00 seconds and was marked a bull score of 45 bull points.

==== 2015 summary ====
Although he did not become the first ABBI Classic Champion to also win the World Championship, Bruiser did well, finishing the finals with 90 points, including 45.25 points in one of the finals outs. When Page found out Mauney had drawn Bruiser, he was very enthusiastic. Page knew it was too late for Bruiser to win the championship, so he rooted for Mauney. "It was a little too late for Bruiser. It was a great ride. When J.B. draws great bulls, you can look for great things to happen. As a stock contractor, that is who you want on them.”

Mauney and Vieira were the only two riders to conquer Bruiser in nine BFTS outs this season. In Thackerville, Oklahoma, Mauney rode Bruiser for 92.25 points and took over the No. 1 ranking. Vieira conquered Bruiser for 90.5 points and won the Iron Cowboy event. Pacheco conquered Bruiser for 94 points in Guymon on the Velocity Tour.

That season Bruiser's average on the BFTS was 45.22 per out. Page says "He just never failed in however many outs he has had since he was 2 years old". Page added that if all bulls were that consistent, "everyone would be in the bull business".

=== 2016 season ===
Bruiser debuted this season riding in the third BFTS event of the year in Oklahoma City, Oklahoma. Mason Lowe rode him for 91 points and Bruiser was marked a 44.25 bull score. Lowe reflected after riding Brutus for 91 points two months later that his ride on Bruiser was his favorite and it was his first 90-point ride in the PBR. Bruiser followed that up with a streak of seven buckoffs.

==== Young Guns Challenge ====
"Jess Lockwood, still gnawing on his mouthpiece, grabbed his bull rope and briskly walked out of the arena to a dark corner of the Wise County Fairgrounds." Derek Kolbaba soon followed him after bucking off Long John. Bruiser was one of the bulls at the Young Guns Challenge at the J.W. Hart PBR Challenge Velocity Tour event in Decatur, Texas, in early June, where rookies were given a shot at the rankest (difficult) bulls from the BFTS.

Young Jess Lockwood was matched up with Bruiser. Lockwood appeared to be about to win, when Bruiser "switch[ed] into high gear" at 6.57 seconds. Bruiser was scored 46.5 points for his efforts, and was the high marked bull of the event. "He was good. That is Bruiser,” Lockwood said shaking his head toward the ground. “He is going to go one way and switch it up the other. He let me know he was going the other way and I was ready. I was just a tick out of there and just missed the corner by a bit. I tried to cut loose and Cody Lambert said I missed the front by just half an inch. From there, if you are not going front you are going back and that's what happened.”

==== Bruiser matures ====
When 2004 World Champion Mike Lee rode a three-year-old Bruiser in 2014 at a Touring Pro Division event the bull was virtually unknown at the time and very immature. Since then, Lee had been on over 1,000 bulls to date, especially on the rankest bulls in the PBR. Lee said that the five-year-old Bruiser this year was a very different bull who has matured immensely.

In July, in Vernal, Utah, at a PRCA event, Cole Melancon rode Bruiser for a qualified ride for a very high score of 92.50 points. Bruiser was marked 46 bull points.

Bruiser's maturity showed itself on a Saturday in July in Guymon, Oklahoma, at the Kasey Hayes and Stormy Wing Touring Pro Division Invitational. Bruiser bucked off Douglas Duncan in 2.87 seconds for a 47.50 point bull score. The score did not count towards the BFTS series tour. It was Bruiser's first 47+ score at a PBR-sanctioned event. Owner Page and the commentators elaborated on how rank his efforts were and how it represented "another example of how different he is from Air Time and Long John". He might be easier to follow because his timing is perfect, while the other two bulls are more "volatile". But Cody Lambert said "Bruiser is still so strong and fast that riders aren't going to be able to just nod for the gate and hang on for 8 seconds".

At the time of this out, Bruiser's highest bull score on the BFTS is 46.5 set on a buckoff of Eduardo Aprecido with a 2.94 second buckoff earlier in the season. So far this season, Bruiser is 7–1 on the BFTS and his career average is 45.28 points per out. Mason Lowe rode Bruiser for 91 points in Oklahoma City, Oklahoma, in his season debut and, since then, Bruiser had bucked off seven consecutive riders.

"I will get them to Tulsa, Thackerville, and Springfield as long as they are healthy and doing good," Page said. "Both of them bulls (Long John and Bruiser) are so explosive that it is hard to keep them 100 percent when they are giving that kind of effort. You need to give them a week between outs."

On October 8, Saturday night at the DeWALT Flexvolt Invitational in Nampa, Idaho, Bruiser bucked off Mason Lowe in 2.56 seconds in a career high 46.75-point bull score in a rematch. He also became the high marked bull of the event. Bruiser had bucked off 11 straight riders since his first meetup with Lowe in Oklahoma City in his season debut. The five-year-old bull had matured this season and now he weighs 1,750 pounds. Bruiser matured into a tougher bull to ride, which Page and J.W. Hart suggested give the bull a fair chance of winning the championship.

On October 15, Saturday night in San Jose, California, Bruiser bucked off Tanner Byne in 2.93 seconds to earn a bull score of 45.25 points. The score took him to the top of the World Champion bull standings. After this ride, Page took Bruiser home to rest until the PBR World Finals.

===== Pre-finals =====
Page said the bull had never been injured even though he gave it all each time out. Bruiser performed at his highest potential due to this. Bruiser led the bull race with four scores of 46 points or higher. He had scored 45 points or higher in nine of 13 BFTS outs; this made him a serious contender leading up to the finals.

At the beginning of November, right before the PBR World Finals, Bruiser's hocks swelled up, and Page became very concerned. While loading the bull into his pen at the South Point Hotel, Casino and Spa in Las Vegas, Nevada, Page noticed it. At first, Page thought he had to decide between the bull's health or an opportunity for his first World Championship. Page and his associates came up with a way to use "poultice mud on Bruiser's hocks and ankles to try and draw out the inflammation". Since Bruiser's temperament was gentle, they were able to work on him constantly for about four days.

==== 2016 PBR World Finals ====
On October 25, the PBR announced the contenders for the World Champion Bull. The finalists were: Sweet Pro's Bruiser (D&H Cattle Company/Buck Cattle Co.), Pearl Harbor (Dakota Rodeo-Berger/Struve), Air Time (Jared Allen's Pro Bull Team), Sweet Pro's Long John (D&H Cattle Co./Buck Cattle Co.), Seven Dust (J.A.R.S. Bucking Bulls/Gene Owen), Crossfire (Dakota Rodeo-Berger/Struve), Cochise (Gene Owen/Jane Clark), Stone Sober (D&H Cattle Company) and Hey Jack (Gene Owen/Jane Clark). The winner was the bull with the total highest accumulated score during the PBR BFTS Finals.

The PBR BFTS Finals were held at the new T-Mobile Arena in Las Vegas, Nevada, for the first time at the beginning of November. It took Bruiser two outs to win the World Champion Bull title. He was known all season long as the most consistent performer and proved on Championship Sunday. He earned the title in his second out by throwing off Brazilian champion Dener Barbosa at the 7.15-second mark and garnering himself a 46.25 bull score. When added to his first out's bull score, he had a total of 90.75 points.

There was a three-way tie with the total score of 90.75 points with Bruiser, his brother and previous reigning champion Long John, and Pearl Harbor. The tie was broken by PBR ground rules for a World Finals. The rule was the sum of a bull's best eight outs. So Bruiser attending the finals as the No. 1 ranked season bull gave the tie breaker to him. Bruiser is now the 16th different title holder in PBR history. His first out was a third time meeting up with Mason Lowe the Thursday before in Round 1 where he bucked Lowe off in 5.66 seconds but was only scored 44.25 points. Even then, Lowe still believed Bruiser deserved the World Champion Bull title. "He is better if he is not laid off," Page said. "He is a better bull if he is in his everyday work clothes. That is probably the reason I went to the last few events that moved him into the lead and on the average. He had a couple of great outs there toward the end of the season. That ended up being the dealbreaker." Once again, Air Time was not a factor in the race due to misfortune. This time, Air Time hooked himself near the chutes right after getting out of the chute clean in a trip with Mauney. Mauney partially dislocated his shoulder and was awarded a re-ride. Air Time finished second to last.

==== Bruiser's stats ====
In his three-year career to date, Bruiser was 18–5 and has a 45.14 point bull score average. His average ride score was 91.25 points. Page said Bruiser was consistent into the gate to the left. He would not fake a rider out. The riders "know his pattern and what he is going to do. He isn't going to change it up".

==== 2016 PRCA National Finals Rodeo ====
Page spent June trying to get Bruiser to enough PRCA rodeos to qualify for the NFR in December this year. In July, Bruiser bucked off Jeff Bertus in 3.8 seconds for a 46-point score, and he bucked off Garrett Vig for a 45-point score in 2.1 seconds at a rodeo in Belle Fourche, South Dakota. Page believed Bruiser bucking in the rodeos was all that was needed for the riders to decide to vote him in for the PRCA Bull of the Year or not, and that there was not much he could say to sway them.

This was the second year Bruiser and Long John had qualified and competed at the NFR. The bulls and their owners arrived in Thanksgiving to start preparing. Page mentioned that the NFR had a new bull riding director, who was more accepting of bulls of Page's calibre.

Bruiser first bucked in Round 3 and bucked off Jeff Askey in 4.00 seconds for a bull score of 46.50 points. On December 9, in Round 9 of the NFR, Brennon Eldred, won the round by riding Bruiser with a very high score of 94.5 points. "It's something I knew was possible with the bull I had tonight, because he is a champion bucking bull (the top bucking bull of the 2015 WNFR)", Eldred said. "That's the greatest bucking bull in the world. I was happier than a gopher in fresh dirt when I drew him". His ride on Bruiser tied for the 7th highest score at the NFR. It also tied for the highest at the Thomas & Mack Center since J.W. Harris' 94.5 ride back in 2010.

==== 2016 summary ====
Bruiser finished this season with 14 BFTS consecutive buckoffs. The only one to ride him was Mason Lowe in Bruiser's season-debut in Oklahoma City, Oklahoma, for 91 points. Bruiser averaged 45.3 points per out. He was marked 46 or higher points one-third of the time. Heading into the World Champion Bull race of the BFTS World Finals, Bruiser had the highest average. However, he "underperformed" in the second round with a low score for bucking off Lowe, earning only 44.5 points for a 5.66-second out. Bruiser came back from that disappointment by tossing Dener Barbosa in 7.5 seconds for a 46.25 point bull score in the championship round on Sunday. Bruiser's first out with that low score of 44.5 needed a really high score in his second out to have any chance of winning the championship. Bruiser was a point and a half away from the lead. His second out with a 46.25 point bull score put him in a tie with two other bulls. Page says that "Since he has been a 2-year-old he has been that kind of athlete", and that "His personality makes him that much more special". Stock contractor Melissa Pate, friends with the Pages, also added that "A lot of people talk about how he might be a little easier, and maybe for some people he is, but it takes the world's best to get it from him." This year at Finals three bulls actually tied for their scores, Bruiser, Long John, and Pearl Harbor. The tiebreaker went to Bruiser.

=== 2017 Season ===
Bruiser traveled to Oklahoma City, Oklahoma, to make his season debut at the PBR Chesapeake Energy Arena for the Express Employment Professionals Invitational. Bruiser bucked that weekend in the Championship Round with other world champion bull contenders from last year, including 2015 World Champion SweetPro's Long John, Pearl Harbor, Jared Allen's Air Time, Stone Sober, Hey Jack, Seven Dust and Cochise. On Sunday, January 22, Derek Kolbaba picked Bruiser and rode him for a total score of 92 points. Bruiser's bull score was 45.50 points. The ride ended Bruiser's BFTS buckoff streak of 14 consecutive buckoffs, which started with this same event last January. He came in third in the event among bulls with only Pearl Harbor and Long John scoring higher marks. Bruiser was last ridden on the BFTS by Mason Lowe for 91 points in his 2016 debut at this event. Experts, including J.W. Hart, were picking Bruiser as the favorite for the world champion this year due to his consistency and accomplishments in the PBR, ABBI, and PRCA. "He is going for another PBR title," Cody Lambert said. "He can wind up as one of the most decorated bulls in PBR history with all of the money he has won in the ABBI. He was the top bull at the NFR (in 2015) and he crossed over into rodeo and should have been the PRCA champion."

In February at a PRCA event at the San Antonio Stock Show and Rodeo, in San Antonio, California, Roscoe Jarboe rode Bruiser for 91 points. Bruiser was scored a very high bull score of 48 points. After two similar trips, Bruiser has qualified for the NFR the last two seasons. Page is aiming for the NFR again by getting the minimum requirement of 8 outs.

On February 21, Bruiser's half-brother and 2015 World Champion Sweet Pro's Long John died. He was almost seven years old and a strong contender to win the title again. He was also a fan favorite. Long John was certain to be a world champion bull contender again this year.

On Saturday, March 11, in the Verizon Arena, during the PBR Bad Boy Mowdown, in North Little Rock, Arkansas, it took Bruiser 6.49 seconds to jerk back toward the right in order to rip Vieira's rope out of his left riding hand. Bruiser scored 46 bull points for the out. "Outstanding trip for Bruiser", CBS Sports Network commentator J.W. Hart said on the air. "He is back in the World Championship mix". Bruiser was the No. 2 bull in the world. However, this 46 point score has him tied with Pearl Harbor for the most 46 point scores through 10 weeks. In February, in Arlington, Texas, at the AT&T Stadium, during the PBR Iron Cowboy event, he bucked off 2012 PRCA World Bull Riding Champion Cody Teel in 2.69 seconds to go back-to-back in 46 point scores.

On Sunday afternoon, March 19, in Albuquerque, New Mexico, at the WisePies Arena aka The Pit, at the PBR Ty Murray Invitational presented by the Isleta Resort and Casino, Stormy Wing rode Bruiser in the BFTS Round for 95.25 points, which won him the event. The ride tied for the fifth-highest score in PBR history with J.B. Mauney's iconic ride on three-time World Champion Bull Bushwacker in 2013. Bruiser was marked 46.75 bull points. 7x PRCA World Champion Ty Murray said Wing will not ever forget this ride.

Since the start of the PBR season, Bruiser and Pearl Harbor had distinguished themselves from the other bulls, even the other world champion contenders, and had been vying for bull dominance all year long. Since Kolbaba got a qualified ride on Bruiser for 92 points in Oklahoma City in January, Bruiser had bucked off five consecutive riders.

On Saturday night, April 1, in the Denny Sanford PREMIER Center in Sioux Falls, South Dakota, at the PBR First PREMIER Bank PREMIER Bankcard Invitational, Bruiser bucked Derek Kolbaba off in 2.22 seconds to earn a bull score of 46.25 seconds in the 15/15 Bucking Battle. He was named the YETI "Built for the Wild" Bull of the Event for his bull score as he had the highest bull score of the night. He also was the only bull to score over 46 points that night, both Air Time and Pearl Harbor were second and third place behind him with scores in the 45 point range.

On Sunday afternoon, April 9, in Billings, Montana, in the PBR Stanley Performance In Action Invitational, presented by Cooper Tires, at the Rimrock Arena, J.B. Mauney had made his way into the Championship Round. He won the round with an excellent ride on Bruiser for an extremely high 94.25 points. It was his second qualified ride on the Bruiser. Bruiser was marked 46.25 bull points for his participation. Mauney won his first event of the year. Mauney first made a qualified ride on Bruiser in Round 4 of 2015 BFTS World Finals. Bruiser had the second highest score of the event; his closest competitor Pearl Harbor earned a very high bull score of 47.50 points.

Cody Lambert and bull rider Kolbaba said Bruiser was the bull riders should draw as he was likely to become one of the greatest bulls of all time. Lambert said Bruiser was rideable as long as you do everything right. He said Bruiser got ridden more than bulls like Pearl Harbor and TLWs Big Cat, but that did not matter to his bull scores, which is how the champion is determined.

In early May, one of Bruiser's closest competitors, Air Time, took himself out of the running when he injured his back in an out at the Last Cowboy Standing event in Las Vegas, Nevada. His competition status remained unknown until August 12, when a PBR press release announced that Jared Allen and Matt Scharping were retiring the bull to avoid another potential injury. Air Time was in the running for the title many years, but there were many mishaps that prevented him from closing on it. Losing both Long John and now Air Time essentially brought the world champion race to a duel between Bruiser and Pearl Harbor.

On September 2, Bruiser was ranked No. 2 in the World Champion Bull standings. Bruiser trailed the No. 1 bull Pearl Harbor by a tiny bit more than a quarter of a point. (46.28 to 46). The bull had just bucked at a PRCA rodeo in Lawton, Oklahoma, where he had thrown off Trevor Kastner off in 6.41 seconds and been marked 47 bull points. Despite the excellent bull score, Page felt the bull was not bucking with his complete intensity. Having just come off some time with cows, "Page decided to try bucking Bruiser from a right-handed delivery".

Three weeks later, at a PRCA rodeo in Caldwell, Idaho, Cole Melancon rode Bruiser for 90 points, and Bruiser scored 46 bull points. Page felt he was bucking well out of the right considering this was his first time out of that side. Page had planned to leave Bruiser as a left-hand delivery for his match up with Cody Teel in the 15/15 Bucking Battle. Teel met up with Bruiser before in his BFTS debut at Iron Cowboy in February and was bucked off in 2.69 seconds. The PBR event in Thackerville, Oklahoma, was the first event for Bruiser since he was ridden by Mauney for 94.25 points in Billings, Montana. Bruiser's weight had fluctuated in a typical manner for having come from some time on the cows for breeding.

For 2017, the world champion bull title was based on the top eight outs during the BFTS season events plus two outs at the PBR World Finals. The bull with the highest aggregate score of those 10 outs earns the title and a $100,000 bonus. The bull that has the best regular season standing earns $25,000, and second place takes $10,000. As far as Bruiser's eight highest scores needed for the finals, a score of 45.5 points or higher would have allowed him to drop his lowest score (45.25 points). He only made 45.25 in Thackerville, though. However, Page had not been that concerned about the standings. He knew this race came down to the final two outs at the World Finals. Page said the finals would come down to a close race between his bull Bruiser and Pearl Harbor. On Saturday, September 2, in Thackerville, Oklahoma, at the PBR Winstar World Casino and Resort Invitational, in the 15/15 Bucking Battle, Bruiser was matched up with Cody Teel for the second time. Bruiser bucked off the PBR rookie in 1.90 seconds to earn a bull score of 45.25 points.

On Saturday night, September 9, in Springfield, Missouri, at the BFTS 15/15 Bucking Battle presented by Bass Pro Shops in the JQH Arena, Bruiser was matched up with Jess Lockwood. This was their second outing together. It took Bruiser 6.06 seconds to buck Lockwood off, but it was an exceptional out for the bull, as he scored a very high 47.25. This score earned him the YETI "Built for the Wild" Bull of the Event. Bruiser was named the top bull for the sixth time this season. Bruiser bucked so hard he accidentally threw Lockwood such that his head hit the bull's back on the dismount, nearly breaking Lockwood's back and rendering him unconscious.

==== 2017 PRCA Bull of the Year ====
On October 23, the PRCA announced the winners of the 2017 Pendleton Whisky "Let 'er Buck" Stock of the Year awards. The Bull of the Year award went to D&H Cattle's Sweet Pro's Bruiser. Bruiser was the alternate at the 2016 NFR. Bruiser was also the Bull of the NFR this season (and back in 2015). Bruiser never gave up a qualified ride for less than a 90-point score in the PRCA for the entire year, and only two riders made qualified rides on him. In February, in San Antonio, Texas, Roscoe Jarboe scored 91 points on him. Jarboe's score on Bruiser tied for the third highest score in the PRCA that year. In August, in Caldwell, Idaho, Cole Melancon scored 90 points on him. This was D&H Cattle's second Bucking Bull of the Year title winner, who also had Shepherd Hills Tested win in 2013. H.D. Page expected Bruiser to win in 2016; he only won second place. Page did not expect it in 2017 but the bull riders apparently saw Bruiser as the worthy champion and voted him in this year. Bruiser competed in the finals this year at six years old and weighing 1,900 pounds.

==== 2017 PBR World Finals ====
Heading into the PBR World Finals, Bruiser and Pearl Harbor were almost tied for the lead. Pearl Harbor led 46.38 points to Bruiser's 46.34 points. Bruiser came in as the "reigning World Champion Bull that riders have won close to $1.5 million on". Bruiser was the clear choice of whom the bull riders prefer to ride, given Pearl Harbor's explosive bucking style on a 1,900 pound frame. Pearl Harbor won the season championship by a fraction of a point and also won $25,000 for his owner, Chad Berger. The method for determining the World Champion Bull remained the same as the previous year.

Some of the other world champion bull contenders included TLW's Big Cat, Seven Dust, Jack Shot, and Spotted Demon. Although these bulls had lower scores than the two leaders, there was always a chance one of the top two might be eliminated through injury or a call for a re-ride or foul. Lambert said that "The rest of the bulls are great, but Pearl Harbor and Bruiser are the elite class". At the end of the regular season, Bruiser was 10–4 on the BFTS, meaning 10 buckoffs, 4 qualified rides. His season average was 45.95. Pearl Harbor was 11-1 for the regular season with a 46.02 point average.

On November 2, Thursday, in Round 2, Bruiser took the lead in the first of two outs for the World Champion Bull race. Bruiser came out of the chute and immediately threw Resende to the dirt in only 1.91 seconds. It was the second fastest buckoff of the season for Bruiser and his second highest bull score. Bruiser claimed his second highest bull score and second fastest buckoff with that out. "It was just that first jump and I was pretty happy," stock contractor H.D. Page said. "He is always the same. He just walked in there like he was going to go to sleep, but that is just his deal. He is cool as a cucumber." Resende felt that Bruiser bucked even better than usual. He scored a 47-point bull score which moved him into first place over Pearl Harbor, who bucked off Laclan Richardson in 5.97 and scored 45.25 bull points. Bruiser's lead was just .17 points. Their next scheduled out was not until November 5, Sunday.

On Sunday, November 5, in the Championship Round, Bruiser was matched up with Ryan Dirteater. He bucked Dirteater off in 7.19 seconds; Bruiser almost got ridden for eight seconds. Bruiser scored 46 bull points for the buckoff. Thus, Bruiser became the 2017 World Champion Bull at the PBR BFTS World Finals and Pearl Harbor became the Reserve World Champion Bull. Bruiser's outs of 47 points on Emilio Resende and 46 points on Ryan Dirteater combined totaled more than Pearl Harbor's or any other world champion bull contender. He also won the 2017 Bull of the Finals Championship. "This is what I do for a living," stock contractor H.D. Page said. "I've seen a lot of good bulls, but I've never come across one as good as this one. We've had some bulls be crowned World Champion Bull before, but this bull is just so cool and so ready to work and just a great athlete. It's more special." There was a $100,000 award for the title and an additional $25,000 for the Bull of the Finals title. Bruiser became the fourth bull in PBR history to win back-to-back titles. He joined Bodacious in becoming the only other bull to win both the PBR World Champion Bull title and the PRCA Bull of the Year title. "We'll never, ever see another Bruiser," Lambert said. "We're among greatness right now, and we better enjoy it and appreciate it because it won't last long."

Pearl Harbor came in second place after Dener Barbosa rode him during the Championship Round on Sunday for 89.5 points where he was scored 45.75 bull points. Filling out the other three spots in the top five were Bad Beagle, Jack Shot, and Cochise.

Bruiser joined these other bulls to successfully repeat his title: two-time World Champion Dillinger, three-time World Champion Little Yellow Jacket, two-time World Champion Bones, and three-time World Champion Bushwacker, All of these bulls won back-to-back titles except Bones who won two titles a year apart. Bushwacker's owner, Julio Moreno, was noted for saying that Bruiser "is rightfully in the conversation as one of the greatest bucking bulls in PBR history".

On Sunday, Bruiser's out with Ryan Dirteater, Bruiser used 7.19 seconds to buck him off. Bruiser "almost got tripped up leaving the bucking chutes". However, when he recovered, he was right back to his same powerful self that got him to this championship race. He "leapt so high that he was almost leaping completely above the arena signage". "Well he had such a good day the first day," stock contractor H.D. Page said. "I just needed him to have a consistent day today. The first jump out of there (Sunday) I thought he was going to fall. He had a terrible jump. It's been a tough year and tough competition, but Bruiser has been a great bull all year."

==== 2017 PRCA National Finals Rodeo ====
Although the Bucking Bull of the Year is voted on, decided, and announced in October, the bulls still compete in the NFR in December. Bruiser competed in 2 rounds of the 10 this year. In Round 3, he was matched with Boudreaux Campbell whom he bucked off in 7.8 seconds, almost getting ridden. He earned an excellent bull score of 47.50 points. In Round 9 he was matched up with Ty Wallace whom he bucked off in 4.10 seconds and he earned another excellent bull score of 47.00 bull points.

==== Season summary ====
Bruiser concluded his season with a 12–4 record. His season average bull score was 46.02, which was a career high for the bull. Bruiser scored 45 points or higher for all 16 of his outs this season, including that out with Jess Lockwood in Springfield, Missouri, where he earned a record high score of 47.25 bull points. Even though Lockwood was knocked unconscious at that out, Bruiser had an even composure. He was a competitor for eight seconds, then he was friendly in the back pens or in the pasture with his owners. Page and Lambert both said that the combination of great bucking bull but gentle disposition is a rare one. In fact, Lambert said "We'll never, ever see another Bruiser". Hart said "He'll be in the conversation of all-time best bull, but I don't think he's in the conversation for the rankest...The degree of difficulty is just not near that of Bushwacker or Dillinger, but he's got the show".

In March 2017, bull rider Stormy Wing rode Bruiser for 95.25 points, which was his highest marked ride score to date in his career. A perfect ride score is 100 points. Bruiser had gone out over 20 times for each of the last three seasons at all levels competing on both tours by competing all over the country. With his two wins this season on the PRCA and the PBR, he became the fourth back-to-back PBR World Champion Bull. He also became the second bull (after Bodacious) to win both titles: PBR World Champion Bull and PRCA Bucking Bull of the Year titles. Both bulls won their two titles in the same year. Bruiser in 2017, and Bodacious in 1995.

=== 2018 Season ===
One of the next record within Bruiser's reach this season was Little Yellow Jacket's PBR record of three consecutive World Champion Bull titles. He was voted the top bull three consecutive years (2002–2004) as the PBR used to decide its World Champion Bull by a vote of its top bull riders. Bruiser had won his two titles by the sum of bull scores and performance at the PBR World Finals in the last two seasons. If Bruiser won the title this year, he would tie Little Yellow Jacket's record. According to Lambert, he had already entered an elite category having won two titles in the PBR and the PRCA Bucking Bull of the Year. "If Bruiser does it this year, it is better than Little Yellow Jacket because he also has won a PRCA Bull of the Year. He has been the top bull at the NFR and at the PBR Finals, and he has won an ABBI championship," Lambert said. "He is not as rank as Bushwacker, but neither is Little Yellow Jacket or any other bull in the history of bulls." Bushwacker is the only other bull to win three PBR titles in 2011, 2013, and 2014. Bushwacker also won the ABBI championship. Bruiser and Pearl Harbor start this season as the favorites to win the title.

On January 21, in Oklahoma City, Oklahoma, at a PBR Unleash the Beast Series (UTB) event, Express Employment Professionals Invitational at the Chesapeake Energy Arena, in the Championship Round, Ryan Dirteater rode Bruiser in a qualified ride for a career-high 93.25 points. Dirteater considered it a revenge ride for Bruiser's buck off of him in the 2017 PBR World Finals. Bruiser was marked 45.50 bull points in his season debut. Dirteater won the event thanks to his ride on Bruiser.

On Saturday night, February 3, in Anaheim, California, at a PBR (UTB) event, the Anaheim Invitational, Cody Nance rode Bruiser for 88.75 points to obtain a qualified ride in the Championship Round. Bruiser was marked an average score of 44.25 for a bull of his calibre. Nance won the Championship Round and the event after Bruiser was his third qualified ride that weekend.

In February, at a PRCA event, the San Antonio Stock Show & Rodeo, in San Antonio, Texas, Bruiser rebounded after Nance's ride by bucking off two bull riders. In Round 2, he bucked off Chase Dougherty in 7.09 seconds and was marked 46.50 bull points. In Round 3, he bucked off Tate Smith in 3.70 seconds for a bull score of 45.00 points.

On the weekend of February 25, in Arlington, Texas, at a PBR (UTB) event, at the WinStar Casino & Resort Invitational, the Iron Cowboy, Bruiser bucked off Emilio Resende in 5.39 seconds for a bull score of 46.00 points. Pearl Harbor also scored a 46-point bull score for bucking off Teel in 6.16 seconds. The bulls shared the YETI "Built For the Wild" Bull of the Event.

On Saturday night, March 3, in North Little Rock, Arkansas, at a PBR (UTB) event, the Bad Boy Mowdown at Verizon Arena, in the Championship Round, 2017 World Champion Jess Lockwood made yet another attempt to ride Bruiser. This was their third matchup, and the third time Bruiser had bucked off Lockwood. Bruiser threw him off in 4.89 seconds after he turned back to the right, away from Lockwood's hand. Bruiser was marked a high score of 46.50 bull points for the buckoff. Lockwood had his fill of "making mistakes" against Bruiser, and he was annoyed with himself for failing to win this event. "He made me look stupid like he did the last two times," Lockwood said. "He bucks hard and I am not cowboying up and getting him rode. He is just leaving me each time." Bruiser edged out Old Fort Days and Pearl Harbor to be named the YETI Built for the Wild Bull of the Event.

On March 9 weekend, in Duluth, Georgia, at a PBR (UTB) event, the Duluth Invitational at the Infinite Energy Arena, in the Championship Round, Bruiser bucked off Cody Teel in 6.47 seconds. Bruiser was marked 45.75 bull points for the buckoff. Teel thought he had a good hold of the bull, but Bruiser found another gear midway and thrust Teel off. The two met for the third time, and the score is 3–0 in Bruiser's favor. Bruiser won the YETI Built For The Wild Bull of the Event title. Teel's helmet was wrecked in the buckoff.

On Sunday afternoon, March 18, in Albuquerque, New Mexico, at a PBR (UTB) event, at the Dreamstyle Arena aka The Pit, at the Ty Murray Invitational, presented by Isleta Resort & Casino, Bruiser bucked off Brennon Eldred in 4.71 seconds for a very high bull score of 47.25 points and tied his career high score. Bruiser bucked so hard Eldred "felt his knee pop". The bull kicked his back legs up over the chutes while Eldred fell off. Lambert said he would have scored Bruiser 48 points. Bruiser had no competition from Pearl Harbor that weekend as the bull fouled himself.

On Friday night, on March 23, in Glendale, Arizona, at a PBR (UTB) 15/15 Bucking Battle event, at the Ak-Chin Invitational, presented by Cooper Tires, Bruiser and Pearl Harbor both bucked off their riders with exceptional enough bucking displays that the judges marked both of them with very high scores of 47+. Bruiser ejected Ryan Dirteater after 6.67 seconds for a bull score of 47.50 points. It was his second 47-point outing in two weeks, last week having scored on a ride with Brennon Eldred. Bruiser burst out of the bucking chute while gaining strength steadily and Dirteater ran out of his own drive at 6.67 seconds.

Cody Nance survived a huge jump on Pearl Harbor, staying aboard for 5.94 seconds, but was ultimately unable to best the bull's strength. Pearl Harbor was marked 47.25 points for the out, which tied his career-highest score. It was great rebound performance after he hipped himself last weekend. Bruiser made the highest score of the weekend; Pearl Harbor's Chad Berger had hoped for the top-marked bull, but was satisfied to see the bull get a clean out of the chute. "Just the way he blew out of there and kicked and come around to the left," Berger said. "He blew ahead and come back around the right," Berger said. :It would take a hell of a hand to get by him when he bucks like that. I was just real impressed with his power, his change of direction. Everything."

In addition to their close bull scores, both "had drawn a rider with a no-quit attitude that gave each bull a strong test" and helped them get strong scores. "I am always for the bull, but I still like the guys too," Page said. "I think it is the best thing ever when they can be 94-95. I am still looking for the highest score." Berger added, "It really did. (Nance) gritted it out and rode him about as long as anybody does or a little bit longer. He has been the hardest guy to buck off on the tour."

Bruiser was 8–2 to date, and Pearl Harbor was 8–0. Bruiser's season average to date is 45.97 points. Pearl Harbor's average was 45.69 points. There was a little more than a quarter of a point difference between them. The next closest competitor was Spotted Demon, a 10-year-old bull who recently posted his second 46-point score of the season. He was only .72 points behind Bruiser. He needed four more outs to qualify for the championship bull race.

On Saturday, April 21, in Billings, Montana, at a PBR (UTB) event, at the Rimrock Auto Arena, the Stanley Performance In Action Invitational presented by Cooper Tires, at the 15/15 Bucking Battle, Bruiser bucked off Claudio Montanha, Jr., in 4.67 seconds and earned a bull score of 46.25 points. Bruiser went left out of the bucking chute and starting spinning, the force sending Montanha off after a couple spins. For the sixth time this season, Bruiser was named the YETI "Built for the Wild" Bull of the Event.

Bruiser's score narrowed the gap on World No. 1 Pearl Harbor to an incremental .03 points. Pearl Harbor was pulled out of the event due to a neck strain injury. This season, it was Bruiser's second fastest buckoff. It was also his six consecutive buckoff.

On Tuesday, April 24, Pearl Harbor died of a blood clot near his brain at the age of six. At the time, Pearl Harbor was the No. 1 bull in the PBR World Standings. He had a 46.25-point average and was 10–0 on the (UTB). "I was a huge fan of Pearl Harbor," said H.D. Page. "I wanted Bruiser to beat him every week, but there were weeks I knew we got beat. I am a huge fan of bull riding and watching a great bull like that buck, I would go buy a ticket to watch those great bulls buck. He sure will be missed. The rivalry between him and Bruiser has been there and it was just heating up. It was really fun. I was never upset when he won because those are two great bulls. Now it is like a fight that went unfought kind of deal." "He was one of the best two bucking bulls in the world these past couple of years," Lambert said. "He was harder to ride than Bruiser, but he didn't quite have the flash to beat him; and Bruiser is one of the all-time greats, and so is Pearl Harbor. Pearl Harbor is in the conversation with the all-time greats even though he hasn't won a championship."

In May, in Las Vegas, Nevada, at a PBR (UTB) event, the Last Cowboy Standing, presented by Ariat, at Helldorado Days, inside the Thomas and Mack Center, during Round 3 Kaique Pacheco was randomly matched up with Bruiser. Pacheco retained his usual cool when riding the bull for a career-high 92.75 points. Bruiser turned left out of the bucking chute as he typically does. He then turned back into Pacheco's right-hand at the 4-second mark. Pacheco earned a bonus payout of $26,000 due to the ride being the high-marked ride of the weekend. The ride also brought his total earnings at the Last Cowboy Standing this weekend to a career-best $160,291.67. The ride marked Pacheco's third time on Bruiser. Their first ride was in 2015 when they were still very new to the PBR. Pacheco rode the bull in a lower-level tour at Guymon, Oklahoma, for 94 points back then. Pacheco explained how Bruiser was the best bull for him. The judges marked Bruiser 45.5 bull points and ended his streak of three consecutive outs with 46.25 plus scores.

Bruiser's first out in the summer was against Derek Kolbaba, who rode the bull at the Days of 47 rodeo in Salt Lake City, Utah, on July 19. Bruiser was marked 44.50 points in that out. He then bucked the next week on July 26 at the Red Desert Roundup PRCA rodeo in Rock Springs, Wyoming, where Joe Frost rode him in the first round for 90.50 points, while Bruiser was marked 45 points for his half of the ride. This would be Bruiser's final regular season outing of 2018.

His next appearance was at the PBR World Finals in November. He bucked off Francisco García Torres in Round 2 and was marked 44.75 points. He then bucked at the event's Championship Round where José Vitor Leme rode him for 93.75 points. Bruiser was marked 45.75 points and clinched his third PBR World Champion Bull title. His last outings for 2018 were at the PRCA's National Finals Rodeo in December. He bucked off Cole Melancon in Round 2 and was marked 46.50 points. He was then ridden in Round 9 by Eli Vastbinder for 91 points for the round win. Bruiser for his part was marked 46 points for that ride.

=== 2019 Season ===
Bruiser's first out for 2019 was at the PRCA's San Antonio Stock Show and Rodeo in San Antonio, Texas, in February where he bucked off Tristan Mize in a regular round and was marked 45 points. He returned for the Championship Round of the event where four-time PRCA World Champion bull rider J.W. Harris rode him for 92.50 points to win the event. Bruiser was marked 45.50 points in this outing. He next bucked on March 15 at a PBR Touring Pro Division in Belton, Texas, where he bucked off Dusty Craig and was marked 45.50 points.

His next out was at the PBR Unleash the Beast Series event in Sioux Falls, South Dakota, in April where he bucked off Ezekiel Mitchell in Round 1 and was marked 45 points. He returned for the events Championship Round and bucked off Ryan Dirteater and was marked 46.75 points. Bruiser then bucked at the PBR UTB event in Billings, Montana, the next weekend and bucked off three-time PBR World Champion Silvano Alves in Round 1 for 45.50 points. He returned for the Championship Round and bucked off 2016 PBR World Champion Cooper Davis, also for 45.50 points. Two weeks later, Bruiser bucked at the PBR UTB event in Columbus, Ohio, where he bucked off Chase Outlaw at the event's 15/15 Bucking Battle for 45.75 points. Three weeks later at the PBR UTB Albuquerque, New Mexico, event's 15/15 Bucking Battle, he bucked off Claudio Montanha Jr. for 45.25 points.

Bruiser's first out in the summer of that year was at the PBR UTB event in Cheyenne, Wyoming, in July where he bucked off Lucas Divino in the Championship Round for 44 points. He next bucked at the PBR UTB Tulsa, Oklahoma, event's 15/15 Bucking Battle in August where Cody Jesus rode him for 90.25 points. Bruiser was marked 44 points for this out. He then bucked at a few days later at the PRCA's Caldwell Nite Rodeo in Caldwell, Idaho, where he bucked off Adam Lucero for 45.50 points. He returned for a later round at the rodeo where Ruger Piva rode him for 92 points for the event win. Bruiser was marked 45.50 points for this out. His next performance just over a week later was at the PBR UTB event in Nashville, Tennessee, where he bucked off Dalton Kasel for 45.75 points.

His next out was in November at the PBR World Finals where 2012 PRCA World Champion Bull Rider Cody Teel rode him in Round 2 for 91 points. Bruiser was marked 44.25 points and did not return to the PBR World Finals' Championship Round that year. His next outs were in December at the PRCA's National Finals Rodeo. He bucked off Jeff Askey in Round 3 for 46 points and was ridden by six-time PRCA World Champion bull rider Sage Kimzey for 94 points for the Round 8 win. Bruiser was marked 46.50 points for this out and would win the NFR Bull of the Finals award that year.

=== 2020 Season ===
Bruiser's first out of 2020 was in February at the PRCA's San Antonio Stock Show Rodeo where he bucked off reigning PRCA All-Around World Champion Stetson Wright for 47 points. He later rematched up against Ruger Piva in the Championship Round, but the rider would not repeat the success he had with the bull the previous summer and was bucked off. Bruiser was marked 46 points for this out. Bruiser next performed at RFD-TV's The American Rodeo in early March where he bucked off Boudreaux Campbell and was marked 45 points.

By mid-March, the COVID-19 pandemic had halted the world's activities. Various PBR and PRCA events were either cancelled or rescheduled. In the spring, the PBR's Unleash the Beast Series held three events at the Lazy E Arena in Guthrie, Oklahoma, that were closed to the public. Bruiser bucked at the Championship Rounds of all three of these events. At the first event, he bucked off Ezekiel Mitchell for 44 points. At the second event, he bucked off Dalton Kasel for 44.75 points. At the third event, he was ridden by Alex Cerqueira for 91.25 points and Bruiser was marked 44.50 points for this out.

In the early summer, the PBR held the Monster Energy Team Challenge; a temporary series of events where teams of riders rode for large amounts of money. They were held for a number of weeks at Las Vegas, Nevada's South Point Hotel Arena and Equestrian Center. The regular series of events was closed to the public, but the finals event was allowed to have a limited and socially distanced crowd. Bruiser did not buck at the regular events, but he did perform at the finals event in July at the Denny Sanford Premier Center in Sioux Falls, South Dakota, where he bucked off Lucas Divino for 45 points. The Monster Energy Team Challenge Finals was the first PBR event that allowed fans in the arena since the start of the pandemic and the rest of the events for the season were allowed to have a limited number of socially distanced attendees. Bruiser next bucked in August at another PBR UTB event at Guthrie, Oklahoma's Lazy E Arena where he bucked off Paulo Lima in the Championship Round for 43.75 points. The next weekend at a PBR UTB event in Salt Lake City, Utah, he bucked off Derek Kolbaba in the Championship Round for 46.50 points.

Bruiser's next out was in October at a PBR UTB event in Lincoln, Nebraska, where Daylon Swearingen rode him in the Championship Round for 88 points. the bull was marked 45.75 points for this out. The next weekend at the PBR UTB event in Tulsa, Oklahoma, he bucked off Ezekiel Mitchell in the Championship Round and was marked 44.75 points. The next weekend at the last regular season PBR UTB event of 2020 in Nampa, Idaho, Daylon Swearingen rematched with Bruiser for the 15/15 Bucking Battle and was bucked off. The bull was marked 44.75 points. This was Bruiser's last out for 2020. He did not buck at the PBR World Finals or the National Finals Rodeo that year.

=== Retirement ===
After a year of not bucking, in late October 2021, Bruiser's owners, D&H Cattle Company, announced that he had officially retired. His owners also related that Bruiser had hurt a tendon in his leg. HD Page told Tracy Renck of ProRodeo Sports News, "Bruiser is retired. I was hoping he would come back, but it's not going to happen. He hurt a tendon in his leg. He's going to be able to breed cows, and he's going to have a good retirement, but his competitive career is going to be over with." The Pages planned to give him plenty of room on the ranch to relax and breed new bulls.

=== Death and legacy ===
On May 17, 2022, D&H Cattle Company announced that Bruiser had died. He was 11 years old. Significant riders include J.W. Harris, Daylon Swearingen, Derek Kolbaba, Cody Teel, and Ryan Dirteater.

== Honors ==
- 2015 ABBI Classic Champion
- 2015 PBR Reserve Champion Bull
- 2015 NFR Bull of the Finals
- 2016 PBR World Champion Bull
- 2016 PRCA Reserve Bull of the Year
- 2017 PBR World Champion Bull
- 2017 PBR Bull of the World Finals
- 2017 PRCA Bull of the Year
- 2017 NFR Bull of the Finals
- 2018 PBR World Champion Bull
- 2019 NFR Bull of the Finals
- ProBullStats Hall of Fame
- In 2023, was ranked No. 2 on the list of the top 30 bulls in PBR history.
- In September 2023, was posthumously awarded the PBR Brand of Honor at the National Cowboy & Western Heritage Museum in Oklahoma City, Oklahoma.
- In May 2024, was posthumously inducted into the Bull Riding Hall of Fame.

== Sources ==
- "Out List for 32Y SweetPro's Bruiser (31396)". ProBullStats Bull Riding Compedium. www.probullstats.com.
- 2018 PBR Media Guide – The PBR & Bull Riding Basics (PDF). Professional Bull Riders. 2018. Archived from the original (PDF) on March 2, 2019.
- PRCA Awards. Professional Rodeo Cowboys Association.
- Wrangler NFR. Professional Rodeo Cowboys Association. 2018.
