= Mason Lowe =

American bull rider (1993-2019)

Personal information
- Born: Mason Lee Lowe; September 12, 1993 Springfield, Missouri, U.S.
- Died: January 15, 2019 (aged 25) Denver, Colorado, U.S.
- Years active: 2012–2019
- Height: 5 ft 11 in (1.80 m)
- Weight: 155 lb (70 kg)

Sport
- Sport: Rodeo
- Event: Bull riding
- Turned pro: 2012

Achievements and titles
- Highest world ranking: 9th

Mason Lee Lowe (September 12, 1993 – January 15, 2019) was an American professional rodeo cowboy who specialized in bull riding, and competed in the Professional Bull Riders (PBR) circuit. He was ranked 18th in the PBR world standings at the time of his death.

== Early life ==
Mason Lowe was born in Springfield, Missouri, on September 12, 1993, to Stacy Lowe and Melissa Reed. He grew up in Exeter, Missouri. His interest in bull riding started as a toddler; when he was three years old he rode the milk calves on his family farm. He participated in junior rodeos, and skipped high school rodeos to enter the amateur bull riding aged fifteen, competing throughout the Midwest. About this choice, he said he sometimes regretted not participating at high school level, but also believed that he was more prepared for professional tours thanks to the amateur competitions. Watching the PBR growing up, he named Chris Shivers as his role model.

== Career ==
Lowe got his PBR card as soon as he turned eighteen. In 2013, he won the year-end title for the semi-pro National Federation of Professional Bullriders (NFPB). He competed in PBR tour circuits in the 2015 season, where he advanced to the PBR World Finals and earned $102,000. In his initial competitions, he was placed at 164th in the world. He suffered a wrist injury between seasons, in the summer of 2016. At the start of his second season, he was considered one of the talented up-and-coming riders in contention with the veteran riders. It was at the start of this season in Oklahoma City, Oklahoma, that he got his first 90-point ride, staying on Bruiser, owned by D&H Cattle Company, for 91 points. Towards the middle of his second season he had a run without placing in the top ten in six straight competitions, but in the seventh competition, he placed first at Albuquerque, New Mexico, taking his first win at a Built Ford Tough Series event.

After that, he did not compete over the winter, spending time in California to prevent injury, and returned in February 2017 at the Sprint Center in his home state of Missouri, being ranked 12th in the world at the start of 2017. At the Iron Cowboy event in February 2017 at the AT&T Stadium in Arlington, Texas, Lowe became only the second rider to complete a ride on Smooth Operator, owned by Chad Berger. With a 90.75 point ride, Lowe moved to 9th in world rankings. In early June 2017 he suffered a small injury from a completed ride, leaving him limping for a while but not interfering with his competition schedule. He won his next ride with another 8-second stay in the two-round competition, at the 14th J.W. Hart PBR Challenge. This feat moved him up to be 11th in the world. In the 2017 season he earned over $110,000 but by the start of the 2018 season, he had dropped back to be ranked 14th in the world.

Lowe always enjoyed competing near home.

He qualified for the PBR World Finals three times (2015–2017) but failed to qualify in 2018, his last full season.

== Death ==
Lowe was competing at a PBR Velocity Tour event at the Denver Coliseum as part of the National Western Stock Show in Denver, Colorado, on January 15, 2019, and was thrown from his bull. However, the bull — Hard Times, owned by Cervi Championship Rodeo, — then turned and his back legs stepped hard on his chest before moving off. Eyewitness reports said he did stand, then grasped his chest before collapsing. He was treated at Denver Health Medical Center, but died from extensive damage to his heart, heart valve, and aorta, the one-ton bull crushing his chest even though he was wearing a protective vest. He was ranked 18th in the PBR world standings at the time of his death. The following day of competition, all riders were wearing memorial patches. The PBR sent support to his wife, Abbey. The organization said that Hard Times would stay in competition because they believed the injury was done "absolutely unintentionally". Lowe was the third bull rider to be killed in PBR competition since the organization was founded.

His funeral service was held on January 23, 2019, at the Open Bible Praise Center in Boonville, Missouri.

Hard Times' final career out was in August 2020 at the Professional Rodeo Cowboys Association (PRCA) rodeo in Kalispell, Montana. By that point, the bull was now known as Chigger.

== Honors ==
In Lowe's memory, PBR riders wore memorial patches for the rest of the 2019 season. The organization also temporarily renamed their annual Premier Series event at the Enterprise Center in St. Louis, Missouri, as the Mason Lowe Memorial for said season.

The annual Ridin' with Mason Lowe memorial event in Cassville, Missouri, has been held since 2019. The event was cancelled in 2020 due to the COVID-19 pandemic, but returned in 2021. In 2019 and 2021, the Ridin' with Mason Lowe event was a part of the PBR's lower-level Touring Pro Division, but since 2022 has been an independent, unsanctioned event.

Since 2019, the PBR has awarded the Mason Lowe Award, given to the rider who scores the highest single ride during the regular season of the Unleash the Beast Series (UTB).

== Personal life ==
On June 9, 2018, Lowe married Abbey Cooper in Pilot Grove, Missouri. They lived in Rocheport, Missouri, with their dog Gator. After his death on January 15, 2019, Lowe left behind a widow, Abbey, and other family.

== See also ==
- Lane Frost
- Brent Thurman
- Glen Keeley
