= Chicken on a Chain =

American bucking bull (2001-2023)

- Sex: Bull
- Born: March 17, 2001
- Died: January 9, 2023 (aged 21); Mars Hill, North Carolina, U.S.
- Nationality: United States
- Years active: 2005–2012
- Owners: Robinson Bulls, Tedesco Bulls, Larry the Cable Guy
- Parent: 599 Scar (sire)
- Weight: 2,100 lb (950 kg)
- Appearance: Brown & White
- Awards: PBR Co-Bull of the World Finals 2007; PBR World Champion Bull 2007

Chicken on a Chain #CC (March 17, 2001 – January 9, 2023) was an American bucking bull. He competed in the Professional Bull Riders (PBR) circuit and won the 2007 PBR World Champion Bull title. In 2015, he was awarded the PBR Brand of Honor. He bucked for seven years, a total of 127 times; 33 of those times he was ridden at all levels. Chicken on a Chain finished his career with 130 outs (80 of them were at Built Ford Tough Series (BFTS) events). He holds a career average of 45 points per out and "arguably became the most popular bucking bull in PBR history". At the time he was active he was the only bucking bull in PBR history with more than 100 outs and an average career score of 45 or higher. Today, Chicken on a Chain is still considered one of the most popular bucking bulls. An article published on the PBR website on December 15, 2016, put him on the list "PBR Tough 10: Baddest Buckers."

In 2023, Chicken on a Chain was ranked No. 10 on the list of the top 30 bulls in PBR history.

== Background ==
Little information about Chicken's parentage is known, except that his sire was #599 Scar. In 2006, North Carolina stock contractor Jeff Robinson purchased Chicken on a Chain from a family "out in the sticks" in South Carolina. He purchased the bull from Ernie Treadway Rodeo Co. This is where the story of how Chicken got his name comes in. According to Robinson's bull handler, Clint Haas:

They went down 'ner and they knocked on the door and this little boy come to the door. They was like, 'We're here to pick up that bull.' That little boy says, 'Yes, dad told me you could have him, but said on one condition: he had to leave his name the same.' And Jeff's like, 'What his name?' And he says, 'Chicken on a Chain.' Jeff's like, 'Ok, how'd he get that name?' The boy says, 'That mean mother (expletive) got out and run through' – they had them, they was into cock fighting. You know how they got all them roosters staked out with a chain on the foot to keep them in place? Apparently he'd run through the prized fighting chickens and got the best rooster's chain wrapped around his foot. That little boy said it took us a damn two weeks to catch the son of gun to get the chain off. He drug a dead chicken for two weeks. After that they called him Chicken on a Chain.

For the bulk of that first year, the bull was mean and difficult, and Robinson contemplated selling. However, instead he "loaded him on his trailer and hauled him around from one Touring Pro Division event to another for much of the year". A couple of years after purchasing Chicken, he had a couple dozen more bulls. "You hear in sports where one guy carries a team," Robinson said. "Well, this bull carried me. He gave me the opportunity to be where I'm at. Without him I wouldn't be where I'm at, no doubt." Chicken on a Chain was a huge bull, and in his stock contractor's own words, he was described as, "impossible to miss." Black with lighter brown spots, he had huge horns. With a big white stripe that went all the way down his face, he weighed in at more than 2,100 pounds, and was called a "freak of nature" by many of the top PBR riders of the world because of his massive size and his athleticism.

== Career ==
Although Chicken on a Chain was purchased by stock contractor Jeff Robinson in 2006, Blue Collar comedian Larry the Cable Guy and Mike Tedesco also bought an interest in the bull that year. Chicken was just one of a few other bulls that Robinson co-owned with celebrities. Robinson stated, "He just called me one day and said he was interested in the bulls and it just went from there."

Chicken competed in the PBR from 2005 through 2012. By 2007, he hit his peak buck-off percentage and became the World Champion Bull that year. He was also the Co-Bull of the World Finals along with Troubadour. That same year, he bucked off a career best of 94.44 percent of the riders. He went on 18 outs, 12 of which were on the Built Ford Tough Series (BFTS). He bucked off 17 of those 18, with only one rider getting a qualified ride. Justin McBride, who would also win a world championship that year, made the whistle on him for 93 points at the BFTS event in Auburn Hills, Michigan. His average bull score for the whole year was 46.188. Another one of Chicken's famous outings occurred when Renato Nunes rode him in at the BFTS event in St. Louis, Missouri for 95.75 points in 2008. This outing brought them the 11th spot on the list of highest scores in PBR history at that time.

In 2009, Chicken was about a year past recovery from serious complications of kidney stones, and was "moving into a senior year age bracket for bucking bulls". But in September 2009, he was getting ready to buck at the BFTS event in Springfield, Missouri. He was one of the top ranked bulls scheduled to perform and "he can still move plenty fast enough to buck cowboys" into the dirt or into 90+ rides. As Robinson said, "So the moral to my story: Just because someone gets sick doesn't mean that they're done."

Brett Hoffman, who wrote articles for PBR, said, "One huge factor that impresses me about Chicken on a Chain is he's big and can move. I really admire any larger bull who can be compared to an offensive lineman in size and a defensive back in speed. That's one reason that I became a huge fan of the late Bodacious in the mid 1990s."

You just don't see bulls that big that can move like that." Robinson said of Chicken on a Chain. "The bad thing about this is you just don't come across bulls like that much anymore. Cody Lambert says all of the time that Chicken on a Chain is a throwback (to earlier eras of bull riding). He's a throwback to the kind of bulls that they used to get on, bulls that were big and stout and mean.

Brett Hoffman again, "The good news is that Chicken on a Chain is back and is going strong. He'll always stand out in my mind, and without a doubt, he's a big hit with many fans." "I had a guy come up to me one time and said Chicken on a Chain is my favorite bull," Robinson said. "I asked, 'Why?' The guy said something to the effect that he had the look, the attitude and the name and when it comes to bucking bulls, you just don't get that total package."

Chicken on a Chain's last out came during Round 4 at the PBR World Finals at the Thomas & Mack Center in Las Vegas, Nevada. He went head to head with two-time PBR world champion Chris Shivers. He bucked off Shivers at 6.73 seconds and the bull won his last ride before retiring. Shivers still had two more rides the next night and then he also was going to retire.

As of 2015, Chicken on a Chain at the end of his career had a total of 130 outs. 80 of those 130 outs were at the BFTS level. Chicken on a Chain finished his career with an average of 45 points per out. At that time, he was the only bull in the PBR who had more than 100 outs and that average score of 45 points (or higher). He was ranked fourth on the list of 90-point ride producers. He was the high-marked bull 41 times out of all of those 80 BFTS events he participated in. Of the 27 times he was ridden in his career, 13 times did the rider win the round. As of December 2016, he was ranked 65th. Chicken on a Chain qualified for the PBR World Finals six out of the seven years he competed, earning an average bull score of 44.98.

Former PBR bull rider Brendon Clark said,

I remember seeing him at some Touring Pro (Division events), early on, and he was really wild. For a bull his size, super-athletic is the best way to explain him doing it at this level. That's amazing. He's a bull that went for a long time without getting ridden, and then some of the best rides I've seen have been from that bull. Justin McBride and Renato Nunes are two that come to mind. He was an exceptional bull.

Former PBR bull rider Ben Jones said,

He was big and had two horns as big as baseball bats, so if you were going to get him rode you had to be a bull rider. You couldn't be half-hearted.

Future two-time PBR world champion J.B. Mauney said,

When I first saw that bull he was probably the meanest bull I had ever seen. I hung up on him a few times and that got pretty scary. He's a big ol' bull and he's been great for a long time. There are not many bulls that can go that long, travel as many miles as he traveled and still be that good. He'll go down as being one of the best bulls ever. He had heart, plus he weighed about 2,000 pounds.

Chicken on a Chain was a fan favorite during his time. He had success each year in the PBR and was introduced to "the loudest standing ovation".

== Retirement and death ==
Chicken on a Chain spent the last several years of his life in retirement on Jeff Robinson's ranch in Mars Hill, North Carolina. He would sell some of Chicken's semen to other bucking bull stock contractors for breeding with cows.

Per Jeff Robinson, Chicken died on January 9, 2023. The bull was 21 years old.

== Honors ==
- 2007 Co-Bull of the PBR World Finals with Troubadour
- 2007 PBR World Champion Bull
- 2015 PBR Brand of Honor
- ProBullStats Hall of Fame
- 2023 ranked No. 10 on the list of the top 30 bulls in PBR history
