= Kasey Hayes =

American bull rider

Kasey Hayes (born August 16, 1985) is an American former professional rodeo cowboy who specialized in bull riding, and competed in the Professional Bull Riders (PBR)'s Built Ford Tough Series tour. He is one of the few riders to come from the PBR's minor league series and win his very first premier series event that same weekend (that being the 2006 Tulsa Express PBR Classic in Tulsa, Oklahoma). Hayes also briefly competed in the Professional Rodeo Cowboys Association (PRCA) and Championship Bull Riding (CBR) circuits. After suffering a major head injury early in his career, Hayes began riding with a protective face mask underneath his cowboy hat. However, by 2010, he was riding with a full helmet. He qualified for the CBR World Finals in 2005 and the PBR World Finals from 2006 through 2010 and 2014 through 2016. He retired from professional bull riding after the 2016 PBR season with pride. Hayes currently resides in Liberal, Kansas.

== Biography ==
Raised in the plains of western Kansas, Kasey Hayes topped his first steer at the age of nine. With the guidance of his father, Hayes progressed to junior bulls and then big bulls. He won the bull riding title in the Kansas High School Rodeo Association after two years as reserve champion. At the age of 12, he was badly injured at an open bull riding in Kingman, Kansas. He received a concussion and a fractured skull. The injury put him out for two weeks, and he had ridden with a face mask in every event since; around 2010, he made the transition to a full helmet. Hayes took Tulsa by storm in July 2006, winning the third round with a 90-point ride and earning over $36,000 for the event championship.
