= Built Ford Tough Series =

Professional Bull Riders competition

- Most recent season or competition: 2017 BFTS season
- Formerly: Bud Light Cup Series (1994–2002)
- Sport: Bull riding
- Founded: December 8, 2002; 23 years ago
- First season: 2003
- Last season: 2017
- Folded: January 5, 2018; 8 years ago
- Replaced by: Unleash the Beast Series
- Organizing body: Professional Bull Riders
- Country: United States; Mexico; Canada
- Headquarters: Colorado Springs, Colorado, U.S. (2002–2007); Pueblo, Colorado, U.S. (2007–2017)
- Last champion: Jess Lockwood (2017)
- Most titles: Silvano Alves (3 titles)
- Broadcasters: NBCSN (2003–2012) (Note: NBCSN was known as Outdoor Life Network (OLN) from 1995 to 2006 and Versus from 2006 to 2012.); CBSSN (2013–2017)
- Sponsors: Ford Trucks (2003–2017); Las Vegas (2003); Wrangler (2004–2017)

The Built Ford Tough Series (BFTS) was a professional bull riding tour organized by the Professional Bull Riders (PBR) that acted as the organization's premier series from 2003 to 2017.

== Inaugural season (2003) ==
The BFTS kicked off its tour on November 16, 2002, with the Mohegan Sun Invitational in Uncasville, Connecticut. The majority of the series was televised on the Outdoor Life Network (OLN). Six of the series events were broadcast on NBC. Telemundo broadcast two events. The first run of the series was held in 29 cities. The BFTS featured the world's top 45 riders at each event throughout the season. The 45 riders who earned the most money at all PBR-sanctioned events qualified to compete at the PBR Built Ford Tough World Finals at the Thomas and Mack Center in Las Vegas, Nevada. If a rider failed to maintain his ranking by not earning enough money, he could be replaced by another rider from the U.S. Smokeless Tobacco Company Challenger Tour who earned more money.

In 2003, Bud Light was replaced by Ford Trucks as the PBR Premier Series' title sponsor, but Las Vegas was kept as the presenting sponsor, thus the Bud Light Cup Series presented by Las Vegas became the Built Ford Tough Series presented by Las Vegas. This was also the first season in the PBR where the World Champion received a $1 million bonus. The 2003 Built Ford Tough World Finals was the last in which there were five rounds, in which all riders rode in the first four rounds and the top 15 rode in the Championship Round.

Some BFTS events would be broadcast on Telemundo through the 2006 season, and some BFTS events would be broadcast on NBC through the 2012 season.

== 2004 season changes ==
In 2004, the Wrangler jeans company replaced Las Vegas as the Built Ford Tough Series' presenting sponsor, thus it was now known as the Built Ford Tough Series presented by Wrangler. That same year, the PBR introduced an enhanced scoring system to the World Finals to make sure the champion is not determined prior to the event. First, 5,500 potential points were available, that ensured any of the top ten riders headed to the event had a chance to win the title. The first place competitor in a round scored 400 points. The second place competitor scored 350 points. Riders placing between third and 10 were awarded points on an incremental scale down to 15. And riders also received the points they earned for a qualified ride.

The PBR returned to having some three-day regular season events, after having stopped from 1996 to 2003.

There were now eight rounds in the PBR World Finals divided into two weekends. The first three rounds took place at the Mandalay Bay Events Center, and the final five took place at the Thomas and Mack Center. All of the riders competed in the first seven rounds. The top 15 riders advanced to the Championship Round. The rider who won the World Finals received 2,500 BFTS points and $250,000. Second place received 2,250 points. And the riders placing between 3rd and 10th received points on an incremental scale down to 250.

== 2005 season changes ==
In 2005, a change was made to the tour. Wherein upon the conclusion of every fifth event on the series, the five lowest ranked riders were sent down to the Challenger Tour. It was based on money earned. Then the top five Challenger Tour riders were sent up to the BFTS. This shifting ensured the best riders competed at the right levels of competition. The Challenger Tour was used as a means as providing talent to the BFTS. Additionally, BFTS riders could freely compete in the Challenger Tour and the Humps n' Horns Tour events assuming no conflicts would occur. BFTS riders might have done this because money earned at lower level tours also counted towards reaching the desired top-ranked 45 riders standings.

== 2006 season changes ==
Beginning in 2006, qualified rides were now scored with a quarter-point system (as opposed to whole points or half points in previous seasons, a system which was first tested at the 2004 and 2005 PBR World Finals), which remained in place through 2025.

Following the 2006 BFTS event in Grand Rapids, Michigan, OLN's name was changed to Versus. Also that year, the PBR began producing events in Canada, Mexico, Brazil, and Australia. Starting with the 2006 PBR World Finals, the top contestant from each of the international tours was invited to compete at the first three rounds of the PBR World Finals along with the top 45 money-earners who qualified for the event. If any of the international invitees succeeded in finishing among the top 15 riders based on total points after the first three rounds, they were invited to compete for the rest of the World Finals. If they were not among the top fifteen, they were eliminated from the rest of the event.

From 2006 through 2008, the last few regular-season BFTS events were broadcast on Fox.

== 2007 season changes ==
In 2007, the Built Ford Tough Series practiced the First to Fail format, where the order of the top five riders going into the Championship Round of the event was reversed, meaning the leader would ride first and the 5th-place rider would ride last. This format proved unpopular with fans and the Championship Round was reverted to its original format in 2008.

== 2008 season changes ==
From 2004 through 2007, the first three rounds of the PBR World Finals took place at Mandalay Bay Events Center, but in 2008 and 2009 all eight rounds now took place at the Thomas and Mack Center.

== 2009 season changes ==
In 2009, Wrangler was dropped as the Built Ford Tough Series' presenting sponsor. However, the tour did not pick up a new presenting sponsor, thus it was now known simply as the Built Ford Tough Series. Also, after the first five events of the BFTS this season, the number of riders on the tour was cut from 45 to 40. Qualifying for the PBR World Finals was now based on the top 40 money earners.

== 2010 season changes ==
The PBR World Finals' format changed to the one used in 1995 where all contestants rode in the first five rounds, then the top 15 advanced to the Championship Round. Starting with the 2010 World Finals, the top rider from each of the PBR's international tours was invited to compete at the event's first two rounds along with the top 40 money-earners who qualified for the event. If any of the international invitees was among the top 15 riders based on total points after two rounds, they were invited to compete at the rest of the World Finals. If they were not among the top 15, they were eliminated from the competition. The rider who won the World Finals event received 2,500 BFTS points and $250,000. Second place received 2,250 points. The riders placing between 3rd and 10th received points on an incremental scale down to 250.

== 2012 season changes ==
In 2012, the BFTS was now primarily televised on CBS Sports Network. Some events were also televised on NBC Sports Network (formerly Versus, before changing to NBC Sports Network at the start of 2012). After the first five events of the BFTS season, the number of riders on the tour was cut from 40 to 35. Also, qualification for the PBR World Finals was now determined by the top 35 point earners. Previously, from 2009 to 2011 qualifying for the World Finals was based on the top 40 money earners.

2012 was the year in which the 15/15 Bucking Battle was introduced. At select regular-season BFTS events after the conclusion of the first round, the top 15 riders at the time of the event were randomly matched up against 15 of the rankest bulls in the PBR for an opportunity to win additional points. The 15/15 Bucking Battles were broadcast on CBS.

== 2013 season changes ==
The BFTS regular-season events and the World Finals were now televised entirely on CBS Sports Network, while the 15/15 Bucking Battles were broadcast on CBS.

== 2014 season changes ==
In 2014, the BFTS was then known as the nationally televised elite tour of the PBR. At that time, the tour was composed of the world's top 35 bull riders facing down the world's toughest bulls. The tour made 27 stops in 19 states that year. It opened with its first event at the Madison Square Garden in New York City, New York. It concluded in Las Vegas, Nevada, with the PBR BFTS World Finals. The PBR BFTS World Finals were bull riding's richest and it awarded almost $2.3 million that year if the $1 million bonus to the world champion is counted as well as the $10,000 belt buckle.

In 2014, the BFTS followed these rules. The PBR BFTS World Champion was the bull rider who accumulated the most points while competing in events in the regular season and in the world finals event. The BFTS used the point system to be certain the most consistent rider became the World Champion Bull Rider. Points were earned at each event for a rider's finish in each round and in the event. First place received 100 points. Second place received 90 points. Remaining riders between third and 10th place received points on an incremental scale.

Each BFTS event contained a round with 35 bull rides. For a two-day event, the 35 bull riders competed in Rounds 1 and 2. The top 15 scores advanced to the BFTS Championship Round. The event winner was the rider with the highest combined score from all three rounds. The winner received 300 points. The second place finisher received 270 points. Riders placing between third and 10th received points in an incremental scale down to 30.

For a three-day event, the 35 bull riders competed in Rounds 1, 2, and 3. The top 15 scores advanced to the BFTS Championship Round. The event winner was the rider with the highest combined score from all four rounds. The winner received 400 points. The second place finisher received 260 points. Riders placing between third and 10th received points in an incremental scale down to 40.

In 2004, the PBR introduced an enhanced scoring system to the BFTS World Finals to make sure the champion is not determined prior to the event. These rules were still followed until 2015, when they were slightly modified by removing qualified ride scores from World Standings points totals. First, 5,500 potential points were available, that ensured any of the top ten riders heading to the event had a chance to win the title. The first place competitor in a round scored 400 points. The second place competitor scored 350 points. Riders placing between third and 10 were awarded points on an incremental scale down to 15. And riders also received the points they earned for a qualified ride.

There were six rounds in the PBR World Finals. All of the riders competed in the first five rounds. The top 15 riders advanced to the Championship Round. The rider who won the Finals event received 2,500 BFTS points and $250,000. Second place received 2,250 points. And the riders placing between 3rd and 10th received points on an incremental scale down to 250.

Riders could qualify for the PBR BFTS World Finals in several ways. One way was by competing in BFTS events throughout the season. They could also compete in the Touring Pro Division and international events. Countries where they could compete are Australia, Brazil, Canada, and Mexico.

== 2015 season changes ==
For 2015 and beyond, the PBR modified the PBR BFTS points system. The BFTS World Champion Bull Rider is the one who accumulated the most world points during the regular season and the World Finals combined. Prior to 2015, the points system was focused on making sure the most consistent rider became the World Champion. However, the PBR's founders have always desired the bull rider who wins consistently be the one who wins the most events; thus, the championship. So starting in 2015, a new points system went into effect. The change affected all of the PBR's tours, the 15/15 Bucking Battle, and the international tours in Australia, Brazil, Canada, and Mexico. Qualified ride scores were no longer included in the World Standings point totals. They were, however, used to determine placements in event rounds and event aggregates, and to determine both event and World Standings.

Each BFTS event contained a round with 35 bull rides. For a two-day event, the 35 bull riders would compete in Round 1 and 2. The top 15 scores advanced to the BFTS Championship Round. The event winner was the rider with the highest combined score from all three rounds. For a three-day event, the 35 bull riders will compete in Rounds 1, 2, and 3. The top 15 scores advanced to the BFTS Championship Round. The event winner was the rider with the highest combined score from all three rounds.

There were four events on the BFTS that were considered major events. They were New York City, New York; Arlington, Texas; Las Vegas, Nevada; and Nashville, Tennessee. Major events offered competition in different formats, bonus bulls, and more prize money. These major events were broadcast on CBS. Together, these four major events composed the PBR Grand Slam Series.

The 15/15 Bucking Battles were offered at some PBR BFTS events. This type of event matched the top 15 bull riders in the PBR against the top 15 bulls at the event. The matching was random. There was a separate purse for this event. Points were earned at the rate of 1 and 1/2 times the round points. Points did not factor into the winner but did count toward the World Standings. The winner was the bull rider with the highest ride score.

Qualifying for the PBR BFTS World Finals was based on points. Points could be earned on all of the PBR's tours: Built Ford Tough Series, Velocity Tour, Touring Pro Division and the International tours. International tours included Australia, Brazil, Canada, and Mexico. The top 35 ranked riders in the World Standings according to points earned competed at the World Finals. The Velocity Tour year-end champion, the top three highest-ranked finishers at the Velocity Tour Finals, and the highest-ranked finishing international invitee representing one of PBR's four international circuits at the Velocity Tour Finals received wild-card berths to the World Finals.

The 2015 BFTS World Finals concluded in Las Vegas, Nevada. It awarded almost $2.2 million. This included the $1 million bonus to the World Champion. The World Champion also received a $10,000 championship belt buckle. This was the 17th and final time the PBR World Finals would take place at the Thomas & Mack Center.

== 2016 season changes ==
In 2016, the PBR World Finals moved to T-Mobile Arena on the Las Vegas Strip.

Following the 2017 World Finals, the Built Ford Tough Series was rebranded as the Unleash the Beast Series.

== Bibliography ==
- Johnstone, Jeffrey; Cartwright, Keith Ryan (2009). Professional bull riders : the official guide to the toughest sport on Earth. Chicago, Ill.: Triumph Books. p. 4. ISBN 978-1-60078-301-2. LCCN 2009029650. OCLC 310401236.
- 2014 PBR Media Guide (PDF). Professional Bull iders. 2014. Archived from the original (PDF) on January 27, 2018.
- 2016 PBR Media Guide (PDF). Professional Bull Riders. 2016. Archived from the original (PDF) on August 13, 2018.
