= Shepherd Hills Tested =

American bucking bull (2008-2017)

- Breed: American Bucking Bull
- Sex: Bull
- Born: 2008; Ardmore, Oklahoma
- Died: April 14, 2017 (aged 9); Lebanon, Missouri
- Nationality: United States
- Years active: 2011 – 2014
- Owners: D&H Cattle, Shepherd Hills Cutlery, Powder River Rodeo Company, Duckwall, Tom Luthy III
- Parents: 194 Smooth Move (sire); Page #502 (dam)
- Weight: 1,700 lb (771 kg)
- Appearance: Black
- Awards: 2014 PBR Reserve World Champion Bull; 2013 PRCA Bull of the Year; 2013 PBR Reserve World Champion Bull; 2012 ABBI Classic Champion; 2012 PRCA Bull of the NFR

Shepherd Hills Tested #20U (2008 – April 14, 2017) was an American bucking bull. He bucked on the Professional Rodeo Cowboys Association (PRCA) and Professional Bull Riders (PBR) circuits from 2011-2014. His first title was the 2012 American Bucking Bull (ABBI) Classic World Champion. He went on to win the 2012 Bull of the Finals title at the PRCA's National Finals Rodeo (NFR) later that same year. In 2013, he won the PRCA Bull of the Year title and was also the PBR Reserve World Champion Bull. In his last year bucking, he repeated as the 2014 PBR Reserve World Champion Bull. In 84 times out of the bucking chute over a four years period, Tested only allowed cowboys four qualified rides; two rides by two-time PBR world champion J.B. Mauney and two rides by Kasey Hayes. His owners retired him after the 2014 season. He died from injuries sustained in an accident on April 14, 2017.

== Background ==
Shepherd Hills Tested was born in 2008 as Smooth Grove, the name by which he was known for his first three years. One of his co-owners is one of the largest stock contractors in the business; D&H Cattle Company, run by Dillon Page and his son H.D. Page. Other co-owners included Tom Luthy III of Rogersville, Duckwall, Powder River Rodeo Company, and the company Shepherd Hills Cutlery. When Shepherd Hills Cutlery became part owner, the bull was renamed. Shepherd Hills Tested's sire was #194 Smooth Move. Smooth Move was a PBR World Finals bull. He was also the sire to PBR World Champion bull contender Stone Sober. His paternal grandsire was Kish's Top Gun, and his paternal granddam was Kish #002. His dam was Page #502. His maternal grandsire was #22 Hotel California. From 2002 to 2004, Hotel California maintained a buckoff streak on the elite tour of the PBR, the Built Ford Tough Series (BFTS) that took three-time World Champion Adriano Moraes to break it. Cody Lambert, the PBR Director of Livestock, considered him one of the top five contenders for the 2005 World Champion bull contenders. As of December 2017, Hotel California is ranked 34th on the BFTS All Time Rank, and 32nd on the Historical Ranking on ProBullStats.com. Shepherd Hills Tested's maternal granddam was TBB K304. He was registered as an American Bucking Bull, he was a black bull, and he weighed approximately 1,700 pounds (770 kg).

== Career ==
Shepherd Hills Tested competed on both the PRCA circuit and on the elite Built Ford Tough Series (BFTS) tour of the PBR.

=== 2011 season ===
In the 2011 season, at age three, Shepherd Hills Tested was still named D&H's Smooth Groove, but competed several times on the PRCA circuit.

Shepherd Hills Tested competed in the PBR a couple times on the circuit's lower tours. Then he competed at a BFTS event in Billings, Montana, in September. He bucked off Colby Yates in 2.99 seconds for an even 45 points. Then he bucked off Reese Cates in 2.14 seconds for a decent score of 44.25 points. Finally, he bucked in one round in the PBR BFTS World Finals at the Thomas & Mack Center in Las Vegas, Nevada, where he bucked off Dusty Ephrom in 5.67 seconds and earned an average bull score of 43 points.

Shepherd Hills Tested competed in the PRCA regular season at least five times. In May 2011 in Eagle Mountain, Utah, he bucked off Boedie Evans in 4 seconds for a score of 39 points. Also in May 2011 in Eagle Mountain, Utah, he bucked off Carter Downing in 4 seconds for a score of 42 points. In July 2011 in Estes Park, Colorado, he bucked off Cody Wooldrige in 4 seconds for a score of 45 points. In August 2011 in Riverton, Wyoming, he bucked off Chance Smart. Also in August 2011, in Grace, Idaho, he bucked off Trenten Montero in 2.55 seconds and earned a score of 43 points. He bucked in competition at the 2011 NFR two times in December. He bucked off Wesley Silcox in 4.08 seconds for an exceptional bull score of 47 points. Then he bucked off Steve Woolsey in 4.40 seconds for another high bull score of 46. He also won the most money in the regular season of the ABBI in 2011.

=== 2012 season ===
In January 2012, at a PBR event in Denver, Colorado, Shepherd Hills Tested bucked off Zane Lambert in 2.20 seconds for a bull score of 43.50. Also in January 2012, at a PBR event in Pueblo, Colorado, Shepherd Hills Tested bucked off Duty LaBeth in 2.03 seconds for a bull score of 44.50. In February 2012, at a PBR BFTS event in Oklahoma City, Oklahoma, Shepherd Hills Tested bucked off Austin Meier in 5.18 seconds for a bull score of 45.25. In February 2012, at a PBR BFTS event in Houston, Texas, Shepherd Hills Tested bucked off two-time world champion Chris Shivers in 5.38 seconds for a bull score of 46 points.

In March 2012, at a PBR BFTS event in Arlington, Texas, Shepherd Hills Tested bucked off J.B. Mauney in 4.73 seconds for a bull score of 45 points. In March 2012, at a PBR BFTS event in Kansas City, Missouri, Shepherd Hills Tested bucked off Caleb Sanderson in 2.61 seconds for a bull score of 43.75 points. In April 2012, at a PBR event in Stephenville, Texas, Shepherd Hills Tested bucked off Bonner Bolton in 1.68 seconds for a bull score of 43.50 points. In May 2012, at a PBR BFTS event in Nampa, Idaho, Shepherd Hills Tested bucked off Fabiano Vieira in 7.24 seconds for a bull score of 44.50 points. In May 2012, at a PBR BFTS event in Pueblo, Colorado, Shepherd Hills Tested bucked off Ryan Dirteater in 4.62 seconds for a bull score of 44.75 points.

In June 2012 at a PBR event in Ardmore, Oklahoma, Shepherd Hills Tested bucked off Jay Epstein in 1.34 seconds for a bull score of 44.50 points. In July 2012 at a PRCA event in Estes Park, Colorado, Shepherd Hills Tested had a couple of no scores. In July 2012 at a PBR event in Grand Junction, Colorado, Shepherd Hills Tested bucked off Justin Arendt in 1.99 seconds for a bull score of 45 points. In August 2012 at a PBR BFTS event in Tulsa, Oklahoma, Shepherd Hills Tested bucked off 2008 World Champion Guilherme Marchi in 4.44 seconds for a bull score of 44.25 points. In August 2012 at a PBR BFTS event in Thackerville, Oklahoma, Shepherd Hills Tested bucked off 2004 World Champion Mike Lee in 3.46 seconds for a bull score of 44.25 points.

As of August 1, 2012, D&H Cattle was making a big push for Shepherd Hills Tested to win the American Bucking Bull, Inc., (ABBI) Classic Championship. He had impressed the judges the most this season at Classic events, which are events held for 3 and 4-year-olds by the ABBI. The bull was also a fan favorite. However, bull riders were finding him tough to ride due to his power. He had thrown off such notable riders as J.B. Mauney, Chris Shivers, Austin Meier, and Ryan Dirteater.

ABBI Executive Director Kaycee Simpson noticed that the Pages, owners of D&H Cattle, were hauling Shepherd Hills Tested to every classic event they could. They had already earned $50,000 with him as of August 2012. That year in Las Vegas, Nevada, the 3 or 4-year-old bull with the highest score was to win $250,000 for first place. Simpson said of Tested, "We want the best Classic bull in the world to win...The caliber of Classic bulls is that high this year. He has some stiff competition." In the end, Shepherd Hills Tested secured a win for the ABBI Classic Championship as a 4-year-old in 2012. In his entire Classic career (competing as a 3 and 4-year-old in the ABBI), the bull pulled down a total of $339,570.39.

In September 2012 at a PBR BFTS event in Nashville, Tennessee, Shepherd Hills Tested bucked off Aaron Roy in 3.35 seconds for a bull score of 44.50 points. In September 2012 at a PBR BFTS event in Springfield, Missouri, Shepherd Hills Tested bucked off HD Coleman in 2.57 seconds for a bull score of 44.25 points. In September 2012 at a PRCA event in Omaha, Nebraska, Shepherd Hills Tested bucked off Trevor Kastner in 4.23 seconds for a bull score of 44 points.

In September 2012, J.B. Mauney made a qualified ride on Shepherd Hills Tested; he was the first rider ever to do so. The ride took place at a PBR BFTS event in Springfield, Missouri. Mauney scored 92.50 points out of a possible 100 on Shepherd Hills Tested, whose bull score was a solid 45.25 out of a possible 50. The ride won the event for Mauney. The bull turned in the rider's left hand nicely. This let Mauney gain the bull's rhythm while the bull attempted to outpower him in the front end.

Co-owner H.D. Page of D&H Cattle said when Tested got upset when a rider made a qualified ride on him and he got beat. "The bull doesn't believe he did his job right. So the next time he goes out, his desire to win is stronger." Page explained that Shepherd Hills Tested usually proved himself after such a loss by winning rebound events. As an example, in September 2012, Mauney rode Shepherd Hills Tested for 92.5 points at the PFIwestern.com Invitational presented by Bass Pro Shops in Springfield, Missouri. After that, the 3-year-old bull bounced back at a rodeo in Oklahoma City, Oklahoma, to buck off Brant Atwood in 4 seconds for 46.5 points.

In October 2012 at the PBR BFTS Finals at the Thomas & Mack Center in Las Vegas, Nevada, Shepherd Hills Tested competed two times. His first out was against Davi Henrique where he bucked him off in 4.75 seconds for a bull score of 43.75. Next, he bucked off Mauney in 4.76 seconds for a bull score of 46 points.

In December 2012, at the NFR, at the Thomas & Mack Center in Las Vegas, Nevada, Shepherd Hills Tested competed two times. First, Shepherd Hills Tested bucked off PRCA world champion Cody Teel in 4 seconds for an exceptional bull score of 47 points. Next, he bucked off Trevor Kastner in 4 seconds with another exceptional bull score of 47 points. This performance at the NFR brought Shepherd Hills Tested the PRCA Bucking Bull of the NFR Finals title.

=== 2013 season ===
On January 25 and 26, 2013, Shepherd Hills Tested competed at the PBR BFTS WinStar World Casino Invitational at the Chesapeake Energy Arena in Oklahoma City, Oklahoma. PBR bull rider Jory Markiss failed to ride Tested on Friday night the 25th when he was bucked off in 2.61 seconds, and Tested earned a bull score of 44.50 points. Markiss got a second chance that night because he won the round and Tested was the bonus bull for the round winner. The bonus round was worth $3,000. Markiss got bucked off again, this time in 4.99 seconds, with Shepherd Hills Tested earning a bull score of 45.50 seconds.

In February 2013, at a PRCA event in San Antonio, Texas, Shepherd Hills bucked off Parker Breding in 2.20 seconds for bull score of 44 points. In March 2013, in Arlington, Texas, at the PBR BFTS Iron Cowboy event in AT&T Stadium, Shepherd Hills Tested bucked off Austin Meier in 1.91 seconds for a career high bull score of 46.75 points, which still stands today. Tested burst out of the bucking chute with Meier on his back so fast that Meier just slipped off. In March 2013, at a PRCA event in Austin, Texas, Shepherd Hills Tested bucked off Tag Elliot in 1.80 seconds for an outstanding bull score of 48 points.

In April 2013, at a PBR BFTS event in Billings, Montana, J.B. Mauney and Shepherd Hills Tested met up for the fourth time. Mauney selected the bull in the BFTS championship round draft. Mauney was one of only two riders to ever score a qualified ride on the bull, but was not afraid to admit the bull had embarrassed him several times. "That bull is hard to ride," Mauney said. "I rode him twice and he shit-canned me a lot of times." Mauney particularly remembers this fourth attempt when Shepherd Hills Tested knocked him unconscious. Tested burst out of the bucking chute fast. "He came back to the left and I fell back and all my weight was on my feet and my feet came straight up over him. I was hung upside down the side of him and when he came around he caught me with both back feet and slapped me into the ground". Mauney was down and out." The judges marked Shepherd Hills Tested a high score of 45.75 points for his efforts. In another example of Tested's "rebound" tendency, in October 2013, Mauney rode him in McAlester, Oklahoma. After that, Shepherd Hills Tested turned around and, at his next event on his way to earning the PRCA championship, bucked off Josh Koschel and Trey Benton. In November 2013, at the J.W. Hart PBR Tour Pro Division event in McAlester, Oklahoma, Mauney rode Tested for a qualified ride for the second and last time. Mauney scored 90.50 points, while the bull made a 44-point bull score. The ride came about a month after Mauney won his first world championship in 2013.

In June 2013, at a PRCA event in Decatur, Texas, Shepherd Hills Tested bucked off Randy Quartieri in 1.03 seconds for a bull score of 45 points. In August 2013, at a PRCA event in Castle Rock, Colorado, Shepherd Hills Tested bucked off Bobby Welsh in 1.30 seconds for a bull score of 45 points. In August 2013 at a PRCA event in Caldwell, Idaho, Shepherd Hills Tested bucked off Cooper Davis in 2.20 seconds for a bull score of 45.50 points.

In October 2013, Shepherd Hills Tested competed twice at the PBR BFTS World Finals that year at the Thomas & Mack Center in Las Vegas, Nevada. He scored 46 points bucking off Chase Outlaw in 3.78 seconds and 47.75 points bucking off Markus Mariluch in 1.53 seconds. Shepherd Hills Tested performed so well that year, he took home the 2013 PBR Reserve World Champion Bull title, coming in second to Bushwacker.

In December 2013, Shepherd Hills Tested competed in the finals of the PRCA, the NFR, which took place at the Thomas & Mack Center in Las Vegas, Nevada. His first out took place against Josh Koshel, where Tested bucked him off in 4 seconds for a bull score of 45 points. Next, Tested took on Trey Benton, whom he also bucked off in 4 seconds, and garnered a bull score of 44 points. Shepherd Hills Tested performed so well that year, he took home the 2013 PRCA Bull of the Year title. The year 2013 was one of the bull's best years. He had a 26-0 record across of levels of competition, as well as a 13-0 record on the BFTS.

=== 2014 season ===
In January 2014, at a PBR event in Denver, Colorado, Shepherd Hills Tested bucked off Chase Outlaw in 4 seconds for a bull score of 46 points. Also in January 2014, at a PBR event in Pueblo, Colorado, Shepherd Hills Tested bucked off 2004 World Champion Mike Lee in 4.70 seconds for a bull score of 44 points. Also in January 2014, at a PBR BFTS event in Oklahoma City, Oklahoma, Shepherd Hills Tested bucked off João Ricardo Viera in 4.4 seconds for a bull score of 40.50 points. Also in January 2014, at PBR BFTS event in Sacramento, California, Shepherd Hills Tested bucked off Austin Meier in 4.05 seconds for a bull score of 45.25 points. In February 2014, at a PBR BFTS event in Anaheim, California, Shepherd Hills Tested bucked off Matt Triplett in 2.21 seconds for a bull score of 38.75. Again at that same event, Tested bucked off J.B. Mauney in 5.17 seconds for a bull score of 43.75.

In March 2014, at an event in Arlington, Texas, Shepherd Hills Tested, bucked off three-time world champion Silvano Alves in 2.13 seconds for a bull score of 45 points. In March 2014, at a PBR BFTS event in Albuquerque, New Mexico, Shepherd Hills Tested bucked off Brady Sims in 4.07 seconds for a bull score of 44.75 points. Also in March 2014, at a PBR BFTS event in Fresno, California, Shepherd Hills Tested bucked off Tanner Byrne in .98 seconds for a bull score of 45 seconds. At the same event in Fresno, Shepherd Hills Tested bucked off Valdiron de Oliveira in .86 seconds for a bull score of 44.25 points.

In May 2014, at a PBR BFTS event in Colorado Springs, Colorado, Tested fouled Fabiano Viera who got a reride bull. later at the same event, veteran Kasey Hayes rode Tested for a score of 91.5 points. He broke the bull's streak of 21 buckoffs. Shepherd Hills Tested received a bull score of 45 points on that ride. Hayes knew going into the ride that Shepherd Hills Tested was one of the hardest bulls to ride in the PBR and that only J.B. Mauney had ridden him twice. Hayes said he was prepared "to be on his A game and do everything right" so he could score a qualified ride from the bull and avoid injury. "It was the perfect ride on a really strong bull," Lambert said. "It had to be one of Kasey's career highlights, but it would have been anyone's career highlight because he was so strong when he bucked that if you didn’t ride him perfect you didn't have a chance." Then later that month in Las Vegas, Nevada, at the Last Cowboy Standing PBR BFTS event, Tested had his rebound from Colorado Springs by bucking off 2010 world champion Renato Nunes in 5.92 seconds for a bull score of 45.75 points.

Next was the J.W. Hart PBR Challenge, beginning Saturday night, May 31, 2014, in Decatur, Texas. The event ran on the PBR Touring Pro Division, which is not as elite as the BFTS tour. However, Hart ran this event every year with as many top ranked bulls as he could get and it always lined up more closely with a BFTS elite tour event. Competing that year in the championship round were bulls like Jack Daniel's After Party, David's Dream, Jack Daniel's Tennessee Honey, Pound the Alarm, and Stone Sober. As a result of Hart's efforts, two-time PBR world champion J.B. Mauney and four-time PRCA bull riding world champion J.W. Harris were matched against 2012 PBR World Champion Bull Asteroid, and 2013 PRCA Bull of the Year Shepherd Hills Tested. Hart put up $25,000 in a winner-take-all challenge for his event that year. The match between the duo was titled the 1,000 Miles From Home $25,000 winner-take-all challenge.

Prior to this event, Shepherd Hills Tested had been ridden for a qualified ride only twice in the last 35 outs (trips out of the bucking chute) and had an average bull score of 44.68 points over his last 38 outs. Tested had already bucked off eight riders in 2014, and had a 94.74 buck off percentage just prior to the Decatur event.

His nine challengers by May 2014 included 2013 Rookie of the Year João Ricardo Vieira, 2013 World Champion J.B. Mauney and 2010 World Champion Renato Nunes. His ride by Hayes was his only qualified ride. The PBR considered Tested and Asteroid two of the greatest bulls to buck that year. Harris and Mauney, each drew for the two bulls, with Mauney drawing Asteroid, and Harris drawing Tested. "Mauney has successfully ridden Shepherd Hills Tested twice in six attempts and conquered Asteroid once in three tries". Mauney had made a qualified ride on Asteroid for 93.5 points in 2012. Harris had yet to attempt either bull.

All of the bull riding events, including the match-up, occurred at the Wise County Fairgrounds, which was sold out, on Saturday night. It was a long evening of bull riding in the 1,000 Miles From Home $25,000 "winner-take-all challenge". Mauney was a bit slow to stay in position at the start of the ride, and he was thrown in 2 seconds by Asteroid, who scored 46 points. The 27-year-old Harris almost rode Tested, hitting the ground at 6.17 seconds. Tested was scored 45 points. At this point in his career, Shepherd Hills Tested had given up only three qualified rides in 74 attempts. Harris lasted the longest of anyone since February 2013 of those who hadn't made eight seconds. He shot out of the bucking chute fast enough for the force to push Harris back and up in his seat. Harris reported, "I just kept trying to cut the corner, hoping maybe I could beat him around there every time and I kind of got behind and he stuck me on my head...You can't be mad if you try hard and land on the back of your head. He was just better than I was. You go on from it."

After Decatur, Shepherd Hills Tested next bucked at another PBR Touring Pro event at the Stanley Park Fairgrounds in Estes Park, Colorado, in July 2014. He was the main attraction due to heavyweight Bushwacker's absence, since Bushwacker only bucked at BFTS events. Tested took an introductory lap around the arena and was bucking that night as the $1,000 bounty bull. Tested bucked off Montana Hand that evening in 2.97 seconds for a bull score of 45 points. At that same event, Shepherd Hills Tested also bucked off Cody Wood in 4.10 seconds for a bull score of 44 points. The bull finished the first half of the season with a 43.67 point average in nine BFTS outs. Tested scored 45 points or higher three consecutive times. One of which was a 45.75-point bull score bucking off Renato Nunes in 5.92 seconds at Last Cowboy Standing. He was ridden just once in 2014 by Kasey Hayes and had been ridden only two times in 38 outs in the past four years on the BFTS.

In July 2014, at a PBR event in Guymon, Oklahoma, Shepherd Hills Tested bucked off Cody Schneider in 4.32 seconds for a bull score of 45 points. In August 2014, in Castle Rock, Colorado, at a PRCA event, Shepherd Hills Tested bucked off Joseph Vazquez in 4 seconds for an exceptional bull score of 47 points. In August 2014, at a PRCA event in Caldwell, Idaho, Shepherd Hills Tested bucked off Tyler Willis in 6.13 seconds for a bull score of 40 points. In August 2014, at a PBR BFTS event in Thackerville, Oklahoma, Shepherd Hills Tested bucked off Brady Sims in 4.59 seconds for a bull score of 44.25 points. In September 2014, at a PBR BFTS event in Springfield, Missouri, Shepherd Hills Tested bucked off Tyler Harr in 4.37 seconds for a bull score of 44.50 points.

Per Cody Lambert, Shepherd Hills Tested was one of eight bulls with a serious chance at the World Champion Bull title that year. Lambert's view is that Shepherd Hills Tested "is incredibly strong and gets stronger as he goes...He is just as determined to buck guys off as Bushwacker is. He is not going to let anybody steal a ride on him. They are going to have to do everything perfect on him. If they get a little bit out of shape, they are not going to hang on to the side". Page says "Tested is going to have to bring his game and everyone else, if they want to knock Bushwacker out, they are going to have to bring their game."

Last year, he had 26 outs for both the PBR and the PRCA. He had a career high 13 BFTS buckoffs and reached a personal best average mark of 45.48 points. Shepherd Hills Tested had a total of 74 outs over the last four years at all levels.

H.D. Page planned on entering Shepherd Hills Tested in many PRCA rodeos that summer, hoping he would qualify for the NFR, as he is the defending PRCA Bucking Bull of the Year. According to Page, Shepherd Hills Tested enjoyed competing and was the kind of bull who performed better the more he worked. In the bucking chute, Tested would lick his lips. There was no hesitation or struggle. Page said. “I know people say this a lot, but he really enjoys what he does."

=== 2014 PBR World Finals ===
Shepherd Hills Tested made 11 outs in the 2014 season but had only one qualified ride, by Kasey Hayes. Hayes received a score of 91.50 points, and Tested had a buckoff percentage of 90.91 buckoff percentage. The bull had a 38-2 record for his four years on the BFTS. At the end of 2014, Shepherd Hills Tested ranked as of the top 5 bulls in the BFTS and received a second world championship nomination.

On October 27, 2014, eight world champion bull contenders were announced for the PBR BFTS World Finals that year. The top 35 bull riders in the world voted to select the contenders. The finalists were Bushwacker, Mick E. Mouse, Asteroid, Air Time, Roy, I'm a Gangster Too, Fire & Smoke, and Shepherd Hills Tested. The bull who scored the highest during the finals became the World Champion Bull. The finals took place on October 22–25, 2014, at the Thomas and Mack Center in Las Vegas, Nevada. For Tested's first out at the finals, Kasey Hayes rode Tested for a second time, but it was what the PBR considered a subpar out, with a very low score of 79.25 points and a low bull score of 42.25 points. His other out was with Lachlan Richardson, whom he bucked off in 1.10 seconds, and earned an excellent bull score of 45 points. After completion of the championship round, the winner was announced on October 26. Bushwacker was the World Champion Bull that year, making it his third and last title as it was his final year competing. Shepherd Hills Tested came in second, earning the PBR Reserve World Champion Bull title.

== Career summary ==
Shepherd Hills Tested posted a 39-3 record in his four years on the BFTS tour. He had 80 total buckoffs in all circuits. Seventeen (21.25 percent) of those were against PBR or PRCA champion bull riders. According to the ProBullStats web site, a bull riding compendium that is a sister site to the PBR, Tested has 84 attempts with 4 qualified total outs in all circuits. His buckoff percentage is 95.24 percent. On the BFTS, he has 42 attempts with 3 qualified rides. His BFTS average career score is 44.62 points. And his BFTS historic ranking is 92nd. Tested is ranked 23rd on the Top 500 Bulls by Power Rating list on ProBullStats. His career high bull score on the PBR BFTS series is 46.76 points bucking off Austin Meier in Arlington, Texas, in 1.91 seconds. His career high bull score in the PRCA is 47 points, which he scored four times, including two times at the 2012 NFR.

In statements by Cody Lambert, Shepherd Hills Tested was described as not a favorite bull of riders because "he was incredibly strong and hard to ride". He did make the same moves each out, but the first one was such a strong one that made him very difficult to ride. He had a forward motion out of the chute that he used and "he would rear them back and jerk on them really hard". But that initial move was not the only thing the rider had to overcome. "He was strong while he was turning back. If he needed to, he would spin either way. If he needed to do something different, he would try it".

Rider Austin Meier, who attempted him without success, was sorry to hear that Shepherd Hills Tested had died. He had respect for Tested. Meier said. "I remember how much power and speed he had. He had it all. Power, speed, smarts. He was an athlete." His greatest achievement was in 2013, the year he was voted PRCA Bucking Bull of the Year. He also finished as runner-up to Bushwacker twice, who was the PBR World Champion Bull that year and in 2014.

Shepherd Hills Tested bucked in his prime in a time where he was "overshadowed by the really outstanding [bulls]. Bushwacker, Asteroid and ones like that. The thing that hurt Tested was he bucked more with power and wasn’t real showy". According to Mauney, "The way he moved forward, if you weren’t on your A game and out over him, and you were behind, he was going to drill you...He wasn’t the biggest bull you ever seen, but width wise his shoulders would fill up the bucking chutes. Tested kicked hard, but he was more power".

== Honors ==
- 2012 ABBI Classic World Champion
- 2012 PRCA Bull of the National Finals Rodeo
- 2013 PBR Reserve World Champion Bull
- 2013 PRCA Bull of the Year
- 2014 PBR Reserve World Champion Bull

== Retirement, death and legacy ==
In 2014, his owners retired Shepherd Hills Tested, and he spent three years of retirement at D&H Cattle's ranch as a breeding bull. In April 2017, Shepherd Hills Tested was living at the facility of part-owner Rod Reid of Shepherd Hills Cutlery when an accident occurred. He got into a fight with another bull, and the two managed to break some fences in the process. Before anyone could get to the scene, Tested made his way off the property through one of the holes in the fence and was on a highway when he was struck by a vehicle. Approximately two weeks after being struck, Tested died on April 14, 2017, as a result of injuries incurred from the accident.

Shepherd Hills Tested's son, #A1 Mud Shark, a D&H Cattle bull, bucked his first season on the BFTS elite tour in 2017. J.B. Mauney made two qualified rides on this bull. In April 2017, in Billings, Montana, Mauney rode Mud Shark for 89.5-points in Round 3. Prior to that, in Sioux Falls, South Dakota, Mauney rode Mud Shark for 89 points.
