= Little Yellow Jacket =

American bucking bull (1996-2011)

- Little Yellow Jacket in 2003
- Breed: Brangus
- Sex: Bull
- Born: August 20, 1996; Mandan, North Dakota, U.S.
- Died: September 19, 2011 (aged 15); Graham, North Carolina, U.S.
- Nationality: United States
- Years active: 1999–2005
- Owners: Joe & Nevada Berger, Tom Teague, Bernie Taupin
- Parents: Yellow Jacket (sire); Berger Cow (dam)
- Weight: 1750 lb (790 kg)
- Appearance: Dark Red
- Awards: PBR Bull of the World Finals 2001; PBR World Champion Bull 2002, 2003, 2004

Little Yellow Jacket #P761 (August 20, 1996 – September 19, 2011) was an American bucking bull. He was a three-time PBR World Champion Bull, winning the title in consecutive years from 2002 through 2004. At the time, his three titles made him unmatched by any bull in the history of the PBR. In 2006, he was inducted into the North Dakota Cowboy Hall of Fame for his accomplishments. He was the son of #77 Yellow Jacket and the grandson of #LH600 Wrangler Rivets. Little Yellow Jacket's three-time World Champion Bull record has since been matched by Bushwacker, who received his third title in 2014, his year of retirement and Bruiser from 2016 through 2018. When Bruiser won his third title in 2018, he tied Little Yellow Jacket's record of three consecutive titles. Little Yellow Jacket was sometimes referred to as the "Michael Jordan of professional bull riding" and had his own line of merchandise. It was said he was the greatest bull in the PBR when he was selected to receive the inaugural Brand of Honor. In 2022, he was inducted into the Bull Riding Hall of Fame. In Little Yellow Jacket's day he had the largest following of any PBR bull. Later, Bushwacker was deemed to surpass Little Yellow Jacket as the best PBR bucking bull of all time.

In 2023, Little Yellow Jacket was ranked No. 6 on the list of the top 30 bulls in PBR history.

== PBR career ==
Little Yellow Jacket was bred on the Berger family ranch, named Rafter Arrow Ranch, in Mandan, North Dakota, by Joe Berger and his son Nevada. "'You can't train him to be a bucking bull,' said Berger on LJ's natural talent. 'It's about breeding and blood lines. He got it bred into him. The only thing you can train him is to not buck in the chute.'"

After Tom Teague of Tom Teague Bucking Bulls got involved with the PBR, he became interested in Little Yellow Jacket. In 2002, Teague tried to persuade owner Joe Berger to sell him a half interest in Little Yellow Jacket while in Denver, Colorado, but Berger would not do so until Little Yellow Jacket had won a World Champion Bull title. Later that year the bull won his first title and Teague approached Berger again. Berger named his price and Teague didn't even haggle, just paid it outright. Later, Englishman Bernie Taupin, a songwriter for Elton John, who has been fascinated with Western culture since childhood, managed to purchase an interest in the bull.

Little Yellow Jacket made his debut in the PBR in the year 1999 and went to his first PBR World Finals that year. Little Yellow Jacket competed in the major leagues of the PBR - the Built Ford Tough Series (BFTS) (known as the Bud Light Cup Series until 2003) starting in his first year. From the beginning to the end of his career, Little Yellow Jacket was said to either "help a rider earn a score in the elite 90s or he'd serve up a dirt sandwich". The bull seemed to know when he won. After he bucked someone off, he would seek his owner Joe Berger out for his approval. He might also show himself off to the crowd. "They'd put him in the chute and he'd go out, throw the guy off and would prance around, and it was like he was saying, 'I knew I could bust your rear,'" Tom Teague said. "But if a rider happened to ride him, he'd better look out, because Little Yellow Jacket just might try to hook him." But in the end, Little Yellow Jacket never hurt anyone. He mostly had a reputation for being a gentle bull. As a rule, he "would not only not try to come after his fallen rider, but would try to avoid and move around the grounded rider".

Early on in his career, Little Yellow Jacket earned respect from Ty Murray, a bull riding champion and a PBR co-founder, who had been described as the "King of the Cowboys" and has been referred to as the greatest cowboy of all time. At the PBR World Finals in 1999, Ty scored a 90.5 on Little Yellow Jacket. And it was Little Yellow Jacket's first time in the BFTS. "He was then was a young bull that I had no idea about," Murray said. "And when I got off of him, I told Cody Lambert, 'Wow! That bull is the real deal!" To clarify, 90+ point rides are scored only by elite riders on top bulls, so the PBR keeps special statistics for them called the "90 point club." All of Little Yellow Jacket's 14 qualified rides were scored at 90 points or higher except one.

Another of Little Yellow Jacket's common meetups was with Michael Gaffney, who described Little Yellow Jacket as "the total package." "He bucked, kicked, changed directions and had as much intensity as any bull he had seen. Gaffney said all the components made for a 'full load' when you nodded your head. There was nothing easy about his pattern in which Gaffney vividly remembers there being a hop, skip and even a hesitation (when needed) that would rock riders back on their pockets before bringing them down over his front end. And, of course, his power only compounded the difficulty." Gaffney is only one of two riders who scored two qualified rides on Little Yellow Jacket. The other is Cory McFadden.

He was successfully ridden by only 12 bull riders for 14 rides in 90 recorded tour outs on the BFTS. He has been ridden 15 times in 93 rides at all levels. He went on to become the World Champion bull three times (2002 through 2004). Cody Lambert, who was himself a bull rider when younger, said of Little Yellow Jacket at the time, "He's the greatest bull that the PBR has ever seen," He became the first bull to win three world titles and also finished runner-up to 2-time World Champion bull #81 Dillinger in 2001. Bruiser has since tied Little Yellow Jacket's record of three consecutive titles when he won his third title in 2018.

At the end of his career, Little Yellow Jacket had a buck off rate of 83.53%, with an average buck off time of 2.66 seconds. Before his death, the bull was scheduled to be the inaugural inductee in the PBR's Brand of Honor, and would have been honored in person at a ceremony at the 2011 PBR World Finals. However, Little Yellow Jacket died earlier in that year before the ceremony, which took place without him just prior to the 2011 World Finals opening.

== Historic rides ==
Michael Gaffney, Chris Shivers, and Bubba Dunn shared the record for highest marked ride in PBR history until Saturday, July 31, 2021, in Tulsa, Oklahoma, when José Vitor Leme rode Woopaa for 97.75 points, creating a new record.

=== High Marked Ride ===
Until July 31, 2021, it was the highest ride score that three men recorded a score of 96.5, doing so on four different bulls between 1999 and 2004: Bubba Dunn rode Promise Land in 1999. Chris Shivers rode Jim Jam in 2000, and Dillinger in 2001. Michael Gaffney rode Little Yellow Jacket at Nampa in 2004. After Leme's ride creating a new record, Dunn and Gaffney acknowledged his record. Shivers was not available for comment.

Going to meet him in Nampa, Idaho, both rider and bull had earned fierce reputations and world titles. Michael Gaffney had attempted Little Yellow Jacket twice before and been bucked off each time without a qualified ride. One of those times was just one week prior in Colorado Springs.

Gaffney is one of many bull riders who describe Little Yellow Jacket as one of the great bucking bulls in history. "'He had the heart of a champion', Gaffney said. 'I think, he was born that way.'...He had intensity and power and, according to Gaffney, 'he was a full load.'" He weighed between 1,700 and 1,800 pounds throughout his career.

"Nothing was in short supply for him," said Gaffney, who described Little Yellow Jacket's first move out of the chute as being a "slump jump" that included a hop, skip and a hesitation. "I had been on him several times previous to that final day, in Nampa, where I eventually got him rode," Gaffney said. "I had him the week before in Colorado Springs and he had that, like I said before, that signature move ― that step out, hop and skip and kind of rock you back on your (butt) and then just bring you down over the front end." He then explained, "I really made an effort of over extenuating my posture when I left that day, in Nampa, and that was key because once he did get in the spin he still did wind up, have the kick and the speed and the power ― that old saying is 'you get tapped off' and I was there. I pulled a foot and helped myself out. I was feeling great and gave that aggressiveness that I want to have when I was in the position I was."

"He was the ultimate bull," Gaffney said. "He had the attitude and the heart and everything else." Gaffney faced Little Yellow Jacket again later that year "in the final outing of his own career" in the eighth round of the PBR World Finals and scored 93.75 points.

=== Million Dollar Ride ===
At the World Arena in Colorado Springs in 2003, 2000 PBR World Champion Chris Shivers had a chance to ride him for $1,000,000. "A police escort accompanied the bull to the Colorado Springs Broadmoor Hotel, where he was penned in the parking lot on a bed of green, symbolizing money, and the lighting fixture above his head was a chandelier." Both rider and bull had to attend a weigh-in before the event. Shivers weighed in at 145 pounds, and Little Yellow Jacket weighed 1,600 pounds.

Shivers was bucked off in less than two seconds, and the bull's owners received $50,000. "Though Shivers took being dumped hard at the time, the legendary cowboy views the bout as a great promotion for pro bull riding". "That's probably one of the biggest moments in PBR history, and I'm just glad that I was involved in it," Shivers said. This event at the Colorado Springs Invitational was the fifth time that Little Yellow Jacket had bucked Chris Shivers off.

"He's one of the greatest bulls in the world," Shivers said after the ride. "My hat's off to him." This event reflected the ability of Little Yellow Jacket, as PBR wrote an article about the high skill level of Chris Shivers in 2013. This article spoke about Shivers being the rider who set the 90-point standard. He recorded 94 qualified rides in excess of 90 points or better. And yet, he did not score one qualified ride on Little Yellow Jacket. As of 2025, Chris Shivers still holds the record for most 90+ point rides.

== Pedigree ==
Little Yellow Jacket was a dark red Brangus bull. He weighed about 1,800 pounds (820 kg) and had one horn pointing upward and one downward. Little Yellow Jacket and his foremost ancestors are registered with American Bucking Bull, Inc. (ABBI). His sire was #77 Yellow Jacket and his dam was a Berger cow. His grandsire was #LH600 Wrangler Rivets and his grandam another Berger cow. His mother was killed in a torrid winter storm in 1997.

His sire, Yellow Jacket, was the 1999 Professional Rodeo Cowboys Association (PRCA) Bucking Bull of the Year. Yellow Jacket was owned by Big Bend/Flying 5 Rodeo at the time of his death. Both Little Yellow Jacket and his sire are listed in the top fifteen bulls in the Top 500 Bull Historical Ranking. Wrangler Rivets was a champion bucking bull who won 13 competitions as a bucking bull. Wrangler Rivets was also a two-time North American Rodeo Commission (NARC) Bull of the Year. His cousin Moody Blues was 1998 PBR World Champion Bull (the title used to be Bull of the Year).

== Retirement and death ==
Little Yellow Jacket's owners, a partnership of Joe and Nevada Berger, Bernie Taupin, and Tom Teague, retired him at the end of 2005. Little Yellow Jacket was kept in a pen when the truck/trailer would pull up to take the other bulls away for the bull riding events. He would throw a fit because he wanted to go with them. Other times he spent in the pasture so he had exercise, company, and breeding with the cows. Berger also sold his sperm for artificial insemination at $700 per straw. Little Yellow Jacket would wake up mornings in his pen and command the other bulls to come "join him for a drink of water". He was definitely the dominant bull at the ranch. Occasionally, adult visitors were guided to the ranch to view Little Yellow Jacket.

After the Bergers had kept Little Yellow Jacket at their ranch in North Dakota and had bred him for a while, Tom Teague, who owned Teague Bucking Bulls and who held a half interest, asked to buy the full interest in the bull. The Bergers honored his request, so that Little Yellow Jacket could live at Teague Bucking Bulls in North Carolina instead of North Dakota and enjoy milder winters. Joe Berger's son Chad was managing the bulls by this time. Little Yellow Jacket spent his last five years at Teague's ranch. Teague held great regard for Little Yellow Jacket and took special care of him, providing the bull superb feeds, climate control, companionship, and at the time of his death, there remained several pregnant cows. Little Yellow Jacket died in Graham, North Carolina, on September 19, 2011, at the age of 15. "Little Yellow Jacket was a tremendous athlete, and the mere mention of his name brings great memories to fans of our sport," said PBR CEO Jim Haworth. "He will certainly be remembered as one of the all-time greats." After Little Yellow Jacket's death, the home page of Teague's website became a memorial to the bull.

== Honors ==
- 2001 PBR Bull of the World Finals
- Seven trips to the PBR World Finals (1999–2005)
- Three-time PBR World Champion Bull, winning the title in consecutive years from 2002 through 2004. A vote of the top 45 bull riders.
- First bull to win "World Champion Bull" three times. First bull to do so consecutively.
- 2006 inducted into the North Dakota Cowboy Hall of Fame. First living animal to be inducted.
- 2011 received the inaugural PBR Brand of Honor.
- ProBullStats Hall of Fame
- 2022 inducted into the Bull Riding Hall of Fame in the "Bulls" category.
- 2023 was ranked No. 6 on the list of the top 30 bulls in PBR history.
- He is immortalized in a bronze statue with former bull rider and fellow three-time PBR World Champion Adriano Morães at the PBR's world headquarters in Fort Worth, Texas.
