= Pacific Bell (bull) =

American bucking bull (1981-1993)

- Pacific Bell bucking at a National Finals Rodeo
- Breed: Brangus
- Sex: Bull
- Born: 1981; Russell Ranch, Folsom, California, U.S.
- Died: 1993 (aged 11–12)
- Nationality: United States
- Years active: 1987 - 1993
- Owner: Dan Russell
- Weight: 1,750 lb (794 kg)
- Appearance: Dark Tan with a White Face
- Awards: PRCA Bucking Bull of the Year 1988, 1989, 1990

Pacific Bell #14 (April 1, 1981 – 1993) was an American bucking bull. He was the only three-time consecutive Professional Rodeo Cowboys Association (PRCA) Bucking Bull of the Year (1988 – 1990). In his career, he was successfully ridden only six times in over 150 attempts.

== Background ==
Pacific Bell was born in 1981. He was a dark tan/black color with a big white face. He was a brangus bull who weighed 1,750 pounds (790 kg) at the peak of his career. Raised and owned throughout his career by stock contractor Dan Russell, Pacific Bell was born and raised on the Russell Ranch in Folsom, California. He earned his name at age four after he began bucking and Russell noticed that "he liked to throw back his head while bucking as if he wanted to reach out and touch someone."

Russell had a significant impact in the sport of bull riding. He owned and operated Western Rodeos, Inc., which he inherited from his father. The Russell family had been involved in the cattle industry since the Civil War. The co-founders of the Professional Bull Riders (PBR) rode Russell's stock throughout the 1980s and 90s. Bullfighters for the PBR and PRCA such as Rob Smets, Shorty Gorham, and Joe Baumgartner started their careers working at events in California where Russell provided stock. Russell was particularly well-remembered for his involvement with rodeo in Salinas, California. Since 2002, he lived with his wife Linda in Henryetta, Oklahoma. Danny, his son, is also a stock contractor.

Like the undefeated PRCA bull Red Rock, undefeated PBR bull Mick E. Mouse, barely ridden PBR bull Bushwacker and other such famous bulls, Pacific Bell showed that he had no set bucking pattern. The bull would toss his head side to side and could jump extremely high. His bucking abilities made it extremely difficult for cowboys to determine what the bull was going to do and get a qualified ride from him.

== Career ==
At the age of four, Pacific Bell began to buck. As his career progressed, he became sponsored by the Skoal tobacco company, thus becoming known as Skoal Pacific Bell. He became the top bull at the 1987 National Finals Rodeo (NFR) for bucking off Rickey Lindsey and Dale Johansen. While the bull was part of the PRCA circuit, he bucked off cowboy after cowboy, including many of the best bull riders of the time. These included 1987 PRCA world champion Lane Frost, who was the only cowboy to ride 1987 Bucking Bull of the Year Red Rock (which he did after Red Rock's retirement, in the Challenge of the Champions). Then came three-time world champion and rider of "the most dangerous bull ever" Bodacious, Tuff Hedeman. Skoal Pacific Bell also bucked off "King of the Cowboys" Ty Murray.

In 1988, during the Grand National Rodeo in San Francisco, California, Skoal Pacific Bell was ridden by future PRCA world champion Cody Custer for 90 points. In Round 1 of the 1988 NFR, future world champion Jim Sharp logged an 85-point ride on Skoal Pacific Bell. It paved the way for the first of Sharp's two PRCA world championships. "He's a bull that's quick and kicks really high and spins real fast," Sharp later told reporters. "He just bucks hard. It's a combination of everything that makes him so good. He does it all." 1985 world champion Ted Nuce was awarded 83 points on him in Round 10 of that same year's NFR. David Fournier rode him for 72 points in Round 10 of the 1989 NFR. The bull bucked off 1982 PRCA world champion Charlie Sampson in the championship round of the 1990 California Rodeo Salinas. This was Sampson's third attempt to try to ride him.

Skoal Pacific Bell bucked off future PBR world champion Michael Gaffney during Round 6 of the 1991 NFR. He was then successfully ridden by future PBR world champion Troy Dunn for 91 points during Round 10 of that same year's NFR. In February 1993, the bull gave 1992 PRCA world champion Cody Custer a concussion and a laceration to his chin at Bullnanza in Guthrie, Oklahoma. At the 1993 Bull Riders Only (BRO) World Championship in Long Beach, California, he was successfully ridden in the championship round by Buddy Gulden for 81 points. This was Skoal Pacific Bell's last known professional out.

== Death and legacy ==
Skoal Pacific Bell died in late 1993. Dan Russell died on December 29, 2013 of a heart attack at age 61 in his home near Henryetta, Oklahoma. He was known for raising and owning several champion bucking bulls such as Pacific Bell, Rocky, and Grasshopper.

== Honors ==
- 1987 Top Bull of the Nationals Finals Rodeo
- 1988 PRCA Bucking Bull of the Year award decided by vote of top 30 bull riders
- 1989 PRCA Bucking Bull of the Year
- 1990 PRCA Bucking Bull of the Year
- Inducted into the ProRodeo Hall of Fame in 2007
- Inducted into the Bull Riding Hall of Fame in 2025
