= Oscar (bull) =

American bucking bull

- Breed: Brahma
- Sex: Bull
- Born: Lockeford, California, U.S.
- Died: 1983; Colorado Springs, Colorado, U.S.
- Nationality: United States
- Owner: Rodeo Stock Contractors (RSC) - Bob Cook
- Parent: Wirley Gig (sire)
- Weight: 1300 lb (590 kg)
- Appearance: Gray

Oscar #16 (d. 1983) was an American bucking bull. He competed in the Professional Rodeo Cowboys Association (PRCA) circuit. In 1979, he was one of the inaugural inductees into the ProRodeo Hall of Fame. To date, only eight bulls have been inducted, which is the highest honor a bucking bull can receive in the PRCA. The California Rodeo Salinas inducted Oscar and owners - Bob & Nancy Cook, into its hall of fame in 2013. In 2018, the Bull Riding Hall of Fame inducted Oscar. In over 300 attempts, only eight bull riders made qualified rides of the requisite eight seconds on Oscar. Eight-time world champion bull rider Don Gay made the highest-scored ride on him at the time, earning 97 points, just three points short of a perfect score. Oscar's owners retired him in 1979 as a living exhibit to the ProRodeo Hall of Fame in Colorado Springs, Colorado. He remained at the hall until his death in 1983.

== Background ==
Bob Barmby, a well-known innovator in breeding bulls and a stock contractor, bred and raised Oscar at his ranch in Lockeford, California. Barmby named Oscar after his trainer, Oscar Heard.

According to one of Rodeo Stock Contractors (RSC) original owners and Barmby's son, Oscar's sire was Wirley Gig. Wirley Gig was himself a notable bucking bull. Even while still at Barmby's ranch, Oscar had a reputation for bucking off cowboys. He was a Brahma bull who was gray in color.

Oscar was smaller in stature than most professional-level bucking bulls, weighing in at about 1,300 pounds (590 kg). He was known for his powerful left spin out of the chute when first bucking. When he was a young bull, first beginning bucking, he attempted to hook dismounted riders with his horns. Later as he matured, he passed them by.

== PRCA career ==
In 1972, Barmby sold his second rodeo string, including Oscar, to Rodeo Stock Contractors (Bob Cook, Jack Roddy, Jack Sparrowk) out of Clements, California. This was Barmby's final sale of bucking stock, prior to retiring as a stock contractor.

Oscar bucked in the PRCA for his entire career, which began with Rodeo Stock Contractors (RSC), shortly after they bought him. For the first five years that RSC bucked Oscar, over 100 bull riders tried and failed to make a qualified ride on him. To incentivize the riders, RSC offered a bronze "Oscar" to the first rider to make 8 seconds on him.

In 1973, Oscar made his debut in a documentary film due to a challenge from a Mexican charro named Elias Arriolla. The documentary was a Disney film titled The Great American Cowboy, which later went on to win an Academy Award. Arriolla was permitted to use both hands (bull riding rules specify one hand) and he only needed to stay on for five seconds instead of the normal requirement of eight seconds; nevertheless, Oscar tossed him in less than two seconds.

Finally, in 1975, John Davis succeeded in being the first bull rider to ride Oscar and win the bronze statue. Davis conquered Oscar in July 1975 at the California Rodeo Salinas. Davis also won the championship gold buckle that day. Also in 1975, Randy Mager obtained one of his two rides from Oscar at the National Finals Rodeo when he finished as the Reserve World Champion. Even after these rides, Oscar still was ridden very infrequently.

In 1977, Oscar's highest scored ride in his career came at the Grand National Rodeo in San Francisco, California, at the Cow Palace, when Don Gay rode him for 97 points, just three points short of a perfect score. The score was a record in the PRCA for any livestock ride (horse or bull) at the time. The ride also won Gay the bull riding event and the bull riding world championship that year. Gay, an eight-time World Bull Riding Champion, ultimately managed to get three qualified rides on Oscar during the bull's career. Some of the few other bull riders that got a qualified ride on Oscar include Randy Magers, Jerome Robinson, Allan Jordan, and Guy Barth. Magers and Jordan each got qualified rides twice from Oscar. There is some conflict in the accounting of qualified rides; the ProRodeo Hall of Fame counts 10 qualified rides. Ultimately, only eight qualified rides are accounted in Oscar's career in the 300+ attempts taken. In 1978, Allan Jordan, a future prominent judge for several bull riding circuits including the PRCA, Professional Bull Riders, and American Bucking Bull, Inc., won a challenge with the bull. He marked a high score of 96 on Oscar. It was not uncommon in those days for bull riders to fill in as judges and vice versa. "He was just so fast," remembers Jordan. "He was small enough that you could lose him."

== Retirement and honors ==
When RSC retired Oscar in 1979, he was sent to live at the ProRodeo Hall of Fame in Colorado Springs, Colorado, where he spent his years in retirement as a living exhibit there until his death in 1983. Oscar became a very influential sire for breeding with Barmby and for the American Bucking Bull, Inc., registry.

One of Oscar's sons, originally named Oscar II, Barmby later renamed Oscar's Velvet and branded him #34. Barmby sold Oscar's Velvet for $10,000 – a previously unheard-of price – to Christensen Brothers Rodeo Company. This sale must have occurred at some point before 1972, at which time he had liquidated his stock contracting business. When Oscar's Velvet won the PRCA Bucking Bull of the Year title in 1983, it more than paid off for the buyer. Oscar's Velvet went on to produce a line of sons that became notable bucking bulls. These included notable bucking bulls such as Whitewater; Trick or Treat; Troubadour; and Reindeer, father of the famed Bushwacker.

The ProRodeo Hall of Fame inducted Oscar in its inaugural class in 1979. The California Rodeo Salinas Hall of Fame inducted him in 2013. Oscar was inducted the same year as his then-owners, Bob and Nancy Cook, who owned RSC. Reminiscences of his career included comments from longtime rodeo announcer Wayne Brooks, who recalled, "He was about 1,400 pounds of the wildest fury you ever saw in your life. He had more life than the guys who rode him." Oscar bucked immediately out of the chute, making his already remarkable speed more challenging. "Usually when people tried to ride, they didn’t ride him for more than a jump or two," Bobbie Cook of RSC said. "He came out of the chute very quickly and kicked over his head." In 2018, Oscar was inducted into the Bull Riding Hall of Fame.
