= American Bucking Bull =

Bucking bull registry

- Abbreviation: ABBI
- Formation: 2003
- Type: Incorporated
- Legal status: Corporation
- Purpose: Bucking bull and breed registry
- Headquarters: Pueblo, Colorado, United States
- Location: 4356 Montebello Dr., Pueblo, Colorado
- Region served: United States, Canada, Brazil, and Australia
- Affiliations: Professional Bull Riders
- Website: www.americanbuckingbull.com

American Bucking Bull, Inc. (ABBI) is an organization dedicated to the registration of bucking bulls and establishing the American Bucking Bull as a documented breed of cattle. American Bucking Bull, Inc., is owned by the Professional Bull Riders (PBR) and stock contractors. The organization created a breed registry and manages the registration and certification of American Bucking Bulls. It also keeps records of other breeds of bulls, some of which died out many years ago. It is the largest organization performing these functions. It maintains a genetic DNA database, manages bucking bull pedigrees and encourages the growth of the breed. ABBI also holds competitions for bucking bulls ages two through four. It also has its own magazine, the American Bucking Bull.

== History ==
People first began to breed cattle specifically to produce bulls that were good at bucking in rodeos in the 1970s. An early pioneer was Bob Wilfong. He came from a background of ranching and rodeo. "Raising bucking stock was just kind of a deal to play with", Wilfong said. Wilfong's whole breeding program was to buy cattle and see if they could buck.

The idea of registering bucking bulls originated in 1992 with Bob Tallman and Sammy Andrews. Tallman is a fifth-generation cattleman and a ProRodeo Hall of Fame rodeo announcer. Andrews is a stock contractor who owned Bodacious, a bull infamous for his severe injuries to riders, especially Tuff Hedeman. After the incident in which Bodacious injured Hedeman and the bull's subsequent retirement, there was a significant cultural shift in the sport of bull riding. Originally, the riders were the focus of the sport, but Bodacious made bulls themselves into popular athletes; many fans knew the name of Bodacious but not that of the injured rider.

After Bodacious became so popular with fans, his popularity expanded to other bulls, such as Bushwacker, Dillinger, and Little Yellow Jacket. Stock contractors started making money from all types of activities, not just bucking them: marketing, futurities, licensing, and breeding. This shift resulted in duplicity in the breeding business: certain breeders were attempting to scam others by pretending they had young bulls who were the progeny of notable sires such as Oscar, Red Rock, and Pacific Bell, when in fact the heritage of these bulls was not as advertised; this practice resulted in distrust of pedigree claims. Andrews was sure that "a credible market" required "a way to certify bloodlines", and Tallman proposed the use of DNA parentage testing, which he used in his own breeding program. Thus, in 1994, Tallman created the Rodeo Stock Registry (RSR) as a genetic database. The intent was to allow breeders to track the pedigrees of notable bucking bulls, and thus prove parentage of offspring. When the RSR became available, breeders such as Wilfong started using it to register his bulls and manage his program. He used the RSR to calculate that he had 16 different bloodlines in his pedigrees.

"Bob Tallman literally created an industry by introducing DNA testing and organized competitions for bucking bulls," stated Randy Schmutz, general manager of United Bucking Bulls, Inc. (UBBI). "His ideas and thinking were questioned and highly criticized by many, but he stuck to it. It's because of Tallman that we have what we call the 'bucking bull breeding industry' today!"

In 1996, Tallman and a partner started Buckers, Inc., a business using DNA testing to verify a bull's parentage. Bodacious became the test case for this model: "every stock contractor in the business wanted a bull as rank [difficult to ride] as Bodacious—especially if they were certain the calf was a legitimate son." Buckers, Inc. registered and certified records of Bodacious' progeny that could be documented via semen collection. They also started collecting other top bulls' semen. By 2003, Buckers had 11,000 cattle registered. Then-CEO Randy Bernard at the PBR was so impressed that he bought out Buckers and renamed the company to American Bucking Bull, Inc. He sold 19 shares of ABBI for $25,000 each.

The first bucking bull registered by the ABBI was Bodacious, also the first bull in the Buckers, Inc., database. His ABBI registration number is 1000078. When Bodacious died in 2000, he had 23 sons who had professional "outs", meaning that they had bucked in events sanctioned by the Professional Rodeo Cowboys Association (PRCA) or the PBR. This earned him "the top spot on the all-time producing sire's list" at that time. The RSR, transferred to American Bucking Bull, Inc., becoming the heart of the organization. The DNA registry database grew from 20,000 livestock registrations to over 180,000 in a little over a decade.

At that point, in 2003, other investors were invited to buy stock in the ABBI. Thousands of dollars were invested, which the PBR matched. Then, the first ABBI Finals were held in 2004 in Las Vegas, Nevada. Growth of the ABBI increased the popularity of breeding cattle specifically for their traits as bucking stock, and organized livestock breeding exploded for both genders of cattle.

The ABBI developed futurity programs for the bulls as it grew. A futurity is an event for younger bulls where the bull is judged solely on his own performance. There is no rider. In the PBR's initial years, the most a bull could earn at any event was the $20,000 prize for being selected the World Champion Bull. Today in the ABBI, registered bulls can earn up to $500,000 in events between ages two and four. These futurity events caused the ABBI to grow at accelerated rates.

== Organizational structure ==
The American Bucking Bull organization is owned half by the Professional Bull Riders. Stock contractors own shares that comprise the other half of ownership. The organization is run by a board of directors representing all parties. Their mission is to register and promote the breed of the American Bucking Bull. The genetic DNA registry that American Bucking Bull manages is the largest registry in the world for bucking bulls. Many of the most notable bulls in modern bull riding, including Bushwacker, Black Pearl, Long John, Bruiser, and Shepherd Hills Tested are now of the American Bucking Bull breed and developed their talents via ABBI event competition.

The PBR itself was founded in 1992 as a rodeo organization that only promoted bull riding. Since then, this focus has dramatically changed the way sports broadcasting handles rodeo. As of 2018, the PBR brings in millions per year in commercial sponsorships and reaches half a billion viewers, establishing bull riding as a mainstream sport. As of 2018, the Premier Series sponsor is Monster Energy, and PBR bull riding events are featured on CBS Sports Network and CBS networks. At the PBR World Finals, riders compete for a $1 million bonus. For bulls, the ABBI World Finals Classic takes place at the PBR World Finals. There 3- to 4-year-old bulls compete to win a $250,000 prize.

Industry breeders use the ABBI registry to help bulls to retain value and prove their abilities. One example was the Rosser family, who owned the Flying U Rodeo Company. In search of DNA to document parentage, Rosser mentioned one time that a bull skeleton was dug up to recover a bone fragment. It was DNA tested and used to prove that a notable bull's calves were sired as stated, showing that the genetic data kept by the registry was of value. The registry also promotes how important the maternal side is in producing the most rank bulls. For example, the cow who produced 2009 ABBI World Champion Finals Classic Bull Black Pearl sold in 2011 for $100,000. She also produced at least three other futurity money winners.

Prior to the ABBI, the best PBR bulls earned their owners money through a stud career, simply as long as parentage verified. With the ABBI, the legitimacy provided by a breed registry boosted the price of the semen used for artificial insemination and the earnings could increase significantly from each collection of semen as offspring went on to win championships. A bull typically garners $25,000 for the World Champion Bull title. The ABBI awards about $2 million each year to its competitors, such as the winners of futurity and classic events in the age range of 2 to 4 years.

More skilled bull riders and more athletic bulls have enhanced the sport. For some bull owners and breeders, the breeding of bulls has become a full-time career. A good example of a bull that ABBI developed into a successful breeding sire is three-time world champion Bushwacker, owned by Julio Moreno. Moreno retired him after the 2014 season. Bushwacker had career earnings of $600,000; now Moreno sells his semen for $5,000 a straw.

Today, the ABBI DNA registry database contains cattle records of over 200,000 individuals, including bulls in the United States, Canada, Brazil, and Australia. The registry stores more than just pedigrees. It also stores visual descriptions, ear tag numbers, and electronic chip IDs.

== Breeding stock ==
How cattle breeding developed from the early years to the present model was illustrated by the experiences of Bill Wilfong's breeding program. His cattle occasionally produced muleys polled livestock, (cattle with no horns). "Those White Spotted Park cattle were bigger than most and had a natural come back pattern. They'd come back and fight", said Wilfong. "There was a white spotted, long eared muley with a lot of front end and a lot of kick. He loved to come back in the gate. I didn't like muleys, but he was so good I bred to him anyway." This produced the cow BW 51, whom he bred to notable sire Houdini, and produced the champion bull Voodoo Child in 2002. Slade Long, an ABBI and PBR statistician, rated Voodoo Child as one of the Memorable Bulls of the PBR as part of the Golden Children Group. Voodoo Child has a record 101 outs with only five qualified rides. Voodoo Child was also the Professional Rodeo Cowboys Association (PRCA) Bucking Bull of the Year in 2007 and 2008.

Following Wilfong was Gene Baker, a former calf roper and the owner of Homestead Genetics, based in Anson, Texas. Baker moved from breeding show cattle to breeding bucking bulls in 2002 when the RSR became available in 2002. His business also benefited from the purchase of the sire 329 Houdini in 2006 who, as stated earlier, sired the bull Voodoo Child, PRCA Bucking Bull of the Year in 2007 and 2008. Houdini's progeny brought in over $5 million in competitive earnings. Baker's company has won well over 60 futurity event championships, including three wins at the annual ABBI American Heritage futurity, and the 2010 champion PBR classic once. Baker had two bulls ranked in the top in 2011.

The ABBI mostly focuses on recording animals in the American Bucking Bull breed registry. The organization also makes a breeder's certification participation program for particularly outstanding bulls, such as the following:

- Bushwacker - 2010 ABBI Classic World Finals Champion. PBR Brand of Honor. Three-time PBR World Champion Bull in 2011 and 2013 through 2014. Newsweek states that Bushwacker is the Michael Jordan of bulls. Bushwacker has career earnings of $600,000. His owner, Julio Moreno, once rejected an offer of $800,000 for the bull. In 2014, Moreno said he valued Bushwacker at $2 million.
- Code Blue - 2009 PBR World Champion Bull. ABBI competition bull. PBR talks ABBI bull is PBR champion. Silver Valley man has reigning champ.
- Asteroid - 2012 PBR World Champion Bull. ABBI breeding advertisement. Asteroid comes out of retirement. Asteroid named to PBR top ten baddest buckers. PBR Brand of Honor.
- Air Time - "He was an ABBI World Champion prospect as a 3-year-old that had a serious back injury that kept him out for a year," Cody Lambert PBR Livestock Director said. Owned by then-Minnesota Vikings NFL defensive lineman Jared Allen, the three time PBR World Champion Bull Contender, he later sired Bill the Butcher. New York Times coverage. Air Time named to PBR's top ten baddest buckers.
- Mick E. Mouse - 2012 ABBI Classic World Finals Reserve Champion. PBR World Champion Bull Contender. Holds record for unridden at all levels. Mick E. Mouse died without ever being successfully ridden in his career.
- Bruiser - D&H Cattle Company bull. 2015 ABBI Classic World Finals Champion. ABBI Record holder winnings total. Three-time PBR World Champion Bull from 2016 through 2018. 2017 PRCA Bull of the Year. Bruiser was still, as of 2018, the first place competitor. Bruiser can make history in 2018. Sired by breed certificate bull Showtime who was a two-time PBR world finalist. Descendant of Mossy Oak Mudslinger.
- Long John - D&H Cattle Company bull. 2014 ABBI World Champion Finals Classic Bull. 2015 PBR World Champion Bull. 2016 PBR Reserve World Champion Bull, Time's 2016 Most Influential Animals #50. Sired by breed certificate bull Showtime who was a two-time PBR world finalist. Descendant of Mudslinger. Long John died at a relatively young age.
- Showtime - D&H Cattle Company bull. Two-time PBR World Finals finalist. Sire to Long John and Bruiser. Descendant of Mossy Oak Mudslinger.
- Voodoo Child - ABBI bull. 2007 and 2008 PRCA Bull of the Year. Breeding information. Voodoo passes away, his achievements in the PBR.
- Bones - PBR World Champion Bull in 2008 and 2010. PBR Brand of Honor. Bones' sire is 263 Bone Collector. His mother is a daughter of Whitewater, a well-known breeding bull. Whitewater's sire was No. 34 Oscar's Velvet, the 1983 Professional Rodeo Cowboys Association (PRCA) Bucking Bull of the Year. Oscar's Velvet is the son of Oscar, a ProRodeo Hall of Fame bucking bull. Bones is also a half-brother of Troubadour owned by Julio Moreno. Troubadour also has a breeders certificate.
- Brutus - This D&H Cattle Company bull is an ABBI bull.
- 43x Magic Train - ABBI bull. Phenom Genetics bull is top-ranked bucking bull in the PBR.
- Troubadour - 2007 ABBI Classic World Finals Champion. Another Julio Moreno bull.

Other notable ABBI bulls:

- Shepherd Hills Tested - 2012 ABBI Classic World Finals Champion. D&H Cattle Company bull. 2013 PRCA Bull of the Year
- Smooth Operator - ABBI bull. Chad Berger Bucking Bulls. Competed in 2014 ABBI Classic World Finals Champion. In 2014, Smooth Operator was one of the finalists heading to the ABBI World Finals in Las Vegas, Nevada. Smooth Operator was one of the two highest sold in auction. He sold for $125,000; this was prior to his career in the PBR. He finished in the ABBI Classic Finals in third place. Smooth Operator is still, as of 2018, a top-ten-ranked competitor. Chad Berger stock contractor, owner. In the year 2019, Smooth Operator won the PBR World Champion Bull title at the PBR World Finals. Won 2020 PBR World Champion Bull, oldest bull to win back-to-back champion in PBR at age 10.
- Mossy Oak Mudslinger - D&H Cattle Company bull. Ancestor of Showtime, Bruiser, and Long John. 2006 PBR World Champion Bull. 2017 PBR Brand of Honor bull.
- Pearl Harbor - ABBI bull. 2016 and 2017 Reserve PBR World Champion Bull. 2018 PBR Brand of Honor. Pearl Harbor was one of the greatest. Owner Chad Berger sets records. Sire Black Pearl was the 2009 ABBI Classic World Finals Champion. Black Pearl was also a Breed Certificate Participant. He died early.
- Houdini - ABBI sire. Sire to PBR 2007 and 2008 PRCA Bucking Bull of the Year Voodoo Child. The ABBI Registry recorded over 1,000 of his progeny, according to owners, the Bakers of Homestead Genetics, who owned him when he died in 2010 at 19 years old. They refer to him as the greatest sire who ever was. In 1991, 329 Houdini was born on the Rafter 7 Ranch in Oklahoma. His sire was 161 White Sports Coat, and his dam was CP cow 6. Brady Roach sold Houdini to Mitch Terrell of Anson, Texas, when he was two years old. Terrell intended to breed and buck Houdini. He said the bull was a good bucker and sire. "He just spun right outside the gate and had a lot of electricity to him," Terrell recalled. They did buck Houdini some and turned out some great calves. However, Houdini eventually ended up just being a sire and that was where he excelled. He ended up with an owner named Samford for a long stretch. Samford indicated he was always extremely pleased with Houdini's calves. "You could breed Houdini to a fence post and he'd throw something that bucks," Samford said. Eventually, Samford sold Houdini to the Bakers for record $100,000. Hurst, no longer invested in Houdini, said, "He was and still is one of the top sires ever. I have several calves coming up out of Houdini and they're all really good."

Also, in 2002, Houdini was cloned. The PBR had written a feature article about Houdini on January 28, 2013. An incredible number of bucking bulls have the letters Hou in their names, in a salute to the sire Houdini. In 2013, there were close to 155,000 bulls registered in the ABBI database. Of those, close to 2,400 were sired by Houdini. Obviously, Houdini is one of the high producing. Many of those he produced are notable bulls, especially so for Voodoo Child and Black Pearl. His sire, White Sports Coat, was also a high producer. He also produced some notable bulls such as Panhandle Slim, Rooster, and Prime Time. Houdini's dam was the double bred Plummer CP6. Attend any ABBI event, and there is almost sure to be at least one bull with Houdini genetics.

- Little Yellow Jacket - ABBI managed embryos starting with McClure number 68 were flushed through to calf number No. 94, a female. 94 was a high performing bucker at junior rodeos. Gary McClure breed her mother, No. 68 to well-known producer Whitewater Skoal, who was then flushed to champion Little Yellow Jacket. Three-time PBR World Champion Bull from 2002 through 2004. Inaugural 2011 PBR Heroes & Legends Celebration: Brand of Honor. North Dakota Cowboy Hall of Fame.

On December 14, 2009, the ABBI registry reached the 100,000th entry in its DNA database. Cody Lambert, livestock director for the PBR, noted that:

There are more good bulls out there than ever before and the ABBI is one of the main reasons for that. Before the ABBI when someone bought a calf and bucked him they could never be 100% sure of that calf's pedigree, but now every registered animal in the ABBI is backed up with DNA, so you know exactly how your animals are bred." ABBI President Brad Boyd pointed out that, "This first base of 100,000 core DNA'd animals is truly the foundation for the heritage and documented ancestry of future generations of bucking bulls and elite females to come.

In his best year at the PBR, Bushwacker netted $335,000 winnings in 2010. He retired after 2014, and he has career winnings approximated around half a million dollars. ESPN once described Bushwacker as "the baddest body in sports," and suggested that bulls like him garnered more fan appreciation than their riders. Then-CEO Jim Haworth said the bulls become "celebrity athletes." While he was an active bucking bull, Bushwacker packed the house and earned $1,000 per ride. After 2010, he "aged out" of the prime ABBI window, but continued to earn money in the PBR.

== Futurity and classic events ==
The ABBI created futurities for registered bulls from ages 1 through 2, and derby events for bulls that are 3 years old. For bulls that are 3- and 4-years old, they created classic events. The annual ABBI Futurity and the Classic World Finals are the top two events for bulls. The Classic World Finals is held at the PBR World Finals. Many of the events are held at PBR regular-season events.

== ABBI World Finals ==
The annual ABBI Classic World Finals championship for three- and four-year-old bulls was held as part of the PBR World Finals for several years. The PBR World Finals moved to the Dallas–Fort Worth metroplex in 2022 and now takes place in the spring. The ABBI World Finals, however, continue taking place in Las Vegas in the autumn; now held in conjunction with the championship events of the PBR's Challenger Series and Team Series.

ABBI World Champion Classic Bull
Year	Owner	Bull
2004	D&H Cattle Company / Shippy / Jirl Buck	13 Big Deal
2005	D&H Cattle Company	S5 Stray Kitty
2006	Don & Janelle Kish	295 God's Gift
2007	Flying U / Julio Moreno & Cindy Rosser	T-11 Troubadour
2008	D&H Cattle Company / Cliff Wiggins	10-5 Crosswired
2009	Ravenscroft / Boyd-Floyd	250 Black Pearl
2010	Julio Moreno & Richard Oliviera	13/6 Bushwacker
2011	Kent Cox / Doug Ackerman	705 Back Bender
2012	Luthy / Duckwall / D&H Cattle Company / Power River Rodeo	20U Shepherd Hills Tested
2013	Wyatt Crowder	708 The Rocker
2014	D&H Cattle Company / Buck Cattle	58X Long John
2015	D&H Cattle Company / Buck Cattle	32Y Bruiser
2016	Dakota Rodeo - Berger / Struve	2125 Wicked Stick
2017	Tommy Julian / D&H Cattle Company	20A High Test
2018	Barthold / Almand / D&H Cattle Company	561C Hocus Pocus
2019	D&H Cattle Company / Flinn	43C- Chiseled
2020	Larry Barker	124 Woopaa
2021	Tommy Julian / D&H Cattle Company	34E Juju
2022	Staci Addison / Tommy Julian / Crooked W / D&H Cattle Company	35F Cool Whip
2023	Tommy Julian / BS Cattle Company	922 Flyin' Wired
2024	Less Than 8 Cattle Company	321 King Tut
2025	Flinn / D&H Cattle Company	J39- Ransom
2026	Flinn / D&H Cattle Company	J39- Ransom

The ABBI World Finals Futurity bull is awarded yearly. Bulls that are two years old that qualify can compete. The highest score wins.

ABBI World Champion Futurity Bull
Year	Owner	Bull
2004	D&H Cattle Company / Jirl Buck	S5 Stray Kitty
2005	D&H Cattle Company	347 Crazy Train
2006	Vernon Guidry & Lyndal Hurst	106C Comet's Gold
2007	Justin McKee / Tom Teague	41/5 Deja Blu
2008	Lightning C Cattle Company / Jerry Copp	632 Copp Hou
2009	Cody Ohl / K Bar C / Scott Accomazzo	U7042 Pure Smoke
2010	Jerry Tuttle / Jayne's Gang	33-8 Ragin' JT
2011	Bobby Pillow / Barrett	112 Jungle Smoke
2012	Circle T Ranch / Pillow	54 Jungle Fear
2013	Stoltzfus Cattle Company	15 Amigo II
2014	Harrison / D&H Cattle Company	89Z Grump
2015	D&H Cattle Company	397A Frequent Flyer
2016	Top Bucking Bulls / Peggy VanCleve	423 War Cloud
2017	444 Bucking Bulls / D&H Cattle Company	4C Audacious
2018	Sara & Cord McCoy / Steve Best	612 Ridin' Solo
2019	Julian / Webb / D&H Cattle Company	705E Manaba
2020	Cord McCoy / Kevin Graber	CMc826 Little V
2021	Tommy Julian / Buck Cattle / D&H Cattle Company	956G Sucker Punch
2022	Buck Cattle / D&H Cattle Company	163H Mr. Vaquero
2023	McCoy Rodeo / Outlaw Performers	151 Sheriff
2024	Futrell / D&H Cattle Company	6K Futrell 6K
2025	Ace of Spades / McGuire / Martínez Bucking Bulls	L96 Magic Kitty
2026	Buck / Futrell / D&H Cattle Company	-406 Side Hustle

== See also ==
- Lists of rodeo performers
- Bull Riding Hall of Fame
- Professional Bull Riders
- Professional Rodeo Cowboys Association
- ProRodeo Hall of Fame
- International Professional Rodeo Association
- Women's Professional Rodeo Association
- Bull Riders Only
- Championship Bull Riding
- Canadian Professional Rodeo Association
