= California Rodeo Salinas Hall of Fame =

Hall of Fame for Cowboys

- Established: 2010
- Location: 1034 N. Main Street, Salinas, CA 93906
- Type: Hall of fame
- Website: CRSHF

The California Rodeo Salinas Hall of Fame is a cowboy hall of fame. Established in 2010 by the California Rodeo Salinas, the hall of fame recognizes and awards those individuals who helped build the rodeo and those rodeo performers who helped the rodeo become one of the top 20 professional rodeos in the United States as well as the top rodeo in California. The hall of fame divides the inductees into categories: Committee Members, Performers, Livestock, Contestants, Notables, Supporters/Contributors & Staff.

== Hall of fame members by category ==
=== Notables ===
- Pat DuVal 2023
- Lolla Galli 2010
- John W. Jones Family 2011
- Jim Rodriguez Sr. 2010
- Marguerite & Marvin Roberts 2013
- Julius G. Trescony 2016

=== Contract Personnel/Performer ===
- Joe Baumgartner 2021
- Frank V. Borba 2018
- Bob & Nancy Cook 2013
- Mel Lambert 2011
- Abe Lefton 2010
- Wilbur Plaugher 2012

=== Contestants ===
- Leo & Jerold Camarillo 2011
- Clay Carr 2016
- John Hawkins 2015
- Perry Ivory 2016
- Bill Martinelli 2021
- Harley May 2015
- David Motes 2012
- Ty Murray 2013
- Gene Rambo 2010
- Jack Roddy 2010
- Jim Rodriguez Jr. 2010
- The Santos Family 2014
- Frankie Schneider 2012
- Johnie Schneider 2012
- Jim Shoulders 2023
- Rob Smets 2014
- Casey Tibbs 2018
- Harry Tompkins 2018
- J.C. Trujillo 2018

Track Contestants

- Johnny Brazil 2011
- Harry Rose Sr. 2015
- Greg Ward 2010

=== Committee Members ===
- Chet Behen 2011
- Walt Cameron 2016
- F.E. 'Gene' Dayton 2011
- Doc Etienne 2010
- Albert Hansen, Jr. 2014
- Homer Hayward 2015
- Arthur Hebbron 2010
- EJ "Doc" Leach 2013
- Pete Pedrazzi 2012
- George Richardson 2013
- Ki Silacci 2010
- J. Michael 'Mike' Storm 2016
- Allan Wallace 2018
- Warren Wayland 2012

=== Supporters & Contributors ===
- Barbara Balentine 2021
- Garcia Saddlery 2014
- Patricia Adcock Garlinger 2010
- Gary Gist 2023
- The Happy Family 2011
- The Harden Foundation 2023
- The US Army 2014

=== Livestock ===
- Lucky Blanton 2011
- RR Le Mistral a.k.a. Mister 2012
- #16 Oscar 2013
