= Dillinger (bull) =

American bucking bull (1995–2004)

- Dillinger
- Sex: Bull
- Born: 1995
- Died: 2004 (aged 8–9)
- Nationality: United States
- Years active: 1999–2002
- Owner: Herrington Cattle Co.
- Weight: 1800 lb (820 kg)
- Appearance: Black with a White Face
- Awards: 1999 PBR Co-Bull of the World Finals; 2000, 2001 PBR World Champion Bull

Dillinger #81 (1995–2004) was an American bucking bull owned by the Herrington Cattle Company. He won the PBR World Champion Bull title in 2000 and 2001. He was bestowed the PBR Brand of Honor in 2012, the second bull to receive the honor after Little Yellow Jacket won the inaugural award in 2011. Today, he is ranked first in the ProBullStats historical ranking of bucking bulls in the sport of bull riding.

In 2023, Dillinger was ranked No. 4 on the list of the top 30 bulls in PBR history.

== Background ==
Dillinger was a black bull with a white face and underbelly and had a single, upside down, medium-sized right-side horn. He was named after infamous early 20th century American gangster John Dillinger. Although larger than most elite bulls of his era, he was well known for his speed and agility, bucking over 86% of riders in 51 career outs at all levels.

Herrington Cattle Company purchased Dillinger from stock contractor Neal Gay after he was awarded the title of 1999 Co-Bull of the PBR World Finals. Robbie Herrington was the direct owner of Dillinger throughout his lifetime. However, when Herrington worked out the deal with Neal Gay, he believes that "was the most honorable business dealing he ever had with a fellow contractor". Gay priced Dillinger fairly. He allowed Herrington and his son, Chad, to pay half up front. And Gay, which was far from usual in this business, gave them a guarantee: "If they weren't happy with him after three events they could return him and get their money back". "'Of course, we knew the day we bought him that wasn't going to happen," said Herrington.

Dillinger drew Bubba Dunn for his first ride. Out of the chute, Dillinger took two long jumps and, according to Herrington, "it looked like he went halfway across the Thomas & Mack Center before he turned back, but it just happened so quick and so strong you're like, I don't know. It was like seeing something you had never seen before. Of course, it proved out over time that it really was something we hadn't seen before."

"He's almost 2,000 pounds (910 kg), but he's just as athletic as the Blueberry Wines and some of the bulls that are about 1,100 pounds (500 kg), but he's also got the power of a Hollywood," Herrington said. "And like any person going about their work, Dillinger knows when it's time to go to work"... Around the ranch in Mont Belvieu, Texas, Herrington said Dillinger is almost like a pet. But when he gets in the chute... "That's the only time you see him get excited," Herrington said. "He gets as pumped up as any athlete. But outside the chute, he's very passive. He's the exception. He's the Tiger Woods of bulls."

== Career ==
His most notable ride came in the 2001 PBR Bud Light Cup (BLC) World Finals, when PBR World Champion Chris Shivers rode him for a score of 96.5. This score by Chris Shivers was tied for the highest score in the history of the PBR for several years. However, in November 2021, José Vitor Leme rode Woopaa for the new highest marked ride in PBR history. The ride score was 98.75, while Woopaa's bull score was 48.75.

Some of Dillinger's highest recorded scores place him in part of five of the 50 highest scores in the history of the PBR. These rides include the following: At the 2000 Tuff Hedeman Championship Challenge in Fort Worth, Texas, future two-time PBR World Champion Chris Shivers rode Dillinger for 96 points in the Mossy Oak Shootout and won $5,000; at the 2002 Tuff Hedeman Championship Challenge in Fort Worth, Texas, two-time PRCA World Champion bull rider Jim Sharp rode Dillinger for 95.5 points in the Mossy Oak Shootout and won $85,000 for that ride; 2002 PBR World Champion Ednei Caminhas drew Dillinger four times and successfully rode him all four times, with three scores of 94 or better; 95 points for Ednei Caminhas in 2001 in Columbus, Georgia; the year before, 94.5 points for Caminhas at the 2000 PBR World Finals; and last is when Corey Navarre rode him for 94.5 points at the 2001 PBR World Finals. Dillinger was a part of three of the Top 10 scores in PBR World Finals history.

In all of Dillinger's rides at all levels, he was only marked under 45 points twice. This is compared to 13 scores in which he was marked at 48 points or higher. Of the seven qualified scores, four of those were round wins. Also, there were 28 events he participated in where he was the high-marked bull of the event. And six of those seven qualified rides were scored in between 93.5 points to 96.5 points by judges. Lastly, his lone low score of 88.5 points was "impressive considering his broke his leg during the out". "That's the one thing, when you look back, that takes the wind out of you," said Herrington, referencing the injury. He added, "It's not always easy."

At the end of his career, Dillinger had a buck-off rate of 85.11 percent in events. Dillinger went out for a total of 47 Bud Light Cup Series rides. Of those 47 rides, seven were qualified rides and four of those rides were event round wins. He finished up his career with an average bull score of 46.83. He is a member of the ProBullStats Hall of Fame, and ranks first with an average mark of 46.888. According to Herrington, "When bull-riding enthusiasts— be it contractors, riders and PBR fans alike— see a bull like Dillinger they appreciate it. People gravitate toward greatness. When you talk about great bulls, from Little Yellow Jacket to Bushwacker, each has his own style."

== Career-ending injury and death ==
Dillinger was forced into retirement after "sustaining multiple fractures in his left hock that caused joint dislocation" at the 2002 Jack Daniel's Invitational Bud Light Cup Series event in Louisville, Kentucky, which occurred when his left leg was caught in the chute. The injury happened right before Ednei Caminhas' fourth career ride on him. He was on track to win his third consecutive World Champion Bull title in 2002 prior to the injury. "We say we've never had a back-to-back champion, but that is only in the human category," said PBR Founder and Livestock Director Cody Lambert.

Dillinger won two years in a row, and he was battling with Little Yellow Jacket, Blueberry Wine, and Mossy Oak Mudslinger when injury took him out of the game. He was a lot bigger than those bulls, weighing about 1,800 pounds in his prime. He had the same tools that they had with lots of speed and agility with power added in. All great athletes come in different sizes and shapes or even different species, but they all have one thing in common and that's competitive desire. Dillinger brought that on every trip.

Dillinger died in 2004 at the age of nine. It is claimed that PBR great late bull Mick E. Mouse, who finished his short career undefeated, was his grandson.

== Honors ==
- 1999 Co-Bull of the PBR World Finals with Promiseland
- Competed at 1999 PRCA National Finals Rodeo
- 2000 PBR World Champion Bull
- 2001 PBR World Champion Bull
- First back-to-back PBR World Champion Bull
- 2012 PBR Brand of Honor
- ProBullStats Hall of Fame
- Ranked First in the ProBullStats historical ranking
- 2023 ranked No. 4 on the list of the top 30 bulls in PBR history
