= North Dakota Cowboy Hall of Fame =

Hall of Fame for Cowboys

North Dakota Hall of Fame
- Established: 1995
- Location: 250 Main Street, P.O. Box 137, Medora, ND 58645-0137
- Type: Hall of fame
- Website: NDCHF

The North Dakota Cowboy Hall of Fame is a cowboy hall of fame. Established in 1995, the hall of fame endeavors to preserve and uphold the historic and modern western lifestyle throughout the state as it pertains to Native Americans, rodeo, and ranching.

== Inductees ==
Last Name	First Name	Category	Inducted
Aber	Bob	Rodeo Arena	2010
Albers	Theodore (Ted)	Pre-1940 Ranching	2003
Appledoorn	Franklin "Tex"	Modern-era Rodeo	2003
Armstrong	Dean	Modern-era Rodeo	1999
Baird	Phil	Legacy Award	2016
Baker	Paige Sr.	Modern-era Ranching	1999
Baker	Henry "Hank"	Pre-1940 Rodeo	2013
Barnhart	Leslie "Jim"	Rodeo Producer	2005
Barr Roberts	Margaret	Pre-1940 Ranching	2003
Bell	Angus W.	Pre-1940 Ranching	2012
Berger	Joe	Rodeo Arena	2016
Bird	Ben	Pre-1940 Ranching	2000
Bohnsack	Freida	Pre-1940 Ranching	2002
Breuer	Almit	Modern-era Rodeo	2007
Bruington	George	Pre-1940 Rodeo	2002
Burnstad	Christen	Pre-1940 Ranching	2015
Burr	Newton Sr.	Modern-era Rodeo	2012
Campbell	Archie	Pre-1940 Ranching	2011
Carson	Monty	Modern-era Rodeo	2016
Charging	George	Pre-1940 Rodeo	2008
Chase	Emanuel	Modern-era Rodeo	1999
Chase	Jack	Modern-era Rodeo	2006
Chase	Joe	Modern-era Rodeo	1999
Chase	Emerson	Rodeo Arena	2014
Christensen, DVM	George	Leaders of Ranching & Rodeo	2001
Christensen	Vic	Pre-1940 Ranching	1998
Christophersen	Bob	Modern-era Rodeo	2012
Clark	Elmer J.	Pre-1940 Rodeo	2001
Connolly	William	Pre-1940 Ranching	2008
Cook	Rex	Leaders of Ranching & Rodeo	2010
Cornell	Frederick Louis "Ted"	Arts & Entertainment	1999
Crowley	Matt	Pre-1940 Ranching	2010
Cullen	Pearl	Leaders of Ranching & Rodeo	2002
Dahl	Jack	Modern-era Ranching	2004
Danielson	Russ	Legacy Award	2013
Davis	Leonard	Pre-1940 Ranching	2006
de Mores	Marquis	Great Westerner	2013
Defender	George	Pre-1940 Rodeo	2001
Dvirnak	Alick	Modern-era Ranching	2008
Eck	Virginia "Ginny"	Legacy Award	2015
Ehr	Wilfred Jr. "Sonny"	Modern-era Rodeo	2001
Fenton	George	Modern-era Ranching	2009
Fernandez	Perfecto	Pre-1940 Ranching	2009
Fiske	Frank Bennett	Arts & Entertainment	2001
Follis	William J. "Bill"	Pre-1940 Ranching	2000
Fox	Angus	Modern-era Rodeo	2009
Fox	Guy	Pre-1940 Rodeo	2011
Fredericks	John Jr. "Buzz"	Modern-era Rodeo	2010
Fredericks	Pete	Modern-era Rodeo	1999
Gabbert	Alvin R.	Modern-era Rodeo	2005
Gardner	George	Rodeo Producer	2003
Gjermundson	Brad	Modern-era Rodeo	2009
Goldsberry	Harris	Modern-era Ranching	2002
Goodall	John W.	Pre-1940 Ranching	1999
Gore	Scott	Pre-1940 Rodeo	2002
Grantier	Jay	Pre-1940 Ranching	2001
Greenwood	Dale	Leaders of Ranching & Rodeo	2016
Griffin	Melvin	Pre-1940 Rodeo	2009
Gullickson	Maude	Modern-era Rodeo	2011
Hadden	William Roscoe "Bill"	Pre-1940 Rodeo	2014
Hall	Mervel	Modern-era Rodeo	2008
Hall	Edward S.	Pre-1940 Ranching	2005
Hall-Davy	Audrey	Arts & Entertainment	2016
Hamann	Bill	Leaders of Ranching & Rodeo	2004
Hansen	Douglas A.	Modern-era Rodeo	2015
Hart	Don	Cowboy Longrider	2006
Hecker (Lennick)	Joan	Modern-era Rodeo	2015
Henderson	Earl	Pre-1940 Ranching	2004
Herman	Wayne	Modern-era Rodeo	2004
Hovde	John	Cowboy Longrider	2009
Howard	Duane	Modern-era Rodeo	1998
Huidekoper	A.C.	Pre-1940 Ranching	1998
Jefferies	James P. "Jim"	Leaders of Ranching & Rodeo	2006
Jefferies	Arthur (A.N.)	Pre-1940 Ranching	2016
Johnston	Ben	Pre-1940 Rodeo	2015
Johnston	Jim	Modern-era Rodeo	2004
Johnston	Andrew	Pre-1940 Ranching	2006
Jorgenson	Dale	Modern-era Rodeo	2002
Kennedy	Angus Sr.	Pre-1940 Ranching	1998
Keogh	Brooks	Modern-era Ranching	2003
Keogh	Frank P.	Pre-1940 Ranching	1999
Krueger	Kenneth	Pre-1940 Rodeo	2016
Kubik	Frank, Jr.	Modern-era Ranching	2001
L'Amour	Louis	Arts & Entertainment	1998
Larson	Jake	Modern-era Ranching	2007
LaSotta	Alex	Pre-1940 Rodeo	2003
Leakey	John	Pre-1940 Ranching	1998
Leland	Melvin	Modern-era Ranching	2012
Link	Arthur	Great Westerner	2009
Linseth	Lynn	Modern-era Rodeo	2013
Lowman	Bill	Arts & Entertainment	2013
Luger	Raymond "Butch"	Modern-era Ranching	2005
Marshall	Frank	Pre-1940 Rodeo	2003
McCarty	Badlands Bill	Rodeo Producer	2004
McCormick	Gene	Modern-era Rodeo	2000
McLeod	Robert	Pre-1940 Rodeo	2006
Moore	Andy	Cowboy Longrider	2014
Moore	Richard	Pre-1940 Ranching	2014
Mrnak	James Earl	Modern-era Ranching	2015
Nelson	Alvin	Modern-era Rodeo	1998
Neuens	Evelyn	Legacy Award	2005
Neuens	Walt	Pre-1940 Rodeo	2004
Northrop	Earl	Leaders of Ranching & Rodeo	2001
Northrop	Bruce	Modern-era Rodeo	2011
O'Neil	Norman "Peg"	Rodeo Arena	2012
Olson	Harry	Modern-era Rodeo	2007
Olstad	Elnar	Arts & Entertainment	2004
Pelissier	Louis	Pre-1940 Rodeo	2000
Pelissier	Pete	Pre-1940 Rodeo	2012
Perry	LeRoy "Bud"	Modern-era Ranching	2013
Piehl	Walter, Sr.	Leaders of Ranching & Rodeo	2012
Pope	Stanley	Modern-era Ranching	2014
Quilliam	John F. "Johnny"	Pre-1940 Rodeo	2007
Reich	Delvin	Modern-era Rodeo	2001
Rhoades	Sam	Rodeo Producer	2007
Rindt	Robert "Cowboy Bob"	Arts & Entertainment	2010
Roosevelt	Theodore	Great Westerner	1999
Schafer	Harold	Legacy Award	2013
Schaff	Joseph	Modern-era Ranching	2016
Schnell	Ray Sr.	Great Westerner	2000
Schnell	Willard	Legacy Award	2009
Selland	Lee	Modern-era Rodeo	2010
Solberg	Olaf J. "Ole"	Modern-era Ranching	2000
Solberg	Tom	Modern-era Rodeo	2013
Stevenson	Donald	Pre-1940 Ranching	2007
Stevenson	John "J.C."	Rodeo Producer	2001
Stuber	Roger	Modern-era Ranching	2011
Sundby	Ed	Modern-era Rodeo	2016
Tallon	Cy	Arts & Entertainment	2000
Taylor	William "Bill"	Pre-1940 Ranching	2002
Tescher	Jim	Modern-era Rodeo	1998
Tescher	Tom	Modern-era Rodeo	1998
Tomac	Steve "The Senator"	Rodeo Arena	2008
Tyler	Marie	Cowboy Longrider	2011
Uhlman Kellogg	Lettie L.	Pre-1940 Ranching	2013
Voigt	Andrew	Pre-1940 Ranching	2001
Wanna	Howard	Pre-1940 Rodeo	2010
Weekes	James Frances "Jim"	Leaders of Ranching & Rodeo	2008
Weinberger	Jerry	Modern-era Rodeo	2014
Wetzstein	Frank	Rodeo Producer	2005
Wicks	Joe	Pre-1940 Rodeo	2005
Anchor Ranch		Ranch	2008
Anchors Aweigh #00		Rodeo Livestock	2012
Birdhead Ranch		Ranch	2002
Brooks Hereford Ranch		Ranch	2014
Blaisdell Rodeo Club		Special Achievement	2014
Cannonball Ranch		Ranch	1999
Dickinson	Match of Champions	Special Achievement	1999
Double Jeopardy #08		Rodeo Livestock	2010
Eaton Ranch-Towner		Ranch	2001
Eaton's Custer Trail Ranch		Ranch	2000
Fettig Brothers Rodeo		Rodeo Producer	2000
Fifty Years in the Saddle		Special Achievement	2009
Figure Four #4		Rodeo Livestock	2002
Kennedy Ranch		Ranch	2016
Killdeer Mountain Roundup Rodeo		Special Achievement	1998
Little Yellow Jacket #61		Rodeo Livestock	2006
Home on the Range	Champions Ride	Special Achievement	2000
Long X Ranch		Ranch	2004
Mandan Rodeo		Special Achievement	2006
Minot Y's Men's Rodeo		Special Achievement	2003
ND Winter Show Rodeo		Special Achievement	2011
Nelson Sunrise Ranch		Ranch	2003
Old Fitzgerald #22		Rodeo Livestock	2001
Old Shep #22		Rodeo Livestock	2000
Price Ranch		Ranch	2012
Red Pepper #v34		Rodeo Livestock	2008
Sakakawea		Great Westerner	2001
Sanish Rodeo		Special Achievement	2001
Silha	Russ	Modern-era Ranching	2010
Sitting Bull		Great Westerner	2005
Skoal's Centennial #L2		Rodeo Livestock	2014
Taylor Ranch		Ranch	2010
Tibor Brothers		Arts & Entertainment	2007
VVV Ranch	Weinreis Brothers	Ranch	2006
War Paint #18		Rodeo Livestock	2016
Whiz Bang #2		Rodeo Livestock	2004
Parker	Clarence	Great Westerner	2017
Christensen	Paul	Cowboy Longrider	2017
Birdsall	Herb	Pre-1940 Ranching	2017
Connolly	James	Modern-era Ranching	2017
Sorenson	Leo	Pre-1940 Rodeo	2017
Bonogofsky-Pickett	Brenda Lee	Modern-era Rodeo	2017
Jorgenson	Denver	Modern-era Rodeo	2017
White Earth Valley Saddle Club		Special Achievement	2017
Berger	Chad	Rodeo Arena	2018
Dahl	Dave	Pre-1970 Rodeo	2018
Reich	Jack	Leaders of Ranching & Rodeo	2018
Sandvick	Larry	Modern-era Rodeo	2018
Jorgenson	Nevada	Modern-era Rodeo	2018
Olson Ranch		Ranch	2018
Murray	Ralph	Modern-era Ranching	2018
Weekes	Steve	Pre-1940 Ranching	2018
Top Hand		Rodeo Livestock	2018
Nelson	Kaye	Legacy Award	2019
Martell	Charles Franklin	Pre-1940 Ranching	2019
Effertz	Gerald "Pat"	Modern-era Ranching	2019
Graham	Gary	Pre-1970 Rodeo	2019
Hermanson	Darrell	Modern-era Rodeo	2019
Hansen	Bob	Modern-era Rodeo	2019
Piehl, Jr.	Walter	Western Arts & Entertainment	2019
