= Australian Brangus =

Breed of cattle

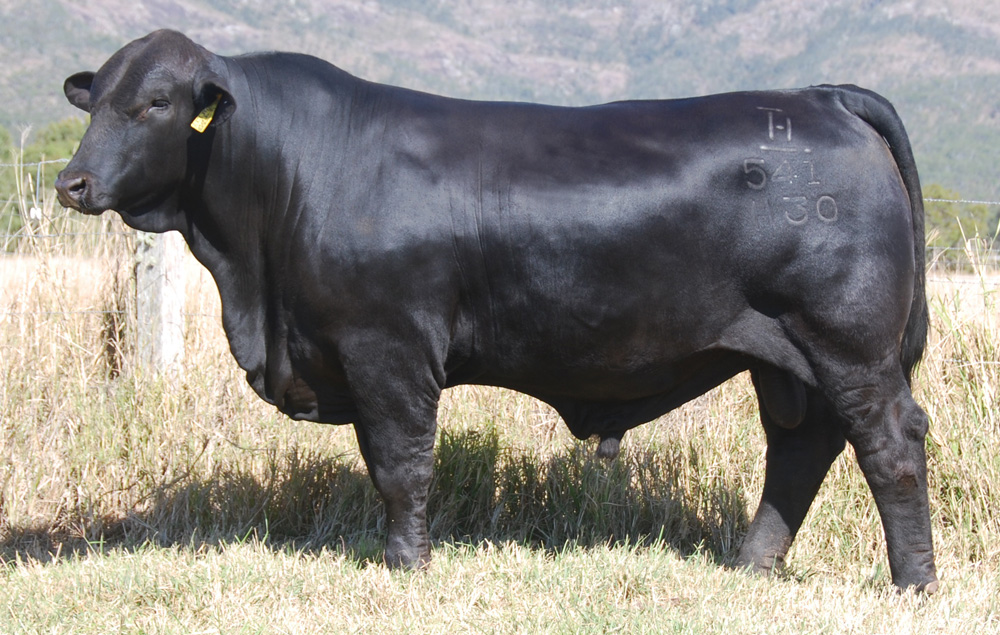
The Australian record price AU$110,000 Brangus bull, Telpara Hills Van Damme 541H30, sold in 2015

The Australian Brangus is an Australian breed of beef cattle. It is polled and is usually black. It was developed in the tropical coastal areas of Queensland through cross-breeding of Brahman and Angus cattle during the 1950s.

== History ==
The American Brangus hybrid was developed in the United States from about 1932; the Australian Brangus was developed independently in Australia in the 1950s. The breeding aim was to establish higher tick resistance and heat tolerance than that of other cattle breeds. It is widely distributed in Australia and has been exported to other countries including Japan and the United States.

== Benefits ==
The Australian Brangus cattle are about 3/8 Brahman and 5/8 Angus in their genetic makeup, however, the Brahman content can range from 25% to 75%. This allows beef producers to select cattle suitable for their local environment. The cattle are predominantly a sleek black in colour, but red Brangus are also bred. They have a low rate of eye cancer, which can be a problem in many white-faced breeds. The head is of medium length, with a broad muzzle and forehead. Australian Brangus are also good walkers and foragers and "do well" in a wide variety of situations.

The Australian Brangus Cattle Association performance records the herd using the internationally recognized Breedplan for monitoring fertility, growth, milk and carcase quality.
