= J.C. Trujillo =

American bareback bronc rider

J. C. Trujillo
- Born: James Charles Trujillo; May 10, 1948 (age 78); Prescott, Arizona, U.S.
- Education: Mesa Community College; Arizona State University
- Occupation: Bareback bronc rider
- Spouse: Margo

James Charles Trujillo (born May 10, 1948) is an American former professional rodeo cowboy who specialized in bareback bronc riding. He competed in the Professional Rodeo Cowboys Association (PRCA) circuit and was the 1981 PRCA bareback riding world champion.

== Life and career ==
Trujillo was born in Prescott, Arizona. At the age of six, he began his rodeo career.

Trujillo attended Mesa Community College and Arizona State University. In 1968, he was the intercollegiate bareback riding champion.

Trujillo joined the Rodeo Cowboys Association (RCA) in 1967. It was renamed the Professional Rodeo Cowboys Association (PRCA) in 1975. In 1981, Trujillo won the PRCA bareback riding world championship at the National Finals Rodeo (NFR). He qualified for the NFR a total of 12 times in his career. He retired in 1985.

== Personal ==
Trujillo and his wife Margo have two daughters, Annie and Sammie Lou. They also have six grandchildren.

Annie is married to former bull rider Judd Mortensen. His older brother, Brock Mortensen, is also a former bull rider. They were both active professional bull riders in the 1990s and 2000s; competing in the PRCA, BRO, and PBR circuits. Trujillo's grandsons, J.C. and Jaxton Mortensen, Judd and Annie's two eldest sons, are both active PRCA and PBR bull riders as of the 2020s. Their youngest son Juke is currently a junior bull rider.

== Honors ==
In 1994, J.C. Trujillo was inducted into the ProRodeo Hall of Fame.

In 2008, he was inducted into the California Rodeo Salinas Hall of Fame.

In 2023, he was inducted into the National Rodeo Hall of Fame of the National Cowboy & Western Heritage Museum.
