= Bucking bull =

Animal used for rodeo competition

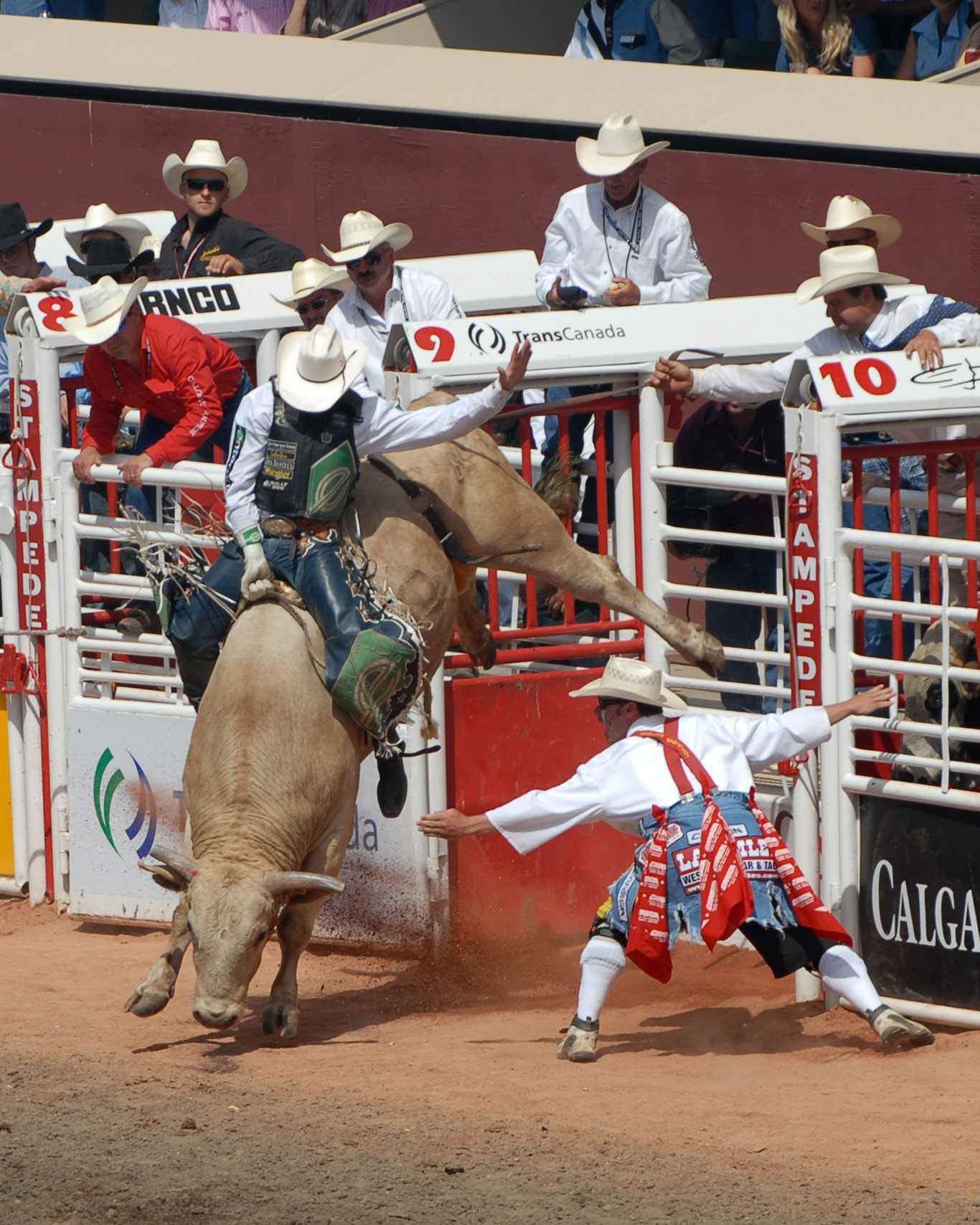
Modern-day bucking bull

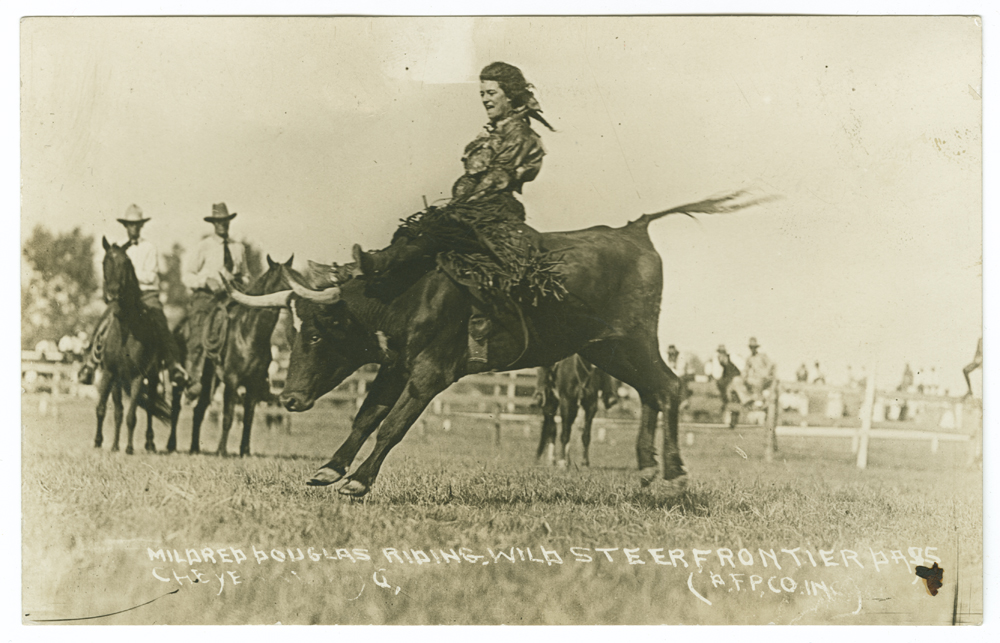
Mildred Douglas riding a bucking bull c. 1917

A bucking bull is a bull used in rodeo bull riding competition. They are usually a Brahman crossed with another breed, weighing 1,500 pounds or more, selected for their tendency to "leap, plunge and spin" when a human is on its back. In the mid-20th century, breeders began selecting bulls for bad temperament; ones that would buck when ridden. Many of the best bucking bulls trace their lineage to bulls owned by Charlie Plummer of Oklahoma. These are known as Plummer bulls.

Bucking bulls are viewed as athletes. They usually are started in their bucking career at the age of two or three, reach their athletic prime at age five or six, and if they remain healthy, can continue bucking at least until the age of 10, sometimes longer.

In some competitions between bulls, with a purse amounting to tens of thousands of dollars per event, the bulls are ridden by electronic dummies, not rodeo bull riders. Good performing bulls attain a celebrity status and can be considered a star athlete in their own right, and a valiant competitor on the field against the human rider.

The first sale of breeding cows out of champion bucking bulls was in 1999.

From a veterinary medicine perspective, bucking bulls see diagnoses that are different from regular cattle. This may be due to their role being similar to an athlete.

The percent of top professional riders staying on the bull for a full eight second "out" had dropped from 75% in the early 1990s to 35% circa 2014. This has led to criticism that the breeding has resulted in excessively aggressive and dangerous animals.

Some notable bucking bulls include Bodacious, Bruiser, Bushwacker, Chicken on a Chain, Dillinger, Little Yellow Jacket and Pacific Bell. A bull named Panhandle Slim had four clones, with identical bucking patterns, who like their sire, competed in the Professional Bull Riders circuit.

== See also ==
- American Bucking Bull
- Mechanical bull
- Stock contractor
- Rodeo clown
- Pickup rider
- Steer riding
- Bucking horse
