= Bushwacker (bull) =

American bucking bull (2006-2024)

- Breed: American Bucking Bull
- Sex: Bull
- Born: June 1, 2006; Marysville, California, U.S.
- Died: July 2, 2024 (aged 18); Springer, Oklahoma, U.S.
- Nationality: United States
- Years active: 2009–2014
- Owners: Julio Moreno, Julio Moreno Bucking Bulls
- Parents: A67 Reindeer Dippin' (sire); Lady Luck (dam)
- Weight: 1800 lb (820 kg)
- Appearance: Red with a Mottled White Face
- Awards: PBR Bull of the World Finals 2011, 2013; PBR World Champion Bull 2011, 2013, and 2014

Bushwacker #13/6 (June 1, 2006 – July 2, 2024) was an American bucking bull. He competed in the Professional Bull Riders (PBR) circuit and was a three-time PBR World Champion Bull, winning the title in 2011, 2013, and 2014. His three titles match the record established a decade earlier by Little Yellow Jacket from 2002 to 2004. He was awarded the PBR Brand of Honor in 2016. He has been referred to as the "Michael Jordan of Bulls." In 2014, PBR co-founder and Director of Livestock Cody Lambert compared Bushwacker to the likes of Secretariat and Seabiscuit. He was inducted into the Class of 2020 in the Bull Riding Hall of Fame.

In 2023, Bushwacker was ranked No. 1 on the list of the top 30 bulls in PBR history.

== Background ==
Bushwacker was sired by #A67 Reindeer Dippin' and Lady Luck. Reindeer Dippin' was born and raised in Marysville, California. He was the Bull of the Finals at the 2004 National Finals Rodeo. Reindeer Dippin's father was from Naccarato breeding on his sire's side and his mother was AN 11, an #34 Oscar's Velvet daughter. Oscar's Velvet was sired by the ProRodeo Hall of Fame bull Oscar. Lady Luck's father was Diamond's Ghost. She was raised by David Fournier and acquired by Mikel Moreno. David Fournier and Julio Moreno traded a few heifers each year at the American Bucking Bull, Inc. (ABBI) event in Weatherford, Texas – one of these was Lady Luck. "Julio told me, 'You know, Bushwacker's out of one of your cows' and when he (first) showed it to me, I knew exactly which one. "But I had gotten rid of her mother already," Fournier said.

Bushwacker was born in Marysville, California, on June 1, 2006. In 2008, as a two-year-old, he moved to Stephenville, Texas, to work with the late handler Kent Cox. Kent Cox hauled and raised many of Julio Moreno's bulls since 2005. Bushwacker was owned by Julio Moreno of Julio Moreno Bucking Bulls. After he was retired, he was used for natural breeding and had as many as 20 cows with him in the spring. Moreno maintained a Facebook page devoted to Bushwacker. The bull also had a Twitter account. Bushwacker's last public appearance was at the PBR World Finals in 2016.

Pedigree of Bushwacker, red bull w/ mottled face, 2006
Sire #A67 Reindeer Dippin' (US) born 1999 retired 2008 died 2017	Naccarato Breeding (US)		
Sire #A67 Reindeer Dippin' (US) born 1999 retired 2008 died 2017	AN #11 (US)	#34 Oscar's Velvet	Oscar (ProRodeo Hall of Fame bull)
Dam Lady Luck (US)	#780 Diamond's Ghost (US)		
Dam Lady Luck (US)	Ratjen Breeding (US)		

== Career ==
Bushwacker's notoriety was cemented during a PBR-record streak of 42 consecutive buckoffs, and 56 buckoffs in all levels of competition. It started after being ridden by Thiago Paguioto, and after that, no one would stay on him again until August 2013, when J.B. Mauney was finally successful in riding him after nine previous tries.

Bushwacker spent the majority of his career on the Built Ford Tough Series (BFTS), the major league tour of the PBR. He only bucked in the Championship rounds and the 15/15 Bucking Battles, which meant only the best riders got to try him. According to Probullstats.com, he had 87 outs with three qualified rides at all levels of competition. Of those, 66 outs and two qualified rides were on the BFTS. In October 2009, Markus Mariluch was the first to ride Bushwacker in the PBR for 88 points in Las Vegas, but this was not on the BFTS. Then, also in October 2009, Thiago Paguioto was the first to ride Bushwacker on the BFTS in Las Vegas at the PBR World Finals for 89.75 points, and then his buckoff streak started after this ride. Then in August 2013, the 42 buckoff streak was broken by J.B. Mauney on the BFTS in Tulsa, Oklahoma, for 95.25 points. The bull scored 46.75 on the ride. Bushwacker would not be ridden again. João Ricardo Vieira, who won the BFTS Iron Cowboy event title in March 2014, in Arlington, Texas, attempted to ride Bushwacker for a $1 million bounty, but was quickly bucked off. He was retired after the PBR World Finals in 2014. The record of 64 buck offs in 66 BFTS outs ranks Bushwacker eighth in all-time buckoffs to date. His career BFTS buckoff percentage is 96.969 percent. He also earned an average bull score of 46.162 points.

Throughout his six-year BFTS elite career, Bushwacker "became a world-famous superstar". During his retirement in 2014, PBR co-founder and Director of Livestock Cody Lambert compared Bushwacker with other preeminent animal athletes Secretariat and Seabiscuit. When asked what Bushwacker has meant to the PBR, Lambert took his remarks further. He immediately placed Bushwacker in an exclusive class of PBR legends, alongside others like the first and three-time world champion Adriano Moraes or two-time world champions Chris Shivers and Justin McBride.

"He is as important to the sport as any of the riders we have ever had and more famous than most of them and more well known," Lambert said. "We will have all of the great bulls from now on, and all of the great bull riders from now on, and we will never replace Bushwacker or Chris Shivers or Justin McBride or Adriano. We have fans that don't know any of the riders' names that know Bushwacker," Lambert said. "Lots of them. It's a level that no animal has taken it to so far – until Bushwacker."

== Retirement ==
Moreno retired Bushwacker from competition in October 2014 after winning his third World Champion Bull title. When the PBR awarded Bushwacker the PBR Brand of Honor, Julio brought him to "accept" the award in person in Las Vegas during the PBR World Finals in late October and early November 2016. The PBR actually built a stage for Bushwacker inside the South Point Hotel where the awards were held. This is the first time an animal has been on stage to receive an award from the PBR. J.B. Mauney attended and spoke fondly about his longtime rival.

"I hung on to him long enough for them to say I made the whistle, but in my eyes he is the greatest bucking bull there will ever be," Mauney said. "People will raise bulls their entire life and they will never have a bull like Bushwacker. It couldn't have happened to any better gentleman that I know than Julio Moreno." Mauney and Bushwacker met 13 times in Bushwacker's career. Bushwacker bucked Mauney off in all but one of those rides. The always superstitious Moreno said, "I thank J.B. J.B. was on him 13 times and Bushwacker's number is 13. It kind of worked out good like that."

== Death ==
Bushwacker spent his final years in the Springer, Oklahoma, ranch of Julio Moreno's stock contracting partner Dallas Schott, where he died on July 2, 2024, at the age of 18.

== Honors ==
- 2009 American Bucking Bull, Inc. (ABBI) Reserve Wild Card Champion
- 2010 ABBI World Champion Classic Bull & $250,000 winner
- 2011 PBR Bull of the World Finals
- 2011 High Marked Bull 9 times
- 2011 PBR World Champion Bull
- 2013 PBR Bull of the World Finals
- 2013 PBR World Champion Bull
- 2014 PBR World Champion Bull
- 2016 PBR Brand of Honor
- 2020 Bull Riding Hall of Fame
- ProBullStats Hall of Fame
- 2023 ranked No. 1 on the list of the top 30 bulls in PBR history
- Held the PBR Premier Series record of 42 consecutive buckoffs for several years; was surpassed by Cool Whip with his 43rd consecutive Premier Series buckoff at the 2024 PBR World Finals
