= Brangus =

Cattle breed

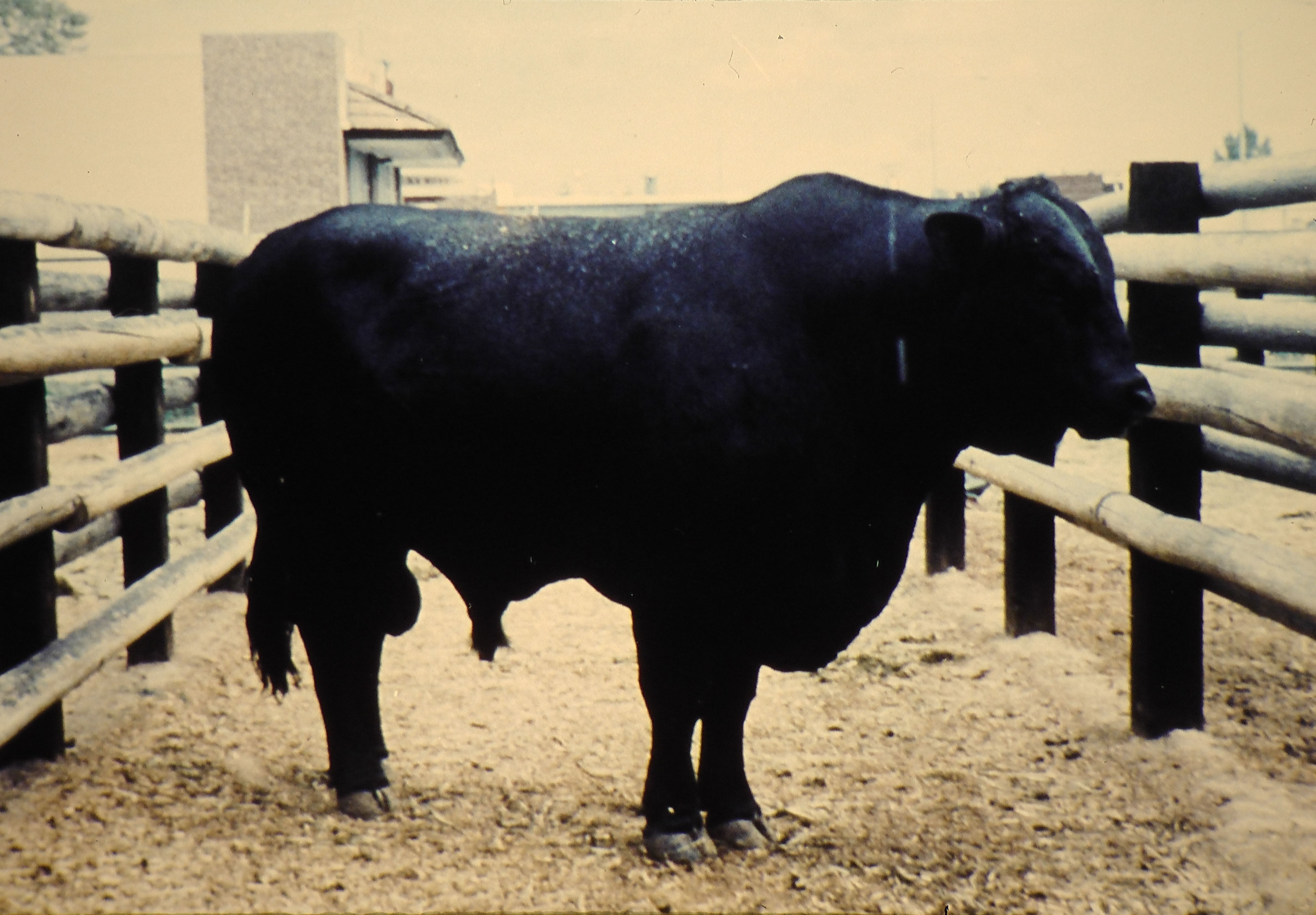
- Conservation status: FAO (2007): not at risk; DAD-IS (2023): not at risk
- Country of origin: United States
- Distribution: 26 American states
- Use: beef

Traits
- Coat: black
- Horn status: polled
- Cattle; Hybrid Bos (primigenius) taurus/indicus

The Brangus is an American hybrid breed of beef cattle derived from cross-breeding of American Angus and Brahman stock. Registered animals have 5/8 Angus and 3/8 Brahman parentage. A similar hybrid breed, the Australian Brangus, was separately developed in Australia from about 1950.

== History ==
Research into crossbreeding of Angus and Brahman stock was begun in about 1932 at the Iberia Livestock Experiment Station of the Agricultural Research Service of the United States Department of Agriculture near Jeanerette, Louisiana, where crossbreeding of Brahman and Shorthorn cattle had already shown good results. It was hoped that the good adaptation of the Brahman to hot and humid conditions could be combined with the better meat qualities of the Angus, as well as its black coat and polled characteristic. An ideal proportion of 5/8 Angus to 3/8 Brahman was established. By 1949 the cattle were distributed in sixteen American states and in Canada. A breed society, the American Brangus Breeders' Association, was formed in that year; it later became the International Brangus Breeders' Association.

In 2016 the Brangus was present in twenty-six American states. The population reported for the United States in 2010 was 42702; in 2017 it was 30000.

It has been exported to many countries, particularly in South America. It is reported (without distinction from the Australian Brangus) from twenty countries, with large populations in Brazil, Mexico and South Africa.
