= Chris Shivers =

American bull rider

Personal information
- Full name: Christopher Lee Shivers
- Nickname: Chris
- Born: December 30, 1978 (age 47) Natchez, Mississippi, U.S.
- Years active: 1997 - 2012
- Height: 5 ft 5 in (1.65 m)
- Weight: 145 lb (66 kg)

Sport
- Sport: Rodeo
- Event: Bull riding

Achievements and titles
- Highest world ranking: 2000 and 2003 PBR World Champion

Christopher Lee Shivers (born December 30, 1978) is an American former professional rodeo cowboy who specialized in bull riding, and competed in the Professional Bull Riders (PBR) circuit. He turned pro in 1997, and won the PBR World Championship in 2000 and 2003.

In 2023, Shivers was ranked No. 6 on the list of the top 30 bull riders in PBR history.

== Background ==
Chris Shivers was born on December 30, 1978, in Natchez, Mississippi.

== Career ==
Shivers has twenty-two career Bud Light Cup Series (BLC) and Built Ford Tough Series (BFTS) wins. The BLC was the name of the PBR's elite series from 1994 through 2002. The BFTS was the name from 2003 through 2017.

Shivers has recorded the following history-making firsts: the first PBR bull rider to win more than $300,000 in prize money in one year (1998); the first PBR bull rider to reach the $1 million mark (2001), the $2 million mark (2003) and the $3 million mark (2006); the first PBR bull rider to register 13 90-point rides in one season (1998); the highest marked ride in PBR history (96.5 points - twice) (a record later broken by José Vitor Leme); and the first bull rider to win three consecutive Bud Light Cup events (2000).

Shivers is the second man to win multiple PBR world titles, after Adriano Morães (1994, 2001).

Shivers rode with a cowboy hat for most of his career. However, after a wreck fractured his nose at the 2009 BFTS season opening event in Baltimore, Maryland, he rode with a helmet and face mask for the remainder of his career. He had suffered multiple head and facial injuries throughout his career, but only made a helmet a permanent part of his riding gear after this specific injury.

=== Career highlights ===
- National High School Finals Rodeo qualifier (1996)
- First PBR bull rider to register 13 90-point rides in one season (1998)
- First bull rider in PBR history to win more than $300,000 in a single season (1998)
- First PBR bull rider to earn $1 million (2001), $2 million (2003) and $3 million (2006)
- First PBR bull rider to earn $1 million World Champion bonus (2003)
- Tied PBR record high-mark ride (96.5 points in 2000 Tampa Open & 2001 PBR World Finals) (Record for highest-marked ride in PBR history later broken by José Vitor Leme with 98.75 points in 2021)
- 94 career 90-point bull rides (held the record for most 90-point rides in PBR history for several years, until José Vitor Leme scored his 95th 90-point ride in 2026)
- 22 career Bud Light Cup/Built Ford Tough Series wins
- 15-time PBR World Finals qualifier (1997–2003, 2005–2012)
- 3-time Mossy Oak Shootout winner:
  - $5,000 in Fort Worth, Texas; 2000
  - $10,000 in Billings, Montana; 2000
  - $25,000 in Reno, Nevada; 2006

=== Awards ===
- 1996 Louisiana State High School Bull Riding Champion
- 1999 Lane Frost/Brent Thurman Award (96 points on Trick or Treat)
- 2000 Copenhagen Master Pro Series Champion
- 2000 PBR Touring Pro Division Champion
- 2000 PBR 90-Point Club Champion
- 2001 Lane Frost/Brent Thurman Award (96.5 points on Dillinger)
- 2012 Lane Frost/Brent Thurman Award (90.75 points on Shepherd Hills Sod Buster)
- 2-time PBR World Champion (2000, 2003)

=== Championships ===
- 1998 PBR Marshall, Texas Touring Pro Champion
- 1998 PBR Springdale, Arkansas Touring Pro Champion
- 1998 PBR Hell on Hooves III Vancouver, British Columbia Champion
- 1998 PBR Justin Bull Riding Houston, Texas Champion
- 1998 PBR Lafayette, Louisiana Touring Pro Champion
- 1999 PBR Marshall, Texas Touring Pro Champion
- 1999 PBR San Antonio, Texas Touring Pro Champion
- 2000 PBR Weatherford, Texas Touring Pro Champion
- 2000 PBR Springdale, Arkansas Touring Pro Champion
- 2000 PBR Portland, Oregon Open Champion
- 2000 PBR Tampa, Florida Open Champion
- 2000 PBR St. Louis, Missouri Open Champion
- 2000 PBR Cleveland, Ohio Open Champion
- 2000 PBR Canadian Open Calgary, Alberta Champion
- 2000 PBR Denver, Colorado Touring Pro Division Finals Champion
- 2001 PBR St. Louis, Missouri Open Champion
- 2001 PBR NILE Invitational Billings, Montana Champion
- 2001 PBR Jackson, Mississippi Challenger Tour Champion
- 2002 PBR Alexandria, Louisiana Challenger Tour Champion
- 2003 PBR Mohegan Sun Invitational Uncasville, Connecticut Champion
- 2003 PBR Jerome Davis Challenge Greensboro, North Carolina Champion
- 2003 PBR Tampa, Florida Open Champion
- 2004 American Bucking Bull (ABBI) Bucking Bull Classic Las Vegas, Nevada Bull Riding Champion
- 2005 PBR Denver, Colorado Chute Out Champion
- 2005 PBR Southern Ford Dealers Invitational Tampa, Florida Champion
- 2005 PBR Jerome Davis Challenge Greensboro, North Carolina Champion
- 2005 PBR Grand Rapids, Michigan Invitational Champion
- 2006 PBR Charleston, South Carolina Classic Champion
- 2006 PBR Worcester, Massachusetts Classic Champion
- 2006 PBR Phoenix, Arizona Open Champion
- 2006 PBR Myron Duarte Maui, Hawaii Invitational Champion
- 2008 PBR Tacoma, Washington Classic Champion
- 2009 PBR U.S. Army Invitational Worcester, Massachusetts Champion
- 2011 PBR Des Moines, Iowa Invitational Champion
- 2012 PBR Atlanta, Georgia Invitational Champion
- 2015 PBR Unfinished Business Decatur, Texas Co-Champion

== Retirement ==
Shivers announced that the 2012 PBR season would be his last. He retired after the World Finals that year. His final earnings during his 16-year PBR career total nearly 3.3 million dollars. He was inducted into the PBR's Ring of Honor in 2013.

=== Unfinished Business ===
On May 30, 2015, Shivers came out of retirement for one more ride at "Unfinished Business" (a special event featuring several PBR legends coming out of retirement to attempt one final bull, held during the PBR's J.W. Hart Challenge at the Wise County Sheriff's Posse Arena in Decatur, Texas). There, he rode a bull named Black Cat for 88.5 points and split the event win with J.W. Hart (whose 88.5-point ride came aboard King Buck). Shivers and Hart were the only two PBR legends to ride their bulls for the full eight seconds in the event.

== Honors ==
- In 2013, Shivers was inducted into the PBR Ring of Honor.
- In 2017, he was inducted into the Bull Riding Hall of Fame.
- In 2023, he was ranked No. 6 on the list of the top 30 bull riders in PBR history.

== Personal life ==
In 2001, Shivers married his girlfriend, Kylie Morphis. They have three children. In 2019, Kylie was awarded the PBR Sharon Shoulders Award. The Shivers family resides in Jonesville in Catahoula Parish, Louisiana.
