= 2027 UTB season =

- Sport: Bull riding
- Association: Professional Bull Riders
- Series: Unleash the Beast Series
- Duration: December 11, 2026 – May 23, 2027
- TV partner: CBS Sports
- Streaming partner: Paramount+

Season champions
- World Champion: TBD

Awards
- Rookie of the Year: TBD
- Bull of the Year: TBD

2027 PBR World Finals
- Dates: May 6–9, 2027; May 20–23, 2027
- Venue: Cowtown Coliseum; Fort Worth, Texas, U.S. Desert Diamond Arena; Glendale, Arizona, U.S.
- Finals champion: TBD

Unleash the Beast Series seasons
- ← 2026

The 2027 UTB season will be the 34th season of the Professional Bull Riders (PBR) premier series and the 10th season under the Unleash the Beast Series (UTB) branding. The regular season will begin on December 11, 2025, in Manchester, New Hampshire, and conclude on April 25, 2026, in Albuquerque, New Mexico. The 2027 PBR World Finals will begin in Fort Worth, Texas, on May 6 and conclude in Glendale, Arizona, on May 23.

== Schedule ==
No.	Event	Date	Venue	Location
1	PBR Manchester	December 11–12, 2026	SNHU Arena	Manchester, New Hampshire
2	PBR Chicago	December 19–20, 2026	United Center	Chicago, Illinois
3	Ram PBR Boston	January 2–3, 2027	TD Garden	Boston, Massachusetts
4	PBR Monster Energy Buck Off at the Garden presented by Ariat	January 8–10, 2027	Madison Square Garden	New York City, New York
5	PBR Pittsburgh	February 15–16, 2027	PPG Paints Arena	Pittsburgh, Pennsylvania
6	Modo Casino PBR Tampa	January 22–23, 2027	Benchmark International Arena	Tampa, Florida
7	Ariat PBR Sacramento presented by Cooper Tires	January 29–31, 2027	Golden 1 Center	Sacramento, California
8	PBR Salt Lake City	February 5–6, 2027	Delta Center	Salt Lake City, Utah
9	Cooper Tires PBR St. Louis	February 12–13, 2027	Enterprise Center	St. Louis, Missouri
10	PBR Little Rock	February 19–20, 2027	Simmons Bank Arena	N. Little Rock, Arkansas
11	Credit One PBR Los Angeles presented by Ariat	February 26–27, 2027	Crypto.com Arena	Los Angeles, California
12	Progressive PBR Milwaukee presented by Cooper Tires	March 6–7, 2027	Fiserv Forum	Milwaukee, Wisconsin
13	PBR Indianapolis presented by Cooper Tires	March 20–21, 2027	Gainbridge Fieldhouse	Indianapolis, Indiana
14	PBR Atlanta	April 2–3, 2027	State Farm Arena	Atlanta, Georgia
15	PBR Sioux Falls	April 9–11, 2027	Denny Sanford PREMIER Center	Sioux Falls, South Dakota
16	PBR Tacoma	April 17–18, 2027	Tacoma Dome	Tacoma, Washington
17	PBR Albuquerque Ty Murray Invitational	April 23–25, 2027	The Pit	Albuquerque, New Mexico
18	PBR World Finals: Unleash the Beast	May 6–9, 2027	Cowtown Coliseum	Fort Worth, Texas
18	PBR World Finals: Unleash the Beast	May 20–23, 2027	Desert Diamond Arena	Glendale, Arizona

== Results and standings ==
=== Event results ===
No.	Event	Event winner	Aggregate	World points	Earnings	Top bull (score)
1	PBR Manchester					
2	PBR Chicago					
3	Ram PBR Boston					
4	PBR Monster Energy Buck Off at the Garden presented by Ariat					
5	PBR Pittsburgh					
6	Modo Casino PBR Tampa					
7	Ariat PBR Sacramento presented by Cooper Tires					
8	PBR Salt Lake City					
9	Cooper Tires PBR St. Louis					
10	PBR Little Rock					
11	Credit One PBR Los Angeles presented by Ariat					
12	Progressive PBR Milwaukee presented by Cooper Tires					
13	PBR Indianapolis presented by Cooper Tires					
14	PBR Atlanta					
15	PBR Sioux Falls					
16	PBR Tacoma					
17	PBR Albuquerque Ty Murray Invitational					
18	PBR World Finals: Unleash the Beast					

=== World standings ===
Color	Result
Gold	Event winner
Silver	Finished 2nd
Bronze	Finished 3rd
Green	Finished 4th–10th
Blue	Finished 11th–20th
Purple	Finished 21st or worse
Red	Did not place
Tan	Withdrew from event

T – Indicates a tie. ^{1} – Round 1 winner. ^{2} – Round 2 winner. ^{3} – Round 3 winner. ^{4} – Round 4 winner. ^{5} – Round 5 winner. ^{6} – Round 6 winner. ^{7} – Round 7 winner. ^{8} – Round 8 winner. ^{C} – Championship Round winner.

Pos.	Rider	MAN	CHI	BOS	NYC	PIT	TAM	SAC	SLC	STL	NLR	LAC	MIL	IND	ATL	SXF	TAC	ALB	GLD	Points	Earnings
1																				0.00	$0
2																				0.00	$0
3																				0.00	$0
4																				0.00	$0
5																				0.00	$0
6																				0.00	$0
7																				0.00	$0
8																				0.00	$0
9																				0.00	$0
10																				0.00	$0
11																				0.00	$0
12																				0.00	$0
13																				0.00	$0
14																				0.00	$0
15																				0.00	$0
16																				0.00	$0
17																				0.00	$0
18																				0.00	$0
19																				0.00	$0
20																				0.00	$0
21																				0.00	$0
22																				0.00	$0
23																				0.00	$0
24																				0.00	$0
25																				0.00	$0
26																				0.00	$0
27																				0.00	$0
28																				0.00	$0
29																				0.00	$0
30																				0.00	$0
31																				0.00	$0
32																				0.00	$0
33																				0.00	$0
34																				0.00	$0
36																				0.00	$0
37																				0.00	$0
38																				0.00	$0
39																				0.00	$0
40																				0.00	$0
Pos.	Rider	MAN	CHI	BOS	NYC	PIT	TAM	SAC	SLC	STL	NLR	LAC	MIL	IND	ATL	SXF	TAC	ALB	GLD	Points	Earnings

=== Bull standings ===
Pos.	Bull	WCBB	Avg.	Best	Events	B/O	Outs	Pct.
1								
2								
3								
4								
5								
6								
7								
8								
9								
10								
11								
12								
13								
14								
15								
16								
17								
18								
19								
20								
