= 2026 PBR World Finals =

- Sport: Bull riding
- Organization: Professional Bull Riders
- Series: Unleash the Beast Series
- Dates: May 7–17, 2026
- Venue: Cowtown Coliseum; Dickies Arena
- Location: Fort Worth, Texas
- Contestants: 45
- Rounds: 9
- Purse: $3,264,250

Champions
- World champion: (United States) John Crimber
- Event winner: (United States) Hudson Bolton

The 2026 PBR World Finals: Unleash the Beast was the 33rd edition of the PBR World Finals, the championship event of the Professional Bull Riders (PBR), and the conclusion of the 2026 UTB season. The event was held in Fort Worth, Texas, with opening four rounds being held from May 7 to 10 at Cowtown Coliseum, and the final five rounds being held from May 14 to 17 at Dickies Arena.

The World Finals featured the top bull riders from the 2026 UTB season competing for the PBR World Championship, a gold buckle, and a $1 million World Champion bonus. The event had a record-setting total purse of approximately $3.26 million, with the top rider of the event earning a $500,000 bonus.

John Crimber won the 2026 PBR World Championship, earning his first world title, while Hudson Bolton won the World Finals event title.

== Background ==
=== Qualification ===
The 45-rider field for the 2026 PBR World Finals consisted of the top 40 riders in the UTB world standings following the conclusion of the regular season, along with five riders who qualified through the Velocity Tour. The Velocity Tour invitees were required to record at least one qualified ride during the opening four rounds to advance to the second weekend of competition.

=== Format ===
During the opening weekend, the top 40 riders in the UTB world standings, along with five Velocity Tour invitees, competed in four rounds. Riders received scores based on their individual rides, with a qualified ride requiring the rider to remain aboard the bull for eight seconds. Riders who failed to record a qualified ride received no score for that round.

Following the first four rounds, all 40 UTB riders advanced, along with any Velocity Tour invitees who recorded a qualified ride during the first four rounds. These riders competed in the final four qualifying rounds to determine the 15 riders who would qualify for the Championship Round.

Following the final four qualifying rounds, the top 15 riders in the event standings advanced to the Championship Round. The rider with the highest aggregate score at the conclusion of the round was declared the World Finals event champion.

The World Finals also determined the PBR World Champion. Riders earned PBR points throughout the event, with the rider who accumulated the most points during the season and World Finals being crowned the PBR World Champion.

=== Venues ===
The 2026 World Finals marked the fourth consecutive year that the event was held, at least in part, in Fort Worth, Texas. The opening four rounds were held at Cowtown Coliseum, while Dickies Arena hosted the final five rounds. This also marked the third consecutive year that the opening rounds would be held at Cowtown Coliseum and the first time since 2023 that Dickies Arena hosted World Finals.

This was the final year that the World Finals were held at Dickies Arena, with the championship rounds being moved to Desert Diamond Arena in Glendale, Arizona, in 2027.

== Competition ==
=== Results ===
Note: The table lists only riders who recorded at least one qualified ride.

| Seed | Rider | Round 1 | Round 2 | Round 3 | Round 4 | Round 5 | Round 6 | Round 7 | Round 8 | Round 9 | Aggregate | Points |
|---|---|---|---|---|---|---|---|---|---|---|---|---|
| 1 | Hudson Bolton | 89.65 | 86.40 | 89.35 | 88.25 | 91.30 | 87.25 | 86.65 | — | — | 618.85 | 653.50 |
| 2 | Luciano de Castro | 88.45 | 89.25 | 87.55 | 90.15 | — | — | 87.40 | 89.05 | — | 531.85 | 470.00 |
| 3 | Paulo Eduardo Rossetto | 84.55 | — | 89.20 | 88.35 | — | 85.80 | — | — | 91.50 | 439.40 | 322.00 |
| 4 | Brady Fielder | — | — | 89.55 | — | 86.65 | 86.60 | 86.60 | — | 88.60 | 438.00 | 248.67 |
| 5 | Claudio Montanha Jr. | — | 90.90 | 89.30 | 88.70 | — | — | — | 90.05 | — | 358.95 | 226.50 |
| 6 | John Crimber | — | — | — | — | — | 89.40 | 84.95 | 91.35 | 92.90 | 358.60 | 258.00 |
| 7 | Manoelito de Souza Junior | — | — | 89.30 | — | 89.00 | — | 88.60 | 89.00 | — | 355.90 | 191.50 |
| 8 | Daylon Swearingen | 89.85 | — | — | 90.80 | — | 88.20 | 86.60 | — (Note: Swearingen did not compete in Round 8 and the Championship Round due to a fractured T9 vetebra.) | — | 355.45 | 161.67 |
| 9 | Dener Barbosa | 87.70 | 87.70 | — | 85.90 | — | — | — | — | 89.85 | 351.15 | 106.00 |
| 10 | Lucas Divino | — | 89.90 | 87.15 | 89.00 | — | 84.35 | — | — | — | 350.40 | 76.00 |
| 11 | Macaulie Leather | — | — | — | 87.40 | — | 88.55 | — | 88.60 | — | 264.55 | 60.00 |
| 12 | Keyshawn Whitehorse | 86.95 | 90.20 | — | — | — | — | 86.30 | — | — | 263.45 | 69.00 |
| 13 | Callum Miller | 90.25 | — | 83.90 | 88.30 | — | — | — | — | — | 262.45 | 62.00 |
| 14 | Bob Mitchell | — | — | — | — | 85.65 | 87.75 | 86.60 | — | — | 260.00 | 50.67 |
| 15 | Alex Cerqueira | — | — | — | — | 94.35 | 89.05 | 75.65 | — | — | 259.05 | 62.00 |
| 16 | Maverick Smith | — | — | 87.60 | — | 83.40 | 88.05 | — | — | — (Note: Smith replaced Swearingen in the Championship Round after he withdrew due to injury.) | 259.05 | 44.00 |
| 17 | Eduardo Aparecido | — | — | — | — | 96.10 | 89.55 | — | — | — | 185.65 | 88.50 |
| 18 | Sage Kimzey | 90.50 | 92.60 | — | — | — | — | — | — | — | 183.10 | 118.00 |
| 19 | Thiago Salgado | — | 90.60 | — | — | — | 90.05 | — | — | — | 180.65 | 88.00 |
| 20 | Kaiden Loud | — | — | 90.00 | 90.10 | — | — | — | — (Note: Loud did not compete in Round 8.) | — | 180.10 | 86.00 |
| 21 | Kaique Pacheco | — (Note: Pacheco was disqualified in Round 1 for failing to nod his head before the chute clock expired and received no score.) | — | — | 91.55 | — | 87.90 | — | — | — | 179.45 | 72.00 |
| 22 | Julio Cesar Marques | — | 91.10 | — | — | — | — | 87.80 | — | — | 178.90 | 65.00 |
| 23 | Daniel Keeping | — | — | 87.05 | 90.90 | — | — | — | — | — | 177.95 | 44.00 |
| 24 | Cassio Dias | — | — | — (Note: Dias did not compete in Rounds 3 and 4 due to a knee injury.) | — | 88.25 | 89.65 | — | — | — | 177.90 | 59.00 |
| 25 | Michael Lane (Note: Lane entered as an alternate in Round 5 due to an injury.) | — | — | — | — | — | 88.05 | 89.50 | — | — | 177.55 | 73.00 |
| 26 | Dalton Kasel | — | — | — | — | 87.65 | 89.55 | — | — | — | 177.20 | 52.50 |
| 27 | Mauricio Gulla Moreira | — | — | 89.50 | — | — | 87.25 | — | — | — | 176.75 | 41.50 |
| 28 | Marco Rizzo | — | — | — | 89.75 | — | 86.25 | — | — | — | 176.00 | 31.00 |
| 29 | Alan de Souza | — | — (Note: de Souza did not compete in Round 2 due to injury.) | — | — | — | — | 84.35 | 90.30 | — | 174.65 | 47.00 |
| 30 | Bruno Carvalho | — | — | — | 86.00 | 87.55 | — | — | — | — | 173.55 | 31.00 |
| 31 | Mason Taylor | — | — | 88.50 | — | — | — | — | — | — | 88.50 | 18.00 |
| 32 | Alex Junior da Silva | — | — | 88.45 | — | — | — (Note: da Silva did not compete in Round 6.) | — | — | — | 88.45 | 16.00 |
| 33 | Leandro Zampollo | — | — | — | 87.95 | — | — | — | — | — | 87.95 | 12.00 |
| 34 | Andy Guzman | — | — | 87.20 | — | — | — | — | — | — | 87.20 | 12.00 |
| 35 | Trace Redd | — | — | — | — | — | 86.40 | — | — | — | 86.40 | 8.00 |

Riders without a qualified ride

- Clay Guiton (Note: Clay Guiton did not compete after suffering a concussion and grand mal seizure during the UTB event in Salt Lake City.)
- Cort McFadden
- Jess Lockwood
- Koltin Hevalow
- Andrew Alvidrez
- José Vitor Leme (Note: José Vitor Leme did not compete due to a groin injury.)
- Felipe Furlan
- Kase Hitt
- João Ricardo Vieira
- Austin Richardson
- Kade Madsen
- Alison dos Santos
- Wyatt Rogers
- Romario Leite
- Lucas Martins Costa
- Grayson Cole
- Gustavo Luiz da Silva

=== Bull scores ===
| Seed | Rider | Round 1 | Round 2 | Round 3 | Round 4 | Round 5 | Round 6 | Round 7 | Round 8 | Round 9 | Aggregate | Points |

=== Injuries ===
| Round | Rider | Injury | Outcome | Ref. |
|---|---|---|---|---|
| 3 | Alison dos Santos | Neck injury involving the C4–C5 vertebrae | Missed Rounds 4–9 | |
| 7 | Daylon Swearingen | Fractured T9 vertebra | Missed Round 8 and the Championship Round | |

== Awards ==
| Award | Recipient | Ref. |
|---|---|---|
| PBR World Champion | (United States) John Crimber | |
| PBR World Finals Event Champion | (United States) Hudson Bolton | |
| PBR Rookie of the Year | (United States) Marco Rizzo | |
| Mason Lowe Award | (United States) Daylon Swearingen | |
| Lane Frost/Brent Thurman Award | (Brazil) Eduardo Aparecido | |
| PBR Stock Contractor of the Year | Blake Sharp | |
| YETI PBR World Champion Bull | Ransom | |
| YETI "Built for the Wild" Bull of the Finals | Ransom | |
