= 2026 UTB season =

- Sport: Bull riding
- Association: Professional Bull Riders
- Series: Unleash the Beast Series
- Duration: December 12, 2025 – May 17, 2026
- Events: 19 (Note: 18 regular season events and the 2026 PBR World Finals.)
- TV partner: CBS Sports
- Streaming partner: Paramount+

Season champions
- World Champion: John Crimber

2026 PBR World Finals
- Dates: May 7–17, 2026
- Venue: Cowtown Coliseum; Dickies Arena; Fort Worth, Texas, U.S.
- Finals champion: Hudson Bolton (1st title)

Unleash the Beast Series seasons
- ← 2025 2027 →

The 2026 UTB season was the 33rd season of the Professional Bull Riders (PBR) premier series and the ninth season under the Unleash the Beast Series (UTB) branding. The regular season began on December 12, 2025, in Manchester, New Hampshire, and concluded on April 26, 2026, in Tacoma, Washington. The 2026 PBR World Finals began in Fort Worth, Texas, on May 7 and concluded on May 17, with John Crimber being crowned the PBR World Champion.

== Rule changes ==
Beginning with the 2026 season, the PBR revised its scoring system to allow judges to award scores in increments of one-tenth of a point for both riders and bulls. Previously, scores were generally awarded in half-point increments. The change was intended to provide greater differentiation between performances at the highest level of competition. Under the revised rules, a rider's score also cannot exceed the corresponding bull score by more than three points.

== Schedule ==
The 2026 schedule consisted of 18 regular season events, including one major, followed by the 2026 PBR World Finals.

Bolded events indicate that the event is a major.

No.	Event	Date	Venue	Location
1	PBR Manchester	December 12–13, 2025	SNHU Arena	Manchester, New Hampshire
2	Modo Casino PBR Chicago	December 19–20, 2025	United Center	Chicago, Illinois
3	PBR Boston: One if by Dirt, Two if by Sea	January 2–3, 2026	TD Garden	Boston, Massachusetts
4	PBR Monster Energy Buck Off at the Garden presented by Ariat	January 9–11, 2026	Madison Square Garden	New York City, New York
5	Busch Light PBR Milwaukee presented by Cooper Tires	January 16–17, 2026	Fiserv Forum	Milwaukee, Wisconsin
6	PBR Tampa	January 23–24, 2026	Benchmark International Arena	Tampa, Florida
7	Ariat PBR Sacramento presented by Cooper Tires	January 30–February 1, 2026	Golden 1 Center	Sacramento, California
8	PBR Salt Lake City presented by Busch Light	February 6–7, 2026	Delta Center	Salt Lake City, Utah
9	U.S. Border Patrol PBR Pittsburgh presented by Ariat	February 13–14, 2026	PPG Paints Arena	Pittsburgh, Pennsylvania
10	Progressive PBR Jacksonville	February 20–21, 2026	VyStar Veterans Memorial Arena	Jacksonville, Florida
11	PBR Bridgeport	February 27–28, 2026	Total Mortgage Arena	Bridgeport, Connecticut
12	Kubota PBR Little Rock	March 6–7, 2026	Simmons Bank Arena	N. Little Rock, Arkansas
13	**PBR Florida State**	March 13–14, 2026	Doak Campbell Stadium	Tallahassee, Florida
14	PBR Indianapolis presented by Cooper Tires	March 21–22, 2026	Gainbridge Fieldhouse	Indianapolis, Indiana
15	PBR Albuquerque Ty Murray Invitational	March 27–29, 2026	The Pit	Albuquerque, New Mexico
16	First PREMIER Bank PBR Sioux Falls	April 10–12, 2026	Denny Sanford PREMIER Center	Sioux Falls, South Dakota
17	PBR Billings	April 17–18, 2026	First Interstate Arena at MetraPark	Billings, Montana
18	Cooper Tires PBR Tacoma	April 24–25, 2026	Tacoma Dome	Tacoma, Washington
19	PBR World Finals: Unleash the Beast	May 7–10, 2026	Cowtown Coliseum	Fort Worth, Texas
19	PBR World Finals: Unleash the Beast	May 14–17, 2026	Dickies Arena	Fort Worth, Texas

== Season summary ==
PBR Manchester

The 2026 season began at the PBR Manchester in Manchester, New Hampshire, where 13 riders recorded qualified rides during the opening round. Paulo Eduardo Rossetto won Round 1 with an 87.75-point ride on Dirty South, earning 28 points and the early lead in the world standings. Alex Cerqueira finished second with 86.85 points, followed by Dalton Kasel with 86.75 points.

Kasel ultimately won the event after recording an 89.50-point ride on UTZ BesTex Smokestack in the Championship Round, finishing with a three-round aggregate score of 261.60 points. Julio Cesar Marques finished second with 260.70 points after recording the event's highest score of 89.55 points in the Championship Round, while Kaiden Loud, Callum Miller, and Rossetto completed the top five. Kasel earned 128 points for the victory and took the lead in the world standings following the season-opening event.

Modo Casino PBR Chicago

The following week, the tour traveled to Chicago, Illinois, for Modo Casino PBR Chicago at the United Center. Julio Cesar Marques, Cleber Henrique Marques, and Joao Lucas Campos shared the Round 1 victory after each recorded an 86.30-point ride. Eduardo Aparecido finished fourth with 85.90 points, while Maverick Smith and Heitor Santos Ferreira tied for fifth with 85.50 points.

Marco Rizzo won the event to earn the first PBR victory of his career after going a perfect 3-for-3 and recording a 90.25-point ride on two-time PBR Bull of the Year Man Hater in the Championship Round. Rizzo finished with a 259.50-point aggregate, narrowly defeating Aparecido, who finished second with 259.25 points. Leandro Zampollo finished third after also going 3-for-3, while Paulo Eduardo Rossetto and Kaiden Loud rounded out the top five. The victory earned Rizzo 130 points and moved him to second in the world standings, six points behind series leader Dalton Kasel.

PBR Boston: One if by Dirt, Two if by Sea

The tour then traveled to Boston, Massachusetts, for PBR Boston: One if by Dirt, Two if by Sea, marking the PBR's debut at TD Garden. Daylon Swearingen won Round 1 with an 87.70-point ride on Hector, while Marco Rizzo finished second with 87.55 points and Bob Mitchell placed third with 87.20 points. Claudio Montanha Jr. and John Crimber completed the top five. The event's opening round also resulted in a tie for the lead of the world standings, as Dalton Kasel and Rizzo each held 148 points.

Brady Fielder won the event after becoming the only rider to record qualified rides in all three rounds. He clinched the victory with a 91.20-point ride on Eyes On Me in the Championship Round, finishing with a 265.15-point aggregate. Marco Rizzo finished second despite bucking off in the Championship Round, while John Crimber, Claudio Montanha Jr., and Clay Guiton completed the top five. The victory was Fielder's first of the season and moved him to second in the world standings, while Rizzo retained the overall lead after three events.

PBR Monster Energy Buck Off at the Garden presented by Ariat

The tour then stopped in New York City for the PBR Monster Energy Buck Off at the Garden presented by Ariat at Madison Square Garden. Sage Kimzey won Round 1 with a 90.60-point ride on Blue Duck, the second-highest score of the 2026 season at that point. Clay Guiton finished second with 89.10 points, while Julio Cesar Marques placed third with 88.65 points. Koltin Hevalow and Callum Miller completed the top five. Marco Rizzo retained the lead in the world standings after the round, while Brady Fielder remained second.

On the second night of competition, Leandro Zampollo won the second round for the first UTB round victory of his career, recording an 87.80-point ride on The HONDO. Callum Miller finished second with 87.70 points and took the lead in the event aggregate standings with 174.85 points, three-tenths of a point ahead of Julio Cesar Marques. Kaiden Loud recorded the third-highest score of the round with 86.50 points, while Cort McFadden and Cassio Dias rounded out the top five. Marco Rizzo remained the leader in the world standings despite failing to record a qualified ride in Round 2.

Kimzey won the event after becoming the only rider to go a perfect 4-for-4 during the season's first three-day event. He clinched the victory with a 92.05-point ride on Lights Out in the Championship Round, which was the highest score of the season at that point, finishing with a 350.80-point aggregate. Julio Cesar Marques finished second, followed by Clay Guiton, Callum Miller, and Leandro Zampollo. The victory moved Kimzey to third in the world standings, while Marques overtook Rizzo for the overall lead after earning 112 points at the event.

Busch Light PBR Milwaukee presented by Cooper Tires

The tour then traveled to Milwaukee, Wisconsin, for Busch Light PBR Milwaukee presented by Cooper Tires at Fiserv Forum. Hudson Bolton won Round 1 with an 88.65-point ride on Fast & Furious, earning the first UTB round victory of his career. John Crimber finished second with 87.80 points, followed by Marco Rizzo with 87.45 points. The round also tightened the race for the world championship, with Julio Cesar Marques retaining the lead in the standings while Rizzo and Sage Kimzey remained close behind.

Kasel won the event after going a perfect 3-for-3 and clinching the victory with a 92.35-point ride on Raging Bull in the Championship Round. He finished with a 269.30-point aggregate to earn his second event victory of the season. Julio Cesar Marques finished second, followed by Hudson Bolton, John Crimber, and Paulo Eduardo Rossetto. Kasel earned 136 points for the victory and moved within two points of Marques for the lead in the world standings.

PBR Tampa

The tour then made a stop in Tampa, Florida, for PBR Tampa at Amalie Arena. Jess Lockwood won Round 1 with an 88.70-point ride, earning his first round victory of the 2026 season. Dalton Kasel finished second and took the lead in the world standings, while Julio Cesar Marques fell from first to second in the championship race.

Lockwood won the event after going a perfect 3-for-3, earning his first premier series event victory since 2020. He clinched the victory with an 88.45-point ride on Game Changer in the Championship Round, finishing with a 259.05-point aggregate. Dalton Kasel finished second, followed by Julio Cesar Marques, Cassio Dias, and Eduardo Aparecido. The victory earned Lockwood 130 points and moved him into the top five of the world standings, while Kasel retained the overall lead.

Ariat PBR Sacramento presented by Cooper Tires

The tour then traveled to Sacramento, California, for Ariat PBR Sacramento presented by Cooper Tires at Golden 1 Center. José Vitor Leme won Round 1 with an 89.30-point ride on Reaper, earning his first round victory of the 2026 season. Leme's performance also moved him up the world standings as the season continued.

On the second night of competition, Kasel won Round 2 with a 90.65-point ride on Huckleberry, extending his lead atop the world standings. Leme finished second with 89.45 points, while Sage Kimzey placed third with 88.90 points. Kasel's victory marked his second round win of the 2026 season and further strengthened his position in the race for the World Championship.

John Crimber won the event after becoming the only rider to go a perfect 4-for-4, earning the victory with a 351.75-point aggregate. He clinched the win with a 90.75-point ride in the Championship Round, narrowly defeating Dalton Kasel, who finished second. Leme finished third, followed by Sage Kimzey and Brady Fielder. The victory was Crimber's first of the 2026 season and moved him to third in the world standings, while Kasel retained the overall lead.

PBR Salt Lake City presented by Busch Light

The tour then traveled to Salt Lake City, Utah, for PBR Salt Lake City presented by Busch Light at Delta Center. Alex Cerqueira won Round 1 with an 88.40-point ride, earning his first round victory of the 2026 season. Dalton Kasel finished second and extended his lead atop the world standings.

Paulo Eduardo Rossetto won the event after going a perfect 3-for-3, earning his second event victory of the 2026 season. He clinched the win with a 90.30-point ride in the Championship Round and finished with a 265.05-point aggregate. Alex Cerqueira finished second, followed by John Crimber, Dalton Kasel, and Julio Cesar Marques. The victory moved Rossetto up the world standings, while Crimber took the overall lead from Kasel.

During Round 2 of the event, Clay Guiton was knocked unconscious after being bucked off Lieutenant Dan and subsequently stepped on by the bull. He suffered a concussion and experienced a grand mal seizure in the arena before being transported to a hospital. CT scans found no fractures or catastrophic internal injuries, and he was discharged the following day. Guiton remained under concussion protocol and was expected to undergo further neurological evaluation before being cleared to return to competition. Guiton did not compete in any of the remaining events of the 2026 season. He was however cleared to compete in the PBR Teams Series in late July.

U.S. Border Patrol PBR Pittsburgh presented by Ariat

The tour then traveled to Pittsburgh, Pennsylvania, for the U.S. Border Patrol PBR Pittsburgh presented by Ariat at PPG Paints Arena. Cort McFadden won Round 1 after scoring a career-high 90.6-point ride on The Player, earning his first round victory of the 2026 season.

Cassio Dias won the event after going a perfect 3-for-3, earning his first premier series event victory since 2024. He secured the victory with a 91.70-point ride on Freedom Fighter in the Championship Round, finishing with a 270.30-point aggregate. Leandro Zampollo finished second, followed by Luciano De Castro, Kase Hitt, and Felipe Furlan. Dias earned 154 points for the victory and moved to seventh in the world standings, while John Crimber retained the overall lead despite failing to record a qualified ride at the event.

Progressive PBR Jacksonville

PBR Bridgeport

Kubota PBR Little Rock

PBR Florida State

PBR Indianapolis presented by Cooper Tires

PBR Albuquerque Ty Murray Invitational

First PREMIER Bank PBR Sioux Falls

PBR Billings

Cooper Tires PBR Tacoma

PBR World Finals: Unleash the Beast

== Results and standings ==
=== Event results ===
No.	Event	Event winner	Aggregate	World points	Earnings	Top bull (score)
1	PBR Manchester	(United States) Dalton Kasel	261.60	128.00	$45,990	Nasubi (44.05)
2	Modo Casino PBR Chicago	(United States) Marco Rizzo	259.50	130.00	$46,190	Man Hater (44.90)
3	PBR Boston: One if by Dirt, Two if by Sea	(Australia) Brady Fielder	265.15	135.00	$54,800	Eyes On Me (44.70)
4	PBR Monster Energy Buck Off at the Garden presented by Ariat	(United States) Sage Kimzey	350.80	182.00	$51,807	Eyes On Me (45.30)
5	Busch Light PBR Milwaukee presented by Cooper Tires	(United States) Dalton Kasel	264.75	129.00	$46,833	Magic Touch (45.75)
6	PBR Tampa	(United States) Jess Lockwood	267.65	141.00	$51,625	Ridin' Dirty (45.35)
7	Ariat PBR Sacramento presented by Cooper Tires	(United States) John Crimber	351.85	163.00	$46,833	Oyster Creek Brawler (45.35)
8	PBR Salt Lake City presented by Busch Light	(Brazil) Paulo Eduardo Rossetto	176.65	126.00	$51,025	Tigger (44.65)
9	U.S. Border Patrol PBR Pittsburgh presented by Ariat	(Brazil) Cassio Dias	270.30	154.00	$52,307	Man Hater (46.05)
10	Progressive PBR Jacksonville	(United States) Sage Kimzey	261.90	138.00	$47,940	Man Hater (45.80)
11	PBR Bridgeport	(United States) Andrew Alvidrez	258.95	119.00	$44,833	Freedom Fighter (45.05)
12	Kubota PBR Little Rock	(United States) Sage Kimzey	180.90	137.00	$51,433	Pegasus (45.75)
13	PBR Florida State	(United States) Daylon Swearingen	266.40	188.00	$87,800	Tchoupitoulas (45.00)
14	PBR Indianapolis presented by Cooper Tires	(Australia) Brady Fielder	268.75	144.00	$50,813	Cherry Shot (45.90)
15	PBR Albuquerque Ty Murray Invitational	(United States) Keyshawn Whitehorse	361.90	191.00	$53,992	Buck Nasty (46.00)
16	First PREMIER Bank PBR Sioux Falls	(United States) John Crimber	357.80	196.50	$56,633	Ransom (46.15)
17	PBR Billings	(Australia) Brady Fielder	265.95	124.00	$44,340	Ransom (47.85)
18	Cooper Tires PBR Tacoma	(United States) Daylon Swearingen	270.85	138.00	$47,290	Buck Nasty (46.10)
19	PBR World Finals: Unleash the Beast	(United States) Hudson Bolton	618.85	653.50	$552,000	Ransom (47.15)

=== World standings ===
Color	Result
Gold	Event winner
Silver	Finished 2nd
Bronze	Finished 3rd
Green	Finished 4th–10th
Blue	Finished 11th–20th
Purple	Finished 21st or worse
Red	Did not place
Tan	Withdrew from event

Bold – Indicates qualifiers for the PBR World Finals. T – Indicates a tie. ^{1} – Round 1 winner. ^{2} – Round 2 winner. ^{3} – Round 3 winner. ^{4} – Round 4 winner. ^{5} – Round 5 winner. ^{6} – Round 6 winner. ^{7} – Round 7 winner. ^{8} – Round 8 winner. ^{C} – Championship Round winner.

Pos.	Rider	MAN	CHI	BOS	NYC	MIL	TAM	SAC	SLC	PIT	JAX	BRI	NLR	TAL	IND	ALB	SXF	BIL	TAC	FTW	Points	Earnings
1	(United States) **John Crimber**	22T	—	3	14	17	13	1	2^{2}	—	7	22	3	3	13	17	1	5	10	6^{8C}	1,242.50	$1,377,907
2	(Australia) **Brady Fielder**	9	6	1^{C}	30	13T	22	—	4	12	9	14	8	11	1	4	—	1	2T	4	1,063.67	$385,701
3	(United States) **Hudson Bolton**			23	18	8^{1}	20	26	19	—					2			3	2T	1	992.50	$623,493
4	(Brazil) **Paulo Eduardo Rossetto**	5^{1}	4	7	24	—	5	—	1^{C}	—	—	12T	5	5	—	9	—	10	14	3	849.00	$302,155
5	(Brazil) **Luciano De Castro**			13	27	19	17	—	—	3	—	—	—	22	5	—	4	4	5	2	827.00	$336,950
6	(United States) **Sage Kimzey**	24	14	15	1^{1C}	—	3	7		6	1^{C}		1	17	18	—	9	16	—	18^{12}	805.00	$284,188
7	(United States) **Daylon Swearingen**			12^{1}	16	7	6	22T	13	—	—	—		1	8		7		1	8	662.17	$194,257
8	(Brazil) **Claudio Montanha Jr.**	—	8	4	19T	—	—	14	14	8	24	—	17	25	—	2	2	12	—	5	631.50	$176,149
9	(Brazil) **Leandro Zampollo**	25	3	20	5^{2}	—	19	—		2	14	2^{C}	2	20T	3	6		17		33	620.50	$126,850
10	(Brazil) **Alex Cerqueira**	6	—	27	12	3	23	17	3^{1}	9	2^{2}	10	—	13	20T	7	6	—	6	15T	603.50	$120,015
11	(United States) **Dalton Kasel**	1	22	17	—	1^{C}	4	3^{2}		—	—	19	—	23	12	12		11		26	559.00	$149,473
12	(United States) **Keyshawn Whitehorse**	13	17	8	8	15	9	21	—	—	—	25	15	7	19	1		—	—	12	474.00	$85,992
13	(Brazil) **Julio Cesar Marques**	2^{C}	12T^{1}		2	4	—	20	15	17	—	16	9	—	14	13	15	24	20	22	473.00	$109,005
14	(Brazil) **Cassio Dias**	—	21	26	21	—	—	34	—	1^{2C}	—	11	11	—	10T	—	—	7	18	24	458.50	$100,740
15	(United States) **Bob Mitchell**	10	10^{2}	9	—				—	15	3	—	20	15	17	3	14	2	17	14	457.17	$75,088
16	(United States) **Marco Rizzo**	—	1^{C}	2	28	11	24	13	—	—	8	—	10	14	4	19	18	13	11	28	453.00	$104,840
17	(United States) **Maverick Smith**	20T	15T	—	26	25	16	25	5		6	15	—	2	6	15	—	19		15T	423.00	$68,608
18	(United States) **Kaiden Loud**	3	5	—	9	20T	15	19	8	—	19T	3	—	16		16	—	—		20^{3}	422.00	$112,363
19	(United States) **Cort McFadden**				6	26	—	5	—	7^{1}	5	8T^{1}	14	6	7	21	12	18		—	414.00	$55,730
20	(United States) **Clay Guiton**	22T	—	5^{2}	3	22	2^{C}	2^{C}	10											Wth	409.50	$94,715
21	(Brazil) **Thiago Salgado**		—	6	19T	16	12	11	7	16		8T^{1}	13	20T	9	—	—		4	19^{6}	372.50	$100,940
22	(United States) **Daniel Keeping**		—	16	25	—	11^{2}	8T	16	19	—	—	—	—	—	8	3	20	7	23	322.00	$61,075
23	(Brazil) **Manoelito de Souza Junior**					10	—	4^{3}	—		23	—	—	24	—	—	—	—	—	7	303.50	$82,417
24	(United States) **Jess Lockwood**				13^{3}	9^{2}	1^{1}		—	11							10	6	—	—	292.00	$80,625
25	(Australia) **Callum Miller**	4	18		4	23	—	10	—	—	13	18	—	—	—	—		—	13	13	288.00	$51,697
26	(Brazil) **Eduardo Aparecido**	18	2	25	—	—	—	28	—	—	16	20	—	18		18	11	21	19	17^{5}	285.50	$93,915
27	(Brazil) **Kaique Pacheco**	17	19	18	10T	—	18	22T	9	20	15	4	19	—	—	10	—	—		21^{4}	267.50	$70,975
28	(United States) **Koltin Hevalow**	16	—	10	10T	2	7	—	—	13	10	24	6	—	—	—	—	—	12	—	260.50	$45,533
29	(Brazil) **Lucas Divino**	—	11	—		5	—	6	—					8	—	—	—	9	—	10	244.00	$29,050
30	(Brazil) **Alan de Souza**	7	20		—	27	10	35	6	—	18	26	4	—	—	—	17		24	29	237.00	$43,017
31	(Brazil) **Bruno Carvalho**						—	27	17	18	—	7	12	19	—	—	16	—	16	30	235.50	$12,700
32	(United States) **Andrew Alvidrez**	8^{2}	—	11	22	—	8	29	—	—	11	1	—	—	—	—			—	—	229.00	$63,633
33	(Brazil) **Dener Barbosa**															—	5	14	—	9	216.00	$36,700
34	(Brazil) **José Vitor Leme**			—	—	12	14	8T^{1}		10			18	—	—	5		8		Wth	211.50	$30,400
35	(Brazil) **Felipe Furlan**						—	—	—	5	4^{1}	—	—	4	20T	—				—	197.00	$41,697
36	(Brazil) **Mauricio Gulla Moreira**	11	—	24	15	20T	—	24	11	—	—	—	—	—	15	—	—	—	9	27	149.50	$28,100
37	(United States) **Kase Hitt**				—	—	—	32	—	4	—	17	21	12	—	11	13	—	—	—	147.00	$19,132
38	(United States) **Trace Redd**											5^{2}	—	10	—	—		22	8	35	136.00	$25,500
39	(Brazil) Afonso Quintino	15	9	—	7	18	—	15	18	—	—	12T	—	—	—	—					127.00	$11,307
40	(United States) **Kade Madsen**			28		13T	—	18	—											—	106.00	$5,650
41	(Brazil) **João Ricardo Vieira**	20T			17	—		16	—	—	21	27	—		10T	20	19	—	—	—	92.50	$9,683
42	(United States) **Andy Guzman**	—	—					12	—		—	21	—	9	—	—	—	—	—	34	90.00	$14,550
43	(United States) **Michael Lane**	—		14																25^{7}	87.00	$51,100
44	(United States) Austin Richardson			29						—	—	6	7	—	—	14					80.50	$12,875
45	(Brazil) Alex Junior da Silva		23	19							—						8	—	—		78.50	$6,775
46	(Australia) **Macaulie Leather**											—		—			—	—	15	11	70.00	$8,367
47	(Brazil) Alison dos Santos					6	—	—	—	—	19	—		—	—					—	65.00	$7,600
48	(Brazil) Cleber Henrique Marques	—	7^{1}	—	23	—	25	—	—	—											38.50	$7,933
49	(United States) **Wyatt Rogers**		—			—		33	—	—	17	—	—	—	—	—				—	36.00	$5,650
50	(United States) **Mason Taylor**				—			—			12					—	—	—	—	31	34.00	$7,050
51	(Brazil) Heitor Santos Ferreira	—	15		—				12												29.50	$3,500
52	(United States) Ezekiel Mitchell								—	14	—	—	16		—						29.00	$2,100
53	(Brazil) João Lucas Campos	—	12T^{1}																		21.00	$4,333
54	(Brazil) **Romario Leite**					24	—										—		22	—	16.00	$1,400
55	(Brazil) Lauro Nunes Vieira	26	—	—																	16.00	$950
56	(Brazil) **Lucas Martins Costa**	12	—	—																—	15.00	$2,550
57	(Brazil) Jeferson Silva	14																			12.00	$650
58	(Brazil) Everton Natan da Silva			21	—																11.00	$700
59	(United States) Jadon Hayes														16			—			11.00	$700
60	(United States) Derek Kolbaba			22	—	—	—														10.00	$1,200
61	(United States) JaCauy Hale					—	—		—			23					—				9.00	$450
62	(Brazil) Eric Henrique Domingos														—			15			9.00	$200
63	(United States) Elijah Jennings							31		—	—	—	—	—	—		—				8.00	$2,200
64	(United States) **Grayson Cole**						21	—		—									—	—	8.00	$1,200
65	(United States) Damien Krushall	19	—														—				8.00	$950
66	(Brazil) Vinicius Pinheiro Correa																	—	21		8.00	$200
67	(Brazil) Natanael Serra Aires												—					23			8.00	$200
68	(Brazil) Vinicius Rodrigues Pereira															—			23		8.00	$200
69	(Brazil) Ramon Fiorini										22								—		7.00	$200
70	(Brazil) Alvaro Ariel	27	—	—	—																0.00	$1,200
71	(United States) Mecate Trammell		—		—	—	—														0.00	$1,000
72	(Canada) Jake Gardner	—		—	—																0.00	$750
73	(Brazil) Guilherme Valleiras	—	—			—															0.00	$500
74	(Brazil) Wingson Henrique da Silva	—	—																		0.00	$500
75	(United States) Cody Jesus	—																			0.00	$250
76	(United States) Marcus Mast													—							0.00	$250
77	(United States) Dalton Rudman					—															0.00	$250
78	(United States) Zane Cook																—				0.00	$250
79	(United States) Carlos Garcia												—								0.00	$250
80	(Brazil) Caic Cassio Carvalho									—											0.00	$250
81	(United States) Cole Brewer															—					0.00	$250
82	(Brazil) João Paulo Fernandes					—															0.00	$250
83	(United States) Wyatt Vineyard							—													0.00	$250
84	(United States) Jaxton Mortensen								—												0.00	$250
85	(United States) Braidy Randolph						26														0.00	$200
86	(Brazil) Elizmar Jeremias						—				—				—						0.00	$0
87	(Brazil) Rogério Venâncio														—						0.00	$0
88	(Brazil) Jean Carlos Teodoro															—					0.00	$0
89	(Brazil) Marcelo De Souza Dias Junior																	—			0.00	$0
90	(United States) Eric Novoa					—							—						—		0.00	$0
91	(Brazil) Eikson Pereira															—					0.00	$0
92	(Brazil) **Gustavo Luiz da Silva**																			—	0.00	$0
93	(Brazil) Elzisclay dos Santos															—					0.00	$0
94	(Brazil) Bruno Roberto																	—			0.00	$0
95	(Brazil) Ednélio Rodrigues																		—		0.00	$0
96	(Australia) Qynn Andersen				—																0.00	$0
Pos.	Rider	MAN	CHI	BOS	NYC	MIL	TAM	SAC	SLC	PIT	JAX	BRI	NLR	TAL	IND	ALB	SXF	BIL	TAC	FTW	Points	Earnings

Round wins inserted up to Bridgeport

=== Bull standings ===
Pos.	Bull	WCBB	Avg.	Best	Events	B/O	Outs	Pct.
1	Ransom	45.96	45.68	47.85	11	9	13	.692
2	Pegasus	45.95	45.39	46.80	12	13	17	.765
3	Fire Zone	45.43	44.47	46.65	23	25	27	.926
4	Buck Nasty	45.40	44.76	46.30	12	16	16	1.000
5	Red Demon	45.34	43.06	46.30	9	11	12	.917
6	Man Hater (Note: Man Hater was euthanized following a high right hind leg fracture sustained during his final out at the 2026 PBR Little Rock event.)	45.28	43.06	46.30	11	7	11	.636
7	King Tut	45.27	43.08	46.70	2	3	4	.750
8	Freedom Fighter	44.85	44.41	45.55	8	12	16	.750
9	Tigger	44.79	44.45	45.50	11	7	14	.500
10	Mr. Gold	44.70	44.70	44.80	1	2	2	1.000
11	Sucker Punch	44.64	44.64	45.20	3	3	5	.600

== Monster Energy Team Challenge ==
=== Standings ===
Pos.	Team	W	L	Pct.	Behind	Score	Rides	Outs	Pct.	Earnings
1	Missouri Thunder	4	0	1.000	—	349.90	4	16	.200	$32,000
2	Austin Gamblers	3	1	.750	1.0	691.75	8	16	.333	$24,000
3	Kansas City Outlaws	3	1	.750	1.0	433.45	5	16	.238	$24,000
4	Florida Freedom	3	1	.750	1.0	431.60	5	16	.238	$24,000
5	Nashville Stampede	2	2	.500	2.0	322.60	4	16	.200	$16,000
6	Carolina Cowboys	1	3	.250	3.0	597.40	7	16	.304	$8,000
7	New York Mavericks	1	3	.250	3.0	513.15	6	16	.273	$8,000
8	Texas Rattlers	1	3	.250	3.0	484.00	6	16	.273	$8,000
9	Oklahoma Wildcatters (Note: The Oklahoma Wildcatters and Arizona Ridge Riders tied 00.00–00.00. Under the competition rules, both teams were recorded as having a loss.)	1	3	.250	3.0	409.60	5	16	.238	$10,000
10	Arizona Ridge Riders	0	4	.000	4.0	258.75	3	16	.158	$0

=== Results ===
Event	Date	Home team	Score		Away team
Regular Season
PBR Monster Energy Buck Off at the Garden presented by Ariat	January 9, 2026	Austin Gamblers	264.40	170.15	Texas Rattlers
PBR Monster Energy Buck Off at the Garden presented by Ariat	January 9, 2026	New York Mavericks	257.30	176.10	Carolina Cowboys
Busch Light PBR Milwaukee presented by Cooper Tires	January 16, 2026	Kansas City Outlaws	173.15	83.95	Oklahoma Wildcatters
Busch Light PBR Milwaukee presented by Cooper Tires	January 16, 2026	Missouri Thunder	88.10	88.05	Arizona Ridge Riders
PBR Tampa	January 23, 2026	Oklahoma Wildcatters	73.55	86.75	Missouri Thunder
PBR Tampa	January 23, 2026	Florida Freedom	88.80	153.60	Texas Rattlers
Ariat PBR Sacramento presented by Cooper Tires	January 30, 2026	Nashville Stampede	155.45	88.00	New York Mavericks
Ariat PBR Sacramento presented by Cooper Tires	January 30, 2026	Austin Gamblers	256.90	173.90	Carolina Cowboys
PBR Salt Lake City presented by Busch Light	February 6, 2026	Missouri Thunder	87.75	00.00	Kansas City Outlaws
PBR Salt Lake City presented by Busch Light	February 6, 2026	Oklahoma Wildcatters	00.00	00.00	Arizona Ridge Riders
U.S. Border Patrol PBR Pittsburgh presented by Ariat	February 13, 2026	Nashville Stampede	00.00	86.65	Florida Freedom
U.S. Border Patrol PBR Pittsburgh presented by Ariat	February 13, 2026	Arizona Ridge Riders	86.40	170.45	Austin Gamblers
Progressive PBR Jacksonville	February 20, 2026	Texas Rattlers	160.25	167.15	Nashville Stampede
Progressive PBR Jacksonville	February 20, 2026	Carolina Cowboys	158.70	169.25	Florida Freedom
PBR Bridgeport	February 27, 2026	Texas Rattlers	00.00	87.30	Missouri Thunder
PBR Bridgeport	February 27, 2026	New York Mavericks	82.60	252.10	Oklahoma Wildcatters
Kubota PBR Little Rock	March 6, 2026	Florida Freedom	86.90	85.25	New York Mavericks
Kubota PBR Little Rock	March 6, 2026	Kansas City Outlaws	173.05	00.00	Austin Gamblers
PBR Indianapolis presented by Cooper Tires	March 21, 2026	Arizona Ridge Riders	84.30	87.25	Kansas City Outlaws
PBR Indianapolis presented by Cooper Tires	March 21, 2026	Carolina Cowboys	88.70	00.00	Nashville Stampede
METC Championship Tournament
PBR Albuquerque Ty Murray Invitational; Semifinals	March 27, 2026	No. 1 Missouri Thunder	83.65	00.00	No. 4 Florida Freedom
PBR Billings; Semifinals	April 17, 2026	No. 2 Austin Gamblers	347.70	261.45	No. 3 Kansas City Outlaws
Cooper Tires PBR Tacoma; METC Championship	April 24, 2026	No. 1 Missouri Thunder	254.75	171.35	No. 2 Austin Gamblers

=== Playoffs ===
Semifinals
March 29 – Albuquerque, New Mexico
No. 4 Florida Freedom	0.00
No. 1 Missouri Thunder	83.65
April 17 – Billings, Montana
No. 3 Kansas City Outlaws	261.45
No. 2 Austin Gamblers	347.70

METC Championship
April 24 – Tacoma, Washington
No. 1 Missouri Thunder	254.75
No. 2 Austin Gamblers	171.35
