= John Crimber =

American bull rider

Personal information
- Full name: John Crimber
- Nicknames: Mr. October; The Phenom
- Nationality: American
- Born: August 11, 2005 (age 21) Decatur, Texas, U.S.
- Height: 5 ft 6.9 in (170 cm)
- Weight: 141 lb (64 kg)
- Life partner: Ceily Simpton

Sport
- Country: United States
- Sport: Rodeo
- Handedness: Left
- Rank: 1st (PBR); 6th (PRCA)
- Event: Bull riding
- Circuits: PBR (2023–present); PRCA (2026–present)
- Team: Florida Freedom
- Turned pro: 2023
- Coached by: Paulo Crimber

Achievements and titles
- World finals: 2024 PBRWF: 2nd; 2025 PBRWF: 14th; 2026 PBRWF: 6th
- National finals: 2026 NFR: Qualified
- Highest world ranking: PBR: 1st (2026); PRCA: 6th (2026)
- Personal bests: 95.00 pts vs. Big Bank; May 19, 2024
- Updated on September 22, 2026

John Crimber (born August 11, 2005) is an American professional rodeo cowboy who specializes in bull riding. He competes in the Professional Bull Riders (PBR) and Professional Rodeo Cowboys Association (PRCA) circuits. He is nicknamed "Mr. October" for his clutch walk-offs in the PBR Team Series Championship. He won the PBR Team Series Regular-Season MVP title in 2024 and 2025, while winning the PBR Team Series Championship MVP title in 2024. He won the PBR World Championship in 2026.

== Early career ==
Crimber won the Mini Bull Riders (MBR) Senior Division championship in 2019. He won the Texas High School Rodeo Association (THSRA) Rookie of the Year and bull riding titles in 2021. He won the National High School Rodeo Association (NHSRA) bull riding title in 2021 and 2022. In 2023, he won the bull riding average at the World Championship Junior Rodeo (WCJR) in Guthrie, Oklahoma.

== Professional career ==
=== 2023: PBR rookie season ===
Crimber joined the Professional Bull Riders (PBR) circuit during the 2023 season, immediately upon turning 18. On August 12, the day after his birthday, he made his debut in the Challenger Series in Goliad, Texas, getting his first qualified ride on Collusion, scoring 84 points and finishing third in the event. Crimber got his first career Challenger Series event win on August 18 at the 8 Second Chute Out in Lamar, Missouri.

On September 14, Crimber notched his first professional-career 90-point ride on Hades at the PBR Stockyards Showcase in Fort Worth, Texas. He also added an 89-point ride in round two to secure the event win.

On October 12, Crimber matched his career high of 90 points when he rode Elkins 041 at the PBR Stockyards Showcase, winning his ninth event of the season. Going into the PBR Challenger Series Championship in Las Vegas, Nevada, Crimber was 76.33 points behind No. 1 Alan de Souza. In Round 1, Crimber rode Huckleberry for 89 points and cut de Souza's lead in the standings to 48.33 pounds. With de Souza not qualifying for the championship round, Crimber needed a qualified ride to win the championship title, but was bucked off by Baby Huey, finishing second in the standings.

=== 2024: First PBR World Finals ===
In 2024, Crimber competed in the Unleash the Beast Series (UTB), Velocity Tour, Touring Pro Division, and was the first overall pick in the Team Series by the Florida Freedom. On January 18, Crimber earned his first event win of the season at the PBR Stockyards Showcase in the Touring Pro Division.

On February 23 in Jacksonville, Florida, Crimber won his first career UTB event, going three-for-three, including a 91-point ride on Doze You Down in the championship round. After qualifying for the PBR Velocity Tour Finals, Crimber would go three-for-three, winning his first career Velocity Tour event in the process.

In May, during the PBR World Finals Eliminations in Fort Worth, Texas, Crimber would tie for two round wins and qualify for the Championship stage in Arlington, Texas. After going one-for-two in the first two rounds of the PBR World Finals Championship, Crimber rode Big Bank for a career-high 95 points, winning the round and putting himself in the event lead. Needing a qualified ride to win the championship, Crimber was bucked off by Hang 'em High, losing the championship to Cassio Dias. Following the PBR World Finals, Crimber was awarded the Lane Frost/Brent Thurman Award for his 95-point ride on Big Bank being the highest-marked ride of the event.

Crimber would join the Florida Freedom after the UTB season. On August 8 against the Oklahoma Wildcatters, Crimber earned his first career walk-off ride when he rode Bambino for 86.5 points. On October 4, Crimber entered the game against the Carolina Cowboys down 111.5 points in the Regular-Season MVP standings to Brady Fielder of the Texas Rattlers. In the game against Carolina, Crimber rode Where's the Whisky for 77.25 points and Umm for 91.25 points to take the lead over Fielder by 57 points. On October 5, Fielder was bucked of by Desperado while Crimber rode High Ball for 90.25 points to maintain the lead in the MVP race. In the final game of the season, Fielder was bucked off by Almost Sober, clinching the Regular-Season MVP title for Crimber.

On November 9, Crimber won the bull riding title during the inaugural edition of the Hondo Rodeo Fest in Phoenix, Arizona.

=== 2025: Injury riddled season ===
On November 16, 2024, Crimber won the UTB event in Tucson, Arizona, highlighted by a 92.5-point ride on Ricky Vaughan in the championship round. On December 8, 2024, Crimber won his second UTB event of the 2025 season in St. Louis, Missouri, highlighted by a score of 91.5 points on Utz BesTex Smokestack in the championship round.

In May, Crimber qualified for and competed at his second PBR World Finals.

Crimber won the PBR Team Series Regular-Season MVP title for the second year in a row. On October 25, at the PBR Team Series Championship in Las Vegas, Crimber rode with the Florida Freedom against the Carolina Cowboys. He rode Man Hater, the two-time and reigning PBR World Champion Bull for 92 points. However, the Freedom lost to the Cowboys and were eliminated from the event.

=== 2026: PBR World Champion and NFR qualification ===
On February 1, 2026, Crimber won the UTB event in Sacramento, California, going four-for-four, including an 88.65-point ride on Tigger in the championship round. On February 7, Crimber finished second in Salt Lake City, Utah. In the process, he took over the number one ranking from Dalton Kasel.

On February 19, Crimber made his Professional Rodeo Cowboys Association (PRCA) debut at the Fort Myers Pro Rodeo in North Fort Myers, Florida. Crimber would finish third in the event after an 84.5-point ride. He also finished third at the Brighton Field Day Festival & Rodeo in Okeechobee, Florida.

On February 20, Crimber rode Margin of Error for 85.7 points during the first round of the UTB event in Jacksonville, Florida. His ride was part of the series of rides in which the Florida Freedom defeated the Carolina Cowboys to win the event's Monster Energy Team Challenge. The next day, Sage Kimzey would finish three-for-three, winning the event and taking over the number one ranking from Crimber.

On February 22, Crimber was at the San Antonio Stock Show & Rodeo in San Antonio, Texas, to watch his friends compete in a PRCA Xtreme Bulls event. He was then asked if he would like to be a walk-up replacement in the event. Accepting the opportunity, Crimber rode Goosebumps for 87.5 points before being bucked off Smokin' Joe in the championship round to finish fifth in the event. On February 27, it was announced that Crimber bought his PRCA Rookie Card with plans to qualify for the National Finals Rodeo (NFR).

On March 12, Crimber won the first round at the Arcadia All-Florida Championship Rodeo in Arcadia, Florida, with 89 points on Curve Ball. This led to him winning his first PRCA event. On March 14, Crimber finished third at the UTB event in Tallahassee, Florida. In the process, he surpassed Kimzey to retake the lead in the PBR world championship race.

On April 3, Crimber won the first round at the Central Ark PRCA Rodeo in El Paso, Arkansas, with 86.5 points on Black Tornado to win the event. At the UTB event in Sioux Falls, South Dakota, which was held April 10-12, Crimber rode Cherry Shot for 86.95 points to tie for eighth/ninth with Claudio Montanha Jr. in Round 1. In Round 2, Crimber rode Rolex for 89.40 points to win the round. In Round 3, he rode Scrappy for 89.95 for another round win. In the Championship Round, he rode Lights Out for 91.50 to win the third round in a row and the overall event. He was the only contestant to successfully ride all four bulls at the event.

Crimber qualified for his third consecutive PBR World Finals, which was held May 7-10 and 14-17, and came in first in the PBR world championship race going into the event. He bucked off his first five bulls. However, he bounced back and successfully rode his next four bulls, highlighted by a Round 8-winning ride of 91.35 points on What's Poppin' and a Championship Round-winning ride of 92.9 points on Tigger. Crimber clinched the 2026 world championship title, becoming the second-youngest PBR world champion after Jess Lockwood in 2017.

Following the PBR World Finals, Crimber went straight to the PRCA trail and went on a winning streak in late May, where he won the first round of several rodeos, which led to overall victories. On May 22, Crimber rode Resistol's Gray for 87.5 points to win the Bandera ProRodeo in Bandera, Texas. On May 25, Crimber rode Adam's Money Maker for 85.5 points to win the Old Fort Days Rodeo in Fort Smith, Arkansas. On May 27, Crimber rode Russell Coight for 86 points to win the Crossett Riding Club in Crossett, Arkansas. On May 29, Crimber rode Clean Slate for 87 points to win the Hugo Pro Rodeo in Hugo, Oklahoma. That same month, Crimber also finished second at the Will Rogers Stampede in Claremore, Oklahoma, the Durant Pro Rodeo in Durant, Oklahoma, and Rodeo Celina in McKinney, Texas.

On June 9, Crimber rode JagMetals Domestic Violence for 89.5 points to win the Parker County Sheriff's Posse Frontier Days Xtreme Bulls in Weatherford, Texas. On June 10, Crimber rode Sea of Sorrow for 88.5 points to win the Gladewater Round-Up Xtreme Bulls in Gladewater, Texas. On June 11, Crimber rode Kippers Ripper for 92.5 to win the overall event at the Woodward Elks Rodeo in Woodward, Oklahoma. On June 13, Crimber returned to the Parker County Sheriff's Posse Frontier Days in Gladewater, Texas, to compete at the full rodeo, where he scored 89.5 points on Richard Slam and finished tying for first place with T. Parker. Throughout June, Crimber also placed at the Snake River Stampede in Nampa, Idaho, the Fred Berger Memorial Xtreme Bulls in Bismarck, North Dakota, and the Reno Rodeo in Reno, Nevada.

On July 12, during the second day of Bulls and Beats, the first PBR Team Series event of the season in Fort Collins, Colorado, Crimber rode Dirty Honey for 91.9 points to help the Florida Freedom defeat the Arizona Ridge Riders 273.5-178.3. Throughout late July, Crimber also placed at the Cheyenne Frontier Days Xtreme Bulls and rodeo in Cheyenne, Wyoming, Ogden Pioneer Days in Ogden, Utah, and the Utah Days of '47 Rodeo in Salt Lake City, Utah.

On August 2, during the third day of Wildcatter Days, the hometown event of the Oklahoma Wildcatters in Oklahoma City, Oklahoma, Crimber rode Rock 'n Roll for 89.5 points to help the Florida Freedom defeat the Austin Gamblers 178.65-89.3. In August, Crimber also placed at the Cowtown Rodeo Xtreme Bulls in Pilesgrove Township, New Jersey, and the Golden Spike Rodeo in Tremonton, Utah.

In early September, Crimber signed a contract extension to ride for the Florida Freedom through 2029. He was also excused by the PBR to compete exclusively in PRCA events for the final month of the regular season to try to earn enough money to qualify for the NFR.

On September 11, Crimber rode Peace Out for 85 points to win the Spokane Interstate Rodeo in Spokane Valley, Washington. On September 13, Crimber rode Splitting Tens for 87 points to win the Puyallup Rodeo in Puyallup, Washington. On September 18, Crimber rode Wild Skunk for 86.5 points to win the Othello PRCA Rodeo in Othello, Washington, and on that same day, he rode Astro Outlaw for 88.5 points to win the North Dakota Roughrider Cup in Mandan, North Dakota. Throughout September, Crimber also placed at the West Texas Fair & Rodeo in Abilene, Texas, the Pendleton Round-Up in Pendleton, Oregon, and the Governor's Cup in Sioux Falls, South Dakota. He finished the PRCA regular season ranked sixth with $254,339 won and qualified for his first NFR.

Crimber had intended to return to the PBR Team Series once the PRCA regular season had ended. However, he had sustained a groin injury in Puyallup and was sidelined for the rest of the Team Series regular season in October. He made his return to competition during the first day of the Team Series Championship in Las Vegas on November 6, where he was bucked off by Kamikaze and the Florida Freedom as a whole had failed to qualify for the rest of the three-day event.

== Milestones ==
Championships

- PBR World Champion (2026)
- PBR Velocity Tour Finals Champion (2024)
- Hondo Rodeo Fest Bull Riding Champion (2024)
- WCJR Bull Riding Average Champion (2023)
- 2× NHSRA Bull Riding Champion (2021, 2022)
- THSRA Bull Riding State Champion (2021)
- MBR Senior Division Champion (2019)

Qualifications

- National Finals Rodeo qualifier (2026)
- 3× PBR World Finals qualifier (2024, 2025, 2026)
- PRCA Governor's Cup qualifier (2026)
- 2× PBR Velocity Tour Finals qualifier (2024, 2025)
- PBR Challenger Series Championship qualifier (2023)
- 3× National High School Finals Rodeo qualifier (2021, 2022, 2024)

Awards

- Lane Frost/Brent Thurman Award (2024)
- 2× PBR Team Series Regular-Season MVP (2024, 2025)
- PBR Team Series Championship MVP (2024)
- THSRA Rookie of the Year (2021)

Records

- Youngest rider in PBR history to win 10 rounds (18 years, 8 months, 8 days)
- Youngest rider in PBR history to reach $1,000,000 in career earnings (19 years, 3 months, 10 days)
- Youngest rider in PBR history to reach $2,000,000 in career earnings (20 years, 9 months, 6 days)
- Second-youngest rider in PBR history to win a world title (20 years, 9 months, 6 days)
- Highest scored ride at Denny Sanford Premier Center: 92.00 (September 27, 2026, vs. Seek and Destroy)

== Personal life ==
Crimber was born in Decatur, Texas, to Brazilian parents Paulo and María Crimber. According to his father, the name "John" originated because English speakers had difficulty pronouncing "João". John also has a younger sister.

Paulo Crimber was a professional bull rider, active from 1998 to 2011, who also competed in the PBR and PRCA circuits. He qualified for the PBR World Finals 10 times and won the 2004 National Finals Rodeo bull riding average, the year before John was born. He is also the head coach of the Florida Freedom, the PBR team John rides for.

Three-time PBR world champion Adriano Morães is John's godfather.
