= 2026 Governor's Cup =

Rodeo competition

- Sport: Rodeo
- Events: Bareback riding; Barrel racing; Breakaway roping; Bull riding; Saddle bronc riding; Steer roping; Steer wrestling; Team roping; Tie-down roping
- Organization: PRCA
- Series: Cinch Playoff Series
- Dates: September 25–27, 2026
- Venue: Denny Sanford Premier Center
- Location: Sioux Falls, South Dakota, U.S.
- Contestants: 120
- Rounds: 4
- Purse: $1,500,003

Champions
- Bareback riding: Clayton Biglow
- Steer wrestling: Dalton Massey
- Team roping: Tyler Tryan; Nicky Northcott
- Saddle bronc riding: Statler Wright
- Tie-down roping: Haven Meged
- Steer roping: Cole Patterson
- Breakaway roping: Josie Conner
- Barrel racing: Andrea Busby
- Bull riding: Noah Lee

The 2026 Governor's Cup is an American professional rodeo competition sanctioned by the Professional Rodeo Cowboys Association (PRCA) and Women's Professional Rodeo Association (WPRA). The event, held in Sioux Falls, South Dakota, features top PRCA and WPRA contestants competing for the Governor's Cup title across multiple rodeo events. The four semifinals from the Puyallup Rodeo and the top eight contestants in the Cinch Playoff Series Standings qualified for the Governor's Cup.

== Background ==
=== Road to Sioux Falls ===
The Cinch Playoff Series began in January, featuring 60 of the highest-paying professional rodeos in the United States. The Playoff Series is tracked via points instead of total money earned, with the top athletes competing for a spot in the Cinch Playoffs Wild Card in Puyallup, Washington. To qualify for the Puyallup Rodeo, contestants had to rank in the top 23 of their events standings or win the NFR Open that was held from July 14–18 at Norris-Penrose Event Center in Colorado Springs, Colorado. The Puyallup Rodeo was held from September 10–13 at the Washington State Fair. From there, the top four semifinals and the remaining eight highest-ranked contestants qualified for the Governor's Cup at Denny Sanford Premier Center in Sioux Falls, South Dakota.

=== Payout structure ===
During Rounds 1 and 2, first place receives $12,533; second place receives $9,400; third place receives $6,266; and fourth place receives $3,133. During the Semifinals, fifth through eighth place is awarded $4,500 each. During the Finals, first place is awarded $34,000; second place is awarded $26,000; third place is awarded $17,000; and fourth place is awarded $9,000. The total purse for the event was over $1.5 million.

== Bareback riding ==
=== Qualifiers ===
Puyallup qualifiers – top 4
- Jess Pope
- Keenan Hayes
- Bradlee Miller
- Garrett Shadbolt
Playoff Series qualifiers – next 8
- Kade Sonnier
- Jayco Roper
- Leighton Berry
- Jacob Lees
- Cole Reiner
- R.C. Landingham
- Clayton Biglow
- Cooper Cooke

=== Long Round 1 ===
Bareback Riding Long Round 1 results
	Rider	Stock	Score	Payoff
1	Cooper Cooke	8119 Wanda's Medicine	88.00	$12,533
2	Garrett Shadbolt	497 Hot Mocha	86.50	$9,400
3	Keenan Hayes	U14 Bald Eagle	85.75	$6,267
4	Jacob Lees	850 Wild Child	84.75	$3,133
5	Jayco Roper	Q37 Peach Juice	84.00	—
6	R.C. Landingham	9738 Blue Blood	83.75	—
7	Clayton Biglow	414 Hell's Fire	83.50	—
8	Cole Reiner	350 Ranch & Co Time	83.25	—
9	Leighton Berry	617 Red Sunset	82.00	—
10	Jess Pope	831 Mudslide	81.25	—
11	Kade Sonnier	927 Maria Bartomoro	81.00	—
12	Bradlee Miller	702 Little Lunatic	80.50	—

=== Long Round 2 ===
Bareback Riding Long Round 2 results
	Rider	Stock	Score	Payoff
1	Clayton Biglow	64 Sky Wars	86.50	$12,533
2	Jacob Lees	030 Pow Wow Nights	86.25	$9,400
3	Bradlee Miller	800 Sum Buck	86.00	$6,267
4	Jess Pope	828 Ready To Rock	85.75	$3,133
5	Cooper Cooke	62 All Eyes on A	84.75	—
6	Keenan Hayes	877 Drink Of Choice	83.75	—
7	R.C. Landingham	937 Monkey Wrench	83.75	—
8	Jayco Roper	C5 Captain Hook	83.00	—
9	Kade Sonnier	107 Hooey Rocks	82.50	—
10	Garrett Shadbolt	P49 Gander Goose	82.00	—
11	Cole Reiner	728 Visually Assault	58.50	—
12	Leighton Berry	Did not compete		

=== Semifinals ===
Bareback Riding Semifinals results
	Rider	Stock	Score	Payoff
1	Clayton Biglow	U7 Bobby's Peaches	89.00	—
2	Jayco Roper	773 Candy Man	86.75	—
3	Jess Pope	488 Midnight Special	86.50	—
4	Keenan Hayes	U10 Cosmic Stardust	86.50	—
5	Cooper Cooke	6 Sweet Tequila	85.00	$4,500
6	R.C. Landingham	9947 Bootch	84.50	$4,500
7	Garrett Shadbolt	16 Sippin Firewater	84.00	$4,500
8	Jacob Lees	908 Straight Guitar	74.50	$4,500

=== Finals ===
Bareback Riding Finals results
	Rider	Stock	Score	Payoff
1	Clayton Biglow	Q52 Ranch & Crow Interiors	90.75	$34,000
2	Jayco Roper	H119 Watermelon Moonshine	89.25	$17,333
2	Jess Pope	871 Bottoms Up Chuck	89.25	$17,333
2	Keenan Hayes	152- Terry	89.25	$17,333

== Steer wrestling ==
=== Qualifiers ===
Puyallup qualifiers – top 4

Playoff Series qualifiers – next 8

=== Long Round 1 ===
Steer Wrestling Long Round 1 results
	Wrestler	Time	Payoff
1	Dalton Massey	3.4 s	$12,533
2	Jesse Brown	4.0 s	$9,400
3	Eli Lord	4.2 s	$4,700
3	Rowdy Parrott	4.2 s	$4,700
5	J.D. Struxness	4.4 s	—
6	Cash Robb	4.6 s	—
6	Justin Shaffer	4.6 s	—
8	Tristan Martin	4.9 s	—
9	Bridger Anderson	5.0 s	—
10	Seth Peterson	5.5 s	—
11	Mike McGinn	0.0 s	—
11	Tyler Waguespack	0.0 s	—

=== Long Round 2 ===
Steer Wrestling Long Round 2 results
	Wrestler	Time	Payoff
1	Jesse Brown	3.6 s	$12,533
2	Seth Peterson	3.7 s	$9,400
3	Cash Robb	4.0 s	$6,267
4	J.D. Struxness	4.3 s	$3,133
5	Mike McGinn	4.5 s	—
5	Dalton Massey	4.5 s	—
7	Tristan Martin	4.7 s	—
8	Tyler Waguespack	4.8 s	—
8	Bridger Anderson	4.8 s	—
8	Rowdy Parrott	4.8 s	—
11	Justin Shaffer	5.0 s	—
12	Eli Lord	0.0 s	—

=== Semifinals ===
Steer Wrestling Semifinals results
	Wrestler	Time	Payoff
1	Rowdy Parrott	3.3 s	—
2	Dalton Massey	3.7 s	—
2	Jesse Brown	3.7 s	—
4	Tristan Martin	3.9 s	—
5	J.D. Struxness	4.0 s	$4,500
6	Justin Shaffer	4.1 s	$4,500
7	Seth Peterson	14.1 s	$4,500
8	Cash Robb	0.0 s	$4,500

=== Finals ===
Steer Wrestling Finals results
	Wrestler	Time	Payoff
1	Dalton Massey	3.7 s	$34,000
2	Jesse Brown	3.9 s	$21,500
2	Rowdy Parrott	3.9 s	$21,500
4	Tristan Martin	5.4 s	$9,000

== Team roping ==
=== Qualifiers ===
Puyallup qualifiers – top 4

Playoff Series qualifiers – next 8

=== Long Round 1 ===
Team Roping Long Round 1 results
	Header	Heeler	Score	Payoff
1	Kaleb Driggers	Junior Nunes Nogueira	3.8 s	$12,533
2	Lightning Aguilera	Ross Ashford	4.1 s	$9,400
3	Dawson Graham	Dillon Graham	4.2 s	$6,267
4	Tyler Tryan	Nicky Northcott	4.3 s	$3,133
5	James Arviso	Levi Lord	4.5 s	—
6	Andrew Ward	Jake Long	4.8 s	—
7	Jake Smith	Douglas Rich	5.2 s	—
8	Tanner Tomlinson	Coleby Payne	9.7 s	—
9	Garrett Tonozzi	Trey Yates	22.8 s	—
10	Luke Brown	Hunter Koch	0.0 s	—
10	Cory Kidd	Carson Johnson	0.0 s	—
10	Cody Snow	Lane Mitchell	0.0 s	—

=== Long Round 2 ===
Team Roping Long Round 2 results
	Header	Heeler	Score	Payoff
1	James Arviso	Levi Lord	4.0 s	$12,533
2	Cory Kidd	Carson Johnson	4.4 s	$9,400
3	Kaleb Driggers	Junior Nunes Nogueira	5.8 s	$6,267
4	Tyler Tryan	Nicky Northcott	10.4 s	$3,133
5	Jake Smith	Douglas Rich	16.4 s	—
6	Luke Brown	Hunter Koch	0.0 s	—
6	Andrew Ward	Jake Long	0.0 s	—
6	Garrett Tonozzi	Trey Yates	0.0 s	—
6	Lightning Aguilera	Ross Ashford	0.0 s	—
6	Cody Snow	Lane Mitchell	0.0 s	—
6	Tanner Tomlinson	Coleby Payne	0.0 s	—
6	Dawson Graham	Dillon Graham	0.0 s	—

=== Semifinals ===
Team Roping Semifinals results
	Header	Heeler	Score	Payoff
1	Andrew Ward	Jake Long	4.0 s	—
2	Tyler Tryan	Nicky Northcott	4.4 s	—
3	Kaleb Driggers	Junior Nunes Nogueira	4.6 s	—
4	James Arviso	Levi Lord	4.8 s	—
5	Jake Smith	Douglas Rich	5.1 s	$4,500
6	Cory Kidd	Carson Johnson	0.0 s	$4,500
6	Lightning Aguilera	Ross Ashford	0.0 s	$4,500
6	Dawson Graham	Dillon Graham	0.0 s	$4,500

=== Finals ===
Team Roping Finals results (Note: Kaleb Driggers and Junior Nunes Nogueira won the tiebreaker over James Arviso and Levi Lord due to previous times.)
	Header	Heeler	Score	Payoff
1	Tyler Tryan	Nicky Northcott	4.4 s	$34,000
2	Andrew Ward	Jake Long	4.6 s	$26,000
3	Kaleb Driggers	Junior Nunes Nogueira	0.0 s	$17,000
4	James Arviso	Levi Lord	0.0 s	$9,000

== Saddle bronc riding ==
=== Qualifiers ===
Puyallup qualifiers – top 4

Playoff Series qualifiers – next 8

=== Long Round 1 ===
Saddle Bronc Riding Long Round 1 results
	Rider	Stock	Score	Payoff
1	Brody Cress	N20 Devil's Advocate	87.25	$12,533
2	Kade Bruno	7 Candy Coated	87.00	$9,400
3	Zeke Thurston	800 I'm A Dandy	86.25	$6,267
4	Statler Wright	H361 Bugatti	85.75	$1,567
4	Waitley Sharon	527 Tom's Toddy	85.75	$1,567
6	Ryder Wright	652 Blue Northern	85.25	—
7	Wyatt Casper	708 Bravo Brunson	85.00	—
8	Stetson Wright	0303 Bronchitis	84.50	—
9	Rusty Wright	447 Capone	84.25	—
10	Damian Brennan	-528 Peacemaker	83.00	—
11	Brody Wells	61 Blue Canyon	0.00	—
11	Zac Dallas	07 Hot & Hairy	0.00	—

=== Long Round 2 ===
Saddle Bronc Riding Long Round 2 results
	Rider	Stock	Score	Payoff
1	Zeke Thurston	171 Heart Breaker	87.50	$12,533
2	Ryder Wright	922 Jukebox Johnny	87.00	$9,400
3	Rusty Wright	508 Painted Habitat	85.50	$4,700
3	Zac Dallas	2 Disco Inferno	85.50	$4,700
5	Brody Wells	111 All Jacked Up	85.00	—
6	Wyatt Casper	L9 Bonafide	84.25	—
7	Kade Bruno	433 Midnight Deals	83.75	—
8	Stetson Wright	648 Moose	83.50	—
8	Waitley Sharon	635 Calico Color	83.50	—
10	Statler Wright	S3 Bobby Shows	82.50	—
11	Damian Brennan	036 Harry Rocks	81.50	—
12	Brody Cress	08 Glacier 45	0.00	—

=== Semifinals ===
Saddle Bronc Riding Semifinals results (Note: Zeke Thurston won the tiebreaker over Wyatt Casper due to higher average finish.)
	Rider	Stock	Score	Payoff
1	Stetson Wright	808 Twiggy	88.00	—
2	Statler Wright	156- Charlotte Johnson	86.75	—
3	Kade Bruno	637 Miss Chestnuts L	85.75	—
4	Zeke Thurston	R8 Cotton Candy	85.50	—
5	Wyatt Casper	512 Tommy Boy	85.50	$4,500
6	Waitley Sharon	4361 Bugsy	85.25	$4,500
7	Ryder Wright	R69 Mighty Mo	83.50	$4,500
8	Rusty Wright	J43 Optiwize's Tickled Pink	83.25	$4,500

=== Finals ===
Saddle Bronc Riding Finals results
	Rider	Stock	Score	Payoff
1	Statler Wright	026 Ozark	90.75	$34,000
2	Zeke Thurston	105 Resistol's Black	89.50	$26,000
3	Stetson Wright	606 Swanny	87.75	$17,000
4	Kade Bruno	-42 Miss Valley	87.00	$9,000

== Tie-down roping ==
=== Qualifiers ===
Puyallup qualifiers – top 4

Playoff Series qualifiers – next 8

=== Long Round 1 ===
Tie-Down Roping Long Round 1 results
	Roper	Time	Payoff
1	Kincade Henry	7.5 s	$12,533
2	Joel Harris	7.7 s	$9,400
3	Shane Hanchey	8.0 s	$4,700
3	Haven Meged	8.0 s	$4,700
5	Shad Mayfield	8.7 s	—
6	Trevor Hale	8.8 s	—
7	Buck Calhoun	9.6 s	—
7	John Douch	9.6 s	—
9	Riley Webb	9.8 s	—
10	Cory Solomon	10.9 s	—
11	Dylan Hancock	0.0 s	—
11	Ty Harris	0.0 s	—

=== Long Round 2 ===
Tie-Down Roping Long Round 2 results
	Roper	Time	Payoff
1	Riley Webb	7.2 s	$12,533
2	Buck Calhoun	7.5 s	$9,400
3	Trevor Hale	8.3 s	$6,267
4	Joel Harris	8.4 s	$3,133
5	Cory Solomon	8.8 s	—
6	Haven Meged	8.9 s	—
7	Shad Mayfield	9.7 s	—
8	Shane Hanchey	9.9 s	—
9	Kincade Henry	12.6 s	—
10	John Douch	17.0 s	—
11	Dylan Hancock	18.7 s	—
12	Ty Harris	0.0 s	—

=== Semifinals ===
Tie-Down Roping Semifinals results
	Roper	Time	Payoff
1	Riley Webb	6.6 s	—
2	Cory Solomon	7.4 s	—
2	Buck Calhoun	7.4 s	—
2	Haven Meged	7.4 s	—
5	Shad Mayfield	7.5 s	$4,500
6	Trevor Hale	7.7 s	$4,500
7	Shane Hanchey	10.7 s	$4,500
8	Joel Harris	0.0 s	$4,500

=== Finals ===
Tie-Down Roping Finals results
	Roper	Time	Payoff
1	Haven Meged	7.7 s	$34,000
2	Cory Solomon	8.8 s	$26,000
3	Buck Calhoun	9.3 s	$17,000
4	Riley Webb	0.0 s	$9,000

== Steer roping ==
=== Qualifiers ===
Puyallup qualifiers – top 4

Playoff Series qualifiers – next 8

=== Long Round 1 ===
Steer Roping Long Round 1 results
	Roper	Time	Payoff
1	Cody Lee	10.9 s	$4,800
2	Riley O'Rourke	11.2 s	$3,600
3	Cole Patterson	11.5 s	$2,400
4	Roger Nonella	12.2 s	$1,200
5	Chet Herren	12.3 s	—
6	Tanner Stec	12.4 s	—
7	Vin Fisher	20.2 s	—
8	Scott Snedecor	0.0 s	—
8	Troy Tillard	0.0 s	—
8	Wade Shoemaker	0.0 s	—
8	Tony Reina	0.0 s	—
8	Taylor Santos	0.0 s	—

=== Long Round 2 ===
Steer Roping Long Round 2 results
	Roper	Time	Payoff
1	Cole Patterson	8.8 s	$4,800
2	Riley O'Rourke	9.6 s	$3,600
3	Chet Herren	9.7 s	$2,400
4	Vin Fisher	10.1 s	$1,200
5	Roger Nonella	11.2 s	—
6	Tanner Stec	11.4 s	—
7	Taylor Santos	12.6 s	—
8	Tony Reina	14.8 s	—
9	Scott Snedecor	0.0 s	—
9	Troy Tillard	0.0 s	—
9	Wade Shoemaker	0.0 s	—
9	Cody Lee	0.0 s	—

=== Semifinals ===
Steer Roping Semifinals results
	Roper	Time	Payoff
1	Cole Patterson	9.8 s	—
2	Taylor Santos	10.3 s	—
3	Roger Nonella	10.7 s	—
4	Tanner Stec	12.2 s	—
5	Cody Lee	14.3 s	$1,500
6	Vin Fisher	17.7 s	$1,500
7	Riley O'Rourke	19.1 s	$1,500
8	Chet Herren	0.0 s	$1,500

=== Finals ===
Steer Roping Finals results
	Roper	Time	Payoff
1	Cole Patterson	8.8 s	$12,000
2	Roger Nonella	9.8 s	$9,000
3	Tanner Stec	10.1 s	$6,000
4	Taylor Santos	0.0 s	$3,000

== Breakaway roping ==
=== Qualifiers ===
Puyallup qualifiers – top 4

Playoff Series qualifiers – next 8

=== Long Round 1 ===
Breakaway Roping Long Round 1 results
	Roper	Time	Payoff
1	Jordi Edens-Mitchell	1.7 s	$10,967
1	Josie Conner	1.7 s	$10,967
3	Hali Williams	1.9 s	$6,266
4	Jill Tanner	2.1 s	$3,133
5	Jordan Hollabaugh	2.2 s	—
6	Danielle Lowman	2.3 s	—
7	Martha Angelo	2.5 s	—
8	Bradi Good	2.7 s	—
9	Jackie Crawford	3.0 s	—
10	Rylee George	0.0 s	—
10	Cheyanne McCartney	0.0 s	—
10	Haiden Thompson	0.0 s	—

=== Long Round 2 ===
Breakaway Roping Long Round 2 results (Note: Rylee George won the tiebreaker over Josie Conner to move onto the Finals due to world standings.)
	Roper	Time	Payoff
1	Rylee George	1.7 s	$12,533
2	Haiden Thompson	1.8 s	$9,400
3	Hali Williams	1.9 s	$6,266
4	Jordi Edens-Mitchell	2.0 s	$3,133
5	Danielle Lowman	2.1 s	—
5	Bradi Good	2.1 s	—
7	Martha Angelone	2.4 s	—
8	Jackie Crawford	3.2 s	—
9	Jill Tanner	12.1 s	—
10	Rylee George	0.0 s	—
10	Jordan Hollabaugh	0.0 s	—
10	Cheyanne McCartney	0.0 s	—

=== Semifinals ===
Breakaway Roping Semifinals results
	Roper	Time	Payoff
1	Martha Angelone	2.0 s	—
2	Jackie Crawford	2.2 s	—
3	Josie Conner	2.3 s	—
4	Bradi Good	12.3 s	—
5	Hali Williams	0.0 s	$4,500
5	Jordi Edens-Mitchell	0.0 s	$4,500
7	Danielle Lowman	0.0 s	$4,500
8	Jill Tanner	0.0 s	$4,500

=== Finals ===
Breakaway Roping Finals results
	Roper	Time	Payoff
1	Josie Conner	1.9 s	$34,000
2	Bradi Good	2.4 s	$21,500
2	Martha Angelone	2.4 s	$21,500
4	Jackie Crawford	0.0 s	$9,000

== Barrel racing ==
=== Qualifiers ===
Puyallup qualifiers – top 4
- Carlee Otero
- Megan McLeod-Sprague
- Lisa Lockhart
- Michelle Alley
Playoff Series qualifiers – next 8
- Emily Beisel
- Hayle Gibson-Stillwell
- Tayla Moeykens
- Makenzie Mayes
- Sydney Graham
- Katelyn Scott
- Tricia Aldridge
- Andrea Busby

=== Long Round 1 ===
Barrel Racing Long Round 1 results
	Rider	Horse	Time	Payoff
1	Megan McLeod-Sprague	Swoon Ta Be Famous	14.10 s	$12,533
2	Hayle Gibson-Stillwell	Buncha Dinero	14.17 s	$9,400
3	Katelyn Scott	Justa DTF Frenchman	14.37 s	$6,267
4	Emily Beisel	Teasin Dat Guy	14.45 s	$3,133
5	Tayla Moeykens	JM Pocketsdoublecash	14.46 s	—
6	Sydney Graham	Dupont First	14.67 s	—
7	Makenzie Mayes	Kita Rita	14.70 s	—
8	Andrea Busby	Jets Top Gun	19.00 s	—
9	Carlee Otero	AM Regina George	19.34 s	—
10	Tricia Aldridge	Adios Pantalones	19.38 s	—
11	Lisa Lockhart	Whenthestarsalign	19.53 s	—
12	Michelle Alley	Lipstick N Stilletos	24.58 s	—

=== Long Round 2 ===
Barrel Racing Long Round 2 results
	Rider	Horse	Time	Payoff
1	Lisa Lockhart	Whenthestarsalign	13.73 s	$12,533
2	Hayle Gibson-Stillwell	Buncha Dinero	13.94 s	$9,400
3	Megan McLeod-Sprague	Swoon Ta Be Famous	13.95 s	$6,267
4	Tricia Aldridge	Adios Pantalones	13.99 s	$3,133
5	Carlee Otero	AM Regina George	14.08 s	—
6	Andrea Busby	Jets Top Gun	14.12 s	—
7	Emily Beisel	Teasin Dat Guy	14.16 s	—
8	Tayla Moeykens	JM Pocketsdoublecash	14.29 s	—
9	Katelyn Scott	Justa DTF Frenchman	14.43 s	—
10	Makenzie Mayes	Kita Rita	14.83 s	—
11	Michelle Alley	Lipstick N Stilletos	19.28 s	—
12	Sydney Graham	Dupont First	19.34 s	—

=== Semifinals ===
Barrel Racing Semifinals results (Note: Emily Beisel won the tiebreaker over Katelyn Scott due to higher average finish.)
	Rider	Horse	Time	Payoff
1	Andrea Busby	Jets Top Gun	13.96 s	—
2	Megan McLeod-Sprague	Swoon Ta Be Famous	13.98 s	—
2	Makenzie Mayes	Chicado Moon	13.98 s	—
4	Emily Beisel	Teasin Dat Guy	14.09 s	—
4	Katelyn Scott	Justa DTF Frenchman	14.09 s	$4,500
6	Lisa Lockhart	Whenthestarsalign	18.81 s	$4,500
7	Tayla Moeykens	JM Pocketsdoubledash	19.17 s	$4,500
8	Hayle Gibson-Stillwell	Buncha Dinero	19.29 s	$4,500

=== Finals ===
Barrel Racing Finals results
	Rider	Horse	Time	Payoff
1	Andrea Busby	Jets Top Gun	14.02 s	$34,000
2	Emily Beisel	Teasin Dat Guy	14.04 s	$26,000
3	Makenzie Mayes	Chicado Moon	14.18 s	$17,000
4	Megan McLeod-Sprague	Swoon Ta Be Famous	14.30 s	$9,000

== Bull riding ==
=== Qualifiers ===
Puyallup qualifiers – top 4
- Colten Fritzlan
- John Crimber (R)
- Dakota Hill
- Jace Trosclair
Playoff Series qualifiers – next 8
- Tristen Hutchings
- Luke Mackey
- Stetson Wright
- Noah Lee (R)
- T.J. Gray
- Hayden Welsh (R)
- Qynn Andersen
- Lane Vaughan

=== Long Round 1 ===
Bull Riding Long Round 1 results
	Rider	Stock	Score	Payoff
1	Qynn Andersen	202 Humboldt	90.00	$12,533
2	John Crimber	41-L Road Trip	89.75	$9,400
3	Lane Vaughan	121 Honky Tonk	89.50	$6,267
4	Noah Lee	1-13 Talking Cursive	89.25	$3,133
5	Stetson Wright	567 Body Rock	88.75	—
6	Hayden Welsh	k95 Diabolical	87.50	—
7	Colten Fritzlan	626 Let Em Go	84.25	—
8	Luke Mackey	711 First Shot	83.00	—
9	T.J. Gray	K54 Midnight Magic	81.00	—
	Dakota Hill	921 Muscle Man	0.00	—
	Tristen Hutchings	27K Warpig	0.00	—
	Jace Trosclair	-95 Redneck	0.00	—

=== Long Round 2 ===
Bull Riding Long Round 2 results
	Rider	Stock	Score	Payoff
1	Luke Mackey	213 Wild and Blue	89.75	$12,533
2	Noah Lee	128 Love Country	89.50	$9,400
3	Stetson Wright	133 Goosebumps	89.25	$6,267
4	Hayden Welsh	235 Vegas Magic	86.50	$3,133
5	Colten Fritzlan	-015 Delta Blues	85.25	—
6	T.J. Gray	31J Body Bag	85.00	—
	Dakota Hill	50 Heedid	0.00	—
	Lane Vaughan	914 Badlands	0.00	—
	Jace Trosclair	0802 Little Z	0.00	—
	Tristen Hutchings	-949 Puckered Up	0.00	—
	Qynn Andersen	292 Circus Freak	0.00	—
	John Crimber	76 Sneaky Situation	0.00	—

=== Semifinals ===
Bull Riding Semifinals results (Note: Noah Lee moved on to the Finals due to higher average.)
	Rider	Stock	Score	Payoff
1	John Crimber	124 Seek and Destroy	92.00	—
2	Qynn Andersen	247K Wrecking Crew	89.50	—
3	Luke Mackey	811X Blowing Smoke	88.75	—
	Noah Lee	+C34 Midnight Hammer	0.00	—
	T.J. Gray	80K Trash Panda	0.00	$4,500
	Colten Fritzlan	111 Tiger King	0.00	$4,500
	Hayden Welsh	207 Johnny Walker Red	0.00	$4,500
	Stetson Wright	803 Guess Who	0.00	$4,500

=== Finals ===
Bull Riding Finals results
	Rider	Stock	Score	Payoff
1	Noah Lee	129 Cowboy Kool	92.00	$34,000
2	John Crimber	969 Bogeyman	88.50	$26,000
3	Qynn Anderson	904 Black Sheep	87.50	$17,000
4	Luke Mackey	891F Testified	0.00	$9,000
