= Unleash the Beast Series =

Bullriding competition

- Most recent season or competition: 2026 UTB season
- Formerly: Bud Light Cup Series (1994–2002); Built Ford Tough Series (2003–2017)
- Sport: Bull riding
- Founded: January 5, 2018; 8 years ago
- First season: 2018
- Organizing body: Professional Bull Riders
- Country: United States
- Headquarters: Pueblo, Colorado, U.S. (2018–2024); Fort Worth, Texas, U.S. (2024–present)
- Last champion: John Crimber (2026)
- Most titles: José Vitor Leme (3 titles)
- Broadcasters: CBSSN (2018–2024); CBS (2024–present); TUDN (2024; Spanish)
- Streaming partners: Vix (2024; Spanish); YouTube (2024–2025); RidePass (2024–2025); Paramount+ (2026–present)
- Sponsor: Monster Energy (2026–present)
- Promotion to: Velocity Tour

The Unleash the Beast Series (UTB) is a professional bull riding tour organized by the Professional Bull Riders (PBR) that acts as the organization's premier series. The top 40 riders and top bulls compete at each event. The UTB series includes 24 events across the United States each year. UTB events range from one to three days, with all 40 riders competing in the long rounds, then the top 12 returning to the Championship Round to determine the event winner. The series culminates at the PBR World Finals at the end of the regular season.

== Schedule ==
From 2015 through 2021, four regular-season Premier Series events were Majors. These events offered competition in different formats, bonus bulls, and more prize money.

The first major event of the year was the Buck Off at the Garden at Madison Square Garden in New York, New York.

Next came the Iron Cowboy, which took place at AT&T Stadium in Arlington, Texas, from 2010 through 2018, before moving to the Staples Center in Los Angeles, California, in 2019.

The third Major of the year was the Last Cowboy Standing, which took place in Las Vegas, Nevada, from 2011 through 2018, with the exception of the one-off year in 2012 when the event was held at Ford Field in Detroit, Michigan. It was held in different venues the years it was in Las Vegas; in 2011, 2013 and 2014, it was held at the Mandalay Bay Events Center. From 2015 through 2017, it was held at the Las Vegas Village, with the latter two years in conjunction with the Helldorado Days rodeo. As a result of the 2017 Route 91 Harvest shooting, the Las Vegas Village was permanently closed. This caused the Last Cowboy Standing and Helldorado Days to change venues in 2018. That year, they were held at the Thomas & Mack Center, the home of the PBR World Finals from 1999 through 2015. In July 2019, the Last Cowboy Standing found a new home at Cheyenne Frontier Days in Cheyenne, Wyoming. In 2020, Cheyenne Frontier Days was cancelled for the first time in its 124-year history due to the COVID-19 pandemic. It ultimately affected the Last Cowboy Standing as well. Cheyenne Frontier Days returned in 2021, as did the Last Cowboy Standing.

The last major event of the season was the Music City Knockout, which took place at Bridgestone Arena in Nashville, Tennessee. In 2020, this event was cancelled due to COVID-19 restrictions, but returned in 2021.

The PBR did not visit New York City or Los Angeles in 2021 because of COVID-19 restrictions in said locations, and the Iron Cowboy event took place at Dickies Arena in Fort Worth, Texas, that year in the summer instead of its usual run in the winter. The Iron Cowboy was discontinued in the United States after 2021. The UTB series returned to Madison Square Garden in New York City and Crypto.com Arena (formerly Staples Center) in Los Angeles in 2022. Since that year, neither Cheyenne or Nashville are events on the UTB schedule. Nashville is now a stop on the PBR Team Series. In 2022 and 2023, Cheyenne was also a Team Series event, but in 2024, the Last Cowboy Standing returned to Cheyenne; only now as a stop on the PBR's lower-level Challenger Series. In 2025, the Last Cowboy Standing was held in two different locations: the first at Dickies Arena as part of the Fort Worth Stock Show & Rodeo in January and the second at Canvas Stadium in Fort Collins, Colorado, in July. In 2026, The Last Cowboy Standing event at Canvas Stadium in July was discontinued and replaced with PBR Bulls and Beats, a three-day event featuring the Collegiate All-Star Rodeo during the first day, followed by the first event of the PBR Team Series season during the next two days. Each event is followed by a concert performance from a country-music act.

After a two-year hiatus, Majors returned to the Premier Series in 2024. These events included the Buck Off at the Garden at Madison Square Garden in New York, New York; the Wrangler Long Live Cowboys Classic at Golden 1 Center in Sacramento, California; and the Ty Murray Invitational at The Pit in Albuquerque, New Mexico. The Majors concept was discontinued in 2025, but returned the following year. In 2026, there was only one Major in the UTB schedule: PBR Florida State at Doak Campbell Stadium in Tallahassee, Florida.

The 15/15 Bucking Battle was offered at some UTB events. This bonus round matched the top 15 bull riders against the top 15 bulls in attendance. The matching was random. There was a separate purse for this round. Points were earned at the rate of 1 and 1/2 times the round points. Points did not factor into the event winner, but did count toward the UTB standings. The winner was the bull rider with the highest ride score. 15/15 Bucking Battles were broadcast on CBS. They debuted in 2012 and lasted through 2024. They were replaced by the Monster Energy Team Challenge in 2025.

Qualifying for the PBR World Finals used to be based on points earned at all of the PBR's tours, which included the UTB elite tour, mid-level (Velocity Tour), and entry level (Touring Touring Division) tour, and International tours. International tours include Australia, Brazil, and Canada. However, since 2023, only points won on the UTB series count towards the PBR World Finals and world championship race. Mexico also had a PBR tour, but the COVID-19 pandemic and financial struggles were major factors that led to its eventual shutdown in 2023

The top 40 riders in the UTB standings according to points earned, the Velocity Tour champion, the top three point earners in the Velocity Tour after the conclusion of its finals event, and the highest ranked finishing international rider not already ranked inside the top 35 of the UTB standings all compete at the World Finals.

Since 2022, the PBR World Finals are held in the Dallas–Fort Worth metroplex. The event's prize money is worth $3.13 million since 2024. This includes the $1 million bonus to the World Champion, who also receives a trophy cup and championship gold belt buckle. The latter of which the value increased from $10,000 to $20,000 in 2018.

== Marketing ==
Monster Beverage Corporation is the current series sponsor for the premiership since 2018. From its founding in 1994 through 2002, it was sponsored by Anheuser-Busch (Bud Light Cup Series), and Ford Motor Company (Built Ford Tough Series) from 2003 through 2017.

== Television ==
The UTB series was televised on CBS Sports Network from January 2018 through May 2024. It was also televised on TUDN and streamed on Vix Premium, both in Spanish, in 2024. From November 2024 through May 2025, it was available for free on the PBR's YouTube channel, RidePass on Pluto TV, and the PBR's mobile app. As of 2026, it is streamed exclusively on Paramount+.

== Inaugural season (2018) ==
Monster Beverage Corporation took over sponsorship of the PBR's Premier Series, replacing Ford Motor Company, including the new title of the Unleash the Beast Series.

== 2020 season changes ==
In March 2020, due to the COVID-19 pandemic, numerous stops on the PBR schedule were either cancelled or rescheduled to later dates. In the spring in the United States, the PBR held events that were closed to the public, but in the summer, events were allowed to have limited and socially distanced crowds. The PBR's international tours in Canada and Australia were cleared to return later that year with similar rules for attendance, but there were no PBR events in Mexico and Brazil that year due to said countries' restrictions on large events.

The PBR World Finals was moved from its usual location at T-Mobile Arena in Las Vegas because of Nevada state restrictions on large events to AT&T Stadium in Arlington, Texas. The World Finals consisted of a limited and socially distanced audience throughout the event. The event's format changed to where all the top 35 point-earners, the Velocity Tour Champion, the top-three finishers from the Velocity Tour Finals, and the top finishing international invitee competed in the first three rounds. Only the top 30 riders based on total points returned for the fourth round. The top 15 riders after four rounds advanced to the Championship Round.

== 2021 season changes ==
The number of riders who qualified for the Championship Round at Unleash the Beast Series events was cut from 15 to 12.

The PBR World Finals returned to T-Mobile Arena in Las Vegas in 2021 and had an event format similar to the one from 2020. All contestants rode in Rounds 1 through 3, then the top 30 point earners in the event advanced to Round 4. The top 12 riders then competed in the Championship Round. This was the final season where the World Finals took place in Las Vegas.

== 2022 season changes ==
In the past, the Premier Series schedule consisted of events taking place throughout the regular calendar year with the concluding PBR World Finals taking place in the autumn. But in 2022, the season was shortened, taking place from winter to spring. All subsequent Premier Series seasons now run like this.

The PBR World Finals moved from its longtime home in Las Vegas, Nevada, to Dickies Arena in Fort Worth, Texas. Also, the event's format changed to a previous one that was used from 2004 through 2009. The World Finals was again an eight-round event split into two weekends where the first three rounds took place the first weekend, then the next five rounds took place the following weekend.

The cut rules were changed for the 2022 World Finals. Previously, all riders participated in the first seven rounds before the cut based on the 15 highest-scoring riders based on the combined score of the first seven rounds participated in the Championship Round. Starting in 2022, a two-tiered cut was imposed. The first cut, at the end of the sixth round, eliminated riders who failed to make a qualified ride. The second cut, at the end of the seventh round, was the top twelve riders in cumulative score who advance to the Championship Round.

== 2023 season changes ==
The number of riders on the Premier Series was increased from 35 to 40; the last time there were 40 riders in the Premier Series regular season was during the first five events of the 2012 season.

Previously, points won by riders on the Premier Series, as well as the PBR's U.S. lower-level tours and international circuits counted for the world standings towards the world championship race. However, by 2023, only points won on the U.S. Premier Series counted towards the world championship race.

From 2015 through 2022, the year-end champion from the U.S. PBR circuit's lower-level Velocity Tour, the top three finishers from the Velocity Tour Finals event, and the invitee rider representing one of PBR's four international circuits from Canada, Mexico, Brazil or Australia that placed the highest at the Velocity Tour Finals received wild-card berths; joining the top 35 riders who earned the most world points during the regular season at the PBR World Finals. In 2023, the rules were changed; the top 35 riders who earned the most points in the U.S. Premier Series (excluding the U.S. lower-level tours, as well as international tours) qualified for the World Finals. As did the Velocity Tour champion and the highest-finishing international invitee at the Velocity Tour Finals. However, instead of the top three finishers from the Velocity Tour Finals, they would now be joined by the top three finishers from the Velocity Global point standings that were not already qualified for the World Finals.

== 2024 season changes ==
The PBR World Finals were now an eight-day event taking place at two different venues in two different cities in the Dallas–Fort Worth metroplex; the first six days being held at Cowtown Coliseum in Fort Worth, then the final two days taking place at AT&T Stadium in Arlington.

The World Finals' format was changed again. There were now ten rounds in eight days in a playoff-style competition:

- The first four Elimination rounds were held at Cowtown Coliseum. The top 40 riders from the UTB standings, as well as the five wild-card riders from the Velocity Tour Finals, each rode one bull per round. After the conclusion of these rounds, the top 15 riders in the UTB standings, as well as the top five finishing riders from the Elimination rounds not already in the top 15 UTB standings, automatically qualified for the Championship rounds. The World Finals then took two days off before resuming.
- The next two Ride for Redemption rounds were also held at Cowtown Coliseum. They featured the 25 riders that did not qualify for the Championship rounds via the Elimination rounds, as well as 15 invited riders. After the conclusion of these rounds, the top five finishing riders from the Redemption rounds moved on to the Championship rounds. The World Finals then took another day off before resuming.
- The final four Championship rounds were held at AT&T Stadium. They took place during the final two days of the World Finals. The final 25 riders competed in two rounds per day; their combined scores from the previous rounds having been wiped clean. The five riders that advanced from the Redemption rounds must have successfully ridden at least one bull in the first two Championship rounds in order to advance to the final two rounds. The rider who earned the most points throughout the Championship rounds was the World Finals event champion. The rider with the most UTB points at the conclusion of the fourth Championship round was the PBR World Champion.

== 2025 season changes ==
Beginning in 2025, the majority of UTB regular-season events include Team Series exhibition games known as the Monster Energy Team Challenge. They consist of two teams competing against each other after the completion of the first round of the regular UTB event. The Monster Energy Team Challenge events are broadcast on CBS. This iteration of the Monster Energy Team Challenge is not to be confused with the identically named Monster Energy Team Challenge from 2020, as the latter was a temporary series of events taking place during the COVID-19 shutdown and the riders were competing against each other as teams represented by some of the PBR's corporate sponsors. The former is a permanent series of events where teams of riders compete against each other while representing different regions of the United States as they do during the Team Series in the summer and autumn since 2022.

In addition to being streamed live on PBR's YouTube channel, RidePass on Pluto TV, and PBR's mobile app, the 2025 World Finals were also televised live on The Cowboy Channel.

== 2026 season changes ==
Beginning in 2026, all qualified rides are now scored on a tenth-point (.1) increment.

The Monster Energy Team Challenge now has four teams (two one-on-one matchups) during the first round of most UTB regular-season events. Also, a season champion for the series is determined beginning this year.

In 2026, the PBR World Finals will take place entirely in Fort Worth, Texas, for the first time since 2023. The first four days will be held at Cowtown Coliseum, then the next four days will be held at Dickies Arena. There will also be a four-day gap between Rounds 4 and 5. The event's format has also changed again; All 45 contestants will compete during the first four rounds. The five wild-card riders from the Velocity Tour Finals must have scored at least one qualified ride to move on to the next four rounds, while the other 40 contestants automatically move on. The top 15 riders based on total points won during the eight long rounds move onto the Championship Round.

== 2027 season changes ==
In 2027, the first four days of the PBR World Finals will remain in Cowtown Coliseum. However, the next four days will now be held at Desert Diamond Arena in Glendale, Arizona. There will also now be an 11-day gap between Rounds 4 and 5.

== Bibliography ==
- 2016 PBR Media Guide (PDF). Professional Bull Riders. 2016. Archived from the original (PDF) on August 13, 2018.
- 2020 PBR Media Guide - PBR Bull Riders and Bulls (PDF). Professional Bull Riders. 2020. Archived from the original (PDF) on July 25, 2021.
- 2020 PBR Media Guide - PBR Tours and World Finals (PDF). Professional Bull Riders. 2020. Archived from the original (PDF) on July 25, 2021.
- 2020 PBR Media Guide - Records and Statistics (PDF). Professional Bull Riders. 2020. Archived from the original (PDF) on July 25, 2021.
- 2020 PBR Media Guide - Belt Buckle (PDF). Professional Bull Riders. 2020. Archived from the original (PDF) on October 8, 2020.
