= Cowtown Coliseum =

Arena in Fort Worth, Texas, US

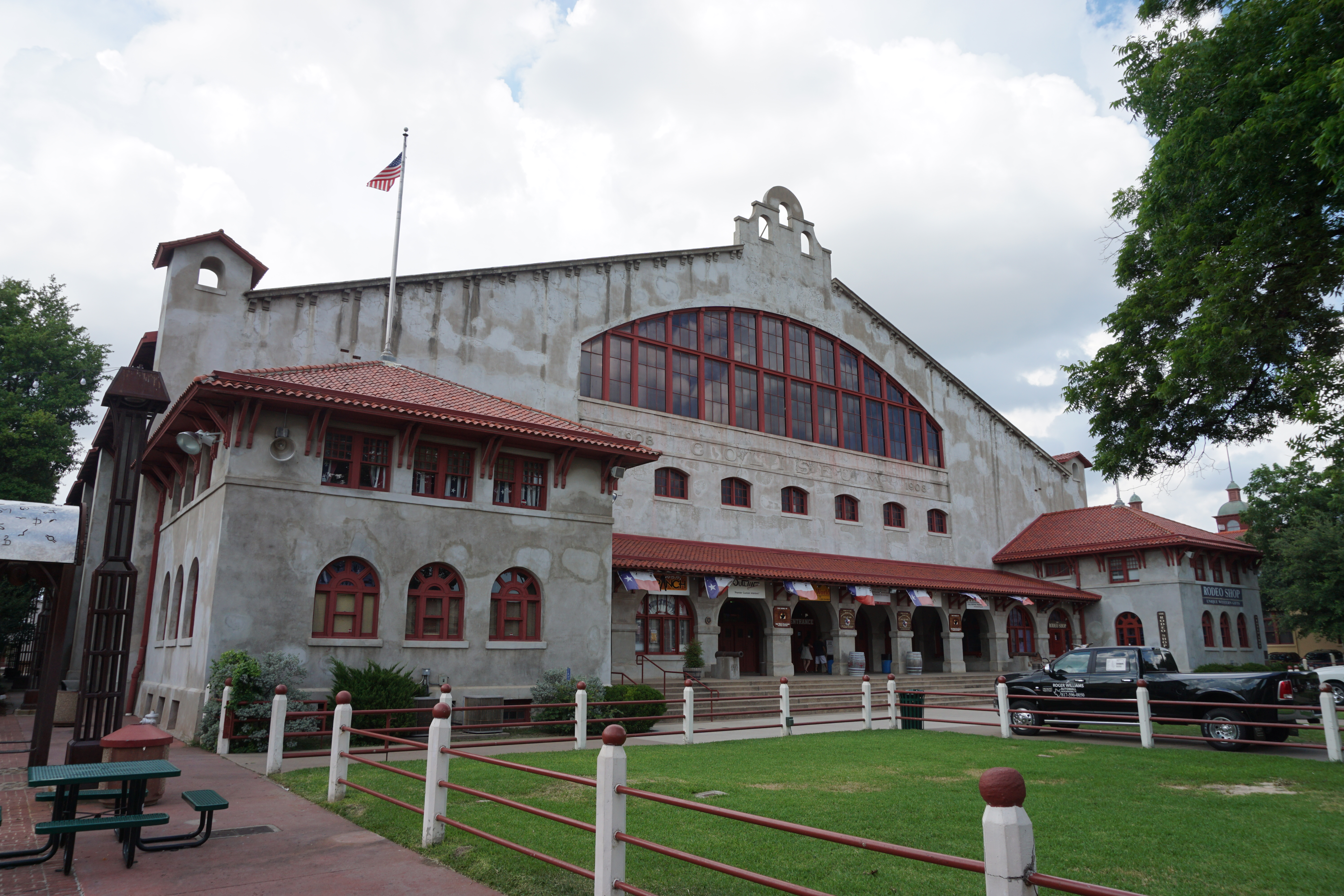
- Interactive map of the Cowtown Coliseum area

General information
- Location: Fort Worth, Texas, United States
- Coordinates: 32.789500°N 97.347740°W
- Current tenants: Professional Bull Riders (2022-present); Ultimate Bullfighters (2023-present)

Website
- https://cowtowncoliseum.com/

Cowtown Coliseum is a 2,400-seat arena in Fort Worth, Texas, United States, that hosts weekly rodeos. It also occasionally hosts concerts and local team sporting events.

The venue was built in 1908 and was originally known as Grand Coliseum. Part of the historic Fort Worth Stockyards, the structure is the first ever indoor arena for rodeos in the United States. The building was refurbished in 1986.

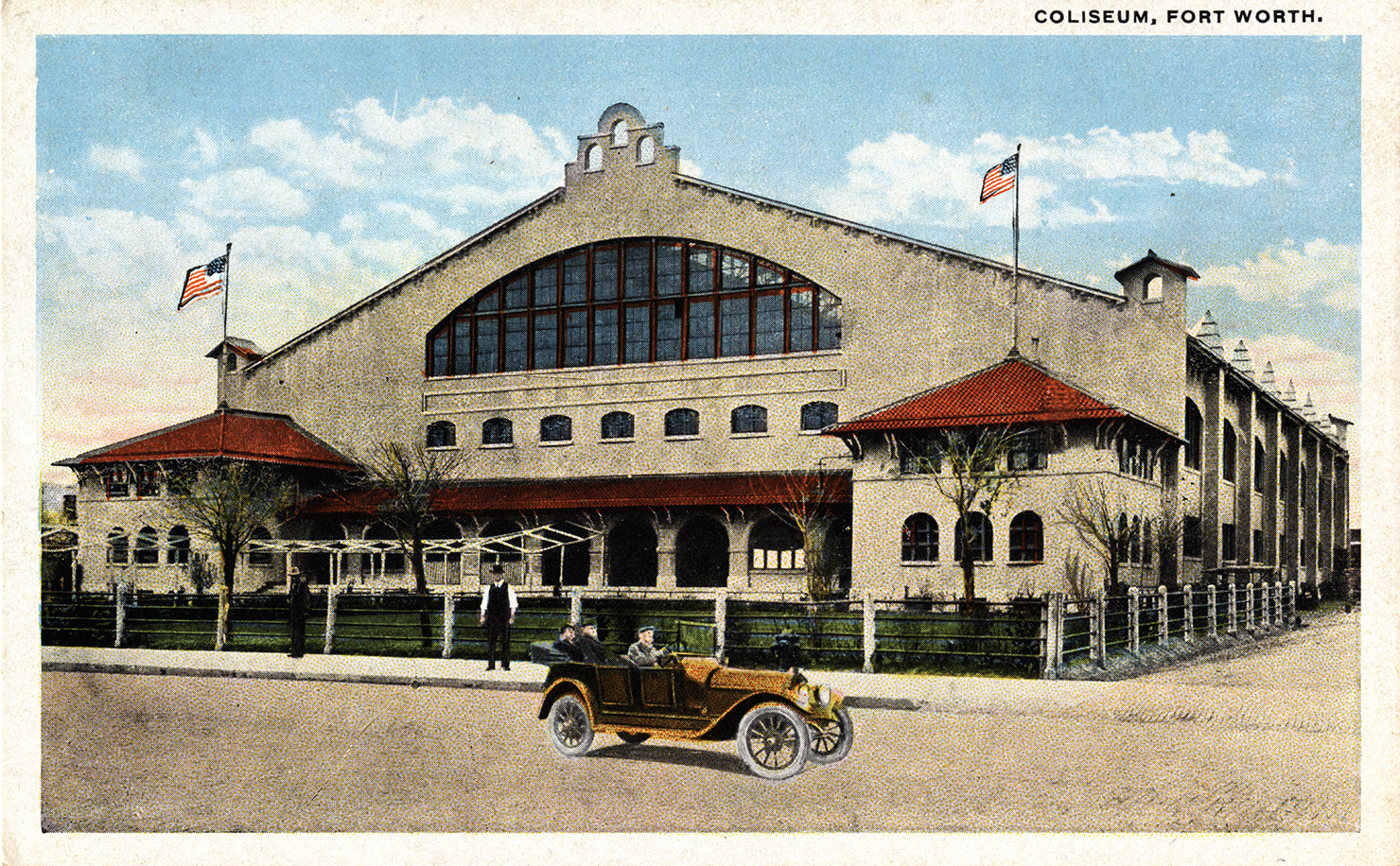
Postcard of Cowtown Coliseum, undated

== Rodeo ==
The Stockyards Championship Rodeo has been held at Cowtown Coliseum almost every Friday and Saturday since 1992. The venue also occasionally holds events sanctioned by the Professional Rodeo Cowboys Association (PRCA), Bill Pickett Invitational Rodeo (BPIR), and Working Ranch Cowboys Association (WRCA). During holiday weekends, the Stockyards Championship Rodeo is also held on Sunday. In the 2010s, the weekly event was sanctioned by the International Professional Rodeo Association (IPRA).

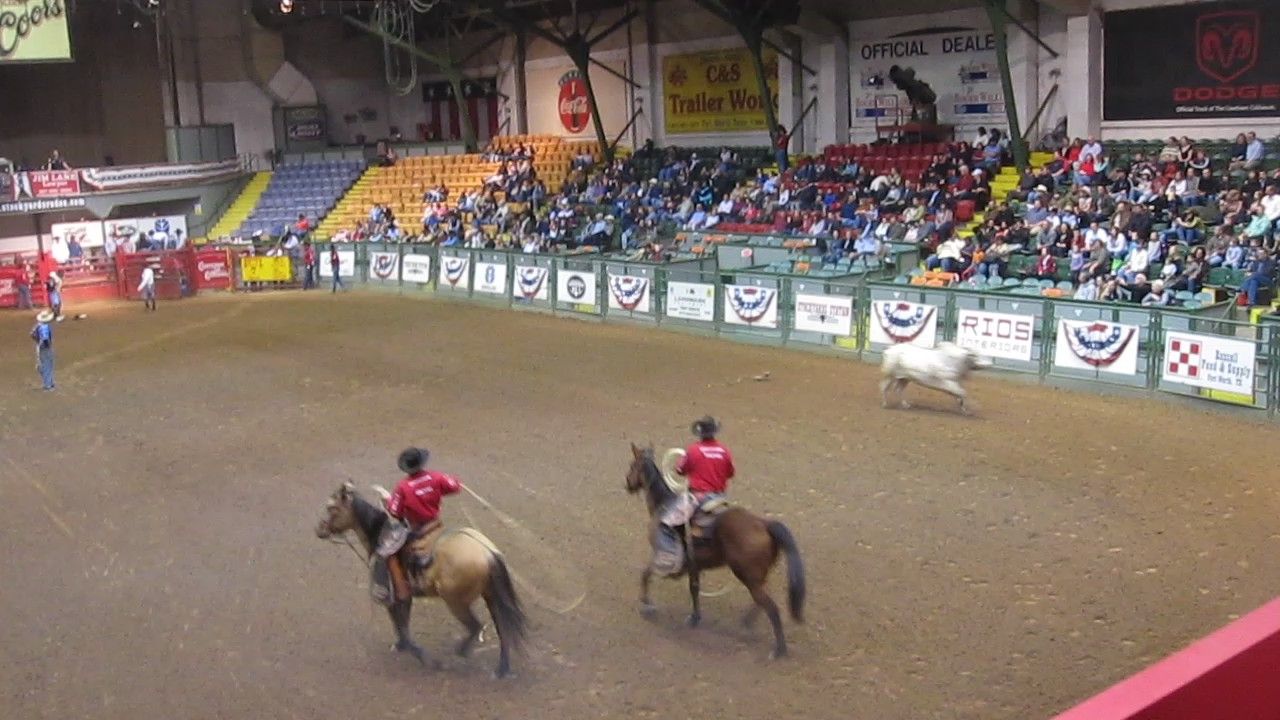
Rodeo in progress at Cowtown Coliseum

The Professional Bull Riders (PBR) held their very first event in April 1993 at Cowtown Coliseum. In late December 1993, the venue was the first stop of the 1994 inaugural season of the PBR's Bud Light Cup Series. In February 2021, the PBR's elite series, now known as the Unleash the Beast Series, returned to Cowtown Coliseum for the first time since 1993 to host an event.

In 2022, the PBR's Challenger Series hosted Sunday events known as PBR Sundays at Cowtown at the venue from June through August.

Since 2023, the PBR hosts Touring Pro Division and Challenger Series events known as Stockyards Showcase at the Coliseum on most Thursdays of the calendar year. PBR Stockyard Showcase events are the kickoff to the Stockyards Championship Rodeo held on Fridays and Saturdays. These bull-riding events were previously held on Fridays and sanctioned by the now-defunct Championship Bull Riding (CBR) organization as part of its Horizon Series in the 2010s.

Since October 2023, after the conclusion of the PBR Stockyards Showcase on Thursday and the Stockyards Championship Rodeo on Friday and Saturday, American freestyle bullfighting sanctioned by the Ultimate Bullfighters (UBF) is held on Sunday. Cowtown Coliseum has been the home of the UBF World Finals every December since 2021.

Every May since 2024, the first half of the PBR World Finals is held at Cowtown Coliseum.

In 2024 and 2025, the finals event for the Bulls, Bands & Barrels (BBB) tour was held at Cowtown Coliseum.

Cowtown Coliseum also houses the Texas Rodeo Cowboy Hall of Fame, as well as the Bull Riding Hall of Fame.

== Other events ==
Two Presidents of the United States have spoken at the Coliseum - Teddy Roosevelt in 1911 and Jimmy Carter in the late 1970s.

Elvis Presley performed there four times from 1955 to 1956 when it was known as North Side Coliseum. Ike & Tina Turner performed at North Side Coliseum in 1966.
