= List of individual bovines =

This is a list of individual bovines by name. This list includes buffalo, cattle, bulls, cows and calves.

== Bison ==
- Black Diamond
- Buddy the Beefalo
- Kenahkihinén
- Mahpiya Ska
- Ralphie the Buffalo

== Buffalo ==
- Donald Trump

== Cattle ==
=== Bulls ===
==== Bucking bulls ====
- Bodacious
- Bones
- Bushwacker
- Bruiser
- Chicken on a Chain
- Code Blue
- Dillinger
- Little Yellow Jacket
- Long John
- Malacrianza
- Mudslinger
- Oscar
- Outlaw
- Rango
- Red Rock
- Red Wolf
- Shepherd Hills Tested
- Pacific Bell
- Spotted Demon
- Tornado
- V-61
- Woopaa

==== Fighting bulls ====
- Got
- Murciélago
- Ratón

==== Other notable bulls ====
- Bevo
- Durham Ox
- Fukutsuru
- Islero
- Karvardi
- Kian
- Shambo
- Toystory

=== Cows ===
- Big Bertha
- Brookview Tony Charity
- Cincinnati Freedom
- Cow 569
- Craven Heifer
- Elm Farm Ollie
- Emily
- Gangotri
- Grady the Cow
- Lily Flagg
- Missy
- Maudine Ormsby
- Rosa
- Shadow Jubilee
- Turra Coo
- Ubre Blanca
- Pauline Wayne
- Veronika
- Yvonne

=== Calves ===
- Calf 269
- Meadow
