= Isaac Stephenson =

American politician (1829–1918)

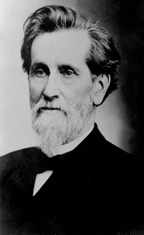

United States Senator from Wisconsin
- In office May 17, 1907 – March 3, 1915
- Preceded by: John C. Spooner
- Succeeded by: Paul O. Husting

Member of the U.S. House of Representatives from Wisconsin's 9th district
- In office March 4, 1883 – March 3, 1889
- Preceded by: District Established
- Succeeded by: Myron H. McCord

Member of the Wisconsin State Assembly
- In office January 6, 1868 – January 4, 1869
- Preceded by: Daniel H. Pulcifer
- Succeeded by: Parlan Semple
- Constituency: Oconto–Shawano
- In office January 1, 1866 – January 7, 1867
- Preceded by: Dennis A. Reed
- Succeeded by: Daniel H. Pulcifer (Oconto–Shawano)
- Constituency: Door–Oconto–Shawano

Personal details
- Born: June 18, 1829 York County, New Brunswick Colony, British Canada
- Died: March 15, 1918 (aged 88) Marinette, Wisconsin, U.S.
- Resting place: Forest Home Cemetery; Milwaukee, Wisconsin
- Party: Republican
- Spouses: Margaret Stephenson; (died 1872); Harriet Augusta Nelson Anderson; (died 1882); Martha Elizabeth Burns; (died 1925)
- Children: with Margaret Stephenson; Margaret E. Stephenson^{(b. 1856; died 1861)}; Samuel J. Stephenson^{(b. 1859–1861)}; Maggie (Hodgins)^{(b. 1861–1935)}; Mary (Brown)^{(b. 1862–1936)}; Ella Jane (George)^{(b. 1864–1908)}; Georgiana (Ludington)^{(b. 1867–1953)}; with Harriet Anderson; Elizabeth M. (Morgan)^{(b. 1876–1933)}; Isaac Watson Stephenson^{(b. 1877–1910)}; Harriet Augusta (Skidmore)^{(b. 1882–1950)}; with Martha Burns; Grant Thomas Stephenson^{(b. 1885–1951)}
- Parents: Isaac Stephenson (father); Elizabeth (Watson) Stephenson (mother)
- Relatives: Samuel M. Stephenson (brother)

Isaac Stephenson (June 18, 1829 – March 15, 1918) was an American businessman, Republican politician, and Wisconsin pioneer. He represented Wisconsin as a U.S Senator from 1907 to 1915 and served three terms in the U.S. House of Representatives (1883–1889). He was an important financial backer of Wisconsin progressive leader Robert M. La Follette in his initial bids for governor. Earlier in his career, he served two terms in the Wisconsin State Assembly, representing the area now comprising Marinette, Oconto, and Shawano Counties.

He was a major employer and philanthropist in early Marinette County, and several places in the county bare his name, including the town of Stephenson, Wisconsin, and the Stephenson Public Library in the city of Marinette.

His younger brother Samuel Merritt Stephenson was a member of the U.S. House of Representatives from Michigan.

== Early life and education ==
He was born in the community of Yorkton, near Fredericton in the Colony of New Brunswick (now in Canada but then a British colony). His parents were Isaac Stephenson (1791–1874), a lumberman and farmer born in Ireland of Scotch-Irish ancestry, and Elizabeth (Watson) Stephenson (1793–1838), who was born in London.

== Lumberman ==
Stephenson worked in lumbering activities in the Eastern United States for several years, principally in Maine, close to Canada. In 1845 he moved to Wisconsin, where, for a time, he managed absentee timber properties, but he soon entered the lumber business for himself.

In 1858, he settled permanently in Marinette, where he steadily expanded his lumbering operations, especially during the Civil War. Although Stephenson suffered heavy losses in the Peshtigo Fire of 1871, he recouped. He was one of the wealthiest lumbermen in the Great Lakes area, with real-estate holdings in Marinette, Green Bay, Milwaukee, the booming town of Chicago, and throughout the Great Lakes. He also owned vast acreages of pine lands in northern Wisconsin and Michigan that were yet to be harvested.

== Political career ==
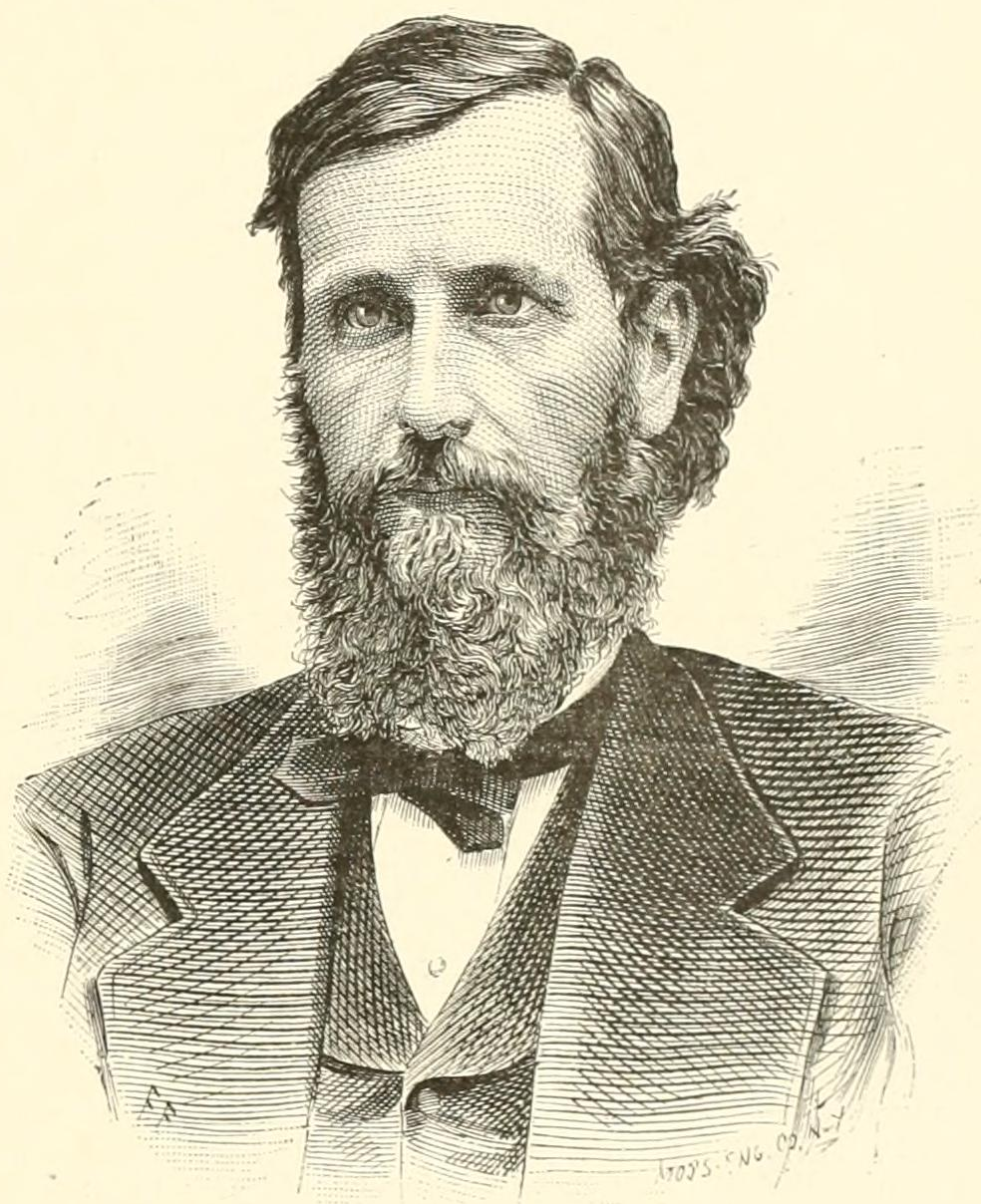
sketch c. 1881

Stephenson joined the Republican Party, which was popular among his class in the northern tier of states. His wealth and economic power made him a powerful figure in local and state politics. He was elected to several offices, including town supervisor, county board chairman, and justice of the peace.

Next, Stephenson was elected as a member of the Wisconsin State Assembly (1866, 1868). In 1882, he was elected to the Forty-Eighth Congress, and then reelected to the Forty-Ninth and Fiftieth Congresses (serving March 4, 1883 – March 3, 1889). He represented Wisconsin's newly-created 9th congressional district. He was not a candidate for re-election in 1888. In 1899, he was unsuccessful in his bid to win election through the state legislature as a U.S. Senator from Wisconsin (as was the process at the time).

== Early Progressive leader ==
In 1900, he threw his support and substantial financial backing behind Robert M. La Follette in his successful campaign for the Wisconsin governorship, and for a number of years, he was a prominent adviser to the Progressive faction of the Republican party, and a liberal contributor to its campaign funds. In the 1904 progressive-stalwart split, Stephenson was chosen by the "gymnasium convention" as one of the Progressive delegates to the Republican national convention along with La Follette and William D. Connor. Although the national convention refused to accept the credentials of the Progressive delegation, the La Follette forces were recognized as the legal Republican ticket by the Wisconsin Supreme Court (1904).

In 1901 Stephenson established the Milwaukee Free Press, providing Progressive-Republicans with a metropolitan newspaper and competition for the Stalwart-controlled Milwaukee Sentinel. In 1907 Stephenson sought the U.S. Senate seat made vacant by the resignation of John C. Spooner and, after a brief deadlock, was elected by the Progressive-controlled state legislature. In 1908, he ran for renomination in the Republican primary. He was opposed by La Follette but won the nomination through the aid of the state chairman of the Republican Party. William D. Connor, and the lavish use of his personal wealth, and he was re-elected by the legislature in 1909. Although his election was twice blocked by fraud investigations in both the state legislature and the U.S. Senate, Stephenson was eventually vindicated and resumed his seat in the Senate, serving from May 1907 to March 1915.

Stephenson holds the distinction of being the oldest elected freshman U.S. Senator; he was 77 when he took office.

Stephenson is the last Class 3 Senator from Wisconsin to have retired. Paul Husting, Stephenson's successor, died in office and every later Senator has been defeated for reelection, either for renomination or in the general election.

== Presidential cow ==
In 1909, Stephenson purchased a prized Holstein cow as a gift for the 27th President of the United States, William Howard Taft. The cow was named Pauline Wayne and she became the last presidential pet cow. Pauline Wayne lived and grazed on the White House lawn.

== Retirement ==
He published his memoir in 1915 titled Recollections of a Long Life. After returning from Washington in 1915, Stephenson retired to his home in Marinette, where he remained until his death on March 15, 1918.

== Legacy ==
Noted for his local philanthropies in Marinette, a park, street, and memorial library are named in his honor. The town of Stephenson, Wisconsin, is also named in his honor.

His younger brother, Samuel Merritt Stephenson, served as a U.S. Representative from Michigan.

== See also ==
- List of United States senators born outside the United States

U.S. House of Representatives
Preceded by New district	Member of the U.S. House of Representatives from Wisconsin's 9th congressional district March 4, 1883 – March 3, 1889	Succeeded by Myron H. McCord
U.S. Senate
Preceded by John Coit Spooner	U.S. Senator (Class 3) from Wisconsin; 1907 – 1915; Served alongside: Robert M. La Follette Sr.	Succeeded by Paul O. Husting
