= Pachabdi Gazi =

Tiger hunter from Bengal (d. 1997)

Abdul Hamid Gazi (1924 – 1997), famously known as Pachabdi Gazi, was a renowned tiger hunter who lived and worked in the region historically referred to as Bengal in the Indian subcontinent. He reportedly killed 57 tigers, many of them man-eaters, highest on record in the Sundarbans, the region of world's largest mangrove forests and notorious for deadly tiger attacks.

== Early life ==
Gazi was born in 1924 in the village of Shara in Gabura Union on the banks of the Kholpetua River, in then Khulna District (now Satkhira District) of Bengal Presidency in British India. He was born into a family with a history of hunting. His father, Meher Gazi, was also a notable hunter who had reportedly killed fifty tigers, and his grandfather, Kinu Sheikh, took the surname Gazi once he took up tiger hunting. Reportedly, Gazi inherited a muzzle-loading James Purdey & Sons percussion cap double-barreled shotgun from his father, and was later gifted a Remington Model 1889 10-gauge side-by-side shotgun by American hunters in 1936.

== Career ==
Gazi initially wanted to be a honey harvester. However, he ended up killing his first bengal tiger in 1941 when he was just 17, in the Paikgachha Upazila of Khulna District. It was a man-eating tiger then known as the Terror of Golkhali. Gazi began working with the Forest Department with support from Divisional Forest Officer (DFO) Abdul Alim. He used varied methods to hunt tigers, and was known for his excellent knowledge of the tiger's behaviour in the wilderness of regional forests. He was highly respected by boatmen, fishermen, honey collectors, and others working in the forests who were susceptible to tiger attacks. He was often employed by the government to hunt man-eating tigers, even after tiger-hunting had been banned in 1972. Gazi also captured the two tiger cubs in 1974 which were presented to Bangabandhu Sheikh Mujibur Rahman who gifted them to the Dhaka Zoo.

Gazi's skills and fame meant that the government called on him to guide or assist many high profile visitors to the Sundarbans area, namely, President Ayub Khan, Governor Abdul Monem Khan, King Mahendra of Nepal, and many other foreign diplomats, journalists, etc. He was gifted a Belgian Raick Frères 12-bore double-barreled hammer shotgun in 1961 by the President. He was also awarded Tamgha-i-Khidmat in 1968 by the Government of Pakistan (then ruling eastern Bengal as East Pakistan). In his career, he is estimated to have killed 57-61 bengal tigers including, per some reports, a 12 feet long specimen. His last kill was on 20 January 1987, a man-eater known as the Terror of Talpatti.

== Death and legacy ==
Gazi died of natural causes on 12 October 1997 in modern day Bangladesh.

Dr. Humayun Khan, former director of the Dacca Public Library, co-authored his biography in 1980 which was re-published as Sundarbaner Shikari (ISBN 978-9-8499-8373-6) in 2025. He is mentioned in the book Man-eaters of Sunderbans (ISBN 979-8-2234-7439-5) by Tahawar Ali Khan, and in the book Sundarbaner Itihas (ISBN 978-9-8411-0696-6) by A.F.M. Abdul Jalil. The book Eighteen Tides And A Tiger (ISBN 978-8-1799-3649-8) by Anjana Basu has a tiger-hunter named Pachabdi Gazi after him.
