= Tiger hunting =

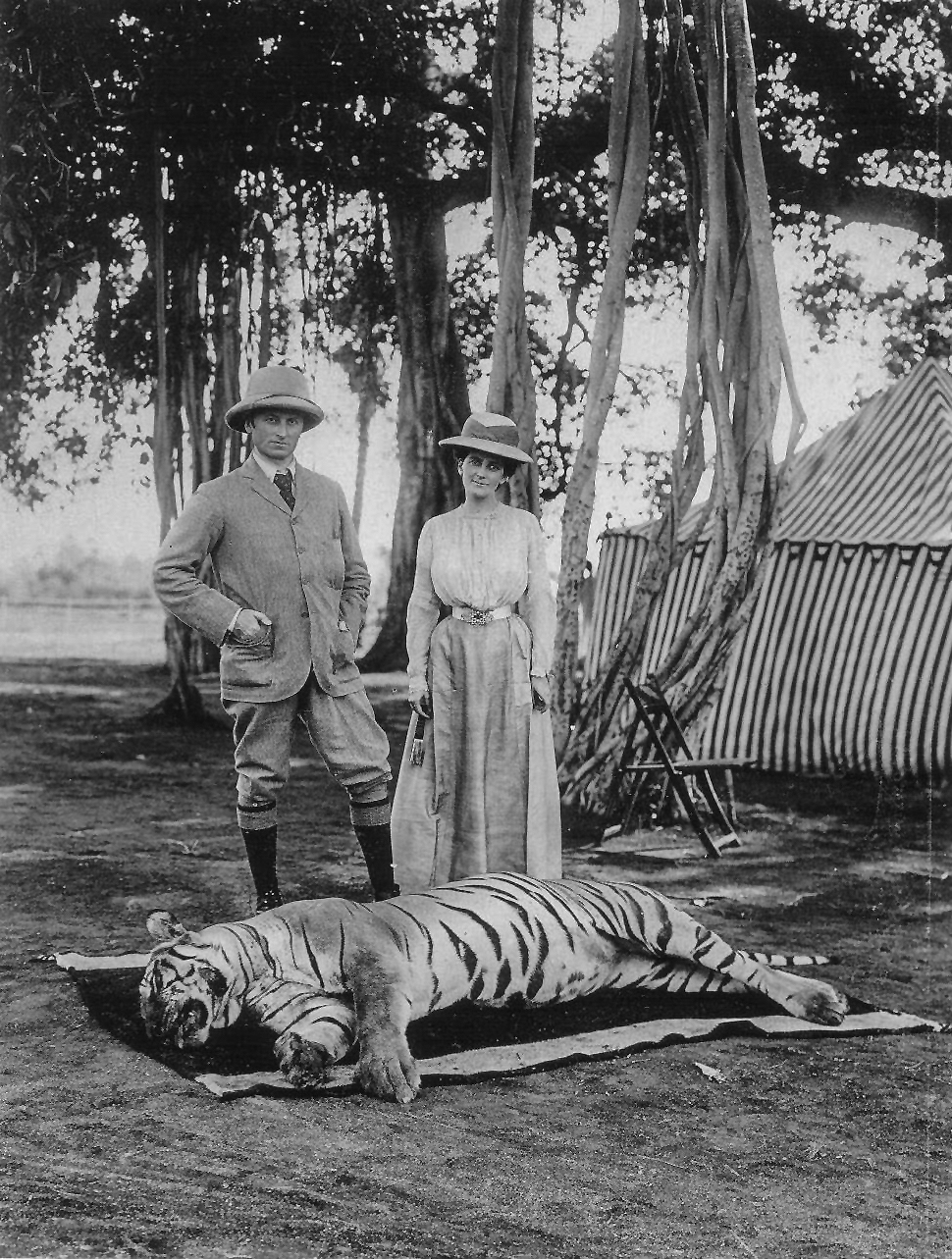
Tiger hunting by George Curzon, 1st Marquess Curzon of Kedleston, and his wife Mary in British India, 1903.

Tiger hunting is the capture and killing of tigers. Humans are the tigers' most significant predator, and illegal poaching is a major threat to the tigers. The Bengal tiger is the most common subspecies of tiger, constituting approximately 80% of the entire tiger population in Indian Sub-Continent, and is endemic to Bangladesh, Bhutan, Myanmar, Nepal, and India. Tigers have mythological, cultural and religious significance in these countries. Foreign big game hunters saw hunting of tigers as a symbol of masculinity and an adventurous sporting event. It has been hunted in these countries for centuries. In 1924, the tiger population in Asia was estimated to be more than 100,000. However, within less than a hundred years, it had declined to fewer than 3,200. Tigers have historically been a popular big game animal and has been hunted for prestige as well as for taking trophies. Extensive poaching has continued even after such hunting became illegal and legal protection was provided to the tiger. Now a conservation-reliant endangered species, the majority of the world's tigers live in captivity. Tigers were once considered to be harder to hunt than lions, due to their habit of living alone in dense cover and not noisily asserting their presence with roars as often.

== History ==
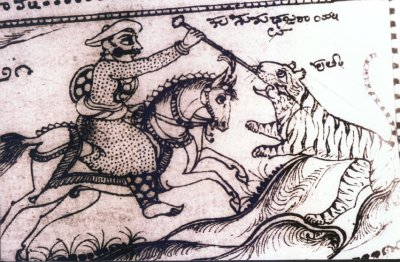
Historical tiger hunting in India, c. 1821.

Historically, tigers have been hunted on foot, horseback, elephant-back, and from machans. Any of these involved considerable danger and the hunting of a tiger had been considered a manly and a courageous feat with game, trophies being collected as the symbols of valor and prestige. Accounts of British royalty photographed aside dead tiger carcasses during the late 19th and early 20th centuries depict the construction of the successful conquest of Indian nature, thus symbolizing the imperial, masculine identities desired by the British. In some places such as China, tigers were also perceived to be a threat to human life in the area, so those who managed to kill them were hailed as heroes to the general public.

In 1986, it was discovered that tigers were declining rapidly due to being poisoned, snared or shot and then smuggled out of India to supply medicinal manufacturers in China. By 1992, the trade industry paid a total of $12.4 million for 200 tigers that were harvested by poachers. Since that time, the Chinese have banned poaching and the tiger part trade. However, this has only increased the value of poached tigers. Individual poachers now get approximately $800 per tiger, but those associated with well-known established gangs can receive up to $5,000 per body received. In addition to poaching, to compensate for the banning of trade in tiger parts, China has begun harvesting tigers by means of "tiger farming." This enables them to breed captive tigers for the purpose of selling their parts.

=== India ===
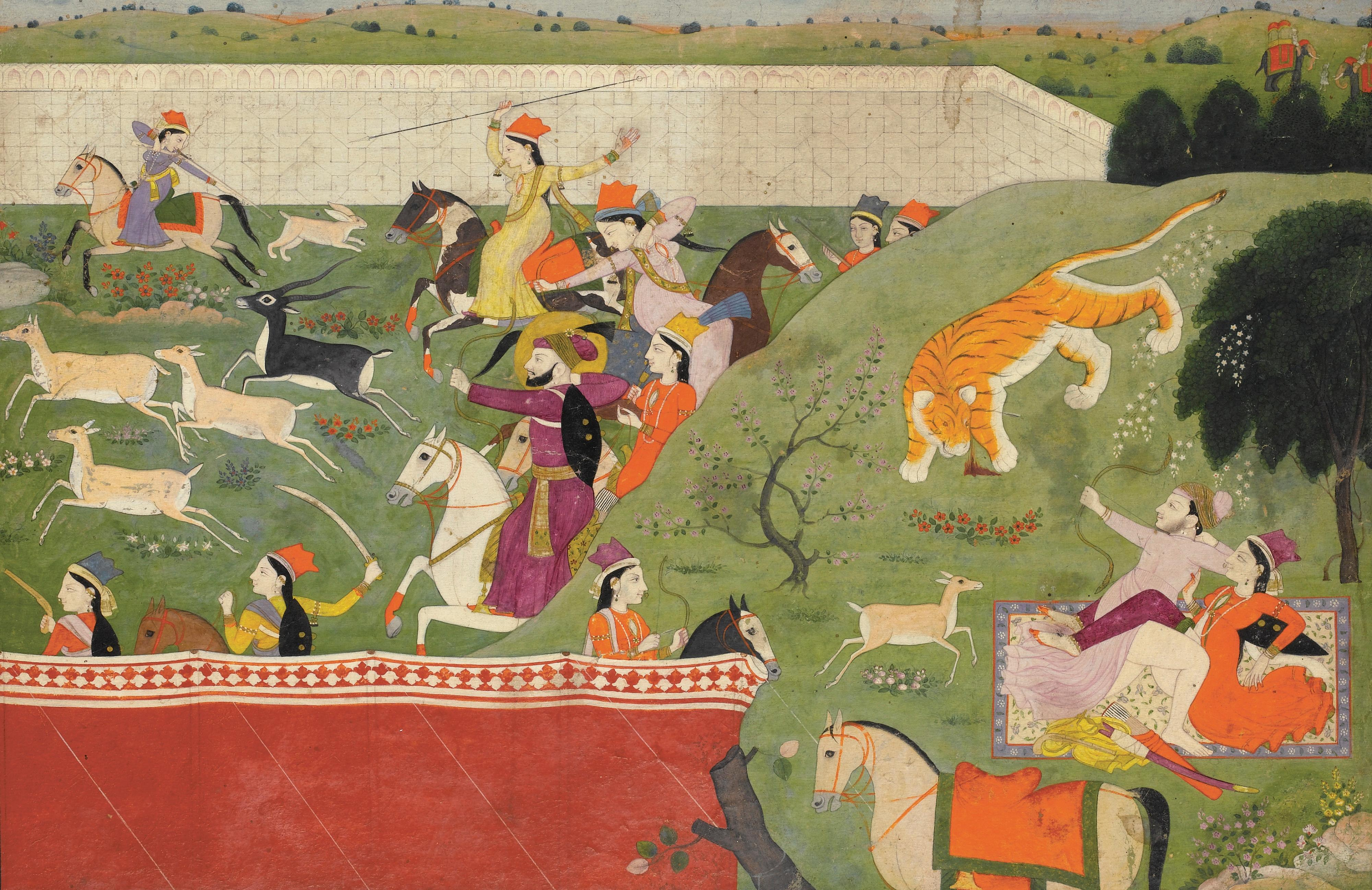
'Ala'ud-Din and Mahima Dharma hunting a tiger for entertainment while in an intimate relationship, Punjab, South Asia, 1790

From time immemorial, humans and tigers have co-existed throughout the Indian subcontinent. In fact, tigers were revered and worshiped in the forests and grasslands it shared with people throughout the region. While the tigers in India were widely extant and not threatened up to the first decades of the twentieth century, hunting and habitat loss reduced their population in India from 40,000 to less than 1,800 in a mere hundred years. Despite the prevalence of tiger hunting as a royal sport for centuries, the consequences were larger during the British Raj due to the hunters' use of far superior firepower, and their interest to hunt shared by a much larger number of colonial aristocrats led to further depletion. Hunting events were chronicled in detail by the British officers in their personal diaries, memoirs, official gazetteers and their photographs, with successful tiger hunts being seen as a symbol of the successful conquest of nature by civilised, manly Britons. British rulers enacted Forest Act of 1878 which enabled them to treat forest area as hunting grounds. British officially killed 1,579 tigers in the year 1878. In 1882, the British officials paid £4800 in rewards for killing 1,726 tigers. Maharaja of Surguja killed 1,710 tigers in his hunting quests. George Yule, a British civil servant in Bengal Presidency had killed more than 400 tigers during his administration. Duke of Windsor shot 17 tigers in one week in 1921 King George V on his visit to Colonial India in 1911 killed 39 tigers in a matter of 10 days One of these is on display at the Royal Albert Memorial Museum.

As of 2022, India contains 75 percent of the global tiger population.

=== Tsarist Russia ===
In the first years of the 20th century, the Imperial Russian government began a plan to colonise the Central Asiatic lands inhabited by the Caspian tiger. The Russian local authorities worked heavily to exterminate tigers during a huge land reclamation program in areas such as the Syr-Daria and Amu-Daria rivers and the Aral Sea. The Russian army was instructed to exterminate all tigers found around the area of the Caspian Sea, a project that was carried out very efficiently. Once the extermination of the Caspian tiger was almost complete, the farmers followed, clearing forests and planting crops. Due to intensive hunting and deforestation, the Caspian tiger retreated first from the lush lowlands to the forested ranges, then to the marshes around some of the larger rivers, and finally, deeper into the mountains, until it almost certainly became extinct. The last stronghold of the Caspian tiger in the former Soviet Union was in the Tigrovaya Balka area, in Tajikistan. Though the tigers were reported as being found here until the mid-1950s, the reliability of these claims is unknown.

=== Soviet Union ===
In the early years of the Russian Civil War, both Red and White armies based in Vladivostok nearly wiped out the local Siberian tigers. In the 1920s, tigers were heavily persecuted by the Communists, who would on occasion bag up to eight or ten on a single outing. Legal tiger hunting within the Soviet Union would continue until 1947, when it was officially prohibited.

=== People's Republic of China ===
In 1959, during the PRC's Great Leap Forward, Mao Zedong declared South China tigers as enemies of man, and began organizing and encouraging eradication campaigns. By the early 1960s, Chinese tigers had been reduced to just over 1,000 animals. A decade later, their range was reduced to three regions in southern China, two of which were located in the Jiangxi Province.

== Tigers in traditional Chinese medicine ==
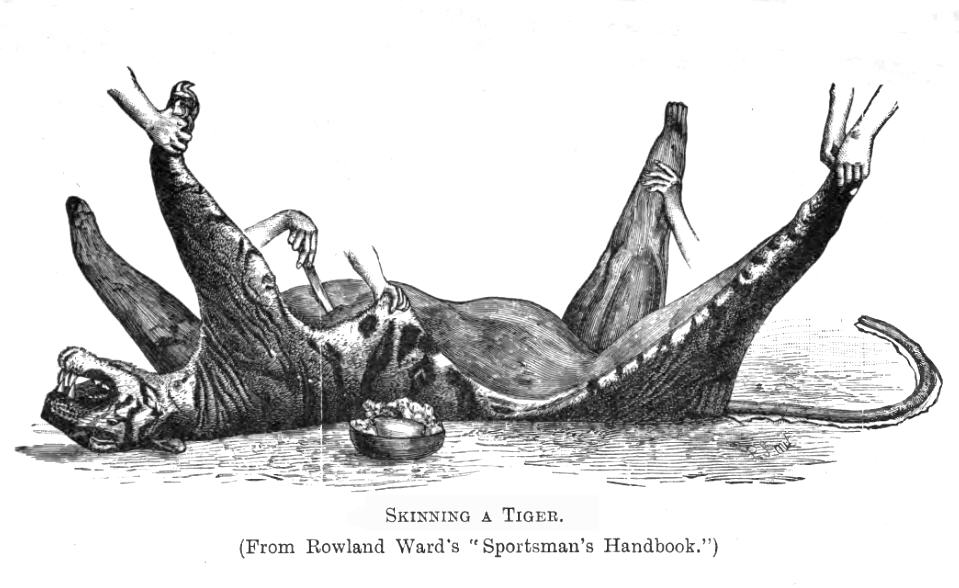
Instructions for tiger skinning

Tiger bones and nearly all body parts are used in traditional Chinese medicine for a range of purported uses, including pain killers. When combined with the high prices that furs fetch on the black market and destruction of habitat, poaching for medicinal uses has greatly reduced tiger populations in the wild. A century ago, it is estimated that there were over 100,000 tigers in the world; now, global numbers may be below 2,500 mature breeding individuals, with no subpopulation containing more than 250 mature breeding individuals. There is no scientific corroboration to these beliefs, which include:

- The tail of the tiger is sometimes ground and mixed with soap to create an ointment for use in treating skin cancer.
- The bones found in the tip of the tiger's tail are said to ward off evil spirits.
- Crushed tiger bones added to wine, served as a Taiwanese general tonic.
- The feet of a tiger, when dipped in palm oil and hung in front of a door, are said to diminish the likelihood of evil spirits from entering.
- Tiger's skin is said to cure a fever caused by ghosts. To use it effectively, the user must sit on the tiger's skin, but beware. If too much time is spent on the tiger's skin, legend says the user will become a tiger.
- Adding honey to the gallstones and applying the combination to the hands and feet is said to effectively treat abscesses.
- Burnt tiger hair can allegedly drive away centipedes.
- Mixing the brain of a tiger with oil and rubbing the mixture on your body is an alleged cure for both laziness and acne.
- Rolling the eyeballs into pills is an alleged remedy for convulsions.
- The whiskers are used to cure toothaches.
- One will allegedly possess courage and shall be protected from sudden fright by wearing a tiger's claw as a piece of jewellery or carrying one in a pocket.
- Strength, cunning, and courage can allegedly be obtained by consuming a tiger's heart.
- Floating ribs of a tiger are considered a good luck talisman.
- The tiger's penis is said to be an aphrodisiac.
- Small bones in a tiger's feet tied to a child's wrists are said to be a sure cure for convulsions.

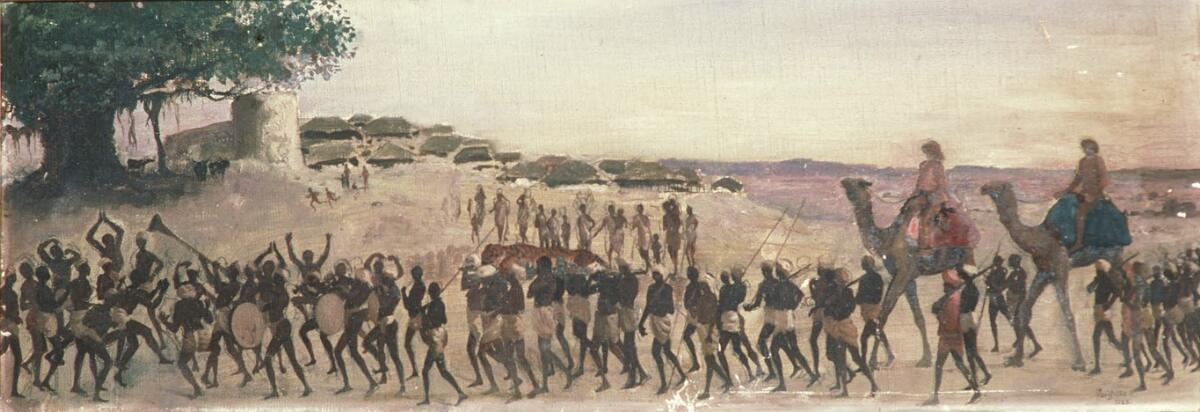
Tiger shooting in Berar

On 15 March 2010, the World Federation of Chinese Medicine Societies (WFCMS) issued a statement regarding the use of endangered species for medicinal purposes. Huang Jianyin, Deputy Secretary of WFCMS, addressing the conference, issued the following statement: "Tiger conservation has become a political issue in the world. Therefore it is necessary for the traditional Chinese medicine industry to support the conservation of endangered species, including tigers". As TCM practitioners push to remove endangered species from the "ingredients list," they are being met by farmers hoping to reignite the demand for TCM-based medicinal products, such as Tiger Bone Wine.

Tiger farming is partially, if not fully, responsible for reigniting the demand for tiger-based medicinal products. At Xiongsen bear and tiger farm in Guilin, China, as many as 200,000 bottles of tiger bone wine are being produced annually. (Jacobs 2010) Parks such as Xiongsen profit off branding their wine as holistic medicinal remedies, meeting the market demand for prior medicinal practices. While TCM practitioners attempt to move away from the use of endangered species, tiger farms are reigniting this demand. Today, tiger farmers in China are pushing their government to lift the ban on tiger part sales.

In 2007, farmers fought to have the ban lifted, citing that, "[t]he poaching of wild tigers for traditional medicine would diminish substantially if tigers, which breed prolifically in captivity – could be farmed for food." However, this goes directly against the reasons for which these establishments were created – for reintroducing the endangered species back into the wild. If tiger farming is allowed, the population of wild tigers will be directly affected. One of the first noticeable factors will be the growth in demand for a natural product (wild vs captive bred). The consequence of ignoring these dire issues will be detrimental to the population of tigers. Most alarmingly, it is projected that within the next decade, the species of tigers may go extinct. "James Leape, director general of the World Wildlife Fund, told the meeting in St. Petersburg that if the proper protective measures aren't taken, tigers may disappear by 2022, the next Chinese calendar year of the tiger." (Titova 2010)

== Hunting and poaching ==
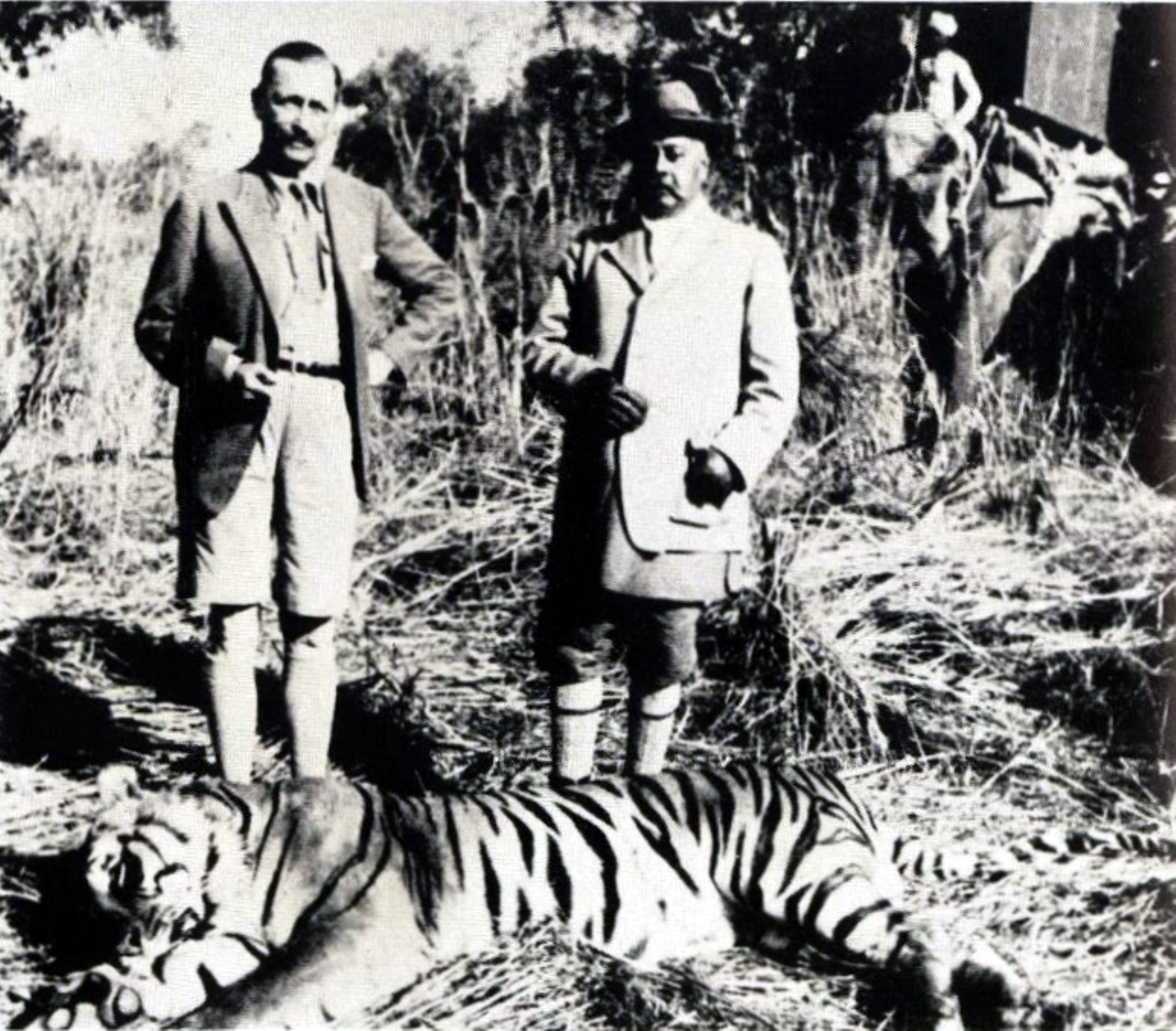
Carl Gustaf Emil Mannerheim and Juddha Shumsher Jung Bahadur Rana with a killed tiger, 1937

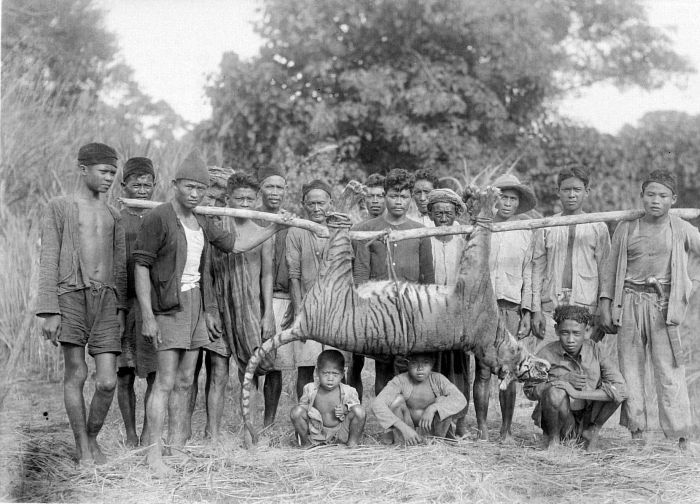
A group of men poses with a killed Javan tiger, 1941

The wild tiger is one of the most threatened species on the planet. The main factors behind the endangerment of tigers are spurred by humans, due to demand, customary beliefs, ritual practices of/and increasing number of populations clashing and tampering with the original boundaries and dwelling zones of this wild animal. In some middle eastern countries tiger parts are believed to heal the liver and kidneys and are used to treat epilepsy, baldness, inflammation, possession by evil demons, toothaches, malaria, hydrophobia, skin diseases, nightmares, laziness, fevers, and headaches. Although tiger populations are mostly impacted by habitat degradation and diminution in prey density. Wang and Shen 2010 explain that factors that best explain diminishing population of tiger species are human population density and distance from roads. However, hunting activities and poaching contribute greatly to the declines of this animal. Illegal trade circulating products from tiger parts is another of the major causes of extinction of the Javan, Caspian and Bali tiger subspecies (WWF 2010).

A well-respected report "Traffic: The wildlife trade monitoring network" has released numbers on animals killed and traded for parts and products. "One thousand tigers were killed and traded for their parts and products in the last decade." The Malayan species of tiger has about 600 to 800 in the wild, making it the third largest sub-species. It is one of the most portrayed, which appears on the Malaysian coat of arms. The Bali tiger has already become extinct due to hunting. It was the smallest of the tiger family with an approximate weight of 90–100 kg in males and 65–80 kg in females.

As the Russian economy has declined, laws and regulations against poaching became looser and less enforced, which has favoured the hunting and poaching of tigers to improve market conditions and economy (Washington Post, 2010). The degree to which poaching and hunting is practised is such that very rarely do Siberian tigers die of old age, since they are killed before they are allowed to reach this stage.

In recognition of these times of struggle for the survival of the tiger, Russian Prime minister Vladimir Putin has put forth an effort to bring people together in awareness of this occurrence in the city of St. Petersburg. The name of the event is called the "Tiger Summit" an international forum to rescue tigers from the brink of extinction. The year 2010 was the Chinese year of the tiger, which made the year a natural focus of international conservation efforts. Tiger experts fear that tigers are in jeopardy of extinction due to current threats (Traffic 2010). Prolonging their existence will take a very high level of commitment from multiple countries. Experts agree that efforts to conserve habitat are essential. For example, an evaluation of conservation strategies to preserve species of tigers in North-eastern China reveal the importance of enlarging suitable habitats for conservation and survival (Xiaofeng, 2009). Key landscapes must be tiger-conservation friendly to ensure ecosystem integrity that is equally valuable for humans, tigers and many other wildlife species sharing the same area. In July 2014 at an international convention on endangered species in Geneva, Switzerland, a Chinese representative admitted for the first time his government was aware trading in tiger skins was occurring in China.

== Methods ==
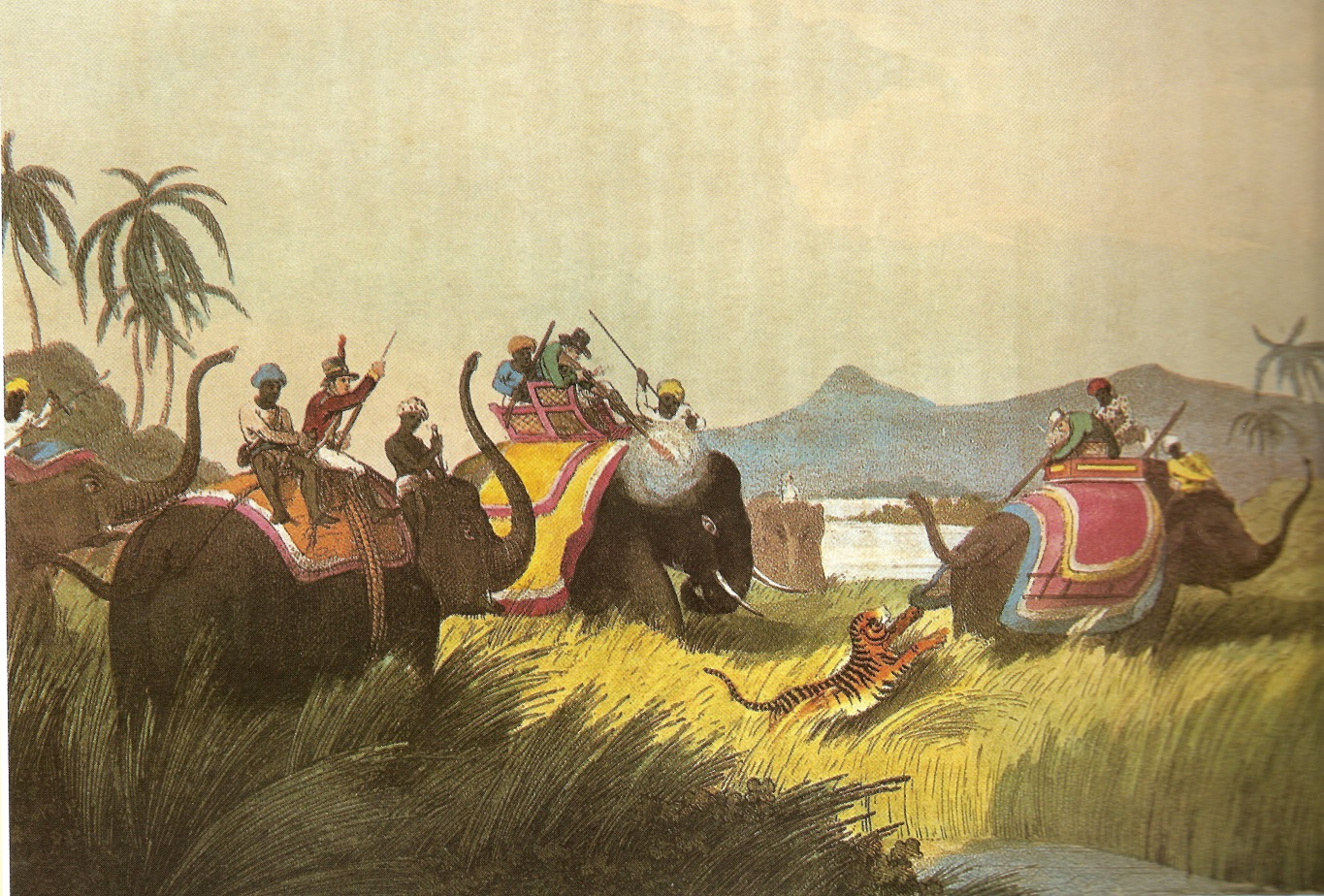
Tiger hunting on elephant-back

=== Baiting ===
Baiting consisted of watching for a tiger over the carcass of some animal, domestic or wild, which it had previously killed. The tiger would usually come to its kill in the evening, making the vicinity resound with its loud roars. While there was no danger to the hunter as long as he sat up in the tree, it was dangerous for him to attempt to return home during the night. The hunter would thus have to remain in the tree till morning. In China, small bombs known as pen-tras were placed in a tiger's kill, and would detonate upon ingestion.

=== Bird lime ===
In Burma and in India, a concoction of mustard oil and latex was strewn around a water hole frequented by a tiger. In an attempt to rid its paws of the sticky fluid with its tongue or teeth, the tiger would involuntarily cover its face with dirt and leaves. The resulting blindness made it easier for it to be brought down.

=== Hunquah ===
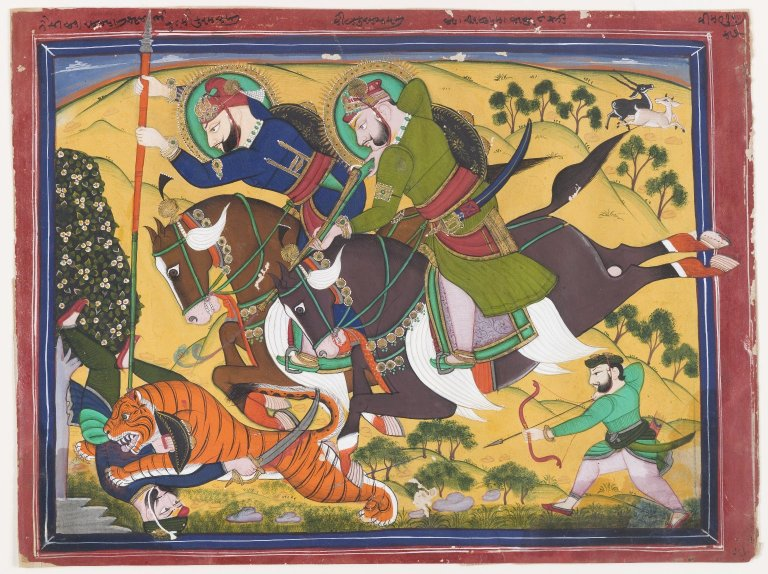
Maharaja Ram Singh hunting a tiger

Hunqua was the rajah's practise in Bengal of reducing the numbers of tigers by setting fire to grass ten or twenty miles around one jungle in such a manner that beaters could drive the fleeing animals into a mile of netting.

=== Impalement ===
In upper Irrawaddy, when a bamboo bridge was seen to be used by tigers, the slats of the bridge would be adjusted, so that on its next crossing, the tiger would fall onto sharpened poles at the bottom. In Madhya Pradesh, the Baigas would hang a tiger's kill from the middle of a horizontal pole supported in two forked trees a few feet apart. Because the pole was slippery and had no bark, the tiger would slip, trying to gain access to the kill and fall upon sharpened bamboo spikes at the bottom. In Burma, bamboo stakes would be placed on both sides of a path frequented by tigers. When a tiger made physical contact with a cord tied across the path, the slit half of the bamboo clapper would loudly spring back on its other half. The sound would apparently cause the tiger to leap to one side and impale itself on one of the stakes.

=== Horse/camel back ===
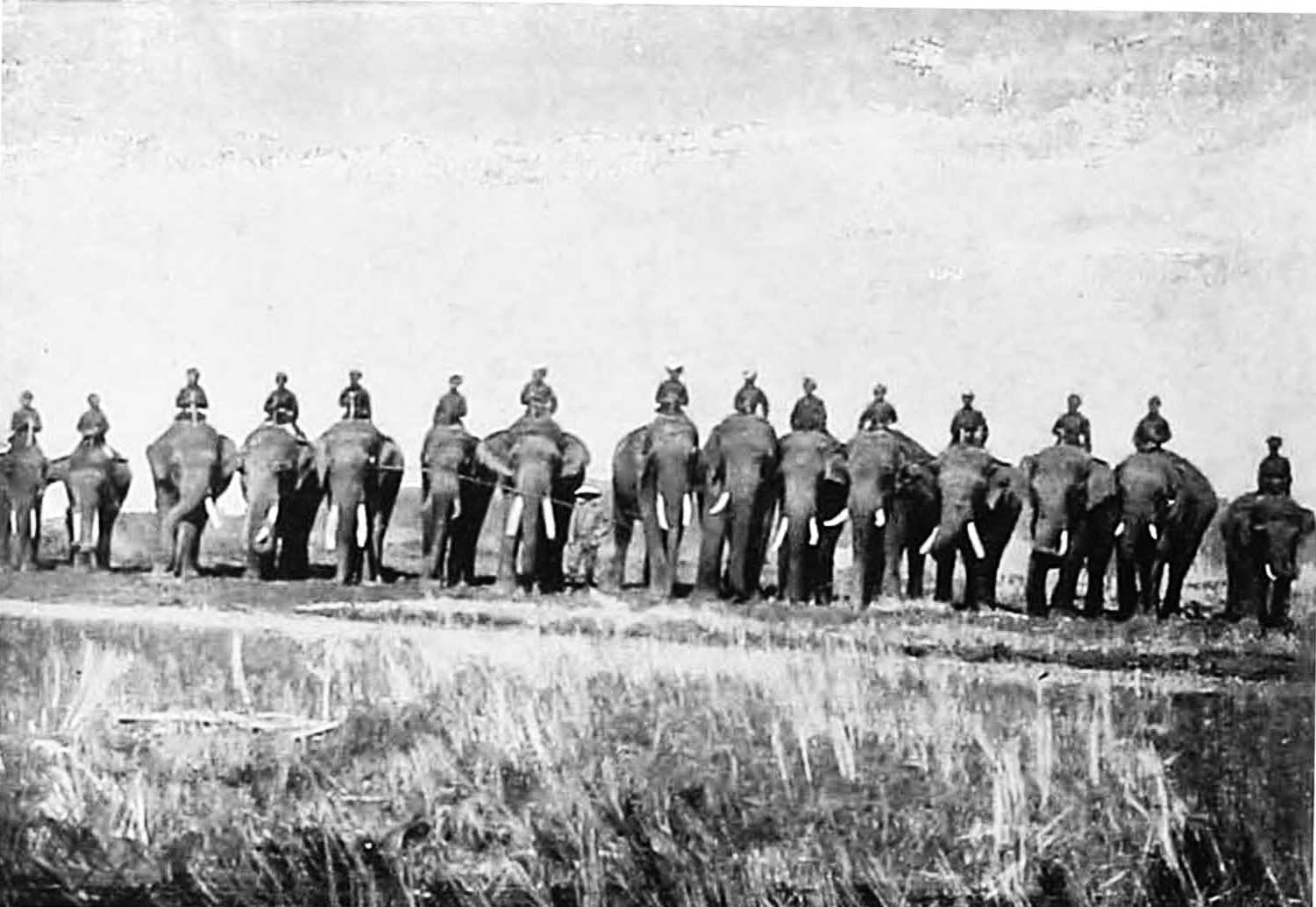
Elephant back beaters on a tiger hunt, India, late 1890's.

Horses and camels were used by cavalry officers in the 17th century India, which they found to be more reliable and less unpredictable than elephants. After chasing the tigers to exhaustion, the riders would gallop around the tigers in ever decreasing circles, and then kill the tiger with a sword.

=== Hunting dogs ===
For this purpose it was necessary to have a pack of hunting dogs of very considerable strength, well trained in the chase of every kind of big game animal found in the taiga. When hunting, the hunters would usually collect most of the dogs of their village to form a nondescript pack. Not all dogs were equal in hunting, as they differed greatly in quality and character. In every pack there were one or two leaders which the rest follow. If the leader were lost, the pack soon got out of hand. Hunters rarely brought dogs along in heavy snow, as it would impede the dogs' movement and make them easy targets for the tiger.

Upon encountering the tiger, the dogs would begin to bark furiously, at the same time catching hold of its legs and biting it in the hind quarters. In such a manner, they caused it to stop and turn at bay. When the tiger was finally cornered, the dogs would usually make high pitched barks, consistent with feelings of extreme nervousness. Half of the pack would continue to surround the tiger, while the other dogs rested. If, however, the quarry tried to break away, the whole pack charged it, with some of the dogs actually jumping on the animal's back and forcing it to halt once more. Working only from sound and keeping behind trees out of sight of the quarry, the hunter would get within easy range of the latter and shoot it.

Despite their great strength, the tigers usually did not stand their ground against the dogs unless cornered, much preferring to retreat. It was theorised that this is due to the tiger mistaking the dogs for dholes (Cuon alpinus), which have been known to kill tigers on rare occasions.

== Solutions to tiger extinction ==
To conserve the wild tigers as a species in the environment, several threats need to be addressed – habitat loss, reduction of prey populations, and direct hunting of tigers.

Human scarcity makes for less exploitation of natural resources and the wild tiger populations can in these places remain stable or increase, as long as they are not subject to poaching.

Tigers depend on trees for shelter and cover and hunting of animals that live on them. Habitat destruction and logging for new roads and dwellings harms this species ecosystem drastically. The trees allow tigers to sharpen their claws and scratch trees to provide the basic survival toolkits. The loss of vegetative elements in their reproductive and dwelling environment is a cause for concern as well, since these species rely on cover from trees and tall grasses to prey on other animals. Trees and vegetation also provide natural cover from abiotic factors and elements that these animals rely on for their protection. Tigers mate and reproduce in the same areas where they were born, therefore conserving natural vegetation and tree cover is important.

The effort to promote the recovery of tigers throughout their range has been ongoing for at least 40 years. Multiple governments have funded a special Project Tiger Program, and have been very active. Anderson et al. 2006 has analysed funding of money for tiger conservation specifically by non-governmental organisations between the years 1998–2002. Over $23 million has been invested between the countries of India, Russia, Indonesia, Malaysia and Nepal.

Gratwicke et al. 2006 writes that ExxonMobil, a major corporation has invested 12.6 million US dollars for the sole purpose of tiger conservation between the years of 1999–2004. The Wildlife Conservation Society and the Panthera Foundation announced a plan in 2008 to create a "Genetic Corridor" between Bhutan and Myanmar to help sustain a large, continuous population of tigers, spanning eight countries. This project promises to be the largest area of unbroken or unfragmented tiger habitat, and would represent the single most intense effort to conserve this species from extinction. (Rabinowitz).

Another major contributor is the World Wildlife Fund for nature. This organisation has proposed a major initiative with an objective of doubling wild tiger populations by the year 2020. In response to major organisations putting forth such great efforts, other smaller more numerous efforts have joined forces in this task. The conglomeration of these organisations has been named the international Tiger Coalition.

Sanderson et al. (2006) evaluated the effectiveness of varying conservation measures for the tiger species in differing sites through a survey of 70 conservationists. High scores were given for those areas that showed a high effectiveness in implementation with a scaling value in descending order for those measures proven ineffective. Of these measures, a few projects in India, Bhutan, Nepal, and Malaysia were considered to be most effective.

== Notable tiger hunters ==
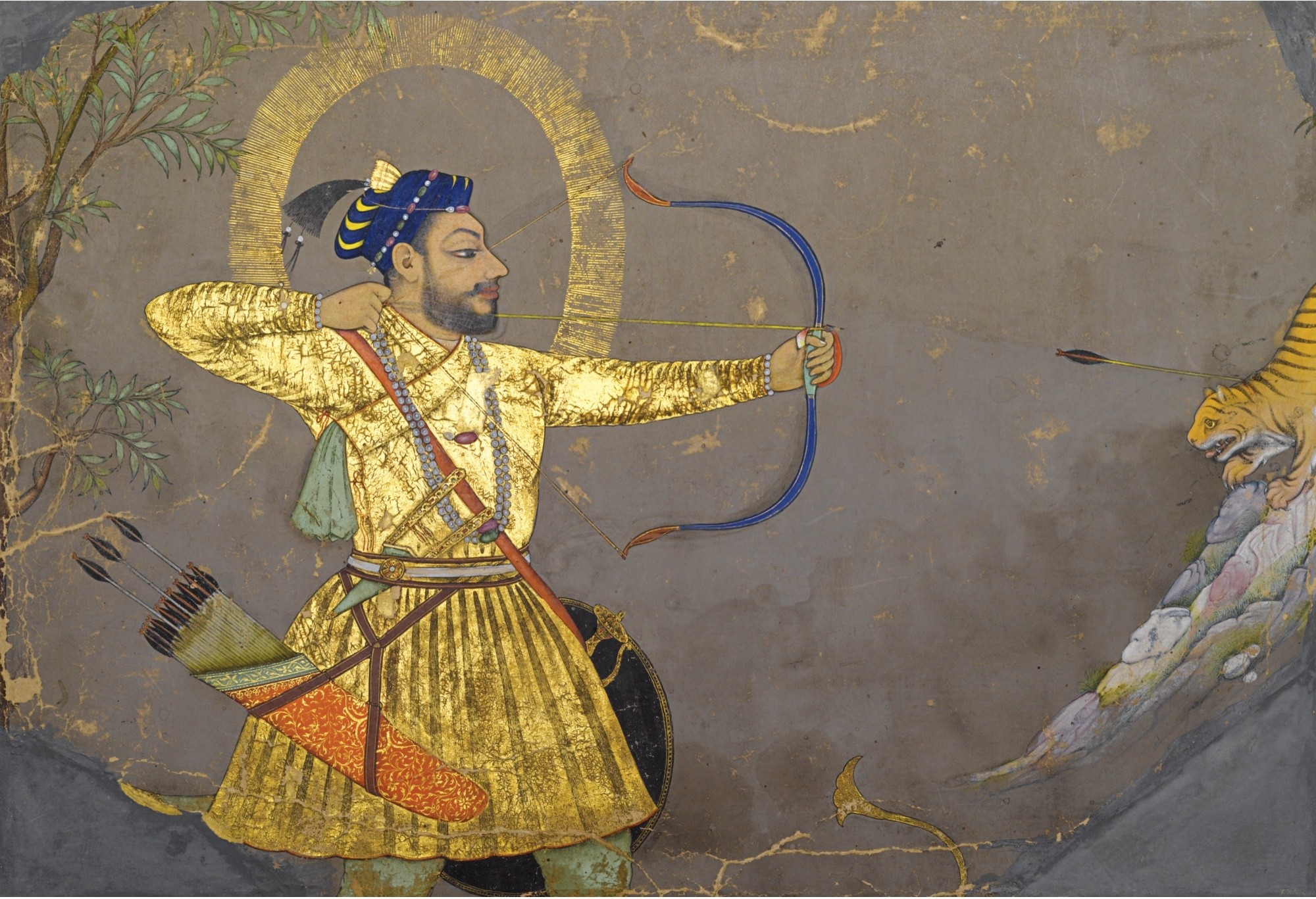
Sultan Ali Adil Shah II of Bijapur hunting tiger, c 1660

- Jim Corbett
- Kenneth Anderson
- Pachabdi Gazi
- Timur

== See also ==
- Animal welfare
- Lion hunting
- Elephant hunting in Kenya
