= Cow 569 =

New Zealand cow (1996 or 1997–2013)

- Species: Bos taurus
- Breed: Holstein Friesian
- Sex: Female
- Born: 1995 or 1996
- Died: November 2013 (aged 17)
- Resting place: Woodville, New Zealand
- Owner: Kim Riley

Cow 569 (1995 or 1996 – November 2013) was a New Zealand black and white friesian cow who gained international attention for saving a woman's life during the 2004 New Zealand floods.

== Biography ==
In February 2004, floods ravished the lower North Island of New Zealand, with the Manawatū and Rangitīkei regions bearing some of the worst floods in 100 years. On 16 February 2004, on a farm in Woodville, a 43-year-old farmer named Kim Riley got caught in the flood's current whilst trying to stop half of her herd of cattle from heading towards floodwaters. She struggled in the current for about 30 minutes before Cow 569 swam past and Riley was able to grab onto her neck. After travelling 30 metres, the pair reached higher ground, with Cow 569 inadvertently saving Riley from drowning.

The story was picked up by the BBC, and a week after the incident, Riley was contacted by Random House, and asked to write a children's book about the experience. The book, published in October 2004, was titled Cow Power. Cow 569 was pregnant when she saved Riley from drowning and in September 2004, she gave birth to a Hereford-cross bull calf. The calf, Tuggy Buoy, became the inspiration for Riley's second book, titled Baby Cow Power, which was published in 2005.

Cow 569's actions during the flood saved her from being slaughtered, even when she stopped producing milk. In 2011, Cow 569 went into semi-retirement after she developed mastitis. She lived in her own paddock whilst looking after an adopted calf called Brick.

In November 2013, Cow 569 fell ill, and died at the age of 17. Her death was announced on 18 February 2014. She was buried in an unmarked grave at Kim Riley's lifestyle block in Woodville. Over her lifetime, she had given birth to 12 calves and produced thousands of litres of milk.
