= Donald Trump (buffalo) =

Albino water buffalo

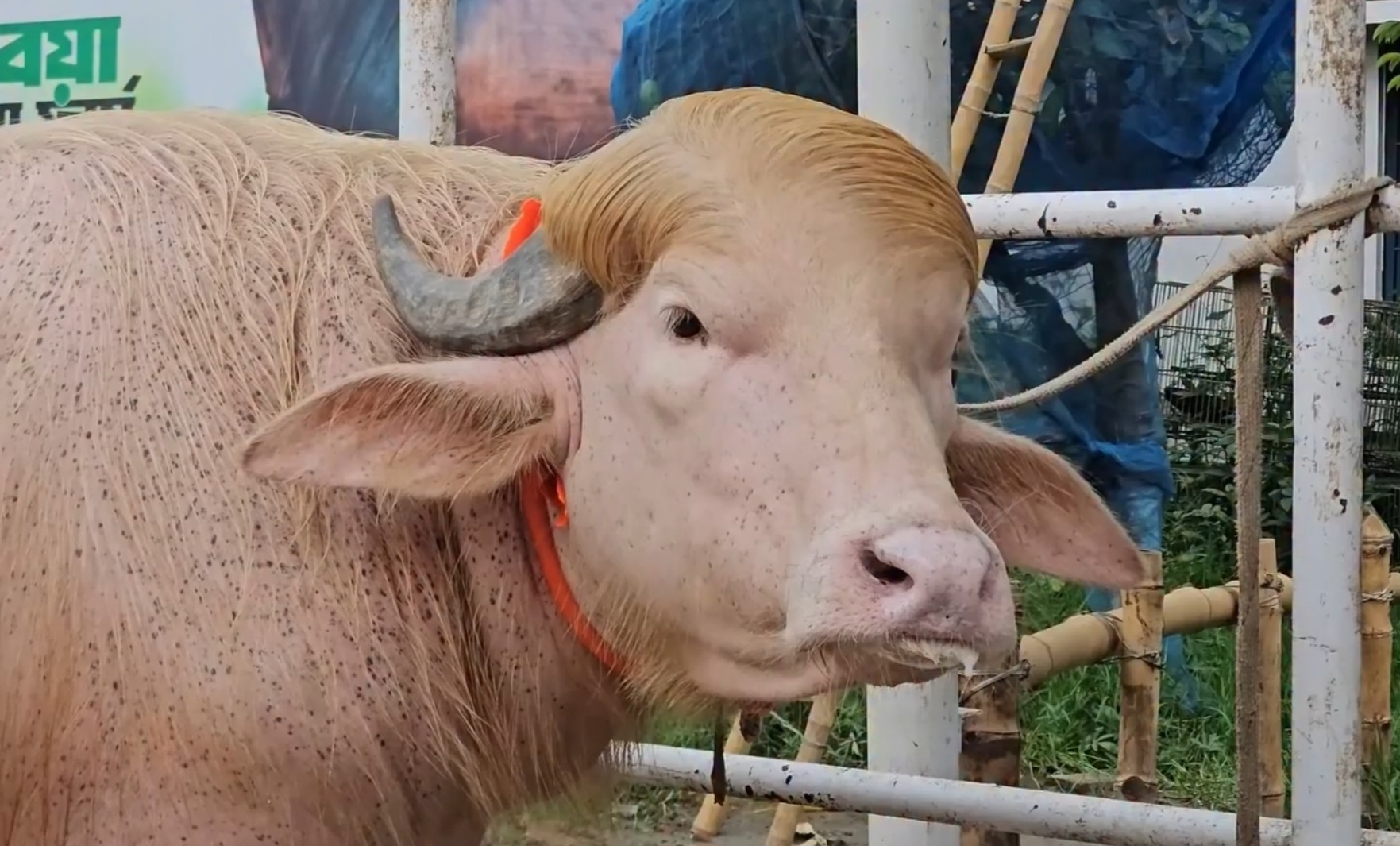
- Donald Trump in May 2026
- Other name: "Commander-in-beef"
- Species: Water buffalo
- Sex: Male
- Nationality: Bangladeshi
- Owner: Department of Livestock Services
- Residence: Bangladesh Livestock Research Institute
- Weight: 680 kg (1,499 lb; 107 st 1 lb)
- Named after: Donald Trump

Donald Trump (Note: Bengali: ডোনাল্ড ট্রাম্প, romanized: Ḍōnālḍ Ṭrāmp, pronounced [ˈɖoˌnalɖ ˈʈɾamp].) is an albino water buffalo that went viral in Bangladesh in May 2026. The owner chose the name because the buffalo's head hair and pink body color resembled the 45th and 47th president of the United States, Donald Trump. Raised on a farm in Narayanganj, the buffalo caught the attention of not only local visitors but also international media outlets. Initially sold in a livestock market to be sacrificed for Eid al-Adha, Donald Trump was acquired by the Bangladeshi government and put in the National Zoo in Mirpur, Dhaka. It was later moved to the Bangladesh Livestock Research Institute (BLRI) in Savar.

== Background and origin ==
The buffalo was raised at the Rabeya Agro Farm in the Paikpara area of Narayanganj, Bangladesh. According to the farm owner, Zia Uddin Mridha, the animal was purchased from a cattle market in Rajshahi one month after Eid al-Adha in 2025.

== Name and physical characteristics ==
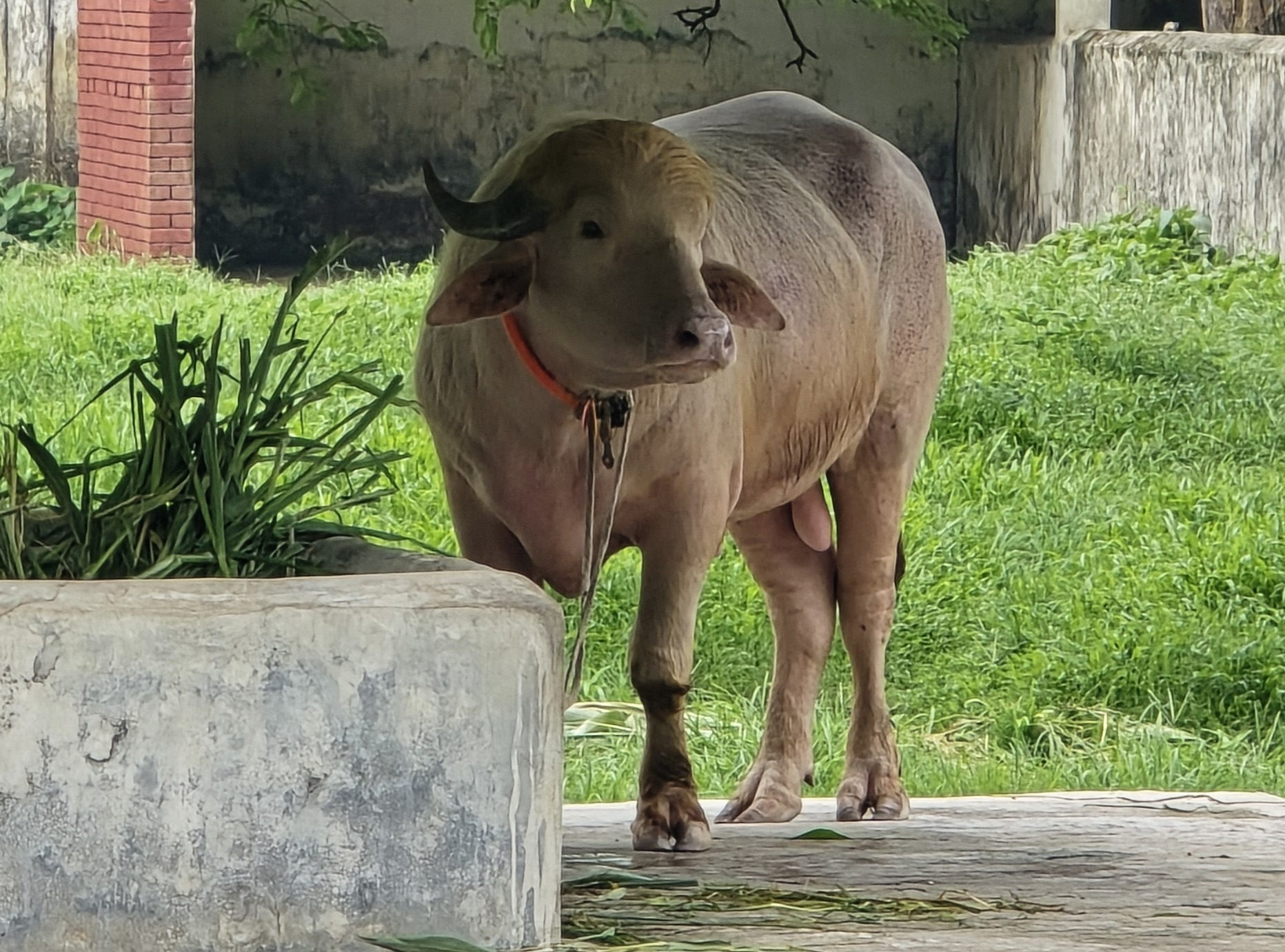
Donald Trump at National Zoo, Dhaka

As a rare albino variant, the buffalo lacks the typical black or gray skin color of common buffaloes, instead having a pinkish hue. Its most notable feature is a prominent tuft of blonde or light-colored hair on the front of its head. The buffalo weighs about 700 kg (1,540 lbs) and is currently 4 years old.

According to farm authorities and local visitors, the buffalo's hair and pinkish skin tone physically resemble the traits of US president Donald Trump. Due to this resemblance, the farmers affectionately named it "Donald Trump". Visitors and farmers have also described the buffalo to the media as having a "royal demeanor" and a calm temperament.

== Popularity and media coverage ==
In May 2026, ahead of Eid al-Adha, the buffalo went viral overnight after its photographs and videos circulated on social media. Every day, hundreds of people from various areas gathered at the farm in Narayanganj to see the buffalo.

International news agencies, including Reuters and Agence France-Presse (AFP), also published reports on the buffalo.

=== Rumors and fact-checking ===
After the buffalo went viral internationally, a fake screenshot circulated on social media in late May. The screenshot claimed that U.S. president Donald Trump had reacted to the buffalo on his own social media platform, Truth Social. Fact-checking reports by several mainstream media outlets in Bangladesh confirmed that the claim was fabricated and Trump did not make any such post. The rumor was primarily spread on social media by digitally altering an original news report from Reuters.

=== Geopolitical and political reaction ===
Following the buffalo's rise to international prominence, the animal became a subject of political satire amid the broader backdrop of the 2026 Iran war. On 22 May 2026, the official social media account of the Embassy of Iran in Russia shared a video of the buffalo, which had been previously circulated by the Russian state-affiliated media outlet RT.

The embassy's post, which mocked U.S. President Donald Trump by highlighting the buffalo's physical resemblance to him, jokingly suggested that the animal was "upset" and had lost its appetite due to the constant comparisons and public attention. The online mockery occurred during a volatile period in Iran–United States relations; despite an active, indefinite ceasefire framework established in April following major U.S.-led military strikes, the two nations remained locked in intense diplomatic friction, naval brinkmanship, and tenuous peace negotiations in Islamabad.

The post was widely reported by international news networks like Firstpost as an instance of Iran utilizing a lighthearted internet meme to engage in information warfare and political trolling against the United States. The incident was noted by observers as an example of how the viral animal had transcended its original context as a local livestock market attraction to become an unexpected focal point in wartime political discourse and international social media satire.

== Acquisition by the government ==
The buffalo, which generated significant public interest in the Eid al-Adha sacrificial livestock market, was ultimately sold for ৳385000 (US$3,100). On the day before Eid al-Adha, through the intervention of Home Minister Salahuddin Ahmed, the buffalo was spared after being retrieved from the buyer and was sent to the National Zoo. The buyer of the buffalo was fully refunded.

== See also ==
- List of individual bovines
- List of things named after Donald Trump
