= Maudine Ormsby =

Noted cow

Maudine Ormsby was a Holstein cow that was at the center of one of the most notorious pranks in U.S. college history. In the fall of 1926, Miss Ormsby was named Homecoming Queen at the Ohio State University. Rosalind Morrison won the Homecoming Queen election, but because only 10,000 students were enrolled and 12,000 votes had been cast, it was clear the election had irregularities. Rosie, as she was known, was named Queen, but being an honorable woman, withdrew when the fraud became apparent. Runner-up Maudine Ormsby, a mystery candidate nominated by the College of Agriculture but not enrolled as a student, became Homecoming Queen.

Maudine Ormsby was crowned Queen and viewed her subjects as part of the homecoming parade. According to OSU, however, she did not attend the dance held in her honor. Rosalind Morrison Strapp, would joke the rest of her life that her epitaph should read, "But for Maudine, here lies the queen."
