= Missy (cow) =

Holstein cow

Eastside Lewisdale Gold Missy
- Species: Cow
- Breed: Holstein
- Sex: Female
- Born: Eastside Lewisdale Gold Missy; 03/30/06; Pleasant Valley, Prince Edward Island
- Nationality: Canada
- Known for: Most expensive cow
- Title: Supreme Grand Champion of All Breeds 2011
- Owners: Mark Butz, Van Ruinen Dairy, Morsam, and G. Andreasen
- Awards: Supreme Champion of World Dairy Expo 2011; Supreme Champion of Royal Agricultural Winter Fair 2011

Missy is a Holstein cow who was auctioned for $1.2 million in 2009, making her the most expensive cow in the world at that time.

Eastside Lewisdale Gold Missy is a twelve-year-old black and white Holstein cow from Canada that sold for 1.2 million dollars at the Morsan Road to the Royal Sale in Uxbridge, Ontario on Wednesday, November 11, 2009. This purchase has made Missy the current most expensive cow in the world. She was the fifth cow in the world and the second in Canada to have been sold for over 1 million dollars. Her prior owner and breeder Bloyce Thompson of Eastside Holsteins stated that "She's the most valuable young cow in the world right now [and] is one of the top show cows in North America". She was also the Grand Champion of the 2009 Western Fall National Show.

In 2011, Missy was named Supreme Grand Champion Of All Breeds at the World Dairy Expo in Madison, Wisconsin. Missy was named Supreme Grand Champion of All Breeds at the Royal Agricultural Winter Fair in Toronto, Ontario in 2011. In 2012, Missy was named Holstein Canada cow of the year.

Listed as Lot #1 she was sold to a Danish buyer. Her genetic material will now be used to help improve the breeding of the Holstein breed.

== Show placing ==
Year	Show	Class	Placing
2008	Westerner Championship Show	Junior 2 Year Old	1st & Reserve Intermediate Champion
2008	World Dairy Expo	Junior 2 Year Old	1st
2008	Royal Agricultural Winter Fair	Junior 2 Year Old	1st
2009	World Dairy Expo	Junior 3 Year Old	1st & Reserve Intermediate Champion
2011	World Dairy Expo	Five Year Old	1st & Grand Champion & Supreme Champion
2011	Royal Agricultural Winter Fair	Five Year Old	1st & Grand Champion & Supreme Champion
2013	Royal Agricultural Winter Fair	Longtime Production	1st

== Owner history ==
Owner(s)	Ownership date
Frizzells Valleyville Farm	March 30, 2006
Morsan Farms	April 1, 2008
Georges Uebelhardt, Gerit Andreasen, Mark Butz, Van Ruinen Dairy, and Morsan Farms	Nov 11 2009
Gerit Andreasen, Mark Butz, Van Ruinen Dairy, and Morsan Farms	May 7, 2012
Morsan Farms	April 1, 2014

== Daughters ==
Name	Classflied	Owner	Birth Date
Morsan Miss Tique	EX-93-5E		Oct 11 2012
Lindy West	EX-90	Goldenset Farms	Dec 1 2010
Morsan Miss Sidney	EX-90	Ferme Intense, LCGFacco-Gen	July 30, 2011
Morsan Miss Redemption	EX-90	Parbro Farms	Oct 12 2012
Morsan Miss Elite	EX-90	Morinville Hutterite Colony	Feb 7 2013
Morsan Miss Bounty	EX-90	Schaikin Farm	Feb 11 2013
Valleyville Dolman Missy	VG-89	Westcoast Holsteins	April 9, 2008
Morsan Miss Congeniality	VG-88	Lindenright Holsteins, Shotgun Holsteins	June 2, 2010
Morsan Miss Represented	VG-88	Stanhope Dairy Farm, Wedgewood Holsteins	Oct 2 2010
Morsan Miss Universe	VG-88	Westcoast Holsteins	Oct 2 2010
Morsan Miss Interpret	VG-88	Frizzells Valleyville Farm, Straitside Holsteins	Feb 1 2011
Morsan Miss Saigon	VG-88	Eastside Holsteins	March 1, 2011
Morsan Miss Attraction	VG-88	Goldenset Farms	March 27, 2011
Morsan Miss Snow Angel	VG-88	Frizzells Valleyville Farm, Lewisdale Holsteins, Eastside Holsteins	June 18, 2011
Morsan Miss Conformation	VG-88	Snowdame Farms	April 27, 2012
Morsan Pball Missy 3004	VG-88	Westcoast Holsteins	April 15, 2015
Morsan Doorman Missy 3362	VG-88	Quebequa, Westcoast Holsteins	Sept 1 2015
