= Malacrianza (bull) =

Costa Rican Brahman bull (died 2015)

- Malacrianza after retirement
- Species: Cattle
- Breed: Brahman
- Sex: Bull
- Died: 19 March 2015; Garza, Costa Rica
- Cause of death: Cardiac arrest
- Years active: 2004–2013
- Known for: Killing two riders
- Owner: Ubaldo Rodríguez
- Weight: 700 kg (1500 lb)

Malacrianza (Spanish pronunciation: [malakɾi'ansa], lit. 'bad upbringing') was a Costa Rican Brahman bull from the Guanacaste Province famous for participating in bullfighting. He made his debut in 2004 and is notable for having killed two bullfighters, which caused him to become a Costa Rican cultural icon.

== Background ==
In Costa Rica, laws prevent the killing or injuring of animals for entertainment. As such, Costa Rican bullfighting is substantially different than the styles performed in countries such as Mexico or Spain. In Costa Rica, bullfighters try to subdue bulls by riding them to exhaustion and can do little to defend themselves if attacked.

== Biography ==
In 2003, farmer Ubaldo Rodríguez purchased a bull from the Urbina family farm. They sold the bull because he was too aggressive for farmwork. The bull made his bullfighting debut in 2004 at the Los Angeles de Nicoya bull festival. He was originally named Tigrillo, but his name was later changed to Malacrianza, roughly translating to "bad upbringing" or "poorly raised", owing to his rude personality. He was owned by Ubaldo Rodríguez and his wife Amelia Gómez. In 2005, the bull killed Juan Carlos Cubillo when Cubillo fell from his back, and in 2006 he killed Jason Gómez by goring him with one of his horns. Both of these men were accomplished and skilled bullfighters. Malacrianza retired after competing for nine years. His final performance was at the Playa Garza town festivals in 2013.

After retirement, he lived in a pasture near Playa Garza. He loved to eat mangos and waited to be fed one every morning. He was found dead in his pasture on 19 March 2015; he was 16 years old, and it was believed that he had died from cardiac arrest. His body was buried in his pasture. His head was mounted by a taxidermist and remains in the home of Ubaldo Rodríguez.

== Reception and legacy ==
Malacrianza's strength and violence made him hugely popular among fans. He was well-known for the style of his performances as well as the deaths he caused. He was featured in music videos and merchandise, and a butchery in San José was named in his honor. He was known among fans by many nicknames such as El Corazón de Garza (lit. 'The Heart of Garza'), Su Majestad (lit. 'His Majesty'), and El Toro Asesino (lit. 'The Murderous Bull').

Malacrianza has been credited with "saving" Costa Rican bullfighting. Prior to his debut, the sport was widely waning in popularity, but the two deaths he caused created widespread media coverage of the sport that boosted its popularity nationwide. He has also been described as "Costa Rica's most famous bull". On 31 October 2015, a life-sized statue of Malacrianza was erected on a hill overlooking the road from Garza to Nosara. The statue was created by Johnny Garcia Clachar, a sculptor from Liberia.

== See also ==
- List of individual bovines
