= Fukutsuru =

Wagyū bull

Fukutsuru

Fukutsuru or Fukutsuru 068 was a Wagyū bull shipped from Japan to Snake River Farms of Boise, Idaho in the United States in the early 1990s. Fukutsuru fathered countless cattle and helped grow today's U.S. Wagyu beef industry. Fukutsuru died in 2005, but his frozen sperm lived on for people's benefit; more than 100,000 "units" of which were collected for long-term breeding purposes prior to his death.
