= Stephenson, Wisconsin =

- Town
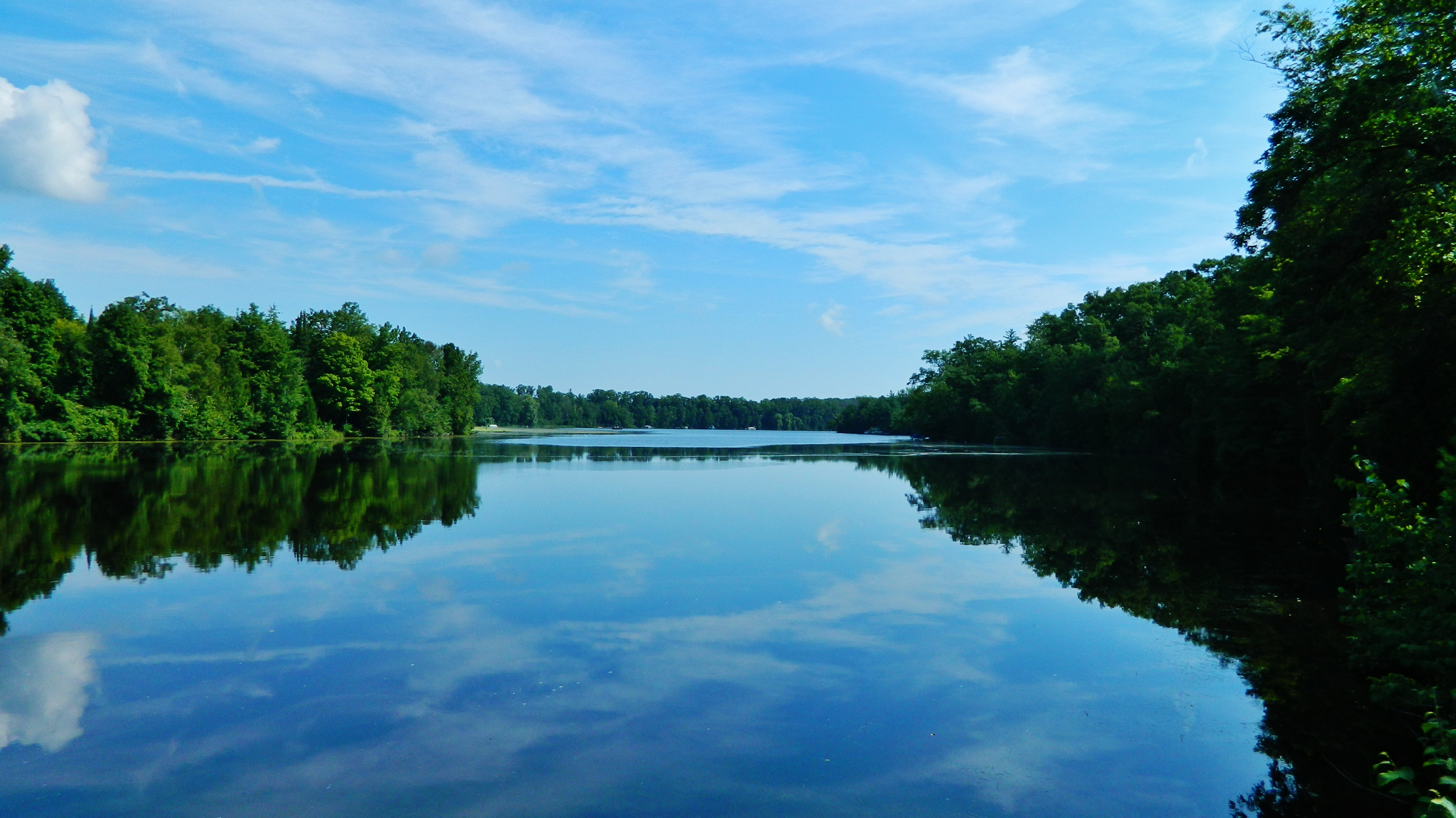
- Peshtigo River as seen from Stephenson.

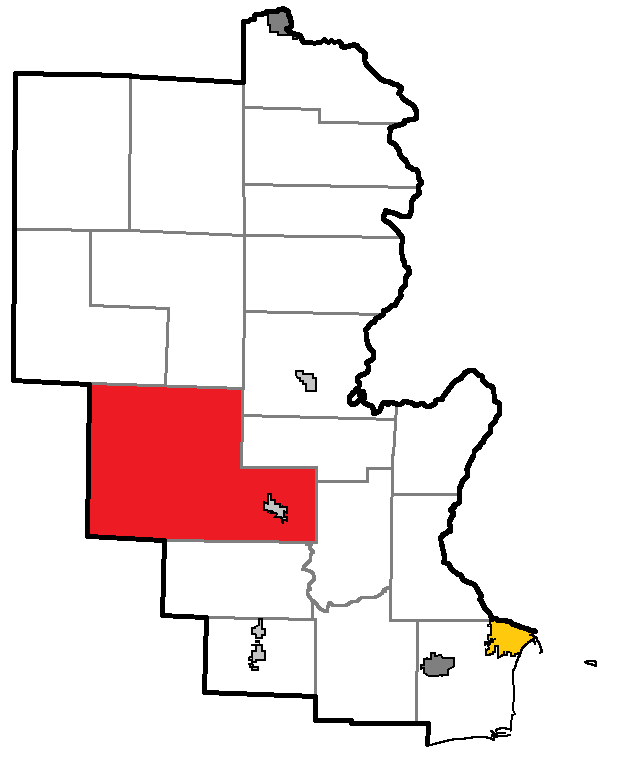
- Location of Stephenson, within Marinette County
- Coordinates: 45°17′15″N 88°8′59″W
- Country: United States
- State: Wisconsin
- County: Marinette

Area
  - Total: 176.8 sq mi (457.9 km^{2})
  - Land: 169.6 sq mi (439.2 km^{2})
  - Water: 7.2 sq mi (18.7 km^{2})
- Elevation: 890 ft (270 m)

Population (2020)
  - Total: 3,494
  - Density: 20.60/sq mi (7.955/km^{2})
- Time zone: UTC-6 (Central (CST))
  - Summer (DST): UTC-5 (CDT)
- FIPS code: 55-77000
- GNIS feature ID: 1584217

Stephenson is a town in Marinette County, Wisconsin, United States. The population was 3,494 at the 2020 census.

== History ==
The town of Stephenson was organized in 1897 with the name of Crivitz and changed to its current name in 1905. The town is named for Isaac Stephenson, a Republican member of Congress who represented Wisconsin's 9th Congressional District from 1883-1889 and a US Senator from Wisconsin from 1907-1915.

== Geography ==
According to the United States Census Bureau, the town has a total area of 176.8 square miles (457.9 km^{2}), of which 169.6 square miles (439.2 km^{2}) is land and 7.2 square miles (18.7 km^{2}) (4.08%) is water.

== Demographics ==
As of the census of 2000, there were 3,065 people, 1,369 households, and 955 families residing in the town. The population density was 18.1 inhabitants per square mile (7.0/km^{2}). There were 3,777 housing units at an average density of 22.3 per square mile (8.6/km^{2}). The racial makeup of the town was 98.24% White, 0.13% African American, 0.69% Native American, 0.10% Asian, 0.07% Pacific Islander, 0.23% from other races, and 0.55% from two or more races. Hispanic or Latino of any race were 0.82% of the population.

There were 1,369 households, out of which 19.8% had children under the age of 18 living with them, 60.0% were married couples living together, 5.8% had a female householder with no husband present, and 30.2% were non-families. 25.6% of all households were made up of individuals, and 11.2% had someone living alone who was 65 years of age or older. The average household size was 2.23 and the average family size was 2.63.

In the town, the population was spread out, with 18.6% under the age of 18, 4.2% from 18 to 24, 22.0% from 25 to 44, 34.6% from 45 to 64, and 20.7% who were 65 years of age or older. The median age was 48 years. For every 100 females, there were 111.8 males. For every 100 females age 18 and over, there were 110.0 males.

The median income for a household in the town was $34,516, and the median income for a family was $40,725. Males had a median income of $30,735 versus $20,931 for females. The per capita income for the town was $18,312. About 3.8% of families and 7.6% of the population were below the poverty line, including 6.4% of those under age 18 and 9.2% of those age 65 or over.
