= Bangladesh National Zoo =

National and Largest zoo of Bangladesh

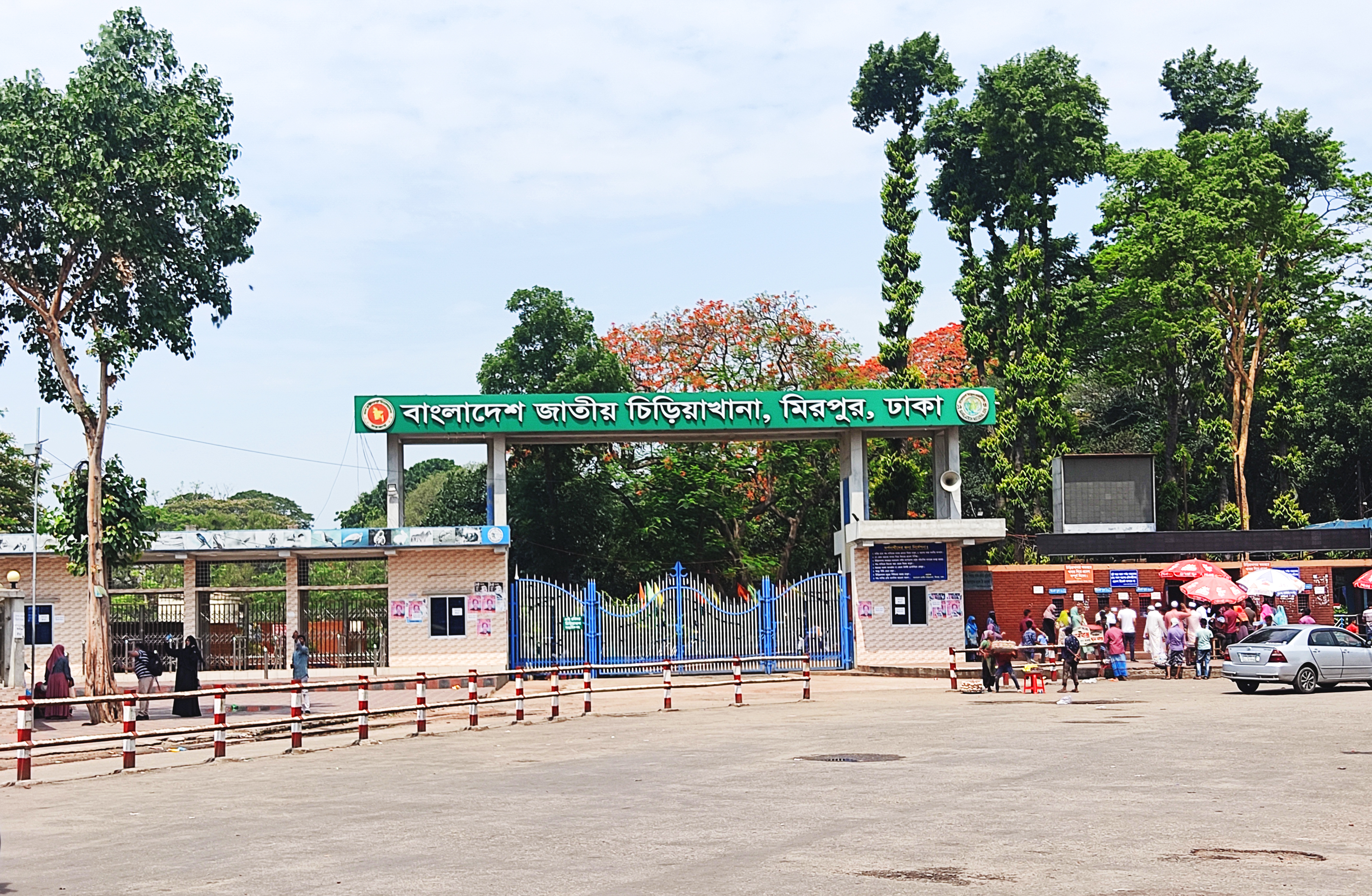
- Zoo Entrance
- Interactive map of Bangladesh National Zoo
- 23.812674°N 90.3446102°E
- Date opened: 23 June 1974
- Location: Mirpur, Dhaka, Bangladesh
- Land area: 186 acres (75 ha)
- No. of animals: 2150
- No. of species: 191
- Annual visitors: 3,000,000
- Major exhibits: Royal Bengal tiger, estuarine crocodile, impala, emu, Lion, black bear

Bangladesh National Zoo, (Bengali: বাংলাদেশ জাতীয় চিড়িয়াখানা) is a zoo located in the Mirpur section of Dhaka, the capital city of Bangladesh. The zoo contains many native and non-native animals and wildlife, and attracts about three million visitors each year. On 5 February 2015, the name was changed from Dhaka Zoo to Bangladesh National Zoo.

Established in 1974, the 186-acre (75 ha) Bangladesh National Zoo is the largest zoo in Bangladesh, and is operated by the Ministry of Fisheries and Livestock. The zoo attracts around 10,000 visitors every day with the number increasing during the weekends and holidays. The zoo is also known for its poor conditions for animals and the corruption of its officials.

== History ==
On 26 December 1950, the agricultural, cooperation and aid ministry officially declared to establish a zoo in Dhaka. Hence, the zoo started at that time at Segunbagicha, near the High Court of Dhaka with several spotted deer, peacocks, monkey and elephant. The zoo later relocated to the present Eidgah Maidan, featuring a larger collection of animals. Later in 1961 a board was created to ensure proper management of the zoo. Later, after acquiring animals from internal and from foreign countries, the zoo inaugurated at its present location on 23 June 1974.

After a number of animal deaths in 2009, the zoo curator and deputy curator were temporarily suspended and a committee was formed to investigate the deaths. Zoo administration claimed that its main problem was the lack of veterinary doctors (it had only one doctor), and that it had already requested additional veterinary staff. The zoo is noted by international agencies as corrupt, and when two black rhinoceros were sent from South Africa to Dhaka in 2013, conservation groups in South Africa expressed concerns over of appalling treatment of animals, calling it a "Hell hole."

== Animals ==
As of 2024, the zoo is home to 2,150 animals from 191 species. Elephant-back and horse-back rides are available at the zoo in addition to fishing.

The zoo exhibits 58 species of mammals, including elephants, cheetahs, rhinos, zebras, waterbucks, otters, hyenas, deer, giraffes, impala, black bears, tapirs, hippos, lions, many species of monkeys, chimpanzees, baboons, and Bengal tigers. The aviaries at the zoo house more than 1500 birds representing 91 species, including peacocks, rhea, African gray parrots, cassowary, owls, ostrich, emus, gray crows, teals, finches, babblers, owls, vultures, and eagles. The two lakes at the zoo also host migratory water birds each winter. Visitors can also see 13 species of reptiles including snakes and crocodiles, and 28 species of fish.

In 2026, the zoo acquired an albino buffalo named Donald Trump.
