= Meadow (calf) =

Black Angus calf with prosthetics

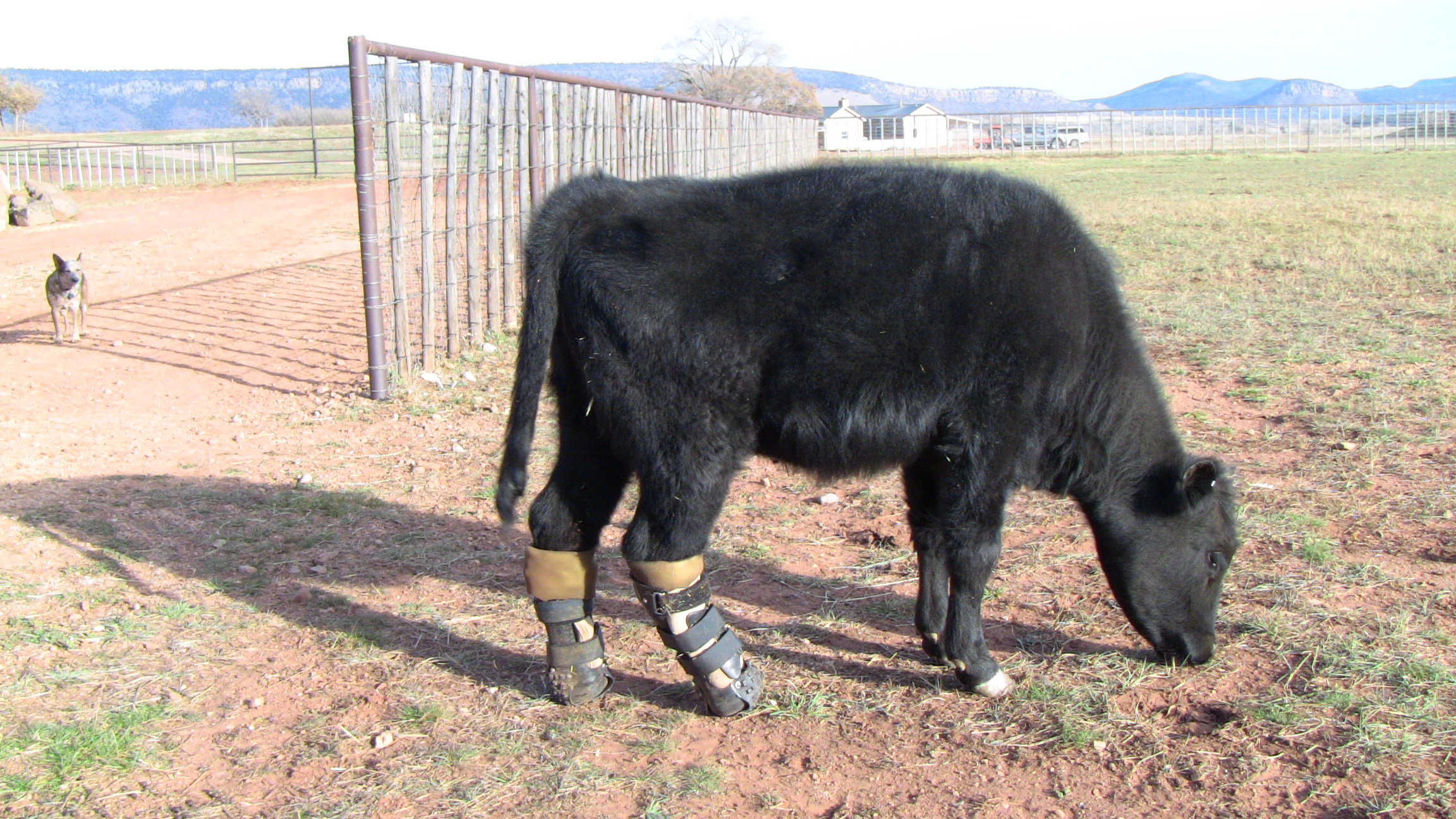
Meadow at her home on Twin Willows Ranch

Meadow is a Black Angus calf who is believed to be the first bovine calf fitted with double prosthetics.

Meadow was born in northeastern New Mexico. She lost both of her back hooves to frostbite and was found badly wounded on a neighbor's property by Nancy Dickenson, who has helped over a dozen other animals that have been injured. After seeing the serious injuries of the wounded calf, Dickenson wanted to give her the ability to walk again.

After consulting with veterinarians to ensure Meadow could lead a quality life, the doctors amputated a portion of the calf's hind legs and fitted her with new prosthetics. Colorado State veterinarian Dr. Robert Callan stated that he believes this to be the first bovine calf to be fitted with double prosthetics. He has based this claim with talks he has had with other veterinarian clinics and schools.

== Procedure ==
The procedure took place at the Colorado State University's (CSU) Veterinary Teaching Hospital. The procedure involved five anesthesiologists, expert large animal veterinarians, surgeons, and CSU veterinary students. The reason for the large number of anesthesiologists was due to the number of difficulties involved in anesthetizing cattle. The most difficult of these is keeping the animal from aspirating its stomach contents while put asleep during surgery.

When a person undergoes surgery, they first go a period of time without eating or drinking before an elective surgery. This allows the patient's stomach to empty and decreases the opportunity of aspirating stomach content while placed under an anesthetizing agent. These precautions can not be undertaken when dealing with livestock. The calf's stomach has compartments that work "like a giant fermenting vat". This means that the stomach can never be emptied. Because of this, the food material within the stomach is frequently regurgitated back into the mouth. Coupled with a large amount of saliva, this placed the calf at a high risk of aspiration of this material. This in return could lead to an airway obstruction and later pneumonia.

== Recovery ==
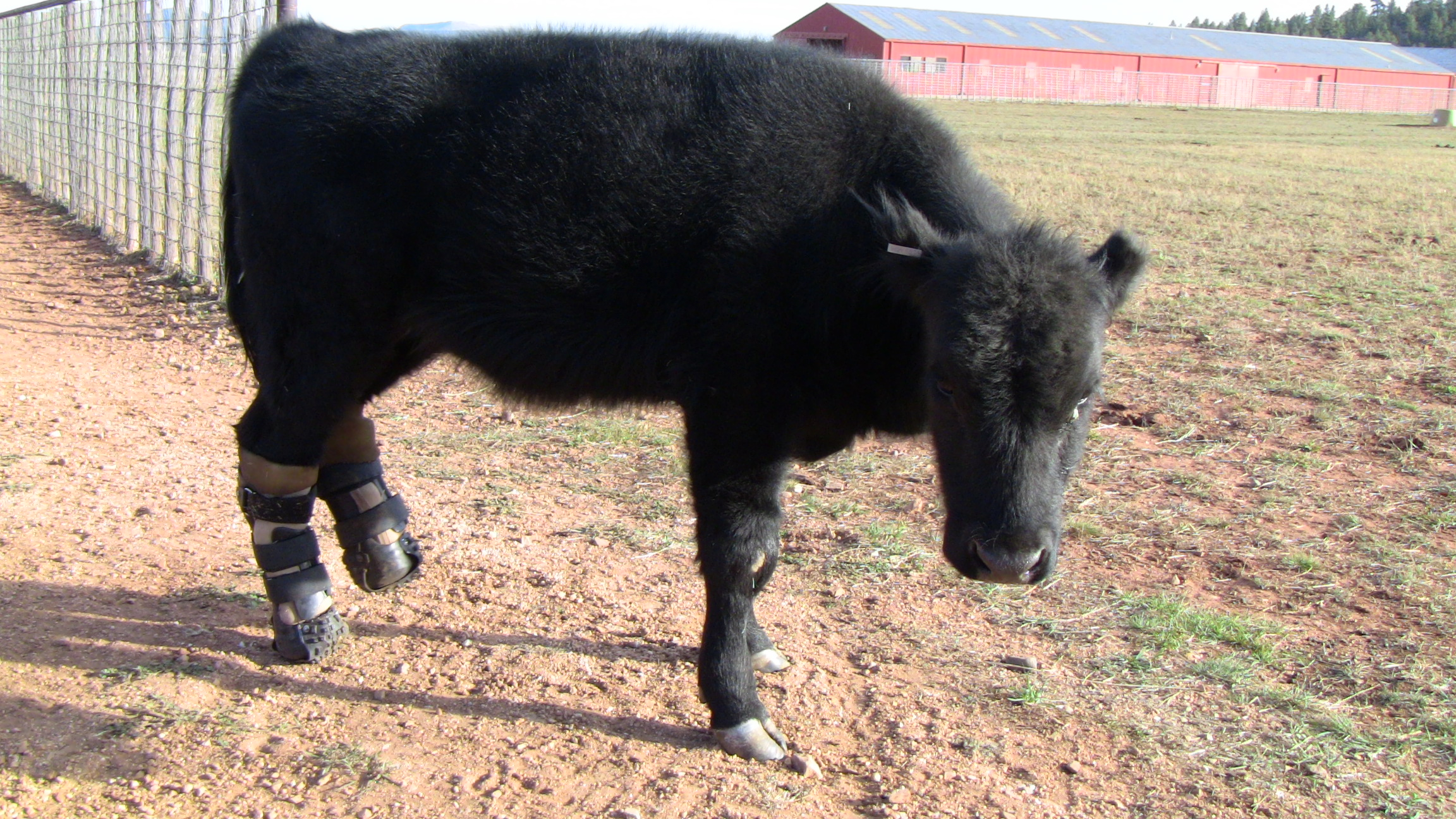

Meadow has since returned from the successful operation and prosthetic fittings. Dickenson has said she is adjusting well to her new legs as she recuperates at her new home at Twin Willows Ranch. She can be seen running and grazing, and is said to be "making friends with goats in a nearby pen."
