= Toystory (bull) =

Holstein bull

Toystory (May 7, 2001 – November 27, 2014) was a Holstein bull who sired an estimated 500,000 offspring in more than 50 countries around the world. He was owned by Genex Cooperative Inc., and was housed in Shawano, Wisconsin. In 2012, Toystory produced a world record-breaking 2 millionth unit of semen at eleven years of age, and was the first Holstein bull in history to achieve this mark. Over his lifetime Toystory produced 2.4 million units of semen. Toystory died on Thanksgiving Day in 2014 at thirteen years of age.

== History ==
Toystory was bred by the Wisconsin-based Cooperative Resources International, and was born on May 7, 2001, in Mystic Valley Dairy near Sauk City, Wisconsin. His full name was Jenny-Lou Marshall Toystory, his dam (mother) was Jenny-Lou Patron Toyanne and his sire (father) was Mara-Thon BW Marshall. Toystory produced his first collected dose of semen in November 2005. Inimex Genetics started bringing Toystory semen into the United Kingdom in 2006 and started selling the semen in 2007. On June 10, 2009, at just eight years of age Toystory became the youngest Holstein bull ever to produce a million units of semen. The semen was sold around the world, including in the Americas, Europe, Japan, China, Russia, and Pakistan. Toystory has sired an estimated 500,000 offspring in more than 50 countries. In May 2011 he became the most productive Holstein ever, surpassing the world record by producing his 1.7 millionth unit of semen at just 10 years of age. Just before his birthday in May 2012, Toystory became the first ever Holstein bull to surpass 2 million units of semen produced. On Thanksgiving Day 2014 at 13 years of age Toystory died with a lifetime semen production of 2.4 million units of semen produced.

== Daughters ==
This table contains some of the notable daughters of Toystory that have sold at auction.

| Daughters | Classflied | Sale | Selling amount |
|---|---|---|---|
| Morningview Tstory Amaya-ET | VG-87 | Morningview Sale 2009 | $75,000 |
| Savage-Leigh Lavisha-ET | VG-89 | International Intrigue Sale 2009 | $340,000 |
| Regancrest TS Benshae | VG-87 | International Intrigue Sale 2009 | $196,000 |
| BKB Toystory Abeline | | International Intrigue Sale 2009 | $15,500 |
