= Pauline Wayne =

Cow belonging to William Howard Taft and family

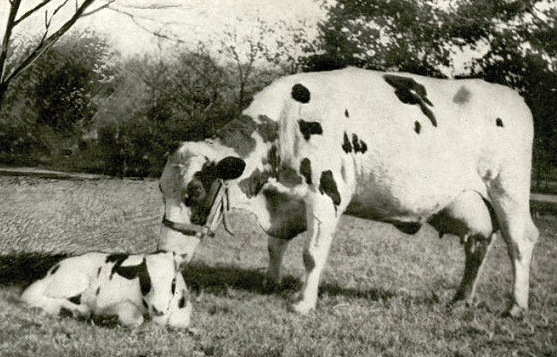
Pauline Wayne (right) with her calf, "Big Bill"

Pauline Wayne in front of the Navy Building, known today as the Eisenhower Executive Office Building

Pauline Wayne was a Holstein cow that belonged to William Howard Taft, the 27th president of the United States.

== Biography ==
Also known as "Miss Wayne", Pauline was not Taft's first presidential cow: she replaced the lesser-known "Mooly Wooly", which provided milk for the First Family for a year and a half before suddenly dying in 1910, reportedly after eating too many oats. Taft and his wife, Helen Herron Taft, had growing children, and Taft was a notoriously large eater; accordingly, Mooly Wooly was replaced by Pauline Wayne. Wisconsin senator Isaac Stephenson bought Pauline Wayne for Mrs. Taft. The four-year-old cow was pregnant and gave birth to a male calf named "Big Bill" (after the President), which was later sent to a Maryland farm.

Pauline Wayne became a popular showpiece at the International Dairymen's Exposition in Milwaukee in 1911. Pauline Wayne was being shipped to the show in a private train car that was attached to a whole train of cattle cars bound for the Chicago stock yards. The cow went missing for two days because a train switch crew had mistakenly switched Pauline's car. The attendants who found Pauline Wayne convinced the stock yard that this was indeed the President's cow, and she was saved "from the bludgeon of the slaughterer."

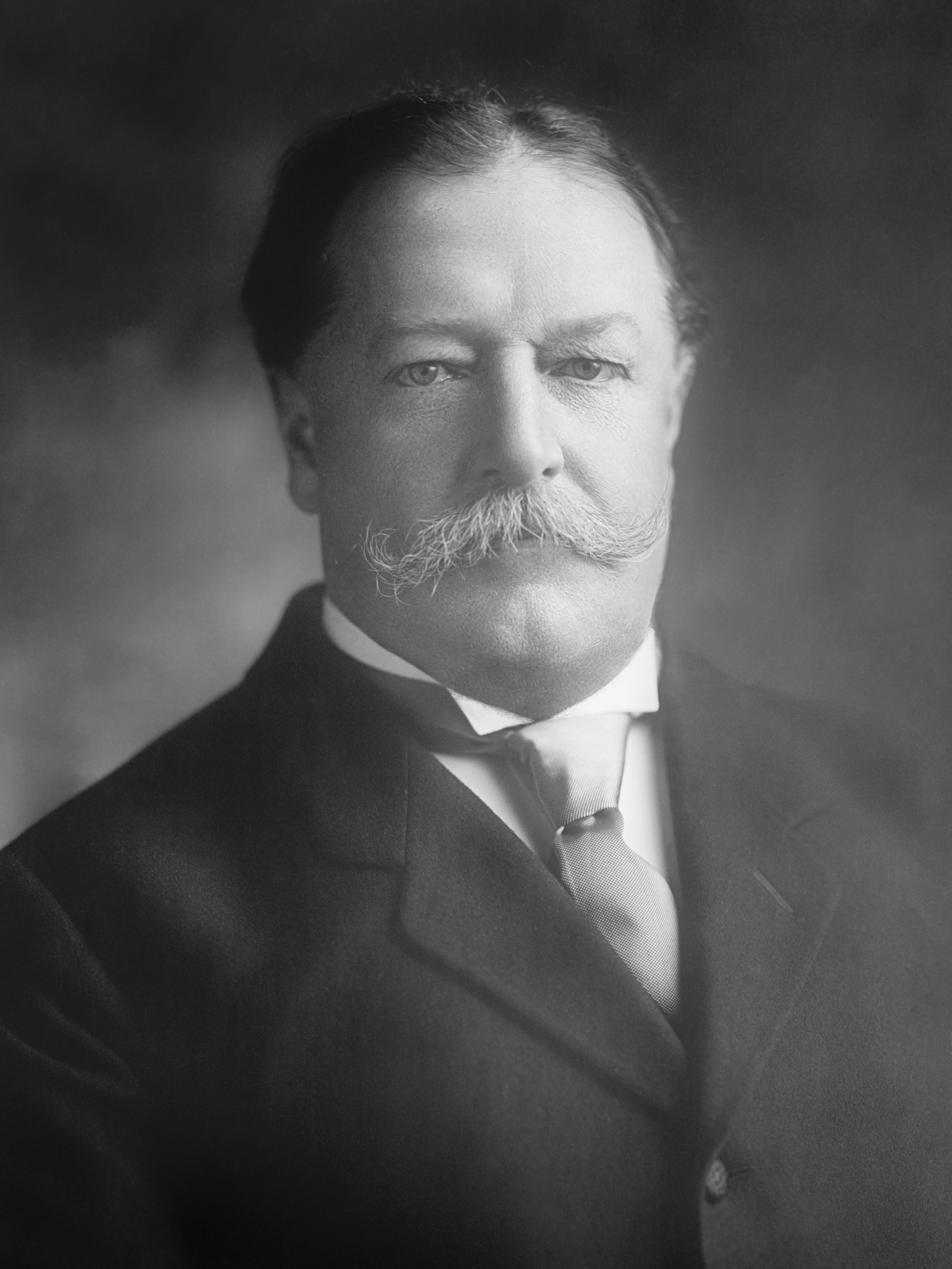
President Taft

From 1910 to 1913, Miss Wayne freely grazed the White House lawn. She was the most recent presidential cow to live at the White House and was considered as much a Taft family pet as she was livestock. When Taft left office, she was shipped to Wisconsin. Her Bovine Blue Book number was 115,580. The origin of the name "Pauline Wayne" is unknown; however, the New York Times noted that she was "a member of the great Wayne family of Holsteins."

== See also ==
- United States presidential pets
