= Karvardi =

Karvadi (1952–1972) was a Nelore cattle bull. While still alive, it became famous as the champion bull of Nelore in all the world. It was imported to Brazil in 1963 from India. There are just ten semen samples of this animal in the world. The last sale of this semen cost US$15,000. Karvadi has millions of descendants throughout the world, many of which became Nelore champions in their own right.
