= Shadow Jubilee =

American cow

Shadow Jubilee for six years was the holder of the record for the longest measured horns of any Texas Longhorn cow, with a measured spread of 89.9375" tip to tip and 98.4375" total measured on October 27, 2012. At 10 years old, she weighed 1236 lbs and currently lives on Shamrock Valley Ranch of Lapeer, Michigan owned by James and Barbara Steffler. Shadow Jubilee was featured during the Millennium Futurity held at the Glen Rose Expo Center. She was bred and raised in Ohio, purchased by James Steffler of Lapeer, Michigan, and made her first public appearance in the state of Texas.

Visitors and participants to the 2010 Millennium Futurity & Sale had an added treat that year, with many coming to the event just to see Shadow Jubilee. She was billed as the longest horned tip-to-tip Texas Longhorn cow in history and was exhibited under the front entry canopy of the Expo Center. This was her one public appearance before going on to embryo transplant production.

Jubilee, will be 13 years old on May 5, 2013. A daughter of The Shadow, she was born and raised at Dickinson Cattle Co., Inc. (DCCI) of Barnesville, Ohio. Many of the nation's leading registered Texas Longhorn cattle are bred and raised at DCCI; however, Texas producers are the ranch's major buyers.
