= Agriculture in Idaho =

Agriculture in Idaho is an important part of the state's way of life and represents a substantial portion of the state's economy. 20% of Idaho's sales each year are generated by agriculture and food/beverage processing. In 2015, agricultural products were valued at $7,463,718,000, with slightly over half of that from the sale of livestock and dairy products. Cattle is the second largest agriculture sector of the state and Idaho is the third largest producer of milk and cheese in the United States. Although dairy plays a significant role in the economy, Idaho is most known for its potatoes. Idaho is the number one producer of potatoes in the nation and contributes to 32% of the country's production. Idaho has nearly 25,000 farms and ranches spread over 11.8 million acres of land that produces more than 185 different agricultural products. The state's production ranks in the top ten in the nation in nearly 30 of the commodities it produces.

== Viticulture ==
Idaho has three approved wine-grape growing regions, or American Viticulture Areas (AVA), located throughout the state:

- Snake River Valley AVA - Approved in 2007 and located in the southern region of the state.
- Eagle Foothills AVA - Approved in 2015 and located in the southwestern region of the state. The Eagle Foothills AVA lies at 2800' above the southwestern portion of the Snake River Valley AVA and most of Idaho's 50+ wineries are concentrated in this area.
- Lewis-Clark AVA - Approved in 2016 and located in the northern region of the state.

== 2015 Top Idaho Commodities ==
In 2015, Idaho's top commodities, by value of production, were milk products and cattle/calves. Following dairy products, potatoes were the next highest producing commodity.

Commodity	Acres Harvested	Value of Production ($1000)
Milk (all)	N/A	$2,357,038
Cattle & Calves	N/A	$1,731,000
Potatoes	322,000	$912,800
Hay	1,330,000	$836,640
Wheat	1,155,000	$478,800
Sugarbeets	172,000	$283,680
Barley	580,000	$306,763
Dry Edible Beans	119,000	$70,011
Corn (Grain)	70,000	$68,103
Onions	8,000	$49,803
Peppermint	15,200	$34,154
Hops	4,900	$30,799
Apples	2,300	$14,978
Dry Edible Peas	50,000	$9,380
Lentils	32,000	$8,960
Peaches	900	$6,253
Honey	N/A	$5,468
Sweet Cherries	700	$3,636
Spearmint	1,300	$3,629
Oats	15,000	$3,806
Prunes & Plums	400	$1,021

== 2015 Idaho Organic Production ==
There are roughly 168 farms in Idaho that produce organic commodities. In 2015, 95,739 acres of cropland and 71,443 acres of pasture/rangeland produced $85,014,000 in sales. As the popularity of organic foods rises, we will continue to see an increase in the sales of these commodities.

Number of Farms	168
Cropland Acres	95,739
Pasture/Rangeland	71,443
Total Acres	167,182
Total Sales	$85,014,000

== Total Cash Receipts ==
In 2015, Idaho's agricultural products were valued at $7,463,718,000. Slightly over half of this amount was from the sale of livestock and dairy products.

Year	Dollars (1,000)
2015	$7,463,718
2014*	$8,768,017
2013*	$8,317,046
2012*	$7,586,979
2011*	$7,368,419
2010	$5,889,969
2009	$5,144,327
2008*	$6,216,935
2007*	$5,719,830
2006*	$4,589,839
2005*	$4,416,536
2004*	$4,405,372

*Record Setting Year

== 2016 Idaho Livestock (January) ==
In 2015, Idaho's number one agriculture sector, with a value of production of $3,204,663,000, was all milk products and its second largest agriculture sector, with a value of production of $1,731,000,000, was cattle. Slightly over half of the state's income comes from the sale of livestock and dairy products. Idaho is the third largest producer of milk and cheese, fourth largest producer of milk cows, sixth largest producer of sheep and lambs, and 13th largest producer of cattle and calves in the United States. There are over 500 dairies in Idaho, most of which are family-owned.

	Total Head
Cattle and Calves	1,813,000
Dairy Cattle	587,000
Sheep and Lambs	255,000

== 2015 Cash Receipts Breakdown Livestock and Crops ==
Livestock cash receipts	$4,551,997
Crops cash receipts	$2,911,720
Total cash receipts	$7,463,717

== 2015 Idaho Farms and Farmland ==
Idaho's agriculture is sustained by a high acreage of farmland and ranches. Idaho has 24,400 farms and ranches that take up 11,800,000 acres of land throughout the state.

Number of Farms/Ranches	24,400
Land in Farms/Ranches (acres)	11,800,000
Average Size of Farm/Ranch (acres)	484

== 2012 Agriculture Census ==
Irrigated Land (acres)	3,365,292
Average Age of Operator	57

== 2015 National Rankings ==
Idaho's agriculture production ranks in the top ten in the nation in nearly 30 of the 168 commodities it produces. The state ranks number one in the nation in the production of potatoes, Austrian winter peas, and trout.

Commodities	Rank	% of U.S.
Potatoes	1	32
Austrian Winter Peas	1	51
Barley	2	25
Alfalfa Hay	2	7
Sugarbeets	2	19
Wrinkled Seed Peas	2	40
Prunes and Plums	2	40
Hops	3	11
All Mint	3	19
Dry Edible Peas	4	4
Lentils	4	5
Onions (Summer Storage)	5	11
Dry Edible Beans	5	7
Spring Wheat	5	5
Sweet Cherries	5	1
Canola	6	1
Winter Wheat	7	4
All Hay	10	4
Livestock and Livestock Products
Trout	1	47
Milk	3	7
Cheese	3	8
Milk Cows	4	6
Sheep and Lambs	6	5
Wool	8	6
Cattle & Calves, All	13	3
Honey	14	2
