= Kian (bull) =

Holstein breeding bull

Kian (11 June 1997 – 2013) was a red-and-white (Holstein) breeding bull. He was the first red Holstein bull from the Netherlands whose semen was sold worldwide; more than a million units of his frozen semen were sold. He was owned by the Dutch-Belgian company CRV (nl).

Kian's sire (father) was the bull Andries and his dam (mother) was a daughter of the bull Skalsumer Sunny Boy. Kian had a purely Dutch descent with a 25% share of Meuse-Rhine-Issel-blood. This was an unusual descent at a time when nearly all bulls had well over 95% Holstein-Friesian blood. Soon after his first evaluation of breeding value in 2002, he was among the world's ten best bulls in most breeding value lists. By 2008, he had produced one million units of semen. By the time of his death, 1.4 million had been sold, including some exported to Europe, South Africa, North America and New Zealand.

The cows produced from Kian are noted for their relatively long life, milk of high protein content, and good physical and skeletal form. Kian's calves include Delta Fidelity, Apina Curitis, and Peul Kylian.
