= Holstein Friesian =

Breed of dairy cattle

- A cow in Quebec
- Other names: Holstein cattle, Friesian cattle
- Country of origin: Netherlands, Germany
- Distribution: Worldwide
- Use: Dairy farming

Traits
- Weight: 680–770 kg (1,500–1,700 lb)
- Height: 145–165 cm (57–65 in)
- Coat: black and white pied; also red and white.
- Horn status: horned, mainly dehorned as calves

Notes
- originally a dual-purpose breed, used for both dairy and beef
- Cattle; Bos (primigenius) taurus

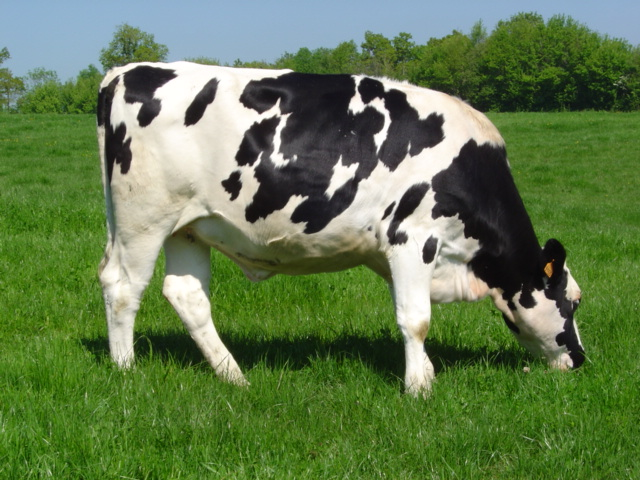
A Holstein heifer

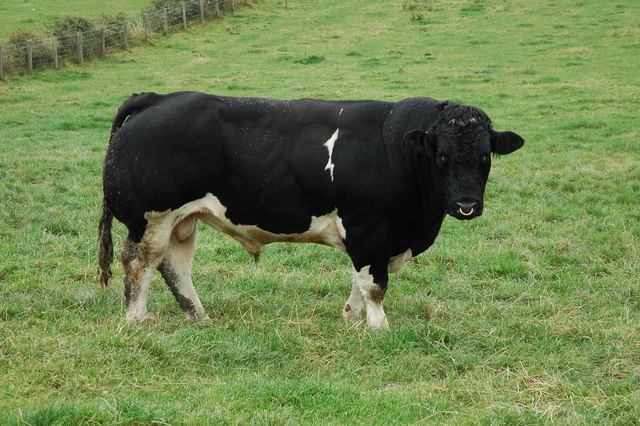
A polled bull in Llandeilo Graban, Powys

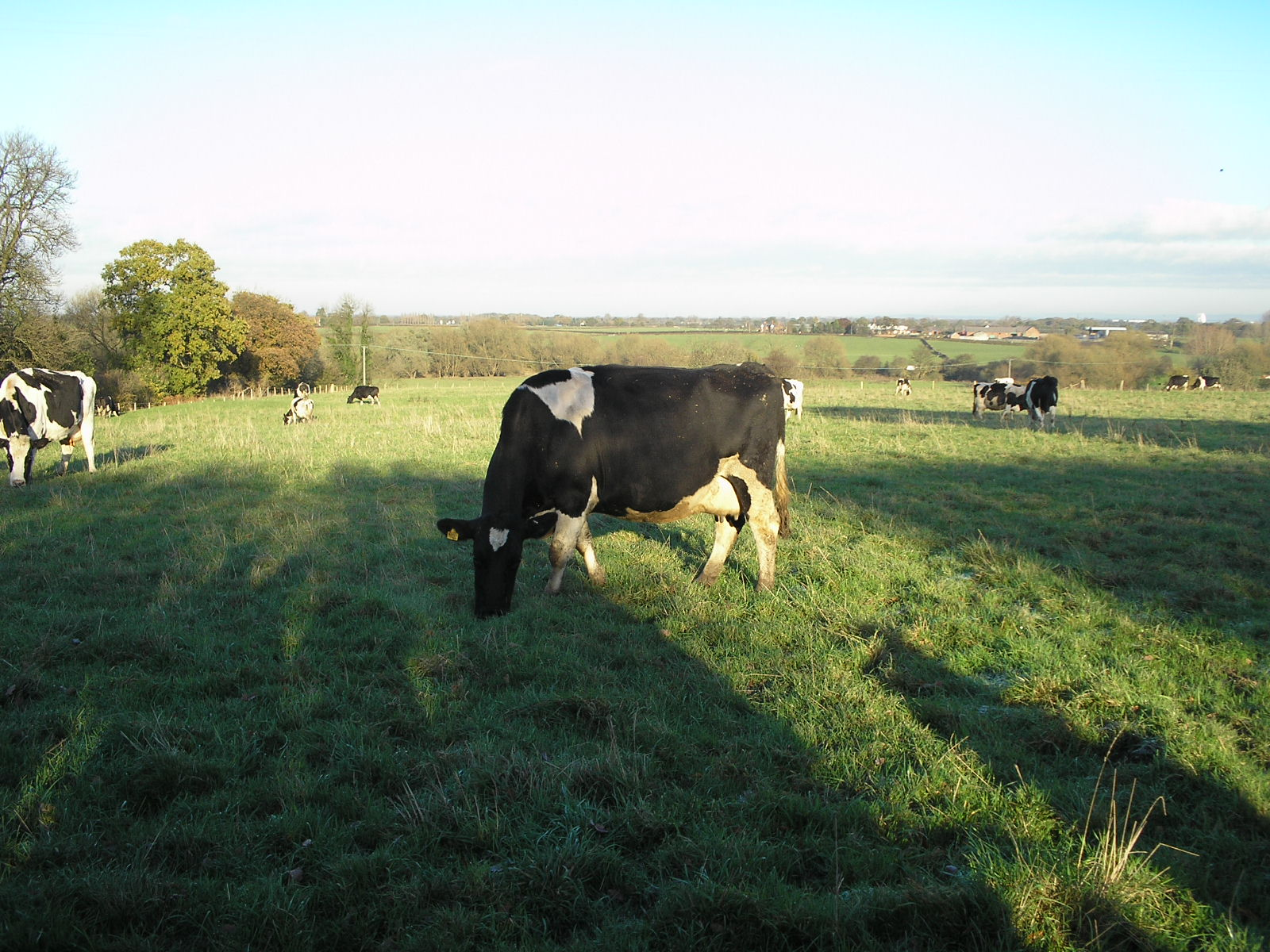
A British Friesian cow grazing

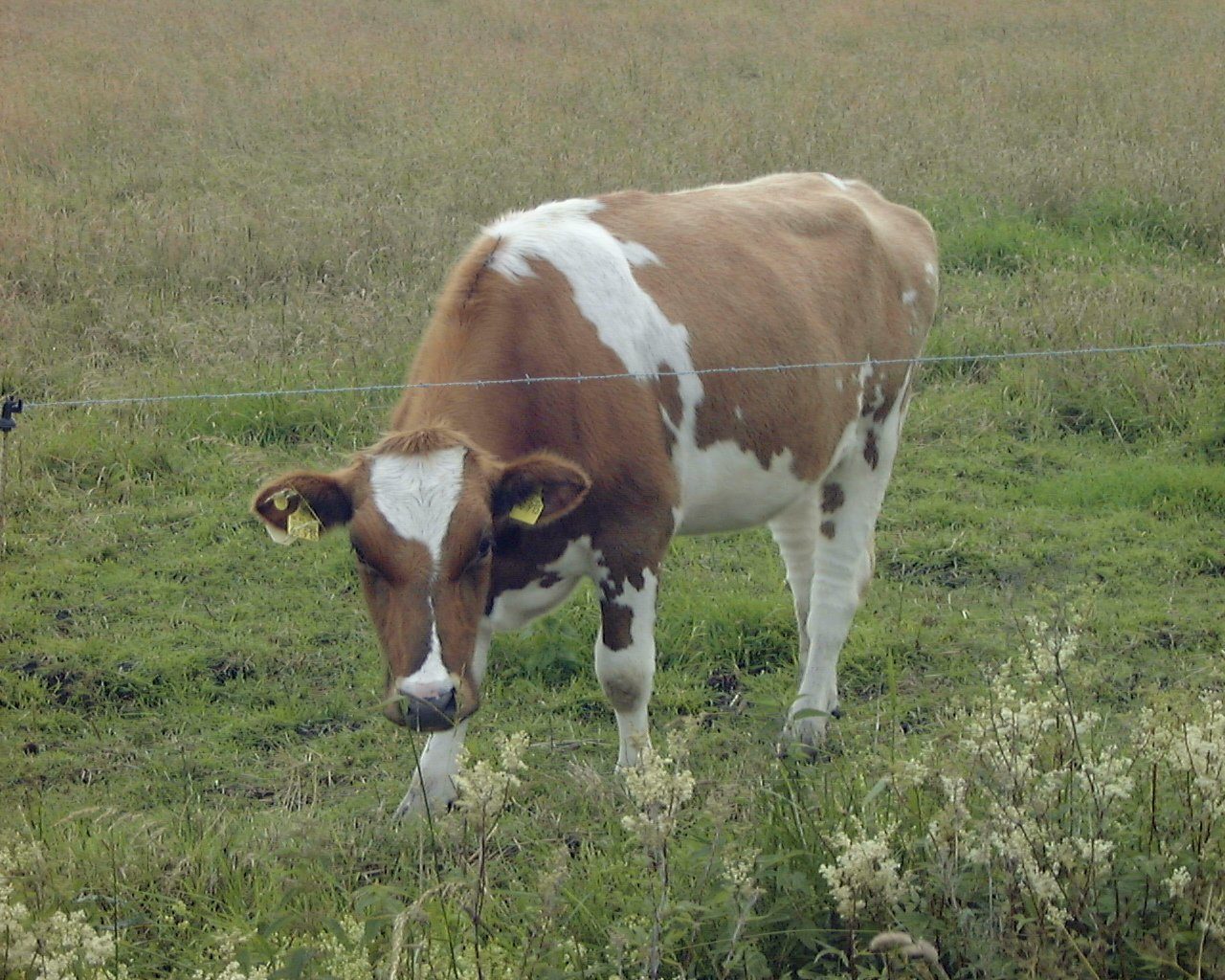
A red and white heifer

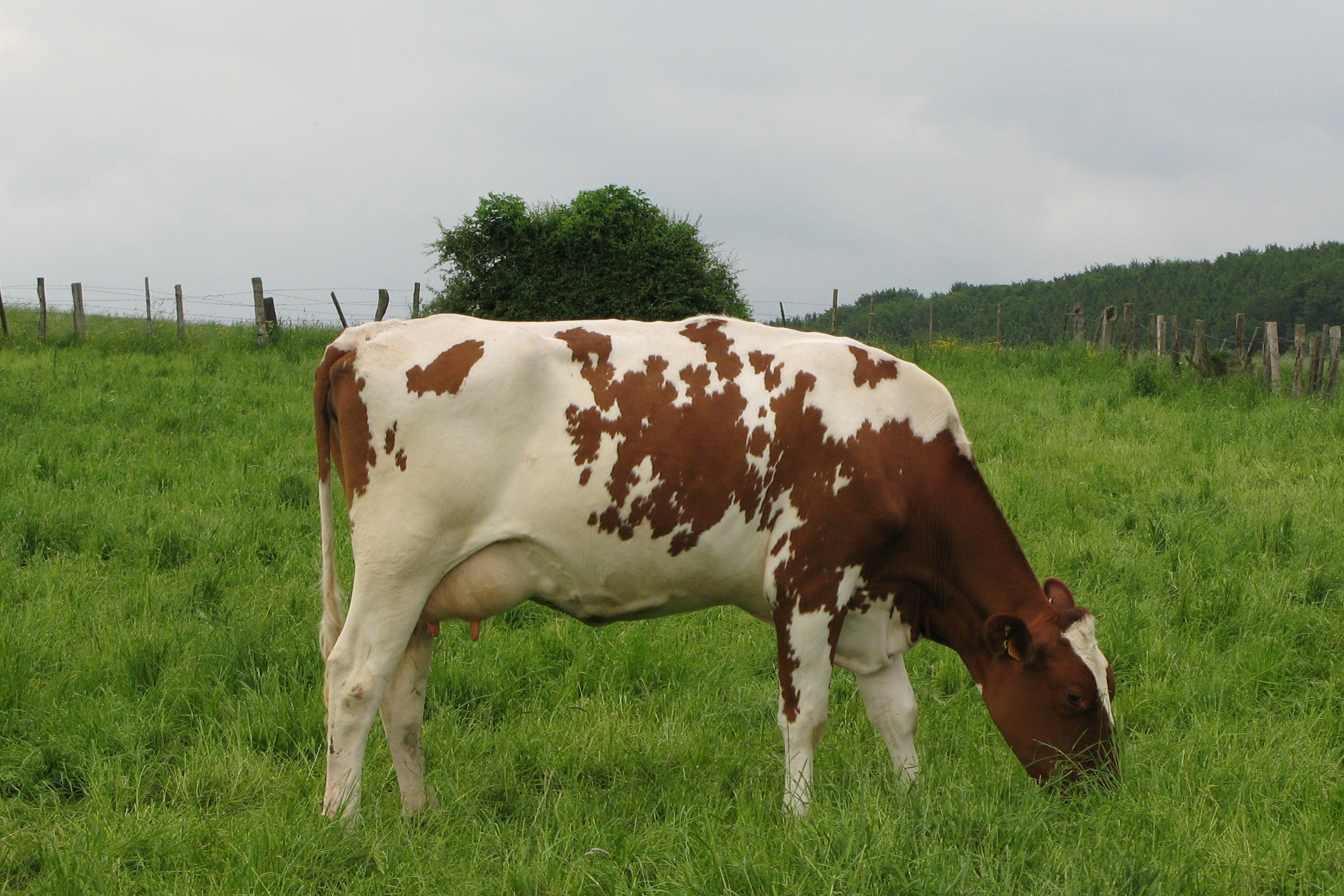
A red and white heifer

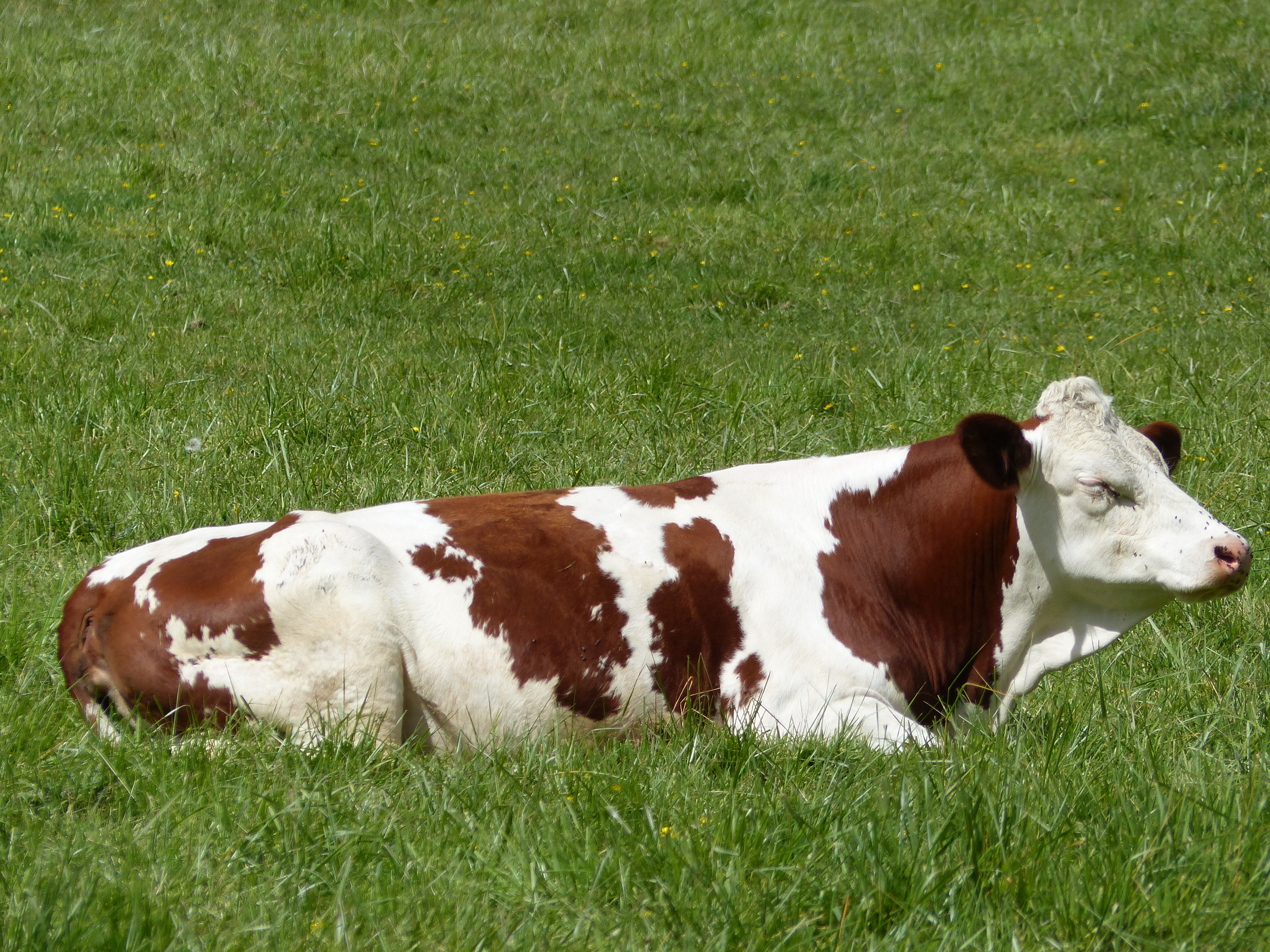
A red and white Holstein

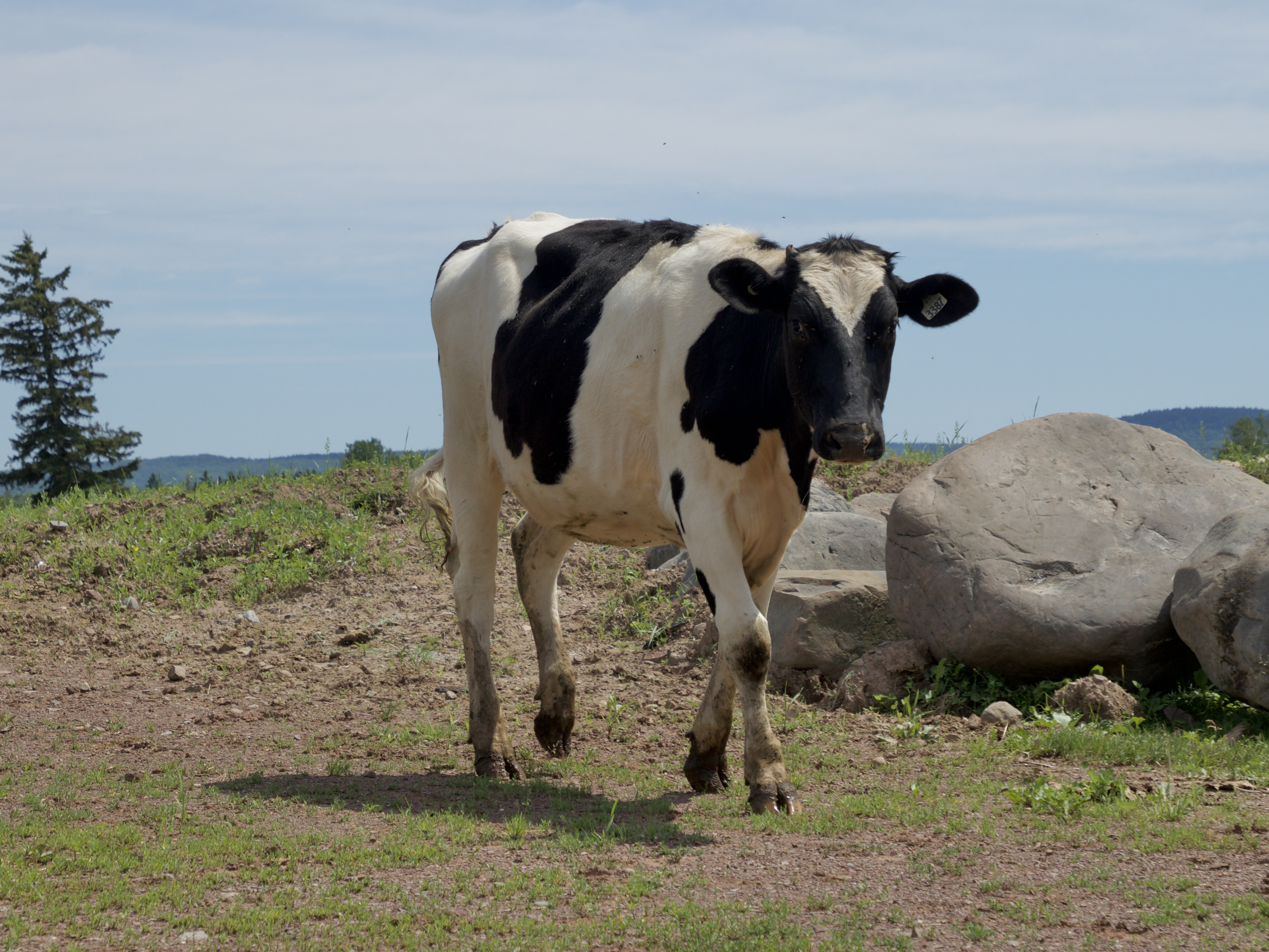
Holstein cow in Gaspesie, Quebec

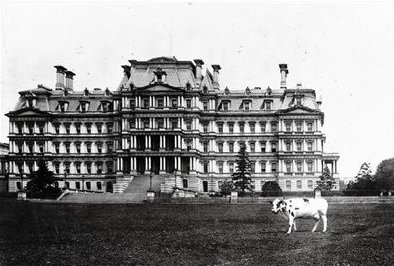
President William Howard Taft's cow, Pauline, in front of the Navy Building, which is known today as the Eisenhower Executive Office Building

The Holstein Friesian is an international breed or group of breeds of dairy cattle. This use of Holstein is found twice in history:

- In Britain it was used (with "Dutch" as synonym) to indicate the imported cattle ancestral to the shorthorn; a significant proportion of those animals did come from Holstein.
- In modern US English it refers to animals based almost exclusively on stock from the Netherlands. This use goes back to the use of "Holstein" in the title of a very influential article by Winthrop W. Chenery, the Massachusetts resident who purchased the US's first Holland cow from a Dutch sailing master in 1852.

At least in the United Kingdom, whereas the Friesian and Holstein breeds are considered separate, they are also considered so similar that it is not possible to distinguish between them for statistical purposes. Friesian is much the more common term in the UK.

== Specifications ==
An average Holstein cow in the United States produces about 22,000 pounds (10,000 kg) of milk per annum. This is roughly equivalent to 2650 U.S. gallons (10,000 litres). European Holstein cows tend to average 7,000 - 8,000 litres per year. The difference is due to the American practice of dosing dairy cattle with hormones which is outlawed in Europe. Lifetime yield of Holstein cows tends to average around 30,000 litres regardless of the country or the system of milk production that is being used.

== Genetics ==
The Holstein breed has one of the biggest gene pools world-wide and thus genetic progress has been faster than in other dairy breeds. For this reason it is the breed of choice for most dairy farmers worldwide. Round Oak Rag Apple Elevation, a Holstein bull born in the United States in 1965, fathered over 70,000 offspring through artificial insemination. His descendants were selected for their conformity to the breed's standards and their ability to produce large quantities of milk. Elevation's genes are representated in a large percentage of the Holstein population worldwide. Cross breeding with other breeds is popular in some countries (New Zealand for example) to avail breeders of the benefits arising from hybrid vigour.

== Notable Holsteins ==
- Ubre Blanca, Fidel Castro's cow (1972–1985)
- Pauline Wayne, US president William Howard Taft's cow
- RORA Elevation, a prize-winning bull
- Kian (1997–2013), the first red Holstein bull whose semen has sold more than one million units worldwide
- Toystory (2001–2014), Holstein bull whose semen has sold more than 2.4 million units worldwide and has been estimated to have sired over 500,000 offspring
- Lulubelle III, who is shown on the cover of Atom Heart Mother

== Other sources ==
- Low, David (1845) On the Domesticated Animals of the British Islands: Comprehending the Natural and Economical History of Species and Varieties; the Description of the Properties of External Form; and Observations on the Principles and Practice of Breeding, Longman, Brown, Green, & Longmans.
