= Ferber =

Ferber is a surname. Notable people with the surname include:

- Albert Ferber (1911–1987), Swiss pianist
- Brenda A. Ferber (born 1969), American children's book author
- Christine Ferber (born 1960), French pastry chef
- Edna Ferber (1885–1968), American novelist, author and playwright
- Ferdinand Ferber (1862–1909), French Army captain who played an important role in the development of aeroplanes
- Herbert Ferber (1906–1991), American sculptor and painter
- Markus Ferber (born 1965), German politician
- Marianne Ferber (1923–2013), American feminist economist and author
- Mauritius Ferber (1471–1537), bishop of Ermland
- Mel Ferber (1922–2003), Emmy-nominated TV director and producer
- Nicolaus Ferber (1485–1534), German Franciscan and controversialist
- Richard Ferber, American physician, inventor of the Ferber method
- Tzvi Hirsch Ferber (1879–1966), Rabbi

== See also ==
- Ferber IX or Antoinette III, an early experimental aircraft designed by Ferdinand Ferber
- Ferber method or Ferberization, a technique invented by Dr. Richard Ferber to solve infant sleep problems
- New York v. Ferber, a United States Supreme Court decision
- Faerber
- Farber
