= On Becoming Baby Wise =

1993 Christian parenting book by Gary Ezzo and Robert Bucknam

On Becoming Baby Wise: Giving Your Infant the Gift of Nighttime Sleep
- First edition cover
- Authors: Gary Ezzo; Robert Bucknam
- Language: English
- Subject: Early parenting
- Publication place: United States
- Media type: Print
- Pages: 160 (1993); 279 (2012)

On Becoming Baby Wise: Giving Your Infant the Gift of Nighttime Sleep is a Christianity-based infant management book written by Gary Ezzo and pediatrician Robert Bucknam in 1993. Baby Wise presents an infant care program which the authors say will cause babies to sleep through the night beginning between seven and nine weeks of age. It emphasizes parental control of the infant's sleep, play and feeding schedule rather than allowing the baby to decide when to eat, play and sleep.

The Baby Wise program outlined in the book came under criticism from pediatricians and parents who were concerned that an infant reared using the book's advice will be at higher risk of failure to thrive, malnutrition, and emotional disorders. The American Academy of Pediatrics (AAP) warned against the book, stating that its advice could result in infant development problems such as dehydration, poor weight gain, slow growth, delayed development and failure to thrive, as well as lack of milk supply in the new mother and involuntary weaning of the infant. The Babywise series of books was observed to be in direct contradiction to the AAP's own policy statement, "Breastfeeding and the Use of Human Milk," which recommends 8–12 nursing sessions every 24 hours for newborns, feeding until the baby is sated.

== History ==
=== Religious ===
In the late 1960s, Gary Ezzo studied at Mohawk Valley Community College in New York state, but did not earn a degree. In 1983, he enrolled at Talbot School of Theology in a program giving a Master of Arts degree in Christian ministry to people who did not hold a lower degree, but had already been active in ministry for two years. In 1984, Ezzo and his wife Anne Marie Ezzo began teaching parenting classes at Grace Community Church in Sun Valley, California; a 10,000-member evangelical megachurch. Anne Marie Ezzo was raising two children at the time and had for a short while trained as a nurse in a hospital pediatric unit.

In 1984, Anne Marie Ezzo wrote a four-page paper "Parent Controlled Feeding". In 1985, Gary Ezzo received his Master of Arts degree emphasizing Christian Education from Talbot. Subsequently, the Ezzos continued to investigate early parenting and with five other couples formed Growing Families International (GFI), organizing as a non-profit in 1987 and becoming a for-profit in 1989. Based on the earlier paper the Ezzos wrote a Christian parenting guide for GFI: Preparation for Parenting: Bringing God's Order to Your Baby's Day and Restful Sleep to Your Baby's Night. The book was published in 1990. Grace Community Church was initially supportive of the Ezzos and their parenting ministry, but in 1997 after four years of discussion, the church reversed its position, criticizing them for creating a divisive atmosphere between parents following the book's practices and those who favored demand feeding for infants, sleeping with their infants, and sling-type carriers for babies. The church elders banned the books for "stifling the mother's desire to comfort her children", for ascribing Biblical qualities to the concept of scheduled feeding, and for failing to address the church's concerns regarding theological issues. The Ezzos left the church along with a few sympathetic families.

The infant-rearing investigation the Ezzos conducted was performed by GFI and not published or subject to peer review. In training the infant to follow the recommended eating and sleeping schedule, their method expected that at certain times the infant would be left alone to cry when hungry or wakeful. The book justified the act of leaving a baby to cry alone by comparing that choice to the crucifixion of Jesus: "Praise God that the Father did not intervene when His Son cried out on the cross." The Ezzos wrote that leaving the infant "crying for 15, 20, even 30 minutes is not going to hurt your baby physically or emotionally." To counter the book's conclusions, Laura Bassi Zaff, an expert in childhood cognitive development, wrote that careful research has shown that leaving a baby crying may result in emotional harm, perhaps manifesting as "attachment disorder, or anxiety disorder, or crippling problems with self-esteem and interpersonal relationships".

=== Secular ===
Later editions of the book separated "Babywise" into two words.

To create a secular version of the book, Gary Ezzo partnered with Robert Bucknam, a pediatrician from Louisville, Colorado, to write On Becoming Babywise: More Than a Survival Guide which appeared in 1993. A pediatrician for less than a year, Bucknam first heard of the Ezzos while taking a class for new parents. He has been described in Babywise materials as a faculty member of the University of Colorado School of Medicine, but Christianity Today wrote that "three sources" at the medical school confirmed Bucknam had never been hired as faculty.

Ezzo and Bucknam wrote a new edition published in 1995: On Becoming Baby Wise: Learn How Over 100,000 Babies Were Trained to Sleep Through the Night the Natural Way—this edition used the single word "Babywise", later split into two words: "Baby Wise". Further editions of the book were published in 1998, 2001, and 2007. Changes in the later editions include removing the assertion that the risk of sudden infant death syndrome (SIDS) is not heightened by placing the baby to sleep on its belly, and removing the notion that feeding the baby whenever it appears hungry will give the mother "an abnormal hormonal condition" which could lead to postpartum depression.

== Summary ==
Baby Wise describes an infant management plan built around feed/play/sleep cycles. The authors term their approach to feeding "parent-directed feeding", or PDF: "Our conviction is that a baby should be fed when he or she signals readiness. With PDF, a mother feeds her baby when the baby is hungry, but she takes advantage of the first few weeks of life to guide the baby’s hunger patterns by a basic routine. This is cooperative parenting."

The book includes instructions for the care of babies from birth through six months. It primarily covers infant sleep and feeding practices, and emphasizes parental control of infant training. The infant is presented not as the defining center of the household but as a "welcome addition", subject to larger household order. The material presented in Baby Wise is a re-articulation of various practical methods which are reminiscent of parenting styles advocated by other Evangelical child-rearing advisers.

Ezzo and Bucknam describe their stance as a middle ground between feeding the baby on demand (when the baby indicates hunger) and feeding based on a strict clock schedule. In contrast to advice given by popular pediatrician William "Dr. Bill" Sears, the Baby Wise authors do not condone co-sleeping; Ezzo wrote, "The most serious sleep problems we've encountered are associated with parents who sleep with their babies."

The sleep advice given by Baby Wise is similar to Richard Ferber's advice given in his popular book Solve Your Child's Sleep Problems. The Ferber method of getting a baby to sleep similarly includes putting the baby to bed when awake. The baby is expected to learn how to fall asleep alone. Both methods warn the parents against using aids such as a pacifier to ease the baby into sleep, and both methods describe putting the infant to sleep without rocking, cuddling, or nursing applied for the sole purpose of putting child to sleep. "Crying it out" is expected from the infant during the early training periods, until about eight weeks of age.

A foundation of the book is that "great marriages produce great parents." Ezzo and Bucknam recommend that the new parents continue to schedule dates with each other and have friends over. The book was intended for mothers wearied by the demands of attachment parenting, in search of more freedom and time for themselves including the pursuit of careers and other interests. The book promises that following its plan "will not leave mom ragged at the end of the day nor in bondage to her child. Nor will Dad be excluded from his duties."

== Reception ==
Baby Wise has been criticized by mainstream health care professionals for giving dangerously wrong information about infant growth, feeding, sleep and development. Critics include, for example, T. Berry Brazelton, developer of the Neonatal Behavioral Assessment Scale; and Arnold Tanis, of the Florida Chapter of the American Academy of Pediatrics. The Baby Wise program has been associated with infantile failure to thrive, dehydration, malnutrition, problems with milk supply in breastfeeding mothers, and involuntary early weaning.

In 1998, Bill Sears, evangelical author, pediatrician, and clinical assistant professor of pediatrics at the Keck School of Medicine of USC, best known as the foremost proponent of attachment parenting, said of the book, "People began calling me about the stuff in this book several years ago, but I basically ignored it, thinking that it was so far out that it would just die out." Sears regretted not speaking out earlier, and said about the book that it was "probably the most dangerous program of teaching about babies and children that I have seen in my 25 years of being a pediatrician."

Ferber method founder Richard Ferber, Director of the Center for Pediatric Sleep Disorders at Children's Hospital Boston, concurs with Baby Wise regarding some of its sleep advice, but he warns against expecting too much. Baby Wise predicts that the 8-week-old child will be sleeping 7 to 8 hours in a row at night, and the 13-week-old child increasing the nighttime sleep period to as much as 11 hours. Ferber said, "Parents shouldn't expect babies to sleep that long that early, although a very few will on their own" and says that the book may frustrate parents of babies that are not sleeping so much; the parents may wonder what is wrong with the infant. Ferber says that if a baby sleeps through the night, the parents may actually need to wake it for feeding.

James Dobson, founder of the Focus on the Family ministry, commented on the controversial book, saying "I've never attacked it, but I don't endorse it... I'm not out campaigning against the Ezzos; I'm just not their greatest fan."

In response to the controversy, Multnomah Books stopped publishing the text in September 2001. They returned the book rights to GFI. Subsequent printings have been produced by Parent-Wise Solutions, an imprint formed by the Ezzos to publish their books.

== Editions ==
- (1990) Preparation for Parenting: Bringing God's Order to Your Baby's Day and Restful Sleep to Your Baby's Night, Growing Families International, ISBN 9781883035099 (Christian edition, written by Gary and Anne Marie Ezzo)
- (1993) On Becoming Babywise: More Than a Survival Guide, Growing Families International, ISBN 1-883035-99-6 (1st secular edition)
- (1995) On Becoming Baby Wise: Learn How Over 100,000 Babies Were Trained to Sleep Through the Night the Natural Way, Multnomah Books, ISBN 0-88070-775-5
- (1998) On Becoming Baby Wise: Learn How Over 500,000 Babies Were Trained to Sleep Through the Night the Natural Way, Multnomah Books, ISBN 1-57673-458-7
- (2001) On Becoming Baby Wise: The Classic Sleep Reference Guide Utilized by Over 1,000,000 Parents World-Wide, Parent-Wise Solutions, ISBN 0-9714532-0-9
- (2007) On Becoming Baby Wise: Giving Your Infant the Gift of Nighttime Sleep, Parent-Wise Solutions, ISBN 1-932740-08-2
- (2012) On Becoming Baby Wise: Giving Your Infant the Gift of Nighttime Sleep, Parent-Wise Solutions, ISBN 1-932740-13-9
