= Osasu Edobor =

Nigerian gender and development practitioner

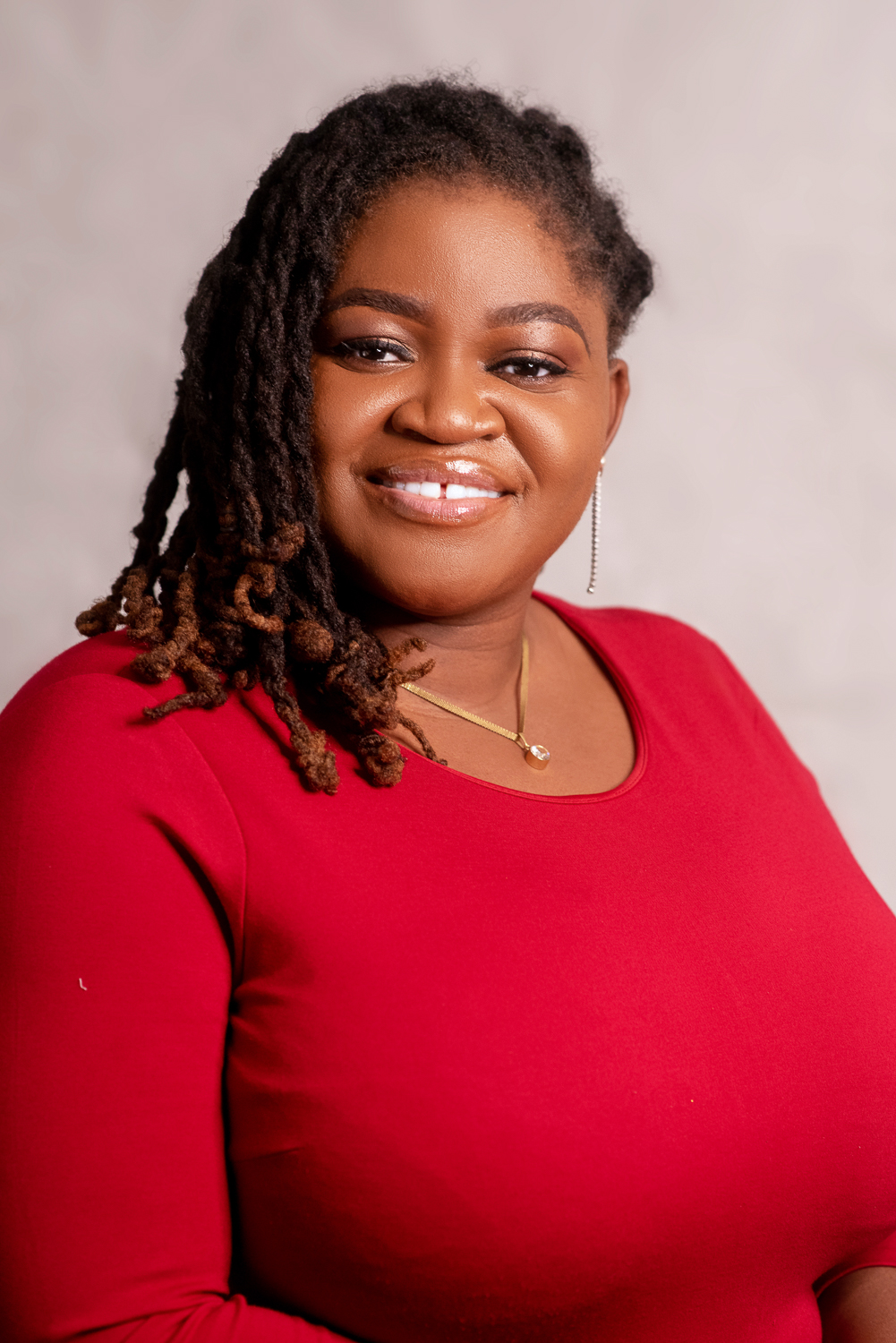
- Born: Benin City, Edo State
- Education: Chemistry - Lagos State University; Social Sector Management - Lagos Business School; Pan-Atlantic University; Psychology Managerial - University of Lagos
- Occupation: Nigerian gender advocate
- Known for: Gender inclusion activist and curator of HERFessions app
- Notable work: HERFessions; Founder of Think Help Restore (THR) Media and the Safe Space Initiative

Osasu Edobor (formerly known as Osasu Paul-Azino) is a Nigerian gender advocate and founder of Think Help Restore (THR) Media and the Safe Space Initiative. She is a licensed mental health first-aider, peer educator trainer, and counselor. As a campaigner for gender inclusion, Edobor created the HERFessions app, which provides support for survivors of sexual abuse. She is a 2018 Mandela Washington Fellow alumna and a Young African Leaders Initiative member.

== Education ==
Edobor completed a bachelor's degree in Chemistry at the Lagos State University in 2008 and a certificate in Social Sector Management from Lagos Business School, Pan-Atlantic University in 2016. Thereafter, she proceeded to the University of Lagos and earned a master’s degree in Managerial psychology. As a Mandela Washington Fellowship Scholar, she earned a Civic Leadership certificate from Rutgers University, New Brunswick in 2018.

== Career ==
Edobor worked as the program director at Pastor Bimbo Odukoya Foundation (PBOF), a nonprofit organization committed to supporting and training women and youth in disadvantaged areas. As program director, she inaugurated the S.H.A.RP4U project, a campaign to raise awareness of sexual harassment and counsel rape victims in tertiary institutions in Nigeria. Edobor spearheaded the 2016 edition of the PBOF girl empowerment program, held in commemoration of the International Day of the Girl Child.

Currently, she is the founder and director of programs at THR Media, a social enterprise that uses new technology and media to help women and girls escape sexual and gender-based violence, including domestic violence, trafficking, and other forms of exploitation. Edobor launched the HERFessions mobile application in 2018.

The app is an anonymous platform designed to assist victims and survivors of sexual and gender-based violence. The platform includes an online chat room that enables survivors to interact with one another and consult with psychologists, lawyers, and other stakeholders interested in educating, supporting and counseling victims of gender-based violence. The app has a button to report abuse.

Edobor hosts quarterly events aimed at supporting victims of sexual and gender-based violence through the Safe Space Initiative.

As an activist and gender advocate, Edobor joined the coalition of gender advocates to demand investigation of rape allegations and justice for rape victims.

== Awards ==
- 2018 Mandela Fellow, Civic Leadership
- 2022, HILL Accelerator winner
