= Willis J. Potts =

American pediatric surgeon

- Potts in 1955
- Born: March 22, 1895; Sheboygan, Wisconsin
- Died: May 5, 1968 (aged 73); Sarasota, Florida
- Education: Rush Medical College
- Medical career
- Field: Pediatric surgery
- Institutions: Children's Memorial Hospital
- Sub-specialties: Cardiovascular surgery

Willis John Potts (March 22, 1895 – May 5, 1968) was an American pediatric surgeon and one of the earliest physicians to focus on the surgical treatment of heart problems in children. Potts set up one of the country's first pediatric surgery programs at Children's Memorial Hospital (later renamed Lurie Children's Hospital) in Chicago.

A graduate of the University of Chicago and Rush Medical College, Potts was known for introducing a surgery to address the heart defects that resulted in blue baby syndrome; the procedure became known as the Potts shunt. In addition, Potts performed the first successful repair of a cardiovascular abnormality known as a pulmonary artery sling. He also invented several surgical instruments, with a particular emphasis on devices used in surgery on major blood vessels.

Potts remained a surgeon at Children's Memorial Hospital and a faculty member at the Northwestern University Medical School well into the 1960s. He retired to Sarasota, Florida, where he died of a heart attack at the age of 73.

== Early life ==
Born in 1895 in Sheboygan, Wisconsin, Potts moved with his family to a farm in nearby Cedar Grove when he was four years old. After his father died, Potts and an older brother ran the farm. Once he earned enough money, he enrolled in a private school in Cedar Grove and then studied at Hope College in Michigan. Potts, who had learned Dutch from his grandparents, studied Latin, Greek and German at Hope. During his senior year there, he joined the U.S. Chemical Warfare Service and fought overseas in World War I.

After the war, Potts resumed his studies in Chicago in 1919. He graduated from the University of Chicago with a Bachelor of Science. (Upon his graduation, Hope College awarded him a Bachelor of Arts.) Potts applied to medical school at the University of Chicago, which at that time involved two years at the University of Chicago and two years at Rush Medical College. He was one chemistry credit short of the requirements for admission to medical school, but chemistry department head Julius Stieglitz allowed him to complete the credit if he could submit the required work in the 18 days that were left the university's academic term.

== Medical career ==
=== Beginnings ===
Having completed the chemistry course, Potts was able to enroll in medical school. He held a job at a restaurant so that he could afford school. After graduating from medical school, he undertook general surgery training at Presbyterian Hospital in Chicago and at Rush Medical College. In 1925, Potts opened a general practice as a physician and surgeon in Oak Park, Illinois. He did not make much money at first, but by 1930 he had sufficient funds to go to Frankfurt for further surgical training.

After spending 1930 and 1931 in Frankfurt, Potts returned to Chicago and practiced general surgery there for several years. In 1942, he went to the Pacific to serve in World War II, setting up the 25th Evacuation Hospital. When he was discharged three years later as a colonel.

=== Return to Chicago ===
Returning to Chicago after World War II, Potts decided to focus on problems in pediatric surgery. He worked briefly as Chief of Surgery at West Suburban Hospital. In late 1946, he was appointed Surgeon-in-Chief at Children's Memorial Hospital (CMH). His position came with a faculty appointment at the Northwestern University Medical School.

At the time of Potts' appointment at CMH, only a few childhood illnesses could be addressed surgically; appendicitis and pyloric stenosis were two of the most common pediatric surgical problems. Potts recruited experts in several surgical specialties and asked them to commit themselves to developing surgical solutions for pediatric problems. As he was setting up the pediatric surgery program, Potts went to Boston Children's Hospital for three months to observe the workings of that pediatric surgery program.

=== The Potts shunt ===
Potts spent considerable time thinking about the surgical correction of heart defects. Working with CMH pediatric cardiologist Stanley Gibson and with pathologist Joseph Boggs, Potts helped create a collection of more than 200 anatomic specimens of various heart defects. The collection was later used extensively by cardiovascular pathologist Maurice Lev.

Potts, Gibson, and research fellow Sidney Smith became interested in treating blue baby syndrome, the group of heart defects that result in insufficient blood flow to the lungs. They became intrigued by the idea of somehow connecting the aorta (the body's largest artery, which sends blood to all of the body's tissues) to the nearby pulmonary artery (which sends blood to the lungs). In 1946, Potts and Smith devised an operation for blue baby syndrome. The surgery involved making a tiny incision in the aorta and a tiny incision in the pulmonary artery and then sewing the two openings together. They performed the procedure successfully on 30 dogs before Gibson sent them a 19-month-old patient named Diane Schnell. Schnell was turning blue and fainting frequently. The team felt that she would not live much longer without surgery, so they decided to make her the first patient to receive a Potts shunt. She did well after the surgery and was known to be alive and well in the late 1960s.

Potts, Smith and Gibson published an article in JAMA: The Journal of the American Medical Association in November 1946 in which they described saving three children's lives. They wrote that the new Potts shunt was safer than the standard treatment at the time, the Blalock-Taussig shunt, which sometimes resulted in paralysis or death.

=== Other contributions, awards and recognition ===
In 1953, Potts was the first surgeon to successfully repair a pulmonary artery sling, an abnormality in which the lung blood vessels wrap around and compress the patient's windpipe. The patient who underwent this first repair was a five-month-old girl. She was still alive at nearly 25 years of age; like many of the patients who underwent Potts' version of this repair, she had decreased blood flow to the left lung, but she was doing well. Potts and his team also advanced the treatment of a heart defect known as transposition of the great arteries.

Potts' work with heart surgery included the invention of at least three surgical devices. His neighbor, Bruno Richter, worked for a medical instrument manufacturer and assisted him with these innovations. The Potts-Smith aortic exclusion clamp closed off only a portion of the aorta so that the Potts shunt could be completed while maintaining blood flow to the spinal cord. He also developed the Potts vascular clamp, which allowed vessels to be clamped without being crushed; this moved vascular surgery forward significantly. A third device, the pulmonary valvulotome, helped surgeons to minimize bleeding when they entered the right ventricle to repair a child's pulmonary valve.

Non-cardiac surgical problems in children also interested Potts. Imperforate anus was one of his special clinical interests. Potts made technical improvements to the surgery that was used for infant girls who had imperforate anus with a low rectovaginal fistula. In 1959, he attempted the separation of a set of conjoined twins who shared a heart. Both twins were weakening, but Potts hoped to save the stronger of the two; the child died within four hours of the procedure. He consulted on another case of conjoined twins the next year, but he declined to operate because he felt that the surgery had no chance of success.

In 1955, Potts wrote an editorial in JAMA in which he criticized the overall quality of pediatric surgical care in the United States. Potts pointed out that despite the proliferation of U.S. children's hospitals, only eight hospitals had pediatric surgery programs run by full-time pediatric surgeons. He noted that there were only 33 members of the surgical section of the American Academy of Pediatrics and that 12 of those members had practices that were not fully focused on children. While he acknowledged that increasing levels of specialization created new challenges in medical education, he said that parents would soon demand the same quality of care for their children as they did for themselves.

Potts served as the president of several medical organizations, including the Institute of Medicine of Chicago, the Chicago Surgical Society and the Chicago Heart Association. He won several awards, including an American Medical Association Gold Medal and the William E. Ladd Medal from the American Academy of Pediatrics. In 1964, Hope College awarded an honorary Doctor of Science to Potts.

== Personal life ==
A Unitarian, Potts was deeply religious. Colleague Thomas Baffes wrote that Potts was "comfortable enough in his relationship with his God and secure enough in his technical excellence and genius not to feel threatened by the ambitious young people he attracted about him." A 1965 newspaper article called him "probably the world's only hymn-singing surgeon", noting that he might sing "Nobody Knows the Trouble I've Seen" during a difficult surgery versus "Jesus Loves Me" during an easy case.

Potts married Henrietta Neeken in 1922, and they had three children. In 1948, Potts' son, a married 21-year-old father of two, disappeared from the University of Rochester for about two months before he was located in Texas.

== Later life ==
Potts wrote two books, The Surgeon and the Child (1959) and Your Wonderful Baby (1966). In 1960, he gave up his administrative duties at CMH to devote his time to patient care, but he said that he looked to his younger colleagues to complete the difficult surgeries. Open heart surgery had become common by this time, and Potts said that it should be performed "by young men whose fingers are nimble, whose minds are agile, and whose coronaries are pliable." In June 1965, a retirement celebration was held for Potts at the Sheraton Blackstone Hotel; some of Potts' former "blue babies" were among the 300 people who honored Potts that night.

When Potts retired, he moved to Sarasota, Florida. Potts' congenital heart surgery research center was renamed in his honor. In a 1966 interview with the Associated Press, Potts warned about the risks of antibiotic misuse in treating colds and similar illnesses. He died of a heart attack in 1968; influenza had also contributed to his death. He was predeceased by two brothers and a sister, and he was survived by a sister, his wife, three children and 14 grandchildren.

== Legacy ==
Potts made early and important advances in pediatric surgery, though the surgical shunt bearing his name has been mostly replaced by other surgical techniques. Over time, surgeons found it difficult to judge the appropriate size for a Potts shunt; they were often made either too small (resulting in insufficient blood flow to the lungs and continued hypoxia) or too large (resulting in too much blood flow to the lungs and congestive heart failure). Some babies with a Potts shunt experienced aneurysm formation in the left pulmonary artery and others had severe bleeding when surgeons attempted to "take down" the shunt.

Since the early 21st century, the Potts shunt has occasionally been brought back into use as a palliative treatment for children with pulmonary arterial hypertension.
