= Farber =

Farber is a surname. Notable people with the surname include:

- Barry Farber (1930–2020), American radio talk show host
- Barry J. Farber, American motivational speaker
- Bernie Farber (born 1951), former CEO of Canadian Jewish Congress
- Celia Farber (born c. 1965), American print journalist and author
- David J. Farber (1934–2026), American professor of computer science
- Dennis H. Farber (1946–2017), American painter and photographer
- Eduard Farber (1892–1969), Austrian-American chemist and historian of chemistry
- Emmanuel Farber (1918–2014), Canadian-American physician, pathologist, biochemist, and oncologist
- Hap Farber (born 1948), American football player
- Jerry Farber (born 1935), American educator and writer
- Manny Farber (1917–2008), American painter, film critic and writer
- Marvin Farber (1901–1980), American philosopher
- Norma Farber (1909–1984), American children's book writer and poet
- Robert Farber (disambiguation), multiple people
- Sam Farber (1924–2013), American industrial designer and businessman
- Samuel Farber (born 1939), American writer born and raised in Cuba
- Sasha Farber (born 1984), professional dancer on Dancing with the Stars
- Sidney Farber (1903–1973), "father" of modern chemotherapy
- Stacey Farber (born 1987), Canadian actress
- Zulima Farber (born 1944), former Attorney General, Acting Governor of New Jersey

== Fictional characters ==
- Chris Farber, a character in the 1994 American TV miniseries V The Final Battle

== See also ==
- Faerber, also spelled Färber, a surname
- Ferber
- Dana–Farber Cancer Institute
- Farber disease
