= Linda E. Ginzel =

- Born: Linda E. Ginzel; June 13, 1959 (age 67); Seoul, South Korea
- Education: University of Colorado at Denver(BA); Princeton University (MA/PhD)
- Occupations: Social Psychologist, Activist, Educator, Author
- Spouse: Boaz Keysar

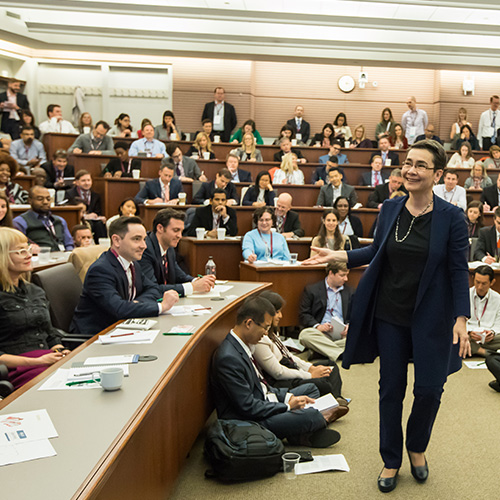

Linda E. Ginzel is a Clinical Professor of Managerial Psychology at the University of Chicago Booth School of Business and the founder of the Customized Executive Education program. She researches, develops curricula, and teaches courses on negotiation, effective leadership, and organizational behavior. Ginzel is a two-time recipient of the James S. Kemper Jr. Grant in Business Ethics.

Ginzel is also the co-founder and president of Kids In Danger, a nonprofit organization which works to protect and promote the welfare and rights of consumers regarding children's product safety. In 2000, President Bill Clinton awarded Ginzel with the President's Volunteer Service Award for her work in national public safety.

== Biography ==
Ginzel was born in Seoul, South Korea, but spent her childhood between the United States and Germany.

She received a bachelor's degree in psychology from the University of Colorado Denver in 1984, earning both distinction and summa cum laude. In 1986, she earned an M.A. in Social Psychology from Princeton University, and later went on to earn a Ph.D. in social psychology from Princeton University in 1989. During her time at Princeton University, she studied with Edward E. Jones. Prior to her academic career, Ginzel held various positions. She worked at Montgomery Ward, served as a hair salon receptionist, managed an apartment complex, and was a life insurance saleswoman.

From 1989 to 1992, she was an assistant professor of organizational behavior at the Stanford University Graduate School of Business. Then from 1991 to 1992, she was visiting assistant professor of organizational behavior at the Kellogg Graduate School of Management, Northwestern University.

In 1992, Ginzel joined University of Chicago Booth School of Business as a senior lecturer in behavioral sciences. Since 1998, she has worked as a clinical professor of managerial psychology for the university. In addition, Ginzel is a charter member of the Association for Psychological Science and a member of the Academy of Management.

== Academic work ==
Ginzel leads programs and teaches Master of Business Administration (MBA) and executive education courses in leadership capital, high-performance leadership, the social psychology of management, essentials of effective leadership, managerial psychology, negotiations, and decision-making.

=== Previous work ===
Ginzel established the Corporate Executive Education Program at the University of Chicago Booth School of Business. From 1995 to 2004, she managed and grew a custom-designed program, which now ranks number one in the world for Executive Education Programs. Ginzel has also designed and taught customized educational programs for a number of Fortune 500 companies.

In the past, she has taught courses on organizational behavior, interpersonal perception, attribution theory, psychology and social psychology to both MBA and Ph.D. students at Kellogg graduate School of Management, Stanford School of Busine, and Princeton University.

=== Negotiations and Decision-Making ===
Ginzel said, "Negotiation is the essential leadership skill for those creating a different future. It is the ultimate skill for problem solving. Entrepreneurs do that everyday." In her negotiation courses, Ginzel encourages her students to: 1) look for tradeoffs to create value, 2) enlarge the pie before dividing, 3) adapt their strategy to their counterpart's style, and 4) practice 'conditional' cooperation. Overall, her goal is for her students to gain a better understanding of the psychological processes that underlie the judgements made during negotiations and become better analytical negotiators. The MBA course has been taught to full-time, part-time, and executive MBA candidates at the University of Chicago Booth School of Business in Chicago and London.

In terms of decision making for individuals in business, Ginzel said, "I do not think that my advice is any different for women than for men in business. I tell all my students to be sure that they have a strong sense of their own priorities so that they do not end up making choices based on the priorities of others. I believe that who we become depends on the everyday choices that we make, and we must choose wisely.

=== Leadership Capital ===
In Ginzel's Leadership Capital course, she challenges students to address questions such as: What makes a good executive? What does a leader do to create and add value? How does management differ from leadership? What is the basis of management and leadership?

Defining "leadership capital" as "the wisdom to decide when to manage and when to lead together with the courage and capacity to implement," Ginzel teaches a framework geared towards developing a strategy of knowing when to change and when to maintain the status quo. Her framework includes the development of two types of skills: action skills and insight skills.

=== Choosing Leadership: A Workbook ===
Ginzel published her first book, "Choosing Leadership: A Workbook," in 2018. Ginzel decided to write the book after students from her leadership course began to ask for copies of class material to share with their coworkers and friends. Drawing from her materials for executive development courses, the book uses a personalized approach to developing leadership and management skills. Ginzel noted in the introduction: "Instead of thinking about people who are "leaders," think of the choices these people made to lead."

The workbook includes exercises and activities to encourage personal and professional growth, with the goal of "being wiser, younger." Concepts included within workbook exercises include developing personal definitions of leadership, leveraging the Zeigarnik effect, and leveraging data collection to maximize the value of past experiences.

"Choosing Leadership" has been featured in media such as the Chicago Booth CareerCast podcast, Chicago's WGN Radio, and the Association for Surgical Education podcast. In 2019, Forbes included "Choosing Leadership" in its list, "Top Life and Career Design Books to Plan Your Year," stating that the book was a "good option to create your own self-coaching leadership program."

"Choosing Leadership" has been incorporated into curricula for courses across disciplines. At the Indiana University Maurer School of Law, Professor William D. Henderson used "Choosing Leadership" as the core text in a Deliberative Leadership course.

== Consumer Advocacy ==
Along with her academic work, Ginzel also currently serves as the co-founder and president of the non-profit organization Kids in Danger. In 1998, Ginzel and her husband, Boaz Keysar, founded Kids in Danger after the death of their son, Danny Keysar, who was strangled by a previously recalled portable crib. Through their work with the organization, Ginzel and Keysar helped push the state of Illinois in banning the sale of recalled children's products in 1998 and were also key leaders in the enactment of the Children's Product Safety Act in Illinois in 1999.

In 2008, as members of the Advisory Committee on the Obama Transition Team, Ginzel and Keysar were instrumental in the creation of CPSC legislation that mandated changes in regulating children's products. The legislation included a provision, named after their son Danny, that put into effect tougher safety standards and compulsory testing for durable children's products. An extension of this CPSC legislation in 2012 included new rules for playpens that require independent testing for stability. At the announcement of this legislation, Ginzel said, "It is bittersweet for me to be standing here today," she said, "The fact that strong mandatory standards are now required by law is Danny's legacy and the legacy of other children whose lives have been lost so carelessly, so tragically." In short, Danny's Law required that manufacturers test toys and infant products before sale. It also banned lead and phthalates in toys.

Ginzel testified in the United States Congress and state legislatures throughout the country on the topic of children's product safety. Ginzel's work has been featured across mainstream media and publications including ABC Nightly News, Today Show, Oprah, Voice of America, Wall Street Journal, Newsweek, USA Today and People Magazine.

Currently, Ginzel volunteers as a consumer representative on the Consumer Products Committee F15 of ASTM International.

== Awards and recognition ==
- 2019: Hillel J. Einhorn Teaching Award for teaching in the Booth Singapore Executive MBA Program Asia
- 2014: Class of 2014 Impact Professor as voted by full-time students at the Booth School of Business
- 2014: The Hope and Courage Award, Lurie Children's Hospital in Chicago
- 2013: Inaugural Global Hillel Einhorn J. Einhorn Teaching Award as voted by Executive MBA students at the Booth School of Business across three campuses: Singapore, London and Chicago
- 2011: Faculty Excellence Award as voted by Evening and Weekend MBA students at the Booth School of Business for exceptional commitment to teaching, Chicago, Illinois[26]
- 2007-2008: Finalist, Faculty Pioneer Award, The Aspen Institute Center for Business Education, Washington, DC
- 2000: The President's Service Award, the nation's highest honor for volunteer service directed at solving critical social problems from President Clinton, Washington, DC
- 2000 & 2001: Two-time recipient of the James S. Kemper Jr. Grant in Business Ethics, The James S. Kemper Foundation, Chicago, Illinois
- 1998: Chicagoan of the Year, Chicago Magazine, Chicago, Illinois
- 1992: Honorable Mention, "Professor of the Year", The Manager's Program, Kellogg Graduate School of Management Northwestern University, Evanston, Illinois
- 1990: General Electric Foundation Faculty Grant Stanford University, Stanford, California
- 1990: Dispute Resolution Research Center Grant, with M. Bazerman Northwestern University, Evanston, Illinois
- 1989: Teaching Award for Excellence in Undergraduate Instruction Association of Princeton Graduate Alumni, Princeton University, Princeton, New Jersey
- 1985: Princeton University Merit Fellowship Princeton University, Princeton, New Jersey
- 1984: The Outstanding Graduate, College of Liberal Arts and Sciences The University of Colorado, Denver, Colorado
- 1984: Nell G. Fahrion Award for Excellence in Psychology The University of Colorado, Denver, Colorado
- 1983 & 1984: Two-time recipient of the Colorado Scholars Award The University of Colorado, Denver, Colorado

== Publications ==
- Zivan, D. (2002). “The Playskool Travel-Lite Crib,” Edited by L. Ginzel.
  - Also from: The National Academy of Engineering, Online Ethics Center and
  - CasePlace.org the online service of The Aspen Institute and
  - McGraw-Hill's electronic publishing system, the Primis database.
    - Also appears in: Ferrell, Fraedrich and Ferrell (2005) Business Ethics: Ethical Decision Making and Cases. Houghton Mifflin Co, pages 144–169.
  - McAlister, Ferrell and Ferrell (2005) Business and Society: A Strategic Approach to Social Responsibility. Houghton Mifflin Co, pages 167–189.
  - Nash, de Bettignies and Goodpaster (2006) Business Ethics: Policies and Persons. McGraw-Hill/Irwin, Inc., pages 287–303.
- Keysar, B., Ginzel, L. E., and Bazerman, M. H. (1995). “States of Affairs and States of Mind: The Effect of Knowledge about Beliefs." Organizational Behavior and Human Decision Processes, 64, pages 283–293.
- Ginzel, L. E. (1994). "The Impact of Biased Inquiry Strategies on Performance Judgments." Organizational Behavior and Human Decision Processes, 57, pages 411–429.
- Ginzel, L. E., Kramer, R. M., and Sutton, R. I. (1993). "Organizational Impression Management as a Reciprocal Influence Process: The Neglected Role of the Organizational Audience." In L. L. Cummings and B. M. Staw (Eds.), Research in Organizational Behavior, (Volume 15, pages 227–266). Greenwich, Connecticut: JAI Press.
  - Also appears in: M. J. Hatch and M. Schultz (Eds.), Organizational Identity: A Reader. Oxford University Press, 2004, pages 223–261.
- Hogarth, R. M., and Ginzel, L. E. (February, 1993). "'Soft Skills and Hard Knowledge." Training Today, pages 6–8.
- Kirby, P., and Ginzel, L. E. (August 1989). "A Trainer’s Dozen: Critical Professional and Program Issues." Training and Development Journal, pages 69–72.
- Ginzel, L. E., Jones, E. E., and Swann, W. B. Jr. (1987). "How 'Naive' is the Naive Attributor?: Discounting and Augmentation in Attitude Attribution." Social Cognition, 5, pages 108–130.
