= Sarwark =

Sarwark is a surname. Notable people with the surname include:

- John F Sarwark, American pediatrician
- Nicholas Sarwark (born 1979), American politician
