= Kids In Danger =

Kids in Danger (KID) was an American non-profit dedicated to educating parents, training engineers, designers, and manufacturers, and advocating for improvements in children's product safety in cribs, toys, bathtub seats, bunk beds, car seats, carriers, costumes, crib bumpers, high chairs, gates, play yards, strollers, walkers, and other potentially dangerous items. The organization closed its doors December 2024, and many of its primary projects are now housed with other organizations. For instance, the KID Design Safety Toolkit is now with the International Consumer Product Health and Safety Organization and the Recall Alerts are now distributed by Reese's Purpose. While KID was active, its website supplied listings of products recalled by the Consumer Product Safety Commission and provided suggestions and information on how to protect children. KID also worked alongside other groups such as the Consumer Federation of America and Consumer Reports in order to improve product safety. All of these groups - Consumer Federation of America, Consumer Reports, Reese Purpose and ICPHSO - continue to be resources on product safety.

== Background ==
KID was founded in 1998 by two professors at the University of Chicago, Linda Ginzel and Boaz Keysar, after their son Danny was killed by a crib that had been recalled five years previously. Danny's parents resolved to take action and founded KID. Congressman Bobby L. Rush and Senator Dick Durbin, both of Illinois, held hearings on the topic of dangerous children's toys in June, 2007 at which KID's Executive Director Nancy Cowles testified along with Illinois Attorney General Lisa Madigan and others.

In 2005, Illinois passed legislation that required the Illinois Department of Public Health to place children's product recalls on its website as well as to link to the CPSC site

In September, 2007, the head of the CPSC testified on product safety in Congress and one report noted "After years of sparsely attended congressional hearings, Nancy A. Nord, acting chairman of the CPSC, was greeted by a standing-room-only crowd at her September appearance before a Senate subcommittee. By then, retailers had begun retesting their inventory and recalls of lead-laced toys became almost daily events."

The Consumer Product Safety Commission began to act on lead in children's toys in January, 2008. KID's Cowles observed that quicker action in this area "would have made safer products available sooner".

== Mission ==
KID's mission was to save lives by enhancing transparency and accountability through safer product development, better education and stronger advocacy for children. KID focused on three primary areas: education, training, and advocacy. KID educated parents and caregivers in how to protect their children with a three-step program that includes: 1-Learning about recalls through checking with consumer agencies such as the Consumer Product Safety Commission and at KID's site, 2-Searching inside the home for dangerous products and 3-Staying alert to potential problems and making others aware of what has become known.

Secondly, KID actively participated in programs that promote training in this area for a variety of groups. "Safe from the Start" (SFTS) is a program that works with healthcare professionals, caregivers and parents to spread information about children's product safety. In 2009, KID launched The Debby Sayah Grandparent Outreach Project to target information towards grandparents.

Finally, KID advocated for increased awareness and proactive testing of children's products. The program "Teach Early Safety Testing" targets designers and engineers who create and develop children's products. In addition, "Test It Now" is a grassroots awareness campaign for ensuring that the public is aware of current dangerous practices, encouraging policymakers to produce change, and challenging the Consumer Product Safety Commission to sharpen its current operations.

== Research and publications ==
KID published annual reviews of recalled products to promote awareness of potential hazards to children. In addition, KID writes reports on more specific product hazards such as fire risks and lead poisoning.

In 2019, KID's annual report on recall products was used to support the Stop Tip-overs of Unstable, Risky Dressers on Youth (STURDY) Act. Representative Jan Schakowsky (D, IL), planned to introduce the Sturdy Act to Congress. Another KID report found that child product companies often neglect to post recall notices on their official social media accounts, limiting the effectiveness of recalls.

== Context on children's product safety ==
KID produced monthly newsletters that covered recent developments and recalls in children's products. In depth research on product safety topics is another ongoing project of the group. Funded by an ethics grant from the Kemper Foundation, a case study entitled The Playskool Travel-Lite Crib was published. A book entitled It's No Accident, was written on this topic.

State legislators have passed and are in various stages of passing laws known generally as "The Children's Product Safety Act." One feature of these laws is the prohibition on the sale or lease of any children's product that has been recalled. Illinois, for example, passed this legislation in 1999. Arkansas, in addition to passing its Child Product Safety Act, maintains a special website that provides details on the legislation, recalls by year, recalls by category, and recalls by company.

In late July, 2008, federal legislators reached agreement on improving children's product safety. The course of KID's role in the legislation and the portion of the law named in honor of Danny Keysar was described in the Chicago Tribune as follows:

Ginzel has spent the last decade pushing for tougher testing of children's products before they're sold and more effective ways of sweeping dangerous products off store shelves. ... "We'd rather have our son," Ginzel said, choking up. "But whatever we can do to protect other families-it's not really a choice we can make. It's something we have to do". ... That part of the law (named after Danny Keysar) forces the US Consumer Product Safety Commission to enact tougher safety rules for durable nursery products, including cribs, and requires that manufacturers test their products to those standards before they're sold.
