= Pulmonary artery sling =

- Specialty: Cardiology

Pulmonary artery sling (PAS) is a rare congenital vascular anomaly where the left pulmonary artery (LPA) originates abnormally from the right pulmonary artery (RPA) instead of the main pulmonary artery. This aberrant course causes the LPA to pass between the trachea and esophagus. PAS caused by an embryological malformation and is frequently associated with other congenital anomalies, particularly affecting the airway and heart. Advanced imaging techniques such as CT, MRI, echocardiography, and bronchoscopy are essential for diagnosing PAS and identifying associated abnormalities. Surgical repair in early childhood is the standard treatment, aimed at relieving airway compression and correcting the other associated defects.

The term "vascular sling" comes from the configuration where the LPA compresses distal trachea and right mainstem bronchus as it courses between the trachea and esophagus to reach the left lung. This anomaly is classified as a type of vascular ring, though it does not form a complete ring around the airway and esophagus.

Pulmonary artery sling was originally written about in 1897 by Glaevecke and Doehle. The first known case PAS was diagnosed and surgically repaired in 1953 by Dr. Willis J. Potts at Lurie Children's Hospital (formerly Children's Memorial Hospital). He performed the procedure on a 5-month-old infant. Although the surgery was technically successful, follow-up imaging revealed limited blood flow to the left lung, highlighting the early challenges of managing this complex anomaly.

== Embryology and associated anomalies ==
PAS arises due to abnormal embryologic development, specifically a failure of proper formation of the left sixth aortic arch. As a result, the left pulmonary artery (LPA) originates anomalously from the right pulmonary artery (RPA), which retains its normal position. The LPA then takes an aberrant course: it arises anterior to the right main bronchus near its origin from the trachea, then passes between the trachea and esophagus before reaching the left pulmonary hilum. This aberrant path forms the characteristic vascular sling, which can compress the airway and lead to significant clinical symptoms.

Pulmonary artery sling is frequently associated with other congenital anomalies including: tracheal anomalies, cardiovascular anomalies, gastrointestinal anomalies, and others.

Tracheal stenosis also known as tracheomalacia and complete tracheal rings are the most commonly associated congenital anomalies in patients with PAS. Approximately 50% to 79% of patients with PAS have congenital tracheal stenosis due to the presence of complete cartilaginous tracheal rings, which can significantly contribute to airway obstruction and respiratory symptoms.

Approximately 30% of patients with PAS have associated congenital cardiac anomalies. Commonly associated defects include atrial septal defect (ASD), ventricular septal defect (VSD), tetralogy of Fallot (TOF), and aortic coarctation. Other cardiovascular anomalies include left superior vena cava, aberrant right subclavian, coarctations. Among these, tetralogy of Fallot is the most frequently associated anomaly. Other cardiovascular abnormalities that may be present include a persistent left superior vena cava, aberrant right subclavian artery, and coarctation of the aorta.

Gastrointestinal anomalies associated with PAS may include duodenal atresia, biliary atresia, Meckel's diverticulum, and Hirschsprung disease. These coexisting abnormalities can further complicate the clinical picture and may require additional evaluation and management.

Right lung agenesis may also occur in association with PAS, often accompanied by failure of development of the right mainstem bronchus, further contributing to respiratory compromise. Additionally, PAS can be part of broader syndromic associations, including VACTERL syndrome (vertebral defects, anal atresia, cardiac anomalies, tracheoesophageal fistula, renal anomalies, and limb abnormalities). Other genetic syndromes reported in association with PAS include Down syndrome, Holt-Oram syndrome, and Kartagener syndrome, indicating the importance of comprehensive genetic and systemic evaluation in affected patients.

== Symptoms and evaluation ==
Patients with PAS often become symptomatic in infancy or early childhood with the majority presenting within the first year of life. The condition typically causes airway compression due to the abnormal origin and course of the left pulmonary artery (LPA), which passes between the trachea and esophagus. Most symptoms are not specific, however, common symptoms can include: mild tachypnea, respiratory distress, stridor, wheezing, recurrent respiratory infections, feeding difficulties, cyanosis (especially in severe cases).

Because PAS is an anatomical defect and frequently associated with other congenital anomalies advanced imaging is essential for accurate diagnosis and evaluation.

All patients with PAS should undergo cross-sectional imaging such as CT or MRI to define vascular anatomy and identify associated anomalies. Given the common association with tracheal stenosis and complete tracheal rings, bronchoscopy is necessary to assess airway anatomy, mucosal detail, dynamic changes, and extrinsic compression. However, significant narrowing may limit the bronchoscope's ability to pass beyond the stenotic segment—making CT crucial for evaluating the distal airway.

Most diagnosis of PAS are made from echocardiography. An echocardiogram is also indicated to assess for associated congenital heart defects, which are present in a significant number of cases. While PAS is often first detected on echocardiography, a full diagnostic work-up—including CT, bronchoscopy, and echocardiography—is essential for surgical planning and management.

== Treatment ==
Early recognition of PAS is essential, as the severity of airway obstruction can vary and may necessitate surgical intervention. Surgery is typically performed via open-heart approach through a median sternotomy. All patients diagnosed with PAS should undergo a comprehensive preoperative work-up to determine the need and timing for surgical repair. The majority of surgical repairs are performed in neonates and infants, particularly those with congenital tracheal stenosis. The median age at surgery is between 7 and 9 months, though the range can span from 6 days to 27 months.

The primary goal of PAS is to LPA so that it no longer passes between the trachea and esophagus, thereby relieving airway compression. It is also critical to maintain adequate and durable blood flow to the left lung. Associated anomalies, such as congenital tracheal stenosis or intracardiac defects, can often be addressed during the same surgical procedure.

There are two main techniques are used for surgical correction of PAS: (1) reimplantation of the LPA into the main pulmonary artery and (2) tracheal transection with LPA translocation. Surgical access can be achieved via median sternotomy or a left thoracotomy approach. A 2012 study demonstrated that PAS is best repaired using a median sternotomy, cardiopulmonary bypass, and left pulmonary artery (LPA) reimplantation, which resulted in uniformly patent LPAs in all patients.
