= Robert Farber =

Robert Farber may refer to:

- Robert Farber (artist) (1948–1995), American artist and actor
- Robert Farber (photographer) (born 1944), American photographer
