= Niedermorschwihr =

Commune in Grand Est, France

- Commune
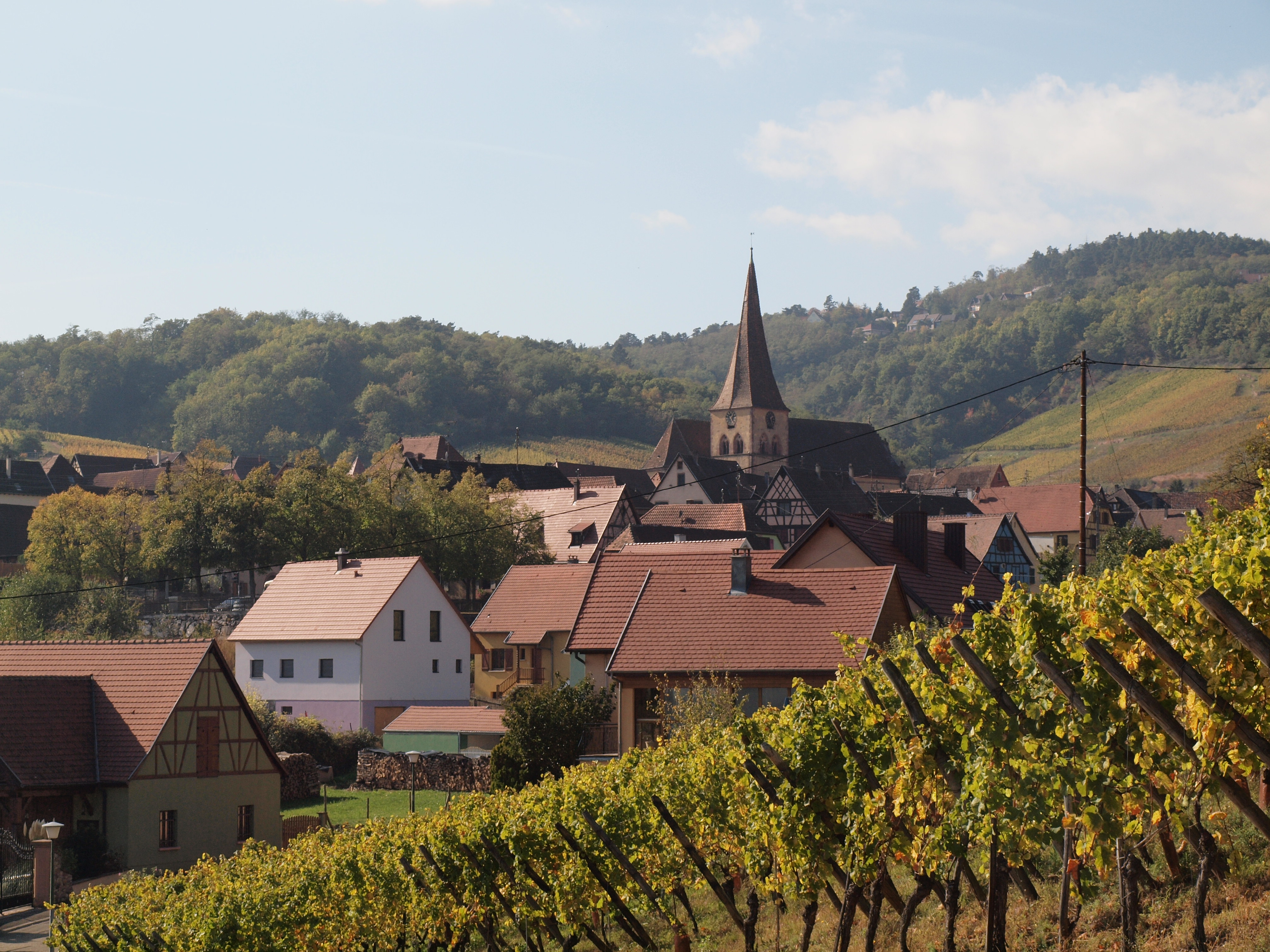
- A view of Niedermorschwihr

- Coat of arms
- Location of Niedermorschwihr
- Location within France Location within Grand Est
- Coordinates: 48°06′01″N 7°16′30″E
- Country: France
- Region: Grand Est
- Department: Haut-Rhin
- Arrondissement: Colmar-Ribeauvillé
- Canton: Wintzenheim
- Intercommunality: Colmar Agglomération

Government
  - Mayor (2020–2026): Daniel Bernard
- Area^{1}: 3.35 km^{2} (1.29 sq mi)
- Elevation: 330 m (1,080 ft)
- Highest elevation: 720 m (2,360 ft)
- Lowest elevation: 263 m (863 ft)
- Population (2023): 537
  - Density: 160/km^{2} (415/sq mi)
- Time zone: UTC+01:00 (CET)
  - Summer (DST): UTC+02:00 (CEST)
- INSEE/Postal code: 68237 /68230
- ^{1} French Land Register data, which excludes lakes, ponds, glaciers > 1 km^{2} (0.386 sq mi or 247 acres) and river estuaries.

Niedermorschwihr (German: Niedermorschweier) is a commune in the northeastern French department of Haut-Rhin.

== Notable people ==
- Christine Ferber, pastry chef and chocolatier

== See also ==
- Communes of the Haut-Rhin department
