= Nadia Dowshen =

American pediatrician

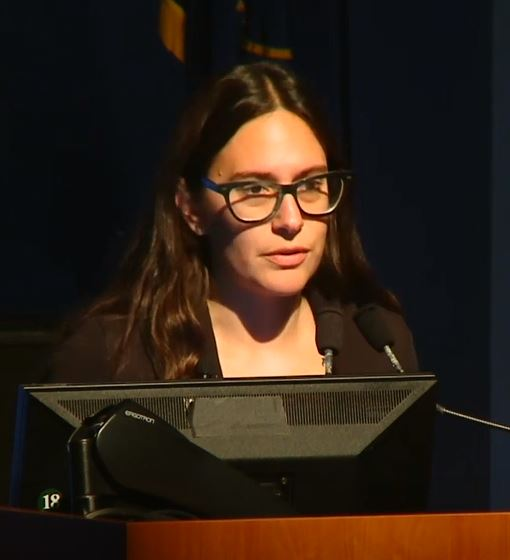
- Dowshen in December 2018
- Spouse: Alfred Atanda Jr.

Academic background
- Education: BA urban studies, 1999, MD, 2004, MSHP, 2016, Perelman School of Medicine at the University of Pennsylvania

Academic work
- Institutions: Children's Hospital of Philadelphia; Perelman School of Medicine at the University of Pennsylvania

Nadia Lauren Dowshen is an American pediatrician and adolescent medicine physician. She specializes in the care of youth living with HIV infection and medical care to transgender and gender-diverse youth. Dowshen researches health inequality, access to care, and promoting resilience in LGBT youth. As an associate professor at the Perelman School of Medicine at the University of Pennsylvania, she is also the medical director and co-founder of the Gender and Sexuality Development Clinic.

== Early life and education ==
Dowshen earned her Bachelor of Arts degree, master of science in health policy research (MSHP) and medical degree at the Perelman School of Medicine at the University of Pennsylvania (Penn Med). She then completed a pediatric residency at the Children's Hospital of Philadelphia (CHOP). Dowshen conducted fellowships in general academic pediatrics at the Lurie Children's Hospital and adolescent medicine at CHOP.

== Career and research ==
Upon completing her medical degree, Dowshen joined the CHOPs' PolicyLab and received the 2010 Society for Adolescent Health and Medicine New Investigator Award for her research identifying protective factors against HIV infection among transgender youth. As a researcher in the PolicyLab, Dowshen was the senior author of a study which detailed the specific barriers HIV-positive young patients faced compared to peers with other chronic diseases. In 2014, Dowshen co-launched the Gender & Sexuality Development Clinic at the Children's Hospital of Philadelphia with Linda Hawkins. They were supported by a CHOP Cares Community Grant to fund monthly support groups for transgender children and teens. She was also named an inaugural Community Scholar-in-Residence recipient by the Community Engagement and Research (CEAR) Core of the UPenn CTSA.

During her tenure at CHOP and an assistant professor at Penn Med, Dowshen served on the board of directors of the Sexual Information and Education Council of the United States and also served on the executive board of the Alice Paul Center for Research on Gender, Sexuality and Women and the Penn Program on Gender, Sexuality and Women's Studies at Penn. In 2020, Dowshen was promoted from assistant professor of pediatrics at Penn Med to associate professor. She was also elected a Stoneleigh Fellow from 2020 to 2022.

== Personal life ==
Dowshen, a lifelong Philadelphian, has two children and is married to Alfred Atanda Jr., a pediatric orthopedic surgeon.

== Selected works ==
- Dowshen, Nadia; Binns, Helen J.; Garofalo, Robert (2009). "Experiences of HIV-Related Stigma Among Young Men Who Have Sex with Men". AIDS Patient Care and STDs. 23 (5): 371–376. doi:10.1089/apc.2008.0256. ISSN 1087-2914. PMC 2856436. PMID 19320600.
- Dowshen, Nadia; D'Angelo, Lawrence (2011). "Health Care Transition for Youth Living With HIV/AIDS". Pediatrics. 128 (4): 762–771. doi:10.1542/peds.2011-0068. ISSN 0031-4005. PMID 21930548. S2CID 28818924.
- Dowshen, Nadia; Kuhns, Lisa M; Johnson, Amy; Holoyda, Brian James; Garofalo, Robert (2012). "Improving Adherence to Antiretroviral Therapy for Youth Living with HIV/AIDS: A Pilot Study Using Personalized, Interactive, Daily Text Message Reminders". Journal of Medical Internet Research. 14 (2): e51. doi:10.2196/jmir.2015. ISSN 1438-8871. PMC 3376506. PMID 22481246.
