= Lurie Children's Hospital =

Hospital in Chicago, Illinois, US

Ann & Robert H. Lurie Children's Hospital of Chicago

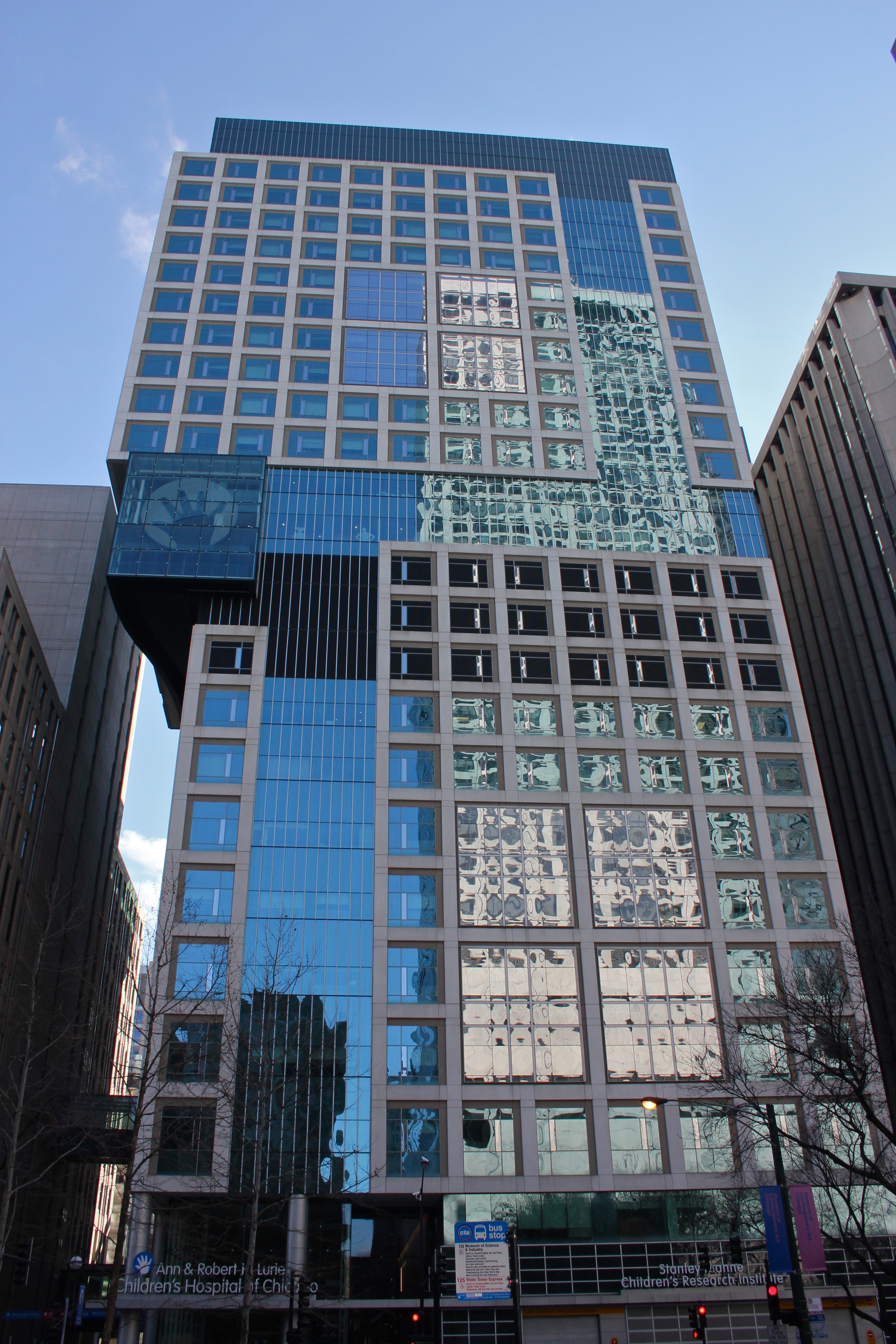

Geography
- Location: 225 East Chicago Avenue, Chicago, Illinois, United States
- Coordinates: 41°53′47″N 87°37′19″W

Organization
- Type: Teaching
- Affiliated university: Northwestern University Feinberg School of Medicine

Services
- Emergency department: Level 1 Pediatric Trauma Center
- Beds: 312
- Speciality: Children / Pediatrics

Helipads
- Helipad: FAA LID: 75IS
Number	Length		Surface
Number	ft	m	Surface
H1	66 x 66	20 x 20	rooftop

History
- Former name: Children's Memorial Hospital
- Constructed: Original: 1882; Current: 2012
- Founded: 1882

Links
- Website: www.luriechildrens.org
- Lists: Hospitals in Illinois

Ann & Robert H. Lurie Children's Hospital of Chicago, formerly Children's Memorial Hospital and commonly known as Lurie Children's, is a nationally ranked pediatric acute care children's hospital located in Chicago, Illinois. The hospital has 360 beds and is affiliated with the Northwestern University Feinberg School of Medicine. The hospital provides comprehensive pediatric specialties and subspecialties to infants, children, teens, and young adults aged 0–21 throughout Illinois and surrounding regions. Lurie Children's also sometimes treats adults that require pediatric care. Ann & Robert H. Lurie Children's Hospital of Chicago also features a state designated Level 1 Pediatric Trauma Center, one of four in the state. The hospital has affiliations with the nearby Northwestern Memorial Hospital and the attached Prentice Women's Hospital. Lurie is located on the university's Streeterville campus with more than 1,665 physicians on its medical staff and 4,000 employees. Additionally, Lurie Children's has a rooftop helipad to transport critically ill pediatric patients to the hospital.

Lurie Children's hosts 70 pediatric subspecialties and has locations across the Chicago area. Physicians and staff provided care for more than 212,000 children in 2018, from 48 states and 49 countries.

On the 2019–2020 U.S. News & World Report rankings of the Best Children's Hospitals, Lurie Children's is the top children's hospital in Illinois, ranking in all 10 specialties.

== History ==
=== Origins ===
Founded in 1882 as the Maurice Porter Memorial Hospital, an 8-bed cottage exclusively for children aged 3–13 at the corner of Chicago's Halsted and Belden streets was established by nurse and mother Julia Foster Porter after the death of her 13-year-old son. The site today is home to the DePaul University College of Education building and has a historic plaque at its entrance.

Two years later in 1884, Porter acquired another property a few blocks away from the original building and built a three-story replacement hospital with 22 beds. In 1896 Porter planned and supported another expansion that increased the hospital's capacity to 50 beds.

In 1903, Porter was given a large gift that allowed for the purchase the triangular block of land on which the new Maurice Porter Children's Hospital was built. It remained in Chicago's Lincoln Park neighborhood for 130 years.

The hospital underwent further reorganization in 1904, ultimately changing the hospital's name from the Maurice Porter Children's Hospital to Children's Memorial Hospital (CMH). A few years later, in 1907 the hospital was gifted an X-ray machine by local philanthropist, John Borland.

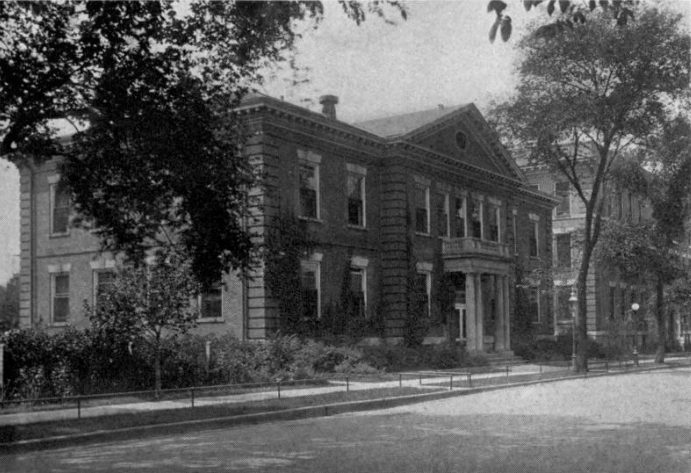
Children's Memorial Hospital, 735 Fullerton Avenue in 1922

By 1908, capacity reached 108 beds after the opening of the "Cribside Pavilion", also allowing admission of infants for the first time in the hospital's history. In 1912, CMH was again expanded allowing the hospital to have a total capacity of 175 beds. Generous philanthropic support from the community, including endowments of between $350 and $500 to support a patient bed for 1 year, allowed the hospital to continue providing free care.

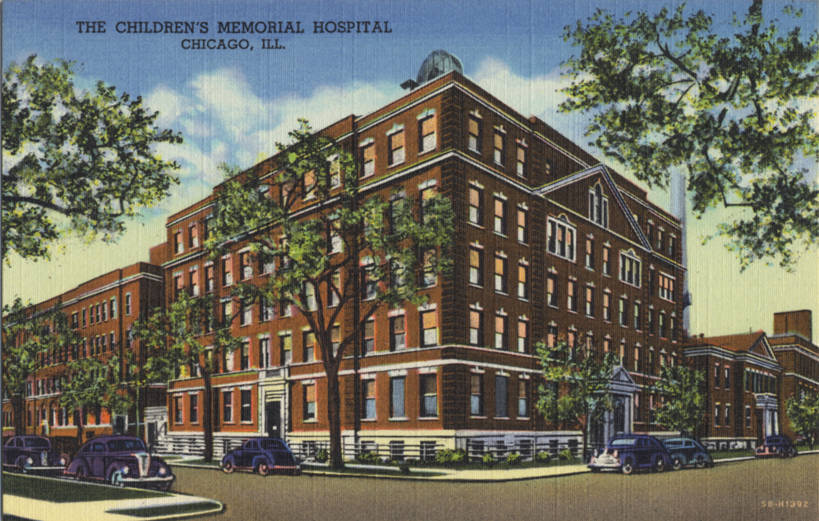
The Martha Wilson Memorial Pavilion in 1945

In 1926, CMH constructed the new "Martha Wilson Memorial Pavilion", increasing total hospital capacity to 272 beds. During construction of the new pavilion, they also built a residence for nurses and interns on the site of the former 1886 hospital.

In the 1940s, doctors from CMH pioneered one of the earliest pediatric surgery programs in the country. Surgeons Willis J. Potts and Sidney Smith invented a number of surgical tools used to operate on blood vessels and they devised a new surgery to treat blue baby syndrome.

In 1957, it was decided by CMH administration that a new modern hospital building was needed to replace the Maurice Porter and Agnes Wilson pavilions. Three years later, in 1960 demolition was started and ground was broken to make way for the new patient tower, research building, and administrative offices. Two years later, on October 11, 1962, the new patient tower officially opened, with the research tower opening in 1963. In the 1960s Children's Memorial Hospital's department of anesthesia first established a pediatric intensive care unit (PICU) at CMH with the capacity of 10 beds.

In June 1979, former McDonald's CEO, Ray Kroc made a donation to the hospital that funded the addition of a three-story building named the "Ray A. Kroc Diagnostic and Treatment Center" in his honor. The building included new operating rooms, a new 25-bed emergency department and a radiology suite.

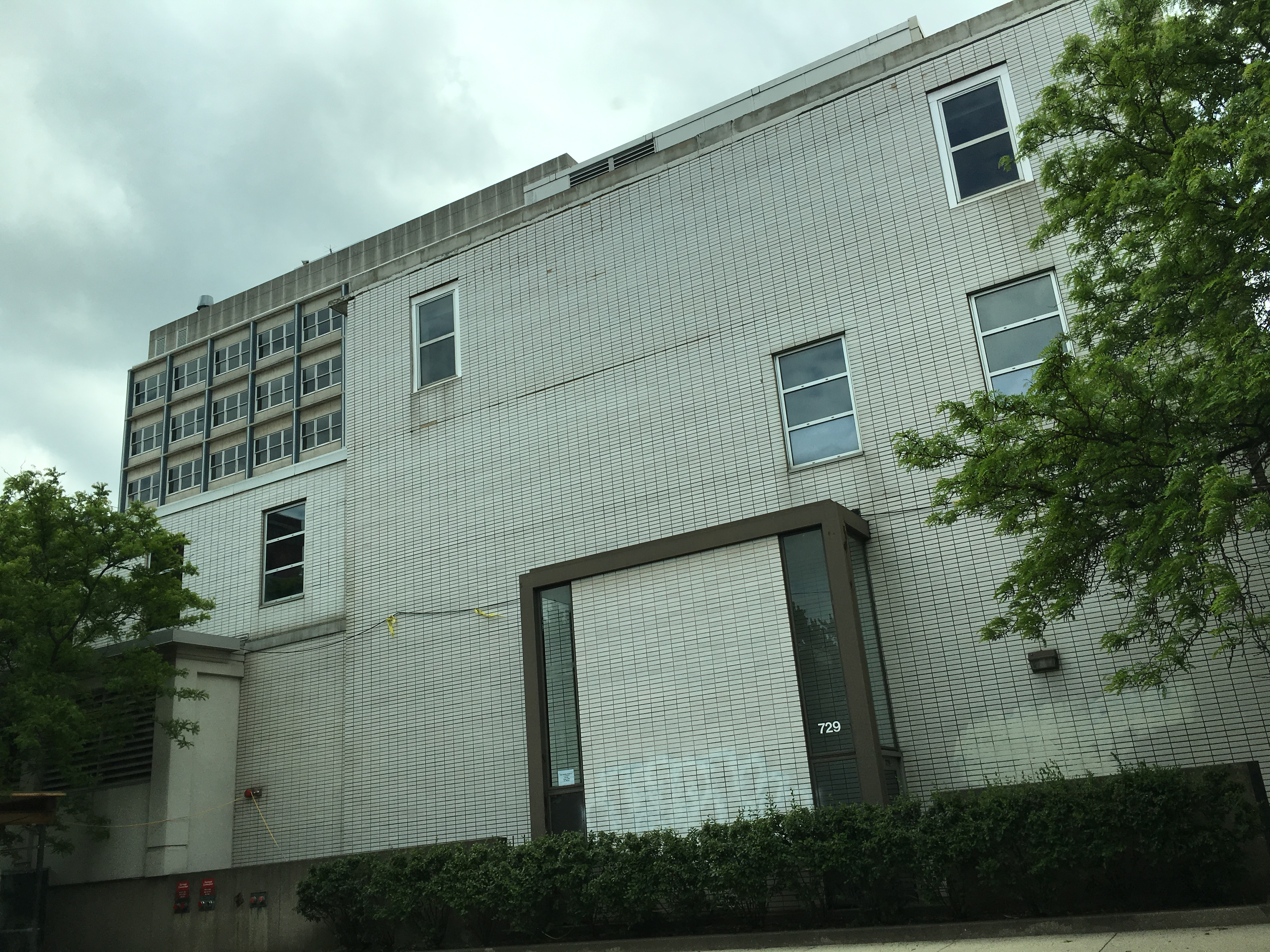
The main tower of what was then known as Children's Memorial Hospital in 2016

In 1982 CMH added on a four floor expansion to the main hospital bed tower. The four floors were topped with a new rooftop helipad and one of the floors served as the neonatal intensive care unit for the hospital. Also in 1982, CMH successfully separated a pair of conjoined twins during a nine-hour operation. The twins were previously joined at their pelvises.

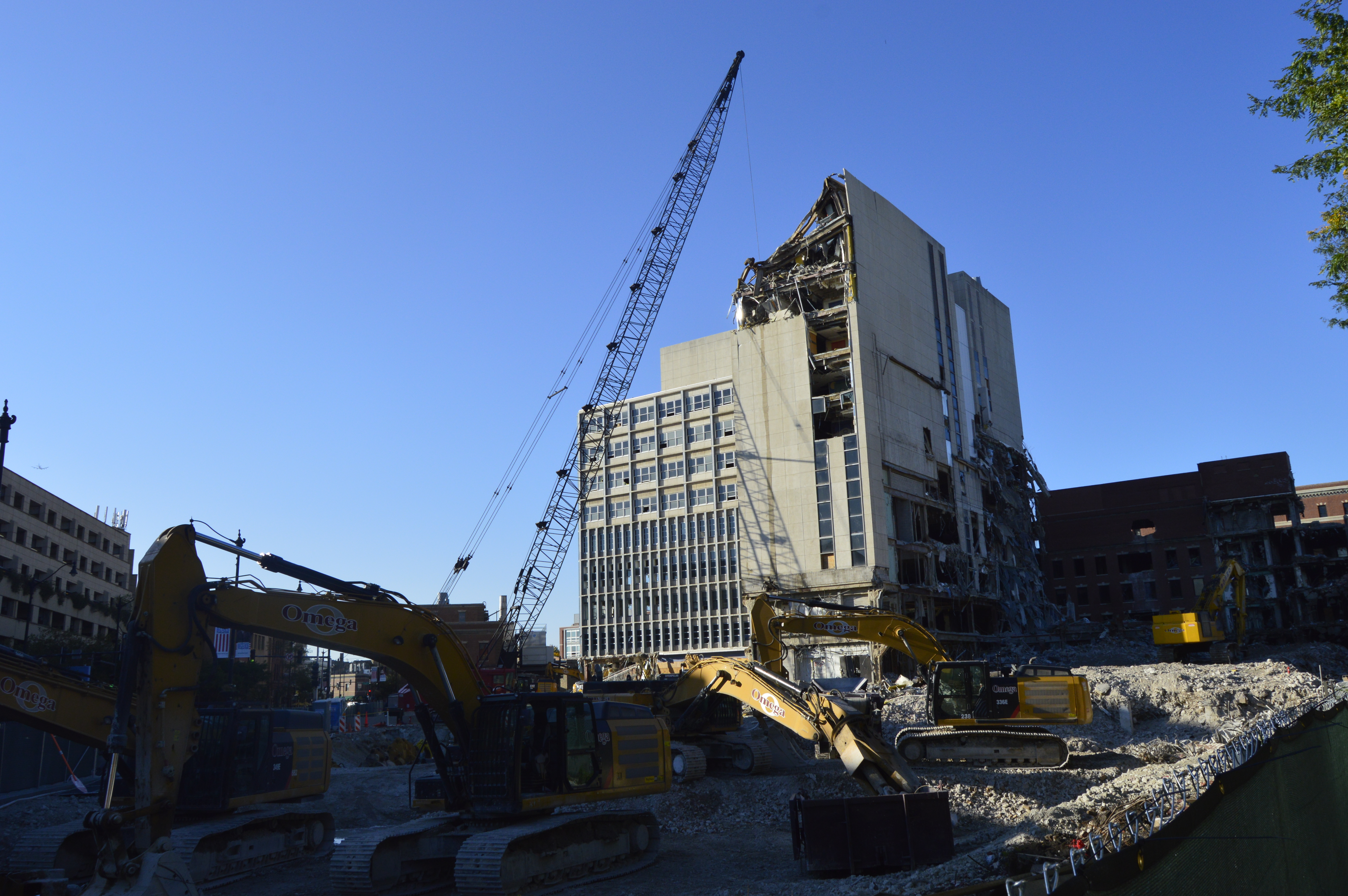
The former site being demolished

In 2006, hospital administration had announced plans to build an entirely new children's hospital closer to downtown Chicago and closer to the campus of their academic affiliate, Northwestern University. In 2008, the hospital administration and CEO were victims of extortion by then-governor Rod Blagojevich for $8 million of state funding in exchange for a $25,000 fundraiser.

After the move, the old buildings on the former site sat empty for years becoming an "eyesore" that angered the local community. In 2016, demolition on the former Children's Memorial Hospital began to make way for low-rise apartment and retail space.

=== New Hospital Campus ===
On June 9, 2012, the hospital moved from their old campus to its current location in Streeterville, in a coordinated move of 200 children that took over 10 hours. The hospital also changed its name to Ann & Robert H. Lurie Children's Hospital of Chicago. The new name recognized philanthropist Ann Lurie, and her late husband, in honor of the $100 million gift she made in 2007 to help create the new hospital and to enhance its pediatric research initiatives. More than just a donation, Ann Lurie secured funding from other philanthropists and gave tours of the hospital. She also served on the board of the hospital. The donation was the largest that the hospital had ever received.

The staff moved 170 patients and their parents, traveling by ambulance and escorted by the Chicago Police Department. The move was designed to allow the hospital to be closer to its academic partner Northwestern University Feinberg School of Medicine, attract and retain the best staff, foster stronger, collaboration with adult researchers and clinicians, improve transition of patients into adult care, and provide even faster transport for critically ill newborns from neighboring Prentice Women's Hospital.

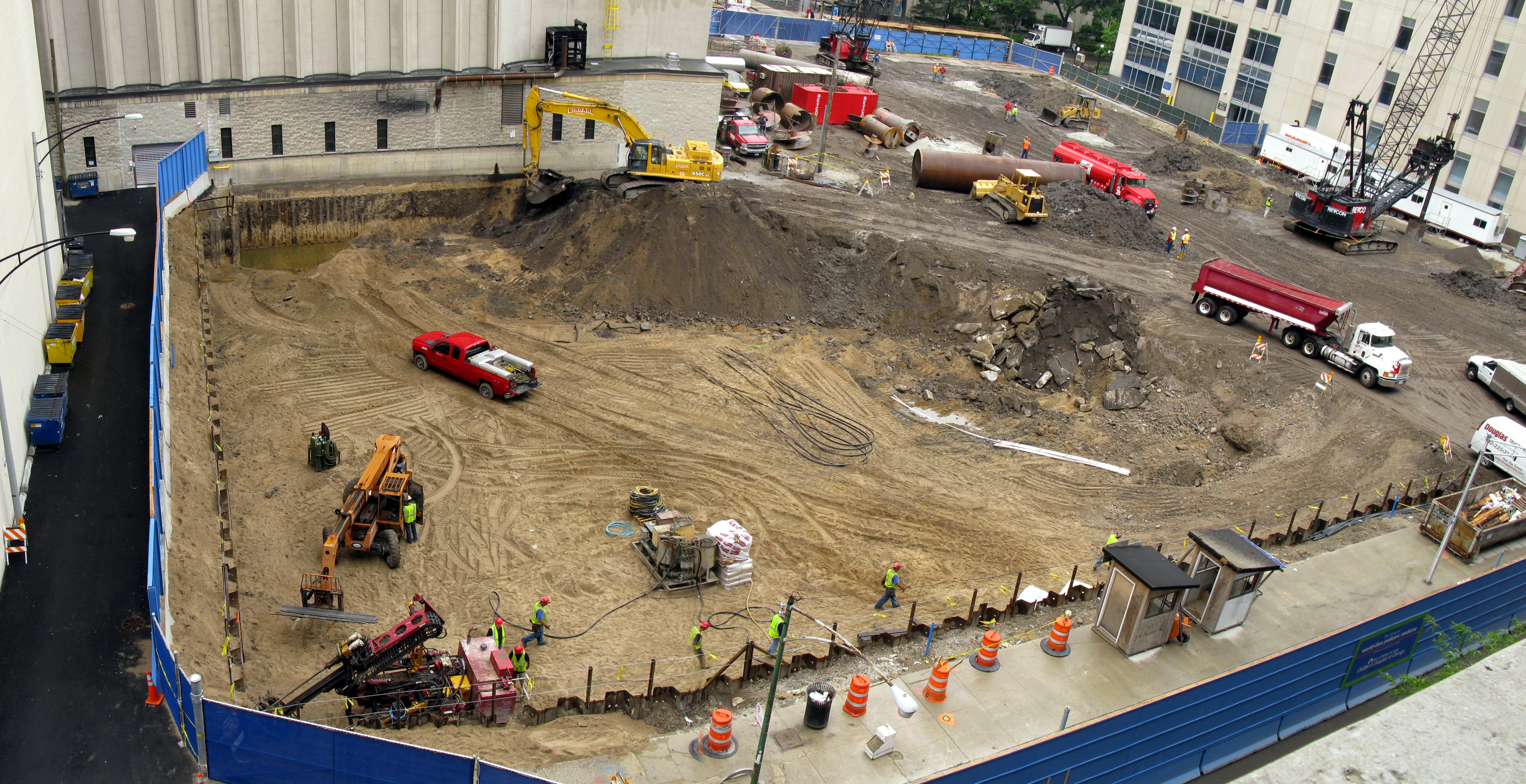
Clearing of the land to make way for the Ann and Robert H. Lurie Children's Hospital, replacing the old Children's Memorial Hospital

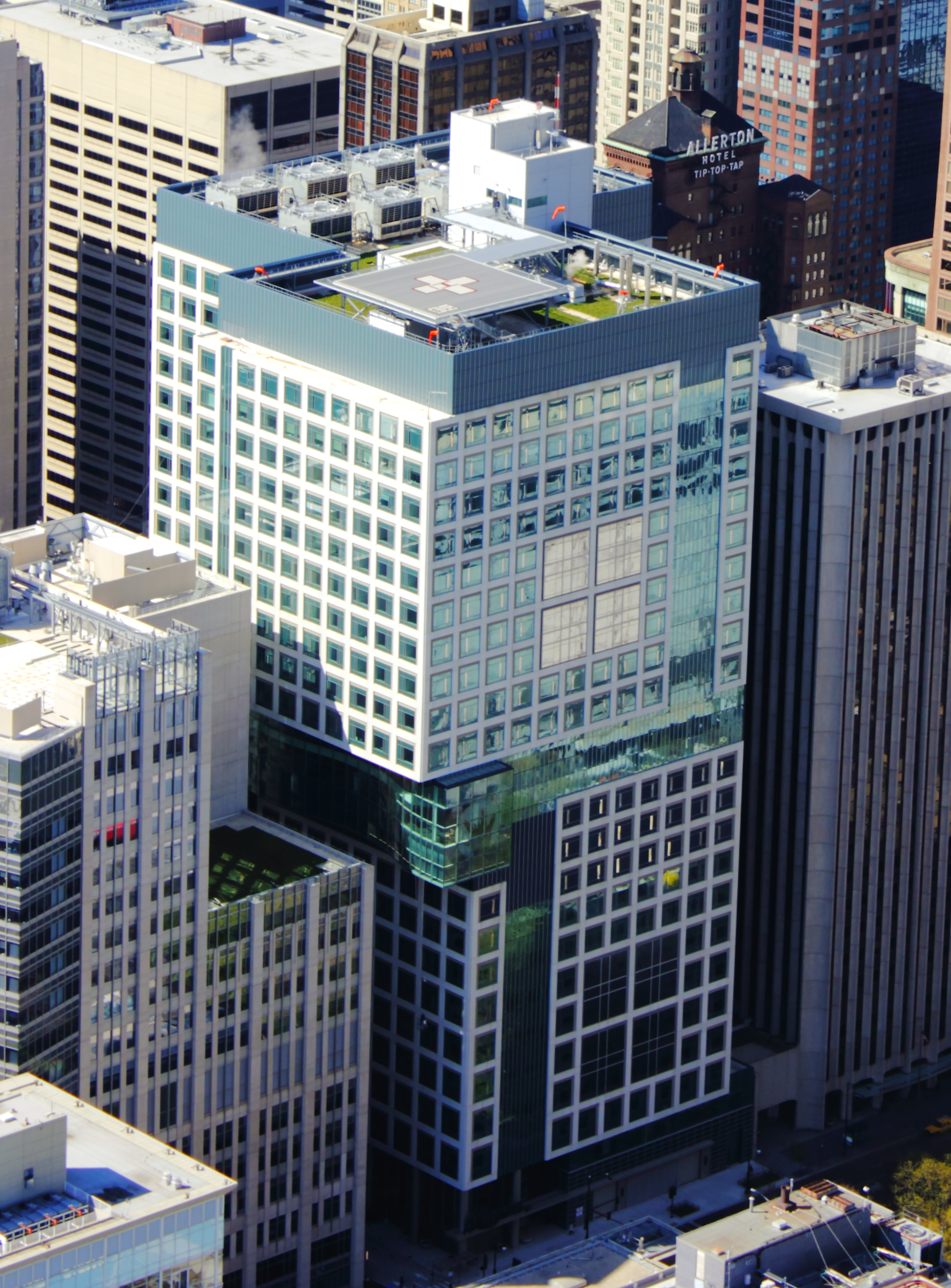
The rooftop helipad of Lurie Children's Hospital

The new 1.25-million-square-foot (116-thousand-square-metre) building cost $605 million (excluding land) and was completed in June 2012. The building featured 23 floors and was envisioned by ZGF Architects, Solomon Cordwell Buenz, and Anderson Mikos Architects. Structural engineering services for the new building was provided by Magnusson Klemencic Associates. Construction of the building was managed by a joint venture of Mortenson Construction and Power Construction.

The new hospital was set to have a rooftop helipad for the critical transport of pediatric patients, which angered local residents and pilots citing safety and noise concerns of a rooftop helipad. A local resident organization eventually filed a lawsuit to try and stop the helipad, ultimately losing the case.

The unique design of the hospital included many firsts in hospital design that included the emergency room being on the second floor. The hospital included almost double the space of the previous hospital and include much needed amenities including outdoor spaces for patients and families, playrooms, and private patient rooms. Design of the hospital has been industry praised and featured in many prominent publications. The new hospital also includes multiple terraces with plants and trees to help calm patients and families with a new helipad on top for transport of critically ill pediatric patients.

In October 2014, the hospital inaugurated its first annual Hope and Courage awards, recognizing "leaders who have demonstrated exceptional commitments to improving the health and well-being of children". The 2014 honorees were Jamarielle Ransom-Marks, who runs the Jam's Blood and Bone Marrow Drive, child product safety advocates Linda E. Ginzel and Boaz Keysar, and Senator Richard J. Durbin.

In 2016, Lurie Children's announced their plans for a $51 million expansion that would add 44 pediatric intensive care beds and four neonatal intensive care beds to existing space within the hospital. The hospital cited the need for more intensive care beds due to the fact that they were often at capacity, and previously had to turn away patients.

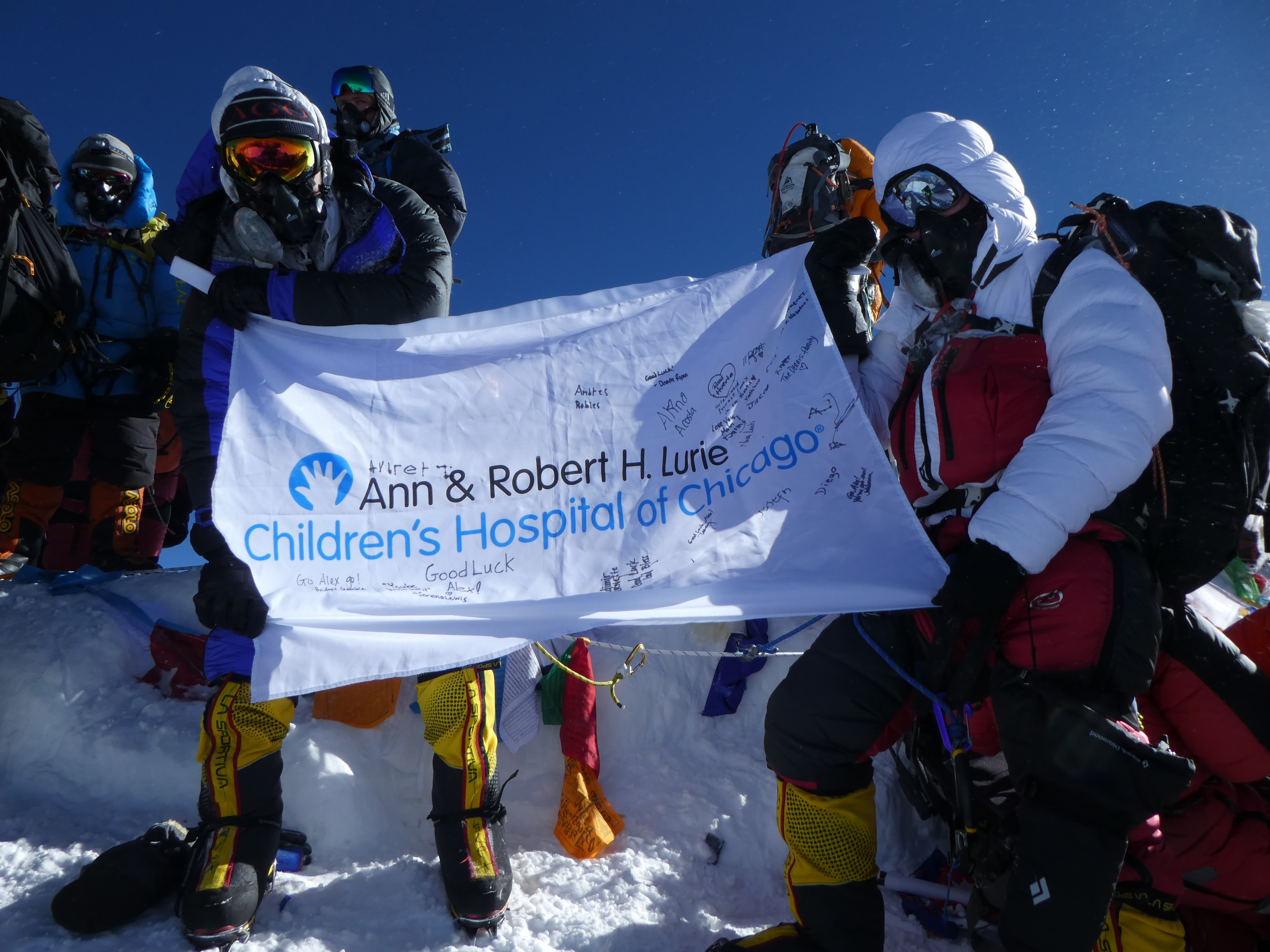
Pancoe (right) raising the Lurie Children's flag on the summit of Mt Everest in May 2019

In 2019, Chicago native Alex Pancoe started a fundraiser where he committed to climb Mount Everest to raise funds for the hospital with a goal to raise $1 million. Pancoe was previously treated at Lurie Children's Hospital for a brain tumor when he was in college.

In March 2020, Lurie Children's Hospital announced that they would transfer children from other area-hospitals to Lurie to make way for adult COVID-19 surge capacity at the adult hospitals and allow for the adult hospitals to convert their pediatric beds. The next month, in April 2020, Lurie Children's Hospital loaned out many of their ventilators to adult hospitals in the area (including neighboring Northwestern Memorial Hospital) to help deal with the adult ventilator shortage because of the 2020 COVID-19 pandemic.

In May 2020, it was announced that two employees had viewed over 8,000 HIPAA-protected patient records without permission throughout the previous year. The two employees were fired, but a class-action lawsuit was filed against the hospital for the breach of privacy. In December 2020, doctors from Lurie Children's pioneered the use of gene replacement therapy to treat a case of a baby with type 1 spinal muscular atrophy, a disease that deteriorates the muscles. In early 2021, management from both Lurie Children's and Rush University Medical Center (RUMC) announced that they would be forming a pediatric alliance to better deliver pediatric care throughout the region. The alliance would officially start on February 1, 2021, and would align both inpatient and outpatient pediatric services at RUMC under the "Lurie Children's umbrella", known as "Lurie Children's & Rush Advancing Children's Health".

== About ==
=== Education ===
As the primary pediatric teaching hospital of Northwestern University Feinberg School of Medicine, the hospital has a pediatrics residency and fellowship program, maintaining close affiliations with Northwestern. The Feinberg School is ranked 17th for research and 17th for primary care in the 2016–17 U.S. News & World Report rankings of top research-oriented medical schools in the country.

=== Research ===
A formal pediatric research program at the hospital dates back to 1982 when the Children's Memorial Research Center was established. Additional floors for research were dedicated in 2004.

When the hospital moved to their new campus in 2012 and changed names, the research institute was renamed to the Lurie Children's Research Institute. In 2014, the Lurie Children's Research Institute received a donation from philanthropist, Stanley Manne. The donation prompted hospital officials to rename the research arm to the Stanley Manne Children's Research Institute to honor Manne. In 2019, the institute was relocated from its original location in Lincoln Park to the current location in the Northwestern University owned, Simpson Querrey Biomedical Research Center.

=== Patient care units ===
The Ann & Robert H. Lurie Children's Hospital of Chicago has a variety of patient care units to care for pediatric patients aged 0–21 throughout Chicago.

- 48-bed general medical & medical observation units
- 40-bed pediatric intensive care unit (PICU)
- 48-bed pediatric hematology and oncology unit
- 44-bed cardiac care unit
- 64-bed neonatal intensive care unit (NICU)
- 45-bed emergency department
- 23-bed pre and post operative
- 12-bed psychiatric unit (ages 3–17)

In addition to the pediatric patient care units, Lurie Children's Hospital has 21 operating rooms and a sky garden to help relax families at the hospital.

=== Ronald McDonald House ===
Opened in 2012, about five blocks away from Lurie Children's Hospital is the Ronald McDonald House Near Lurie Children's Hospital (RMCH), one of many in the Chicago region. The house has 70 all-private guest rooms to serve families of pediatric patients aged 21 years or younger in treatment at Lurie Children's, neonates at Prentice Women's, and pediatric rehabilitation patients from Shirley Ryan AbilityLab. The house provides places to sleep, meals, and entertainment to siblings and families for free. Additionally, Lurie Children's hosts a Ronald McDonald family room on site that offers nine sleep rooms, showers, and other amenities to families with children being treated at the hospital.

==== History ====
Before Lurie Children's Hospital moved to their current location, Children's Memorial Hospital featured a 21-room RMCH near their campus. When Lurie Children's moved to the Streeterville neighborhood, a new $40 million, 14-story RMCH was built five blocks away, and nine rooms were built into the Lurie Children's building. The former house near the defunct hospital was later demolished. In August 2018, pharmaceutical company, AbbVie donated $100 million to the nationwide Ronald McDonald House charities, and set aside $3 million for the Chicago Ronald McDonald houses, with AbbVie officials later touring the house. In November 2019 the house unveiled a four-room expansion to increase their capacity and serve more families. In August 2020 the house underwent minor damage after a group of looters taking advantage of a local police shooting protest shattered the glass front door of the house. Additionally, families inside the house were placed on lockdown to ensure their safety.

== Awards and rankings ==
- As the first free-standing children's hospital in the country and the first hospital in Illinois, the hospital was granted in 2001 the first of its four Magnet designations which it received again in 2005, 2010 and 2015. Less than one percent of all hospitals have achieved this accomplishment of redesignation three or more times.
- Upon the opening of the new Lurie Children's Hospital in 2012, the building was designated as LEED Gold certified for environmentally-friendly features like their green roof and stormwater management system.
- In 2012 the hospital received a design award from the magazine Modern Healthcare for the advanced design and construction practices used to build the new Lurie Children's Hospital.
- The hospital is one of only 10 children's hospitals nationwide, and the only one in Illinois, to be named a "Top Hospital" for patient safety by The Leapfrog Group, a national consortium of healthcare payers that promotes "leaps" in patient safety.
- The Joint Commission, the leading accreditor of healthcare organizations in America, named the hospital as one of three of the nation's top performers on key quality measures. Children's hospitals were ranked in one area – children's asthma.
- In 2014 the hospital was recognized on the Becker's Hospital Review list of "150 Great Places to Work in Healthcare".
- In July 2016, the hospital became the first children's hospital in Illinois to be designated as a level 1 pediatric surgery center by the American College of Surgeons. The hospital is 1 of 24 nationwide that have received this designation.
- In both 2019 and 2020, Lurie Children's Hospital was named as a best midsize employer (2019), and a best employer in Illinois (2020) by Forbes magazine. Also in 2020, Lurie Children's was designated as a "level 8 acute" hospital by the CHIME "most wired" hospital survey for their advanced use of technology.

=== U.S. News rankings ===
On the 2007–08 rankings, Children's Memorial Hospital was ranked #25 best children's hospital in the U.S. on the U.S. News & World Report rankings of pediatric hospitals in the United States.

On the 2010–11 rankings, Children's Memorial Hospital was ranked #10 in pediatric cancer, #10 in pediatric gastroenterology, #18 in pediatric cardiology, #10 in pediatric nephrology, #15 in neonatology, #10 in pediatric neurosurgery, #18 in pediatric orthopedics, #19 in pediatric pulmonology, and #5 in pediatric urology on the U.S. News & World Report rankings of pediatric hospitals in the United States.

Ranked #6 among only 11 children's hospitals nationwide to qualify for the Honor Roll in the 2016–17 U.S. News & World Report Best Children's Hospitals rankings.

The hospital was ranked as the #10 best children's hospital in the country on the 2018–19 U.S. News & World Report list of honor roll children's hospitals.

As of 2024 Lurie Children's has placed nationally in all 11 ranked pediatric specialties on U.S. News & World Report.

2024 U.S. News & World Report Rankings for Lurie Children's
Specialty	Rank (In the U.S.)	Score (Out of 100)
Neonatology	#10	80.2
Pediatric & Adolescent Behavioral Health	Top 50	n/a
Pediatric Cancer	#19	81.7
Pediatric Cardiology & Heart Surgery	#24	68.5
Pediatric Diabetes & Endocrinology	#11	80.9
Pediatric Gastroenterology & GI Surgery	#16	80.4
Pediatric Nephrology	#11	89.4
Pediatric Neurology & Neurosurgery	#7	88.8
Pediatric Orthopedics	#38	71.1
Pediatric Pulmonology & Lung Surgery	#23	71.3
Pediatric Urology	#15	76.1

== Notable people ==
- Robert Satcher – Former physician, and NASA Astronaut
- Susan L. Cohn – Physician and pediatric oncology chief at Comer Children's Hospital, completed pediatric fellowship at Children's Memorial Hospital.
- John F Sarwark – Physician and head of pediatric orthopedics at Lurie Children's.
- Willis J. Potts – Pioneered one of the country's first pediatric surgery programs at Children's Memorial Hospital.
- Orvar Swenson – Former surgeon-in-chief at Children's Memorial Hospital.
- Frank Spooner Churchill – President of the medical staff at Children's Memorial Hospital from 1909 to 1917.
- Stephen Dolgin – American pediatric surgeon who completed fellowship at Children's Memorial Hospital.
- Wolf W. Zuelzer – Pediatric pathologist who completed residency at Children's Memorial Hospital.
- Richard Zhao – Chinese-American pathologist who conducted research at the Children's Memorial Hospital.
- Rebekah D. Fenton – American physician who works in the department of Adolescent and Young Adult Medicine at Lurie Children's Hospital.
- Marc Weissbluth – American pediatrician and author trained at Children's Memorial Hospital.
- George J. Mohr – Completed pediatric internship at Children's Memorial Hospital.
- Nadia Dowshen – American pediatrician who completed fellowship at Lurie Children's Hospital.
- Ellen Sidransky – American pediatrician who completed residency at Lurie Children's Hospital.

== See also ==
- List of children's hospitals in the United States
- Children's Hospital of Philadelphia
- Northwestern Memorial Hospital
- Advocate Children's Hospital
