= Rebekah D. Fenton =

American pediatrician and health advocate

- Born: c. 1990 (age 35–36); Sacramento, California, U.S
- Education: Stanford University; Perelman School of Medicine; University of Washington
- Known for: Adolescent health advocacy
- Awards: James Owens Sr., MD Award for Excellence in Adolescent Health and Medicine
- Scientific career
- Fields: Adolescent health and pediatrics
- Workplaces: Feinberg School of Medicine

Rebekah D. Fenton (born 1990) is an American pediatrician and adolescent health advocate. Fenton is an Adolescent Medicine Fellow in The Potocsnak Family Division of Adolescent and Young Adult Medicine at Lurie Children's Hospital at the Feinberg School of Medicine at Northwestern University in Chicago, Illinois.

Fenton's clinical work is centered around providing healthcare for marginalized youth populations with a focus on cultural humility and health equity.

After the police murder of George Floyd, Fenton provided medical care to protestors and has created virtual grieving spaces for Black and brown people in her medical community.

Fenton also writes about topics such as public health, adolescent medicine, and diversity in medicine.

== Early life and education ==
Fenton grew up in Sacramento, California. Fenton's parents both worked in healthcare. Fenton attended St. Francis High School, an all-women's high school, in Sacramento, California. In high school, Fenton's sister was diagnosed with Hodgkin Lymphoma; this experience inspired Fenton's future work with adolescents.

In 2008, Fenton pursued her undergraduate degree at Stanford University, where she majored in human biology. In 2010, Fenton worked with her friend Michael Tubbs to create a program at Stanford which heledp underrepresented high school students apply to college and become the first in their families to post secondary education. The non-profit they founded was called The Phoenix Scholars. Fenton was the Director of Mentor Development for the program for three years and also mentored three students directly. In addition to her non-profit, Fenton volunteered with the Stanford Hospital's Teen Health Van to provide healthcare services to uninsured teens.

After graduating from Stanford in 2012, Fenton attended medical school at the Perelman School of Medicine at the University of Pennsylvania. In medical school, Fenton discovered that she wanted to practice adolescent medicine where she could listen to patients’ stories and diagnose them in a holistic way that did not focus on just one organ system. During medical school, Fenton also found out about the return of her sister's cancer. Fenton became a bone marrow donor for her sister, which led to the successful treatment of her sister's cancer.

Following her medical degree in 2016, Fenton moved back to the West Coast to pursue her residency training in Pediatrics at the Seattle Children's Hospital at the University of Washington in Seattle, Washington.

== Career and advocacy ==
In 2019, Fenton became an Adolescent Medicine Fellow in the Potocsnak Family Division of Adolescent and Young Adult Medicine at the Ann and Robert H. Lurie Children's Hospital of Chicago at the Feinberg School of Medicine at Northwestern University in Chicago, Illinois. Fenton specializes in Adolescent Medicine with a focus on treating and educating marginalized youth populations such as homeless and gender-nonconforming youth. She has conducted research on the use of hospital sponsored blogs as a platform for transgender teens and their families to seek anonymous medical advice and expertise. Fenton also continues to advocate for supporting minorities in medicine. She organizes group mentoring sessions for medical students from racially underrepresented backgrounds to help them prepare their applications for pediatric residency programs. She uses her own story as an example of the lack of confidence and support given to minority students, and then she created a supportive mentorship community to make sure that every student has a chance to excel and continue their careers in medicine.

=== Writing and advocacy ===
After the murder of George Floyd in 2020, Fenton wrote about her experience providing care for Black Lives Matter protesters. Fenton also worked with her colleagues to create a grieving space for Black and brown healthcare workers and students. In addition to organizing and participating in marches alongside fellow physicians, Fenton advocates for the need for physicians and healthcare workers to acknowledge racism in their day-to-day work in order to provide the best care for their patients.

== Awards and honors ==
- 2019 James Owens Sr., MD Award for Excellence in Adolescent Health and Medicine
- 2016 Selected Student Speaker for her Medical School Graduating Class at Perelman School of Medicine

== Select media and writing ==
- 2020 Medium “Physicians for #PoliceFreeSchools”
- 2020 Bustle.com “Talking About Racism Must Be A Part Of Health Care, According To A Doctor”
- 2020 Forbes “‘I Am Tired’: What Black Doctors Need You To Know Right Now”
- 2020 Medpage Today “Can't We Do Better to Support Minorities in Medicine? — At every step, too many of us fall by the wayside”
- 2020 Medium “I'm Concerned About “US”: A Black Doctor's Plea for Racial COVID-19 Data”
- 2018 UW Medicine Newsroom “As med school swells vocabulary, plain English can wither”
- 2018 Kevin MD.com “Medical education systematically ignores the diversity of medical practice”
- 2016 The Philadelphia Inquirer “Despite doubts and hurdles, why medicine is a calling for Penn Med student”
- 2016 Penn Medicine News “Match Day 2016: A Tale of Two Coasts”
- 2015 The Grown Up Truth “Diary of A Young Pro: Rebekah Lucien”

== Publications ==
- Fenton, R. (2019). When Doctors Unlearn English. Journal of Palliative Care, 34(1), 16–17. https://doi.org/10.1177/0825859718795438
- Rebekah Fenton, Sara Handschin, Yolanda Evans. 81 - “What Options Do I Have?”: Qualitative Analysis of Comments by Transgender Youth and Their Families on Adolescent Health Blog. Journal of Adolescent Health. Volume 62, Issue 2, Supplement, 2018, Pages S44-S45, ISSN 1054-139X, https://doi.org/10.1016/j.jadohealth.2017.11.088.
