= Faerber =

Faerber or Färber (German for "dyer") is a German surname. Notable people with the surname include:

- Hans-Johann Färber (born 1947), German rower
- Hermann Färber (born 1963), German politician
- Jay Faerber (born 1972), American comic book writer
- Jörg Faerber (1929–2022), German conductor
- Winston Faerber (born 1971), Dutch-Surinamese football player

== See also ==
- Farber
- Ferber
