= Marc Weissbluth =

American pediatrician and author

Marc Weissbluth is an American pediatrician and author whose work focuses on sleep in infants and children. He is a professor emeritus of clinical pediatrics at the Feinberg School of Medicine of Northwestern University and founded a sleep disorders center at Children's Memorial Hospital in Chicago. He is the author of several books on children's sleep, including Healthy Sleep Habits, Happy Child, first published in 1987.

== Career and research ==
Weissbluth established a sleep disorders center at Children's Memorial Hospital, which later became the Ann & Robert H. Lurie Children's Hospital of Chicago. He has also held a faculty position in clinical pediatrics at Northwestern University, where he is professor emeritus.

His research has addressed infant sleep patterns, night waking, infant colic and daytime napping. In 1982, he published a case report in the journal Sleep describing a reduction in an infant's night waking following changes to the child's sleep schedule.

In a 1984 study published in The Journal of Pediatrics, Weissbluth and his colleagues examined parental reports of night waking among 141 infants aged four to eight months. The researchers identified an association between a history of infant colic and reported night-waking problems in a subgroup of the infants.

In 1995, he published a longitudinal study in Sleep examining napping patterns among 172 children followed from six months to seven years of age. The study described age-related changes in the frequency and duration of daytime naps. The findings were subsequently reported by the Los Angeles Times and other news outlets.

== Books and public recognition ==
Weissbluth's books address infant crying, sleep schedules and behavioral approaches to childhood sleep difficulties. His 1984 book Crybabies examined infant colic and its possible relationship to sleep. A review published in JAMA in 1985 discussed the book's presentation of Weissbluth's research and theories concerning colic.

His book Healthy Sleep Habits, Happy Child discusses children's sleep patterns and approaches to establishing regular sleep schedules. The book has been revised in several editions, including a fifth edition published in 2021.

Weissbluth's advice on children's sleep has been featured in the news media. In January 2022, CNN journalist Chloe Melas described consulting him about sleep difficulties affecting her two children. The resulting article discussed his recommendations concerning bedtimes, routines and nighttime awakenings.

In 2012, Chicago magazine included Weissbluth in its list of the 100 most powerful Chicagoans, ranking him 100th.

== Selected publications ==
- Crybabies: Coping with Colic, What to Do When Baby Won't Stop Crying (1984). Arbor House. ISBN 978-0877956112.
- Healthy Sleep Habits, Happy Child (1987). Ballantine Books. ISBN 978-0449902240.
- Sweet Baby: How to Soothe Your Newborn (1998). ISBN 978-0966614015.
- Your Fussy Baby: How to Soothe Your Newborn (2003). Ballantine Books. ISBN 978-0345463005.
- Healthy Sleep Habits, Happy Twins (2009). Ballantine Books. ISBN 978-0345497796.
