= Ferber method =

Disputed technique for resolving infant sleep problems

The Ferber method, or Ferberization, is a technique invented by Richard Ferber to solve infant sleep problems. It involves "sleep-training" children to self-soothe by allowing the child to cry for a predetermined amount of time at intervals before receiving external comfort.

== "Cry it out" ==
The "Cry It Out" (CIO) approach can be traced back to the book The Care and Feeding of Children written by Emmett Holt in 1894. CIO is any sleep-training method which allows a baby to cry for a specified period before the parent will offer comfort. "Ferberization" is one such approach. Ferber does not advocate simply leaving a baby to cry, but rather supports giving the baby time to learn to self-soothe, by offering comfort and support from the parent at predetermined intervals. The best age to attempt Ferber's sleep training method is around six months old.

Other CIO methods, such as Marc Weissbluth's extinction method, are often mistakenly referred to as "Ferberization", though they fall outside of the guidelines Ferber recommended. "Ferberization" is referred to as graduated extinction by Weissbluth. Some pediatricians argue that any form of CIO is unnecessary and damaging to a baby.

== Ferberization summarized ==
Ferber discusses and outlines a wide range of practices to teach an infant to sleep. The term Ferberization is now popularly used to refer to the following techniques:

- Take steps to prepare the baby to sleep. This includes night-time rituals and day-time activities.
- At bedtime, leave the child in bed and leave the room.
- Return at progressively increasing intervals to comfort the baby, but do not pick them up. For example, on the first night, some scenarios call for returning first after three minutes, then after five minutes, and thereafter each ten minutes, until the baby is asleep.
- Each subsequent night, return at intervals longer than the night before. For example, the second night may call for returning first after five minutes, then after ten minutes, and thereafter each twelve minutes, until the baby is asleep.

The technique is targeted at infants as young as four months of age. A few babies are capable of sleeping through the night at three months, and some are capable of sleeping through the night at six months. Before six months of age, the baby may still need to feed during the night and all babies will require a night feeding before three months.

== See also ==
- Swaddling
