= John F. Sarwark =

American pediatric orthopaedic surgeon

John Francis Sarwark is Martha Washington Foundation professor of pediatric orthopedics at Lurie Children's Hospital, former head of pediatric orthopedic surgery at Lurie Children's Hospital, and professor of orthopedic surgery at Northwestern University's Feinberg School of Medicine in Chicago, Illinois.

== Education ==
Sarwark earned his Medical Doctorate at Northwestern University Medical School and is alumnus member of Alpha Omega Alpha medical honor society. He completed his residency in orthopedic surgery at Northwestern University Medical School affiliated hospitals and completed training as a clinical fellow in pediatric orthopaedics at the Alfred I. duPont Hospital for Children, Wilmington, Delaware. Sarwark received his B.S. degree, honors program in biology 1975, from the University of Illinois. He is recognized leader in the evaluation, management, and research of scoliosis in children.

== Awards and accolades ==
Sarwark is active in numerous ongoing leadership activities and committees at Lurie Children's Hospital and NUFSM, including Research Strategic Planning LC, the Department of Orthopaedic Surgery, Feinberg School of Medicine and its Education and Residency Selection Committee, past Medical Faculty Senate Council member and National Alumni board member. He is past president of Nathan Smith Davis (Alumni) Club of NUFSM. Sarwark is past medical director for the Motion Analysis Center at Children's Memorial Hospital. In 2004, he received the Pathways Awareness Foundation's first Pioneer Award for his work in the early detection of mobility problems in infants. Sarwark received the prestigious Arnold Gold Foundation Humanism in Medicine Award from AAP Leadership at the 2014 AAPNCE. Sarwark received the 20th Annual Distinguished Service Award of the AAP Section on Orthopaedics.

== Association offices ==
He has served two terms as chairman of executive committee of the Section of Orthopaedics of the American Academy of Pediatrics (AAP) as well as the surgical advisory panel of the AAP. He served two terms on the AAP National Conference and Exhibition and Planning Group; he is a member of the Section on Sports Medicine and Fitness (SOSMF) of the AAP. Sarwark is an active member of the Pediatric Orthopaedic Society of North America (POSNA) on which he has twice served as a member of its board of directors and as ex officio member.

He has served as chair of POSNA's liaison committee with OKO of the American Academy of Orthopaedic Surgeons (AAOS). Sarwark has chaired and contributes to numerous specialty society meetings and courses. He has for many years served as a faculty member of the AAOS Basic Course for Orthopaedic Educators. He has chaired the American Academy of Orthopaedic Surgeons’ Committee on Patient Education and has served as a member of its Steering Committee on Collaboration Among Providers Involved with Musculoskeletal Care, among others.

Sarwark is active in the Scoliosis Research Society and has served on its education committee, chaired the Fellowship Committee, co-chaired the Committee on Non-operative Management and is a past member of the SRS Worldwide Course C. He is a member of the American Orthopaedic Association, 20th Century Orthopaedic Association, American Academy for Cerebral Palsy and Developmental Medicine, Society for Research into Hydrocephalus and Spina Bifida, and the American Society of Biomechanics, among others.

== Books ==
- Sarwark, John F., ed. (2010). Essentials of Musculoskeletal Medicine Edition 4. Chicago: American Academy of Orthopaedic Surgeons. ISBN 978-0892035793.
- Sarwark, John; LaBella, Cynthia, eds. (2010). Pediatric Othopedics and Sports Injuries 2nd Edition. Elk Grove Village, Illinois: American Academy of Pediatrics. ISBN 978-1-58110-284-0.
- Sarwark, John F.; Lubicky, John P., eds. (2001). Caring for the child with spina bifida. Chicago: American Academy of Orthopaedic Surgeons. ISBN 978-0-89203-237-2.
- Price, Susan; Pfeffer, Glenn B.; Jimenez, Ramon L.; Jimenez, Ramon; Sarwark, John F., eds. (2003). The 2003 Body Almanac: Your Personal Guide to Bone and Joint Health at Any Age. American Academy of Orthopaedic Surgeons. ISBN 978-0-89203-281-5.
- Sarwark, John F.; Shore, Richard M. (2004). "Pediatric Orthopaedics". In Johnson, Thomas R.; Steinbach, Lynne S. (eds.). Essentials of Musculoskeletal Imaging. American Academy of Orthopaedic Surgeons. pp. 749–894. ISBN 978-0-89203-324-9.

• John F. Sarwark MD FAAP FAAOS and 1 more

=== Pediatric Orthopaedics and Sports Injuries: A Quick Reference Guide ===
Third Edition

ISBN 978-1610025041, ISBN 1610025040
