= Robert Farber (artist) =

American artist (died 1995)

Robert Farber (1948 – 23 December 1995) was an American actor and artist.

== Early life ==
Farber was born and grew up in Hartsdale, New York. He studied theater at Brandeis University where he graduated in 1970. He then completed his studies at the London School of Dramatic Art and appeared in various Off-Broadway shows. In the 1980s, Farber studied at the Art Students League of New York and began to exhibit his work.

== Art career ==
Farber is best known for his artworks addressing the HIV/AID crisis. After he tested positive for HIV in 1989, Farber began to focus in earnest on the subject. One of his best known works, Every Ten Minutes is an audio recording of the bell in The Riverside Church, New York City tolling every ten minutes, representing the rate of deaths as a result of HIV/Aids.

His 1992 solo exhibition at Artist's Space, I Thought I Had Time, was composed of interviews with AIDS survivors and drew comparisons with the 14th century bubonic plague. A retrospective of his work Robert Farber: A Retrospective was presented in 1997 at the Rose Art Museum and at USC, Fisher Gallery in 1998.

Farber's work was included in the exhibition Art Aids America at the Zuckerman Museum of Art in 2016.

== Collections ==
Farber's audio work Every Ten Minutes is included in the permanent collection of the Museum of Modern Art, New York. His work also appears in the collection and the Victoria and Albert Museum, London.

== Death ==
Farber died of an AIDS-related illness on 23 December 1995 in Manhattan.
