= Christine Ferber =

French pastry chef and chocolatier

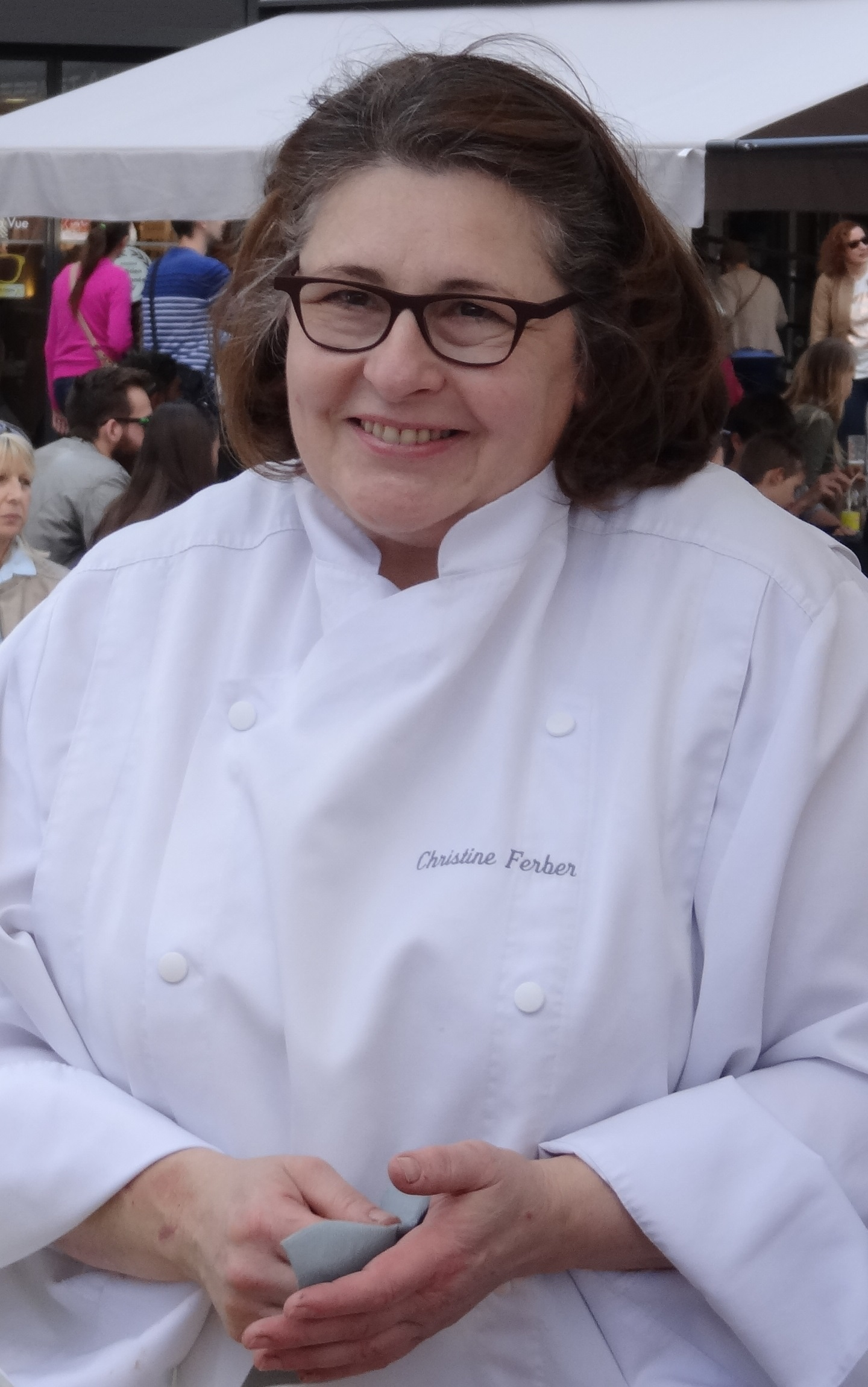
- Christine Ferber in 2017
- Born: 11 May 1960 (age 66); Colmar, Alsace, France
- Occupations: Pastry chef and chocolatier
- Years active: 1978 onward
- Known for: Internationally acclaimed jams and chocolate

Christine Ferber (born 11 May 1960) is a French pastry chef and chocolatier, who co-owns La Maison Ferber in Niedermorschwihr, Alsace region of France. She sells over 200,000 jars of jam a year across the world.

== Personal life ==
Ferber was born in Colmar, France, a medieval town five miles (8 km) apart from her village Niedermorschwihr. Her great-grandfather moved to Alsace from Germany in 1870. Her great-grandfather, grandfather and father all worked as pastry chefs. Her father Maurice opened La Maison Ferber in 1959, in a seventeenth century traditional French building called Au relais de Trois Épis (At the post house of the Three Ears). Ferber speaks French, Alsatian, German and English. Ferber's mother died in March 2020.

== Career ==
Aged 15, Ferber moved to Brussels in order to complete a three-year apprenticeship as a confectioner and chocolatière. Afterwards she spent a year in Paris to study with the renowned French pastry chef Lucien Peltier. Peltier was considered one of the most creative pastry chefs of his generation in the 1980s, his work inspired by the nouvelle cuisine was a reference for all professionals.

In 1979, she won the French Cup for patissiers. She moved back to Alsace in 1980, where she started her own workshop. She initially made jams, selling them in her parents' shop despite the resistance of her mother. In 1998, Ferber was voted Patissier of the Year by the Guide Champérard. In 2005, she produced a cookbook Alice's Little Kitchen in Wonderland, in reference to Lewis Carroll's book Alice's Adventures in Wonderland. The images for the book were intended to imitate Salvador Dalí style paintings. Ferber took joint ownership of La Maison Ferber with her brother Bruno and sister Betty, after the death of their father in 2011. In 2015/16, she had a larger workshop and storehouse built. In 2018, the building was awarded the Prix AMO architecture prize in the category "lieu le mieux productif" (most productive place).

Ferber makes over 200 varieties of jam, with traditional, regional, and original varieties. Examples of Ferber's unique flavours include celery and pineapple with rosemary. She also makes pies, stollens, beraweka, gingerbreads, and kougelhopfs. Around 35% of her revenue is from jams, and about 35% is from pastries. Ferber is nicknamed the Jam Fairy. She is also nicknamed Reine Christine by local Alsatians and honoured as the Queen of Jam around the world. Ferber sells 200,000 jars of jam per year, and all over the world, in countries including Spain, Germany, Japan, and Singapore. In Tokyo, her jam jars are sold in Isetan department stores, and are wrapped in red cloth and with a white bow. Fellow French pastry chef and chocolatier Pierre Hermé has said that Ferber "sells the best jams in the world", and he sells Ferber's jams in his shop in Paris. Her jam is also bought by chef Alain Ducasse, the three Michelin star La Maison Troisgros restaurant, as well as Hôtel de Crillon and Four Seasons Hotel George V, and The Connaught in London.

Ferber has also taught in France, Italy, Japan and the US. She has taught at the French Pastry School in Chicago, US. In 2013, British newspaper the Daily Mirror reported that Brad Pitt had become obsessed with Ferber's jams, and had flown to Alsace to meet her. However, Ferber claimed that she had never seen Pitt in her shop. In 2020, Ferber hosted Luxembourgish chef Léa Linster at La Maison Ferber.

== Honours ==
In January 2018, Ferber was awarded a Chevalier (Knight) of the Legion of Honour.

== Works ==
- Ferber, Christine, Mes aigres-doux : Terrines et pâtés, Payot, 1999. ISBN 2228892408
- Ferber, Christine, Mes Confitures: The Jams and Jellies of Christine Ferber, Michigan State University Press, 2002. ISBN 0870136291
- Ferber, Christine, Ma cuisine des fruits, Marabout, 2003. ISBN 2501039106
- Ferber, Christine, Mes Tartes: The Sweet and Savory Tarts of Christine Ferber, Michigan State University Press, 2003. ISBN 0870136887
- Ferber, Christine; Model, Philippe; Winkelmann, Bernhard, La petite Cuisine d'Alice au pays des merveilles (Alice's Little Kitchen in Wonderland), Chêne Jeunesse, 2005. ISBN 2842777093
- Ferber, Christine, Tischlein deck dich!, Gerstenberg Verlag, 2008. ISBN 3836929856
- Ferber, Christine, Le Larousse des confitures : gelées, compotes, chutneys avec les conseils techniques et 40 recettes inédites de Christine Ferber, Larousse, Paris 2009. ISBN 978-2-03-584975-5
- Ferber, Christine, Leçons de confitures, Chêne, 2009. ISBN 2842778006
- Ferber, Christine; Bernhard, Winkelmann (photos), Die Marmeladen-Bibel, Christian, Munich 2010. ISBN 9783884729762
