= Boaz Keysar =

- בועז קיסר
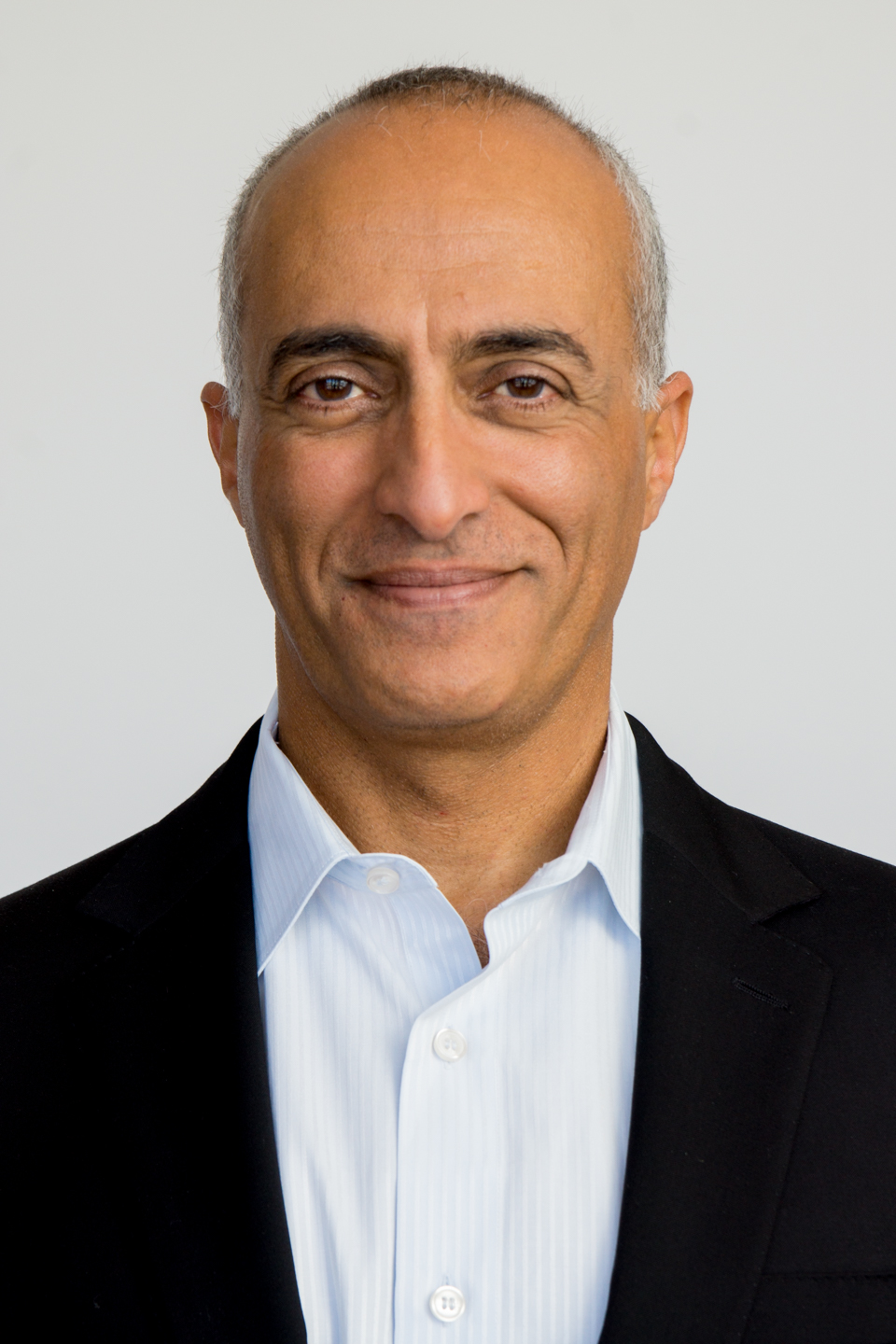
- Education: Hebrew University (BA); Princeton University(MA/PhD)
- Spouse: Linda E. Ginzel
- Scientific career
- Fields: Cognitive Psychology
- Doctoral advisor: Sam Glucksberg
- Website: Keysar Lab Website

Boaz Keysar (Hebrew: בועז קיסר) is the chair of the Cognition Program at the University of Chicago, and broadly researches communication, negotiation, and decision making.

== Biography ==
Keysar was born in Israel, and received a bachelor's degree in psychology and philosophy from the Hebrew University in 1984. Keysar later earned an M.A. and Ph.D. in Psychology from Princeton University in 1989 after moving to the United States, working under Sam Glucksberg. In 1991, after working as a post-doctoral scholar at Stanford University, Keysar joined the faculty of the University of Chicago as an assistant professor of psychology, and was later granted tenure in 1995 and promoted to full professor in 2002. Since 2005, Keysar has served as the chair of the Cognition Program.

== Awards ==
For his academic work, Keysar was awarded a Fulbright Scholarship while at Princeton University in 1985 and later on the John Simon Guggenheim Memorial Foundation Fellowship in 1997. Keysar received the Quantrell Award.

Keysar also has received a number of awards for his work as the co-founder of Kids In Danger, a nonprofit organization that works to improve children's product safety. Most notably, in 2000 both Keysar and his wife Linda E. Ginzel received the President's Volunteer Service Award from former president Bill Clinton for their work in raising awareness of the dangers of recalled children's products.

== Research ==
Keysar suggests that the framing effect in psychology disappears when encountering it in a foreign (non-native) language. One explanation of this disappearance is that a non-native language provides greater cognitive and emotional distance than one's native tongue. A foreign language is also processed less automatically than a native tongue. This leads to more deliberation, which can affect decision making, resulting in decisions that are more systematic.

== Publications ==
A list of Keysar's publications can be found online.
