= Richard Ferber =

American pediatrician

Richard Ferber is a physician and the director of The Center for Pediatric Sleep Disorders, at Children's Hospital Boston. He has been researching sleep and sleep disorders in children for over 30 years. He is best known for his methods—popularly called Ferberization—that purports to teach infants to learn how to fall asleep on their own, which are described in his book Solve Your Child's Sleep Problems (first edition 1985).

He graduated from Harvard College and Harvard Medical School.
