= Managerial psychology =

Managerial psychology is a sub-discipline of industrial and organizational psychology that focuses on the effectiveness of individuals and groups in the workplace, using behavioral science.

The purpose of managerial psychology is to aid managers in gaining a better managerial and personal understanding of the psychological patterns common among these individuals and groups.

- Managers can use managerial psychology to predict and prevent harmful psychological patterns within the workplace and to control psychological patterns to benefit the organisation long term.
- Managerial psychologists help managers, through research in theory, practice, methods and tools, to achieve better decision-making, leadership practices and development, problem solving and improve overall human relations.

== Managerial psychologists ==
In early years, managerial psychologists mainly studied fatigue, boredom, and other working conditions that could impede efficient work performance.

More recently, their contributions have expanded to include learning, perception, personality, emotions, training, leadership, effectiveness, needs and motivational forces, job satisfaction, decision-making processes, performance appraisals, attitude measurement, employee-selection techniques, work design, and job stress.

Managerial psychologists can also:

- study workplace productivity and morale,
- screen and train employees
- perform organizational development.
- perform consulting

== Personality, motivation and job satisfaction ==
Herzberg et al.’s seminal two-factor theory of motivation theorized that satisfaction and dissatisfaction were not two opposite extremes of the same sequence, but two separate entities caused by quite different facets of work – these were labelled as “hygiene factors” and “motivators”.

=== Hygiene factors ===
Hygiene factors are characterized as extrinsic components of job design that contribute to employee dissatisfaction if they are not met. Hygiene factors include:

- supervision
- working conditions
- company policies
- salary
- relations with co-workers

=== Motivators ===
Motivators are intrinsic to the job itself and include aspects such as

- achievement
- development
- responsibility
- recognition

Intrinsic factors have long been acknowledged as important determinants of motivation. There is a longstanding debate as to whether hygiene factors really contribute to job satisfaction. Most job satisfaction and motivation research literature is concerned with organisational or situational predictors (such as pay and supervision) while neglecting individual differences. It has also been discovered that individuals’ significantly differ in the way they perceive their jobs, even if the job description and the tasks they had to perform remained constant, thus suggesting that some individual differences must have an effect on work attitudes. Others also argued that individual disposition may have a profound influence over how the working world is perceived (i.e. what is important to the individual), and this is likely to affect the type of jobs that are sought.

=== The Ten Item Personality Inventory ===
The Ten Item Personality inventory was introduced in Gosling et al., (2003). The ten items of this measure are scored using a seven-point scale, with two statements (one reversed) used to measure each personality variable. The authors report extensive data showing good reliability and validity of this instrument.

=== The Work Values Questionnaire (WVQ) ===
The WVQ was introduced in Furnham et al., (2005). It consists of 37 items and requires individuals to report the extent to which intrinsic (e.g. responsibility and personal growth) and extrinsic (e.g. pay and benefits) components are important to them on a six-point scale. The WVQ is a revised version of Mantech's (1983) questionnaire. Previous studies have indicated that between two and four factors tend to be extracted, and that these often correspond to Herzberg et al.’s hygiene and motivator factors.

=== The Job Satisfaction Scale ===
The Job Satisfaction scale introduced by Warr et al., (1979). It consists of 15 items, seven of which measure intrinsic satisfaction, whilst the remaining eight measure extrinsic job satisfaction. Responses are given on a seven-point scale and can be summed to create and overall satisfaction score as well as an intrinsic and extrinsic value.

=== Experiment on personality, motivation and job satisfaction ===
A 2009 issue of Journal of Managerial Psychology presents an experiment with 202 full-time employees (81 males, mean age=38.3 and 121 females, mean age= 28.4) working in very different jobs in the retail, manufacturing and healthcare to investigate the extent to which personality and demographic factors explain variance in motivation and job satisfaction as defined by Herzberg et al.’s two-factor theory.

Every person was given three questionnaires ( the ten item personality inventory, work values questionnaire (WVQ), and job satisfaction scale) and had to complete them via a website.

- As predicted, personality and demographic variables were significant correlates of the extracted factors, accounting for between 9 and 15.2 per cent of the variance.
- Similarly, personality and demographic variables were also significantly related to all three job satisfaction scores and accounted for between 10.5 and 12.7 per cent of the variance.
- As expected, conscientiousness was a significant correlate of job satisfaction scores in both correlational and regressional analyses.
- Contrary to expectations, age, job tenure and years working full-time were not significantly related to job satisfaction scores;
- however, in line with predictions and the two-factor theory, job status was significantly associated with these scores.

Negative relationships were observed between the security and conditions factor and job status, as well as years in full-time employment. These results suggest that individuals with low job status (e.g. graduate positions and non-managerial roles) are more concerned with working conditions and clarity in their work than those of a higher status and individuals who have been working for longer periods.

These results further validate the contention that work attitudes are not the product of situational factors alone, and that both literature and organisations should further investigate the variables that contribute to these values with the intention of increasing job satisfaction and performance, through effective selection methods and pervasive job interventions.

== Tools used by managerial psychologists ==
=== Maslow's Hierarchy of Needs ===
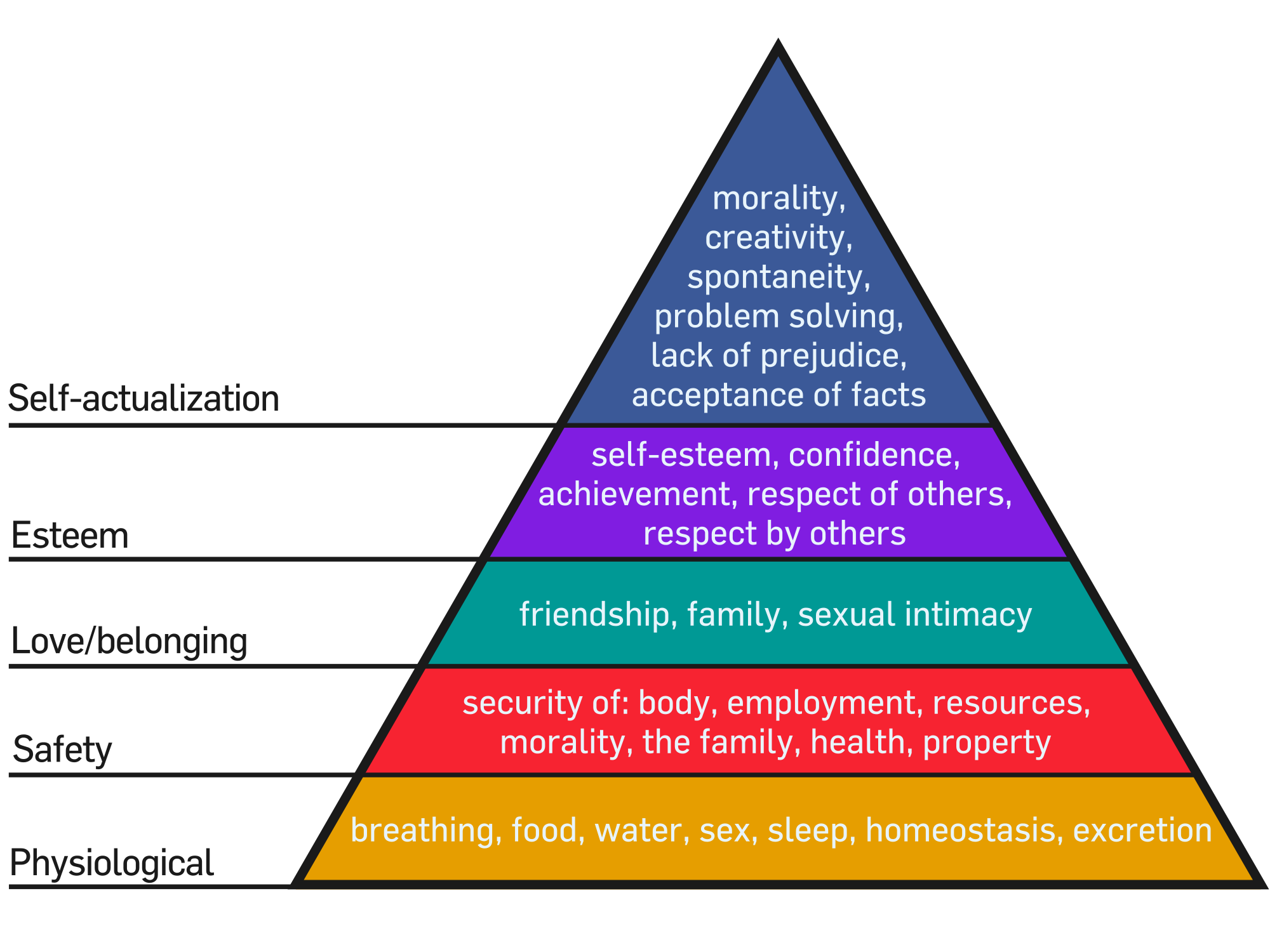
Maslow's Hierarchy of Needs

Abraham Maslow developed the Hierarchy of Needs model in the 1940-50s. Maslow's ideas surrounding the Hierarchy of Needs concern the responsibility of employers to provide a workplace environment that encourages and enables employees to fulfill their own unique potential (self-actualization).

While Maslow referred to various additional aspects of motivation, he expressed the Hierarchy of Needs in these five clear stages:

- Biological and Physiological needs - air, food, drink, shelter, warmth, sex, sleep, etc.
- Safety needs - protection from elements, security, order, law, limits, stability, etc.
- Belongingness and Love needs - work group, family, affection, relationships, etc.
- Esteem needs - self-esteem, achievement, mastery, independence, status, dominance, prestige, managerial responsibility, etc.
- Self-Actualization needs - realising personal potential, self-fulfillment, seeking personal growth and peak experiences.

=== Douglas McGregor's XY Theory ===
Douglas McGregor proposed his X-Y theory in his 1960 book 'The Human Side Of Enterprise'. Theory X and Theory Y are still referred to commonly in the field of management and motivation. McGregor's ideas suggest that there are two fundamental approaches to managing people. Many managers tend towards theory x, and generally get poor results. Enlightened managers use theory y, which produces better performance and results, and allows people to grow and develop.

==== Theory x ('authoritarian management' style) ====
- The average person dislikes work and will avoid it he/she can.
- Therefore, most people must be forced with the threat of punishment to work towards organisational objectives.
- The average person prefers to be directed; to avoid responsibility; is relatively unambitious, and wants security above all else.

==== Theory y ('participative management' style) ====
- Effort in work is as natural as work and play.
- People will apply self-control and self-direction in the pursuit of organisational objectives, without external control or the threat of punishment.
- Commitment to objectives is a function of rewards associated with their achievement.
- People usually accept and often seek responsibility.
- The capacity to use a high degree of imagination, ingenuity and creativity in solving organisational problems is widely, not narrowly, distributed in the population.
- In industry the intellectual potential of the average person is only partly utilised.

=== McClelland's Human Motivation Theory ===
See also Need theory

David McClelland in his 1961 book, "The Achieving Society " identified three motivators that he believed we all have:

- a need for achievement
- a need for affiliation
- a need for power

People will have different characteristics depending on their dominant motivator. According to McClelland, these motivators are learned (which is why this theory is sometimes called the Learned Needs Theory).

McClelland says that, regardless of our gender, culture, or age, we all have three motivating drivers, and one of these will be our dominant motivating driver. This dominant motivator is largely dependent on our culture and life experiences.

==== Achievement ====
People motivated by achievement need challenging, but not impossible, projects. They thrive on overcoming difficult problems or situations, so make sure you keep them engaged this way. People motivated by achievement work very effectively either alone or with other high achievers.

When providing feedback, give achievers a fair and balanced appraisal. They want to know what they're doing right – and wrong – so that they can improve.

==== Affiliation ====
People motivated by affiliation work best in a group environment, so try to integrate them with a team (versus working alone) whenever possible. They also don't like uncertainty and risk. Therefore, when assigning projects or tasks, save the risky ones for other people.

When providing feedback to these people, be personal. It's still important to give balanced feedback, but if you start your appraisal by emphasizing their good working relationship and your trust in them, they'll likely be more open to what you say. Remember that these people often don't want to stand out, so it might be best to praise them in private rather than in front of others.

==== Power ====
Those with a high need for power work best when they're in charge. Because they enjoy competition, they do well with goal-oriented projects or tasks. They may also be very effective in negotiations or in situations in which another party must be convinced of an idea or goal.

When providing feedback, be direct with these team members. And keep them motivated by helping them further their career goals
