= The Silver Platter =

Israeli television show

The Silver Platter (Hebrew: מגש הכסף) is a 3-episode documentary focused on Israel's economic and social issues, which was created by Doron Tsabari, one of Israel's most decorated documentary filmmakers, and Amir Ben-David. Tsabari is a film director and a professor of film and television at Sapir Academic College. Tsabari directed 11 films and television series and won 6 Ophir Awards, Israel most prestigious film award. The television format of “Connected”, the docu-reality series he created with producer Ram Landes, was sold for production to 28 countries, including United States, Russia, China, England, France, Spain and Australia.

Amir Ben-David is a writer, editor, journalist and musician. Ben David is currently the Chief Editor of Israel's Channel 10 morning show. Ben-David was the founder of “Avtipus”, a successful Israeli Rock band that rose to prominence in the mid-1990s. He also wrote lyrics and music for many other famous Israeli artists.

On November 9, 2016, the series also won the "Outstanding Television Documentary Project" of The Israeli Documentary Filmmakers Forum for 2016. Each of the episodes is centered around Israeli figures who played key roles in the debate on Israel's economy and society: Guy Rolnik, Yaron Zelekha and Daniel (Danny) Gutwein. The documentary sought to re-ignite the interest in the issues that were raised four years earlier, in July 2011, when a wave of social justice protests erupted in Israel – the biggest wave of protests Israel saw.

Many of the ideas expressed by the protesters were developed and campaigned for by Rolnik and TheMarker, the newspaper he founded and of which he was the Editor-in-Chief. All three – Rolnik, Gutwein and Zelekha – continued to support the movement's ideas, even after the protests subsided.

In A November 25, 2015 Bloomberg article, David Wainer wrote that “A wonkish TV show on Israel’s economy has struck a nerve in a country that usually reserves its fervor for debates about war and peace, giving new ammunition to opponents of government policies”, adding that “about one in eight Israelis tuned in to the three-part Silver Platter program, testimony to the depth of the discontent with the economy” and “Silver Platter has emerged as a cultural reference”.

The series, which was the winner of the 2015 documentary series award of the Israeli Academy of Film and Television, was viewed on television and online by about a million Israelis, about two-thirds of the country's adults 20 years old and older. The series was aired in October 2015 by Israel's Channel 8 and was also made available for viewing online, where it became popular. As of September 2016, the first chapter alone was viewed about 555,000 times on YouTube.

== Series content ==
=== Chapter 1, Guy Rolnik ===
The series’ first chapter, which was the most viewed, focuses on the campaign Guy Rolnik has been waging since 2008 as the founder and Editor-in-Chief of TheMarker newspaper for economic and social reforms and against the concentration of economic and political power in the hands of a handful of tycoons who dominated Israel's economy.

The chapter documents how, step-by-step, Rolnik, described in the chapter as “Israel’s most influential economics and business journalist”, identified some of the biggest illnesses of the Israeli economy and then used TheMarker as a platform to change public discourse, which resulted in significant legislation and policy changes. “Rolnik”, the documentary asserts, “not only reports on reality, he takes steps to change it. His articles have a huge effect on the public discourse.”

Rolnik's best known battle was against the concentration of economic power in few hands, the poster-child of which was Nochi Dankner, which controlled IDB, Israel's biggest business conglomerate. Nochi Dankner and his cousin, Danny Dankner, who was the chairman of Israel's biggest bank, Bank Hapoalim, controlled a quarter of the country's financial assets.

Rolnik's campaign resulted in a government-appointed committee against concentration, which led to a historic law, The Anti-Concentration Law, that forces break-ups of Israeli conglomerates and imposes many limitations on their ability to increase their economic power.

According to the Silver Platter, a week after the bill was approved by an overwhelming bi-partisan majority in Israel's Knesset, Nochi Dankner lost control of IDB as it was sold by an Israeli court to new owners.

Danny Dankner was indicted and convicted in two separate cases, one of which related to his activities at Bank Hapoalim, of obstructing the proper governance of a bank, bribery, money laundering and tax evasion. In both cases, he was sentenced to prison terms.

Nochi Dankner, who was, for a decade, the most powerful businessman in Israel, was indicted, charged and convicted of securities-related issues. The conviction was related to a February 2012 share issue of his holding company, IDB. TheMarker was the newspaper that exposed the inner workings of the share issue immediately after it was completed and raised its suspicions.

This battle resulted in a Government-appointed committee against concentration, which was followed by legislation. “One week later”, the chapter's narrator says, “Nochi Dankner lost control in IDB and was dispossessed of his assets.”

The documentary describes the campaign that Israel's tycoons waged against Rolnik. It describes the counter-campaign by most media outlets and by economists and experts hired by the tycoons to delegitimize the need for reform in Israel. The counter-campaign culminated in Nochi Dankner's takeover, in March 2011, of Maariv, Israel's second-largest newspaper at the time, as mouthpiece against Rolnik and the concentration committee.

A February 4, 2015, documentary on Israel's Channel 1 revealed that after Nochi Dankner took over Maariv, he gave instructions to the newspapers’ editors to go after Rolnik, and an Israeli NGO, the Movement for Quality Government in Israel, who fought for the breakup of concentration.

Shortly thereafter, in December 2013, Rolnik was awarded the Sokolov Prize for Life Time Achievement (The Israeli Pulitzer). “In his writing and work as the editor of TheMarker”, the prize committee member wrote, “Rolnik proved that courageous journalism based on independent and unbiased thinking, in-depth investigation and financial knowledge can bring about change in society and the economy.”

=== Chapter 2, Yaron Zelekha ===
The series’ second chapter is centered around Yaron Zelekha, Israel's former Chief Comptroller and later a whistle-blower. Zelekha also targets the Israeli public discourse, saying that it is deliberately veered away from economic and social issues and toward politics and intimidation.

In the chapter, Zelekha asserts that Israel's poverty rate is among the Western World's highest even though it is not a poor country and that competitiveness is low, which pushes prices higher. Zelekha is filmed wandering through a supermarket's shelf demonstrating how an apparent variety of brands creates the impression of competition, which is false since most of these brands are produced by a handful of companies.

=== Chapter 3, Danny Gutwein ===
The final chapter is focused on Danny Gutwein, a professor at the University of Haifa’s Department of Jewish History. Gutwein publicly opposes privatization and promotes renationalization of formerly privatized services.

In the episode, Gutwein compares between Finland, a Social Democratic state, and Israel. According to Gutwein, since 1977, the year when the Israeli right-wing party, the Likud, first came to power, Israel abandoned is Social-Democratic heritage, first by obliterating the old economy with hyperinflation and later privatization.

== Media coverage ==
The series has attracted considerable media attention.

In an October 25, 2015 article in Haaretz (Hebrew), television critic Shany Littman wrote that “Doron Tsabari and Amir Ben-David are providing Israeli citizens with a very valuable service. In three charismatic, clear and stirring lectures, combined with animation and interviews, they succeed in placing an important asset on Israel’s documentary films’ shelf.”

In an October 26, 2015 article in Maariv (Hebrew), Galit Edut interviewed the series’ producer, Dana Cohen as saying: “’The series does not attack anyone or personally. It does not attack groups either. Rather, we point our finger toward the system that lets them have their way’.”

In an October 27, 2015 article in Walla! (Hebrew), Ilan Kaprov wrote that “The Silver Platter” is “one of the most important series ever viewed on Israeli screens”. He also wrote that the series ingredients “have to send us to the streets and push us to demand change. Now.”

In an October 28, 2015 TimeOut article (Hebrew), television critic Amit Kling wrote that “the series’ basic premise is essentially modernistic: we will fight ignorance, and this way the people will know who the bad guys are and take to the streets. But this is not the case and this is not the era that we live in. Those who want to be exposed to this information is already inundated with it.”

In an October 28, 2015 Times of Israel article, Simona Weinglass wrote that “At time when Israel is averaging several stabbing attacks or attempted attacks per day, it’s odd that a television show about the economy would capture the public imagination. But that is the feat of ‘Silver Platter’.” Weinglass added that the documentary “is a devastating indictment of an economic system they say has grown so concentrated and extractive that Israel could soon rival countries like Rwanda and Namibia in its levels of corruption.” In her story, Weinglass also described the considerable discussion the series spawned on social media, especially Facebook and Twitter.

== The Rolnik Report ==
Two years after “The Silver Platter”, Rolnik and Tsabari cooperated again, this time in creating a highly critical documentary on Bank Hapoalim, Israel's biggest bank. The documentary, the total time of which is 53 minutes, was aired in five daily installments, between May 15, 2017, and May 19, 2017, during the first week of operation of Israel's recently launched Israeli Public Broadcasting Corporation, or “Kan”. The installments were embedded in the main newscast of Kan.

The documentary describes how some of the bank's owners, especially Nochi Dankner and his cousin Danny Dankner, used its resources and market power for their own good and for the good of a very small group of businesspeople and their interests. In one case, the bank continued to protect and provide credit to a member of the small group of businesspeople, Eliezer Fishman, years after he was apparently insolvent. It was the first time that a television channel broadcast such a critical story of such a big Israeli business entity.

On May 22, 2017, an Israeli media watchdog, wrote about the documentary, which is described as the “crown jewel” of Kan's newscast:

"Doron Tsabari’s and Guy Rolnik’s series is the main draw of the newscast, if not its only one. Rolnik repeats here the successful formula he used two years ago in 'The Silver Platter'... the series is riveting, educating, helpful and well presented (graphics, sound). It provides an important public service even though it feels like a campaign rather than an objective journalistic report. Rolnik, who is a guest in the newscast, has the energy and the journalistic charisma that one can wish will be a role model to the channel’s permanent staff."
