= Ann Lurie =

American philanthropist and nurse (1944/1945–2024)

Ann Lurie (1944/1945 – June 24, 2024) was an American philanthropist and nurse who founded the Ann and Robert H. Lurie Foundation with her husband Robert H. Lurie in 1986. She grew up in Miami, Florida, studying nursing at the University of Florida and working as a nurse. In 1973, she was attracted by the diversity and culture of Chicago and moved there to work as a pediatric intensive care nurse at Children's Memorial Hospital, now named the Lurie Children's Hospital in honor of her contributions. After her husband Robert Lurie's death in 1990, Ann Lurie dedicated herself to philanthropic work with her late husband's estate of $425 million. She became known for her generosity in health care, education, social services, and various other sectors, both locally in Chicago and worldwide. Notably, she donated large sums to the Ann & Robert H. Lurie Children’s Hospital of Chicago, Greater Chicago Food Depository, PAWS Chicago, and more. In 2014, she remarried to filmmaker Mark Muheim in Jackson, Wyoming. She died on June 24, 2024 at the age of 79 from complications from a recent illness, survived by her husband, her six children, 16 grandchildren, and Muheim's two sons.

== Philanthropic projects ==
- She was president and treasurer of the Ann and Robert H. Lurie Foundation, founded in 1986.
- Ann Lurie was president of Lurie Investments, the venture capital arm of the Ann and Robert H. Lurie Foundation that backs healthcare-related tech companies.
- After going on safari in Africa, Lurie realized that many sick African children had nowhere to go to seek care. In response, she founded and served as president of Africa Infectious Disease Village Clinics, Inc. (AID Village Clinics), providing public health services to rural Kenyan communities through a mobile trailer equipped with sophisticated healthcare technology. This aided thousands of Kenyans both directly through the provision of healthcare and indirectly through the creation of jobs at the clinic. She funded this project with $8 million a year, which became unsustainable in 2012, forcing her to close down the clinic.

== Donations ==
Some of Ann Lurie's notable donations are listed below:

- In 2000, Lurie provided funds for the construction and maintenance for the PAWS Chicago Lurie Spay/Neuter Clinic, supporting PAWS Chicago's vision of a No Kill Chicago by reducing pet homelessness and euthanasia in Chicago.
- In 2000, Lurie funded 10 village schools in southern Ethiopia with the amount of $700,000. This continued in 2008, where 10 more schools were built with Lurie's donation of $650,000, changing the lives of thousands of children.
- In 2004, her $10 million donation made the construction of the Lurie Garden in Millenium Park, Chicago possible.
- In 2004, Lurie helped finance the launch of the Greater Chicago Food Depository facility and continued to contribute to it over three decades of donations. She was also a regular volunteer at the food pantry.
- In 2007, Lurie donated $100 million to Children's Memorial Hospital, allowing the construction of its Streeterville location that is now named Lurie Children's Hospital. At the time, this was the largest gift to any children's hospital anywhere, and it remains the largest gift to the hospital.
- Lurie's husband Robert Lurie underwent cancer treatment at Northwestern University, forming a connection between Ann and the university that would last for decades. Over the years, Ann Lurie has donated $60 million to Northwestern University and was a Northwestern life trustee. With these donations, she has endowed the Robert H. Lurie Comprehensive Cancer Center of Northwestern University and the Robert H. Lurie Medical Research Center.
- She has donated $37 million to her husband's alma mater, the University of Michigan, funding its Robert H. Lurie Engineering Center.
- She permanently endowed a Christmas party for children and seniors in need at the St. Vincent de Paul Center.
- She provided funds for the Joan and Irving J. Harris Dance Theater.
- She was a longtime generous supporter of archaeological dig sites of the Ancient Egypt Research Association in Giza, Egypt.

== Acknowledgements ==
Ann Lurie's generosity and contributions were greatly acknowledged by many, notably including the city of Chicago. In 2004, Chicago named a four-block-long street on the Southwest Side Ann Lurie Place in her honor. Upon her death, Chicago mayor Brandon Johnson said that “the City of Chicago [has lost] a true flagbearer of philanthropy whose contributions have touched countless lives.”
