= Israel's Anti-Concentration Law =

2013 Israeli law

- Territorial extent: Israel
- Enacted: December 2013

Israel's Anti-Concentration Law, formally “A Law for Promotion of Competition and Reduction of Concentration”, is a law passed in December 2013 that seeks to reduce the size of existing large Israeli business groups organized in a pyramidal holding structures, separate financial holdings from non-financial holdings and prevent new pyramids from being formed.

The law was approved by Israel's Knesset with no objections and included both coalition and opposition parties: 42 coalition Knesset members and 30 opposition Knesset members voted for the law, an extremely rare result in the Knesset's history.

The Anti-Concentration Law is arguably the broadest-reaching economic policy measure taken by an Israeli government since the 1985 Israel Economic Stabilization Plan, which helped the country fight hyperinflation. In a January 7, 2014, New York Times article titled “Overhaul of Israel’s Economy Offers Lessons for United States” Steven Davidoff wrote that “with a single bill and a few big changes in its corporate law, Israel is looking to overhaul its economy and hopefully reduce income inequality”.

The law followed the creation of a committee, on October 24, 2010, whose final recommendations were handed in February 2012. The committee's work has taken a dramatic turn and accelerated considerably following the wave of social justice protests that swept Israel during the summer of 2011.

The issue of the concentration of economic power in few hands and its effect on competitiveness, prices, productivity, innovation and politics and lawmaking was campaigned for since 2008 by TheMarker, a leading Israeli business publication.

An October 15, 2015 article in Financial Times stated that: “…it is the role that the business newspaper TheMarker has played in Israel in exposing the effect on the national economy of the concentration of power and wealth in the hands of a few billionaires”.

In a March 23, 2015 article titled “How To Fix American Journalism” in The Nation, Michael Massing wrote: “… TheMarker, an Israeli financial newspaper distributed as a supplement to Haaretz, waged an unflagging campaign beginning in the mid-2000s against the extraordinary concentration of economic power in Israel and the dangers that this development posed to Israeli society and democracy. Led by its founding editor, Guy Rolnik, the paper ran periodic stories and columns that paid special attention to the ‘Israeli oligarchs,’ a small group of billionaires and their families who controlled much of the Israeli economy. When the campaign began, the subject of economic concentration was barely discussed in Israel. The stories fed growing outrage over inequality, leading to a series of mass demonstrations in 2011. Those protests, in turn, spurred the Knesset to pass a bill to break up the Israeli conglomerates. It was a remarkable display of how one news organization, through tenacious and unflinching reporting over a period of years, can help spur systemic change.”

Also, in a December 11, 2013, HaAyin HaShevi'it, an independent watchdog that focuses on the Israeli press, wrote that “For better or for worse, those who made concentration a major discussion topic are TheMarker, led by Rolnik. This is definitely an exceptional example, not only in Israel, of a media outlet that successfully employs an aggressive, but also creative and diverse, campaign to significantly influence the public discourse to the point of pushing for a law that is expected to lead to major changes in the economy’s structure.”

== Evidence of concentration ==
In April 2008, Bank of Israel published a paper by research economist Konstantin Kosenko, “Evolution of Business Groups in Israel: Their Impact at the Level of the Firm and the Economy”, in which Kosenko wrote: “Using panel data on 650 public companies from 1995 to 2006, we identify twenty major business groups controlling about 160 listed companies and close to a half of total stock market capitalization, while the 10 largest groups' segment of the market capitalization is among the largest in the western world and amounts to 30 percent. These groups are family-controlled and highly diversified across different industries with common pyramidal structure of ownership: roughly 80 percent of all group-affiliated companies belong to business pyramids. Business groups are dominant especially in the financial sector, where half of banks and insurance companies are group-affiliated.” A December, 2011 economic survey of Israel by the OECD mentioned this paper.

In its annual report for 2009, Bank of Israel wrote: “Israel is one of the most concentrated developed countries and even resembles a developing country in this respect (Figure 2). Israel’s business groups are typified by broad sectoral dispersion, a significant tendency to focus on the financial sector, strong maturity of affiliated firms in terms of both age and size, slow growth, and higher levels of financial leverage—and therefore also of risk—among affiliated than among stand-alone companies.”

The report also stated that: “On the basis of the totality of findings about their activities, one may include Israel’s business groups among the entities that have the latent potential of systemic risk. This is because their activity satisfies two main criteria in the test of systemic risk: both their economic size and their complexity—in terms of concentration of control, ownership structure, and sectoral interrelations with financial and real institutions—create the probability of a spillover effect in the event of their failure, make it difficult to analyze information about their activity, and, in turn, make it hard to assess the risks of this activity and its relation with overall system stability.”

In its interim report, released on October 11, 2011, the committee concludes that the Israeli economy is concentrated, both in the real and financial sectors; that a few holding groups, that have a pyramidal holding structure, control disproportionally large portions of the Israeli economy; that these groups are typically active both in real and financial sectors; and that this structure creates a situation where they are competitors, suppliers and customers of each other.

=== Pyramidal structure ===
The interim report concludes that the Israeli economy as concentrated: “a clear majority (88%) of Israeli publicly-traded companies are characterized by a concentrated holding structure, meaning they have at least one controlling shareholder. In more than a third of the companies, the controlling shareholder holds less than 50% of the capital. A majority of the market capitalization is held by business groups (68%). The prevalent holding structure within Israeli holding groups is pyramidal (in 79% of the groups the structure contains at least two layers of publicly-traded companies. Additionally, the average controlling premium in Israel is among the highest in the world.”

The report also identifies the most influential groups: “24 business groups control 136 (about 23%) publicly-traded companies out of 596 publicly-traded companies.” Focusing on the 10 biggest groups, the report finds that their holding rate is the highest among OECD members.

=== Financial and non-financial holdings ===
The interim report also concludes that “the Israeli financial sector is characterized by a very high degree of concentration, both relative to the economy’s concentration and to financial sectors in other countries: the five biggest banking groups hold about 99% of public deposits and the six biggest financial groups manage about 69% of the public’s long-term savings. As a result of regulatory demands, almost all Israeli financial entities in Israel have controlling shareholders, and some of the major financial entities have controlling shareholders that also have real holdings.”

The report than describes the close ties between the groups and their controlling shareholders: “Most business groups are active in a few markets, a fact that brings them together in various markets, whether as competitors, suppliers and each other’s customers.”

== Concentration in the Israeli banking sector ==
For decades, banking is one of the most concentrated industries in Israel. According to Bank of Israel data, the combined share of two largest banks, Bank Hapoalim and Bank Leumi, in consumer credit is almost 70% of the total consumer credit of all five biggest banks.

The banking sector was a major target of TheMarker's campaign against concentration. During 2017, TheMarker campaigned for the creation of a parliamentary inquiry committee to investigate the loans that the banks extended to top Israeli business people. In June 2017 the Knesset, Israel's parliament, voted on the creation of such a committee. The committee's hearings are still ongoing.

During its late October 2018 sessions, the CEO of Bank Hapoalim and the Chairman of Bank Leumi made unexpectedly positive comments about the concentration committee and the ensuing law., These comments were surprising since in 2010 and 2011, while the notion of concentration was still debated, bank executives denied that there is a significant problem of concentration in the Israeli economy.

The inquiry committee itself offered an explanation as to how the cooperation between the banking system and concentrated businesses comes at the expense of consumers and dispersed public. Its economic advisers claim that the financial system provides superior credit terms to large, multi-layered, borrowers who use the resources to generate income by extracting rents rather than by activities that create wide benefit. The rent-extracting activities that were mentioned by the committee's advisers are concentration, stifling competition, influencing reforms and regulations and other activities that require power over decision makers.

TheMarker has been pushing for banking sector reform in various occasions in the past too. TheMarker repeatedly pushed for the implementation of the recommendations of a 1985 inquiry committee (the “Bejski Commission”): to force banks to sell their asset management operations so as not to put them in a conflict of interests with their role as investment advisors. Eventually, in 2004 then-Finance Minister Benjamin Netanyahu appointed a new commission who reached similar recommendations that were adopted and implemented.

Subsequent commissions were also pushed for and supported by TheMarker, e.g. the 2011 Trajtenberg Committee, which recommended that banking sector concentration be confronted. This recommendation was adopted the same year with the creation of another committee (the “Zaken Committee”), which called for a few steps meant to increase competition in the banking sector and cut consumer costs. Additionally, in June 2015 a new committee was formed (the “Strum Committee”), whose recommendations to force banks to sell their credit card companies were adopted too (see below).

== Nochi Dankner and Danny Dankner ==
Concentration of economic power was mostly associated with the Dankner family, that together controlled around $100 billion, or a fifth of all financial assets in Israel at the time.

Israeli businessman Nochi Dankner was the head of Israel's biggest conglomerate, the IDB Group. His close ally was his first cousin, Danny Dankner, who was the chairman of Israel's biggest bank, Bank Hapoalim.

In May 2003, a group led by Nochi Dankner bought the controlling stake of IDB Group, later increasing the stake through open-market purchases.

In its peak, IDB Group's holdings included controlling stakes in Cellcom – one of the biggest cellular providers in Israel; Shufersal, the biggest supermarket chain; Clal Insurance, one of Israel's biggest insurance companies; MA Industries, a producer of crop protection products; Nesher – Israel's cement monopoly; Assets and Construction – a large commercial real estate company; and American Israeli Paper Mills, a large producer of paper products. In March 2011, five months after Netanyahu created the concentration committee, Nochi Dankner's IDB bought Maariv, a daily newspaper.

According to a list made public by the Israeli Ministry of Finance, that includes 1,786 real sector concentrated entities affected by the law, the number of such entities related to IDB was the biggest: 232.

Nochi Dankner is a descendant of the Dankner family, who has been a major player in Israeli business for decades. The family's oldest asset was Israel Salt Industries, founded in 1922 and sold to the Dankner family in 1957.

In 1997 the family was part of a group led by Ted Arison, who bought the controlling stake in Bank Hapoalim, Israel's biggest bank. Until he bought IDB, Nochi Dankner was a member of the bank's board of directors, but his cousin and close ally, Danny Dankner, remained a board member, later to become vice chairman and then chairman of the board, a position he was forced to relinquish in June 2009.

Until that time, through Clal Insurance, Israel's biggest insurer, and Bank Hapoalim, the two cousins oversaw the largest share of the Israeli financial sector.

In November 2012 Nochi Dankner was arrested on suspicions regarding securities-related issues related to a February 2012 share issue by IDB Holdings. In January 2014, a day after he lost control over IDB, Dankner was called to a hearing prior to charges being brought up against him. In June 2014 he was formally indicted, in July 2016 he was found guilty of all charges and on December 5, 2016, he was sentenced to two years in prison.

On August 29, 2018, the Israeli Supreme Court rejected Dankner's appeal and increased his prison sentence from two years to three years. Immediately after the appeal was rejected, Shalom Yerushalmi, a former top journalist for Maariv, the newspaper Dankner bought in 2011, wrote: “A significant part of Dankner’s wars were waged against TheMarker, which exposed the tycoon’s dubious actions…”. A month later, on October 2, 2018, he started serving his sentence.

In an April 2013 commentary HaAyin HaShevi'it described the dynamic between Dankner and TheMarker thus: “TheMarker is a significant contributor to the collapse of [Nochi Dankner’s holding company] IDB: the cell phone market [competition] reform, that tore apart one of Dankner’s conglomerate’s major profit engines, was strongly and unabashedly supported by TheMarker and [its then tech editor] Amir Teig. Lately, it was TheMarker that drew the light to a debt settlement in the works between one of the companies in Dankner’s holding pyramid and Bank Leumi. The speed at which other newspapers and the public in social media adopted TheMarker’s stance - and the eventual decision by Bank Leumi to abandon the settlement - proved that even that, in reality, the fight is still raging on, TheMarker’s defeat of Dankner on the fight over perception and consciousness was, in fact, a knockout.”

And a few days after Dankner started serving his sentence, HaAyin HaShevi'it wrote: “Rolnik, the only economic commentator that did not kneel and bow before Dankner that was the most powerful tycoon in Israel. Rolnik played a critical role in turning Dankner from a “going concern” in the hearts and minds of the business journalists and owners of their newspapers to a “doubts about its ability to continue as a going concern“ in the financial reports of the IDB group.”

In April 2009, Haaretz reported that the then Governor of the Bank of Israel, Stanley Fischer, met secretly with Shari Arison, then the controlling shareholder of Bank Hapoalim, and demanded that she remove Danny Dankner from his position as chairman of the bank. Fischer said that he lost confidence in Dankner following a string of apparent failures. Arison refused.

Since the conversation was published, TheMarker stood behind Fischer and called for the removal of Dankner. Eventually, on June 1, 2009, Dankner handed his resignation to Bank Hapoalim's board.

Danny Dankner was also charged, and finally convicted, in two separate cases, one related to Bank Hapoalim.

On October 17, 2013, Dankner entered e plea bargain and was convicted of, among other things, obstructing the proper governance of the bank. Additionally, in April 2010 Dankner was arrested on suspicion of, among other things, bribery, money laundering and tax evasion regarding a big real estate project in Jerusalem, the Holyland Case. On March 31, 2014, he was found guilty. Another person charged in this case and found guilty was Israel's former Prime Minister, Ehud Olmert. Both Dankner and Olmert were sentenced to prison.

On June 11, 2009, after Danny Dankner resigned from Bank Hapoalim, Fischer gave an interview to TheMarker. In the interview, following a question regarding the reasons for his decision to force Dankner out, Fischer referred to a paper by Randall Morck, Daniel Wolfenzon and Bernard Yeung from September 2005, “Corporate Governance, Economic Entrenchment, and Growth”, from which he read a single paragraph: “Around the world, large corporations usually have controlling owners, who are usually very wealthy families. Outside the U.S. and the U.K., pyramidal control structures, cross shareholding and super voting rights are common. Using these devices, a family can control corporations without making a commensurate capital investment. In many countries, such families end up controlling considerable proportions of their countries’ economies. Three points emerge. First, at the firm level, these ownership structures vest dominant control rights with families who often have little real capital invested – creating agency and entrenchment problem simultaneously. In addition, controlling shareholders can divert corporate resources for private benefits using transactions within the pyramidal group. The result is a poor utilization of resources. At the economy level, extensive control of corporate assets by a few families distorts capital allocation and reduces the rate of innovation. The result is an economy-wide misallocation of resources, and slower economic growth. Second, political influence is plausibly related to what one controls, rather than what one owns. The controlling owners of pyramids thus have greatly amplified political influence relative to their actual wealth. They appear to influence the development of both public policy, such as property rights protection and enforcement, and institutions like capital markets."

== The law ==
The two major parts of the law limit control in business groups that have a pyramidal holding structure and separates between major real corporations and major financial corporations. Other chapters include provisions regarding the consideration of concentration in granting state rights and general provisions.

=== Pyramidal holding structure ===
The law states that new pyramidal holding structures will have no more than two layers, that within four years structures will be reduced to three layers and that within six years they will be reduced to two layers.

=== Separating real holdings from financial holdings ===
The law bars a controlling shareholder in a major real entity (a real entity whose yearly turnover or credit exceeds 6 billion shekels, approximately 1.5 billion dollars) from holding a major financial entity (a financial entity whose assets exceed 40 billion shekels, approximately 10 billion dollars). Also, a financial entity will hold no more than 10% of a major real entity and the holder of at least 5% of a major real entity will not control of a major financial entity.

=== Affected groups and businesspeople ===
According to the list made public by the Israeli Ministry of Finance, the real sector concentrated entities affected by the law include: IDB Group (then controlled by Nochi Dankner), the Yitzhak Tshuva group (controlled by Yitzhak Tshuva), the Ofer brothers group (controlled by Eyal Ofer and Idan Ofer), Africa Israel Group (controlled by Lev Leviev), Bezeq-Eurocom Group (controlled by Shaul Elovitch), the Paz Group (controlled by Zadik Bino), the Fishman group (formerly controlled by Eliezer Fishman), Alon Blue Square Group, Gazit-Globe Group (controlled by Chaim Katzman), The Israel Corporation Group (also controlled by Eyal Ofer and Idan Ofer), the Wertheim group (founded by Muzi Wertheim, deceased), Clal Industries group (controlled by Len Blavatnik), and the Azrieli Group (founded by David Azrieli, deceased).

== TheMarker’s campaign ==
TheMarker, since the newspaper was founded in 2000, pointed out the many distortions in the Israeli economy, but in 2008-2009, after the 2008 financial crisis, the newspaper increased its focus on the concentration of economic power in few hands. In these articles, the businesspeople who control the big conglomerates were described as “tycoons”, a term that became to bear resemblance to “Robber barons”.

The Campaign consisted of hundreds of analyses, columns, features and investigative pieces on the monopoly power of the many big companies that where controlled by tycoons, the duopoly banks, the close ties between big business and media and the difference between pro-market and pro-business economic policies.

== The Brandeis approach to antitrust and concentration ==
In a June 2010 special edition, TheMarker and Rolnik called on Israeli politicians, regulators and civil society to adopt a “Brandeisian” approach to antitrust and economic policy. U.S. Supreme Court Justice Louis Brandeis is well known for his approach to antitrust that focuses on the importance of fighting “bigness” - the concentration of economic and political power in the hands of the few in the beginning of 20th century U.S. TheMarker's special edition was dedicated to the role of Justice Brandeis in fighting the American oligarchy in the U.S and in its opening column Rolnik called for a Brandiesian movement in Israel to curtail the increasing power of the Israeli oligarchy. "In taking on power-hungry tycoons 100 years ago” Rolnik wrote, “Louis Brandeis became the social conscience of the most capitalist country in the world. Who will be Israel’s savior from the oligarchs?”

== Adoption of the Brandeisian view ==
The campaign of TheMarker, Rolnik and civic groups such as the Movement for Quality Government in Israel eventually prevailed. The report of the concentration October 2010 committee, the eventual law and Israel's Antitrust Authority all adopted some of the ideas of a political view of antitrust, aka the Brandeisian view of antitrust. For example, the committee's final report states that “pyramidal [corporate] structures enable the creation of business and even political lobbies that results in the economic entrenchment of business groups and their owners”. Also, the explanatory notes to the anti-concentration law state that: “A small number of large holding groups currently control a significant share of the crucial infrastructure that the State has thus far allocated. These groups have accumulated significant power, among other things, because of the rights granted to them. Economy-wide concentration considerations are designed to disperse the power given to holders of national infrastructure…”. And, finally, a January 2017 document by Israel's Antitrust Authority stated that “… the fear underlying the thesis of the existence of economy-wide concentration is of the exertion of bargaining power over the decision-making level.”

The Israeli Antitrust Authority's 2017 document outlines the way that economic power and concentration will be accounted for in decisions by the government and the antitrust authority. The brief adopted two ideas that were promoted and primed by TheMarker for years: concentration of economic power leads to great risk of both Regulatory capture and “media capture”. According to the document, economic concentration raises the risk of regulatory capture and media capture. The brief asserts that business groups that gain significant economic power can have power vis-à-vis the regulators and that businesses that have investments and holdings in the news media in their portfolio may potentially have influence over politicians and regulators.

The concepts related to the connection between economy-wide concentration and economic policy and regulation were a main theme in the campaign of TheMarker. In 2014, Samuel Neaman Institute, a leading research institute within Israel's Technion, awarded Rolnik a grant to conduct a study on the connection between regulatory capture and concentration. Rolnik wrote the study in Harvard University, where he was a fellow in 2014-2015. In January 2015 Rolnik presented the findings in the keynote address of Israel's Antitrust Authority annual event with his co-author, Dr. Roy Shapira from Harvard Law School.

== The counter-campaign ==
Among all major Israeli newspapers, TheMarker was the only one that put concentration on the agenda, primed it and framed it as harmful to the economy and as an issue that is not partisan. Other newspapers ignored or opposed it.

The counter-campaign was led by Globes and Yedioth Ahronoth. Between 1999 and 2016 Globes was controlled by Israeli tycoon Eliezer Fishman. Fishman was also the second-biggest investor in Yedioth Ahronoth, which is controlled by Arnon Mozes and was for four decades the most popular and powerful newspaper in Israel. In late 2016, following the collapse of Fishman's business empire, court documents that were handed to the court by him and the banks that lent him money, revealed that, in the decade prior to its collapse, Fishman's debts to banks were much larger than his assets and that he had trouble paying them off. The Israeli investigative television program Uvda included testimonies of journalists that said that Globes’ editorial line was meant to thwart reforms meant to increase banking reforms and contain the power of Israel's biggest businesspeople. This helped in insulating Fishman and his lender banks and letting him maintain control of his empire for a decade even though it was, in fact, owned by Israel's banking duopoly – Hapoalim and Leumi.

According to HaAyin HaShevi'it, TheMarker is the only newspaper who fought against concentration while most newspapers tried to delegitimize it or to water it down.

In February 2010, HaAyin HaShevi'it wrote that when an economics commentator of one newspaper mocks the idea of concentration, “it is clear to all who he is pointing his arrows at: TheMarker”. Similarly, in a May 2010 post referring to another commentary by another newspaper opposing the fight against concentration, HaAyin HaShevi'it wrote that he “does not mention TheMarker by name, but hints about a campaign that it has been running lately against concentration”.

HaAyin HaShevi'it also reported on the comments made by yet another commentator. In a May 2015 post, it wore: “This week, as in most weeks, [this newspaper] aggressively criticizes his colleagues from TheMarker: ‘a certain group of journalists’ he writes about them and adds: ‘the knights of justice’, ‘the media’s purists’, ‘a closed and frightened tribe that is leaning on its scriptures and recites all kinds of empty slogans on concentration and competitiveness veiled as fake concern for consumers’”.

Following Nochi Dankner’s conviction, HaAyin HaShevi'it wrote that along with him, most of the Israeli press should have been convicted: “The problem is, of course, that it was a trial that the Israeli press could not attend because it should have been sitting next to Dankner as a defendant. After all, the overwhelming majority of the Israeli press – except few reporters and after that a whole newspaper, TheMarker – was part of the felony by action or inaction. In fact, Dankner could not have operated alone without that full and close partnership of the mainstream media and some of its leading reporters”.

== Objections to the committee and the law ==
Apart from the press, the committee was also met with objections, mainly from executives and corporations that stood to be affected by the recommendations.

In a paper filed with the committee in March 2011, IDB claimed that (1) there is no connection between concentration and competitiveness (2) concentration in Israel is average relative to other countries (3) the concentration in Israel is in a gradual process of decline, and (4) concentration is not addressed by any regulatory agency of any country.

In its paper, IDB cited OECD Secretary General José Ángel Gurría, who said in 2010 that in the last generation, Israel's competitiveness has improved “beyond recognition”; and the former Chief Justice of Israel's Supreme Court, Aharon Barak, who wrote in 1998 that “the relative small size of the Israeli economy justifies – and makes possible – a high concentration relative to other countries”.

== The committee’s work ==
The committee tasked with recommending on ways to increase competitiveness and decrease concentration was formed in October 2010. The committee was supposed to present its recommendations by March 2011, but the deadline was extended a few times. Its members came from the Prime Minister's Office, the Finance Ministry, Bank of Israel, the Antitrust Authority, the Securities Authority and the Attorney General.

In the meantime, many of its original members left, three of which for high-paid positions in the private sector: Rony Hizkiyahu and Udi Nisan left for the Yitzhak Tshuva group and Zohar Goshen started consulting Nochi Dankner. Following the July 2011 social justice protests, and in order to respond to the protesters’ demands, Netanyahu replaced the positions that were vacated.

In October 2011 the committee issued its interim report and issued its final report in February 2012.

== The social protests and the Trajtenberg Committee ==
In July 2011, a wave of social protests, the biggest in Israel's history, erupted and swept the country for almost two months. Its peak came on September 3, 2011, when about half a million protesters went to the streets in many cities across the country.

The demonstrators, who adopted the slogan “The people demands social justice”, protested the high cost of living, especially housing and food, against inequality, against the banking system and against concentration.

Seeing the protests as a threat to his government, Netanyahu formed, in August 2011, the “Committee for Economic and Social change”, which was tasked with examining and proposing solutions to Israel's socio-economic problems. The committee was headed by economist Prof. Manuel Trajtenberg and was as informally known as the Trajtenberg Committee.

In the epilog of its recommendations, which were published on September 26, 2011, the committee wrote: “The committee finds that there is considerable concentration in many of the Israeli economy’s markets as well as infrastructure. This concentration is manifested by difficulties and failures owing to barriers to entry of new, local entrants, barriers to imports and barriers to market expansion and innovation”.

These finding further strengthened the conviction that Israel does suffer from a problem of concentration and pushed to Concentration Committee, which was yet to publish its interim report, to follow suit.

== Similar policies campaigned for by TheMarker ==
In the years leading up to the law and the years after the law was enacted TheMarker campaigned for and supported other related issues:

=== Cellular market reform ===
TheMarker convinced and later supported Moshe Kahlon, while he was Minister of Communications (2009-2013 to reform the cellular market, which he saw as uncompetitive, by introducing Mobile Virtual Network Operators (MVNOs). The move was strongly opposed by all incumbent players, two of which are owned by concentrated groups, as well as by most newspapers. Eventually, in 2010, the reform was enacted, resulting in significantly reduced consumer bills and, according to a Ministry of Finance paper, in 17.5 million shekels (approximately 4.6 billion dollars) of total economy savings up to 2014.

=== Bankers’ pay ===
TheMarker has been pushing for many years for capping bank executives’ pay as, according to newspaper, their pay did not reflect market forces but rather the banking duopoly, the regulation that protects them from competition and corporate governance failure. On March 3, 2016, and with no objections, Israel's Knesset approved a bill that capped the maximum yearly pay in financial intuitions recognized for tax purposes at 2.5 million shekels (approximately 650 thousand dollars). In addition, CEOs’ pay would not exceed 35 times the wages of the lowest-paid employee, including people employed via contractors.

=== Banking sector reform ===
On September 1, 2016, a committee created by Finance Minister Moshe Kahlon and the Bank of Israel's Governor Karnit Flug, recommended that Israel's two biggest banks, Hapoalim and Leumi, sell their credit card companies and that new competitors be set up to compete against banks in the credit markets.

=== Competition in the food market ===
On March 19, 2014, the Knesset approved, with no objections, another law supported and campaigned for by TheMarker: a law for the promotion of competition in the food market. The law aims to increase competition by limiting the market influence of major chains and suppliers and by affording smaller suppliers with bigger and more prominent shelf space.
