= Leonidas Platanias =

American oncologist

- Born: Athens, Greece

Academic background
- Education: MD, PhD, School of Medicine, University of Patras

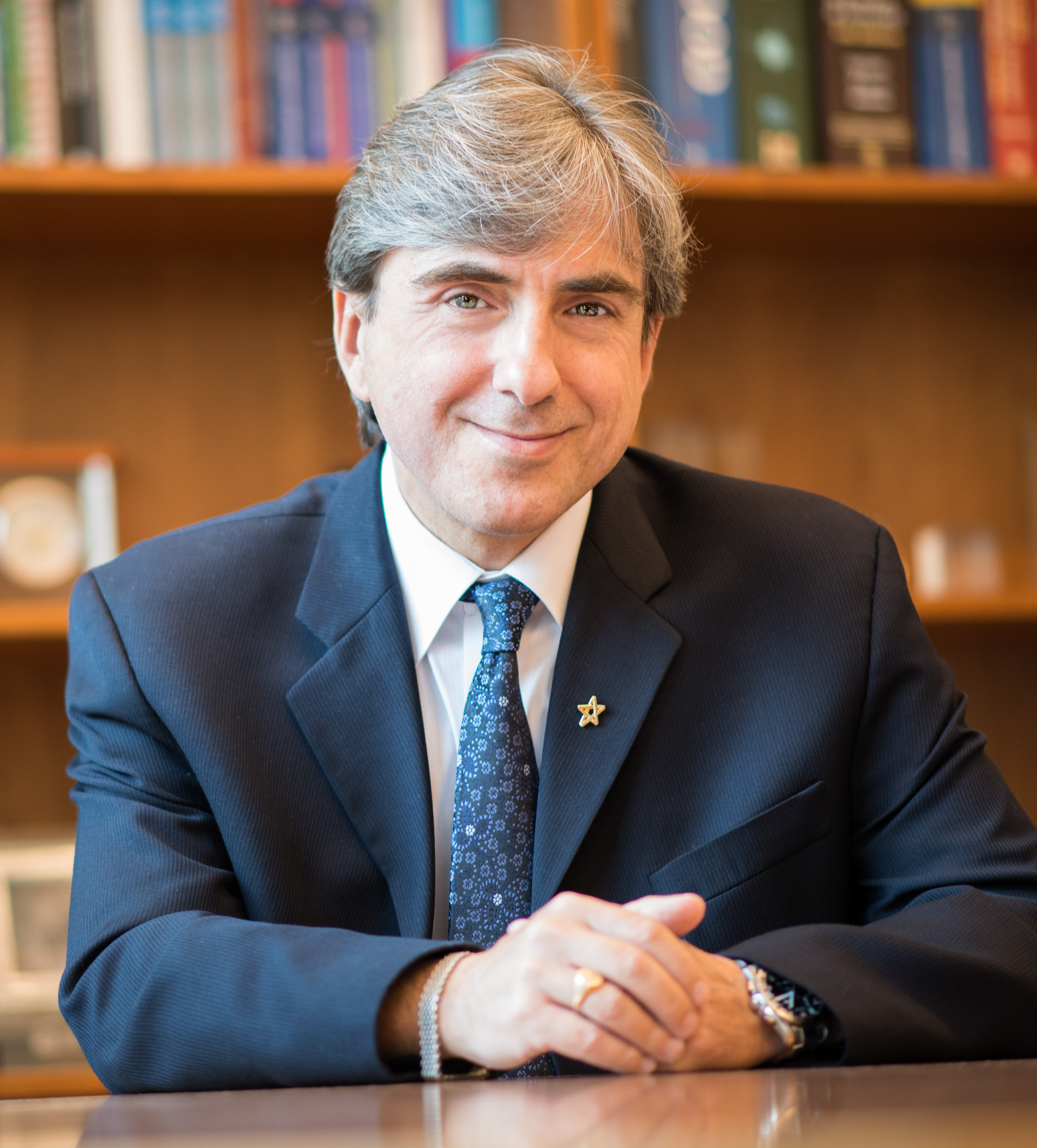
Leonidas Platanias, MD, PhD

Leonidas C. Platanias is a Greek-American oncologist. He is the Director of the Robert H. Lurie Comprehensive Cancer Center of Northwestern University and the Jesse, Sara, Andrew, Abigail, Benjamin, and Elizabeth Lurie Professor of Oncology in the Departments of Medicine and Biochemistry and Molecular Genetics.

== Early life and education ==
Born and raised in Athens, Greece, Platanias earned his medical degree and PhD from the School of Medicine, University of Patras. While completing his degrees, Platanias' father was diagnosed with leukemia which resulted in him pursuing a career in oncology. Following this, he completed a residency in internal medicine at the State University of New York, Downstate Medical Center, and a fellowship in hematology-oncology at the University of Chicago Hospitals.

== Career ==
Upon completing his fellowships and residency, Platanias established his own laboratory working on cytokine signaling pathways in malignant cells in 1992 at Loyola University Chicago. Following this, he accepted an associate professor position at the University of Illinois Chicago (UIC) where he was eventually promoted to the rank of Professor and Chief of the Division of Hematology-Oncology. He eventually left UIC to become the deputy director of the Robert H. Lurie Comprehensive Cancer Center of Northwestern University in 2002. While serving as the Jesse, Sara, Andrew, Abigail, Benjamin, and Elizabeth Lurie Professor of Oncology, Platanias served as president of the International Cytokine & Interferon Society from 2008 to 2009.

During his tenure at Northwestern, Platanias continued his molecular biology and biochemistry research focused on signaling pathways in cancer cells. In 2013, his research team showed an ability to block the growth of primitive disease cells in acute myeloid leukemia while also enhancing the effects of chemotherapy. His laboratory also defined kinase elements as targets for the development of therapeutic approaches in myeloid leukemias. As a result of his research success, Platanias received the 2013 Seymour & Vivian Milstein Award for Excellence in Interferon and Cytokine Research from the International Cytokine and Interferon Society. Following this, he was appointed the Interim Director of the Robert H. Lurie Comprehensive Cancer Center.

While serving as director of the Robert H. Lurie Comprehensive Cancer Center, Platanias received the 2019 Academy of Achievement in Medicine Award from the American Hellenic Educational Progressive Association. He also helped discover a never-before-seen counterpart called cTORC to explain why cancer therapies targeting only mTORC have been unsuccessful.
