= Chadi Nabhan =

American oncologist and author

Chadi Nabhan is a Syrian-American hematologist and medical oncologist known for his work in lymphoma and health care strategy. He has held senior roles in both academic medicine and the health care industry, including serving as medical director of the cancer clinics at the University of Chicago Medicine and as Chairman of the Precision Oncology Alliance at Caris Life Sciences. Nabhan was a key expert witness in the high-profile Roundup (glyphosate) cancer trials against Monsanto, experiences he detailed in his 2023 book Toxic Exposure. He is also recognized for advocating the use of real-world evidence in oncology and for engaging the public through books, opinion pieces, and medical podcasts on cancer care. In October 2026, Nabhan was named the incoming chief medical officer of Foundation Medicine, effective November 16, 2026.

== Early life and education ==
Nabhan earned his medical degree from the University of Damascus in Syria in 1991. He subsequently moved to the United States for postgraduate training, completing an internal medicine residency at Loyola University Chicago and a fellowship in hematology and oncology at Northwestern University's Robert H. Lurie Comprehensive Cancer Center. In addition to his medical training, he obtained an MBA in Healthcare Management from Loyola University Chicago's Quinlan School of Business. Nabhan is board-certified in internal medicine, hematology, and medical oncology.

== Medical career ==
Nabhan served as an associate professor of medicine and medical director of the outpatient cancer clinics at the University of Chicago Medicine, where he helped lead efforts toward the cancer center's 2015 Quality Oncology Practice Initiative (QOPI) certification. He subsequently held executive leadership positions, including Chief Medical Officer at Cardinal Health Specialty Solutions and Aptitude Health.

In 2020, he became Chairman of the Precision Oncology Alliance at Caris Life Sciences, leading initiatives in molecular testing, clinical research, and precision oncology. He also held an adjunct professorship at the University of South Carolina. In 2024, he joined Ryght as Chief Medical Officer and Head of Strategy, focusing on artificial intelligence applications in clinical research.

In October 2026, Foundation Medicine announced his appointment as Chief Medical Officer, effective November 16, 2026, overseeing medical affairs and clinical development.

== Research and academic contributions ==
Nabhan has authored or co-authored over 400 peer-reviewed articles, abstracts, and book chapters, primarily focusing on lymphoid malignancies, precision oncology, and real-world evidence in cancer care. His articles have been published in prestigious jourmals such as Journal of Clinical Oncology, Blood, JAMA, JAMA-Oncology, Annals of Oncology, amongst others.

== Books ==
Nabhan is the author of several books on cancer and medicine, including Toxic Exposure: The True Story Behind the Monsanto Trials and the Search for Justice (Johns Hopkins University Press, 2023), which examines the Roundup cancer litigation and his experience as an expert witness. His subsequent nonfiction books include The Cancer Journey: Understanding Diagnosis, Treatment, Recovery, and Prevention (Johns Hopkins University Press, 2024) and AI and Cancer Care (2026) also published by Johns hopkins University Press. His debut fiction novel, Compromised, is scheduled for publication by Koehler Books in February 2027. Nabhan has also ventured into fiction, with his debut medical fiction novel scheduled for release on February of 2027.

== Media and public engagement ==
Beyond academic publishing, Nabhan regularly engages professional and public audiences through commentary, speaking engagements, and podcasts. His articles in STAT (2018) and Medscape (2019) addressed barriers to precision oncology and the importance of real-world evidence in cancer care. He launched Outspoken Oncology in 2019 and later hosted the award-winning Healthcare Unfiltered and Healthcare Unfiltered Express, featuring discussions with experts on cancer research, cancer therapies, healthcare policy, innovation, and patient advocacy. His work focuses on making complex medical topics accessible and fostering candid conversations about healthcare.

== Selected publications ==
1. Shanafelt TD, Rabe KG, Kay NE, et al. “Chronic lymphocytic leukemia: a clinical review.” JAMA. 2014. PubMed: https://pubmed.ncbi.nlm.nih.gov/25461996/. [11] Notable because: a peer-reviewed CLL clinical review in a high‑impact general medical journal. [11]
2. Nabhan C, Rosen ST. “Predicting Prognosis in Chronic Lymphocytic Leukemia in the Contemporary Era.” JAMA Oncology. 2015. PubMed: https://pubmed.ncbi.nlm.nih.gov/26181643/. [12] Notable because: synthesizes contemporary prognostic approaches in CLL in a leading oncology journal. [12]
3. Mato AR, Nabhan C, Thompson MC, et al. “Outcomes of CLL patients treated with sequential kinase inhibitor therapy: a real world experience.” Blood. 2016. PubMed: https://pubmed.ncbi.nlm.nih.gov/27601462/. [13] Notable because: reports multicenter real‑world outcomes of sequential targeted therapy in CLL. [13]
4. Mato AR, Thompson M, Allan JN, et al. “Optimal sequencing of ibrutinib, idelalisib, and venetoclax in chronic lymphocytic leukemia: results from a multicenter study of 683 patients.” Annals of Oncology. 2017. PubMed: https://pubmed.ncbi.nlm.nih.gov/28453705/. [14] Notable because: large multicenter dataset addressing sequencing of cornerstone CLL therapies. [14]
5. Burger JA, Landau DA, Taylor‑Weiner A, et al. “Clonal evolution underlying leukemia progression and Richter transformation in patients with ibrutinib‑relapsed CLL.” Blood Advances. 2017. PubMed: https://pubmed.ncbi.nlm.nih.gov/29296715/. [15] Notable because: connects relapse to clonal evolution and Richter transformation in the targeted‑therapy era. [15]
6. Vargas‑Bustamante A, Ortega A, Nabhan C. “Value‑Based Calculators in Cancer: Current State and Challenges.” Journal of Oncology Practice. 2017. PubMed: https://pubmed.ncbi.nlm.nih.gov/28617618/. [16] Notable because: addresses oncology value frameworks and implementation challenges in practice. [16]
7. Nabhan C, Parsad S, Mato AR. “Behavioral Economics and the Future of Biosimilars.” JNCCN. 2017. PubMed: https://pubmed.ncbi.nlm.nih.gov/29223980/. [17] Notable because: applies behavioral economics to biosimilar uptake in oncology care. [17]
8. Nabhan C, Zmiekowski M, Pavia D. “Biosimilars in Oncology in the United States: A Review.” JAMA Oncology. 2018. PubMed: https://pubmed.ncbi.nlm.nih.gov/28727871/. [18] Notable because: reviews U.S. oncology biosimilar landscape in a major peer-reviewed journal. [18]
9. Mato AR, Nabhan C, Thompson MC, et al. “Toxicities and outcomes of 616 ibrutinib‑treated patients in the United States: a real‑world analysis.” Haematologica. 2018. PubMed: https://pubmed.ncbi.nlm.nih.gov/29419429/. [19] Notable because: large U.S. cohort (n=616) examining real‑world safety and outcomes. [19]
10. Mato AR, Nabhan C, Thompson MC, et al. “Real‑world outcomes and management strategies for venetoclax‑treated chronic lymphocytic leukemia patients in the United States.” Haematologica. 2018. PubMed: https://pubmed.ncbi.nlm.nih.gov/29880613/. [20] Notable because: multicenter real‑world outcomes work focused on venetoclax era practice. [20]
