= Eytan Avriel =

Israeli journalist

Eytan Avriel (Hebrew: איתן אבריאל; born December 11, 1960) is an Israeli journalist and economic commentator, he is a founder of TheMarker and serves as the current Editor-in-Chief of TheMarker magazine.

== Biography ==
Avriel has a BSc in Biology and Business Administration from the Hebrew University of Jerusalem (1988) and an MBA from the same institution (2006), specializing in Financial engineering. He is also an alumnus of the Singularity University at Silicon Valley.

Avriel served in the Israeli Navy, in Shayetet 13 and the unit for underwater tasks. He is married, has a daughter and a son and lives in Hod Hasharon, Israel.

Avriel writes and speaks extensively on Israel's economy, business and society, including crony capitalism and institutional preference toward media owners, the energy sector, political economy, the housing price bubble, macroeconomic policy, digital life, Israel's "Start-up Nation", and Cybercrime. Avriel is also quoted by non-Israeli outlets.

== Journalism career ==
Avriel's first work in financial journalism was as the economic correspondent for Haaretz at the Israeli Ministry of Finance and at the Bank of Israel. Avriel then moved to Reuters where he founded the business desk at Reuters Israel and launched new media products. Some of these include a Hebrew language business news services, and a money market exchanges and mobile financial data platform. During the 90s Avriel worked as an investment manager of mutual funds, and as an investment banker.

In 1999 Avriel founded the economic news platform TheMarker along with Guy Rolnik and Ido Pollak. As part of this venture he also founded a new daily newspaper (2005), a monthly economic magazine (2001), TheMarker cafe social network and an internet video channel. Avriel served as the founding editor of TheMarker's website.

He is a columnist writing on social and political economics, crony capitalism, the relations of money and power, investments, foreign currency, banking, the internet, and the impact of new technologies on the society and the economy. Avriel launched a number of known news products such as the "500 most wealthy Israelis" and "100 most influential Israelis" lists. In 2012, Avriel was nominated Editor-in-Chief of TheMarker's magazine.

In 2005 Avriel was a member of an Israeli Securities Authority committee to set an ethics code for the distribution of financial information over the internet.

In 2012 Avriel published a column regarding the status of the Ma'ariv newspaper. In response Ma'ariv published an edition of their paper with four columns on the front page responding to Avriel's column. The entire ordeal was covered by The Jerusalem Post.

Avriel has a recurring position on London et Kirshenbaum, a widely watched Israeli talk show. He also appears as a commentator on the Israeli Army Radio, Reshet B, and other TV and radio outlets. He has lectured the Interdisciplinary Center Herzliya and Tel Aviv University.

== See also ==
- Economy of Israel
- Israeli journalism
