= Daniel Doron =

Israeli writer and free-market advocate (1929–2022)

- דניאל דורון
- Born: Daniel Halperin; 1929
- Died: February 28, 2022
- Education: Hebrew University of Jerusalem; University of Chicago (AM)
- Occupations: Writer; Translator; Free-market advocate
- Organization: Israel Center for Social and Economic Progress
- Known for: Campaigning against economic concentration in Israel

Daniel Doron (Hebrew: דניאל דורון; born Daniel Halperin; 1929 – 28 February 2022) was an Israeli writer, translator and free-market advocate. He founded the Israel Center for Social and Economic Progress (ICSEP) in the mid-1980s and directed it without a salary.

He worked with Avraham Yavin in translating The Catcher in the Rye and A Portrait of the Artist as a Young Man into Hebrew. From about 1959 he represented the painter Shalom Moskovitz, known as Shalom of Safed, and lived on the proceeds of that arrangement. He took a master's degree at the University of Chicago in 1963, stayed on in the United States and raised money there for Yigael Yadin's Democratic Movement for Change.

Through ICSEP he campaigned for three decades against concentration, monopoly and cartels in the Israeli economy. He sat on an advisory committee that reported to Benjamin Netanyahu on the banks in 1997 and wrote for The Wall Street Journal and The Jerusalem Post. Asked in 1991 what he was, he answered that his field was literature.

== Early life and education ==
Doron was born Daniel Halperin in 1929 and grew up in Tel Aviv, in a religious and well-off family that lost its money during the Second World War. He was a descendant of Zerah Barnett, one of the founders of Petah Tikva. His mother died when he was fourteen. After finishing at the Gymnasia Moriah he was sent to relatives in the United States, where he began to study medicine.

In 1948 he enlisted in the Haganah in the United States and sailed for Israel aboard the SS Marine Carp. When the ship called at Beirut after Israel declared independence, Lebanese troops removed sixty-nine Jewish male passengers, Doron among them, and interned them in a disused French army camp at Baalbek. They were released on 30 June 1948, about six weeks later. Doron reached Israel and served in the air force.

He then read economics at the Hebrew University of Jerusalem, where he was taught by Don Patinkin.

== Early career ==
Doron worked as a press and public relations officer of Israel's government tourism company and took part in the committee for the state's tenth-anniversary celebrations.

In December 1957 the Prime Minister's Office seconded him to the United States embassy in Tel Aviv, where he served as the Israeli adviser to Howard Bacus, the American ambassador's special assistant for a cultural program funded by the proceeds of American book sales in Israel. The two men were to survey forty-two Israeli institutions before grants voted by Congress were distributed to them.

He wrote literary criticism for Haaretz in the mid-1950s, including a review of Max Brod's biography of Franz Kafka and an essay on Rudyard Kipling's Kim, and with the translator Avraham Yavin he produced the Hebrew versions of J. D. Salinger's The Catcher in the Rye and James Joyce's A Portrait of the Artist as a Young Man, both published by Am Oved.

During the War of Attrition Teddy Kollek brought him into the Government Press Office, where he escorted distinguished visitors to David Ben-Gurion at Sde Boker.

== Shalom of Safed ==
In the 1950s, Doron's wife visited the Safed watchmaker and naïve painter Shalom Moskovitz, known as Shalom of Safed. She had heard of the elderly man who had taken up a brush and took several pictures away with her. (Note: Maariv credited her with "discovering" the painter. Reporting the 1967 exhibition, Kol Ha'am and LaMerhav instead credited the discovery to the painter Yosl Bergner. All three put the word in quotation marks.) About the end of 1959 Moskovitz signed an agreement giving the Doron family the sole right to his pictures for three years, and by 1961 his work was being shown in New York at the Carlebach Gallery under the auspices of the America-Israel Cultural Foundation.

When the Israel Museum in Jerusalem mounted the first comprehensive exhibition of Moskovitz's work in May 1967, fifty of the paintings shown were lent by Doron. The show was opened by the acting mayor of Safed.

Doron became the painter's representative and promoted him at length, mounting dozens of exhibitions, producing two documentary films about him for American television and publishing catalogues and albums. Bloomingdale's sold silk scarves printed with the paintings and signed by both men.

The promotion cost so much that Doron sold his house in Tel Aviv to continue it. He invested the proceeds of the arrangement and was still living on them thirty years later, telling an interviewer that it had been more a matter of luck than of brains.

A film about the painter, Shalom of Safed, is credited jointly to Doron and Arnold Eagle and was released by Ergo Media. Doron also wrote the introduction to Images from the Bible, a 1980 collection pairing Moskovitz's paintings with a text by Elie Wiesel.

== United States and political activity ==
Doron took a master's degree at the Committee on Social Thought at the University of Chicago in June 1963, with a thesis on passion, sentiment and reason in the work of William Shakespeare. He remained in Chicago afterwards. (Note: The published accounts of why he went do not agree. Maariv reported in 1977 that he had left Israel in 1963 to write a doctorate on Shakespeare. The 1991 Hadashot profile places the move to Chicago after the War of Attrition and gives the subject as the development of the human species.) Eamonn Butler of the Adam Smith Institute, a friend, wrote that his thinking was shaped by his time on the Committee and by Friedrich Hayek and Milton Friedman, who taught there, and that he stayed close to Friedman in particular, all three of them being members of the Mont Pelerin Society. A 1991 profile in Hadashot described Friedman as his guru.

Hearing that Yigael Yadin's Democratic Movement for Change was being formed, Doron made contact from the United States and raised money for it there. He registered himself as a foreign agent with the United States Department of Justice in Washington in order to do so. Afterwards, he worked for it in Israel as well.

Early in 1977 he was in Israel, where he arranged a dialogue between the American Jewish Committee and a group of Israeli economists.

Two things convinced him that something was fundamentally wrong and needed more of his attention. First, Israeli businessmen held back money from the movement for fear of reprisal by the establishment and second the failure of his brother's business after which his brother left the country. He thus approached economic work.

== Israel Center for Social and Economic Progress ==
Doron returned to Israel and founded the Israel Center for Social and Economic Progress, which promoted free-market ideas. (Note: Israeli reporting dates the founding to 1984. Hadashot described the center as a new body in September 1984, and TheMarker later said Doron founded it in that year. Several English-language accounts give 1983.) He ran it as his only occupation and took no salary. Its annual budget of about $300,000 came from an American friends association.

It operated weekend conferences for what Doron called the layer of policy-shapers and decision-makers, meaning journalists, politicians, civil servants, judges and academics. He obtained the blessing of President Chaim Herzog and brought the supreme court justice Aharon Barak to a joint event with the institute for judicial training. Interviewed in 1991, Doron said the only return he asked of participants was that they listen.

The center attracted notice abroad early. Writing in The New York Times in August 1984, William Safire described it as nonpartisan and reported that American economists including Herbert Stein were informally discussing ideas with it.

In 1997 Doron sat on an independent economic advisory committee that reported to Benjamin Netanyahu, then prime minister, on Israeli banks. Writing in the Wall Street Journal Europe, Robert L. Pollock gave Doron's account that three banks controlled about 80 per cent of Israeli bank assets and reported the committee's view that they should first be separated from the pension, provident and mutual funds and then be made to sell their industrial holdings. Globes in 1999 called him the prime minister's adviser and quoted him saying that the head of a large bank could once telephone Yitzhak Rabin and get what he wanted, and that this was no longer the case.

In June 2003 Doron was present in Jerusalem when Martin Wolf of the Financial Times interviewed Netanyahu, by then finance minister, and the published transcript shows Doron putting questions of his own. He later sat on the advisory committee to the finance minister Yuval Steinitz, and he was among the founding team of the Herzliya Conference.

Covering the 2011 social protests on the front page of The New York Times, Ethan Bronner quoted Doron at length. Doron argued that the way failing state assets had been privatized in the 1980s and 1990s produced a dangerous consolidation, as it had in the former Soviet Union, and that it had amounted to "basically selling assets to cronies". "Today", he said, "the whole Israeli economy is built on rapacious elites fleecing consumers."

The center also drew criticism. In 1991 it paid part of the cost of a trip to London for nine members of the Knesset finance committee, the British government meeting two thirds of the bill, a year after it had flown a dozen Israeli journalists to the United States. Reporting the episode, Hadashot noted a persistent rumour that Doron worked for the CIA, which he denied and traced to a joke of his own that a broadcaster had quoted straight.

Writing in TheMarker in December 2013, its founding editor Guy Rolnik called Doron "notably not an economist" but a man who had worked obsessively on concentration, monopoly and cartels for decades, "when most of the regulators, and the writer of these lines too, were still at primary or secondary school". Rolnik credited him with being among the few who could explain that a campaign against concentration was not directed against business but against monopolies, and added that the economic left disliked Doron's views on the free market and on limiting government but "would be surprised to discover that where tycoons and bankers are concerned, Doron is the most devoted and radical fighter".

At a gathering of about 500 people for Doron's eightieth birthday at the Bible Lands Museum in December 2009, the Bank of Israel governor Stanley Fischer said that he did not agree with everything Doron said "but I have great appreciation for what he has done. Daniel is very consistent in his fight for a free economy, contrary to the position that was dominant in Israel."

== Writing ==
Doron published opinion pieces in The Wall Street Journal in 2011 and 2012, returning to monopoly, cartels, cronyism and the cost of living, and he was writing for The Jerusalem Post in 2010. In January 2007 the Association for the Public's Right to Know gave him a $5,000 prize, funded by the New York investment banker Paul Singer, for what it called his consistent and fearless contribution to fair economic journalism in Israel.

His last book, Tmol ve-Kishalon ("Yesterday and Failure"), appeared from the Yedioth Ahronoth imprint Mishkal in 2022. Its subtitle asks how the founders of the state created a system that threatens Israeli lives, and it traces the country's cost of living to the statist convictions of Ben-Gurion and the Mapai establishment, with the Histadrut, the Jewish Agency and the kibbutzim as its other targets. Doron died on 28 February 2022, at the age of 92, a few months after the Heritage Foundation gave him its inaugural Steven M. Sass Economic Freedom Award.
