= Robert H. Lurie =

American philanthropist and businessman

Robert H. Lurie was an American philanthropist and businessman who was a founder of the Ann and Robert H. Lurie Foundation, which contributed to the Robert H. Lurie Comprehensive Cancer Center and Lurie Children's Hospital. With his business partner Sam Zell, he was a part-owner of the White Sox and the Bulls. He died of cancer on June 20, 1990, having made US$390 million.
