= Shalom Moskovitz =

Israeli painter (c. 1887 – 1980)

Shalom Moskovitz שלום מושקוביץ'
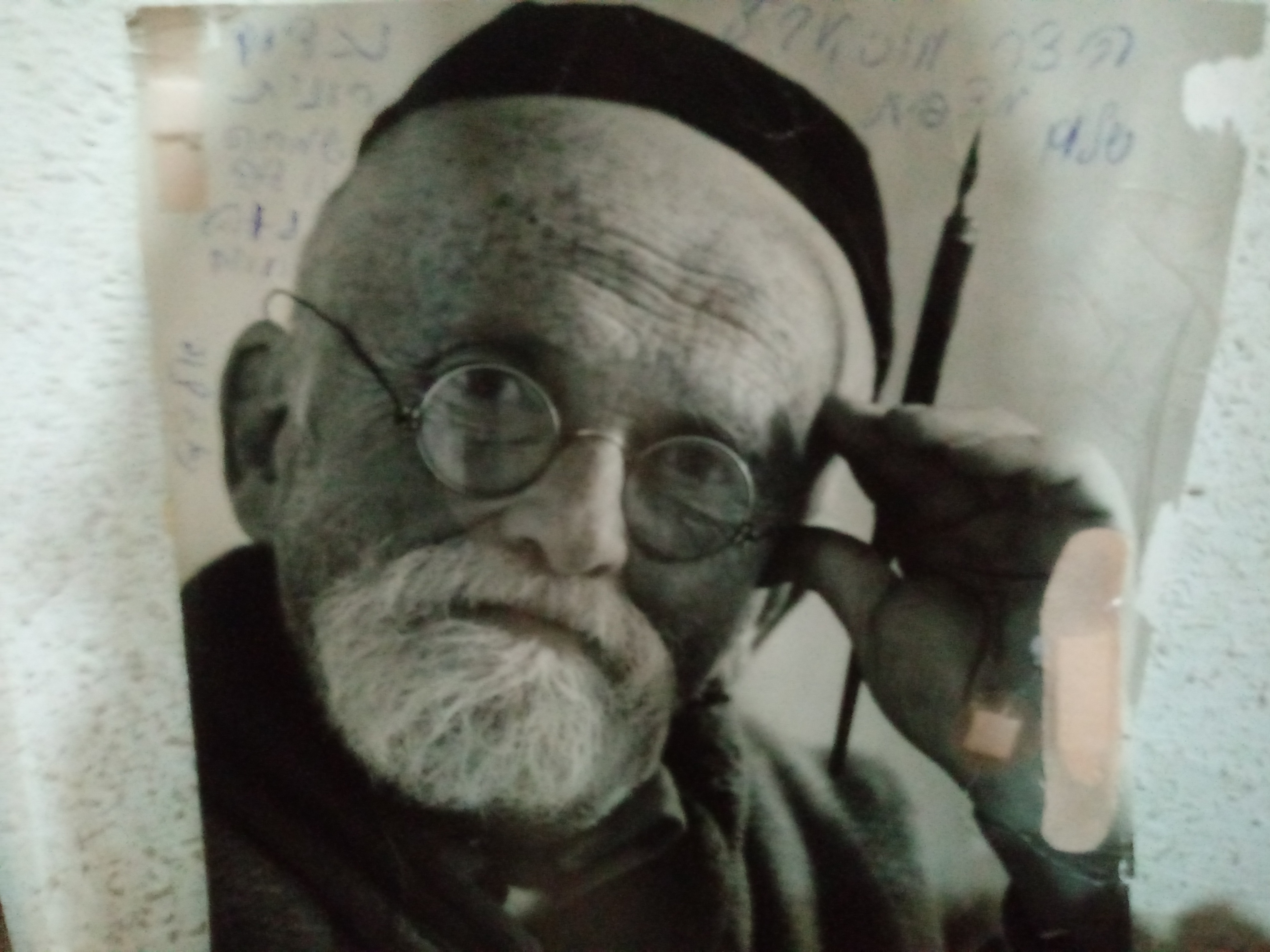
- Born: c. 1887; Safed, Ottoman Empire
- Died: 1980; Safed, Israel
- Burial place: Safed Old Jewish Cemetery

Shalom Moskovitz (also spelled Sholem Moscovitz, Hebrew: 'שלום מושקוביץ;) c. 1887 – 1980) was a Hasidic Jewish painter in Safed, Israel. Moskovitz, known as artist Shalom of Safed, labored as a watchmaker for most of his life before first beginning to paint at the age 55.

His art primarily featured biblical themes and often contained a proverb or sentence from scripture. His paintings are considered significant to Israeli art history.

== Biography ==
Shalom Moskovitz was born in Safed, c 1887. He was Hasidic and influenced by mystical tradition of the Cabbala that like Moskovitz also had its home in Safed.

He earned a living as a watchmaker and was commonly referred to by that name, "Zeigermacher", in Yiddish. During the 1948 Palestine war his workshop was destroyed. This forced him to try earning a living from making toys from plywood.

In the 1950s, painter Yosl Bergner chose to reside in Safed. Bergner encountered wood toys and impressed with the craftsmanship, inquired as to their creator. He was introduced to Moskovitz and encouraged the watchmaker to try painting; even supplying him with painting supplies. Thus began, Shalom Moskovitz second career as an artist.

While Moskovitz's profession shifted to painting, his surrounding remained constant. He continued to live and paint in the city of Safed until his death there in 1980.

== Artistic career ==
Moskovitz was a naïve artist. He painted in the primitive style, expressing biblical themes. He also designed stained-glass windows and was an accomplished practitioner of microcalligraphy.

His art has been featured at the Stedelijk Museum in Amsterdam and the Kunsthaus Zürich. The Israel Museum in Jerusalem mounted the first comprehensive exhibition of his work in May 1967. Noah's Ark (1965), synthetic polymer paint on paper, is in the collection of the Museum of Modern Art in New York City. An exhibition of his work was held at the Jewish Museum of New York in 1980.

In late 1959 Moskovitz signed an agreement giving the family of Daniel Doron the sole right to his pictures for three years, and by 1961 his work was being shown in New York at the Carlebach Gallery under the auspices of the America-Israel Cultural Foundation. His work was shown in dozens of exhibitions, with catalogues, albums, two documentary films made for American television, and silk scarves printed with his paintings and signed by both men, sold at Bloomingdale's.

Also in 1980, Elie Wiesel wrote a book with Moskovitz's art titled "Images from the Bible: the paintings of Shalom of Safed, the words of Elie Wiesel (with Shalom of Safed).

A film about him, Shalom of Safed, credited jointly to Doron and Arnold Eagle, was issued by Ergo Media about 1988.
