= Santa Fe Snyder =

Santa Fe Snyder Corporation was an independent oil and gas exploration and production company headquartered in Houston, Texas. The company was formed by the 1999 merger of Houston-based Santa Fe Energy Resources and Fort Worth-based Snyder Oil Corporation. Santa Fe Snyder merged with Devon Energy in August 2000. Devon Energy Corp., Oklahoma City, has agreed to acquire Santa Fe Snyder Corp., Houston, for about $3.35 billion in stock and assumed debt, in a deal creating one of the top five US independent oil and gas companies. Devon Chairman Larry Nichols says the combined company will be stronger to compete than either partner would be independently. Santa Fe Snyder was a publicly held company traded on the New York Stock Exchange under the ticker symbol SFS.

Devon Energy Corporation, based in Oklahoma City, has entered into an agreement to purchase Houston-based Santa Fe Snyder Corporation for approximately $3.35 billion in a stock and assumed debt deal. The acquisition will establish the combined company as one of the top five independent oil and gas companies in the US, with Devon Energy Corporation retaining its name and remaining headquartered in Oklahoma City.

Under the terms of the deal, each Santa Fe Snyder common share will be exchanged for 0.22 shares of Devon common stock. This will result in Devon shareholders owning approximately 68% of the combined company, with Santa Fe Snyder shareholders owning the remaining 32%. The agreement includes taking on around $1 billion of debt and liabilities.

The merged entity will hold total proved reserves of around 1.1 billion boe, and is expected to be "stronger and better positioned to compete together than either would be independently," according to Larry Nichols, the current CEO of Devon Energy Corporation. The combined company's larger platform is anticipated to enhance both its drilling and acquisition strategies.

Although the companies expect to achieve cost savings of between $30-35 million per year, it is unclear if these will involve job cuts. The two firms have significant property overlap in core operating regions, such as the Rocky Mountains, the Gulf of Mexico, and the Permian basin.

The majority of the combined company's reserves will be located in North America, with a 58% weighting towards natural gas. Additionally, the company will hold substantial international reserves, including interests in Southeast Asia, South America, and Azerbaijan.

The boards of both companies have approved the merger, which is set to be finalized in the third quarter, subject to regulatory and shareholder approval. Devon's current CEO, Larry Nichols, will serve as president and CEO of the combined company, while James L. Payne, Santa Fe Snyder's CEO, will serve as vice-chairman. Devon's current chairman, James L. Pate, will be board chairman.

== History ==
On January 13, 1999, Snyder Oil Corporation and Santa Fe Energy Resources announced their intention to merge. The merger was completed on May 5, 1999.

Santa Fe Snyder was engaged in the exploration, development, acquisition and production of crude oil and natural gas in the U.S. and certain international areas. Its core U.S. areas were the Gulf of Mexico, the Permian Basin and the Rocky Mountains and its core international areas were Southeast Asia and South America. The company also had oil production and conducted some exploration operations, in West Africa.

As of December 31, 1999, Santa Fe Snyder reported annual revenue of $510.3 million, net proved reserves of 386.3 million barrels of oil equivalents, and 1,408 employees.

== Merger with Devon Energy ==
On May 26, 2000, Santa Fe Snyder and Devon Energy announced their intention to merge. The merger was completed three months later, making Devon Energy one of the top-five U.S.-based independent oil and gas producers in terms of market capitalization, total proved reserves and annual production.
