= Israel Center for Social and Economic Progress =

Israeli pro-market public policy thinktank

The Israel Center for Social and Economic Progress is an independent pro-market public policy thinktank founded in 1983 by Daniel Doron to promote basic structural reform in Israel's economy. Its British Friends include members of the Jewish-British community such as Gerald Ronson and Barry Townsley. The center has also received funding from Sam Zell.

ICSEP was credited by then finance minister Binyamin Netanyahu as having provided “truly invaluable assistance" in helping bring about the country's 2005 capital market reform bill and additional tax reform.
