= Guy Rolnik =

Israeli journalist and businessman

Guy rolnik
- גיא רולניק
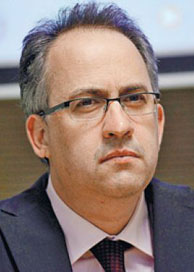
- Born: September 2, 1968 (age 58)
- Citizenship: Israeli

Guy Rolnik (Hebrew: גיא רולניק; born September 2, 1968) is an Israeli journalist, executive, entrepreneur, and a clinical professor at the University of Chicago. He founded Israeli media organization TheMarker and is a deputy Publisher of the Haaretz daily newspaper.

Rolnik is an influential business and economics journalist in Israel, promoting open, competitive markets with strong social safety net and is often considered a leader in the fight against corruption.

In 2013 Rolnik was awarded the Sokolov Award for Lifetime Achievement for founding TheMarker, changing public discourse and influencing the government and legislators to undertake significant changes in the structure of the Israeli economy.

Rolnik and TheMarker led an informative campaign to introduce competition in the mobile telephony market, that was dominated by 3 companies. As a result, prices dropped by 50% to 90% when competition was enforced without any material loss of employment in the labor market.

Rolnik is a Clinical Associate Professor at the University of Chicago Booth School of Business. He teaches courses on economic policy, media and regulation in Chicago, Tel Aviv University and the Reichman University.

== Biography ==
=== Education ===
Rolnik has a BA degree in economics from Tel Aviv University (July 1996) and an MBA from the Tel Aviv and Northwestern University's Kellogg-Recanati program (July 1998). Rolnik attended Harvard University's Advanced Management Program (AMP; Nov 2003) and its Advanced Leadership Initiative (2014).

=== Career ===
Rolnik became a reporter in the Israeli army at the age of 18, later the economic reporter and later editor for the army radio station. Immediately after his military service he joined Haa'aretz, and at the age of 24 became the editor and head of the financial markets section. 4 years later he joined the editorial board of the newspaper.

In 1999 Rolnik founded and led financial news company TheMarker. 6 years later he sold his shares to Ha'aretz and became its deputy publisher. He led the editorial and business operations of TheMarker for 13 years as Editor-in-Chief.

In December 2013 Rolnik won the Israeli journalism Sokolov Prize for founding TheMarker, changing Israeli Media, changing public discourse in Israel and influencing the government and legislators to undertake significant changes in the structure of the Israeli economy.

In its decision to grant the prize to Rolnik, the jury wrote:

"Guy Rolnik emphasized well and tirelessly Israel’s problematic economic structure, in which capital is concentrated in a small number of business entities that are connected to those who have political and governmental power. Guy Rolnik exposed the serious defects in this structure to correct them to secure a healthier, more equitable and more just economic system.

"In the columns, essays and analyses, Rolnik made complex economic issues clearer and simpler to the benefit of a vast readership. He initiated many investigative stories into economic and social issues and published articles that exposed the damages that strong and well-connected entities brought upon weaker groups from the socio-economic periphery. His writings influenced his readers – but also lawmakers, and encouraged many debates in the Israeli parliament. Haaretz newspaper and Guy Rolnik, the Editor-in-Chief of TheMarker, did not bow down to the threats made by powerful businesspeople and to ad boycotts and were relentless in their work. By this they demonstrated the important role of a business press that does not limit itself to reporting and analyzing.

"In his writing and work as the Editor-in-Chief of TheMarker, Rolnik proved that brave journalism, based on independent thinking and free of interests, can bring about changes in society and the economy. In doing so he strengthened the status and influence of business journalism and highlighted the potential it has to promote reform and processes that are beneficial to the Israeli economy. As the Editor-in-Chief, Rolnik was successful in bequeathing these values also to the team of journalists that worked alongside him".

In a recommendation letter to the prize jury, Israeli media personality Yaron London wrote:

"Rolnik is among the best commentators on economic affairs in the Israeli press, if not the best. He has extensive knowledge of social and economic affairs and clear opinions on issues of corporate governance and the need to diversify control over the Israeli economy. His writing, whose outlook he taught to the editors and writers of TheMarker, the newspaper he founded, had unprecedented influence over sentiment among the broad public and the establishment. For the first time in the history of the Israeli financial press, one newspaper headed by one person had enormous effect on economic policy and, more precisely, on the sentiment it takes to cause change.”

Jan 2014 – Fellow at the advanced leadership Initiative, Harvard.

== Activities ==
Rolnik supports open and competitive markets and points out to failures in the private and public of the Israeli economy. He led a series of informative journalistic campaigns, mainly regarding structural reforms, fostering of competition and reducing concentration in the business and capital sectors.

Beginning in 2005, Rolnik and his team set out on an informative campaign that included hundreds of columns, stories and features regarding the perils of the concentration of economic and political power in few hands in the Israeli economy and the danger is posed to competitiveness, prices, innovation and democracy. Pursuant to this campaign, in October 2010 Prime Minister Benjamin Netanyahu and Bank of Israel's Governor Stanley Fischer set up a committee tasked with formulating recommendations for increasing competitiveness and decreasing concentration in the Israeli business sector. Its final recommendations were published on February 22, 2012.

In 2009 Rolnik initiated a campaign advocating the introduction of competition in the cellular telephony market, which was lacking. Following this campaign, Minister of Communications Moshe Kahlon decided to open the market for competition; Israel's cellular telephone bills soon dropped by 50–90% (for example, while Israeli cellular provider Partner's monthly Average Revenue Per user (ARPU) in 2006-2008 was 161 shekels, by 2015 it fell to 69 shekels, a 57% drop).

In January 2011 Rolnik launched the "Israel 2021 Initiative", aimed at changing the Israeli public discourse, at the time dominated by political and security issues. Rolnik called for more emphasis on economic and social issues and long-term planning. The two-day launch event was attended by 3,000 guests and hosted Prime Minister Netanyahu. There were 175 round table discussions on economic and social issues. According to Channel 2, Israel's main TV channel, TheMarker's ideas inspired and influenced the Israeli social protest that followed in summer of 2011. The 2013 Israeli general election campaigns focused more on economic issues.

In April 2012, Mako, a news website owned by Israeli television broadcaster Keshet, wrote that Guy has "sprouting [...] – and most keenly relevant – pair of fangs in Israeli journalism ... In these times, as it turns out how tycoons exploit us and pyramidal business conglomerates gobble our assets, and how government officials stand by them and not by us, Rolnik and his team are a courageous beacon of light in a media world bent by vested interests and their controlling shareholders. Well before the 2011 social justice protests gained momentum, TheMarker had formulated its principles. When the masses took to the streets, Rolnik could fairly write to his readers, 'I told you so'.”

An independent Israeli watchdog states that “during the first decade following its founding, TheMarker was a lone journalistic voice in a line of battles against the connections between the government and powerful businesspeople and the concentration of economic and political power in the hands of few. Following the 2011 social protests, during which some of Rolnik’s and TheMarker’s gained wide public recognition, some other media outlets began adopting some of the ideas he led. Rolnik’s and TheMarker’s campaigns yielded at least seven major economic reforms: (1) the implementation of the recommendations of the Bejski Commission – ending banks’ control of capital markets (2) the introduction of competition in the cellular market (3) increasing taxes on Israel's natural resources (The Sheshinski Committee) (4) preventing the bailout of tycoons with Israeli taxpayers and savers money following the 2008 financial crisis (5) the creation of Israel's Anti-Concentration Committee (6) the creation of the Strum Committee for the introduction of competition in the banking sector, and (7) exposing the corruption in both the IDB and Bank Hapoalim groups during the reign of the Dankner family, which led to their indictments, convictions and removal from their positions. Rolnik is not identified with any political or party lines. In his commentaries, he points many times to the Northern European model of an open and competitive economy, effective social and inclusive safety nets and high levels of social capital".

In 2014 Rolnik was teaching a course in the Faculty of Management at Tel Aviv University entitled the "Structural Issues in the Israeli Economy."

=== Accomplishments ===
In June 2005 he received the Movement for Quality Government in Israel “Knight of Quality Government” award. The Movement said that it was awarded “in gratitude for a unique contribution in the media for uncovering faults and in the public service, for a struggle against corruption and for the improvement of the quality of public sector. In his commentary, Rolnik raises the level of public criticism on the government's behavior and underscores its importance to the improvement of the quality of government. By doing so he sets an example of quality to his colleagues in the media and to Israeli society”.

In January 2006 Rolnik was the co-winner Advertising Agencies Association Israel's (AAAI) Marketing Person of the Year award. A year and a half later, in July 2007, TheMarker won the Platinum Effie Awards for the most effective advertising or marketing campaign of 2007 in Israel. Both awards followed the re-launch of Haaretz newspaper's business supplement in January 2005 in compact size sheet and rebranded “TheMarker”. Rolnik accepted the reward on TheMarker's behalf.

In January 2008 Rolnik was awarded a "quality of economic journalism" prize by Israel's Society for the Public's Right to Know. In its explanatory notes, the organization wrote that "Rolnik is one of the best business journalists and commentators in Israel today. In his clear and challenging writings, Rolnik demonstrates civilian courage of the first degree and does not refrain even from writing about, and even attacking, influential elements in the Israeli economy".

In December 2012 Rolnik was acknowledged by the Kinneret College for fighting the concentration of economic power and for his continued support of the July 2011 social protests. In its statement, the college said that Rolnik "succeeded in creating an outstanding newspaper within a few years, constantly guiding its readers in the complex local and global economic and social environment and encouraging the adoption of social change".

== Press mentions ==
In May 2004, “The Seventh Eye”, Israel's media critique magazine, which was part of the Israel Democracy Institute interviewed journalists, business people and media experts in Israel. Almost all of them ascertained that Rolnik is Israel's most influential columnist and the best economic journalist in Israel.

A senior executive in the media industry was quoted: “Rolnik is the most influential economics journalist in Israel, I read every word he writes. Unlike other journalists he manages to surprise me time and again because his position is so unpredictable”.

In February 2011 The New Yorker's editor, David Remnick, published a story about Haaretz and Schocken, saying "Under the leadership of a young, hyper-ambitious editor named Guy Rolnik, TheMarker brought a new, more youthful audience to Haaretz — one at least as interested in the high-tech industry as it is in the Palestinian issue — just as the worldwide newspaper crisis hit. TheMarker, which can be bought separately, has helped save the paper. Rolnik has been especially good at publishing investigative pieces on what he calls the 'Israeli oligarchs,' a small group of billionaires and their families who control much of the national economy".

In March 2011 Daniel Doron, the director of the Israel Center for Social and Economic Progress, wrote in The Jerusalem Post: "The strong bond between government and capital that developed here has a third partner, the media. Until recently, when Yisrael Hayom broke the mold, the media were a duopoly owned by the tycoons, and protected them (with the noble exception of TheMarker and its valiant editor Guy Rolnik, who, at great cost, leads the struggle against excess media concentration)".

In October 2011 Israel's Channel 2 aired a program dedicated to the previous Jewish year's main events, the major one being the summer's social protests. The presenter said: “… the hundreds of thousands that took to the streets in the summer strengthened the ideological plight of TheMarker and its Editor-in-Chief, Guy Rolnik, against the concentration of economic power in the hands of few and against the nation's tycoons. Even though it ranks only at number 4 in its readership, in the past months, TheMarker became Israel's most influential newspaper".

In December 2011 Raviv Drucker, anchor of television Channel 10 investigative program "The Source", said he "identifies" with Rolnik's fight against tycoons and added that "Rolnik and TheMarker created, with their own hands", the government-appointed committee that dealt with the concentration of economic power. "It is thanks to them", he said, "that we found out the extent to which our capital and debt markets sometimes resemble a close-knit circle of cronies."

In April 2012 Mako, a news website owned by television broadcaster Keshet, included Rolnik in a list of "Israel's 50 most interesting people". Keshet's journalist, Dror Globerman, wrote: "Even during these tough times for the press in general and Haaretz in particular, it seems that this seasoned editor understands very well which side his bread is buttered on, and it isn't on the side of staying in the good books of advertisers; it's on the side of biting criticism, giving his readers the feeling that there is somebody they can count on. And while about it, he sets an important standard for his colleagues."

In December 2013, “The Seventh Eye” media watchdog wrote: “TheMarker, led by Guy Rolnik, turned economic concentration to a central part of the Israeli public discourse. A rare example, not only in Israel, of a media outlet that succeeds through an aggressive, versatile and creative campaign to significantly influence the public agenda to such an extent that the parliament adopts a bill that will bring about dramatic changes to the structure of the economy”.

In December 2013 Aviv Hurvitz, media critic for Israeli Channel2 website, wrote: “Not every day an Israeli newspaper decides to initiate a long–term campaign knowing that it will take years and its chances of success are slim at best. Not even every year... TheMarker, led by Guy Rolnik, did it – and succeeded"

In January 2014, Professor Steven Davidoff at the University of California, Berkeley's school of law and columnist for The New York Times analyzed the process that influenced Israeli government and lawmakers to formulate and approve the dramatic reform in the economy to break concentration. Davidoff described the role of team of journalists led by Rolnik to initiate the reform and to push it through the political obstacles. He argued that the reform led by Rolnik should offer lessons for United States:

"A number of journalists at the Israeli newspaper Haaretz led the charge, claiming that Israel’s public shareholders often lost out as the tycoons used them to subsidize their collection of businesses. The tycoons could put down little money but control vast swathes of the Israeli economy. These pyramids also used their size to crowd out competitors and take on excessive debt by lending among their companies. The Israeli economy was viewed by some to be uncompetitive because the concentration of businesses arguably drove up prices and decreased competition. In the small Israeli economy, the pyramids were behemoths that some termed too big to fail.

"In October 2010, the Israeli government formed a committee of 10 government regulators known as the concentration committee to examine the issue of the tycoons’ control of the Israeli economy. The committee was advised by Lucian Bebchuk, a Harvard Law professor and occasional contributor to DealBook, who strongly advocated breaking up the more significant pyramids.

Committees are usually where things go to die, but the 2011 protests along with Haaretz's sustained campaign kept the cause going. The concentration committee's report was issued in 2012, and it struck directly at the pyramids, aiming to overhaul the Israeli economy. The committee recommended the breakup of the pyramids in the hope that if they were destroyed, prices would come down in the wake of greater competition, helping the average Israeli and addressing income inequality”.

In March 2015, journalist and media critic Michael Massing highlighted the work done by TheMarker and Rolnik in an essay “How to fix American Journalism” that appeared in the special issue of The Nation magazine for its 150 years celebration. According to Massing, the unique campaign that waged Rolnik as Editor-in-Chief of TheMarker is the model for fixing American Journalism: "TheMarker, an Israeli financial newspaper distributed as a supplement to Haaretz, waged an unflagging campaign beginning in the mid-2000s against the extraordinary concentration of economic power in Israel and the dangers that this development posed to Israeli society and democracy. Led by its founding editor, Guy Rolnik, the paper ran periodic stories and columns that paid special attention to the “Israeli oligarchs,” a small group of billionaires and their families who controlled much of the Israeli economy. When the campaign began, the subject of economic concentration was barely discussed in Israel. The stories fed growing outrage over inequality, leading to a series of mass demonstrations in 2011. Those protests, in turn, spurred the Knesset to pass a bill to break up the Israeli conglomerates. It was a remarkable display of how one news organization, through tenacious and unflinching reporting over a period of years, can help spur systemic change... Remarkably, of the many high-profile digital-journalism sites—the Huffington Post, The Daily Beast, BuzzFeed, Business Insider—not one scrutinizes America's oligarchs the way TheMarker did Israel's. ProPublica, the prime investigative site on the web, has done impressive reporting on a number of important subjects, including fracking and the secret Fed tapes, but in general it remains wedded to a traditional narrow-focus approach”.

On November 14, 2016, Matt Stoller, a staffer of the United States Senate Committee on the Budget, related in a New York Times article about the concentration bill and the mobile market reform: “But there is a more recent example of success the U.S. could look to: Until 2011 Israel had a similar concentration problem. Social protest and aggressive journalism pushed a ‘concentration bill’ through the Knesset, and the results rippled through society. More competition in the mobile market led to a 90 percent price drop.”
