= Zadik Bino =

Israeli businessman

- צדיק בינו
- Born: 1943 (age 82–83); Iraq
- Occupation: Businessman
- Known for: CEO of First International Bank of Israel (1978–1986); Majority stakeholder in F.I.B.I Holdings and Paz Oil Company
- Awards: Globes Man of the Year (2006)

Zadik Bino (Hebrew: צדיק בינו; born 1943) is an Israeli businessman. In 2018, he ranked #1867 on the Forbes World's Billionaires list, with wealth listed at US$1.2 billion.

== Early life and education ==
Of Iraqi Jewish descent, Bino was born in Iraq.

== Career ==
Bino was CEO of First International Bank of Israel from 1978 to 1986. Two decades later, he bought the bank.

In 2006, he was named Globes Man of the Year in Tel Aviv, Israel. He was ranked Israel's 24th-richest man in 2006 by Forbes.

He has a majority stake in F.I.B.I Holdings Company, which controls the First International Bank. He also owns 51% of fuel company Paz, as well as stakes in Channel 2 licensee Reshet, ad agency Kesher Barel, and real estate in Tel Aviv, London and, most recently, India. In 2006 he acquired the Ashdod refineries and completed the acquisition of Bank Otsar Ha-Hayal from Bank Hapoalim.

On 5 March 2021, Forbes listed his net worth at US$1.4 billion.
