= School of Medicine, University of Patras =

- Type: Medical school
- Established: 1977
- Dean: Professor Venetsana Kyriazopoulou
- Location: Patras, Achaea, Greece
- Affiliations: University of Patras
- Website: med.upatras.gr

School of Medicine is one of the two departments of the School of Health Sciences, University of Patras.

The School of Medicine of the University of Patras was founded in 1977 and admitted its first students in October of the same academic year. During the functioning of 28 years, received a degree 2321 students Medicine and dozens another with MSc and PhD.

== Staff ==
The Teaching and Research Staff (TRS) of the department consists of about 150 people (Professors, Associate Professors, Assistant Professors, Lecturers). Members EIB / ACC, administrative staff is 36 people.

== Departments ==
- Division of Basic Medical Sciences I
  - Department of Biochemistry
  - Department of General Biology
  - Department of Medical Physics
- Division of Basic Medical Sciences II
  - Department of Anatomy
  - Department of General Pharmacology
  - Department of Physiology
- Division of Clinical Laboratories
  - Department of Microbiology
  - Department of Nuclear Medicine
  - Department of Pathology
  - Department of Public Health
  - Department of Radiology
- Division of Internal Medicine Ι
  - Department of Internal Medicine
- Division of Paediatrics & Obstetrics – Gynaecology
  - Department of Obstetrics - Gynecology
  - Department of Paediatric Surgery
  - Department of Paediatrics
- Division of Surgery
  - Department of Anaesthesiology and Intensive Care
  - Department of Cardiothoracic Surgery
  - Department of Neurosurgery
  - Department of Ophthalmology
  - Department of Orthopaedics
  - Department of Otorhinolaryngology
  - Department of Surgery
  - Department of Urology
  - Department of Vascular Surgery

=== Research Infrastructures ===
- Functional Microscopy
- Microarray Analysis
- RealTime PCR
- Phosphorimager
- Ultracentrifuge

== Establishments ==
=== Building of preclinical functional ===
In the preclinical functional building houses the Department of Secretariat, offices of faculty of Basic Medical Sciences and Clinical Laboratories, the Laboratory and Tutorial Rooms and various auxiliary rooms for students, where take place various events.

=== Library of the School of Medicine ===
The School of Medicine at the University of Patras have an independent library to be used from the student's community of the School. The library provides a reading room (150 seats), a copy machine with charge of use and computers. Users may also borrow books from the library as long as they have the library card.

== Studies ==
=== Undergraduate Studies ===
School of Medicine offers students the six-year course of study. Organizational has 7 areas:

- Basic Medical Sciences I
- Basic Medical Sciences II
- Clinical Laboratory
- Pathology I
- Pathology II
- Surgical
- Pediatrics, Obstetrics, Gynecology

=== Postgraduate Studies ===
School of Medicine of University of Patras offers the following postgraduate studies programs:

- Postgraduate studies programme "Basic Medical Sciences"
- Interuniversity Postgraduate Course in "Biomedical Engineering"
- Interdepartmental Postgraduate Course in Medical Physics
- Interdepartmental Program of Graduate Studies in "Informatics for Life Sciences"
- Postgraduate Course in “Public Health”
