= PAWS Chicago =

US non-profit organization

- Formation: 1997
- Type: Non-profit
- Legal status: 501(c)(3)
- CEO: Annette Laico
- Main organ: Board of Directors
- Revenue: $16,427,736 (2016)
- Website: pawschicago.org

PAWS Chicago is a non-profit animal shelter organization based in Chicago, Illinois. Founded in 1997 by Paula Fasseas and her daughter Alexis Fasseas, PAWS focuses on solutions to end the euthanasia of homeless pets.

== Etymology ==
"PAWS" is an acronym for Pets Are Worth Saving.

== History ==
In 1998, Fasseas launched PAWS Chicago with an adoption event titled "Angels with Tails" aiming to save the lives of stray or homeless animals. The event facilitated animal adoptions, and was intended to raise awareness around the issue of pet overpopulation and the euthanasia of homeless animals. The event was held on Michigan Ave in Chicago, where the organization partnered with local businesses and boutiques who agreed to showcase animals in their storefronts.

In 2000, PAWS opened the Lurie Spay and Neuter Clinic. The clinic offers free and low cost services in the Chicago area, performing over 17,000 spray and neuter surgeries each year.

On September 7, 2007, PAWS opened its Lincoln Park adoption center located at 1997 N. Clybourn Ave. The new adoption center cost $9 million and is 13,000 square feet. It was the first cage-free shelter in the Midwest.

PAWS works with shelters across the U.S., particularly in times of crisis and natural disaster. During Hurricane Katrina in 2005, PAWS volunteers drove from Chicago to Louisiana to rescue 200 pets caught in the floods. PAWS also assisted in rescuing animals in the 2008 flooding in Cedar Rapids, Iowa, and Quincy, Illinois, as well as the 2013 floods in Oklahoma. In August 2016, PAWS assisted in rescuing animals from floodings in Louisiana. PAWS also assisted in rescue efforts for Hurricane Irma in Florida, Hurricane Harvey in Texas in 2017, as well as Hurricane Michael in Florida in 2018.

On December 1, 2013, Merrick Pet Care and PAWS teamed up to provide meals for the cats and dogs of PAWS. Merrick Pet Care provides food for all of PAWS pets as well as giving each pet that is newly adopted and their owner a supply of food.

Since its inception, PAWS Chicago has reduced the number of animals euthanized in the city by 80 percent, becoming an active participant in the No Kill Movement.

== Awards and recognition ==
In 2018, PAWS Chicago received a 4-star rating from Charity Navigator for the 16th consecutive year. Charity Navigator assesses non-profit organizations by rating their performances based on Financial Health and their Accountability and Transparency. The assessment found that charity's total revenue sums up to $16,427,736 while 89.4 percent of the organizations total expenses are spent on the programs and services it delivers.

In November 2012, Chicago magazine named PAWS Chicago as one of their "gold standard charities" under their Guide to Charitable Giving in Chicago. The guide is a means of navigating which charities readers should donate to when considering charitable gifting during the holiday season. The charities were ranked by a group philanthropic consultants, professors, and Charity Navigator, a non-profit website that rates the practicality of non-profit organizations on a four-scale rating.

In January 2007, Paula Fasseas was labeled a "Transformer" by Chicago magazine and honored as the magazine's Chicagoan of the Year. The award is set out to honor a handful of people that have changed Chicago for the better.

In 2003, PAWS Chicago won the Chicago Innovation Award by the Chicago Sun-Times. The award goes out to ten businesses in Chicago that have presented successful business developments and innovative marketing techniques.

In 2008, Oprah Winfrey visited PAWS Chicago during the filming of a three-part series she was producing on puppy mills. The feature showcased good living environments and lifesaving work, which aided in putting PAWS name on the map across the country. Winfrey featured her self-funded suite for PAWS in loving memory of her cocker spaniel, Sophie, whom is featured on the 2009 cover of O, The Oprah Magazine. After the issue was released, there has been about a 50 percent decrease in the number of pets being euthanized in Chicago per year.

== Events ==
The annual 'PAWS Beach Party' is organized to raise money for the organization. PAWS' 16th annual Beach Party in 2018 attracted over 500 guests and 125 dogs, raising over $300,000 for the organization. The money raised went towards funding PAWS' lifesaving program for homeless cats and dogs in addition to a renovation and an expansion of the medical center.

The Fur Ball is an annual fundraising gala that showcases rescue cats and dogs for adoption. The gala includes a number of activities for the pets to participate in, such as buffets and paw-dicures while the humans engage in live auctions and raffles. In 2017, 800 people and 200 dogs attended the ball, collectively raising $1.3 million for the organization. In 2013, Smashing Pumpkins co-founder William Corgan and Michelin Guide–awarded star-chef Curtis Duffy made appearances at the Fur Ball, curating an event of their own to be auctioned off during the gala.

Northwestern College in Bridgeview, Illinois, hosted a 5K Run/Walk in September 2018 to benefit PAWS Chicago. Dubbed "PAWS for a Cause", the family-friendly event is open to the public and is designed to bring students, alumni, staff, and the Bridgeview/Burbank/Bedford Park communities together to raise funds for helpless animals in need.

PAWS Chicago's 5K Walk/Run was named one of Chicago's Top 100 Events in 2016 and 2017, and Top 10 Athletic Events in 2017 by BizBash. In this event, owners and their pets are allowed to participate in a 5K. In addition to the race, there is also food and games for the participants.

The Holiday Adopt-A-Thon is a two-day adoption marathon intended to help homeless pets find a home in time for the holidays. The event takes place during the holiday season to reduce the risk of the euthanasia of homeless pets in animal shelters during a time of the year when the shelters are short-staffed.
