= Ann and Robert H. Lurie Foundation =

American charitable foundation

Ann and Robert H. Lurie Family Foundation was incorporated in 1986 (40 years ago) and, in 2000, the name was changed to Ann and Robert H. Lurie Foundation. The Foundation was established by Chicagoans Robert H. Lurie, a real estate and investment magnate who died from colon cancer in 1990, at age 48, and his wife, Ann Lurie, who died from brain cancer in 2024, aged 79.

Ann's charitable contributions have been made both individually and through the Foundation. These include endowing the Robert H. Lurie Engineering Center and the Lurie Tower and The Samuel Zell and Robert H. Lurie Institute for Entrepreneurial Studies, as well as funding building and equipment costs for the Biomedical Engineering and Nanofabrication facilities, all at the University of Michigan campus in Ann Arbor; endowing The Robert H. Lurie Comprehensive Cancer Center of Northwestern University, funds to build and support the Robert H. Lurie Research Center and for numerous other education, healthcare and research initiatives at Northwestern; $100 million to build Ann & Robert H. Lurie Children's Hospital of Chicago; a $10 million endowment to maintain the Lurie Garden at Millennium Park in Chicago; multi-year support for the former AID Village Clinics, a comprehensive healthcare initiative in rural Kenya; funding to build 30 rural schools in Ethiopia; and support for the research and advocacy work of Human Rights Watch in the Horn of Africa.
