= Udi Nisan =

Israeli academic and businessman

Udi (Ehud) Nisan
- עודי (אהוד) ניסן
- Occupations: Academic, business executive, professor
- Known for: Public economics, Tax and budget policies
- Title: Former Director of the Budgets Department, Israel Ministry of Finance
- Board member of: Elbit Systems, Delek

Academic background
- Education: Hebrew University

Academic work
- Institutions: Harvard Kennedy School

Udi (Ehud) Nisan (Hebrew: עודי (אהוד) ניסן; born 1967) is an Israeli academic, business executive and professor in the School of Public Policy and Government of the Hebrew University.

== Career ==
From 2009 to 2011, Nisan was the director of the budgets department of the Israel Ministry of Finance, and from 2007 to 2009, he served as the director of the Israeli Government Companies Authority. From 1999 until 2002 he served as the CEO of the Jerusalem Development Authority.

Nisan has earned bachelor's and master's degrees in economics and business administration, in addition to a PhD in public economics and policy, all from the Hebrew University in Jerusalem. His post-doctoral studies were conducted at the Kennedy School of Harvard University from 2006 to 2007, and he returned there as a Senior Fellow between 2011 and 2012. His research primarily focuses on public economics, delving into topics like taxation and budgeting policies, as well as housing, planning, and regulatory issues.

He serves as Independent Director at Elbit Systems since 2016. He is an External Director of Harel Insurance Finance Services and Rekah Pharmaceutical Industry, and a member of the board of Bezalel Academy of Arts and Design. From 2013 to 2016, he was the chair of the board of directors of Israeli fuel company Delek.

Nisan served as the chairman of the Israel Committee for Cultural Budgeting between 2022 and 2023, and was tasked with reviewing the Ministry of Culture's funding policies to promote independent and creative culture accessible to all citizens of Israel. In 2023, the committee decided to discontinue its operations, a decision underscored by concerns regarding the safeguarding of creative freedom without an independent legal system. In a letter to the Israeli Culture Minister Miki Zohar, Nisan expressed that a government which, in his view, mutes judicial criticism regarding the legitimacy of its decisions cannot boast of having cultural and creative freedom.

== Published works ==
- Grinstein, A.; Nisan, U. (2009). "Demarketing, minorities, and national attachment". Journal of Marketing. 73 (2): 105–122.
- Dahan, M.; Nisan, U. (2007). "Unintended consequences of increasing block tariffs pricing policy in urban water". Water Resources Research. 43 (3).
- Katz, D.; Grinstein, A.; Kronrod, A.; Nisan, U. (2016). "Evaluating the effectiveness of a water conservation campaign: Combining experimental and field methods". Journal of Environmental Management. 180: 335–343.
- Dahan, M.; Nisan, U. (2010). "The effect of benefits level on take-up rates: evidence from a natural experiment". International Tax and Public Finance. 17: 151–173.
- Crew, MA; Kleindorfer, PR; Campbell, JI (2009). Handbook of worldwide postal reform. Edward Elgar Publishing.
- Katz, D.; Kronrod, A.; Grinstein, A.; Nisan, U. (2018). "Still waters run deep: Comparing assertive and suggestive language in water conservation campaigns". Water. 10 (3): 275.
- Dahan, M.; Nisan, U. (2007). "The effect of benefits level on take-up rates: Evidence from a natural experiment". CESifo Working Paper Series.
- Dahan, M.; Nisan, U. (2006). "Low take-up rates: the role of information". CESifo Working Paper Series.
- Dahan, M.; Nisan, U. (2020). "Late payments, liquidity constraints and the mismatch between due dates and paydays". CESifo Working Paper.
