= TheMarker =

Israeli daily business newspaper

- Type: Daily newspaper, monthly magazine, website
- Owner: Haaretz Group
- Founder: Guy Rolnik
- Editor: Sivan Klingbail
- Launched: 2000; 26 years ago
- Language: Hebrew, English
- City: Tel Aviv
- Country: Israel
- Circulation: 6.6%
- Website: themarker.com

TheMarker (Hebrew: דה-מרקר) is a Hebrew-language daily business newspaper published by the Haaretz Group in Israel. It also has a monthly print magazine and holds events on business-related issues.

TheMarker was founded in 1999 by journalist and entrepreneur Guy Rolnik along with Haaretz Group and U.S.-based investors. Five years after TheMarker launched, Haaretz newspaper group decided to terminate its long-standing business section and relaunch it as a daily print newspapers called TheMarker, the brand that was created online.

The chief editor of TheMarker is Sivan Klingbail, while the editor of the monthly magazine is Eytan Avriel. Some of TheMarker's articles are translated to English and appear in the English version of Haaretz in cooperation with the International New York Times.

== History ==
TheMarker, founded by Rolnik and Haaretz group, was incorporated in 1999 and launched in March 2000. Joined by his two friends and co-founders – Avriel and Ido Pollak – Rolnik launched what would become the first business news website and the first online newsroom in Israel.

In December 1999, the American business news site TheStreet, entered into an agreement with Haaretz, to invest $2.25 million in exchange for a 25% stake in TheMarker. According to the investment agreement, TheStreet.com published selected news and articles on Israeli technology companies from the TheMarker site, and in exchange TheMarker published selected news and articles from TheStreet.com. Following the bursting of the dot-com bubble the investment in TheMarker was fully impaired by TheStreet.

In 2001 TheMarker started publishing a monthly print magazine, TheMarker Magazine. The magazine publishes yearly lists of "Israel's 100 most influential people" and "Israel's 500 richest people", which draw considerable attention. In 2003 started organizing business-related events under its own brand.

In 2005 Haaretz daily newspaper's economic section was terminated and Haaretz launched TheMarker as a daily newspaper.

Following the relaunch, the number of Haaretz's paid subscribers increased significantly: by the end of 2006, the number of paid subscribers rose to all-time high of over 60,000 and ad revenues from TheMarker's print edition grew by 50% compared to the pre-rebranding period.

In 2008 the print edition of TheMarker became available as a stand-alone product as well.

In 2007 TheMarker launched TheMarker Café, Israel's first social network for grown-ups and the first launched by a news organization.

In 2026, Sivan Klingbail told employees that she wants to end her role as editor.

== Awards and recognition ==
Four of the awards were related to the January 2005 launch of TheMarker as a daily paid for newspaper:

Guy Rolnik won the Israel's Marketing Association's "Marketing person of the month" for July 2005. The judges wrote: "Rolnik is the person behind TheMarker's latest move—the launch of the daily newspaper under TheMarker's brand—a move that is a unique success. The launch of the new newspaper brought a dramatic change in the newspaper's position in the economic arena, a renewal in subscriber additions in Haaretz, a decrease in churning and a strengthening of the loyalty of the readers to the newspaper”. Later that year he also won the association's "Marketing person of the year" award.

In 2006 TheMarker won the Israeli EFFIE Award in the media category for that year.

1. In 2007 TheMarker won the EFFIE Platinum award for "Building the strongest economic brand in Israel", which is awarded to multi-year marketing efforts and is considered the “Oscar” of marketing awards.

Some of the personal awards Rolnik won for his journalistic achievements include:

1. June 2005: The Movement for Quality Government in Israel's Knight of Quality Government award. The Movement said that it was awarded Rolnik "in gratitude for a unique contribution in the media for uncovering faults and in the public service, for a struggle against corruption and for the improvement of the quality of public sector. In his commentary, Rolnik raises the level of public criticism on the government's behavior and underscores its importance to the improvement of the quality of government. By doing so he sets an example of quality to his colleagues in the media and to Israeli society".

The Sokolov Prize for Lifetime Achievement. In its decision to grant the prize to Rolnik, the jury wrote: "Guy Rolnik untiringly shed light on problems in the structure of the Israeli economy, the judges commented in granting him the award. Notably, Rolnik demonstrated the concentration of capital in the hands of a small number of financial organizations connected to the holders of political and governing power. He exposed grave flaws in the current structure and demanded they be corrected to ensure the existence of a more resilient, just and egalitarian economic system".

=== Press mentions ===
In May 2004, HaAyin HaShevi'it interviewed journalists, business people and media experts in Israel who cited Rolnik as an influential columnist.

In February 2011, The New Yorker's editor, David Remnick, published a story about Haaretz and Schocken.

In March 2015, journalist and media critic Michael Massing highlighted the work of TheMarker and Rolnik in an essay, "How to fix American Journalism", that appeared in the special issue of The Nation magazine for its 150th anniversary. According to Massing, the unique campaign that waged Rolnik as editor-in-chief of TheMarker is the model for fixing American journalism:

== See also ==
- List of newspapers in Israel
