= Robert H. Lurie Comprehensive Cancer Center =

Cancer research center in Chicago, Illinois, United States

- Northwestern Medicine

Geography
- Location: 675 North Saint Clair Street, Chicago, Illinois, United States
- Coordinates: 41.89469750°N 87.62246870°W

Organization
- Type: Specialist
- Affiliated university: Feinberg School of Medicine

Services
- Standards: NCI Comprehensive Cancer Center
- Specialty: Cancer research

History
- Former name: Robert H. Lurie Cancer Center (before comprehensive designation)
- Opened: 1974

Links
- Website: www.cancer.northwestern.edu
- Lists: Hospitals in Illinois

The Robert H. Lurie Comprehensive Cancer Center of Northwestern University (Lurie Cancer Center) is a National Cancer Institute (NCI)-designated Comprehensive Cancer Center located on Northwestern Memorial Hospital's downtown medical campus in the Streeterville neighborhood of Chicago, Illinois, United States. One of two NCI-designated cancer centers in Illinois, Lurie Cancer Center's physicians and scientists hold faculty appointments within the Feinberg School of Medicine, Weinberg College of Arts and Sciences, McCormick School of Engineering and Applied Sciences, and other academic units across Northwestern University. Together, they bring their combined knowledge and expertise to patients at Northwestern Memorial Hospital, Ann & Robert H. Children's Hospital of Chicago, Shirley Ryan AbilityLab and the Jesse Brown VA Medical Center. Additionally, Lurie Cancer Center is a founding member of the National Comprehensive Cancer Network and a member of the Big Ten Cancer Research Consortium.

Founded in 1974, the center was dedicated through a gift of endowment from the Ann and Robert H. Lurie Foundation in 1991. Lurie Cancer Center treats nearly 17,000 new patients each year.

== History ==
Northwestern's Cancer Center, founded in 1974, was renamed in 1991, in recognition of a gift from Ann & Robert H. Lurie.

In 1996, during a visit to Chicago, Diana, Princess of Wales visited the Lurie Cancer Center to help raise money for cancer research and to benefit a cancer support group.

In 1997, the center received the "comprehensive cancer center" designation from the National Cancer Institute, prompting a name change to the "Robert H. Lurie Comprehensive Cancer Center".

In 2009, the William Wirtz family (owners of the Chicago Blackhawks) donated $19.5 million to Northwestern Memorial Hospital to support cancer research and clinical advancements within the Robert H. Lurie Comprehensive Cancer Center of Northwestern University.

In 2014, Leonidas Platanias was appointed director of the Lurie Cancer Center.

In 2017, teaching affiliate Lurie Children's Hospital proposed an addition of 24 new pediatric beds for children with cancer and blood disorders.

In 2018, the Robert H. Lurie Comprehensive Cancer Center earned the highest rating possible from the National Cancer Institute, an "exceptional" ranking on the competitive renewal of its Cancer Center Support Grant, and a 36 percent increase in funding over the previous award.

== About ==
Lurie Cancer Center is geographically located inside many of the buildings on Northwestern University's Chicago campus. Pediatric cancer services are located within Lurie Children's Hospital. Lurie Cancer Center's Maggie Daley Center for Women's Cancer Care, Lynn Sage Comprehensive Breast Center and inpatient cancer care are located within Prentice Women's Hospital. Outpatient cancer clinics, radiation oncology, imaging, surgical services, and the Clinical Trials Office are in located in the Galter, Feinberg, Lavin and Arkes Pavilions, and a developmental therapeutics clinic is in the Olson Pavilion.

Collaborative research opportunities on Northwestern's Chicago and Evanston campuses enable Lurie Cancer Center investigators to integrate the spectrum of basic, clinical and population-based research, and explore new ways to bridge these scientific areas.

=== Awards ===
Lurie Cancer Center's cancer program at Northwestern Memorial Hospital was ranked No. 6 in the country by U.S. News & World Report in its 2021–2022 list of Best Hospitals for Cancer, and #15 in the country for pediatric cancer (Lurie Children's).

== See also ==
- Northwestern Medicine
- Northwestern Memorial Hospital
- Lurie Children's Hospital
