= Hanoverhill Starbuck =

Canadian Holstein breeding bull

- Breed: Holstein
- Born: April 26, 1979; Port Perry, Ontario
- Died: September 17, 1998 (aged 19); Saint-Hyacinthe, Quebec
- Nationality: Canada
- Occupation: Breeding bull
- Years active: 1985–1995
- Owner: CIAQ

Hanoverhill Starbuck was a Canadian Holstein breeding bull. Calved in 1979, Starbuck was sired by RORA Elevation and purchased from Hanover Hills Holsteins by the Artificial Insemination Centre of Quebec (Centre d'insémination artificielle du Québec, CIAQ). Considered exceptional for conformation and genetics, Starbuck won numerous prizes at Holstein shows and through artificial insemination sired over 200,000 cows in dozens of countries, earning CIAQ $25 million. By 2000 it was estimated that most of the world's dairy cows were related to Starbuck, contributing significantly to inbreeding. Following its death in 1998, Starbuck was one of the first animals cloned for commercial purposes, though the clone's semen was never approved for sale.

== Life and career ==
Starbuck was bred by master breeders Hanover Hill Holsteins of Port Perry, Ontario. (Note: Hanover Hill was a 300-acre (120 ha) farm in Port Perry owned and operated by Peter Heffering and Ken Trevena. They had been successful breeders in New York but as the American dairy industry placed singular emphasis on lactation index, in 1973 they moved their business to Canada where attitudes better aligned with their breeding approach based on heredity, type, style and longevity.) A purebred Holstein, he was calved on 26 April 1979. His sire was RORA Elevation and his dam was Anacres Astronaut Ivanhoe. In May, Starbuck was purchased by CIAQ. Starbuck was known for its "sturdy frame, feet and legs", won at several Holstein shows around the world and was an agricultural celebrity. The British Holstein Society Journal described Starbuck as "the sire that attracts endless superlatives – one of a kind, the greatest, phenomenal, the king, Mr. Excitement, or ... 'Simply the Best'."

Through artificial insemination, Starbuck proved itself able to reliably sire high-quality milking cows: large, with consistent frames and body types, and high milk production with elevated protein levels, which met a trend in the dairy market for milk with higher protein and less fat. Between 1985 and 1995, Starbuck sired over 200,000 female offspring (over 62,000 of these in Canada) and 209 proven male offspring. Several of his sons also became prominent breeding bulls, including Madawaska Aerostar, Hanoverhill Raider, Hanoverhill Lieutenant and Hanover Hill Lincoln, each rated Class Extra Sire. The CIAQ earned almost $25 million from the sale of 685,000 doses of Starbuck's semen in 45 countries. By 2011, Starbuck had over 3.5 million descendants.

== Effect on inbreeding ==
The widespread use of Starbuck as a sire in the 1990s resulted in the effective population size of the Canadian Holstein herd dropping to a record low of 33 (an effective population of 50 is considered critical). By 2000, it was estimated that most of the world's dairy cows were related to Starbuck. Pedigree analysis revealed that 93% of Holsteins born in Canada between 2003 and 2005 were descendants of Starbuck, and 11% of total inbreeding was traced to Starbuck. Starbuck was also a significant contributor to inbreeding in the Holstein herds of the United States, Denmark, Germany, Luxemburg and Tunisia. Through diversification, the effective population of the Canadian Holstein herd had grown to 114 by 2007.

== Clone ==
Starbuck died on 17 September 1998 at the CIAQ complex in Saint-Hyacinthe, Quebec. The previous month, tissue and cell samples were taken and in December 1999, a cloned embryo was transplanted into a cow. It took 68 attempts to successfully clone and implant the embryo, at a cost of about $50,000. The cloning was conducted by a joint research team led by Lawrence Smith, through a partnership between CIAQ, Alliance Bovitag and the Université de Montréal Faculty of Veterinary Medicine. The clone, Starbuck II, was born by Caesarean section on 7 September 2000. (Note: Starbuck II's birth came three years after the groundbreaking cloning of the sheep Dolly, the first cloned mammal.) It was the first bull cloned in Canada, the first clone from a mature mammal in Canada and one of the first mammals cloned for commercial purposes.

Starbuck II had 30 progeny through artificial insemination. Of these, the 19 females were studied through their development. They were clinically healthy and displayed normal behaviour, growth, health and bloodwork, though their heart rates, respiratory rates and body temperature were slightly lower than age-matched control animals. Most of these animals were euthanized, though seven were kept at the University of Guelph for an extended study. While Starbuck II was genetically identical to Starbuck and there was interest in its semen from farmers, there was no government approval to sell semen from a cloned animal. Starbuck II's semen was collected and frozen for several years. With the breeding industry shift toward genomics, Starbuck II was euthanized in 2010.

== Legacy ==
Use of Starbuck's frozen semen continued beyond its natural life. A 2012 report in Ontario Farmer found several dairy farms across Eastern Canada were using Starbuck semen due to its well established breeding results, particularly to compensate for deficiencies in a cow's line or when a cow otherwise had difficulty carrying a calf to term.

Taking its title from the bull, the comedy film Starbuck is about a man who learns that his sperm donations resulted in over 500 children. It was the highest-grossing Canadian film of 2011.
