= Life Matters Media =

Anerican non-profit providing advice

Life Matters Media is a Chicago-based 501(c)(3) nonprofit organization offering news, information, education and resources for those involved in end of life decision-making.

The organization was founded in 2013 by WGN-TV journalist Randi Belisomo and oncologist Mary F. Mulcahy, an associate professor of medicine at Northwestern University's Feinberg School of Medicine.

== Overview ==
Life Matters Media provides news, opinion, and general information about end of life-related issues, such as hospice care, palliative medicine, and advance health care planning.

According to the organization, end of life decisions should be considered carefully, and neutral platforms are best for encouraging frank dialogue about them. The website is written and managed by Belisomo and reporter Daniel Gaitan.

== History ==
Life Matters Media was founded by Randi Belisomo, a journalist, and Mary F. Mulcahy, a physician, who realized that they failed in communicating about what was truly important during a crucial time. Mulcahy and Belisomo formed the 501(c)(3) in 2013 with the vision that their work could result in easier and more comprehensive dialogue about issues pertaining to the end of life. They realized the wide-ranging ramifications of the absence of these important discussions and the planning and preparation that stem from them.

Belisomo's husband, journalist Carlos Hernandez Gomez, was diagnosed with metastatic colon cancer in 2009 at age 35. He came into the care of Mulcahy, a medical oncologist at Northwestern Memorial Hospital in Chicago. Though Mulcahy always told the couple that his cancer was incurable, she did stress that it was "treatable".

Sooner than Belisomo was prepared for, she found herself in an intensive care unit, making a decision to withdraw life support. Months after his death, Belisomo approached Mulcahy to ask her why she never told them that Hernandez Gomez was "dying". The question stumped her, but it changed the way Mulcahy practiced medicine.

In forming Life Matters Media, Mulcahy and Belisomo hope to normalize the conversation about death so that families have the opportunity to pursue their most ideal vision of true quality of life at the end of life.

== Website ==
The organization produces original content and often covers stories receiving scant attention.

A wide range of policy makers, health and law reporters and ethicists contribute articles and op-eds, in addition to the organization's daily news coverage. Some contributors endorse physician-assisted suicide, while others write against the controversial practice.

The organization avoids partnerships and monetary contributions from organizations advocating physician-assisted suicide and euthanasia. However, it respects all beliefs and traditions.

In 2017, Gaitan was interviewed by producers of CNBC's American Greed for his reporting on Passages Hospice, a now-shuttered Illinois for-profit hospice company that fraudulently billed Medicare millions of dollars and exploited some of the state's most vulnerable.

The organization is supported by individual donors and foundations including the Dr. Scholl Foundation, Grant Health Care Foundation, MR Bauer Foundation and Community Memorial Foundation.

== Public Education and Outreach ==
The organization's educational and outreach program is a major initiative between Life Matters Media and the City of Chicago. It is now in its third year. At each of Chicago's 23 municipal senior centers, founders Randi Belisomo and Mary Mulcahy, sometimes accompanied by other end of life care experts, help seniors consider their own end of life care preferences and provide them next-step resources.

They survey attendees about their personal considerations of end of life care; this data, alongside the social demography of each senior center's surrounding neighborhood, is compiled regularly in partnership with Northwestern University's Buehler Center on Aging, Health and Society with the hope of obtaining a unique and comprehensive landscape of the state of end of life care decision-making in Chicago.

The organization also hosts events for people of all ages and stages of life. Their original programming has focused on religion and end of life care, digital document storage and caregiving.

In 2018, Chicago Mayor Rahm Emanuel issued a proclamation on behalf of Life Matters Media urging city residents to make their future health care wishes known on April 16, National Health Care Decisions Day.

=== Interfaith panel ===
Six Chicago-area faith leaders addressed the importance of end of life decision-making and discussed how their respective beliefs, rituals and traditions impact the process during a March 2015 event at Northwestern University. Orthodox, Hindu, Islamic, Jewish, Protestant and Roman Catholic perspectives were represented during the panel, hosted by Life Matters Media in collaboration with the Council of Religious Leaders of Metropolitan Chicago.

=== "Death Over Dinner" ===
In 2014, Life Matters Media hosted Chicago's first-ever "Death over Dinner", a movement aiming to launch a "patient-led revolution at the dinner table" by encouraging frank discussion about death and dying. It grew to welcome the largest attendance known to the "Death Over Dinner" movement since its founding. Chicago Tribune columnist Barbara Brotman gave the event a glowing review, writing "there is no reason this subject can't be dealt with openly and in convivial surroundings."

The organization held its latest "Death over Dinner" in September 2015 in La Grange, Illinois.
