= ABS Global =

American company

ABS Global Inc
- Company type: subsidiary
- Industry: Frozen bovine semen
- Founded: 1941
- Founder: John Rockefeller Prentice
- Headquarters: DeForest, Wisconsin
- Area served: Worldwide
- Products: Frozen bovine semen, technical services
- Parent: Genus plc
- Website: www.absglobal.com

ABS Global, formerly the American Breeders Service, is an artificial insemination company that sells frozen bovine semen. Its headquarters are in DeForest, Wisconsin.

American Breeders Service was founded in 1941 by John Rockefeller Prentice. It was originally called the American Dairy Guernsey Associates of Northern Illinois and changed its name to American Breeders Service in 1950.

As of 1962, the company was headquartered in Madison, Wisconsin. Its facilities reportedly stored over 1.5 million ampules of frozen bull semen. The semen was kept frozen with liquid nitrogen.

American Breeders Service began selling its products in the Soviet Union in 1983, after conducting negotiations there for six years previous. That year, the company cloned two bulls, named Divide and Duplicate, from one embryo.

As of 1983, American Breeders Service was owned by W. R. Grace and Company. Its name was changed to ABS Global in 1994, after the company was bought by an investment bank. On November 15, 1999, Genus plc bought ABS Global from Protein Genetics, a New York–based firm. When the sale closed, ABS had around 340 employees, 150 of which were in DeForest.
