= Abra Prentice Wilkin =

American philanthropist

- Born: July 30, 1942 (age 84)
- Education: The Latin School of Chicago, The Ethel Walker School
- Spouses: Jon Anderson & James Wilkin
- Children: 3, two daughters and a son
- Parent(s): John Rockefeller Prentice, Abbie Cantrill Prentice

Abra Prentice Wilkin (born July 30, 1942) is an American philanthropist. She is the daughter of John Rockefeller Prentice (1902–1972) and his wife, Abbie Cantrill Prentice; a great-great-granddaughter of Standard Oil tycoon John D. Rockefeller (1839–1937). Prentice Wilkin attended both The Latin School of Chicago and The Ethel Walker School in Simsbury, Connecticut.

She has been married twice. Her first marriage was to journalist Jon Anderson, and she has three children from that marriage: two daughters, Ashley Anderson Norton and Abra Anderson, and a son, Anthony Anderson. The couple was divorced in 1976 and Anderson died in 2014 aged 77. After their divorce, she married James Wilkin, a consultant on architectural millwork. There are no children from this marriage.

Some of Wilkin's contributions to the city of Chicago include the Prentice Pavilion (the largest birthing center in the Midwest region and among the top 25 birthing centers in the United States) and the Prentice Women's Hospital, which is affiliated with Lurie Children's Hospital and Northwestern Memorial Hospital on the Northwestern University medical campus near downtown Chicago. Wilkin is currently a trustee of The Taft School in Watertown, Connecticut and the Lincoln Park Zoo in Chicago. She is a former trustee of The Ethel Walker School and The Latin School of Chicago.
