= Old Prentice Women's Hospital Building =

Demolished hospital building in Chicago

Prentice Women's Hospital and Maternity Center
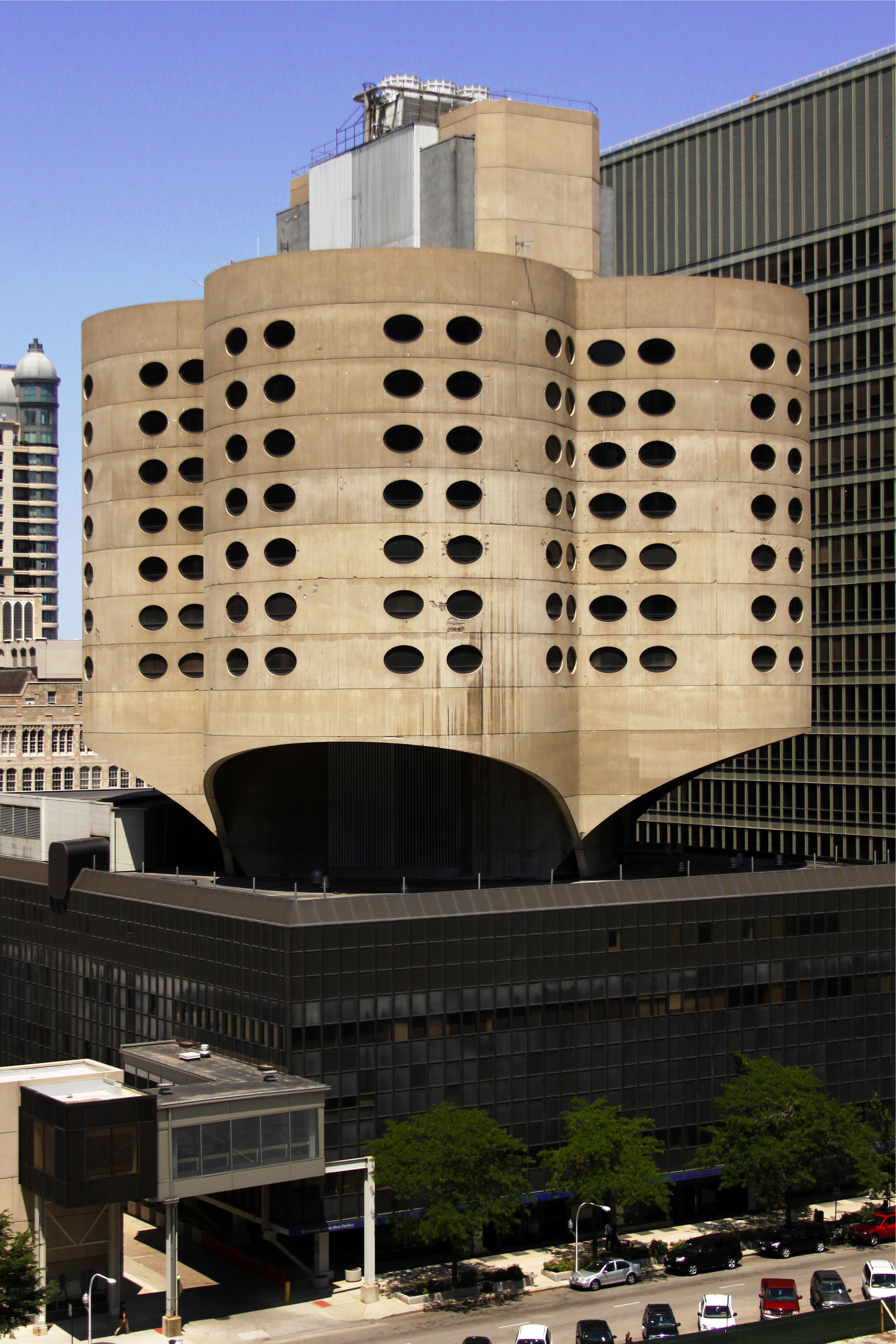
- Interactive map of the Prentice Women's Hospital and Maternity Center area

General information
- Status: Demolished
- Type: Hospital
- Location: 333 E. Superior St. Chicago, Illinois; United States
- Coordinates: 41.89542°N 87.61887°W
- Construction started: 1972
- Completed: 1975
- Opened: December 10, 1975
- Inaugurated: January 22, 1976
- Demolished: 2013–2014

Technical details
- Floor count: 14

Design and construction
- Architect: Bertrand Goldberg & Associates
- Structural engineer: Bertrand Goldberg & Associates
- Main contractor: Paschen Contractors, Inc., Gust K. Newberg Construction Co.

The Prentice Women's Hospital and Maternity Center was a hospital on the Downtown Chicago campus of Northwestern University's Northwestern Memorial Hospital in the Streeterville district of Chicago's Near North Side.

The hospital was replaced with the current new building of Prentice Women's Hospital adjacent to Lurie Children's Hospital.

== Design ==
The Brutalist design by architect Bertrand Goldberg featured a 9-story concrete quatrefoil tower with oval windows cantilevered over a rectangular five-story podium. The tower was used as a maternity center, with nursing stations located in the central core and patient wards in the four lobes—a layout that minimized distances between nurse and patient.

Aside from its unique shape, which structural engineer William F. Baker calls "the only example of its type anywhere in the world", the complex curvilinear structure made construction history with its use of early computer-aided design techniques. Software engineers at Bertrand Goldberg & Associates adapted software used by the aeronautical industry to create a 3D-mapping technique that speeded up the design by months.

== History ==
Goldberg began design in 1971, after the consolidation of Passavant Deaconess Hospital and Wesley Hospital. It was named for Abra “Abbie” Cantrill Prentice. It was opened in 1975.

The building was vacated in 2011 after serving as a hospital until the new Prentice Women's Hospital opened nearby at 250 East Superior Street in 2007. Northwestern University announced plans to demolish it and replace it with a medical research facility. Preservationists and prominent architects (including at least six Pritzker Prize winners) had called on Northwestern and the City of Chicago to save the building, appealing to Chicago's "global reputation as a nurturer of bold and innovative architecture". Jeanne Gang presented a reuse design incorporating the building into a skyscraper.

In the debate over the building's planned demolition, Northwestern argued that the site was needed for medical research aimed at attacking heart disease, cancer, and children's diseases. Preservationists responded that Northwestern Memorial Hospital owns a two-square-block piece of vacant land directly across the street from Prentice, and within a potential skybridge's reach from the university's existing research building.

=== Historic preservation attempts ===
Time-lapse of the building's demolition

In September 2012, the Chicago Landmarks Commission stated it would hold a hearing about the building in autumn 2012. On November 1, 2012, the Landmarks Commission went through an expedited landmark designation process, ultimately voting against the designation.

In late November 2012, Cook County Circuit Court, Judge Neil Cohen entered a stay that restored the commission's preliminary Landmark recommendation for the time being and barred the city from issuing a demolition permit. Judge Cohen set the next court date for December 7, and made it clear that he wanted to see Prentice protected in the interim. After the original denial of landmark status, the National Trust for Historic Preservation sponsored a campaign to save the building.

On March 18, 2013, Northwestern announced the approval of the demolition permit for the building. The National Trust for Historic Preservation cited the site as one of ten historic sites lost in 2013.

On October 29, 2013, an 8-minute documentary, about the struggle to save the building from demolition, was released online after screening at the Durban International Film Festival, Architecture Film Festival Rotterdam, and the Architecture & Design Film Festival New York. The film was produced and directed by Northwestern graduate Nathan Eddy and features interviews with Vanity Fair architecture critic Paul Goldberger, local Chicago preservation groups, and Northwestern University. It played in Chicago in March 2014, when the building was almost completely gone.

Demolition of the building was completed in September 2014.

== Gallery ==
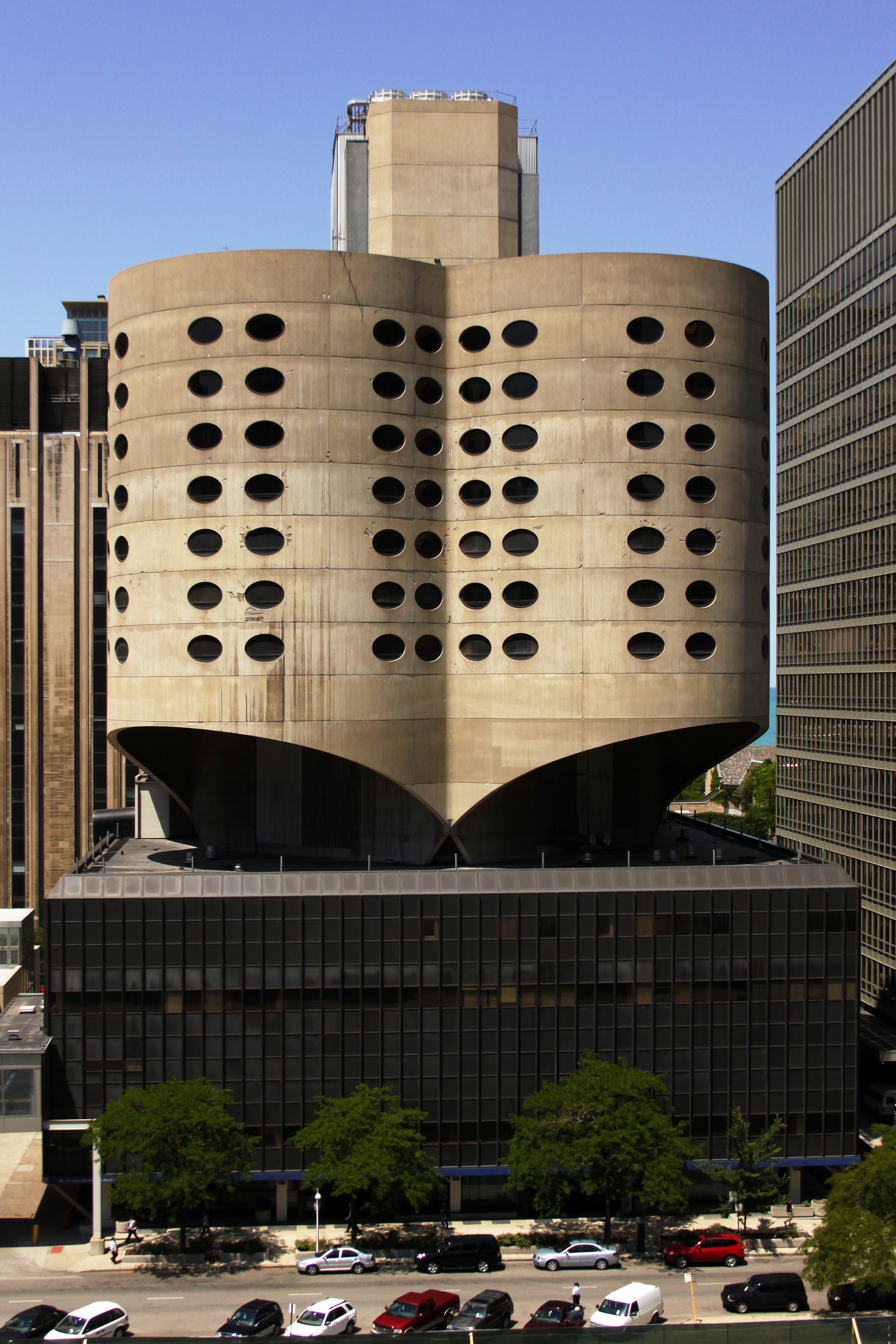
View from the south across the vacant Veteran's Hospital site

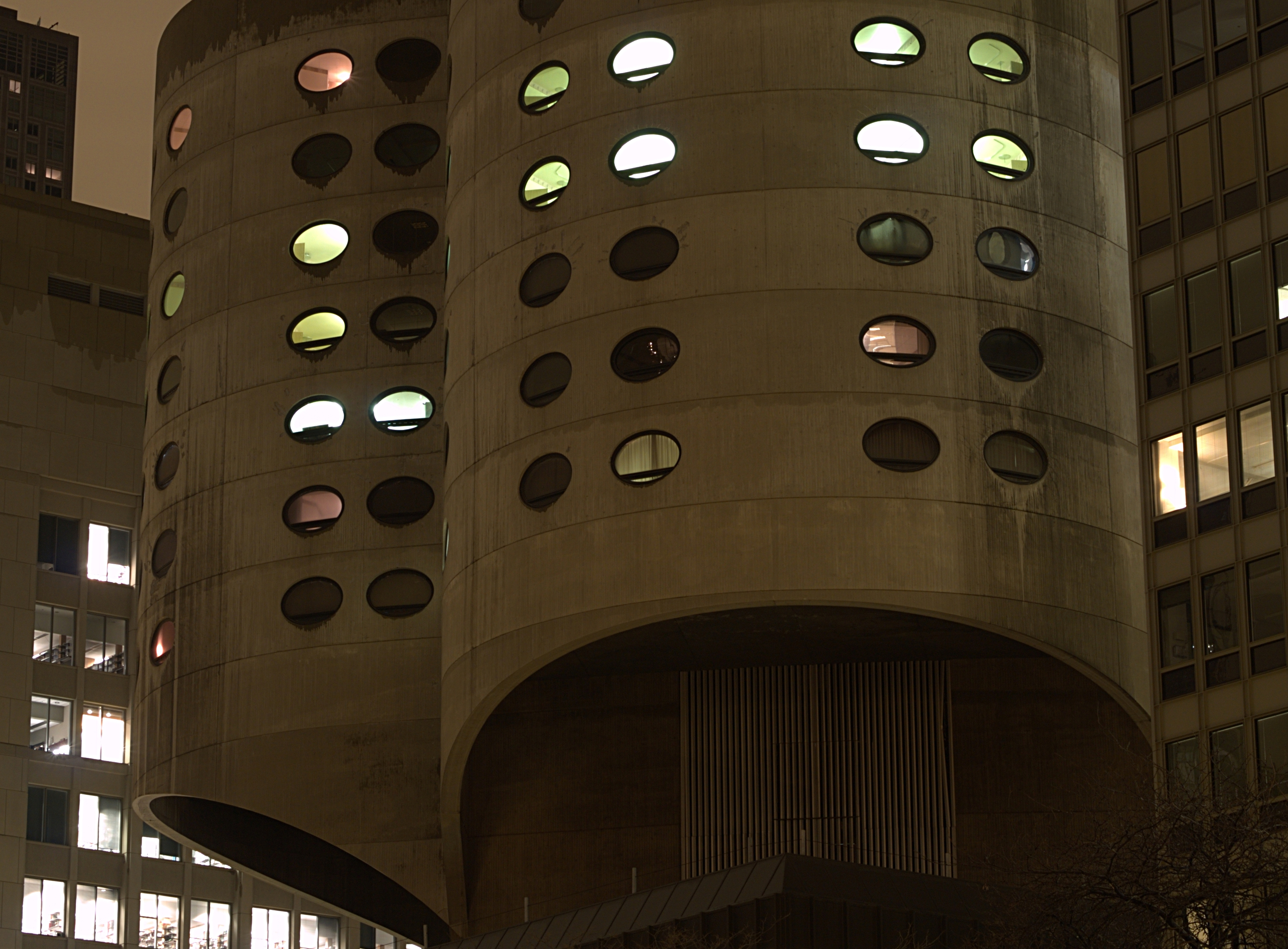
Detail of the tower facade at night, with oval windows illuminated

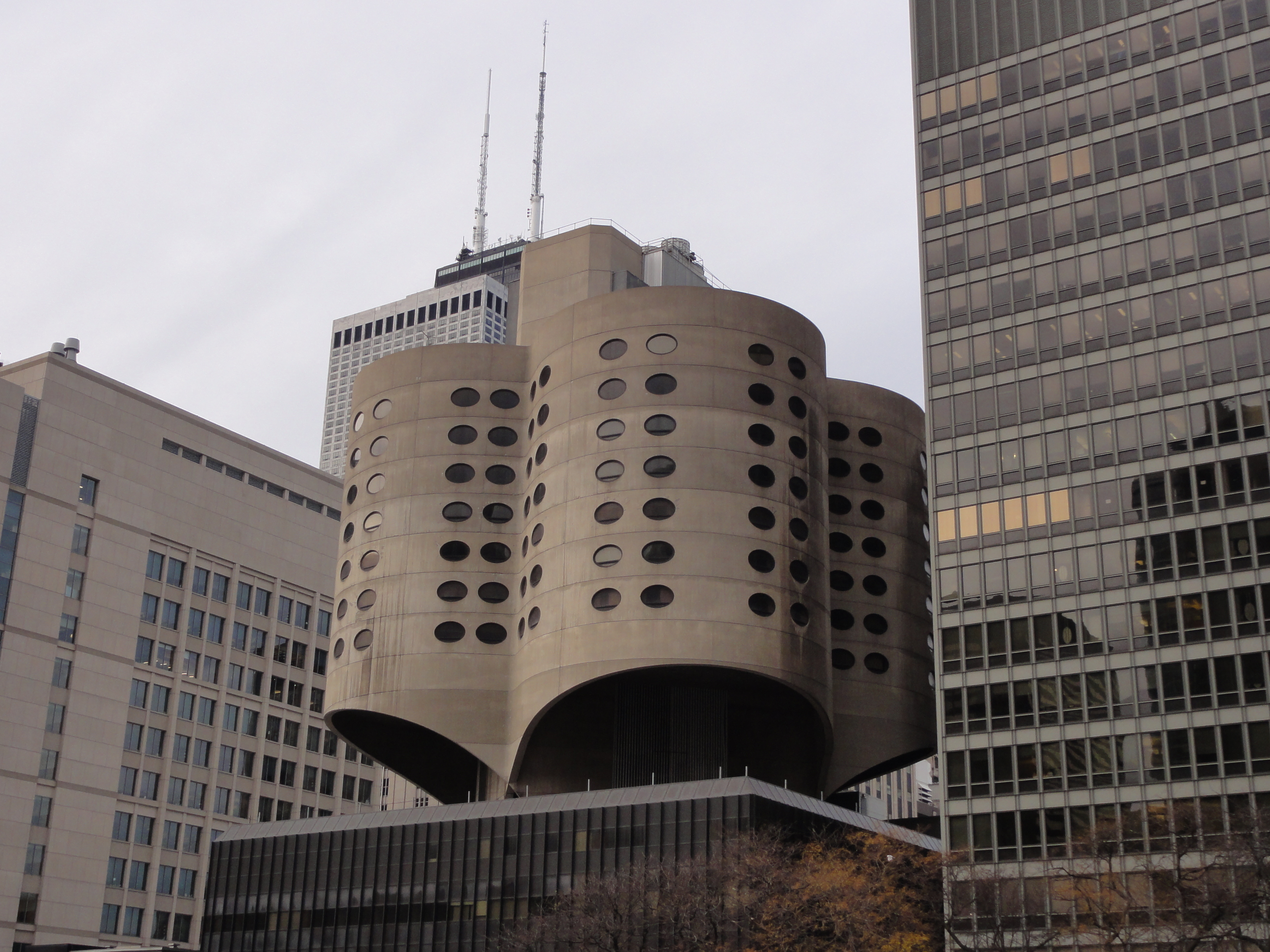
Prentice Women's Hospital Chicago
