= Genus plc =

British biotechnology company

- Headquarters in Basingstoke, UK
- Type: Public
- Traded as: LSE: GNS; FTSE 250 component
- ISIN: GB0002074580
- Industry: Biotechnology
- Founded: 1933
- Headquarters: Basingstoke, Hampshire, UK
- Key people: Iain Ferguson, Chairman; Jorgen Kokke, CEO
- Revenue: ▼£658.1 million (2026)
- Operating income: ▲£87.3 million (2026)
- Net income: ▲£285.5 million (2026)
- Website: www.genusplc.com

Genus plc is a British-based business selling elite genetics and other products manufactured using biotechnology to cattle and pig farmers. It is headquartered in Basingstoke and is a constituent of the FTSE 250 Index.

== History ==
The business has its origins in the former Breeding & Production Division of the Milk Marketing Board which was established in 1933 and broken up in 1994. In 1999 Genus acquired ABS Global, a company founded by J.R. Prentice in the US as the American Breeders Service in 1941 selling the semen of cattle. In 2005 Genus acquired, through the takeover of Sygen International plc, PIC, a company founded by six pork producers in the UK as the Pig Improvement Company in 1962.

== Operations ==
The company has three divisions:

- ABS - products for cattle
- PIC - products for pigs
- Genus R&D - management of the research and development pipeline for cattle, pigs and other species.

PIC's pedigree herds sire an estimated 30% of commercially reared pigs.
