= Frozen bovine semen =

Bovinae semen preservation method

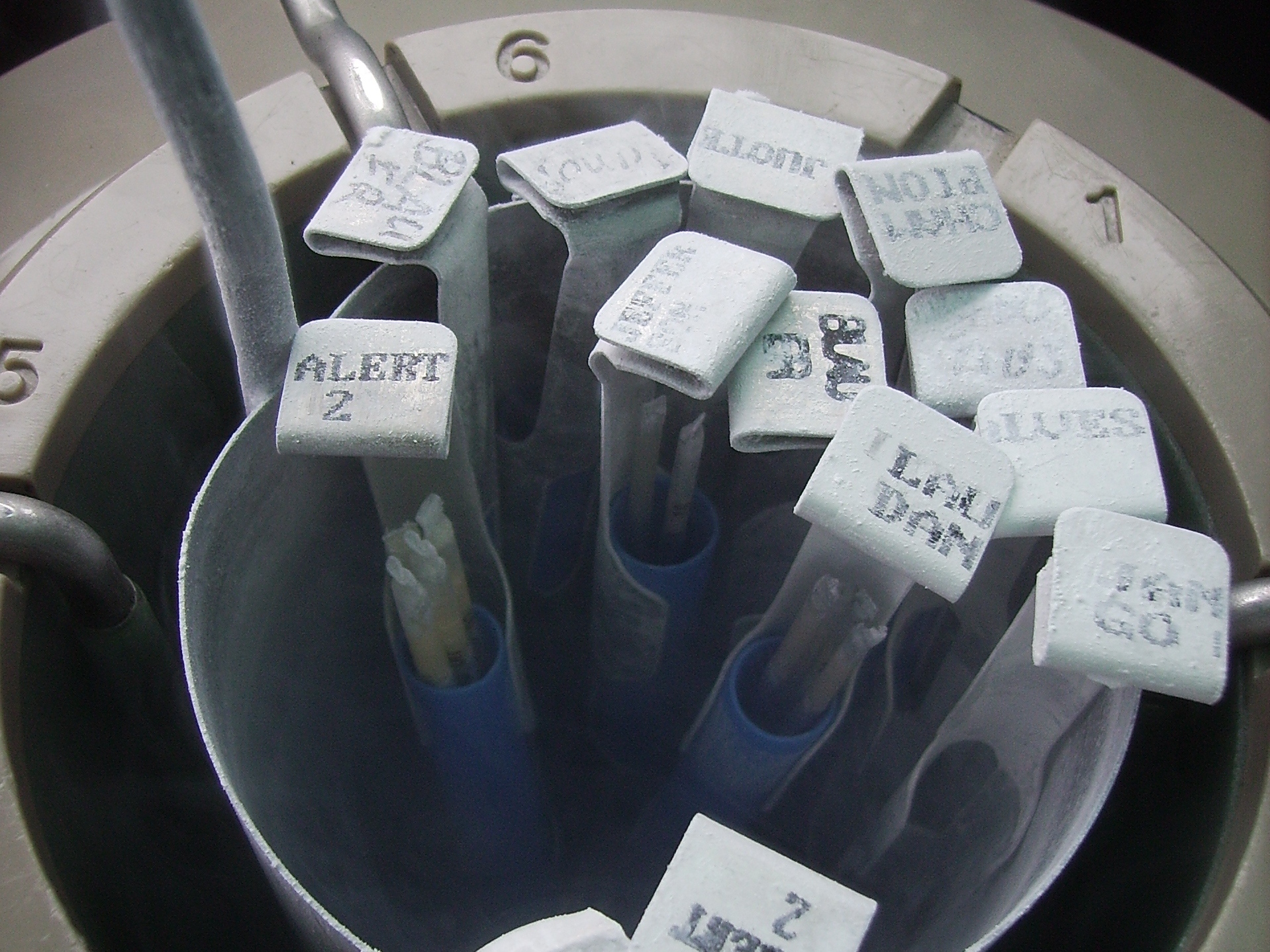
Ampules of frozen bovine semen in liquid nitrogen canister

Frozen bovine semen is a method of preserving bovine semen for future artificial insemination, even after the death of the donor.

== History ==
The early artificial insemination organizations were largely farmer-owned cooperatives. The first such cooperative in America was organized at Clinton, New Jersey, through efforts of Enos J. Perry, Extension Dairyman, New Brunswick, and began operations May 17, 1938. It began operations with 102 members and 1,050 cows enrolled.

Using frozen semen for dairy cattle has been done since the 1950s. The oldest semen believed to be in existence was from a sire named Cottonade Emmet, who was a member of the American Breeders Service sire battery in 1952. Semen was collected on Emmet in November 1952 and has been used several times to produce offspring. However, the last time any such offspring was born was in the mid-1980s. Osborndale Ivanhoe, who was probably the most famous Holstein bull of the early semen era, died in November 1963. From time to time calves will still be born from his frozen semen. Ivanhoe was a member of The Atlantic Breeder's Co-op Sire battery. His sons who have had considerable influence include, Penstate Ivanhoe Star, Provin Mtn Ivanhoe Jewel, and Fleetridge Monitor. His grandsons who have dominated the Holstein breed include Carlin-M Ivanhoe Bell, and Round Oak Rag Apple Elevation.

== Types of semen packaging ==
Semen in the early days of artificial insemination was delivered every day to technicians by bull studs as semen was not frozen at this point. It was not until the addition of glycerol to semen extenders that semen could be frozen. In those early days semen was extended by bulls stud into a type of bottle, or test tube, kept at low temperatures, and delivered to technicians usually every day. The freezing process was discovered by Christopher Polge. It was placed in containers called glass ampules, sealed, frozen in dry ice and alcohol and kept in that type of solution until it was needed for insemination. Later the liquid nitrogen refrigerator was invented by Union Carbide with money given to them by John Rockefeller Prentice, who used it exclusively for his bull stud before a number of years later giving it to the entire artificial insemination (A.I.) industry at no charge or royalty. Liquid nitrogen boils at −195.79 °C (77 K; −320 °F), which allows very little deterioration of bovine semen. The ampules were fastened to a cane which was placed inside the canister. The process of insemination involves transferring the ampule to a water/ice bath. The ampule thaws for several minutes and when opened, the semen is drawn up into a pipette.

Other semen packages that have been tried include the "Magic Wand" developed by Badger Breeders Co-op in the mid-1960s. This was a frozen pipette that contained about .75 cc of extended semen. With the use of a connector and adapter which had a syringe or rubber bulb attached it was air thawed or thawed in the cow. The frozen polybulb was another semen package that had some usage. Semen was actually placed in a plastic polybulb and frozen on canes. The polybulb was thawed, sealed end cut, and attached to a pipette. The semen expelled through the pipette. There were several size of ampules used during the early days. The 1cc ampules were used by Curtiss Breeding Service, .75cc ampules were used by Tri-State Breeders Co-op, and the .50cc ampules were almost excursively used by American Breeders Service. The .75 and 1cc ampules were usually attached six to a metal cane. The .50 cc ampules were attached eight per cane.

=== Plastic straw packaging ===
In the 1960s a straw package that utilized a plastic straw was invented by the Robert Cassou family business called IMV in France. This straw was made of PVC and had two cotton plugs with powder in between them (the "factory end") while the other end was open. Semen was sucked up into the straw and was placed directly onto a comb and semen was expelled to make an airspace. Then the straw was placed directly into a pile of PVC powder that sealed the straw. Then the straw was placed into a water bath for a period of time to plug the end sealed. Then dried with cloth towels and frozen on metal racks. After freezing the straws were placed in 95 °F water and thawed for 60 seconds before being placed into a stainless steel gun. A sheath was placed over the gun and locked into place by an o-ring. Then the cow was inseminated the usual way.

In the early 1970s an automated machine was invented by IMV. This machine would seal the straws (ultrasonically) one by one. Then several years later a machine that would fill and seal straws three at a time came out. This greatly increased processing times for bull studs. In the mid-2000s a machine that would not only fill three straws at a time but also have the capability to print the desired information on the straw, became available.

In the late 1960s, a new straw packaging method involving a fully automatic filling and sealing machine was patented by the German vet Ludwig Simmet. He founded the German company Minitüb, which is since a provider of semen straws and equipment to the industry. In the early 1970s, an automated machine was also invented by IMV. This machine would seal the straws (ultrasonically) one by one. Then several years later a machine that would fill and seal straws three at a time came out. Minitüb followed with a machine that fills and seals four by four straws. This greatly increased processing times for bull studs. In the late 1990s, Minitüb developed the first inkjet printer for straws. This machine has the capability to print the desired information on each straw, like bull and stud identification, the date of production and even barcodes. Automatic filling, sealing and printing equipment is today a standard in each bull semen processing lab.

== Semen collection ==
Bull semen can be collected by using an artificial vagina (AV), electro-ejaculator, or by manual massage.

=== Preparation of the AV ===
The most desired use is the AV. The AV is made up of a piece of heavy rubber hose about 5 cm (2.0 in) in diameter and up a 46 cm (18 in) or more (in some cases less) in length. A small screw cap attachment is fitted or drilled preferably in the middle of the housing. A piece of latex or silicone rubber (usually rough inside, but some cases smooth) then is put through the hose and pulled up at both ends. Another latex or silicone cone shaped attachment is placed on one end of the AV an held by a rubber band. On the end of the cone a glass or plastic centrifuge tube is attached usually 15ml size). Through the cap attachment water usually around 54 °C is filled until the AV is 1/2 full (temperature may vary from bull to bull). This water is between the inside rubber and the inside hose wall of the AV. A small amount of K-Y jelly or Vaseline is placed just inside on the unconed end and then it is smeared with a pipette or greasing stick. Finally in most cases and AV jacket is tied or attached onto the cone end to cover the cone and tube. This will help prevent cold shock to the semen by keeping the cone and tube warm. The collector then goes cautiously to the side of the bull when he is in mount, directs the bull's penis inside the AV by grabbing the sheath directly behind the extended penis (never touching the penis itself). The bull then ejaculates after his penis slides through the AV. The bull should be ejaculating through the AV into the cone of the AV so there is very little chance of temperature shock to the semen. After the bull has dismounted, the AV should be held in the upright position so the semen runs into the tube onto the end of the cone. Then the tube is detached and placed upright in a water bath of about 29-32 °C.

=== Preparation of the bull ===
In a commercially or Custom Stud a bull is generally brought to a collection area where there are gates or other protection areas set up. In most cases of Dairy Bulls the bull has a halter or rope inserted into his nose ring. This is so he can be led and his handler can be a safe distance away, yet have some control over the animal. In the collection area there usually is a stall or stanchion where a mount animal is tied in. A mount animal can be a steer, a cow, or even another bull. Some bulls can be rather aggressive and have no problems or issues mounting another animal. Others are rather passive and may show little or no interest in mounting. Different scenarios are used to try to entice him to mount. Such scenarios may include a different breed of steer, a different bull, or even a cow. Sometimes a bull may be wary of the individual who is approaching him to collect. In which cases a blindfold may have to be put over his eye in that side. The bull mounts and semen is able to be collected as the bull doesn't worry about what is going on.

=== Collection on farm ===
A number of bulls are not collected in commercial or stud setups. These bulls may not be good enough to enter active AI service. However the owner may only elect to use him a small amount in his own herd or perhaps a syndicate may want to control the amount of breedings or services to him. In this case the bull may be sent to a custom stud or be collected on farm. The owner may elect to only collect a few hundred to several thousand units (straws) on the bull. In most of the custom studs the semen can be stored and sent out to other breeders. In some cases where there is not a significant population of females in a particular breed, a bull may have a designated supply of semen collected and then be sent to slaughter. However, a bank or supply of his semen is kept in storage for many years, still breeding females for many years after he has departed.

While many beef bulls are collected in stud, a good share are collected on farm or in custom studs. Many of the bulls will be used in the owners' herds during beef breeding season. However, they have the genetic merit to be used in many others as well. A beef bull may only be able to service 20 to 30 head via natural service during the breeding season. He will be able to service many more during the breeding season via artificial insemination. If he becomes hurt, disabled, or even dies, he can still sire hundreds or thousands of progeny.

== See also ==
- Semen collection
