= Nathan Eddy =

American documentary filmmaker

Nathan Eddy is an American documentary filmmaker, journalist and cultural heritage activist.

== Life ==
Eddy was born and raised in Rhode Island, United States. He studied film at Northwestern University, also taking classes in journalism and architecture. In 2008, Nathan Eddy moved to Berlin, Germany. As a journalist, he writes for eWeek und InformationWeek.

== Work and activism ==
Nathan Eddy's documentaries are closely linked to his commitment to preserving endangered buildings. Eddy's first film, The Absent Column (2013), portrayed Chicago's Old Prentice Women's Hospital Building, which was threatened with demolition at the time the film was shot. Despite civic efforts to preserve it, that building was ultimately demolished.

In 2016–2017, Nathan Eddy directed the film Starship Chicago. This documentary is about the James R. Thompson Center in Chicago, which was threatened with demolition at the time. That building was designed by Helmut Jahn. Thompson Center is an important example of postmodern and high-tech architecture. The building can be considered as saved today, although the owner ultimately decided to keep the property and building himself and continue to use them. However, the decisive argument for this step was the fluctuation in real estate prices. Architect Stanley Tigerman appears in the film.

Documentary films usually don't have sequels. Not so Starship Chicago. Nathan Eddy added a second part in 2023: Starship Chicago II. This film shows the current developments around the Thompson Center since 2017.

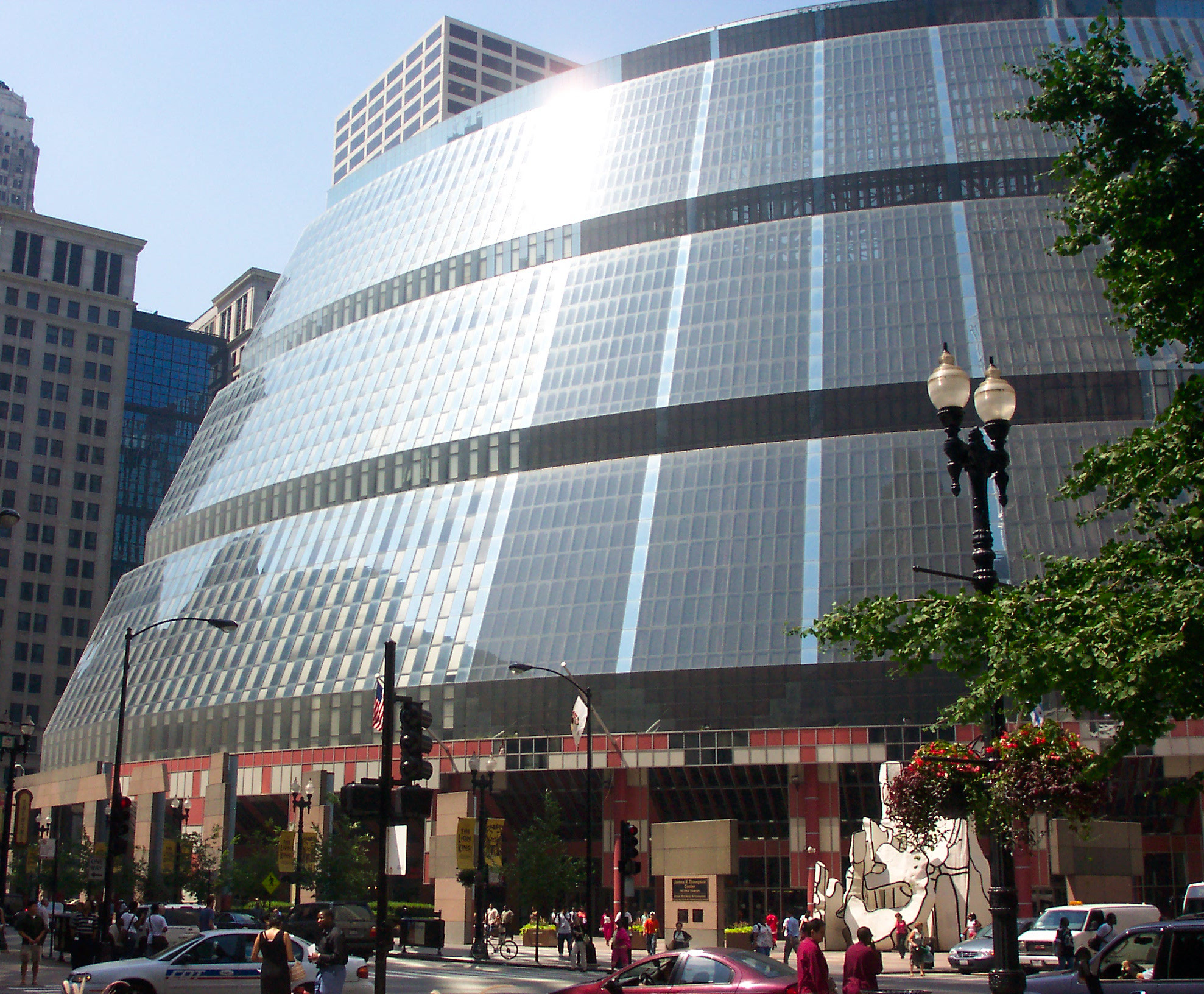
The James R. Thompson Center, subject of Nathan Eddy's short documentary film Starship Chicago

Without using a film, but with a petition, Eddy committed himself in 2017 to the preservation of the original condition of the AT&T skyscraper in New York City. Designed by Philip Johnson and John Burgee, this building is considered a milestone in postmodern architecture. Conversions planned by Snøhetta architects would have significantly changed the character of the building. Eddy called for protests against the conversion measures and was able to successfully ensure that the original character of the house is retained in future modernizations. Among others, the architect Robert A. M. Stern took part in the protest actions to preserve it.

Eddy's film Battleship Berlin (2021) deals with the fate of two buildings owned by the Charité medical center in Berlin-Steglitz: the Institute for Hygiene and Environmental Medicine (Hygiene Institute) and the Research Institutes for Experimental Medicine (Mouse Bunker). This film project, too, promotes appreciation for the buildings, with the ultimate goal of saving them from demolition. During the work on the film, the institute of hygiene was listed as a cultural heritage site. In the ongoing debate about the demolition of the Mouse Bunker, the film contributed to public perception of the building. Among others, the architect Arno Brandlhuber, art dealer Johann König, the politician Katalin Gennburg, the head of the Berlin state office for cultural heritage management Christoph Rauhut, the architect Gunnar Klack and the art historian Felix Torkar appear in the film. The film was shown in the film program of the Chicago Architecture Biennale, among others.

In response to Helmut Jahn's death in 2021, Eddy made the short film Helmut Jahn: In a Flash. Footage shot in 2016 for the film Starship Chicago included a lengthy interview with Jahn. From this interview Eddy edited a short film in memory of the late architect.

== Awards ==
- Starship Chicago was awarded the Docomomo Advocacy Award of Excellence 2018.
