= Research Institutes for Experimental Medicine =

Brutalist structure

- Forschungseinrichtung für experimentelle Medizin
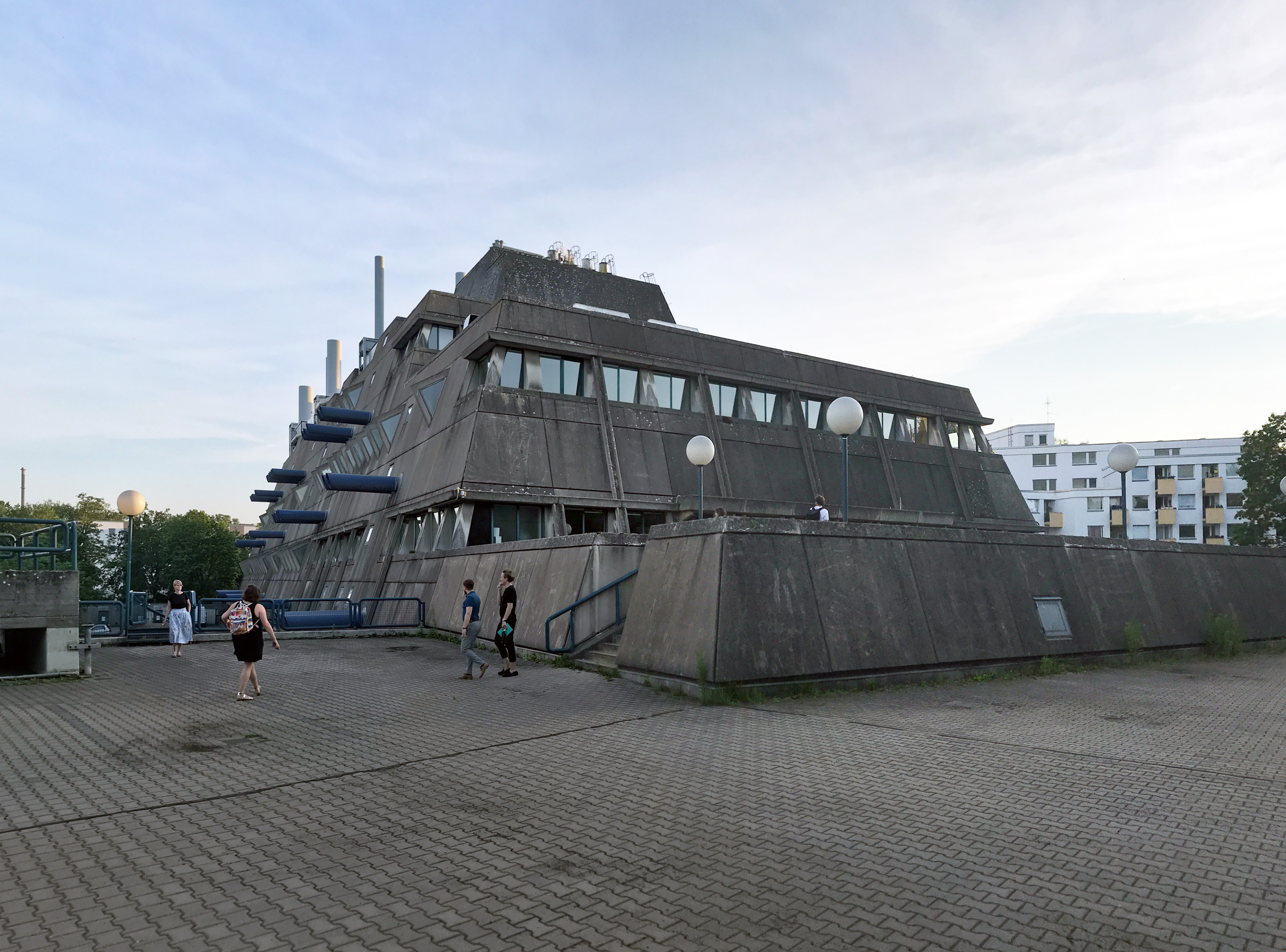
- Mouse Bunker in 2019
- Interactive map of the Research Institutes for Experimental Medicine area
- Former names: Central Animal Laboratories of the Free University of Berlin, Zentrale Tierlaboratorien der Freien Universität Berlin
- Alternative names: Mäusebunker, Mouse Bunker

General information
- Status: Completed
- Type: Scientific research, animal experimentation, animal breeding
- Architectural style: Brutalism
- Location: Lichterfelde (Berlin), Berlin, Germany, Krahmerstraße 6
- Coordinates: 52°26′12.4″N 13°19′1.47″E
- Current tenants: Charité
- Construction started: 1971
- Completed: 1981

Technical details
- Floor count: 9

Design and construction
- Architects: Gerd Hänska, Kurt Schmersow, Magdalena Hänska

The Research Institutes for Experimental Medicine are a research facility in Berlin, Germany. This building is commonly known as Mouse Bunker, or Mäusebunker in German. Until 2003, its official name was Central Animal Laboratories of the Free University of Berlin.

== Planning and Construction ==
This facility was built for the purpose of live animal testing. Animals for experimentation were bred in the facility too, to provide sterile conditions and a maximum amount of control. It is located in close proximity to the Benjamin Franklin Medical Center and the Institute for Hygiene and Microbiology. These three facilities were erected to provide a high performing infrastructure for the development and application of new medicine and vaccines.

The Mouse Bunker's original designers are husband and wife Gerd Hänska and Magdalena Hänska. They started the design between 1965 and 1967. Construction began in 1971. By that time, Gerd and Magdalena Hänska were working separately and only Gerd Hänska continued planning the Mouse Bunker. Detailed planning and construction was done by Gerd Hänska and Kurt Schmersow between 1971 and 1981.

== Reception ==
The building has been viewed as controversial from its very beginning. The sinister design and the use for animal testing were not popular with the general public. Over the years it has become more and more popular among friends of brutalist architecture. Numerous international publications have featured Mouse Bunker as a prominent example of brutalist architecture in Germany.

After the current owner Charité announced plans for demolition, public awareness has increased even more. A petition to save the building was initiated by architect Gunnar Klack and art historian Felix Torkar in 2020. The discussion about the future of the Mouse Bunker was featured in international publications. The Mouse Bunker has been referenced in connection to other international examples of brutalist buildings and their respective future perspectives – for example the Tel Aviv central bus station in Israel or the Vilnius Palace of Concerts and Sports in Lithuania.

Filmmaker Nathan Eddy shot the documentary Battleship Berlin, which deals with the Research Institutes for Experimental Medicine and the neighboring Institute for Hygiene and Microbiology. After a years long debate, the building was finally listed as a cultural heritage site in May 2023.

== See also ==
- List of Brutalist structures
