= Prentice Women's Hospital =

- Northwestern Medicine

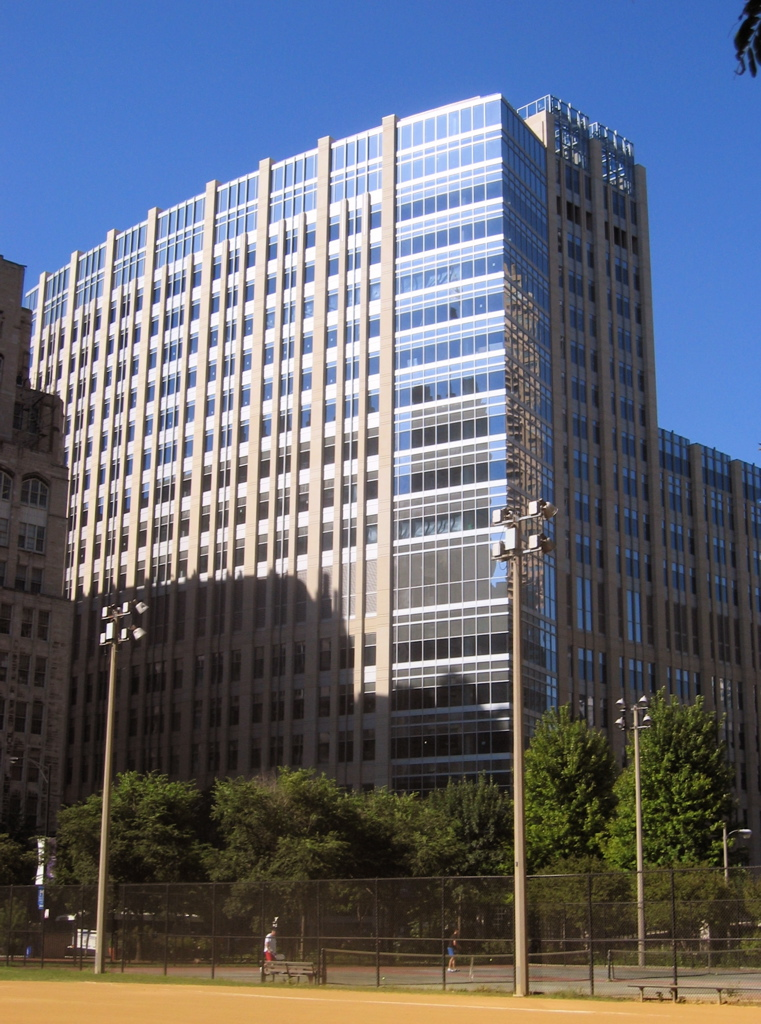
- The Prentice Women's Hospital building, Chicago, Illinois

Geography
- Location: 250 East Superior Street, Chicago, Illinois, United States
- Coordinates: 41.89624780°N 87.62072500°W

Organization
- Type: Specialist
- Affiliated university: Feinberg School of Medicine

Services
- Emergency department: Yes
- Beds: 256
- Speciality: obstetric, gynecological, and neonatal care

History
- Opened: Original: 1975; Current: 2007

Links
- Website: www.nm.org/locations/prentice-womens-hospital
- Lists: Hospitals in Illinois

Prentice Women's Hospital is an acute care specialty hospital in Chicago, United States, located adjacent to both Northwestern Memorial Hospital and Lurie Children's Hospital. It provides tertiary-level obstetric, gynecological, and neonatal care. Prentice Women's Hospital is a member of Northwestern Medicine and serves as a teaching hospital for the Northwestern University's Feinberg School of Medicine. The hospital has 256 beds, with 86 AAP verified level III neonatal intensive care unit beds, 32 labor and delivery beds, 86 healthy bassinets, and 10 operating rooms. The hospital is directly attached to the Lurie Children's Hospital via skybridge because Lurie physicians provide care on Prentice's neonatal intensive care units.

== History ==
=== Original building ===
Bertrand Goldberg began design in 1971, after the consolidation of Passavant Deaconess Hospital and Wesley Hospital. It was named for Abra “Abbie” Cantrill Prentice (1912-1972), the wife of John Rockefeller Prentice and mother of Abra Prentice Wilkin. It was opened in 1975.

The building was vacated in 2011 after serving as a hospital until the new Prentice Women's Hospital opened nearby at 250 East Superior Street in 2007. Northwestern University announced plans to demolish it and replace it with a medical research facility. Preservationists and prominent architects (including at least 6 Pritzker Prize winners) had called on Northwestern and the City of Chicago to save the building, appealing to Chicago's "global reputation as a nurturer of bold and innovative architecture". Jeanne Gang presented a reuse design incorporating the building into a skyscraper.

In the debate over the building's planned demolition, Northwestern argued that the site was needed for medical research on heart disease, cancer, and children's diseases. Preservationists responded that Northwestern Memorial Hospital owns a two-square-block piece of vacant land directly across the street from Prentice, and within a potential skybridge's reach from the university's existing research building.

=== Current building ===
The new Prentice Women's Hospital opened on October 20, 2007, on the hospital's northern campus border along Superior Street. This facility would replace the old Prentice Women's Hospital Building which later was demolished in September 2014 for new campus construction. The new hospital doubled the size of the previous women's hospital at 947,000 square feet, with one of the largest Neonatal Intensive Care Units in the country.

== Awards ==
In the 2005-06 U.S. News & World Report: Best Hospital rankings, Prentice Women's Hospital was rated as the #32 best hospital in the United States in the field of gynecology.

In the 2018-19 U.S. News & World Report rankings, Prentice Women's was rated as the #13 best hospital in the United States in the field of gynecology and #11 best hospital in neonatology (ranked with Lurie Children's).

In 2021, the hospital received a Women's Choice Award as a "Best Hospital" in the area of obstetrics (ranked with Northwestern Memorial).

== See also ==
- Northwestern University
- Feinberg School of Medicine
- Northwestern Memorial Hospital
- Lurie Children's Hospital
