= RORA Elevation =

Holstein-Friesian bull

- Bull name: Round Oak Rag Apple Elevation
- Sire: Tidy Burke Elevation
- Dam: Round Oak Ivanhoe Eve
- Grandsire: Wis Burke Ideal
- Damsire: Osborndale Ivanhoe
- Country: United States
- Breeder: Ronald Hope
- Owner: Select Sires, Inc
- updated: September 11, 2009

Round Oak Rag Apple Elevation (born 1965, often abbreviated RORA Elevation), was one of the most influential artificial insemination Holstein/Friesian bulls of the twentieth century. Elevation was named bull of the century by the Holstein International Association in 1999. Elevation was sired by Tidy Burke Elevation, a highly inbred bull from the Burke bloodline. His dam, Round Oak Ivanhoe Eve, was sired by the famous 1950's bull Osborndale Ivanhoe. Elevation was born in Virginia, bred by Ronald Hope, and was later owned by the artificial insemination company Select Sires. Elevation had many famous sons, including Sweet-Haven Tradition, Rockalli Son of Bova, Marshfield Elevation Tony, Ocean-View Sexation and Straight-Pine Elevation Pete. In Canada, he had Hanoverhill Starbuck, an influential sire of sons worldwide. As of April 2009, Elevation is considered to be the bull with most actual descendants in the United States, by the Sire Summaries April 2009, of the Holstein Association.

== Family tree ==
| USA 1491007 100%-NA Round Oak Rag Apple Elevation 7HO00058 August 30, 1965 TV TL BT | USA 1271810 100%-NA Tidy Burke Elevation 1HO00079 March 23, 1955 TV BT | USA 1013415 100%-NA Wis Burke Ideal May 20, 1947 BT |
| Round Oak Ivanhoe Eve July 14, 1962 BT | USA 4855614 100%-NA Round Oak Nettie Emaline January 7, 1959 | USA 3757944 100%-NA Round Oak Millie Elizabeth November 16, 1953 |

== Elevation's impact ==
Elevation had an influence worldwide through his sons, grandsons and great-grandsons. Elevation came from a combination of the Rag Apple Bloodline with the Burke bloodline, which came to have a good result. These are a few of his actual descendants:

Hanoverhill Starbuck - Well known for his famous sons and grandsons, Starbuck has had many descendants worldwide. In Canada, he had Madawaska Aerostar, Hanoverhill Raider, Duregal Astre Starbuck, Ronnybrook Prelude and Browndale Stardust. In the United States, he had the superstar in conformation, Marcrest Encore, famous for his World Dairy Expo Supreme Champion daughter, Tri-Day Ashlyn (EX-96). In France, he had Besne Buck and his famous grandson, Fatal. In Italy, came Sabbiona Bookie, as well as other sons in different parts of the world.

Influence of Starbuck's sons

Madawaska Aerostar – Aerostar became one of the first Starbuck sons to be proofed, and one of the first to sell one million doses of frozen semen. His sons in Canada were Maughlin Storm and the Millionaire Sires Startmore Rudolph and Oliveholme Aeroline. In the US, he had Parker Aero Wade and Ladys-Manor Winchester. In Great-Britain, he became successful for the famous brood cow, Condon Aero Sharon (EX-91) dam of Picston Shaker, and the most successful 2nd crop sire of the 21st century: Picston Shottle.

Hanoverhill Raider – Raider was successful with his son, Comestar Lee, sire of the famous Ashlyn son, EK-Oseeana Aspen, Idee Lustre's son, Wedgwood Laramie and Shoremar S Alicia's son, BKB Affirmed. Lee is also known for his grandson in the US, Den-K Marshall LL Laurin.

Duregal Astre Starbuck – Astre had a successful descendence in his two sons Tcet Lyster, and a Red carrier son, STBVQ Rubens. Lyster was born from a Starbuck son and his maternal grandfather was also a Starbuck son. Rubens was born from a Starbuck son and his dam was sired by Starbuck, meaning both bulls came from an inbreeding of Starbuck.

Ronnybrook Prelude – Prelude was the best bull in Canada from 1993–1994, but his proof later crashed. His sons proofed to be better than Prelude, such as Duncan Progress in the US, Comestar Outside in Canada, and Carol Prelude Mtoto in Italy. Windy-Knoll-View Pronto and Picston Shottle are two of the grandsons of Prelude.

Browndale Stardust – Known for his strength and type, Stardust was the sire of the famous Blackrose son, Indianhead Red-Marker, and later sire of a red holstein bull, Carrousel Distrigene-Red. Stardust is still one of the Body composite top 50 according to the Sire Summaries April 2008.

Marcrest Encore-A High Type bull who has a World Dairy Expo champion daughter Tri-Day Ashlyn (EX-96). His two famous sons, Regancrest Dundee and Indianhead Encounter whose dams are the famous Snow-N Denises Dellia and Stookey-Elm Park Blackrose.

250 Besne Buck-A French Starbuck son who was the sire of Jocko Besn, the bull that has sired more than 50% of French holstein cattle and at 14 years of age is still alive.

Sabbiona Bookie – An Italian Starbuck son who was the sire of Boss Iron, a German born bull proven in Italy. He is still the highest type bull proven in Italy, and has 2 AI sons: Alpag Iron Active and Pine-Shelter Logan Iron.

Descendants of Madawaska Aerostar

Maughlin Storm – Famous known for a sire of sons, he sired Pursuit September Storm RC, son of many red bulls. He also sired Comestar Stormatic, who already has 2 sons within the American TPI (As of August 2008) Gen-Mark Stormatic Sanchez and Golden-Oaks St Alexander. He is also the sire of 2 other red carrier bulls: Granduc Tribute and Ladino Park Talent. In the US, he has Canyon-Breeze Storm Atom, another Storm son. His most famous daughter, Braedale Baler Twine, was chosen Global Cow of the Year 2008 by the Holstein International, dam of the successful second-crop sire Braedale Goldwyn. He has also other grandsons such as Braedale Bambam and Magor Bolivia Allen in Hungary.

Startmore Rudolph – Ranked among the Top in the LPI and TPI, Rudolph is one of the 9 Millionaire Sires of the Semex Alliance (Surpassed the sum of 1 million doses of semen.) He has also a famous Canadian son, Clabrett-I HH Champion, that also surpassed 1 million doses. His German son, Ramos, is among in the top-100 of the TPI list. His most famous daughter, Windy-Knoll-View Promis (EX-95), has already sons, one of them Windy-Knoll-View Pronto. Other grandsons are R-E-W Buckeye and Regancrest-HHF Marcus.

Oliveholme Aeroline – This Aerostar son also surpassed the 1 million doses, but was not very influential as a sire of sons. His most famous son has probably been Braedale Freelance. Still, he is an important Aerostar son of the Semex Alliance.

Parker Aero Wade – An Aerostar son born in the US, Wade was the sire of Altagen-I Merchant an influential sire of sons who recently died. Merchant's sons are just arriving to the proofs, one of them, Ked Merchant Mickey. He is also the maternal great-grandson of Mr Regancrest Dex.

Ladys-Manor Winchester-Born in the US, Winchester is the maternal great grandson of Rauscher Marshall Master and Glen-Valley BW Captain. He did not succeed as a sire of sons, but had a few grandsons.

Descendants of Maughlin Storm

Comestar Stormatic-Stormatic was a leading Canadian bull in the LPI, and is currently being used as a sire of sons. His most important sons currently in the United States are Gen-Mark Stormatic Sanchez and Golden-Oaks ST Alexander. His maternal grandmother is Comestar Laurie Sheik, a famous Canadian brood-cow and one of the most important in the breed.

Pursuit September Storm RC-A red-carrier son of Storm, September is one of the most used bulls as a sire of sons in the red and white holsteins. His most famous sons (without proof) is Scientific SS Deuce RC. His most famous son with proof is Hurtgen-View Reality-Red, who is currently on the Top 100-TPI of the January 2009 Sire Summaries. He comes from the family of Glen-Drummond Shower RC.

Granduc Tribute RC – Another red-carrier Storm son, he is most famous for his Red daughter Rosedale-L Trudy EX-90. Tribute comes from the family of A Cloverlands Skylar Cherry-Red.

Ladino Park Talent RC – The third and last red-carrier son from Storm, he is being widely used as sire of sons. His most famous sons (without proof) are Scientific Debonair-Red and Fradon Jet-Red. Talent has such a popular demand, that the Semex Alliance sells a clone to Latin American countries. Talent comes from the family of Stookey-Elm Park Blackrose (EX-96).

Canyon-Breeze Storm Atom – A Storm son born in the US, Canyon is one of the few Storm sons sampled in the US with success. Canyon comes from the family of Claney WC Mark Abigail (EX-91).

Descendants of Startmore Rudolph

Calbrett-I HH Champion – Probably one of the most successful of the Rudolph sons, Champion is currently one of the most used sire of sons. In his sons there is Genos Gavor (of the Czech Republic), Penn-England Temptation and Regancrest Chilton. Champion surpassed the production of 1 million doses of semen in 2007.

Descendants of Parker Aero Wade

Altagen-I Merchant – Merchant is probably one of the few Wade sons that was sampled. Merchant, who died only recently, has already one son: Ked Merchant Mickey, currently sampled at Select Sires.

Descendants of Hanoverhill Raider: Comestar Lee – Lee is one of the nine Millionaire Sires of the Semex Alliance. Lee has sampled three very famous sons: EK-Oseeana Aspen (out of Tri-Day Ashlyn EX-96), BKB Affirmed (Out of Shoremar S Alicia EX-97) and Wedgwood Laramie (out of Idee Lustre EX-95). Laramie was classified EX-96, the second highest scored bull in Canada who is the youngest sire in history to score EX-96. Lee is also the maternal grandsire of Thurlane James Rose (EX-97). This cow was Supreme champion at the World Dairy Expo in the United States and in the Royal Winter Fair in Canada. According to the Holstein International edition of May 2005, Lee is the second highest producer of semen in history only after Skalsumer Sunny-Boy.

Descendants of Duregal Astre Starbuck: STBVQ Rubens RC – Rubens, one of the most used red-carrier bulls of the twentieth century, is the sire of 2 very important red show cows. Lavender Ruby Redrose-Red (EX-96) was Supreme Champion of the World Dairy Expo in 2005. Redrose has sampled many red sons during her career. The other one is Scarlet-Summer RB Gwendelyn EX-95 who was the 2010 Holstein USA Star of the Breed. Rubens also has many red sons and probably the best one currently is Valleyriver Ruben Redman-Red. Rubens comes from the family of C Glenridge Citation Roxy (EX-97) nominated twice as Queen of the Breed by The Holstein World.

TCET Lyster – A high type bull that produced many show cows is Lyster. His most famous daughter is currently Blondin Lyster Beauty. Lyster hasn't succeeded as a sire of sons, but has produced many show cows.

Descendants of Ronnybrook Prelude: Comestar Outside – Outside is also one of the 9 Millionaire Sires of Semex, and belongs to the family of Comestar Laurie Sheik. Outside has been popularly known as a successful sire of sons like Windy-Knoll-View Pronto, England-Ammon Million, Ked Outside Jeeves, Mr Million Mega-Man, Solid-Gold Colby and many others. Outside has a maternal grandson influence with Andacres Morty Onward. Outside's most famous daughter is Penlow Georgette Outside (EX-95), that has currently many sons in sampling.

Duncan Progress – Progress didn't succeed as a sire of sons, but produced many show cows. His most famous daughter is Kaboo Progress Candie (EX-94).

Carol Prelude Mtoto – An Italian bull, Mtoto succeeded being a sire of sons, specially with his British son, Picston Shottle. Mtoto has also succeeded as a maternal grandfather, with Emerald-Acre-Sa T-Baxter, Nor-Bert Calypso and Pine-Shelter Laramee Mor. Mtoto's most famous daughter is Nordic-Haven Mto Calico, dam of Nor-Bert Calypso.

Descendants of Carol Prelude Mtoto

Picston Shottle – Shottle debuted in January 2008 as the number one bull in the United States TPI and in April 2008 as the number one bull in type. He then rose in January 2009 debuted as the number one in the Canadian LPI and also the number one in conformation. After the success of Shottle he is the most widely used sire of sons currently. His most famous daughters are Regancrest Breya, Misty-Springs Shottle Silk and Page House Shottle Noni.

Descendants of Browndale Stardust: Indianhead Red-Marker RC – Red Marker sired many famous show cows, but didn't have many sons, mainly because of his extremely low milk. His most famous son is Carrousel Distrigene-Red, son of Stellbro Renita Ranger-Red.

Descendants of Marcrest Encore: Regancrest Dundee – Dundee is probably the most well-known son of Encore, since he comes from Snow-N Denises Dellia EX-95, which was also the dam of other great bulls. Dundee was the Bull that had the most daughters in the 2008 Royal Winter Fair. Dying in June 2009, Dundee is one of the bulls that many of his sons will be proofed in 2010.

Descendants of Besne Buck: Jocko Besn – The famous French bull in the world today, Jocko has sold more than 1.5 million doses of semen, and could surpass Skalsumer Sunny Boy and become the world's highest sold bull in history. He has several sons in France and in the US. His maternal grandsire is Southwind Bell-Of-Bar Lee who also passed the milestone of 1 million doses in 1997.

== See also ==
- Frozen bovine semen
