= Northwestern Memorial Hospital =

Hospital in Chicago, Illinois, US

- Northwestern Medicine

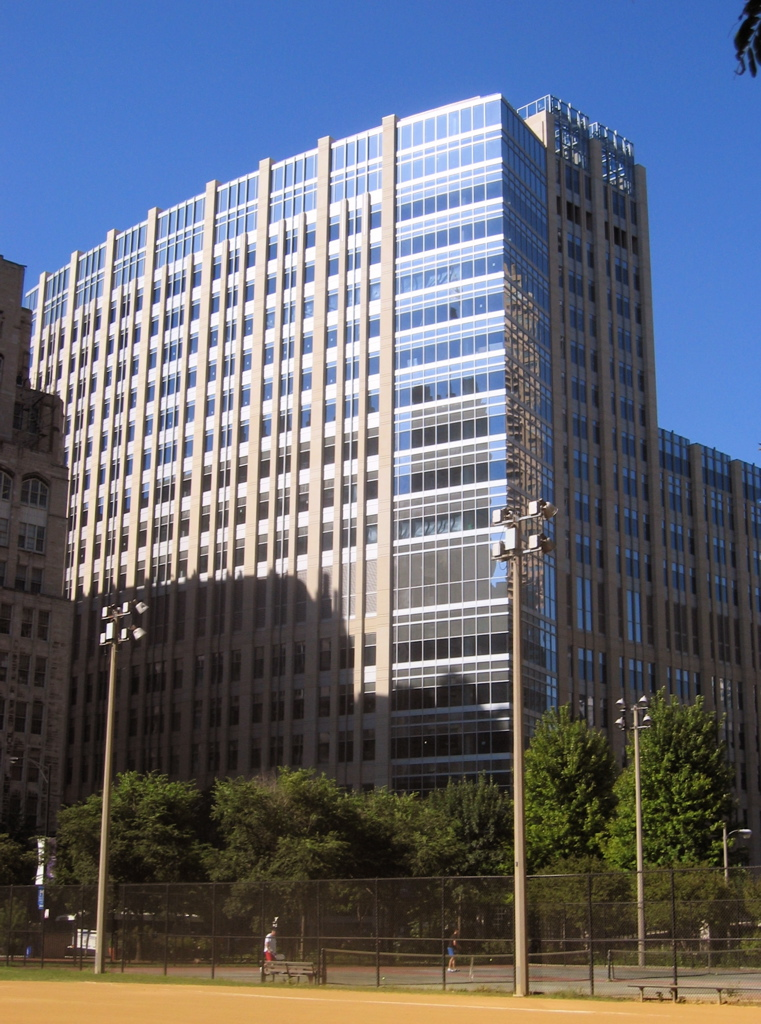
- Prentice Women's Hospital, a building of Northwestern Memorial Hospital

Geography
- Location: 251 East Huron Street, Chicago, Illinois, United States
- Coordinates: 41°53′41″N 87°37′19″W

Organization
- Type: Inpatient and outpatient, specialty and primary care, teaching
- Affiliated university: Northwestern University; Feinberg School of Medicine

Services
- Emergency department: Level I Trauma Center
- Beds: 894

Helipads
- Helipad: No

History
- Former names: Passavant Memorial Hospital; Wesley Memorial Hospital
- Founded: September 1, 1972; 53 years ago

Links
- Website: nm.org
- Lists: Hospitals in Illinois

Northwestern Memorial Hospital (NMH) is an academic medical center located on Northwestern University's Chicago campus in Streeterville, Chicago, Illinois. It is the flagship campus for Northwestern Medicine and the primary teaching hospital for the Northwestern University Feinberg School of Medicine. Affiliated institutions also located on campus include the Lurie Children's Hospital with Level I pediatric trauma care and the Shirley Ryan AbilityLab, a leader in physical medicine and rehabilitation.

In 2022, U.S. News & World Report ranked Northwestern Memorial as the top hospital in both Chicago and Illinois for the eleventh consecutive year and #9 in the nation. In the same report, Northwestern Memorial is nationally ranked in 11 adult specialties including #5 in Neurology & Neurosurgery.

== History ==
=== Origins ===
Northwestern Memorial Hospital's roots date back to 1865 when the then Deaconess Hospital of Chicago was established by local reverend William A. Passavant Sr. and Lucy Rider Meyer of the Chicago Training School (later Garrett Theological Seminary), with a capacity of 15 beds. In the first year, the hospital had treated 75 patients, with most receiving care free-of-charge. A few years later in 1871, Deaconess Hospital was destroyed in the Great Chicago Fire, and Passavant could not afford the cost of a rebuild.

In 1885, after 14 years without an area hospital, Passavant opened a new hospital known as "Emergency Hospital" on Superior Street to better treat emergencies from the area.

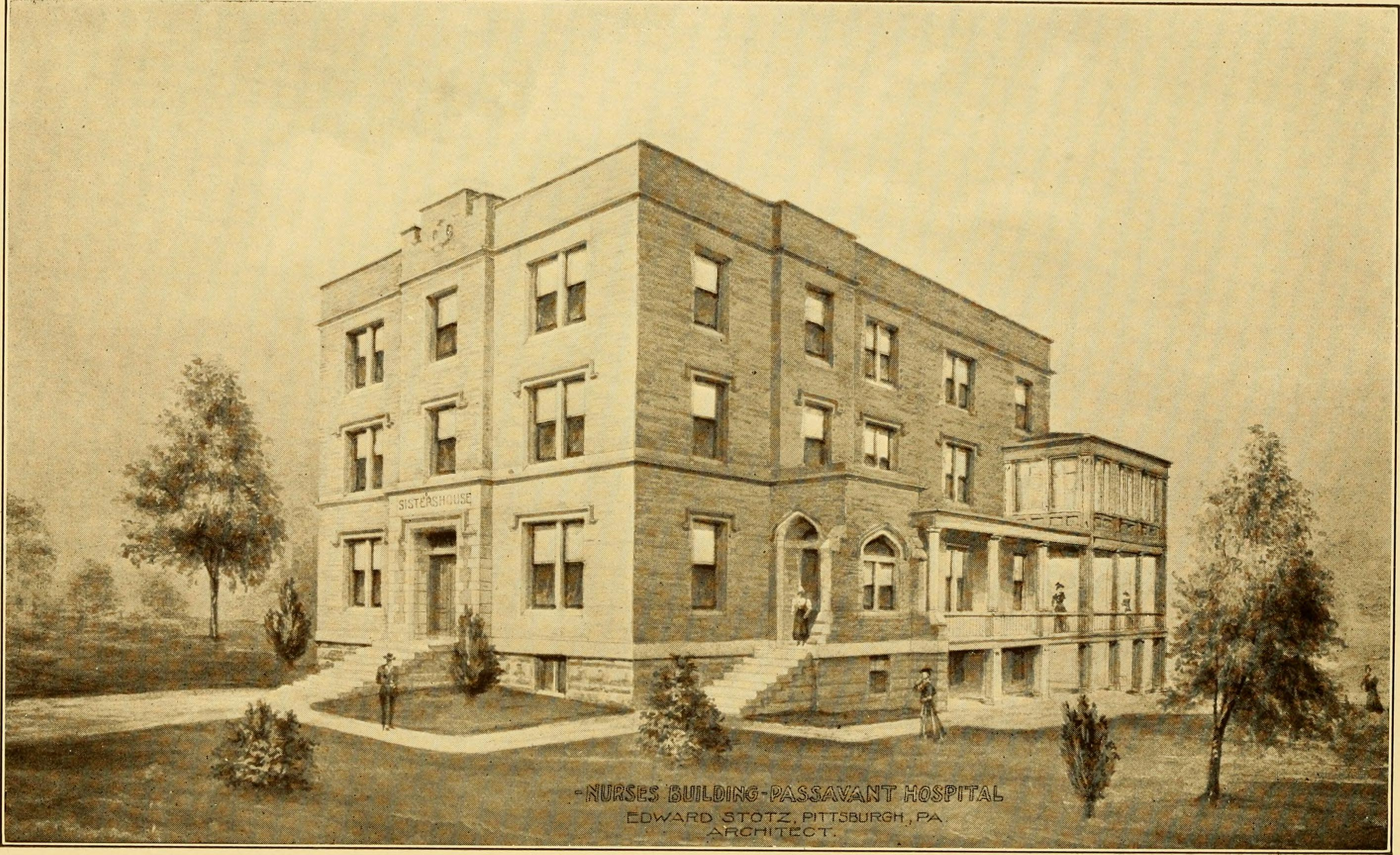
The original "Deaconess Hospital" before the Great Fire

Wesley Hospital was founded in 1888 on Dearborn Street in Chicago. In 1890, at Northwestern's request, Wesley Hospital agreed to move to the area around Northwestern University's Medical School and establish a preliminary affiliation to train doctors at Northwestern.

In 1897, a group of local women formed the Passavant's Woman's Aid Society to raise money for the continued operation of the hospital. The society was later renamed to the "Woman's Board of Northwestern Memorial Hospital" after the merger between Passavant and Wesley. The society is now one of Chicago's oldest charities.

In 1901, both Passavant Memorial Hospital and Wesley Hospital completed building expansion and renovation projects, expanding patient capacity to 65 and 181 beds, respectively.

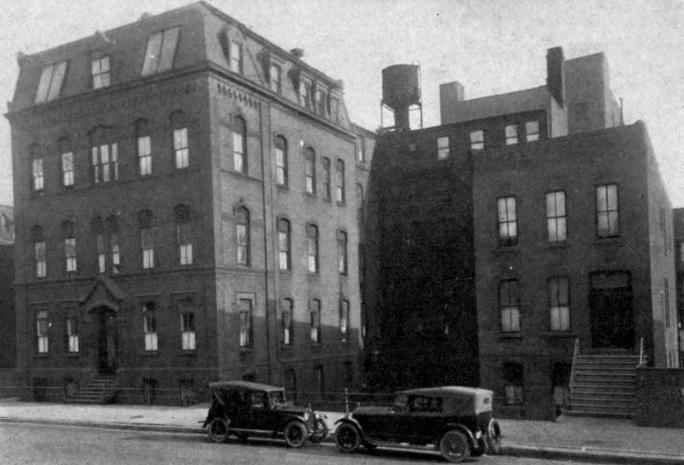
Passavant Memorial Hospital at 149 West Superior Street in 1922

In 1914, local philanthropist James Deering made a $1 million donation to Wesley Memorial Hospital to help formalize the hospital's affiliation with Northwestern University Medical School and to support the care for those that could not afford.

In 1917, doctors and nurses from Wesley and Passavant enlisted to help treat victims of World War I with many serving in France with other Northwestern University staff at a base hospital.

In 1924, it was announced that Wesley would move to the north side campus adjacent to Northwestern University for a stronger affiliation, but funding for construction was delayed until the 1930s. Northwestern University also contacted Passavant Memorial Hospital to offer an affiliation and a land plot near the school for a new hospital, which later began operation in 1929.

In 1925, Passavant Memorial Hospital signed an affiliation with Northwestern University, allowing medical students from Northwestern to learn at the hospital. Additionally, Passavant administration decided to suspend patient care in order to begin fundraising for a new, larger hospital. Four years later, in 1929 Passavant Memorial opened their new 325-bed hospital building on 303 East Superior Street across from their affiliate, Northwestern University Medical School.

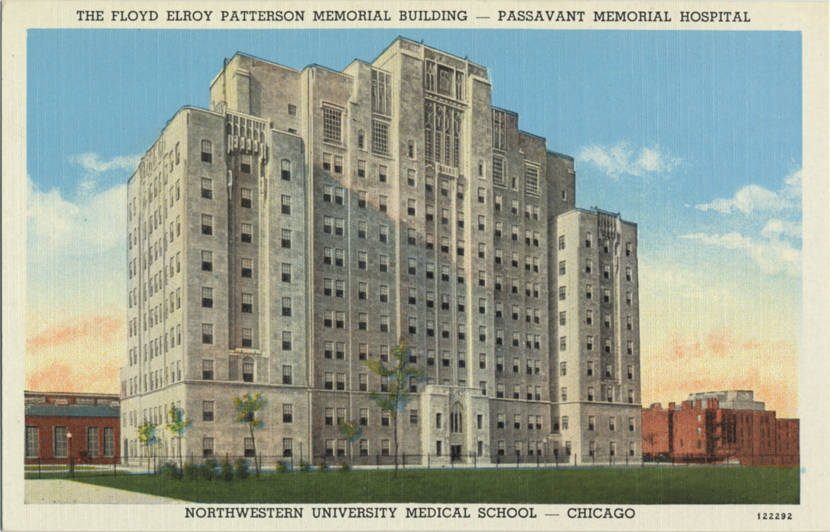
The Passavant Memorial Hospital located adjacent to Northwestern University Medical School

In 1937, local philanthropist and steel mogul George Herbert Jones donated $1 million for construction of a new high-rise building to house Wesley Memorial Hospital. Four years later, in 1941 the new Wesley Memorial Hospital, opened at 250 East Superior Street.

Wesley Memorial Hospital's new hospital was officially completed in 1941, and over the next thirty years, the two institutions began to form bonds because they were both the primary hospitals for Northwestern Medicine. In 1942, doctors and nurses from both Passavant Memorial and Wesley were once again enlisted to help tender aid to soldiers during World War II. In June 1948, hospital founder William A. Passavant Sr. died, triggering a rename to Passavant Memorial Hospital to honor and memorialize Passavant's life.

In 1954, the former Chicago Memorial Hospital finalized a merger with Wesley Hospital which triggered a rename to Chicago Wesley Memorial Hospital; the two hospitals merged their boards, endowment funds and medical staff as a part of the new agreement. Four years later, Passavant Memorial Hospital finished construction on their new east pavilion, bringing the total capacity of the merged hospital to 350 beds. In 1959, Wesley Memorial Hospital completed the Ruth Jones Allison Pavilion, adding space for additional inpatient beds and upgraded lab space.

Due to their proximity and affiliation with Northwestern, the hospitals began working together on a number of clinical services and teaching programs, laying the groundwork for a future merger. The merger plans were accelerated when a new partnership was formed between Northwestern, Wesley Memorial, and Passavant Memorial Hospital. A precursor to a full merger, Passavant and Wesley began looking into collaborative efforts in multi-hospital services and shared inpatient clinical programs.

In 1968, planning and fundraising commenced for a proposed joint women's hospital (Prentice Women's Hospital) that was to be controlled by Northwestern, Wesley Memorial, and Passavant Memorial Hospital.

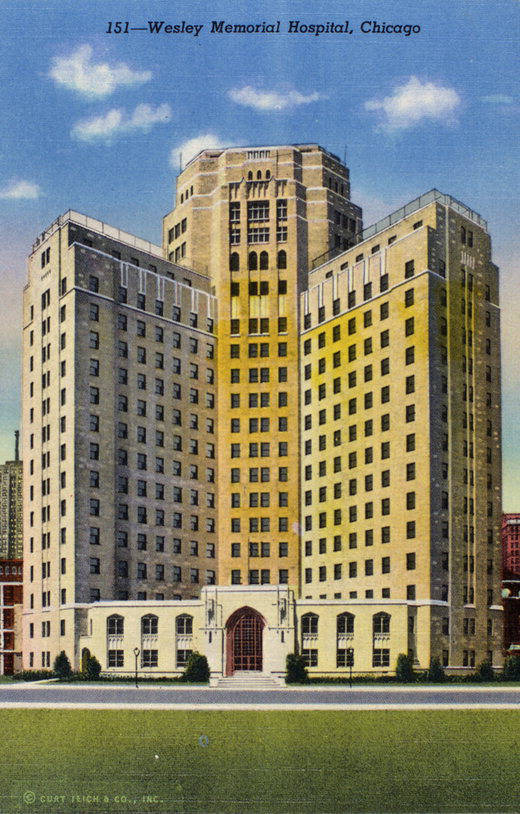
Wesley Memorial Hospital on Northwestern's campus, pictured in 1941

In 1971, staff from Passavant Memorial and Wesley Memorial gained admitting and hospital privileges at both hospitals; at the time, hospital leadership denied this was a precursor to a merger, but the two hospitals voted to investigate the possibility in May 1972 and had already announced the consolidation of their two nursing schools.

=== Merger ===
On September 1, 1972, Passavant Memorial Hospital and Wesley Memorial Hospital officially merged to become Northwestern Memorial Hospital. The 1,000-bed hospital became one of the largest private nonprofit healthcare institutions in the Chicago and the Midwest region; it was the sixth-largest private hospital in the United States with the merger.

In 1975, the Prentice Women's Hospital and Northwestern University's Institute of Psychiatry were absorbed into Northwestern Memorial Hospital. A few years later, In 1979, the Olson Critical Care Pavilion opened adjacent to both the Passavant and Wesley Pavilions.

In the 1980s, it was realized that the hospital's original inpatient facilities could not keep up with the current technological advances and did not support any future growth. This triggered the planning and designing for a new facility to replace the Passavant Pavilion, Wesley Pavilion, and many of Northwestern's outpatient offices. In 1992, hospital administration announced that they would embark on a $630 million replacement hospital project to replace the aging Passavant and Wesley Pavilions. Construction on the new facility began in 1994 on the block bordered by Fairbanks Court, St. Clair, Huron and Erie Streets.

In 1996, surgeons from Northwestern Memorial Hospital became the first in Illinois to perform an islet cell transplantation.

On May 1, 1999, Northwestern Memorial Hospital opened the 17-floor Feinberg Pavilion and 22-floor Galter Pavilion at its current location in Streeterville. The new construction became a model facility for hospital construction attracting healthcare providers to the hospital. The new hospital consisted of 492-all-private-patient-rooms and an emergency department that has the capacity to treat 70,000 patients per year. At the end, the replacement hospital cost a total of $580 million and consisted of over 2 million square feet of space.

In 2001, demolition on the Passavant Building proceeded as the university had plans to replace the building with a new research facility. The new research facility was completed in 2005 and has since been named the "Robert H. Lurie Medical Research Center" to honor the $40 million donation from the Ann Lurie Foundation in honor of her late husband. Currently, all that remains from the former Passavant Pavilion is pieces of the wall preserved at the Feinberg Pavilion.

In 2005, the Bluhm Cardiovascular Institute was established at Northwestern Memorial after local philanthropist Neil G. Bluhm donated $10 million to Northwestern to establish a heart institute.

=== Modern day ===
In October 2007, after years of construction, the new Prentice Women's Hospital opened at 250 East Superior Street, the same site that held the former Wesley Hospital. This facility would replace the old Prentice Women's Hospital Building which later was demolished in September 2014 for new campus construction. The new hospital doubled the size of the previous women's hospital at 947,000 square feet (88,000 m^{2}), with one of the largest neonatal intensive care units in the country.

In 2009 the William Wirtz family (former owner of the Chicago Blackhawks) donated $19.5 million to Robert H. Lurie Cancer Center at Northwestern Memorial Hospital for cancer research.

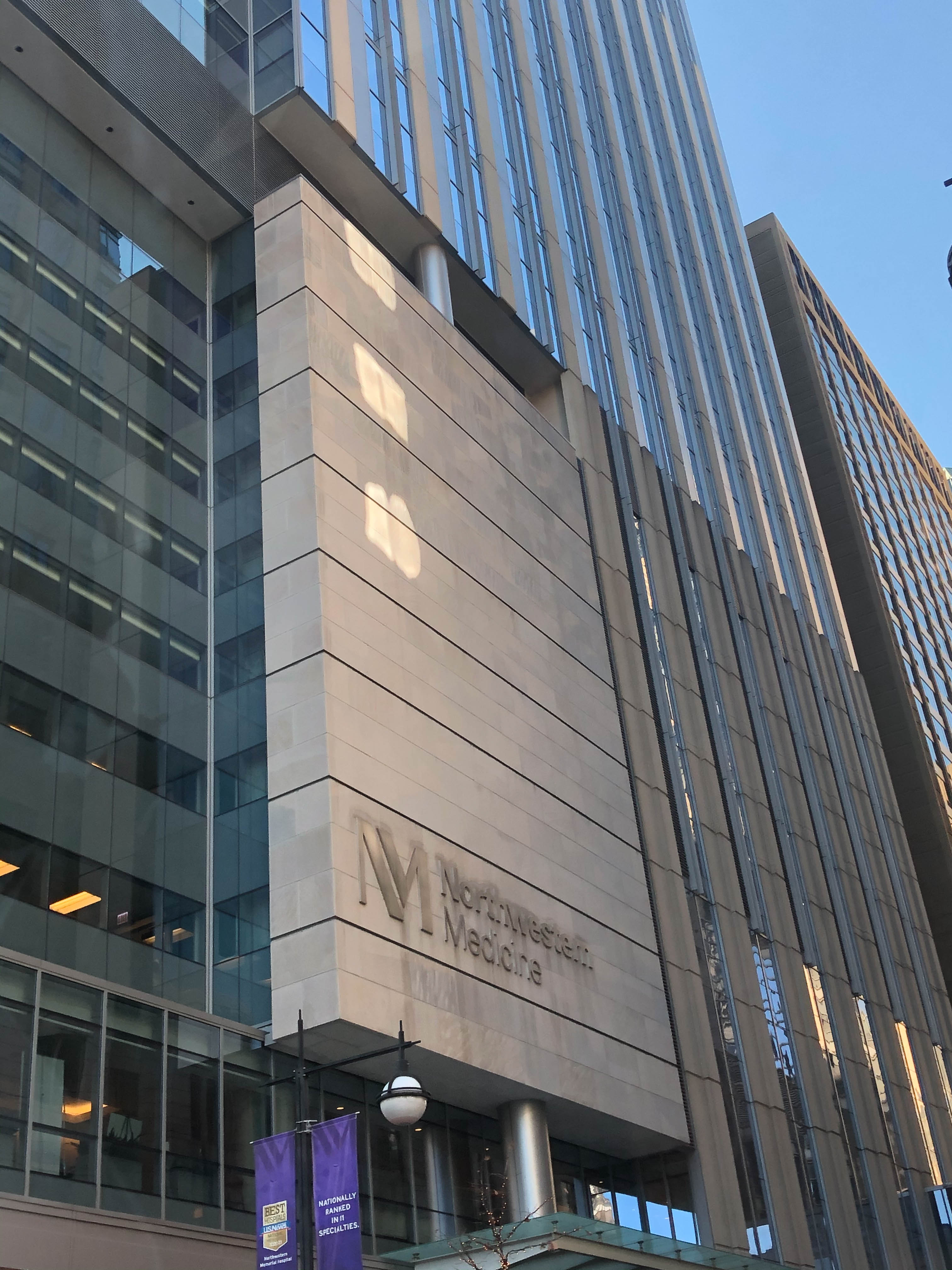
Eastern face of the Lavin Family Pavilion of Northwestern Memorial Hospital

The American College of Healthcare Architects recognized Northwestern Memorial for forward-thinking design as it was one of the first hospitals to dedicate private rooms to patients in the main Feinberg and Galter Pavilion buildings. To date, Northwestern Memorial Feinberg and Galter Pavilion buildings make it the third tallest hospital in the United States and the eighth tallest hospital in the world. The neighboring Lurie Children's Hospital, also affiliated with Northwestern, is the sixth tallest hospital facility in the country.

In 2011, demolition began on the building that was occupying 259 E. Erie Street to make way for the construction of the new Northwestern Outpatient Pavilion. The next year, in 2012, Northwestern began construction on the $334 million, 1,000,000-square-foot (93,000 m^{2}) building. The new building contains the Northwestern Musculoskeletal Institute, outpatient operating rooms, a center for diagnostics, eight floors of doctors offices, and a 575-car garage. The new building officially opened on October 13, 2014. In January 2015, Northwestern Medicine announced that they would convert the 11-floor of the building from doctors offices to additional operating rooms due to higher-than-expected demand of outpatient surgeries. In October 2015, the Northwestern Outpatient Pavilion was renamed to the Lavin Family Pavilion to honor the philanthropic efforts of the Lavin Family Foundation towards Northwestern Medicine.

On October 12, 2015, Northwestern Memorial Hospital named Julie L. Creamer as its first female president. Creamer received her BSN from Marquette University and holds a Master of Science Degree from the University of Illinois at Chicago.

With construction beginning in 2015 and completed in 2019, the Simpson Querrey Biomedical Research Center is a 600,000-square-foot (56,000 m^{2}) building on the hospital campus that houses laboratories dedicated to biomedical research. Future expansion of the 14-story building will bring total dedicated research square footage to roughly 1.2 million. The project was partially funded and eventually named after Louis Simpson and his wife, Kimberly Querrey who made a $92 million donation to the center.

In February 2020, it was announced that Northwestern Memorial Hospital would once again expand bed capacity, building a three-story addition between the Galter and Feinberg Pavilions with 49 new beds.

==== Cyber attack ====
In April 2021, a breach at Elekta Inc., a company who handles cancer patient data for Illinois, involved unauthorized access to patient information from the Northwestern Memorial Healthcare system. Hospital officials claimed that personally identifiable information including social security numbers were involved in the leak.

== About ==
Northwestern Memorial provides a total of 894 inpatient beds and encompasses more than three million square feet (280,000 m^{2}) of medical buildings within the Northwestern University Chicago campus in the Streeterville neighborhood downtown. Nearly every medical specialty is represented by over 1,900 physicians on the medical staff at Northwestern Memorial who also carry faculty appointments with Feinberg School of Medicine. As of 2018, total hospital-based research funding topped $484 million, placing Northwestern in the top 15 for the National Institutes of Health ranking among all American medical schools. The hospital's endowment reached $264 million as of 2020.

Northwestern Memorial is a partner with CommunityHealth in Chicago and provides healthcare through medical volunteers who participate in a residency program at the center's two sites in the West Town and Englewood neighborhoods.

=== Research ===
In partnership with the Feinberg School of Medicine at Northwestern University, more than 4,500 clinical trials and studies are conducted each year with over 50,000 patients and volunteers participating.

Research awards for Feinberg totaled $534 million in fiscal year 2019. Current clinical trials are being conducted in the following areas: AIDS, cancer, cardiovascular disease, dermatology, diabetes, gastroenterology, genetics (stem cell research), mental health, neurology, obstetrics and gynecology, rheumatology & immunology, sleep disorders, organ transplantation, and weight loss.

The Simpson Querrey Biomedical Research Center opened in 2019 and is expected to produce over $1.5 billion in new federal medical research funding in the center's first 10 years.

== Facilities ==
=== Galter ===
The Galter Pavilion is one of the main buildings making up Northwestern Memorial Hospital and is named after hospital benefactors Jack and Dollie Galter. It is one of the tallest hospital buildings in the United States, and is the twenty-third tallest in the world. The Galter Pavilion is joined to the hospital's Feinberg Pavilion on the first three floors. The buildings were constructed as the centerpiece of Northwestern Memorial Hospital in 1997. Together the buildings house a total of 2,134,920 square feet of space. It currently houses a combination of inpatient and outpatient services.

=== Feinberg ===
Construction on the Feinberg Pavilion happened simultaneously as the neighboring Galter Pavilion was being constructed. Feinberg primarily serves as the inpatient component for the hospital. The Feinberg Pavilion is joined to the hospital's Galter Pavilion on the first three floors. The two buildings were constructed as the centerpiece of Northwestern Memorial Hospital in 1997. Additionally, the Feinberg pavilion houses the main imaging department of the Robert H. Lurie Comprehensive Cancer Center.

=== Lavin Family ===
The Lavin Family Pavilion (formerly Northwestern Outpatient Pavilion) is the main outpatient pavilion of Northwestern Memorial Hospital. The building opened in 2014 and contains the Northwestern Musculoskeletal Institute, outpatient operating rooms, a center for diagnostics, eight floors of doctors offices, a 575-car garage, and ground level restaurants.

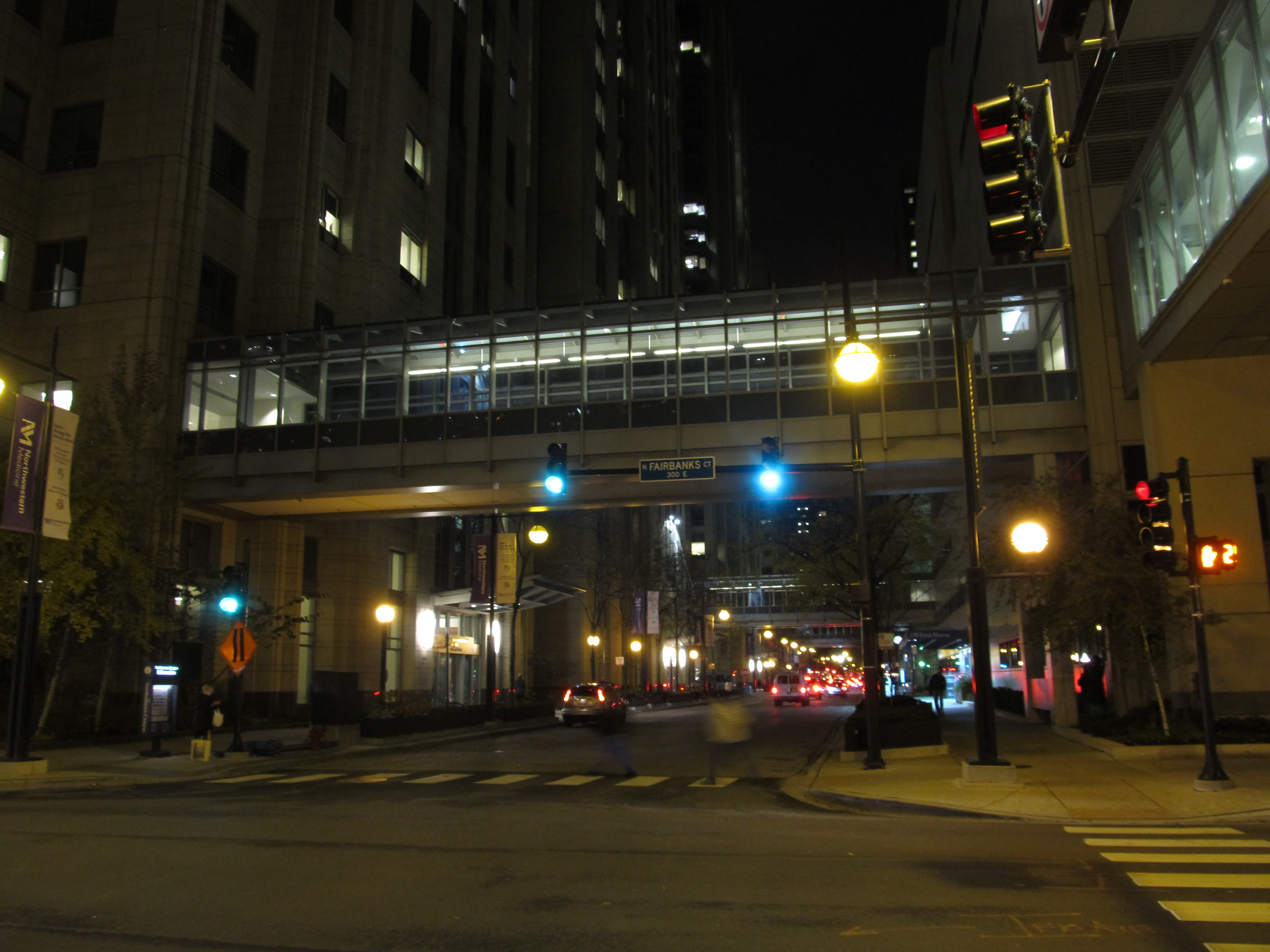
A skybridge between the Feinberg and Olson Pavilions

=== Olson ===
In 1979, the Olson Critical Care Pavilion opened adjacent to both the Passavant and Wesley Pavilions.

=== Prentice ===
Prentice Women's Hospital is an acute care women's hospital located adjacent to both Northwestern Memorial and the Lurie Children's Hospital. Prentice Women's Hospital is a member of Northwestern Medicine and serves as a teaching hospital for the Northwestern University Feinberg School of Medicine. The hospital provides tertiary-level obstetric, gynecological, and neonatal care to patients from the entire region. The hospital has 256 beds, with 86 AAP verified level III neonatal intensive care unit beds, 32 labor and delivery beds, 86 healthy bassinets, and 10 operating rooms. The hospital is directly attached to the Lurie Children's Hospital via skybridge because Lurie physicians provide care on Prentice's neonatal intensive care units. Additionally, Prentice houses three inpatient units of the Robert H. Lurie Comprehensive Cancer Center; and select outpatient cancer services.

== Awards ==
Northwestern Memorial Hospital is frequently ranked as a top hospital in both Chicago and Illinois as well as in the top 10 of hospitals in the nation.

Northwestern Memorial is also ranked among the best in the nation in 12 specialties: neurology and neurosurgery (#7); orthopedics (#7); diabetes and endocrinology (#9); urology (#9); digestive disorders (gastroenterology) (#10); gynecology (#11); geriatrics (#11); heart (cardiology) and cardiac surgery (#12); pulmonology (#13); cancer (oncology) (#14); nephrology (kidney disorders) (#14); ear, nose and throat (otolaryngology) (#17); and as high-performing in rheumatology and ophthalmology.

The hospital ranked nationally in 11 adult specialties and as #1 in Illinois on the 2020-21 U.S. News & World Report: Best Hospitals rankings. In addition, the hospital was ranked as the tenth-best hospital in the country.

2020-21 U.S. News & World Report Rankings for Northwestern Memorial Hospital
Specialty	Rank (In the U.S.)	Score (Out of 100)
Cancer	#8	69.1
Cardiology & Heart Surgery	#10	72.1
Diabetes & Endocrinology	#21	61.8
Ear, Nose & Throat	#26	69.5
Gastroenterology & GI Surgery	#12	76.7
Geriatrics	#6	94.2
Gynecology	Not Ranked	53.7
Nephrology	#13	68.8
Neurology & Neurosurgery	#5	93.6
Ophthalmology	Not Ranked	1.9
Orthopedics	#15	58.5
Psychiatry	Not Ranked	1.2
Pulmonology & Lung Surgery	#13	80.5
Rehabilitation	Not Ranked	
Rheumatology	High Performing	4.8
Urology	#12	76.7

== See also ==
- Northwestern Medicine
- Lurie Children's Hospital
- Prentice Women's Hospital
- Feinberg School of Medicine
