= John Rockefeller Prentice =

American lawyer (1902–1972)

- Born: John Rockefeller Prentice; December 17, 1902; New York City, U.S.
- Died: June 13, 1972 (aged 69); Phoenix, Arizona, U.S.
- Education: Yale Law School
- Occupation: Attorney
- Spouse: Abbie Cantrill (m. 1941)
- Children: Abra Prentice Wilkin
- Parent(s): Ezra Parmalee Prentice; Alta Rockefeller Prentice
- Family: Rockefeller family

John Rockefeller Prentice (December 17, 1902 – June 13, 1972) was an American attorney and member of the prominent Rockefeller family. He was born to Chicago lawyer Ezra Parmalee Prentice and Alta Rockefeller Prentice in New York. Prentice's maternal grandfather was the Standard Oil tycoon, John D. Rockefeller (1839–1937).

== Biography ==
While attending Yale University, Prentice became a member of the Skull and Bones society and was elected to Phi Beta Kappa. He graduated in 1928. During his years at Yale, Prentice had accumulated debts and consequently was cut off from his parents. He worked in Boston for a wholesale hardware firm for four years to make enough money to return to Yale. Upon his return to the Ivy League school, Prentice continued to work to support himself. He graduated from Yale Law School in 1932 and practiced law with a Chicago law firm throughout the 1930s. In March 1941, before the Japanese attack at Pearl Harbor, Prentice volunteered in the U.S. Army as a private. While serving in the Pacific Theatre of World War II, he became a captain in the artillery.

Prentice became a cattle breeder and is known as a pioneer of artificial insemination in farm animals as a means of improving their genetic pool.

== Personal life ==
On August 11, 1941, Prentice married Abbie Cantrill. The couple had one daughter, Chicago philanthropist, Abra Prentice Wilkin.
