= List of Canadian Professional Rodeo Association Champions =

The following is a complete list of year-end champions for the Canadian Professional Rodeo Association (CPRA), the sanctioning body for professional rodeo in Canada. In recent times, the CPRA champions have been determined at the Canadian Finals Rodeo (CFR) in Edmonton, Alberta. Women's all-around champions are determined by the Canadian Girls' Rodeo Association. See here for the inductees of the Canadian Pro Rodeo Hall of Fame.

== Contestant awards ==
=== All-around cowboy ===
- Carl Olson 1945
- Gordon Doan 1946
- Ken Brower 1947
- Reg Kesler 1948
- Bill McLean 1949
- Wilf Girletz 1950
- Reg Kesler 1951
- Bud Van Cleave 1952
- Reg Kesler 1953
- Gordon Earl 1954
- Wilf Girletz 1955
- Dick Nash 1956
- Wilf Girletz 1957
- Brian Butterfield 1958
- Ellie Lewis 1959
- George Myren 1960
- Dick Havens 1961
- Keith Hyland 1962
- George Myren 1963
- Keith Hyland 1964
- Harold Mandeville 1965
- Tom Bews 1966
- Kenny McLean 1967
- Kenny McLean 1968
- Kenny McLean 1969
- Arnold Haraga 1970
- Tom Bews 1971
- Kenny McLean 1972
- Tom Bews 1973
- Phil Doan 1974
- Bob Hartell 1975
- Tom Bews 1976
- Ben Hern 1977
- Mel Coleman 1978
- Tom Bews 1979
- Tom Eirikson 1980
- Tom Eirikson 1981
- Mel Coleman 1982
- Tom Eirikson 1983
- Mel Coleman 1984
- Greg Schlosser 1985
- Tom Eirikson 1986
- Duane Daines 1987
- Mel Coleman 1988
- Mel Coleman 1989
- Steve Dunham 1990
- Duane Daines 1991
- Bernie Smyth 1992
- Steve Dunham 1993
- Rod Warren 1994
- Duane Daines 1995
- Rod Warren 1996
- Rod Warren 1997
- Rod Warren 1998
- Rod Warren 1999
- Rod Warren 2000
- Rod Warren 2001
- Kyle Thomson 2002
- Steven Turner 2003
- Rod Warren 2004
- Jeremy Harden 2005
- Rod Warren 2006
- Steven Turner 2007
- Steven Turner 2008
- Kyle Thomson 2009
- Steven Turner 2010
- Kyle Thomson 2011
- Kyle Thomson 2012
- Travis Reay 2013
- Ky Marshall 2014
- Josh Harden 2015
- Luke Butterfield 2016
- Ky Marshall 2017
- Jacob Gardner 2018
- Jacob Gardner 2019
- Jared Parsonage 2021
- Wyatt Hayes 2022
- Logan Spady 2023
- Logan Spady 2024
- Logan Spady 2025
- Braden Brost 2026

=== Bareback riding ===
- Gordon Doan 1945
- Gordon Doan 1946
- Harold Mandeville 1947
- George Spence 1948
- Bob Duce 1949
- Bob Duce 1950
- Bob Duce 1951
- Bob Duce 1952
- Bob Duce 1953
- Gordon Earl 1954
- Alvin Owen 1955
- Alvin Owen 1956
- Ellie Lewis 1957
- Leo Brown 1958
- Dick Havens 1959
- Leo Brown 1960
- George Myren 1961
- Bob Duce 1962
- Malcolm Jones 1963
- Malcolm Jones 1964
- Jim Clifford 1965
- Malcolm Jones 1966
- Malcolm Jones 1967
- Happy Tegart 1968
- Dale Trottier 1969
- Dale Trottier 1970
- Dale Trottier 1971
- Dale Trottier 1972
- Dale Trottier 1973
- Dale Trottier 1974
- Mel Hyland 1975
- Gene Miller 1976
- Gene Miller 1977
- Dale Trottier 1978
- Steve Dunham 1979
- Jim Dunn 1980
- Steve Dunham 1981
- Steve Dunham 1982
- Robin Burwash 1983
- Robin Burwash 1984
- Jim Dunn 1985
- Jim Dunn 1986
- Robin Burwash 1987
- Steve Dunham 1988
- Robin Burwash 1989
- Steve Dunham 1990
- Billy Laye 1991
- Bill Boyd 1992
- Darrell Cholach 1993
- Bill Boyd 1994
- Davey Shields Jr. 1995
- Darrell Cholach 1996
- Travis Whiteside 1997
- Roger Lacasse 1998
- Darrell Cholach 1999
- Davey Shields Jr. 2000
- Bill Boyd 2001
- Davey Shields Jr. 2002
- Kyle Bowers 2003
- Roger Lacasse 2004
- Alan Dacyk 2005
- Dusty LaValley 2006
- Dusty LaValley 2007
- Kyle Bowers 2008
- Kyle Bowers 2009
- Dusty LaValley 2010
- Dusty LaValley 2011
- JR Vezain 2012
- Matt Lait 2013
- Jake Vold 2014
- Jake Vold 2015
- Jake Vold 2016
- Seth Hardwick 2017
- Richmond Champion 2018
- Orin Larsen 2019
- Clint Laye 2021
- Ty Taypotat 2022
- Clint Laye 2023
- Kody Lamb 2024
- Clint Laye 2025
- Orin Larsen 2026

=== Bull riding ===
- Frank Voros 1945
- Harry Thomson 1946
- Ralph Thomson 1947
- Wilf Girletz 1948
- Harry Thomson 1949
- Wilf Girletz 1950
- Wilf Girletz 1951
- Wilf Girletz 1952
- Gordon Earl 1953
- Gordon Earl 1954
- Wilf Girletz 1955
- Dick Nash 1956
- Lawrence Hutchison 1957
- Gid Garstad 1958
- Gid Garstad 1959
- Leo Brown 1960
- Leo Brown 1961
- Lawrence Hutchison 1962
- Leo Brown 1963
- Gid Garstad 1964
- Gid Garstad 1965
- Gid Garstad 1966
- Dave Garstad 1967
- Leo Brown 1968
- John Dodds 1969
- Dale Fuhriman 1970
- John Dodds 1971
- John Dodds 1972
- Leo Brown 1973
- Jim Freeman 1974
- Brian Claypool 1975
- Brian Claypool 1976
- John Dodds 1977
- Don Johansen 1978
- Bob Phipps 1979
- Bruce Johansen 1980
- Greg Schlosser 1981
- Brian Aebly 1982
- Dale Johansen 1983
- Dale Johansen 1984
- Greg Schlosser 1985
- Cody Snyder 1986
- Guy Johansen 1987
- Dan Lowry 1988
- Glen Keeley 1989
- Daryl Mills 1990
- Greg Schlosser 1991
- Daryl Mills 1992
- Wayde Joyal 1993
- Wayde Joyal 1994
- Wes Cyr 1995
- Jay Manning 1996
- Robert Bowers 1997
- Merle Freeman 1998
- Rob Bell 1999
- Rob Bell 2000
- Scott Schiffner 2001
- Justin Volz 2002
- Jody Turner 2003
- Rob Bell 2004
- Chris Hansen 2005
- Tanner Girletz 2006
- Nathan Roy 2007
- Tyler Thomson 2008
- Brett Thompson 2009
- Jesse Torkelson 2010
- Chad Besplug 2011
- Scott Schiffner 2012
- Chad Besplug 2013
- Dakota Buttar 2014
- Dakota Buttar 2015
- Jordan Hansen 2016
- Garrett Smith 2017
- Wacey Finkbeiner 2018
- Edgar Durazo 2019
- Jared Parsonage 2021
- Jared Parsonage 2022
- Edgar Durazo 2023
- William Barrows 2024
- Jared Parsonage 2025
- Grady Young 2026

=== Saddle bronc riding ===
- Carl Olson 1945
- Carl Olson 1946
- Joe Keeler 1947
- Carl Olson 1948
- Allan Brown 1949
- Cam Lansdell 1950
- Frank Duce 1951
- Frank Duce 1952
- Ellie Lewis 1953
- Marty Wood 1954
- Marty Wood 1955
- Bob Robinson 1956
- Winston Bruce 1957
- Winston Bruce 1958
- Kenny McLean 1959
- Kenny McLean 1960
- Kenny McLean 1961
- Leo Brown 1962
- Marty Wood 1963
- Rocky Rockabar 1964
- Wayne Vold 1965
- Wayne Vold 1966
- Mel Hyland 1967
- Kenny McLean 1968
- Kenny McLean 1969
- Jerry Sinclair 1970
- Tom Bews 1971
- Mel Hyland 1972
- Jerry Sinclair 1973
- Mel Coleman 1974
- Mel Coleman 1975
- Wilf Hyland 1976
- Mel Coleman 1977
- Mel Coleman 1978
- Mel Hyland 1979
- Wilf Hyland 1980
- Clayton Hines 1981
- Mel Hyland 1982
- Mel Coleman 1983
- Jim Kelts 1984
- Clayton Hines 1985
- Mel Coleman 1986
- Guy Shapka 1987
- John Smith 1988
- Mel Coleman 1989
- Rod Hay 1990
- Duane Daines 1991
- Rod Hay 1992
- Rod Hay 1993
- Rod Hay 1994
- Denny Hay 1995
- Denny Hay 1996
- Rod Hay 1997
- Denny Hay 1998
- Rod Hay 1999
- Glen O'Neill 2000
- Rod Warren 2001
- Rod Hay 2002
- Dustin Flundra 2003
- Rod Hay 2004
- Rod Warren 2005
- Ross Kreutzer 2006
- Dustin Flundra 2007
- Dusty Hausauer 2008
- Chet Johnson 2009
- Dustin Flundra 2010
- Taos Muncy 2011
- Luke Butterfield 2012
- Rylan Geiger 2013
- Tyler Corrington 2014
- Cody DeMoss 2015
- Clay Elliot 2016
- Layton Green 2017
- Clay Elliot 2018
- Zeke Thurston 2019
- Zeke Thurston 2021
- Zeke Thurston 2022
- Zeke Thurston 2023
- Zeke Thurston 2024
- Zeke Thurston 2025
- Ben Anderson 2026

=== Steer wrestling ===
- Floyd Peters 1945
- Harold Mandeville 1946
- Harold Mandeville 1947
- Carl Olson 1948
- Everett Vold 1949
- Don Dewar 1950
- Tom Duce 1951
- Harold Mandeville 1952
- Brian Butterfield 1953
- Bud Van Cleave 1954
- Brian Butterfield 1955
- Bud Butterfield 1956
- Harold Mandeville 1957
- Bud Butterfield 1958
- Bud Butterfield 1959
- Bud Butterfield 1960
- Brian Butterfield 1961
- Bud Butterfield 1962
- Bud Butterfield 1963
- Alex Laye 1964
- Brian Butterfield 1965
- Harold Mandeville 1966
- Dave Penner 1967
- Dave Penner 1968
- Dave Penner 1969
- Arnold Haraga 1970
- Tom Bews 1971
- Kenny McLean 1972
- Phil Doan 1973
- Lee Phillips 1974
- Ron Ostrom 1975
- Lee Phillips 1976
- Greg Butterfield 1977
- Dave MacDonald 1978
- Greg Butterfield 1979
- Greg Butterfield 1980
- Ken Guenthner 1981
- Blaine Pederson 1982
- Blaine Pederson 1983
- Lee Laskosky 1984
- Greg Cassidy 1985
- Lee Laskosky 1986
- Greg Cassidy 1987
- Greg Cassidy 1988
- Gerald Willsie 1989
- Brad Nielsen 1990
- Mark Roy 1991
- Mark Roy 1992
- Blaine Pederson 1993
- Blaine Pederson 1994
- Todd Boggust 1995
- Lee Graves 1996
- Lee Graves 1997
- Leon Laye 1998
- BJ Zieffle 1999
- Greg Cassidy 2000
- Lee Graves 2001
- David Gibson 2002
- Lee Graves 2003
- Justin Guenthner 2004
- Lee Graves 2005
- Curtis Cassidy 2006
- Todd Woodward 2007
- Cody Cassidy 2008
- Cody Cassidy 2009
- Curtis Cassidy 2010
- Cody Cassidy 2011
- Tanner Milan 2012
- Clayton Moore 2013
- Tanner Milan 2014
- Cody Cassidy 2015
- Cody Cassidy 2016
- Jason Thomas 2017
- Scott Guenthner 2018
- Scott Guenthner 2019
- Cody Cassidy 2021
- Scott Guenthner 2022
- Scott Guenthner 2023
- Dalton Massey 2024
- Scott Guenthner 2025
- Scott Guenthner 2026

=== Tie-down roping ===
- Floyd Peters 1945
- Floyd Peters 1946
- Floyd Peters 1947
- Fred Gladstone 1948
- Cliff Vandergrift 1949
- Fred Gladstone 1950
- Bill Collins 1951
- Bill Collins 1952
- Cliff Vandergrift 1953
- Cliff Vandergrift 1954
- John Hauck 1955
- Bill Collins 1956
- Bill Collins 1957
- Cliff Vandergrift 1958
- Bud Van Cleave 1959
- Harold Mandeville 1960
- Bud Van Cleave 1961
- Lorne Wells 1962
- Lorne Wells 1963
- Lorne Wells 1964
- Bud Van Cleave 1965
- Fred Duke 1966
- Wells 1967
- Lorne Wells 1968
- Jim Gladstone 1969
- Lorne Wells 1970
- Jim Gladstone 1971
- Kenny McLean 1972
- Jim Gladstone 1973
- Lorne Wells 1974
- Gerald Reber 1975
- Bill Reeder 1976
- Lorne Wells 1977
- Harley Hook 1978
- Oscar Walter 1979
- Harley Hook 1980
- Larry Robinson 1981
- Larry Robinson 1982
- Joe Lucas 1983
- Larry Robinson 1984
- Larry Robinson 1985
- Joe Lucas 1986
- Mark Nugent 1987
- Joe Lucas 1988
- Cliff Williamson 1989
- Joe Butterfield 1990
- Cliff Williamson 1991
- Larry Robinson 1992
- Darren Zieffle 1993
- Larry Robinson 1994
- Darren Shaw 1995
- Cliff Williamson 1996
- Joe Lucas 1997
- Marty Becker 1998
- Travis Houff 1999
- Darren Shaw 2000
- Curtis Cassidy 2001
- Cliff Williamson 2002
- Steve Lloyd 2003
- Cliff Williamson 2004
- Jeff Chapman 2005
- Tyson Durfey 2006
- Clint Robinson 2007
- Tyson Durfey 2008
- Alwin Bouchard 2009
- Tuf Cooper 2010
- Tyrel Flewelling 2011
- Shane Hanchey 2012
- Timber Moore 2013
- Matt Shiozawa 2014
- Shane Hanchey 2015
- Matt Shiozawa 2016
- Logan Bird 2017
- Shane Hanchey 2018
- Shane Hanchey 2019
- Riley Warren 2021
- Ty Harris 2022
- Haven Meged 2023
- Haven Meged 2024
- Kyle Lucas 2025
- Austin Hines 2026

=== Novice saddle bronc riding ===
- Winston Bruce 1954
- Winston Bruce 1955
- Jack Daines 1956
- Jack Daines 1957
- Garth Maxwell 1958
- Garth Maxwell 1959
- Jim McKenzie 1960
- Wayne Vold 1961
- Floyd Griffin 1962
- Ivan Daines 1963
- Jack Phipps 1964
- Ivan Daines 1965
- Mel Hyland 1966
- Francis Bourque 1967
- Francis Bourque 1968
- Sanford Cox 1969
- Jack Duce 1970
- Bart Brower 1971
- Brian Claypool 1972
- Jim Kelts 1973
- Keith Gower 1974
- Don McMahon 1975
- Austin Mawson 1976
- Lee Stuckey 1977
- Duane Daines 1978
- Clark Jackson 1979
- Guy Gottfriedsen 1980
- John Smith 1981
- Guy Shapka 1982
- Allan McKenzie 1983
- Mark Leggette 1984
- Norman Kerr 1985
- Vane Hughson 1986
- Denny Hay 1987
- Rod Hay 1988
- Mike Stanton 1989
- Mike Stanton 1990
- Lee Sinclair 1991
- Jay Louis 1992
- Christopher Bews 1993
- Christopher Bews 1994
- Jonathan Blackmore 1995
- Tom Bingham 1996
- Kyle Thomson 1997
- Ben Louis 1998
- Dustin Thompson 1999
- Dustin Flundra 2000
- Sam Kelts 2001
- Riley Harvie 2002
- Jim Berry 2003
- Luke Butterfield 2004
- Scott Lourance 2005
- Cordel Griffith 2006
- Wyatt Daines 2007
- Rylan Geiger 2008
- Rylan Geiger 2009
- Coleman Watt 2010
- Ky Marshall 2011
- Layton Green 2012
- Zeke Thurston 2013
- Lane Cust 2014
- Lane Cust 2015
- Kolby Wanchuk 2016
- Dawson Hay 2017
- Cooper Thatcher 2018
- Lachlan Sheppard 2019
- Brodie Roessler 2021
- Colten Powell 2022
- Jaret Cooper 2023
- Lonnie Dunn 2024
- Clay Greenslade 2025
- Sawyer Hutchinson 2026

=== Barrel racing ===
- Ingrid Hewitt 1957
- Viola Thomas 1958
- Viola Thomas 1959
- Isabella Miller 1960
- Viola Thomas 1961
- Gina McDougall 1962
- Gina McDougall 1963
- Jerri Duce 1964
- Jerri Duce 1965
- Jerri Duce 1966
- Geraldine McLaughlin 1967
- Jerri Duce 1968
- Isabella Miller 1969
- Jerri Duce 1970
- Mary McGhie 1971
- Frances Church 1972
- Sandy McNamee 1973
- Jerri Duce 1974
- Jerri Duce 1975
- Jerri Duce 1976
- Jerri Duce 1977
- Elaine Watt 1978
- Elaine Watt 1979
- Mary Lynn Walter 1980
- Sheila Haggart 1981
- Elaine Watt 1982
- Carol Stewart 1983
- Ruth McDougall 1984
- Ruth McDougall 1985
- Gayle Howes 1986
- Ruth McDougall 1987
- Ruth McDougall 1988
- Ruth McDougall 1989
- Rayel Robinson 1990
- Rayel Robinson 1991
- Dee Butterfield 1992
- Nikki Ree 1993
- Dawn Rude 1994
- Debbie Renger 1995
- Debbie Renger 1996
- Dawn Rude 1997
- Debbie Renger 1998
- Rayel Robinson 1999
- Debbie Renger 2000
- Carol Barr 2001
- Carol Barr 2002
- Raylee Edwards 2003
- Jill Bishop 2004
- Rayel Robinson 2005
- Lisa Lockhart 2006
- Debbie Renger 2007
- Lisa Lockhart 2008
- Gaylene Buff 2009
- Rana Koopmans 2010
- Trula Churchill 2011
- Lisa Lockhart 2012
- Lisa Lockhart 2013
- Steffanie Mather 2014
- Nancy Csabay 2015
- Nancy Csabay 2016
- Carman Pozzobon 2017
- Callahan Crossley 2018
- Brooke Wills Kamloops 2019
- Justine Elliott 2021
- Taylor Manning 2022
- Lynette Brodoway 2023
- Taylor Manning 2024
- Jayden Wilson 2025
- Karlie Cowie 2026

=== All-around cowgirl ===
- Isabella Miller 1963
- Audrey Henry 1964
- Audrey Henry and Babe Lauder (tie) 1965
- Isabella Miller 1966
- Isabella Miller 1967
- Isabella Miller 1968
- Isabella Miller 1969
- Donalda Cochrane 1970
- Lorraine McLean 1971
- Lorraine McLean 1972
- Diane White 1973
- Wendy Kazakow 1977
- Wendy Kazakow 1980
- Wendy Flewelling 1985
- Lawrie Sanders 2016
- Kylie Whiteside 2022
- Bradi Whiteside 2023
- Bradi Whiteside 2024
- Bradi Whiteside 2025
- Bradi Whiteside 2026

=== Permit Holder Award ===
- Blair Wills 1965
- Grant Gurr 1966
- Brian Whitlow 1967
- Lynn Jensen 1968
- Dale Butterwick 1969
- Jerry Sinclair 1970
- Rocky Hubley 1971
- Brian Claypool 1972
- Jim Freeman 1973
- Joe Chomistek 1974
- Larry Robinson 1975
- Don McMahon 1976
- Tom Eirikson 1977
- Rick Shepherd 1978
- Vern Smith 1979
- John Gillis 1980
- Rick Kohorst 1981
- Tom McKenzie 1982
- Mark Laye 1983
- Guy Chomistek 1984
- Clayton Keeley 1985
- John Gibson 1986
- David Reid 1987
- Roland Sippola 1988
- Rod Hay 1989
- Wade Graves 1990
- BJ Zieffle 1991
- Clark Hughson 1992
- Robert Bowers 1993
- Darcy Roy 1994
- Don Blishen 1995
- Brian Thiessen 1996
- Tyler Martens 1997
- Blade Young 1998
- Luke Ellingson 1999
- Chad Davidson 2000
- Denton Edge 2001
- Reid Rowan 2002
- Matt Lait 2003
- Tanner Girletz 2004
- Chad Besplug 2005
- Devon Mezei 2006
- Timber Moore 2007
- Kyle French 2008
- Delano Kjos 2009
- Julie Leggett 2010
- Ty Taypotat 2011
- Ky Marshall 2012
- Kerilee Noval 2013
- Billy West 2014
- Cayla Melby 2015
- Lane Cust 2016
- Diane Skocdopole 2017
- Cody Coverchuk 2018
- Edgar Durazo 2019
- Lucas Macza 2021
- Kirby Penttila 2022
- Kate Beierbach 2023
- Walker Warkentin 2024
- Taylor Cherry 2025

=== Rookie of the Year ===
- Jerry Sinclair 1970
- Rocky Hubley 1971
- Bart Brower 1972
- Lee Phillips 1973
- Mel Coleman 1974
- Ron Ostrom 1975
- Jim Dunn 1976
- Doug Wilkinson 1977
- Robert Hoff 1978
- Darryl Collins 1979
- Cliff Williamson 1980
- Barney Barnson 1981
- Blaine Pederson 1982
- Guy Perozak 1983
- Guy Shapka 1984
- Bob House 1985
- Kevin West 1986
- Mark Nugent 1987
- Roland Sippola 1988
- Denny Hay 1989
- Daryl Mills 1990
- Todd Brantner 1991
- BJ Zieffle 1992
- Darren Shaw 1993
- Jason DelGuercio 1994
- Reg Pomeranz 1995
- Blair Stroh 1996
- Curtis Cassidy 1997
- Craig McPhee 1998
- Luke Ellingson 1999
- Trygve Pugh 2000
- Beau McArthur 2001
- Sam Kelts 2002
- Craig Guthrie 2003
- Dusty Ephrom 2004
- Chad Besplug 2005
- Travis Frank 2006
- Timber Moore 2007
- Dustan McPhee 2008
- Travis Reay 2009
- Ty Pozzobon 2010
- Ty Taypotat 2011
- Chason Floyd 2012
- Justin Miller 2013
- Billy West 2014
- Lonnie West 2015
- Lane Cust 2016
- Diane Skocdopole 2017
- Cody Lee Coverchuk 2018
- Edgar Durazo 2019
- Kash Bonnett 2021
- Bayleigh Choate 2022
- Karli Cowie 2023
- Grady Young 2024
- Taylor Cherry 2025

=== Junior steer riding ===
- Marty Lyle 1974
- Mark Laye 1975
- Bruce Kostelansky 1976
- Bruce Kostelansky 1977
- Bruce Kostelansky 1978
- Jay Shockey 1979
- Darcy Cressman 1980
- Mark Nugent 1981
- Kelly Crouch 1982
- Glen Keeley 1983
- Shawn Vant 1984
- Jeff Whitlow 1985
- Rod Baptiste Jr. 1986
- Jayson Keeley 1987
- Greg Whitlow 1988
- Davey Shields Jr. 1989
- Denny Golden 1990
- Denny Golden 1991
- Tyler Martens 1992
- Dennis Morton 1993
- Todd Jr. Buffalo 1994
- Jason Finkbeiner 1995
- Kyle Switzer 1996
- Mckenzie Loree 1997
- Tyler Pankewitz 1998
- Tyler Prescott 1999
- Wacey Nash 2000
- Brandon Copithorne 2001
- Brady Scott 2002
- Thomas McNeil 2003
- Tyler Patten 2004
- Tom Clarke 2005
- Kelton Watson 2006
- Dantan Bertsch 2007
- Zeke Thurston 2008
- Shay Marks 2009
- Bryce West 2010
- Brian Symington 2011
- Kagen Schmidt 2012
- Kagen Schmidt 2013
- Coy Robbins 2014
- Luke Ferber 2015
- Dixon Tattrie 2016
- Luke Ferber 2017
- Tristen Manning 2018
- Tristen Manning 2019
- Kane Scott 2021
- Nash Loewen 2022
- Hayden Mulvey 2023
- Davis Young 2024
- Ryder Topolinski 2025
- Ryder Topolinski 2026

=== Novice bareback riding ===
- Neal Campbell 1980
- Cam Morris 1981
- Bill Boyd 1982
- Rod Bevans 1983
- Gordon Campbell 1984
- Keith Ullery 1985
- Wade Galloway 1986
- Wade Graves 1987
- Shawn Vant 1988
- Bruce Pierson 1989
- Shane Kesler 1990
- Travis Whiteside 1991
- Jason DelGuercio 1992
- Davey Shields Jr. 1993
- Doug Tkach 1994
- Jay Phipps 1995
- Jay Phipps 1996
- Kyle Bowers 1997
- Kyle Bowers 1998
- Wace Hartell 1999
- Monty Koopman 2000
- Dusty LaValley 2001
- Clayton Bunney 2002
- Clayton Bunney 2003
- Dusty Roberts 2004
- Kevin Taylor 2005
- Luke Creasy 2006
- Jake Vold 2007
- Denver DeRose 2008
- Colin Adams 2009
- Colin Adams 2010
- Coleman Watt 2011
- Jacob Stemo 2012
- Kody Lamb 2013
- Dantan Bertsch 2014
- Wyatt Gleeson 2015
- Tanner Young 2016
- Connor Hamilton 2017
- Mason Helmeczi 2018
- Chet Dietz 2019
- Cruz McNulty 2021
- Blake Link 2022
- Chase Siemens 2023
- Jace Lomheim 2024
- Quaide Skjonsberg 2025
- Quaide Skjonsberg 2026

=== Team-roping headers ===
- Troy Fischer 2000
- Murray Linthicum 2001
- Daryn Knapp 2002
- Travis Gallais 2003
- Murray Linthicum 2004
- Travis Gallais 2005
- Justin McCarroll 2006
- Justin McCarroll 2007
- Murray Linthicum 2008
- Travis Gallais 2009
- Chase Simpson 2010
- Levi Simpson 2011
- Dustin Bird 2012
- Kolton Schmidt 2013
- Levi Simpson 2014
- Roland McFadden 2015
- Dustin Bird 2016
- Levi Simpson 2017
- Levi Simpson 2018
- Matt Sherwood 2019
- Clay Ullery 2021
- Dawson Graham 2022
- Brady Tryan 2023
- Kavis Drake 2024
- Kash Bonnett 2025
- Kavis Drake 2026

=== Team-roping heelers ===
- Ronald Schmidt 2000
- Rocky Dallyn 2001
- Dwight Wigemyr 2002
- Travis Gallais 2003
- Rocky Dallyn 2003
- Marty Becker 2004
- Rocky Dallyn 2005
- Brett McCarroll 2006
- Brett McCarroll 2007
- Justin McCarroll 2007
- Dwight Wigemyr 2008
- Kevin Schreiner 2009
- Rocky Dallyn 2010
- Tyrel Flewelling 2011
- Paul Eaves 2012
- Tyrel Flewelling 2013
- Ryon Tittel 2014
- Tyrel Flewelling 2015
- Russell Cardoza 2016
- Jeremy Buhler 2017
- Jeremy Buhler 2018
- Hunter Koch 2019
- Tyce McLeod 2021
- Dillon Graham 2022
- Calgary Smith 2023
- Jeremy Buhler 2024
- Logan Cullen 2025
- Denim Ross 2026

=== Breakaway roping ===
- Kendal Pierson 2021
- Kendal Pierson 2022
- Shaya Biever 2023
- Macy Auclair 2024
- Bradi Whiteside 2025
- Bradi Whiteside 2026

=== Kenny McLean Award ===
- Jake Gardner 2022
- Kyle Wanchuk 2023
- Kyle Wanchuk 2024
- Kyle Wanchuk 2025
- Sawyer Eirikson 2026

== Livestock awards ==
=== Bucking Stock of the Year ===
==== Saddle Broncs ====
Year	Brand	Name	Stock Contractor
1960	14	Hat Rack	Reg Kesler
1961	15	Red Wing	Calgary Stampede
1962	Bar 7X		Harry Vold
1963	9	Red Top	Myers Bar T
1964	220	Colonel Blue	Harry Vold
1965	23	Bugle Boy	Harry Vold
1966	80	Whiz Bang	Harry Vold
1967	9	Red Top	Myer Bar T
1968	85	Suntan	Reg Kesler
1969	02	Red Top	Reg Kesler
1970	89	Buckaroo	Larry Wyatt
1971	50	American Express	Vold Rodeo
1972	714	Sarcee Sorrel	Vold Rodeo
1973	737	Zone Along	Calgary Stampede
1974	108	High N Mighty	Leo Brown
1975	O	Charming Billy	Vold Rodeo
1976	108	High N Mighty	Leo Brown
1977	714	Sarcee Sorrel	Vold Rodeo
1978	5	Knott Inn	Reg Kesler
1979	50	American Express	Vold Rodeo
1980	50	American Express	Vold Rodeo
1981	108	Mighty Velvet	Verne Franklin
1982	G10	Guilty Cat	Calgary Stampede
1983	714	Sarcee Sorrel	Vold Rodeo
1984	L2	Try Me	Vold Rodeo
1985	W86	J.B.	Big Country Rodeo
1986	K20	Misty	Reg Kesler
1987	K25	Kloud Grey Skoal	Calgary Stampede
1988	8	Skoal's Alley Cat	Greg Kesler
1989	286	Papa Smurf	Calgary Stampede
1990	245	Lonesome Me Skoal	Calgary Stampede
1991	245	Lonesome Me Skoal	Calgary Stampede
1992	K2	Kingsway Skoal	Verne Franklin
1993	K2	Kingsway Skoal	Verne Franklin
1994	K2	Kingsway Skoal	Verne Franklin
1995	K2	Kingsway Skoal	Verne Franklin
1996	K2	Kingsway Skoal	Verne Franklin
1997	+04	Wyatt Earp Skoal	Harvey Northcutt
1998	+04	Wyatt Earp Skoal	Harvey Northcutt
1999	435	Skoal's Airwolf	Franklin Rodeo
2000	367	Skoal's Painted Smile	Kesler Rodeo
2001	367	Skoal's Painted Smile	Kesler Rodeo
2002	367	Skoal's Painted Smile	Kesler Rodeo
2003	547	Shady Cat	Kesler Rodeo
2004	354	Cool Alley	Kesler Championship Rodeo
2005	354	Cool Alley	Kesler Championship Rodeo
2006	354	Cool Alley	Kesler Championship Rodeo
2007	004	Bonus Alley	Kesler Championship Rodeo
2008	354	Cool Alley	Kesler Championship Rodeo
2009	L-40	Lynx Mountain	Calgary Stampede
2010	242	Get Smart	Harvey Northcutt Rodeo Company
2011	242	Get Smart	Harvey Northcutt Rodeo Company
2012	R3	Pedro	Vold Rodeo Company
2013	508	Lunatic Party	Outlaw Buckers Rodeo Company
2014	508	Lunatic Party	Outlaw Buckers Rodeo Company
2015	508	Lunatic Party	Outlaw Buckers Rodeo Company
2016	242	Get Smart	Northcutt-Macza Rodeo
2017	242	Get Smart	Northcutt-Macza Rodeo
2018	S-66	Stampede Warrior	Calgary Stampede
2019	242	Get Smart	Northcott-Macza Rodeo
2021	W-16	Wild Cherry	Calgary Stampede
2022	242	OLS Tubs Get Smart	Macza Rodeo
2023	X-9	Xplosive Skies	Calgary Stampede
2024	T-77	Tokyo Bubbles	Calgary Stampede
2025	F13	Virgil	C5 Rodeo
2026	91	Mary Lou	Yule Rodeo

==== Bareback Broncs ====
Year	Brand	Name	Stock Contractor
1974	33	Moonshine	Reg Kesler
1975	33	Moonshine	Reg Kesler
1976	231	Moon Rocket	Calgary Stampede
1977	33	Moonshine	Reg Kesler
1978	33	Moonshine	Reg Kesler
1979	L2	Moon	Grasslands
1980	1	Bojangles	Grasslands
1981	1	Hobbema Jack	Vold Rodeo
1982	3C	Three Cheers for Velvet	Reg Kesler
1983	34	Miss Cheadle	Vold Rodeo
1984	245	Lonesome Me	Calgary Stampede
1985	X23	Coyote	Myers Bar T
1986	0	Kickin' Country	Verne Franklin
1987	1	Ace of Spades	Reg Kesler
1988	K2	Kingsway Skoal	Verne Franklin
1989	G10	Guilty Cat Copenhagen	Calgary Stampede
1990	K2	Kingsway Skoal	Verne Franklin
1991	K2	Kingsway Skoal	Verne Franklin
1992	52	Copenhagen M.F.	Wagner Spit!ire, Reg Kesler
1993	435	Skoal's Airwolf	Verne Franklin
1994	H1	High Chaparral Copenhagen	Bar T
1995	527	Skoal's Blue Ridge	Verne Franklin
1996	338	Skoal's Alley Ways	Kesler Championship Rodeo
1997	47	Chester Skoal Bandit	Big Stone Rodeo Company
1998	338	Skoal's Alley Ways	Kesler Championship Rodeo
1999	527	Skoal's Blue Ridge	Franklin Rodeo
2000	527	Skoal's Instant Request	Kesler Rodeo
2001	338	Skoal's Alley Ways	Kesler Championship Rodeo
2002	338	Skoal's Alley Ways	Kesler Championship Rodeo
2003	G65	Grated Coconut	Calgary Stampede
2004	G65	Grated Coconut	Calgary Stampede
2005	G65	Grated Coconut	Calgary Stampede
2006	A43	Gold Dust	Peters & Sons Rodeo Company
2007	G65	Grated Coconut	Calgary Stampede
2008	G65	Grated Coconut	Calgary Stampede
2009	G65	Grated Coconut	Calgary Stampede
2010	OL5	Tubs Ross River	Outlaw Bucker Rodeo Company
2011	Jay Bar Nine		Outlaw Bucker Rodeo Company
2012	S-83	Special Delivery	Calgary Stampede
2013	73	True Grit	Vold Rodeo Ltd.
2014	838	Mucho Dinero	Vold Rodeo Ltd.
2015	838	Mucho Dinero	Vold Rodeo Ltd.
2016	717	Must Have	Kesler Rodeo
2017	F13	Virgil	C5 Rodeo
2018	F13	Virgil	C5 Rodeo
2019	118	Stevie Knicks	Northcutt-Macza Rodeo
2021	118	Stevie Knicks	Macza Pro Rodeo
2022	118	OLS Tubs Stevie Knicks	Macza Pro Rodeo
2023	F13	Virgil	Bar C5 Rodeo Company
2024	A-91	Agent Lynx	Calgary Stampede
2025	D-508	Disco Party	Calgary Stampede
2026	D-508	Disco Party	Calgary Stampede

==== Bulls ====
Year	Brand	Name	Stock Contractor
1974	11	Wilfred	Verne Franklin
1975	026	Walter	Reg Kesler
1976	B13		Vold Rodeo
1977	B6		Vold Rodeo
1978	M6	Black Bart	Reg Kesler
1979	V8	Convoy	Northcott Rodeo
1980	514	Hagar	Vold Rodeo
1981	514	Hagar	Vold Rodeo
1982	X1	Charles Manson	Verne Franklin
1983	51	Revelation	Vold Rodeo
1984	X1	Charles Manson	Verne Franklin
1985	55	Panda	Northcutt Rodeo
1986	80	Rambo	Vold Rodeo
1987	80	Rambo	Vold Rodeo
1988	744	Copenhagen Payment	Harvey Nortcutt
1989	744	Copenhagen Payment	Harvey Northcutt
1990	013	Blaster	Wilf Girletz
1991	00	Double Ott	Wilf Girletz
1992	S1	Copenhagen Redip	Harvey Northcutt
1993	R5	Sugar Ray Skoal	Vold Rodeo Ltd.
1994	8	Trick or Treat Skoal	Harvey Northcutt
1995	8	Trick or Treat Skoal	Harvey Northcutt
1996	B12	Kodiak Copenhagen	Harvey Northcutt
1997	214	Short Fuse	Harvey Northcutt
1998	220	White Lightning	Girletz Rodeo
1999	B21	Walk On	Girletz Rodeo
2000	56	Tad Pole Skoal	Franklin Rodeo Company
2001	S14	Assassin	Big Stone Rodeo
2002	518	Funky Chicken Dip	Harvey Northcutt
2003	H35	Final Fantasy	Girletz Rodeo
2004	G31	Heaven on Earth	Girletz Rodeo
2005	M71	Whirly Gig	Big Stone Rodeo Company
2006	L74	Fine Line	Peters & Sons Rodeo Company
2007	220	Rip N' Dip	Girletz Rodeo
2008	308	Spoon Full of Sugar	Big Stone Rodeo
2009	C-301	Speed Dial	Calgary Stampede
2010	C-301	Speed Dial	Calgary Stampede
2011	400	VJV Slash	Vold Rodeo Company
2012		Whiskey Jack	Vold Rodeo Company
2013	T22	Red Stag	Outlaw Buckers Rodeo Corp.
2014	736	Up Tight	Outlaw Buckers Rodeo Corp.
2015	45	Seven Dust	Big Stone Rodeo Co.
2016	127	Cooper's Comet	Vold Rodeo Ltd.
2017	105	Johnny Ringo	Vold Rodeo Ltd.
2018	201	Night Moves	Calgary Stampede
2019	222	Blackstone Afterparty	Outlaw Buckers Rodeo Corp
2021	545	Timber Jam	Vold Rodeo
2022	731	Alberta Prime Devil's Advocate	Kesler Championship Rodeo
2023	715	American Hats Chester	Duane Kesler Championship Rodeo
2024	715	Rodgers Red Angus Chester	Duane Kesler Championship Rodeo
2025	731	Alberta Prime Devil's Advocate	Duane Kesler Championship Rodeo
2026	116	All Gold Rolex	Vold Rodeo

=== Canadian Finals Rodeo ===
==== Top Stock Awards ====
Year	Roughstock Type	Name	Stock Contractor
1985	Saddle Bronc	Guilty Cat	Calgary Stampede
1985	Bareback Bronc	Tom T	Bruce Fleming
1985	Bareback Bronc	Diamond Jim	Vold Rodeo
1985	Bucking Bull	Rambo	Vold Rodeo
1986	Saddle Bronc	Go Wild	Calgary Stampede
1986	Bareback Bronc	Summer Winds	Verne Franklin
1986	Bucking Bull	Hagar Jr.	Vold Rodeo
1987	Saddle Bronc	Kloud Grey Skoal	Calgary Stampede
1987	Bareback Bronc	Devil's Triangle	Harvey Northcutt
1987	Bucking Bull	Hagar Jr.	Vold Rodeo
1988	Saddle Bronc	Papa Smurf Skoal	Calgary Stampede
1988	Saddle Bronc	Lonesome Me Skoal	Calgary Stampede
1988	Bareback Bronc	Kingsway Skoal	Verne Franklin
1988	Bucking Bull	Payment	Harvey Northcutt
1989	Saddle Bronc	Lonesome Me Skoal	Calgary Stampede
1989	Bareback Bronc	High Chaparral Copenhagen	Bar T Rodeo
1989	Bucking Bull	Copenhagen Payment	Harvey Northcutt
1990	Saddle Bronc	Lonesome Me Skoal	Calgary Stampede
1990	Bareback Bronc	Kingsway Skoal	Verne Franklin
1990	Bucking Bull	Jungle Cat	Barry Quam Rodeo
1991	Saddle Bronc	Lonesome Me Skoal	Calgary Stampede
1991	Bareback Bronc	Kingsway Skoal	Verne Franklin
1991	Bucking Bull	Double Ott	Wilf Girletz
1992	Saddle Bronc	Kingsway Skoal	Verne Franklin
1992	Bareback Bronc	High Chaparral Copenhagen	Bar T Rodeo
1992	Bucking Bull	Jungle James	Barry Quam Rodeo
1993	Saddle Bronc	Kingsway Skoal	Verne Franklin
1993	Bareback Bronc	Three Stars Skoal	Reg Kesler
1993	Bucking Bull	Sugar Ray Skoal	Vold Rodeo Ltd
1994	Saddle Bronc	Skoal's Knotts Landing	Greg Kesler
1994	Bareback Bronc	Skoal Weekend Warrior	Vold Rodeo
1994	Bucking Bull	Sugar Ray Skoal	Vold Rodeo
1995	Saddle Bronc	Kingsway Skoal	Verne Franklin
1995	Bareback Bronc	Spit!re	Kesler Championship Rodeo
1995	Bucking Bull	Cattleman's Q91	B & S Livestock
1996	Saddle Bronc	Wyatt Earp Skoal	Harvey Northcott
1996	Bareback Bronc	Skoal's Blue Ridge	Verne Franklin
1996	Bucking Bull	Kodiak Copenhagen	Harvey Northcutt
1997	Saddle Bronc	Wyatt Earp Skoal	Harvey Northcutt
1997	Bareback Bronc	Clover Alley	Kesler Championship Rodeo
1997	Bucking Bull	White Lightning	Girletz Rodeo
1998	Saddle Bronc	Collect Call	Kesler Championship Rodeo
1998	Bareback Bronc	Chester Skoal Bandit	Big Stone Rodeo Company
1998	Bucking Bull	White Lightning Dodge	Girletz Rodeo
1999	Saddle Bronc	Skoal's Painted Smile	Kesler Rodeo
1999	Bareback Bronc	Chester Skoal Bandit	Big Stone Rodeo Company
1999	Bucking Bull	Heat	Vold Rodeo Ltd.
2000	Saddle Bronc	Skoal's Painted Smile	Kesler Rodeo
2000	Bareback Bronc	Major Cat	Vold Rodeo Company
2000	Bucking Bull	Millennium	Girletz Rodeo
2001	Saddle Bronc	Skoal's Painted Smile	Kesler Rodeo
2001	Bareback Bronc	Cool Alley	Kesler Championship Rodeo
2001	Bucking Bull	Lights Out	Girletz Rodeo
2002	Saddle Bronc	Shady Cat	Kesler Championship Rodeo
2002	Bareback Bronc	Chester Skoal Bandit	Big Stone Rodeo Company
2002	Bucking Bull	Outlaw	Calgary Stampede
2003	Saddle Bronc	Breakdance	Kesler Rodeo Company
2003	Bareback Bronc	Chester	Big Stone Rodeo Company
2003	Bucking Bull	Final Fantasy	Girletz Rodeo Stock
2004	Saddle Bronc	Cool Alley	Kesler Championship Rodeo
2004	Bareback Bronc	Grated Coconut	Calgary Stampede
2004	Bucking Bull	The Rock	Vold Rodeo Ltd.
2005	Saddle Bronc	War Cry	Big Country Rodeo
2005	Bareback Bronc	Grated Coconut	Calgary Stampede
2005	Bucking Bull	Shiver N' Shake	Kesler Rodeo Company
2006	Saddle Bronc	War Cry	Big Country Rodeo
2006	Bareback Bronc	Pop a Top	Franklin Rodeo Company
2006	Bucking Bull	Garfield	Franklin Rodeo Company
2007	Saddle Bronc	Blue Too	Franklin Rodeo Company
2007	Bareback Bronc	Grated Coconut	Calgary Stampede
2007	Bucking Bull	Rip N' Dip	Girletz Rodeo
2008	Saddle Bronc	Miss Congenialty	Peters & Sons
2008	Bareback Bronc	Grated Coconut	Calgary Stampede
2008	Bucking Bull	McLovin	Peters and Sons
2009	Saddle Bronc	Get Smart	Northcott Rodeo
2009	Bareback Bronc	Grated Coconut	Calgary Stampede
2009	Bucking Bull	Slash	Vold Rodeo
2010	Saddle Bronc	Get Smart	Northcott Rodeo
2010	Bareback Bronc	Eclipse	Vold Rodeo
2010	Bucking Bull	Slash	Vold Rodeo
2011	Saddle Bronc	Big Muddy	Big Stone Rodeo
2011	Bareback Bronc	Tar Baby	Big Stone Rodeo
2011	Bucking Bull	Slash	Vold Rodeo Inc.
2012	Saddle Bronc	Shoshone Mountain	Calgary Stampede
2012	Bareback Bronc	Street Dance	Kesler Rodeo Company
2012	Bucking Bull	Whiskey Jack	Kesler Rodeo Company
2013	Saddle Bronc	Eclypce	Vold Rodeo Company
2013	Bareback	Western Star	Kesler Rodeo Company
2013	Bucking Bull	Pop Evil	Big Stone Rodeo Company
2014	Saddle Bronc	Lunatic Party	Outlaw Buckers Rodeo Corporation
2014	Bareback Bronc	Unfortunate Karma	Calgary Stampede
2014	Bucking Bull	Proper Ripped	Vold Rodeo Inc.
2015	Saddle Bronc	Tiger Warrior	Calgary Stampede
2015	Bareback Bronc	Virgil	C5 Rodeo
2015	Bucking Bull	Moto Moto	Girletz Rodeo
2016	Saddle Bronc	Wild Cherry	Calgary Stampede
2016	Bareback Bronc	Virgil	C5 Rodeo
2016	Bucking Bull	VJV Nailed	Vold Rodeo
2017	Saddle Bronc	Wild Cherry	Calgary Stampede
2017	Bareback Bronc	Virgil	C5 Rodeo
2017	Bucking Bull	Flight Plan	Kesler Rodeo
2018	Saddle Bronc	Get Smart	Northcutt/Macza
2018	Bareback Bronc	Virgil	C5 Rodeo
2018	Bucking Bull	Wicked Dreams	Vold Rodeo
2019	Saddle Bronc	Get Smart	Northcott-Macza Rodeo
2019	Bareback Bronc	Sundance Kid	Kesler Championship Rodeo
2019	Bucking Bull	Blackstone After Party	Rodeo Corp
2021	Saddle Bronc	Wild Cherry	Calgary Stampede
2021	Bareback Bronc	Agent Lynx	Calgary Stampede
2021	Bucking Bull	Train Wreck	Sawyer Pro Rodeo
2022	Saddle Bronc	OLS Tubs Get Smart	Macza Pro Rodeo
2022	Bareback Bronc	OLS Tubs Stevie Knicks	Macza Pro Rodeo
2022	Bucking Bull	Chester	Kesler Championship Rodeo
2023	Saddle Bronc	Wild Cherry	Calgary Stampede
2023	Bareback Bronc	Stevie Knicks	Macza Pro Rodeo
2023	Bucking Bull	Blue Magic	Outlaw Buckers
2024	Saddle Bronc	Mary Lou	Northcott-Yule
2024	Bareback Bronc	Virgil	C5 Rodeo
2024	Bucking Bull	Chico	Vold Rodeo
2025	Saddle Bronc	Crocket	Calgary Stampede
2025	Bareback Bronc	OLS Tubs Stevie Knicks	Macza Rodeo
2025	Bucking Bull	Splash Tide	Vold Rodeo
2026	Saddle Bronc	Falkland Playboy	Macza Rodeo
2026	Bareback Bronc	Stevie Nicks	Macza Rodeo
2026	Bucking Bull	Hang Loose	Duffy Rodeo

=== Timed-Event Horses of the Year ===
==== Tie-Down Roping Horse ====
Year	Name	Stock Contractor
1979	Lucky	Larry Robinson
1980	Yankee	Bill Reeder
1981	Lucky	Larry Robinson
1982	Yankee	Bill Reeder
1983	Weasel	Joe Lucas
1984	Digger	Greg Cassidy
1985	Fred	Larry Robinson
1986	Fred	Larry Robinson
1987	Duffer	Larry Robinson/Joe Lucas
1988	Turbo	Marty Becker
1989	Jack	Tim Williamson
1990	Jack	Tim Williamson
1991	Vance	Joe Butterfield
1992	Dude	Darren Zieffle
1993	Turbo	Marty Becker
1994	Fred	Larry Robinson
1995	Jake	Joe Butterfield
1996	Crown	Greg Cassidy
1997	Buttermilk	Jim Cooper
1998	Barbie	Troy Houff
1999	Crown	Greg Cassidy
2000	Joe	Guy Smith
2001	Joe	Guy Smith
2002	Salty	Cliff Williamson
2003	Salty	Cllff Williamson
2004	Little Joe	Guy Smith/Clark Hughson
2005	Sid	Dean Edge
2006	Sid	Dean Edge
2007	Sid	Dean Edge
2008	Sid	Dean Edge
2009	Pincher	Chad Johnson
2010	Stick	Curtis Cassidy
2011	Rocky	Murray Pole
2012	Pincher	Chad Johnson
2013	Sid	Dean Edge
2014	Sid	Dean Edge
2015	Sid	Dean Edge
2016	TJ	Logan Bird
2017	Clyde	Erik Dublanko
2018	Stick	Curtis Cassidy
2019	TJ	Logan Bird
2021	Peso	Logan Bird
2022	Peso	Logan Bird
2023	Moon	Shane Smith
2024	Peso	Logan Bird
2025	Peso	Logan Bird
2026	Lincoln	Tyler Popescul

==== Steer Wrestling Horse of the Year ====
Year	Name	Stock Contractor
1979	Twist	Wes Zieffle
1980	Duce	Lee Phillips/Ron Ostrom
1981	Twist	Wes Zieffle
1982	Twist	Wes Zieffle
1983	Twist	Wes Zieffle
1984	Twist	Wes Zieffle
1985	Duce	Lee Phillips/Ron Ostrom
1986	Duce	Lee Phillips/Ron Ostrom
1987	Duce	Lee Phillips/Ron Ostrom
1988	Duce	Lee Phillips/Ron Ostrom
1988	Steamboat	Blaine Pederson
1989	Chico	D. Wilkinson/Lois King
1990	Chico	D. Wilkinson/Lois King
1991	Chico	D. Wilkinson/Lois King
1992	Porky	Blaine Pederson
1993	Bailey	John and David Gibson
1994	Bones	Mark Roy
1995	Dino	Bill Maughan
1996	Trapper	Daryl Lausen/David Roy
1997	Tuffy	Leon Laye
1998	Rooster	Lee Graves
1999	Rusty	BJ Zieffle
2000	Indy	Todd Woodward
2001	Happi	Jeremy Harden
2002	Willy	Greg Cassidy
2003	Willy	Greg Cassidy
2004	Hammer	Lee Laskosky
2005	Willy	Greg Cassidy
2006	Willy	Greg Cassidy
2007	Willy	Greg Cassidy
2008	Wrangler	Curtis Cassidy
2009	Willy	Greg Cassidy
2010	Deuce	Curtis Cassidy
2011	Peggy Sue	Murray Milan
2012	Pistol	Clayton Moore
2013	Jessie	Lee Graves
2014	Itzy	Scott Guenthner
2015	Tank	Dustin Walker
2016	Tank	Dustin Walker
2017	Smoke	Tanner Milan
2018	Tyson	Curtis Cassidy
2019	Tyson	Curtis Cassidy
2021	Tyson	Curtis Cassidy
2022	Tyson	Curtis Cassidy
2023	Eddie	Tanner Milan
2024	Tyson	Curtis Cassidy
2025	Tyson	Curtis Cassidy
2026	Tyson	Curtis Cassidy

==== Barrel Racing Horse with the Most Heart ====
Year	Name	Stock Contractor
1988	Doc	Ruth McDougall
1989	Doc	Ruth McDougall
1990	Doc	Ruth McDougall
1991	Tia	Rayel Robinson
1992	Tia	Rayel Robinson
1993	Awesome	L. Schlosser
1994	Tundra	R. & R. Walter
1995	Racey	Joan Hager
1996	M & M	Dawn Rude
1997	Awesome	L. Schlosser
1998	Buck	D. Guelly (Renger)
1999	Giz	Monica Wilson
2000	Buck	Debbie Renger
2001	Chick	Jill Besplug
2002	Mr. T	Carol Barr
2003	Skeeter	Brooke Ramsey
2004	Debt Adjuster	Dena Millard
2005	Guy	Joleen Seitz
2006	Guy	Joleen Seitz
2007	CJ	Sierra Stoney
2008	Foxy	Traci Dawson
2009	Reiner	Deb Renger
2010	Real Easy Doc	Rana Koopmans
2011	Foxy	Traci MacDonald
2012	Leaguer Moon	Cranna Roberts
2013	Frenchie	Katie Garthwaite
2014	Rootie	Britany Diaz
2015	Wicked	Nancy Csabay
2016	Racey	Kirsty White
2017	Ripp	Carman Pozzobon
2018	Ripn Lady	Carman Pozzobon
2019	Blondys Starlight	Justine Elliott
2021	Blondys Starlight	Justine Elliott
2022	Hot Donna	Shelby Spielman
2023	Cowboy	Lynette Brodoway
2024	Famey	Brooke Wills
2025	Whiskey	Jayden Wilson
2026	Queen Flingtima	Karlie Cowie

==== Team Roping Horses of the Year ====
Year	Horse and Type	Stock Contractor
2009	Roller (heading)	Murray Linthicum
2009	Bucky (heeling)	Dwight Wigemyr
2010	Shadow (heading)	Dale Skocdopole
2010	Ice (heeling)	Scott Auclair
2011	Archie (heading)	Brett McCaroll
2011	Boon (heeling)	Matt Fawcett
2012	Stetson (heading)	Levi Simpson
2012	Dunny (heeling)	Rocky Ross
2013	Badger (heading)	Steele DePaoli
2013	Bam Bam (heeling)	Kasper Roy
2014	Badger (heading)	Kolton Schmidt
2014	Cat Man (heeling)	Chase Simpson
2015	Peggy Sue (heading)	Clay Ulery
2015	Bam Bam (heeling)	Kasper Roy
2016	Badger (heading)	Kolton Schmidt
2016	Rick James (heeling)	Jeremy Buhler
2017	Wrangler (heading)	Roland McFadden
2017	Rick James (heeling)	Jeremy Buhler
2018	Cactus (header)	Tuftin McLeod
2018	Harry (heeling)	Tristan Woolsey
2019	Tito (heading)	Logan Bonnett
2019	Cruz (heeling)	Keely Bonnett
2021	Junior (heading)	Grady Branden
2021	Cruz (heeling)	Keely Bonnett
2022	Tito (heading)	Logan Bonnett
2022	Cruz (heeling)	Keely Bonnett
2023	Outlaw (heading)	Dawson Graham
2023	Cruz (heeling)	Dillon Graham
2024	RB (heading)	Tee McLeod
2024	Hoss (heeling)	Jeremy Buhler
2025	Catfish (heading)	Kavis Drake
2025	Super Chad (heeling)	Kasper Roy
2026	Joe (heading)	Kash Bonnett
2026	Whiz (heeling)	Logan Cullen

==== Breakaway Roping Horse of the Year ====
Year	Name	Stock Contractor
2022	Teacher	Ben Bamford
2023	Teacher	Ben Bamford
2024	Teacher	Ben Bamford
2025	Gummy	Caitlyn Dahm
2026	Hott For Teacher	Bradi Whiteside

==== Hazing Horse of the Year ====
Year	Name	Stock Contractor
2024	Tree Stump	Tanner Milan
2025	Doubles	Custis Cassidy
2026	Doubles	Custis Cassidy

== Discontinued awards ==
=== Horse racing ===
- Gus Gottfriedsen 1945
- Elmo Still 1946
- Cliff Vandergrift 1947
- Frank Eppie 1948
- Cliff Vandergrift 1949
- Cliff Vandergrift 1950
- Bud Van Cleave 1951
- Bud Van Cleave 1952
- Cliff Vandergrift 1953
- Orville Strandquist 1954
- Cliff Vandergrift 1955
- Don McLeod 1956
- Orville Strandquist 1957
- Cliff Vandergrift 1958
- Cliff Vandergrift 1959
- Don McLeod 1960
- Cliff Vandergrift 1961
- Pat McHugh 1962
- Pat McHugh 1963
- Jim Clifford 1964
- Greg Kesler 1965
- Greg Kesler 1966
- Greg Kesler 1967
- Pat McHugh 1968
- Ernie Dorin 1969
- Ernie Dorin 1970
- Ernie Dorin 1971
- Ernie Dorin 1972
- Ernie Dorin 1973
- Ernie Dorin 1974
- Don Copithorne 1975
- Ernie Dorin 1976
- Ernie Dorin 1977
- Ernie Dorin 1978
- Ernie Dorin 1979
- Ernie Dorin 1980
- Ernie Dorin 1981
- Glen Helmig 1982
- Ernie Dorin 1983
- Don Copithorne 1984
- Dale Ashbacher 1985
- Dale Ashbacher 1986
- Duane Ashbacher 1987
- Dale Ashbacher 1988
- Dale Ashbacher 1989
- Dale Ashbacher 1990
- Duane Ashbacher 1991
- Dale Ashbacher 1992
- Jesse Doenz 1993
- Jesse Doenz 1994
- Jesse Doenz 1995
- Jesse Doenz 1996
- Jesse Doenz 1997
- Jesse Doenz 1998
- Dale Belisle 1999
- Dale Belisle 2000
- Dale Belisle 2001
- Dan Brown 2002
- Dale Belisle 2003
- Dale Belisle 2004
- Dale Belisle 2005
- Dan Brown 2006
- Dan Brown 2007
- Richard Quarell 2008
- Mark Sawchuk 2009

=== Cow milking ===
- Padgett Berry 1945
- George Sheline 1946
- Tom Duce 1947
- Fred Gladstone 1948
- Cliff Vandergrift 1949
- Harwood Potter 1950
- John Hauck 1951
- Cliff Vandergrift 1952
- Reg Kesler 1953
- Bill Collins 1954
- George Sutcliff 1955
- Fred Gladstone 1956
- George Sutcliff 1957
- Orville Strandquist 1958
- Alex Laye 1959
- Cliff Vandergrift 1960
- Pat McHugh 1961
- Alex Laye 1962
- Pat McHugh 1963
- Alex Laye 1964
- Wilf Girletz 1965
- Wilf Girletz 1966
- Pat McHugh 1967
- Clark Schlosser 1968
- Pat McHugh 1969
- Allen Currier 1970
- Pat McHugh 1971
- Pat McHugh 1972
- Pat McHugh 1973
- Pat McHugh 1974
- Pat McHugh 1975
- Pat McHugh 1976
- Pat McHugh 1977
- Pat McHugh 1978
- Allen Currier 1979
- Pat McHugh 1980
- Allen Currier 1981
- Allen Currier 1982
- Allen Currier 1983
- Allen Currier 1984
- Keith Smith 1985
- Allen Currier 1986
- Allen Currier 1987
- Bruce Flewelling 1988
- Bruce Flewelling 1989
- Bruce Flewelling 1990
- Duane Ashbacher 1991
- Bruce Flewelling 1992
- Bruce Flewelling 1993
- Bruce Flewelling 1994
- Bruce Flewelling 1995
- Duane Ashbacher 1996
- Todd Munro 1997
- Jim Bowhay 1998
- Doug Boettcher 1999
- Jim Bowhay 2000
- Cary Samulak 2001
- Doug Boettcher 2002
- Jim Bowhay 2003
- Doug Boettcher 2004
- Todd Munro 2005
- Todd Munro 2006
- Todd Munro 2007
- Jim Bowhay 2008
- Carson Bowhay 2009

=== High Point Champion Award ===
- Leo Brown 1960
- George Myren 1961
- Rocky Rockabar 1962
- Leo Brown 1963
- Rocky Rockabar 1964
- Jim Clifford 1965
- Rocky Rockabar 1966
- Kenny McLean 1967
- Kenny McLean 1968

(Discontinued until 1987)

- Greg Cassidy 1987
- Greg Cassidy 1988
- Gerald Willsie 1989
- Steve Dunham 1990
- Joe Lucas 1991
- Joe Lucas 1992
- Blaine Pederson 1993
- Blaine Pederson 1994
- Darren Shaw 1995
- Rod Warren 1996
- Joe Lucas 1997
- Rod Warren 1998
- BJ Zieffle 1999
- Curtis Cassidy 2000
- Curtis Cassidy 2001
- Robert Bowers 2002
- Curtis Cassidy 2003
- Rod Warren 2004
- Lee Graves 2005
- Curtis Cassidy 2006
- Clint Robinson 2007
- Curtis Cassidy 2008
- Kyle Thomson 2009
- Curtis Cassidy 2010
- Curtis Cassidy 2011
- Josh Peek 2012
- Morgan Grant 2013
- Curtis Cassidy 2014
- Curtis Cassidy 2015
- Morgan Grant 2016
- Morgan Grant 2017
- Riley Warren 2018
- Riley Warren 2019
- Riley Warren 2021

=== Rookie of the Year: Barrel racing ===
- Cindy Gamroth 1986
- Lisa Fletcher 1987
- Sylvia Shirley 1988
- Dina Sterr 1989

(not awarded in 1990)

- Leslie Schlosser 1991
- Nikki Ree 1992
- Tracey Schmidt 1993
- Tracy Gulick 1994
- Jackie Scherger 1995
- Traci Creighton 1996
- Hallie Willis 1997
- Jodi Hollingworth 1998
- Sherry Dyck 1999
- Jill Besplug 2000
- Traci Preissl 2001
- Shandel Thomson 2002
- Brooke Ramsay 2003
- Joleen Seitz 2004
- Elaina Black 2005
- Kelly Rycroft 2006
- Janet Moen 2007
- Gaylene Buff 2008
- Adel Hansen 2009
- Diane Skocdopole 2017
- Bertina Olafson 2018
- Stacey Ruzicka 2019

=== Barrel racing Permit Award ===
- Carolyn Metcalfe 1990
- Cheryl Robson 1991
- Kirsty Larocque 1992
- Tracey Schmidt 1993
- Jill Parsonage 1994
- Jackie Scherger 1995
- Tracy Matkea 1996
- Hallie Willis 1997
- Maxine Schneidmiller 1998
- Sherry Dyck 1999
- Jill Besplug 2000
- Traci Preissl 2001
- Brooke Ramsay 2002
- Rylee McKenzie 2003
- Lindsey Edge 2004
- Kendra Edey 2005
- Stacie Chisholm 2006
- Gaileen Babcock 2007
- Melanie Beeton 2008
- Haley Keenan 2009

=== Novice bull riding ===
- Beau Gardner 2023
- Denver Leitch 2024
