= Virgil (bucking horse) =

Rodeo bucking horse

- Discipline: Bareback and Saddle bronc
- Sex: Gelding
- Foaled: 2008
- Country: United States / Canada
- Color: Grey
- Breeder: Dale Kling
- Owner: C5 Rodeo

Virgil F13 (born 2008) is a retired rodeo bucking horse. He specialized in both bareback bronc riding and saddle bronc riding. Although born in North Dakota, United States, he has lived most of his life in Alberta, Canada. Virgil is a three-time Canadian Professional Rodeo Association (CPRA) Bareback Horse of the Year, as well as a two-time Professional Rodeo Cowboys Association (PRCA) Bareback Horse of the Year. He was also awarded the Bareback Horse of the Canadian Finals Rodeo (CFR) five times from 2015 through 2018 and 2024, as well as the Bareback Horse of the National Finals Rodeo (NFR) in 2017 and 2024, and Co-Bareback Horse of the NFR in 2023. He was also the 2025 CPRA Saddle Bronc Horse of the Year, as well as the 2025 PRCA Saddle Bronc Horse of the Year. He is the horse that was ridden for the highest-scored bareback ride in PRCA history, which occurred in 2022.

== Background ==
Virgil was born in 2008, and is a grey gelding. He is the offspring of an 1,800 pound percheron; Big John and a small 900 pound appaloosa mare; Apples. Virgil was born and raised on the Dale Kling ranch in Grassy Butte, North Dakota. Kling gave the owner of the breeding stud Big John to John McNeely as payment for breeding fees, but later sold him as a two-year-old to Maury Tate at the 2010 Dale Kling's Breeders Classic bucking horse sale in Cody, Wyoming. Maury sold him to Vern McDonald in Lac La Biche, Alberta. He is owned by C5 Rodeo. "I paid a lot of money for him, but he got me a lot of rodeos," confessed Verne McDonald. He also won some trucks and four bareback awards.

== Career ==
In 2018, multi-time PRCA world champion bareback bronc rider Kaycee Feild rode Virgil at the American Rodeo in Arlington, Texas. He rode Virgil to a winning round and a check for $433,333.

Richie Champion made a winning ride on Virgil at the Ponoka Stampede. He also made a winning ride at the 2017 Calgary Stampede. "We've all walked up there and been like, "Alright, gimme the grey,'" said Champion of the award-winning horse. "To reach in there and (draw him) … just … thank you, God. It's just crazy, you know? There's no rhyme or reason to snag him out of there. I'm a firm believer you draw what you're supposed to get on. I've been lucky to get on Virgil every time." He rode Virgil for 92.5 points, beating the next rider's score of 92 points.

At one NFR, in the 3rd round, Tim O'Connell was waiting a bit anxiously for his turn to ride Virgil. He had prepared to the best of his ability. After the ride was over, the score was 91.5 points. The scoreboard lit up a 91.5 point score for the fifth time in the history of the NFR. Bobby Mote was the last to do it. Twice, in 2008. "A world champion on a world champion at the NFR," Tim noted. "That's hard to top, especially when it works out the way it did."

In July, Jake Vold rode Virgil for 90.75 points in Ponoka, Alberta. That ride was the fourth highest score on bareback in 2017. Virgil bucked off Vold at the Canadian Finals Rodeo recently. In August, at Lynden, Washington, Austin Foss rode Virgil for 88 points to win. "He's a horse that bucks every time," Foss told the PRCA. "If a guy is doing his job you're going to win on him every time. That combo makes him obviously the riders' choice."

In January 2020, Will Lowe, a three-time bareback riding world champion had an accident on Virgil. At the National Western Stock Show in Denver, Colorado, he spurred the horse four times, but then stopped and appeared to be trying to hang on. His hand was caught in the rigging. One of Virgil's hooves knocked him in the face. Once on the ground, the Justin Sports Medicine Team was assisting him. To everyone's relief, he was able to get up with assistance. Word came later that he had a facial laceration and trauma to his orbital bone. However, he would recover fine.

At the 2021 NFR, during Round 8, Layton Green scored 91 points riding Virgil. "It's awesome," said Green regarding this first-round win. "It's a really good horse, C5's (Rodeo) Virgil, and I don't know how many go-rounds they have won on him here, but I know it's quite a few in the bareback riding and the first one in the (saddle) bronc riding. That horse is everything a guy could ask for, big, strong, and really bucked today. Just super happy."

In 2021, Virgil was ridden a few times. Some of those rides resulted in 90-point scores. On April 25, at the Clovis Rodeo in Clovis, California, Tilden Hooper rode him. On March 7, at the American Rodeo, Cole Reiner rode him. Saddle bronc rider Lefty Holman rode him at the Spanish Fork Fiesta Day Rodeo in Spanish Fork, Utah. He had an arena record 90.5 point ride on Virgil. C5 Rodeo was trying their bareback horse as a saddle bronc this year. "He's a phenomenal horse. He's big and strong . . . he's a big, intimidating sucker," Holman said of the 1,600-pound horse. "I was just the third guy to ride him with a saddle. I watched my good buddy Colt Gordon get on him and Rusty (Wright)." Both riders hit dirt, and Holman knew they would. Holman needed the win, and he earned 8,234.

On June 5, 2022, history was made when Virgil was ridden by Rocker Steiner (grandson of 1973 PRCA World Champion bull rider Bobby Steiner and son of 2002 PRCA World Champion steer wrestler Sid Steiner) in the championship round of that year's PRCA Xtreme Broncs Riggin' Rally in Darby, Montana. Not only did Steiner win the event, but he won it by riding Virgil for 95 points; the highest-scored bareback ride in PRCA history. The previous record was 94 points, which was set six times, beginning in 2002.

In 2024, another bareback rider won the Calgary Stampede title on Virgil. This time it was R.C. Landingham, who scored 94 points on the horse in the four-man short round. "Man, that's an outstanding bucking horse. There might not ever be another one like him but it took me 15 years to draw him and today, I get to walk up here and pick him, you know, I'd never miss out on that opportunity so it worked out the way I thought," Landingham said. After cinching a win earlier that year on Virgil, Landingham knew what was in store with the big gray. "Today he dang sure bucked hard and he was testing me a lot more but I just kept gassing it. I knew that if I got to the whistle we were going to win first so just don’t give up on me," he said.

In 2024, Virgil was ridden by Zeke Thurston at his own saddle bronc riding event, the Zeke Thurston Invitational Xtreme Broncs in Stettler, Alberta, to win the event. In 2025, at the same event, Virgil was ridden by Wyatt Casper, also for the event win. Zeke Thurston won the 2025 Calgary Stampede by riding Virgil for 92.5 points.

Virgil was retired following the 2025 NFR.

=== Summary ===
Virgil's high score for 2018 was 91.5 points out of a possible 100 points. His average stock score was 45 points from a possible 50 points. He weighs 1,600 pounds. He has won three Bareback Horse of the Year awards from the CPRA and two from the PRCA, as well as two Saddle Bronc Horse of the Year awards, one from the CPRA and one from the PRCA. He has also won three trucks, and won two riders the Calgary Stampede bareback riding title. He was ridden for 94 points at RodeoHouston.

== Awards ==
- 2015-2018, 2024 Bareback Horse of the CFR
- 2017, 2024 Bareback Horse of the NFR
- 2017-2018, 2023 CPRA Bareback Horse of the Year
- 2017-2018 PRCA Bareback Horse of the Year
- 2023 Co-Bareback Horse of the NFR w/ Gun Fire
- 2025 CPRA Saddle Bronc Horse of the Year
- 2025 PRCA Saddle Bronc Horse of the Year
