= Grated Coconut (horse) =

Canadian bareback horse (1997–2024)

- Discipline: Bareback bronc
- Sex: Stallion
- Foaled: 1997
- Died: 2024
- Country: Canada
- Breeder: Calgary Stampede
- Owner: Calgary Stampede

Honors
- ProRodeo Hall of Fame; Canadian Pro Rodeo Hall of Fame; Ellensburg Rodeo Hall of Fame

Grated Coconut #G-65 (1997–2024) was a Canadian rodeo bucking horse that was specialized in bareback bronc riding. He was a six-time Professional Rodeo Cowboys Association (PRCA) Bareback Horse of the Year (2003, 2004, 2006, 2007, 2008, and 2009). He was also a six-time Canadian Professional Rodeo Association (CPRA) Bareback Horse of the Year from (2003, 2004, 2005, 2007, 2008, and 2009). He was inducted into three halls of fame, including the ProRodeo Hall of Fame of the PRCA, the Canadian Pro Rodeo Hall of Fame of the CPRA, and the Ellensburg Rodeo Hall of Fame of the PRCA-sanctioned Ellensburg Rodeo.

== Early life ==
Grated Coconut was born in 1997 on the Calgary Stampede Ranch. He was a dark bay stallion with a white blaze and two white stockings on his back feet. Grated Coconut came out of the Born to Buck Breeding Program at the Ranch in Hanna, Alberta. He was sired by Wyatt Earp of Northcott Road and was out of Coconut Roll. His sire, Wyatt Earp, was voted Saddle Bronc Horse of the PRCA's National Finals Rodeo (NFR) in 1997 and 1998. His mother, Coconut Roll, qualified for the NFR ten times. His sire was also a Canadian Pro Rodeo Hall of Fame inductee in 2010.

== Career ==
Davey Shields Jr. scored 95 points on the stallion and won $50,000 at the Calgary Stampede in Calgary, Alberta, in 2005. In early 2008, Dusty LaValley was 91 points on him at the National Western Stock Show in Denver, Colorado. Later that same year, Steven Dent set an arena record at the Caldwell Night Rodeo in Caldwell, Idaho, with a 91-point ride on Grated Coconut.

=== Summary ===
Grated Coconut had 114 outs in his career. He bucked off 37 cowboys. He was ridden by 25 cowboys. Another 29 cowboys rode him to finish in the money. Cowboys most often won some money if they could stay aboard him for eight seconds. Coconut's abilities in the arena earned him six PRCA Bareback Horse of the Year titles from 2003 to 2004, and from 2006 to 2009. The six titles tied him another great bucking horse, Descent. He also earned six CPRA Bareback Horse of the Year titles from 2003 to 2005, and from 2007 to 2009.

== Awards and honors ==
- 6-time PRCA Bareback Horse of the Year (2003, 2004, 2006, 2007, 2008, 2009)
- 6-time CPRA Bareback Horse of the Year (2003, 2004, 2005, 2007, 2008, 2009)
- 5-time Bareback Horse of the Canadian Finals Rodeo (CFR) (2004, 2005, 2007, 2008, 2009)
- 2008 Bareback Horse of the NFR
- 2012 Canadian Pro Rodeo Hall of Fame
- 2013 Ellensburg Rodeo Hall of Fame
- 2020 ProRodeo Hall of Fame

== Retirement and death ==
The Calgary Stampede Ranch retired Grated Coconut in 2010. He served as the highest level of animal ambassador. They bred him, and as many as 45 of his progeny have competed at the highest level of rodeo with several qualifying for the NFR and CFR.

Grated Coconut died on the Calgary Stampede Ranch near Hanna, Alberta, in January 2024.

== Pedigree ==
Edit
Wyatt Earp
Miss Kitty 3
Grated Coconut
Wildstrawberry NFR
Coconut Roll
Rolly Polly
