= Dusty LaValley =

Canadian bareback rider (1981–2026)

- Born: May 30, 1981; Grande Prairie, Alberta, Canada
- Died: August 2, 2026 (aged 45)
- Occupation: Bareback rider
- Children: 2

Dusty LaValley (May 30, 1981 – August 2, 2026) was a Canadian professional rodeo cowboy who specialized in bareback bronc riding.

== Early life and career ==
LaValley was born in Grande Prairie, Alberta on May 30, 1981. In 2000, he competed at the Rodeo Royal in Calgary, Alberta, and in 2004, he was named the PRCA Resistol Rookie of the Year in bareback riding.

In 2008, he competed at the National Western Stock Show and Rodeo in Denver, Colorado. He competed at the National Finals Rodeo (NFR) in 2008 and 2010. In 2009, he competed at the Grande Prairie Stompede, placing second in the bareback riding event. He competed at the Canadian Finals Rodeo (CFR) thirteen times, and won the CPRA bareback riding national championship four times (2006, 2007, 2010, and 2011).

In 2022, LaValley was inducted into the Canadian Pro Rodeo Hall of Fame.

== Personal life and death ==
LaValley had two children, and in 2022, he was diagnosed with ALS. He died from the disease on August 2, 2026, at the age of 45.
