= Elaine Watt (barrel racer) =

Canadian barrel racer

- Born: Elaine Stewart; 1956 (age 68–69); Manitoba, Canada
- Occupation(s): School teacher, rodeo contestant
- Years active: 1967–1990

Elaine Watt (born 1957) is a Canadian physical education instructor and barrel racer. She was a three-time Canadian barrel racing champion, in 1978, 1979, and 1982. She was inducted into the Canadian Pro Rodeo Hall of Fame in 2012.

== Early life ==
Elaine Stewart was born in 1956 in Manitoba, Canada, to Mavis (née Bowler) and Calvin Stewart. She had four siblings, Alvin, John, Colleen, and Carol. Their father raised horses and all of the children helped with farm chores at their home in Saint Pierre, Manitoba. Both of her sisters competed in rodeo events and Carol would later succeed her sister, Elaine, with the Canadian barrel racing title in 1983. She began riding when she was six years old and training in 1967 when her father took her 4-H group to a horse clinic in Manitoba. She trained with Elaine and Jim Hyde and won a junior title in Minnesota in her first competition, which was later that year.

== Career ==
While training at the Hyde's ranch in Alida, Saskatchewan, Stewart met professional calf roper, Neil Watt. In 1972, she began riding in the Canadian Rodeo Cowboys Association during the summer vacation from her job as a physical education teacher in Beausejour, Manitoba. In 1976, after winning the barrel racing event at the Royal Manitoba Winter Fair Light Horse Show, Stewart and Watt married. Watt won the Canadian barrel racing championship in 1978, taking first place with a score of 170 points, placing in all six rounds at the Canadian Finals Rodeo. She repeated as Canadian champion in 1979 and 1982. Though she contemplated competing for the world championship, she would have had to give up teaching to focus on competition.

In the early 1980s, the couple moved from Manitoba to Raymond, Alberta, where Watt continued teaching. In addition to competing in Canada, she and her husband participated in events in the United States, in western states like Colorado, Idaho, Montana, Nebraska, Nevada and Utah. In 1988 and 1989, she served as president of the Canadian Girls Rodeo Association. In 2012, she was inducted into the Canadian Pro Rodeo Hall of Fame.
