= Dirty Jacket =

American bucking horse

- Discipline: Bareback and saddle bronc
- Sire: Night Jacket
- Dam: Dirty
- Sex: Gelding
- Foaled: 2004
- Country: United States
- Owner: Pete Carr Pro Rodeo

Honors
- 2014 and 2015 PRCA Bareback Horse of the Year; 2024 Texas Rodeo Cowboy Hall of Fame

Dirty Jacket #474 (b. 2004) is an American retired rodeo bucking horse that was specialized in bareback and saddle bronc riding. He competed in the Professional Rodeo Cowboys Association (PRCA) and won the 2014 and 2015 PRCA Bareback Horse of the Year award. In 2024, he was inducted into the Texas Rodeo Cowboy Hall of Fame.

== Background ==
Dirty Jacket was foaled in 2004 by Night Jacket and out of Dirty. He is a bay gelding. This bronc is well known for his bucking style and manner of rearing out of the chute. He was purchased by Pete Carr Pro Rodeo around 2–3 years old.

== Career ==
On July 30, 2019, at the Eagle County Fair & Rodeo, Rusty Wright matched up with Dirty Jacket for a 91-point score. Wright dealt with some anticipation prior to the ride due to the reputation of this horse. Horses of Dirty Jacket's calibre spend time in the TV pen at the National Finals Rodeo (NFR), which is meant for rank horses.

Dirty Jacket bucked at the NFR every year since 2009. He was a two-time PRCA Bareback Horse of the Year. He won the award in 2014 and 2015. In 2019, his owners began to use him for saddle bronc riding as well. He continued his high-score career in this new event.

In 2014, when Dirty Jacket won his first bareback award, he was 10 years old. He also won the second place award the year before (2013) and the third place the year before that (2012). His owner, Pete Carr, was hoping he would just make the top three. Carr was honored when he came in first. His reservations were due to the fact that the horse had been injured at the San Antonio Stock Show and Rodeo on February 22. Nearly six months later, the horse returned on July 27 and competed at Cheyenne Frontier Days in Cheyenne, Wyoming. The horse never lost a step; Richmond Champion had a 91-point ride on him to win the finals and the average.

According to some cowboys, Dirty Jacket is the greatest bucking bronc. At the 2014 NFR, the horse was the main reason that two cowboys won their go-rounds at the Thomas & Mack Center. First, Richmond Campion won the fifth round, and Caleb Bennett won the tenth round. "There's not another horse like him", said Champion. "Dirty Jacket might’ve even looked better than he did that day in Cheyenne". The fifth and tenth rounds rounds claimed the best horses in rodeo. And yet, Dirty Jacket shined amongst them. "There wasn't a bad horse in the pen, but to have Dirty Jacket again at the NFR and to win the round was awesome", Champion said. "There's not another night that you get to walk down the alley with that caliber of horse standing all next to each other."

Champion's 91-point ride in Cheyenne was one of two highmarked rides. Steven Dent was the other 91-point ride. He rode Dirty Jacket at the Cowboy Capital of the World Rodeo in Stephenville, Texas in September. "Any time you can draw one that everybody wants, you're happy with it whether you're in that situation or it's a regular-season rodeo," said Dent, a 7-time NFR qualifier from Mullen, Nebraska. "You don't have the opportunity to get on a horse that you can be that many points on and that's fun to get on very often in your life, much less the last week of the year when you're trying to make the NFR. That is a really great horse. There are not very many of them like him that do it every time, that are that electric, jump that high in the air and that you can be that many points on." According to these cowboys, the horse is a topnotch, consistent, and athletic competitor.

Pete Carr Pro Rodeo announced that 2025 was Dirty Jacket's final year as a bucking horse.

== Awards ==
- 2013 PRCA Reserve Bareback Horse of the Year
- 2014 PRCA Bareback Horse of the Year
- 2015 PRCA Bareback Horse of the Year
- 2024 Texas Rodeo Cowboy Hall of Fame
