= The Cowboy Channel Canada =

- The Cowboy Channel Canada logo
- Country: Canada
- Broadcast area: National
- Headquarters: Edmonton, Alberta

Programming
- Picture format: 1080i (HDTV)

Ownership
- Owner: Wild TV Inc.
- Sister channels: RFD-TV Canada; Water Television Network; Wild TV

History
- Launched: February 1, 2020 (6 years ago)

Links
- Website: thecowboychannel.ca

The Cowboy Channel Canada is a Canadian English language licence-exempted specialty channel broadcasting programming dedicated to western sports and the western lifestyle airing programs such as rodeo, bull riding, team roping, reining, barrel racing, and other western sports genres, along with western fashion, music, and movies. The channel is owned by Ryan Kohler through Wild TV Inc.

== History ==
The channel launched on February 1, 2020, on Shaw Direct television systems in high definition through a partnership with Rural Media Group, licensing the brand and majority of its content from its U.S. counterpart, The Cowboy Channel.

Logo used from 2020 to early 2022

In 2023, Rural Media Group signed a multi-year agreement with the Canadian Professional Rodeo Association to telecast and stream their major events, including the Canadian Finals Rodeo, on The Cowboy Channel Canada through December 31, 2027.
