= Glen Keeley (bull rider) =

Canadian bull rider (1970-2000)

- Born: March 20, 1970; Nanton, Alberta, Canada
- Died: March 24, 2000 (aged 30); Albuquerque, New Mexico, United States
- Occupation: Professional bull rider
- Years active: 1989–2000

Glen Keeley (March 20, 1970 – March 24, 2000) was a Canadian professional rodeo cowboy who specialized in bull riding. He competed in the Canadian Professional Rodeo Association (CPRA), Professional Rodeo Cowboys Association (PRCA), Bull Riders Only (BRO), and Professional Bull Riders (PBR) circuits. He won the CPRA national bull riding championship in 1989.

Keeley was the first bull rider to die from injuries sustained at a PBR event.

== Life and career ==
Glen Keeley was born on March 20, 1970 in Nanton, Alberta.

In 1983 he won the CPRA national steer riding championship at the age of 13.

In 1989 he won the CPRA national bull riding championship at the age of 19.

His brother Jason, also a bull rider, was nearly killed in a bull-riding wreck in 1994, but made a full recovery.

Glen qualified several times for the CPRA's year-end Canadian Finals Rodeo (CFR). His lone qualification to the PRCA's year-end National Finals Rodeo (NFR) was in 1993. He also made a couple of trips to the BRO Finals, and competed at the inaugural PBR World Finals in 1994.

He had competed sporadically in the PBR, but by 2000, was riding there full-time. He had numerous top finishes on the Bud Light Cup Tour early in the year (including a 4th place finish in St. Louis, Missouri, and a tie for 2nd in Phoenix, Arizona) and was well on his way to qualify for his second PBR World Finals.

== Death ==
On March 24, 2000, four days after his 30th birthday, Keeley was competing at the PBR Bud Light Cup's Ty Murray Invitational, the annual event then held at Tingley Coliseum in Albuquerque, New Mexico. It was the first round and Keeley drew the bull Promiseland, who was the 1999 PBR Bull of the Year and owned by Terry Williams. During the ride, Keeley was bucked off, landed under the bull's hooves and was stomped on. He broke his left arm and evidently had some internal injuries, but managed to walk out of the arena on his own.

Keeley had been talking and joking with the nurses when he arrived at the hospital. At five feet, seven inches tall, he was one of the smaller riders on the Bud Light Cup Tour. By contrast, Promiseland was a massive bull, weighing over 900 kilograms. Despite wearing a mandatory protective vest, the bull's stomping caused severe damage. As it turned out, Keeley also broke some ribs, suffered a punctured lung, and lacerated his liver. Up to that point, his vitals were fine. He then went into surgery, but bled to death on the operating table before the surgeons could repair his internal damage. He was ranked ninth in the PBR world standings at the time of his death, and the money he had won up to that point would have been enough to qualify him for the PBR World Finals. Promiseland was not considered a mean bull, and the incident was accepted as a "freak accident".

The next day, during Round 2, all the PBR riders, stock contractors, and staff wore yellow ribbons in honor of Keeley. In the Championship Round, Owen Washburn, the 1996 PBR World Champion, drew Promiseland, the same bull that caused Keeley's fatal injuries. Washburn rode him for 95.5 points and won the event.

Six days after his death almost 1,500 people paid their respects to Keeley at his memorial service. He was survived by his parents, sister and five brothers who were all bull riders at one time or another.

Keeley's remains were cremated and his ashes were spread on a hillside overlooking his family ranch in Stavely, Alberta.

Four months after Keeley's death, fellow Canadian bull rider Chris Self died after sustaining serious injuries at the Medicine Hat, Alberta, rodeo.

Promiseland's career continued until his last event at the Tuff Hedeman Championship Challenge in March 2003. He lived the rest of his life in retirement.

== Honours ==
After Keeley's death PBR bull riders wore a memorial sticker on their protective vests for the remainder of the 2000 season. It included Keeley's name and contestant back number, 68, which was ultimately retired from PBR competition following the 2000 season.

Keeley was given a tribute at the 2000 PBR World Finals in Las Vegas, Nevada. At the event, the Glen Keeley Award was introduced. From 2000 through 2012, it was presented to the Canadian bull rider who won the most money during the season on the PBR circuit. Since 2013, it has been presented to the Canadian bull rider who won the most points in the PBR world championship race.

Since 2004 the Glen Keeley Memorial Bull Riding, sanctioned by the PBR, has been held every summer in honour of Keeley. All the proceeds from the non-profit event are donated to the Glen Keeley Benevolent & Scholarship Fund.

In 2017 Keeley was posthumously inducted into the Canadian Pro Rodeo Hall of Fame.

== List of Glen Keeley Memorial Bull Riding champions ==
- 2004 (Canada) Tanner Girletz
- 2005 (Canada) Tanner Girletz
- 2006 (Canada) Scott Schiffner
- 2007 (Canada) Chad Besplug
- 2008 (Canada) Tyler Thomson
- 2009 (United States) Beau Hill
- 2010 (Canada) Chad Besplug
- 2011 (Canada) Tanner Girletz
- 2012 (Australia) Josh Birks
- 2013 (Canada) Tanner Byrne
- 2014 (Australia) Josh Birks
- 2015 (Canada) Jesse Torkelson
- 2016 (Canada) Devon Mezei
- 2017 (Canada) Zane Lambert (tie)
- 2017 (Canada) Jared Parsonage (tie)
- 2018 (Canada) Zane Lambert
- 2019 (Canada) Aaron Roy
- 2020 (Canada) Dakota Buttar
- 2021 (Canada) Nick Tetz
- 2022 (Canada) Wyatt Gleeson
- 2023 (Canada) Ashton Sahli
- 2024 (Canada) Jordan Hansen (tie)
- 2024 (Canada) Coy Robbins (tie)
- 2025 (Canada) Jared Parsonage
