= Medicine Woman (horse) =

American saddlebronc horse (2003-2021)

- Discipline: Saddleback bronc
- Sex: Mare
- Foaled: 2003
- Died: December 9, 2021
- Country: United States
- Breeder: Frontier Rodeo
- Owner: Jerry Nelson

Honors
- 2022 ProRodeo Hall of Fame

Medicine Woman #302 (2003-2021) was an American rodeo bucking horse that was specialized in saddle bronc riding. She competed in the Professional Rodeo Cowboys Association (PRCA) and was a four-time PRCA Saddle Bronc Horse of the Year. She won the award in 2011, 2014, 2015, and 2016. She also was the Saddle Bronc Horse of the National Finals Rodeo (NFR) in 2010 and 2015. In 2022, she was posthumously inducted into the ProRodeo Hall of Fame.

== Background ==
Medicine Woman was born in 2003 and raised on a ranch at Freedom, Oklahoma. She was sired by Big Medicine and out of Showtime. She was owned by Jerry Nelson of Frontier Rodeo.

== Career ==
Medicine Woman qualified for the NFR 12 times. She made her first trip to the NFR in 2009 in bareback riding. In 2010, they switched her to saddle bronc riding; she remained there for the rest of her bucking career. Medicine Woman helped many cowboys earn 90+ point rides. She assisted Wade Sundell in becoming a $1 million winner at the American Rodeo in Arlington, Texas, with a 90.75 ride.

She and many cowboys made over 90 qualified rides that helped the cowboys win at rodeos all over the United States. If you could manage an 8-second ride on her, you usually got a check. She helped Wade Sundell win his world championship in 2018. He rode her for a score of 92 points. At the NFR that year, Sundell drew her again. She helped him get the first round-win of his gold buckle season in the 10th round.

CoBurn Bradshaw drew her, and she took him to a 92-point ride. Few horses have helped riders win two rounds where those rides assisted them to win the average and the gold buckle. In 2019, Sundell rode her again at the San Antonio Stock Show for a 92-point ride. In the summer, she bucked him off at the Dodge City Roundup in Dodge City, Kansas. In 2020, Medicine Woman headed to the NFR at Globe Life Field in Arlington, Texas, where she was officially retired. The event was held there instead of its usual home at the Thomas & Mack Center in Las Vegas because of the COVID-19 pandemic and Nevada state restrictions on large events.

“She's just a big old gentle bronc that just hangs out in the back end and when the gate opens she does give it 100 percent every time,” said Audy Reed. Reed rode Medicine Woman for 87.5 points on March 17 at the Southeastern Livestock Exposition in Montgomery, Alabama. Two other rides of Frontier mounts also posted the same number of points. "She's there to win. So if you've got her drawn you better be there to win, too." "If they ride her they usually win first place on her,” Stewart said."... The majority of the time when they do ride her there's a bunch of points and they win first on her." Rusty Wright rode Medicine Woman for 91 points at last year's saddle-bronc event at the American Bank Center, and he won it.

"If they're what we call the superstars, we'll buck them one time a weekend. If we’re at a rodeo where it's a whole week long, we might buck her on a Monday and then buck her on a Saturday or something," The owner's right-hand, Stewart said. "We always give them some rest. We don't never buck them back to back." Rest is in the cards for Medicine Woman. She's 14 years old; so her competition days are dwindling. "Oh, we'll probably buck her another two or three (years) and then let her raise colts," Stewart said. "We won't just haul her until she quits bucking. Here in probably two or three years we'll let her stay home." Gay disagreed, proffering that the horse could have up to six more years competing and possibly more horse of the year honors.

One thing is for sure; she has advanced on the list of favorites Gay keeps. "Full Baggage was my favorite but I think Medicine Woman is now, maybe it's just because she's a mare," he said. "She's just prettier. There's just something about her. The word majestic comes to my mind and I’ve been around bucking horses my whole life and I’ve seen some of the great ones," Gay said. "But she's just a gorgeous animal, I'm telling you. She can be eating or getting a drink from the lake and you can get a profile. It's just incredible."

== Awards ==
- 2010, 2015 Saddle Bronc Horse of the NFR
- 2010 PRCA Reserve Saddle Bronc Horse of the Year
- 2011 4th Reserve Saddle Bronc Horse of the NFR
- 2011, 2014, 2015, 2016 PRCA Saddle Bronc Horse of the Year
- 2013 PRCA 3rd Reserve Saddle Bronc Horse of the NFR
- 2014 PRCA Reserve Saddle Bronc Horse of the NFR
- 2017 PRCA 3rd Place Saddle Bronc Horse of the Year
- 2019 PRCA Reserve Saddle Bronc Horse of the Year
- 2020 PRCA Reserve Saddle Bronc Horse of the Year
- 2022 ProRodeo Hall of Fame

== Death and legacy ==
Medicine Woman was a gentle horse while with her herd; she even got used to having her picture taken. You could get close to her, but she did not allow petting.

She headed to her last NFR in 2020 in Arlington, Texas. She had her first colt on May 9, 2021. Medicine Woman went to 12 consecutive NFRs. She is an inductee of the Class of 2022 at the ProRodeo Hall of Fame. She won the Bareback Horse of the Year award 4 times; only saddle bronc horse Sippin' Velvet (5) and Descent (6) won the award more times than her. She died on December 9, 2021, in Freedom, Oklahoma. She was 19 years old. They buried her on the Frontier Rodeo ranch with a headstone.
