= RFD-TV (Canadian TV channel) =

Rural lifestyle/country music channel

RFD-TV Canada
- RFD-TV Canada logo
- Country: Canada
- Broadcast area: National
- Headquarters: Edmonton, Alberta

Programming
- Picture format: 1080i (HDTV)

Ownership
- Owner: Wild TV Inc.
- Sister channels: The Cowboy Channel Canada; Water Television Network; Wild TV

History
- Launched: February 1, 2020, 6 years ago

Links
- Website: rfdtvcanada.ca

RFD-TV Canada is a Canadian English language licence-exempted Category B specialty channel broadcasting programming focused on the agribusiness, equine and the rural lifestyles, along with traditional country music and entertainment. The channel is owned by Ryan Kohler through Wild TV Inc.

== History ==
The channel launched on February 1, 2020 on Shaw Direct television systems in high definition through a partnership with Rural Media Group, licensing the brand and majority of its content from its U.S. counterpart, RFD-TV.
