= Water Television Network =

- Water Television Network logo
- Country: Canada
- Broadcast area: National
- Headquarters: Edmonton, Alberta

Programming
- Picture format: 1080i (HDTV)

Ownership
- Owner: Wild TV Inc.
- Sister channels: RFD-TV Canada; The Cowboy Channel Canada; Wild TV

History
- Launched: July 16, 2020, 6 years ago

Links
- Website: www.thewaterchannel.ca

Water Television Network is a Canadian English language licence-exempted Category B specialty channel broadcasting programming targeting water sport enthusiasts, including programming on sail boating adventures, scuba diving, fresh and saltwater angling, kayaking, camping, and more. The channel is owned by Ryan Kohler through Wild TV Inc.

== History ==
The channel launched on July 16, 2020 on Shaw Direct in high-definition.
