= Ellensburg Rodeo Hall of Fame =

Hall of Fame for Cowboys

Ellenburg Rodeo Hall of Fame
- Established: 1997
- Location: 110 W 6th Street, PMB 374, Ellensburg, WA 98926
- Type: Hall of fame
- Website: ERHF

The Ellensburg Rodeo Hall of Fame is a cowboy hall of fame. The hall of fame for the Ellensburg Rodeo was established in 1997. The hall of fame writes a biography for each inductee in a permanent file. It also collects and stores inductee rodeo mementos and artifacts, among many other important functions. Inductees are categorized as follows: (1) National Contestant; (2) Local Contestant; (3) Participant (clown, judge, announcer, trick rider, stock contractor etc.); (4) Volunteer Organizer; (5) Livestock; and (6) Pioneer Rodeo Family.

== Hall of Fame Inductees ==
1997

- "Ought"
- Maude Barnett
- Bosque Boy
- Leonard Davis
- Tom Ferguson
- Bill McMacken
- Montie Montana
- Dean Oliver
- H.E. "Doc" Pfenning
- Jim Shoulders
- Frank Wood
- Wranglerettes
- Larry Wyatt
- Yakama Indian Nation

1998

- Cooke Family
- Ellensburg Rodeo Posse
- Ferguson Family
- Gage Family
- Charmayne James
- J. C. Kaynor
- Smokey Kayser
- Pete Knight
- McEwen Family
- Morrison Family
- George Prescott
- Scamper
- Thomas Family

1999

- Bernice Blair Dossey Bolen
- Christensen Brothers Rodeo Company
- Deb Copenhaver
- Driver Family
- Gene Miles

2000

- Harry Anderson
- Necklace
- Wick Peth
- Schnebly Family
- Kenny Stanton
- Harry Vold

2001

- Buff Brady, Jr.
- Bill Linderman
- John P. Foster
- Larry Mahan
- Casey Tibbs
- Kittitas County Roping Club
- Warpaint

2002

- Badger Mountain
- Bernard and Moomaw
- Harry Charters
- Fitterer Family
- Harry Knight
- Mickey

2003

- Anderson Family
- Schaller Bennett
- Frank Bryant
- Clint Corey
- Phil Gardenhire
- Lou Richards
- Lee Scott

2004

- Joe Beaver
- Everett Bowman
- Joe Kelsey Rodeo Company
- Loyd Ketchum
- Kenny McLean
- Red One
- Bob Swaim
- Widow Maker

2005

- Joe Alexander
- Jimmie Cooper
- King County Posse
- McManamy Family
- Rose and Red Wall
- Tornado

2006

- Beard Rodeo Company
- Spirit of the Trail Night Pageant
- Homegrown
- John Ludkta
- Rod Lyman
- Marty Wood

2007

- Allen Bach
- Katherine Bach with Foxy Coke
- DeVere Helfrich
- John and Gwen Jordan (Honorees)
- Minor Family

2008

- Stuart Anderson
- Guy Allen
- Dick Griffith

2009

- Big Bend/Flying 5 Rodeo Company
- Butch Lehmkuhler
- Charlie Sampson
- Spring Fling

2010

- Dan and Judy Ackley
- Eddie Akridge
- Nason Aronica Family

2011

- Ellensburg Rodeo Royalty
- Allen Faltus
- Fred Palmiero

2012

- Trevor Brazile
- Dr. Ken MacRae

2013

- Calgary Stampede Ranch
- Grated Coconut
- Gary Remple
- Buz Peth

2014

- Bill McKay
- Bud Munroe
- Scott Repp

2015

- Vern Castro
- Nell Henderson
- John W. Jones Jr.
- Jan Smith

2016

- Miles Hare
- Rodeo Grandmas

2017

- John Payne – 'The One Arm Bandit'
- The Smith Family

2018

- Jake Barnes
- Katherine 'Kay' Hageman
- Clay O’Brien Cooper
- Frank Wallace Family

2019

- The Burkheimer Family
- Flint Rasmussen

2020

- Slim Pickens
- Mabel Strickland

2021

- Dynamite
- Frederic Gregg "Fritz" Truan

2022

- Spring Planting
- Dick and J.D. Yates
- Kittitas County Junior Sheriff's Posse

2023

- Justin McKee
- Dan Mortensen
- Cody Ohl
- Rich Skelton
- Rob Smets

2024

- Dave Brock
- Jack & Beneitta Eaton Family
- Charles Pogue

2025

- Mike Beers
- Palmer-Smith Cattle Company
- Tex Taliaferro

2026

- Sage Kimzey
- Steven Peebles
- Orcutt Family
