= Richie Champion =

American bareback rider

Richmond "Richie" Champion (born December 16, 1992) is an American former professional rodeo cowboy who specialized in bareback bronc riding and became the first bareback rider to earn $1 million at a single rodeo.

== Early life ==
Richie Champion was born on December 16, 1992, in Orange County, California. He is the son of Greg, a hotel company executive, and Lori, a consultant who competed in show jumping while she was in college. The family moved between Texas, Arizona, Washington State, and Alaska when Champion was a child. When he was 10, Champion began taking lessons in Western riding. He showed much talent as a rider, prompting mounted shooting world champion Annie Bianco to invite him to train with her. Champion competed in mounted shooting before asking to train in roping. In junior high, Champion began bull riding.

The Champion family moved to The Woodlands, Texas, during his junior year in high school. The following summer, a coach asked Champion if he had ever considered bareback riding, a sport similar to bull riding, except the bucking animals were horses. In his first competition as a bareback rider, Champion was bucked from the horse. He had fallen in love with the sport, however, and continued to compete. At the end of his senior year in 2011, Champion won the Texas High School Rodeo Association bareback title. He earned a rodeo scholarship to Tarleton State University in Stephenville, Texas. He attended Tarleton for three years.

== Rodeo career ==
After graduating from high school, Champion joined the Professional Rodeo Cowboys Association (PRCA). He competed on the PRCA rodeo circuit, winning several small rodeos. In 2013, he traveled with world champion bareback rider Kaycee Feild, learning valuable tips on mental preparation.

Champion had more success in the 2014 rodeo season, placing at major rodeos including Fort Worth Stock Show & Rodeo, San Antonio Stock Show & Rodeo, and National Western Stock Show. In March 2014, at age 21, Champion competed in the inaugural The American Rodeo in Arlington, Texas. Organizers invited the top 10 ranked cowboys in each event and allowed others to earn a place in the finals by competing in qualifying events. Champion won the finals of the bareback riding competition by riding a horse named Assault to a score of 90. As the winner of the event, he received $100,000. As the only winner to have come through the qualifying rounds, he earned an additional $1 million. This was the largest rodeo prize ever awarded in a single day. Winning such a large prize at the young age of 21 gave him freedom. Champion reflected that as a rodeo cowboy, "you find yourself in a position trying to win money a lot of times and having to push yourself sore or hurt, trying to get on the next one to make money[. ...] To not do that and just to ride bucking horses and do what I love is amazing." This was before The American was sanctioned by the PRCA, meaning Champion could not use his earnings to qualify for the National Finals Rodeo (NFR), which selects competitors based on their prize winnings for the year. Champion competed at more than 100 other rodeos during the 2014 season, earning a combined $90,000 at sanctioned rodeos, which qualified him for competition at the NFR. At the finals, he won Round 5. He finished the rodeo season ranked 3rd in the world in bareback riding.

Champion finished the 2015 rodeo season ranked 23rd in the world and did not earn a spot in the NFR. He underwent back surgery in November 2015 and returned to competition two months later.

In 2016, Champion became a shareholder in the Elite Rodeo Athletes (ERA), a new for-profit rodeo organization. The ERA planned to host a circuit of eight rodeos, all televised, and each with the same roster of top talent. The PRCA promptly changed their bylaws. Cowboys with financial interest in any other rodeo association would be denied membership in the PRCA beginning with the 2016 season. ERA members like Champion would be disqualified from all PRCA rodeos, including the NFR. The ERA sued the PRCA, seeking a temporary injunction allowing the cowboys to compete at PRCA events. Federal district judge Barbara Lynn denied the preliminary injunction in February, during the multi-day Fort Worth Stock Show & Rodeo. Although Champion had been leading the bareback riding field, he was forced to withdraw from the competition and return prize money he had won in the initial rounds.

After the ERA went out of business after its only year of competition, Champion returned to compete in the PRCA.

In his PRCA career, Champion qualified for the NFR a total of nine times (2014, 2016-2021, and 2023-2024).

Champion also competed in the Canadian Professional Rodeo Association (CPRA) and won the CPRA bareback riding national championship at the Canadian Finals Rodeo (CFR) in 2018. He qualified for the CFR three times (2018-2019, and 2025).

Champion retired from bareback riding after competing in the 2026 Calgary Stampede.

== Personal life ==
In 2018, Champion married Canadian former professional pair skater, Paige Lawrence. They have two children and reside in Stevensville, Montana.
