= Cody Cassidy =

Canadian steer wrestler (born 1981)

- Born: June 26, 1981 (age 45); Bashaw, Alberta, Canada
- Occupations: Cowboy, steer wrestler, tie-down roper

Cody Cassidy (born June 26, 1981) is a Canadian professional rodeo cowboy who specializes in steer wrestling. He is a five-time Canadian Professional Rodeo Association (CPRA) champion steer wrestler.

Cassidy was born on June 26, 1981, in Bashaw, Alberta, Canada. In 2010, he qualified for the National Finals Rodeo, and also won the Houston Livestock Show and Rodeo. That year, Cody finished fifth in the Professional Rodeo Cowboys Association (PRCA) world standings, his highest ranking so far, with $155,567.

Cassidy's brother, Curt, is also a steer wrestler.
