= Dustin Flundra =

Canadian rodeo cowboy

Dustin Flundra (born 1980) is a Canadian professional rodeo cowboy who specializes in saddle bronc riding.

He won the 2014 Calgary Stampede. That year, along with in 2009 and 2010, he qualified for the National Finals Rodeo. He is a multiple-time champion at the Canadian Finals Rodeo. He qualified for the event more than a dozen times.
