= Wild TV =

Canadian television specialty channel

- Wild TV logo
- Country: Canada
- Broadcast area: National
- Headquarters: Edmonton, Alberta

Programming
- Picture format: 480i (SDTV); 1080i (HDTV)

Ownership
- Owner: Wild TV Inc.
- Sister channels: RFD-TV Canada; The Cowboy Channel Canada; Water Television Network

History
- Launched: September 2004
- Former names: Wild TV (2004-2019); Wild Pursuit Network (2019); Wild TV (2019 - present)

Links
- Website: wildtv.ca

Wild TV is a Canadian English language Category B specialty channel broadcasting programming focusing on hunting, fishing, shooting, and the outdoors. The channel is owned by Dieter Kohler through Wild TV Inc.

== Distribution ==
In May 2003, Dieter Kohler was granted approval from the Canadian Radio-television and Telecommunications Commission (CRTC) to launch a television specialty channel called The Hunting Channel, which was described as service that "would be devoted to all aspects of hunting and fishing. It would include programming that educates the viewer on the conservation and future of wildlife, food preparation, and safety issues relating to the use of firearms and bow and arrow hunting."

The channel launched in September 2004. While initially being available only through a few smaller television service providers such as Access Cable and Westman Communications, it has since become widely available across Canada on all major television service providers including Cogeco, Rogers Cable, Shaw Cable, Shaw Direct, Videotron, Bell Satellite TV, and Eastlink.

In March 2019, Wild TV was renamed Wild Pursuit Network when it entered into a partnership with Pursuit Channel in the United States. The partnership ended in the late summer of 2019 and the channel's name was changed back to Wild TV.

== International broadcast ==
=== New Zealand ===
Wild TV reached its first international distribution agreement with TelstraClear in New Zealand. It first aired on July 1, 2009 on TelstraClear's InHomeTV service (Channel 39).

=== Europe ===
In 2010 and 2011, Wild TV was launched in several European markets including Finland, Estonia, Sweden, Slovakia, Czech Republic, and Slovenia.

== Wild TV HD ==
On January 28, 2010, Wild TV HD was launched as a high definition simulcast of Wild TV's standard definition feed. It is available on Rogers Cable, MTS, Optik TV and SaskTel. On December 4, 2013, Videotron added Wild TV HD.
