= Descent (horse) =

Saddleback horse

- Discipline: Saddle bronc
- Sex: Gelding
- Country: United States
- Color: Palomino
- Breeder: Art Douglas
- Owner: Cervi; Beutler; Bud Kramer; Eddie Vaugn; Art Douglas

Honors
- 1979 ProRodeo Hall of Fame

Descent was a bucking horse who was specialized in saddle bronc riding and competed in the Rodeo Cowboys Association. He is a six-time Bucking Horse of the Year awardee. He won the award in 1966, 1967, 1968, 1969, 1971, and 1972. He is also a 1979 ProRodeo Hall of Fame inaugural inductee.

== Background ==
Descent was a Palomino gelding. He was raised on Art Douglas's Ranch in Browning, Montana. On his sire side, his pedigree is traced to Thoroughbreds such as Cavalry remount horses. On his dan's side, his pedigree is Morgan breeding. Douglas sold Descent along with some wild horses to Eddie Vaugn. Vaughn sold the horses to Bud Kramer. Beutler Brothers Rodeo supplied the stock for the State Fair and Rodeo at Great Falls, Montana. Kramer took the horses for a try-out. Leonard Nelson got on the young Descent, and he bucked quite strongly. Descent bucked Leonard high enough that announcer Pete Logan looked up and saw a plane in descent, so Sonny Linger and Pete christened him Descent. In 1964, Lynn Beutler bought Descent when he was five years old. Mike Cervi purchased what is now known as Cervi Rodeo but formerly Beuller Brothers in 1967. For a time they were known as Beutler Brothers Cervi. In modern times, Cervi Rodeo is one of the largest rodeo companies in the business. Descent was one of their top horses in the 1960s.

== Career ==
When the Beutler Brothers bought Descent, that's when he started bucking in rodoeos. He bucked off every cowboy until 1965. Bobby Berger was the first cowboy to ride Descent. Berger, from Kansas, drew Descent at the Black Hills Roundup, in Belle Fourche, South Dakota. Descent went on to buck off many more champions. Names like Larry Mahan, Guy Weeks, Alvin Nelson, Ross Loney, Shawn Davis, and Bill Smith. He won the Saddle Bronc of the Year six times, two times more than fellow ProRodeo Hall of Fame horse, Medicine Woman.

=== Awards ===
1966 Saddle Bronc of the Year

1967 Saddle Bronc of the Year

1968 Saddle Bronc of the Year

1969 Saddle Bronc of the Year

1971 Saddle Bronc of the Year

1972 Saddle Bronc of the Year

== Retirement and death ==
Descent was retired to the National Western Stock Show and Rodeo in Denver, Colorado, in 1975. Then he lived in contentment at the ProRodeo Hall of Fame until he died in 1983, at Larry Mahan's Ranch. Three-time world champion Bill Smith of Thermopolis, Wyoming, who owned Descent for a time, paid a tribute to him. He had nine opportunities to ride Descent. Descent bucked him off five times. Smith got a qualified ride from him four times. "He's the greatest horse who ever lived-bar none", Bill says, "right up there with Secretariat". Smith has a Quarter Horse Ranch which sells trained geldings.

== Legacy ==
"The rankest Descent ever bucked with me, I rode him, and I don't know how I did", Bill says. "But it was, by far, the best bronc ride I ever made on the best horse I ever rode. He nearly bucked me off every jump, and I can remember every jump. I'd give my life to be able to do it one more time-even if he threw me the first jump. Descent was one of the horses that really makes life worthwhile."

"When they retired Descent at Denver (National Western Stock Show and Rodeo)", Bill continues, "I stood there with tears running down my face. When he walked into the arena, I just couldn't hold them back".

In 1979, the two met again as retirees. It was at the ProRodeo Hall of Fame in Colorado Springs, Colorado. The horse was on exhibit to the public. Descent was known for rebuffing adult visitors, but if there was a child, he might come near the fence.When personnel had revealed that to Bill and his wife Carole, Bill commented, to their amusement, that even though Descent had bucked him off numerous times, the old horse would still come near him."

"It would seem a lie if Carole hadn't taken that picture", Bill says. "That old horse walked right over and stood there while I scratched him, just like I would one of my riding horses. He was not gentle, and he didn't just come up to me-he stayed there. That would be just another big, windy story without that picture".

"It was,” Carole says, “a really neat, neat moment". "Some might have thought it was two champs meeting on their own turf, but not Bill." "That was two souls meeting-never mind the champs. He was the winner".

Larry Mahan was known for treating Descent as if he owned the horse. He hooked the horse R.C.A. style until the signal horn. He then fanned with his hat and stepped down from him, the old-time cowboy way.

Recently, Ivan Daines, who is a Red Deer, Alberta, cowboy sings tribute to the horse who bucked him off, Descent. Ivan Daines wrote and sang a new song for Descent. When Daines was a world champion saddle bronc rider, in the 1970s, he was competing across America. "He bucked me off once — but then he threw everyone". said Daines, who claims he shared a touching moment with the horse not long after he was retired. Daines claimed Descent looked at him as if he knew it was the last time they would meet.
