= Isabella Miller (barrel racer) =

Canadian barrel racer

- Miller in 1969
- Born: Pearl Isabella Hamilton; 28 January 1941; Alberta, Canada
- Died: 26 January 2007 (aged 65); Maricopa, Arizona, United States
- Other names: Isabella Hamilton Miller, Isabella Miller Haraga
- Occupation(s): Rodeo contestant, rancher, horse trainer
- Years active: 1957–2007
- Spouse: Arnold Haraga (m. 2002)
- Children: 3

Isabella Miller (28 January 1941 – 26 January 2007) was a Canadian rodeo cowgirl, rancher and horse trainer. She was the Canadian barrel racing champion in 1960 and 1969 and was a five-time winner of the Canadian all-around women's title. She was inducted into the Canadian Pro Rodeo Hall of Fame in 2005.

== Early life ==
Pearl Isabella Hamilton was born on 28 January 1941 in Alberta, Canada to Ruth (née Johnson) and William James Hamilton. She grew up in DeWinton, Alberta, where her parents operated a ranch. Her father had been a bull riding champion in the 1920s and was a chuckwagon driver. Her grandparents manufactured Red River carts in Calgary. Hamilton began learning to ride when she was two years old.

Hamilton was one of the founders of the Canadian Girls' Barrel Racing Association, which formed in 1957 and was elected as the organization's president for 1959. The goal of the association was to promote women's participation in rodeo and to be allowed to compete in the Calgary Stampede and other regular rodeo events. From 1958, they won the right to participate in the Stampede.

== Competitive career ==
In 1960, Hamilton won the Canadian barrel racing championship, having owned, trained, and ridden her own horse. Around 1962, she married and began competing as Isabella Miller. She won the women's All-Around title five times — in 1963, 1966, 1967, 1968, and 1969. In 1963, she was also named as Calgary's Athlete of the Year by the Calgary Sports Women's Association. Despite a vehicle accident in which her horse died during the 1969 season, Miller repeated that year as Canadian barrel racing champion.

Miller raised three children, Tyler, Bobbie June, and Billie Ruth Miller, as a single mother and to make ends meet, drove a school bus for 15 years. As she made little money from barrel racing, she also raised horses, trained them, and worked as a stunt rider in films. She continued to compete in barrel racing events into her 60s and was often ranked among Canada's top ten women in the sport. In the early 1980s, she became president of the barrel racing association for a second term, serving from 1981 to 1986. In 2002, she married Arnold Haraga, a former Canadian all-around champion and steer wrestler and sculptor. After their marriage, the couple wintered at their ranch in Arizona. She was inducted into the Canadian Pro Rodeo Hall of Fame in 2005.

== Death and legacy ==
On 24 January 2007, Haraga was injured in a fall from her horse on her ranch in Maricopa, Arizona. The fall caused an aneurysm and Haraga died two days later on 26 January 2007. Her children and grandchildren have continued the tradition of competing in rodeo events.
