= Viola Thomas =

Canadian barrel racer

- Born: 1939 (age 85–86); Alberta, Canada
- Occupation(s): Horse rider and trainer

Viola Thomas (born 1939) is a three-time Canadian barrel racing champion and one of the first women to be licensed as a jockey in Canada. She was the first licensed woman jockey to ride in both Alberta and Saskatchewan, third woman to ride as a licensed jockey in Canada, and 17th woman jockey in North America. She was inducted into the Canadian Pro Rodeo Hall of Fame in 2014.

== Early life ==
Viola Thomas was born in 1939 in Alberta, Canada. She grew up in Millarville, near Calgary, on her parents' ranch. Her father was a farrier and staff sergeant with Lord Strathcona's Horse Regiment. By the time she was four years old, Thomas was riding horses and from age ten was competing with male riders on the class B race circuit. As a teenager, she competed in trail rides as well as steer decorating, an event which requires the rider to dismount and adorn a steer horn with a ribbon.

== Career ==
Thomas continued to compete as an adult appearing in rodeo events in Canada, Arizona, California, and Texas. In 1958, she won the Canadian barrel racing championship and repeated the feat in 1959 and 1961. In 1962, she suffered a broken collarbone and some ribs during an event in Millarville and as she could not ride, turned to breaking and training horses. She also worked as an "exercise boy" conditioning horses to prepare them for other riders and worked for a California sheriff's department breaking stallions.

From 1964, Thomas began speaking out about the legal disparity for male and female riders. In 1968, she challenged a rule that did not admit women to the class A race circuit, requiring them to remain on the B circuit or compete in the bush leagues. That year, she also began taking veterinary courses at Loma Linda College in Riverside, California and also competed for Canada in the first International Powder Puff Derby, at South Park Oval near Pittsburgh, Pennsylvania, bringing home the silver medal.

When licensed in 1969, she became the first woman in Canada licensed as a jockey in Alberta and Saskatchewan and the second to be licensed in British Columbia, after Mary Cowan. In North America, she was the 17th woman allowed to be licensed and in Canada was the third woman to receive a jockey's license. After obtaining her license, she often had to convince owners, trainers, or other riders to allow her to race.

Returning to training horses in the late 1970s, Thomas worked as a full-time trainer for a rancher in Millarville, winning several events through the early 1980s. She continued training until 1987, when she received a skull fracture in a training accident. Thomas was inducted into the Canadian Pro Rodeo Hall of Fame in 2014.
