= Canadian Professional Rodeo Association =

Governing body of professional rodeo in Canada

- Sport: Rodeo
- Founded: 1944
- Country: Canada
- Most recent champions: (Canada) Logan Spady, All-Around Cowboy (Canada) Bradi Whiteside, All-Around Cowgirl
- Website: rodeocanada.com

The Canadian Professional Rodeo Association (CPRA) is the governing body of professional rodeo in Canada. Its championship event is the Canadian Finals Rodeo (CFR) held every autumn.

== History ==
The Canadian Professional Rodeo Organization was founded in 1944. It started when some cowboys joined up to create the Cowboys Insurance Association when each cowboy added $1 to create an insurance fund. Rodeo management matched that amount to increase the insurance fund. A year later in 1945, they renamed the organization the Cowboys Protective Association (CPA). Under the Societies Act, they completed the necessary actions to become an association. This enabled the organization to serve its members in a more general way. They enlisted their first president, Ken Thomson of Black Diamond. They had 160 members in the beginning. Money for fees was high and returns on wins was not. In 1965, the society incorporated under the name, Canadian Rodeo Cowboys Association, which continued until 1980. At that time, the organization finally became known under its current name, Canadian Professional Rodeo Association (CPRA). Now the organization has over 1,000 members.

Women competed in the inaugural events of the Calgary Stampede in 1912 and participated in various rodeos until 1919. But from 1923, they were barred from official rodeo competitions in Canada until 1958. Hoping to gain approval for barrel racing to be added to the events of the Stampede and other official rodeo events, women formed the Canadian Girls' Barrel Racing Association in 1957. Two of its founding members, Isabella Hamilton (later Miller) and Viola Thomas met with the Cowboys Protective Association and were successful in convincing the board to allow women to compete from 1958, but because of biases by management were given race times with the children and received low pay. Frances Church, 1972 Canadian barrel racing champion, noted that in the United States men and women had equal purses for like events, but Stampede manager Winston Bruce's response was that barrel racing was neither a rodeo event nor one that crowds wanted to see. Women were barred from membership in the Canadian Rodeo Cowboys Association until 1975, though the organization allowed women to purchase permits to participate in events. When the Stampede went to team competition in 1979, individual barrel racing was not sanctioned and did not occur again until 1982. In 1988, women were voted out of membership in the Canadian Professional Rodeo Association and the following year, barrel racing was again suspended at the Stampede. Though the event was brought back in 1990, it would take until 1995 for women to earn back the right to vote as members of the CPRA, have barrel racing recognized as a "major event", and be eligible for equal pay on the Canadian professional rodeo circuit.

As of 2013, the High River Agricultural Society was no longer affiliated with the CPRA. This means that the annual Guy Weadick Days Rodeo in June was now with the CPRA through the Foothills Cowboy Association instead.

On July 17, 2016, the CPRA fired their general manager, Dan Eddy. He had been the general manager since February 2015. There had been some issues raised, but the business advisory council's recommendation was to retain him. However, the directors decided to terminate him. Afterwards, the advisory members resigned. Then some of the directors stepped down to protest Eddy's termination. On October 19, 2016, the CPRA and Edmonton Northlands announced a partnership. The effect was that the CFR would continue to take place at the Northlands Coliseum, its historic home of 43 years.

On January 16, 2018, it was announced that the Canadian Finals Rodeo would move to Red Deer, Alberta, beginning in 2018, under a 10-year contract. The event would be held at Westerner Park and ENMAX Centrium, and be extended to a six-day event with a new youth competition, and additional entertainment. Temporary seating would be installed to expand the arena by 2,000 during the rodeo. Shortly thereafter that same year, the CPRA named a new president to the association. On February 28, 2018, Terry Cooke became the new president, and he took on his new duties forthwith. Also, per the CPRA, he was elected by acclamation.

On May 16, 2018, the CPRA announced a new partnership with the Finning Canada. Finning Canada became the title sponsor of the regular season CPRA tour, so it was now known as the Finning Canada Pro Rodeo Tour. Finning happens to be the largest dealer for Caterpillar Inc. On June 12, 2018, the CPRA announced an ongoing yearly partnership with FloSports. This agreement stated that in the future all the events and finals of the Finning Canada Pro Rodeo Tour, the Grass Roots Final, and the CFR will be aired exclusively on FloRodeo.com.

In 2020, only two CPRA events took place in the entire calendar year. They were both Xtreme Bulls events in the winter. Before the season was to be set into full swing in the spring, the regional COVID-19 epidemic became a global pandemic in March. As a result, all events were postponed. After several months, it was ultimately decided that the 2020 CPRA season was to be cancelled, along with the CFR.

CPRA events, including the CFR returned in 2021.

On April 22, 2023, it was announced that CPRA events, including the CFR, would now be televised live on The Cowboy Channel and The Cowboy Channel Canada, as well as being streamed on the subscription-based The Cowboy Channel Plus application. Additional CPRA events would also be televised on The Cowgirl Channel. This was the result of a five-year agreement with Rural Media Group to last through December 31, 2027.

On October 25, 2023, it was announced that the CFR would be returning to Edmonton in 2024, only now it will be held at Rogers Place. It will be held there through 2026.

== Organization ==
The Canadian Professional Rodeo Association (CPRA) and is headquartered in Airdrie, Alberta. It sanctions professional rodeo in western Canada. The organization's primary concerns are legitimacy of the rodeo competition and welfare of the livestock. The CPRA also works with the American sanctioning organization, Professional Rodeo Cowboys Association (PRCA). Obviously, rodeo participants are the highest in the forefront of any organization, but the CPRA also consists of all of the other usual rodeo personnel, such as stock contractors, judges, announcers, bull fighters, and others. Previously, the Canadian Finals Rodeo (CFR) was held at the Northlands Coliseum in Edmonton, Alberta. In 2018, the 45th annual CFR was held at the ENMAX Centrium, Westerner Park, in Red Deer, Alberta. The ability to secure this arena demonstrated that the rodeo still had a strong fan base and high growth rate. The CFR had to move when it was announced that the city of Edmonton was going to close the Northlands Coliseum down. Previously, the CFR was held at the Northlands Coliseum in Edmonton, Alberta, for its entire 44-year history. After announcing a new venue for the year 2018, the CFR took place in Red Deer, Alberta, on October 30 through November 4.

The CFR is the ultimate event of the organization. Throughout Canada, it is considered the top national championship of professional rodeo. The CFR's top award amount is one of the largest in Canadian rodeo, totaling $1.65 million. The top 12 competitors from the sanctioned events are selected for the CFR each year. The CFR ran for six days each season. From 2018 through 2022, FloRodeo, owned by FloSports, had live-streamed CPRA events. "We're excited about broadening our reach through our new partnership with FloSports," said Canadian Professional Rodeo Association General Manager Jeff Robson. "The opportunity to live stream the Finning Canada Pro Tour rodeos and both our finals – the Grass Roots Final and the Canadian Finals Rodeo – will provide welcome exposure for our sport and expand access for our fans." Annually, the rodeo features one of the nation's largest prize purses—$1.65 million—and accepts the top 12 money-earners from the CPRA rodeo season. Over six days, FloRodeo captured some of rodeo's top athletes competing through six rounds to determine each of the seven event winners, a high-point, and an all-around champion.

In 2017 and 2018, it was announced that the CPRA champions would receive an exemption to The American Rodeo Semi-Finals.

In 2023, The Cowboy Channel Canada signed a multi-year agreement with the CPRA to telecast and stream their major events, including the CFR, through 2027. That same year, it was announced that the CFR would be returning to Edmonton by 2024, with the CFR held at Rogers Place. It will be held there through 2026. The traditional six performances were shrunk to five performances, and the CFR is now held in early October, a full month earlier than ever in its history.

There are many rodeo associations sanctioning rodeos in a particular city or area in Canada that operate under the precepts of the CPRA. One such rodeo association is the British Columbia Rodeo Association.

== Events ==
- Bronc riding - there are two divisions in rodeo, bareback bronc riding, where the rider is only allowed to hang onto a bucking horse with a type of surcingle called a "rigging"; and saddle bronc riding, where the rider uses a specialized western saddle without a horn (for safety) and hangs onto a heavy lead rope, called a bronc rein, which is attached to a halter on the horse.
- Tie-down roping - also called calf roping, is based on ranch work in which calves are roped for branding, medical treatment, or other purposes. It is the oldest of rodeo's timed events. The cowboy ropes a running calf around the neck with a lariat, and his horse stops and sets back on the rope while the cowboy dismounts, runs to the calf, throws it to the ground and ties three feet together. (If the calf falls when roped, the cowboy must lose time waiting for the calf to get back to its feet so that the cowboy can do the work.) The job of the horse is to hold the calf steady on the rope. A well-trained calf-roping horse will slowly back up while the cowboy ties the calf, to help keep the lariat snug.
- Ladies barrel racing - is a timed speed and agility event. In barrel racing, horse and rider gallop around a cloverleaf pattern of barrels, making agile turns without knocking the barrels over. In professional, collegiate and high school rodeo, barrel racing is an exclusively women's sport, though men and boys occasionally compete at local O-Mok-See competition.
- Steer wrestling - Also known as "bulldogging," is a rodeo event where the rider jumps off his horse onto a Corriente steer and 'wrestles' it to the ground by grabbing it by the horns. This is probably the single most physically dangerous event in rodeo for the cowboy, who runs a high risk of jumping off a running horse head first and missing the steer, or of having the thrown steer land on top of him, sometimes horns first.
- Team roping - also called "heading and heeling," is the only rodeo event where men and women riders compete together. Two people capture and restrain a full-grown steer. One horse and rider, the "header," lassos a running steer's horns, while the other horse and rider, the "heeler," lassos the steer's two hind legs. Once the animal is captured, the riders face each other and lightly pull the steer between them, so that both ropes are taut. This technique originated from methods of capture and restraint for treatment used on a ranch.
- Bull riding - an event where the cowboys ride full-grown bulls instead of horses. Although skills and equipment similar to those needed for bareback bronc riding are required, the event differs considerably from horse riding competition due to the danger involved. Because bulls are unpredictable and may attack a fallen rider, rodeo clowns, now known as "bullfighters", work during bull-riding competition to distract the bulls and help prevent injury to competitors.
- Steer riding - a rough stock event for boys and girls where children ride steers, usually in a manner similar to bulls. Ages vary by region, as there is no national rule set for this event, but generally participants are at least eight years old and compete through about age 14. It is a training event for bronc riding and bull riding.
- All-around - The all-around is actually an award, not an event. It is awarded to the highest money winner in two or more events.

== Champions and awards ==
A full list of past champions from 1945 to 2023 is located here: List of Canadian Professional Rodeo Association Champions. There is also a List of Canadian Pro Rodeo Hall of Fame inductees.

== See also ==
- Lists of rodeo performers
- Bull Riding Hall of Fame
- Professional Bull Riders
- ProRodeo Hall of Fame
- Canadian Pro Rodeo Hall of Fame
- American Bucking Bull
- PRCA All-Around Champion
- Professional Rodeo Cowboys Association
- Women's Professional Rodeo Association
- International Professional Rodeo Association
- Federación Mexicana de Rodeo
- Australian Professional Rodeo Association
