= National Western Stock Show =

Annual livestock showing

Coordinates: 39°46′57″N 104°58′09″W

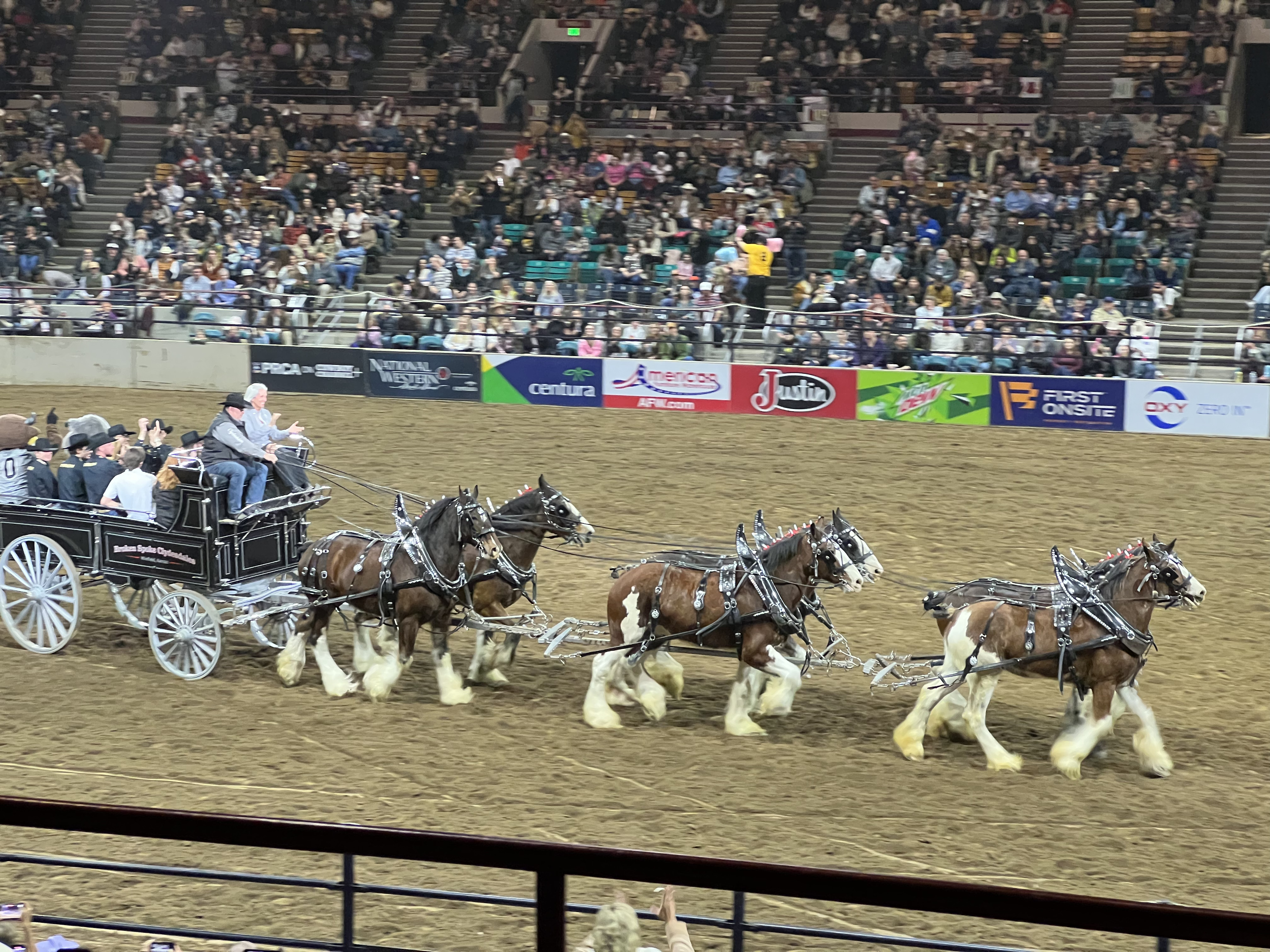
A horse drawn carriage at the 2023 National Western Stock Show

The National Western Stock Show is an annual livestock show and festival held every January, at the National Western Complex in Denver, Colorado, since 1906.

The show's original purpose was to demonstrate better breeding and feeding techniques to area stockmen; however, it was largely the main showings as a means to attract patrons to the surrounding vendors. The founders included Elias M. Ammons, president of the Colorado Cattle and Horse Growers Association and later governor of Colorado; George Ballentine, general manager of the Denver Union Stock Yard Company; and Fred P. Johnson, publisher of the Record Stockman. Since 1906, it has become the world's largest stock show by the number of animals and offers a carload and pen cattle show.

Originally limited to livestock from the western United States, the show was expanded in 1908 to include entrants from around the world. A horse show was added in 1908, and a rodeo was added in 1931. By 1925, an event for 4-H, the 4-H Roundup, was also held in conjunction with the stock show. By 1981, the organization owned numerous buildings, more than twenty acres of stockyards, several acres of parking, and assets totaling about five million dollars.

The stock show is governed by the Western Stock Show Association, a Colorado 501(c)(3) institution that produces the annual National Western Stock Show to further the association's mission: "To preserve the western lifestyle by providing a showcase for the agricultural industry through an emphasis on education, genetic development, innovative technology, and offering the world's largest agricultural marketing opportunities.".

Proceeds from the National Western Stock Show go to the National Western Scholarship Trust. The Trust awards 64 scholarships annually to students studying agriculture and medicine at colleges and universities in Colorado and Wyoming.

The horse shows at the annual National Western Stock Show are among the largest in the world, with more than 18,000 entries at the 2006 event. The horse show includes Quarter Horses, Paint Horses, Hunters & Jumpers, Open Horse Shows, Mules Shows, and the Draft Horse Show & Pull competition.

The National Western rodeo is considered one of the largest indoor rodeos and has won honors from the Professional Rodeo Cowboys Association (PRCA), including three Large Indoor Rodeo of the Year titles (1997, 2000, and 2001). Additionally, the ProRodeo Hall of Fame in Colorado Springs, Colorado, inducted the National Western Stock Show and Rodeo in 2008.

The Professional Bull Riders (PBR) have had an event as part of the rodeo since 1998.

The show was not held in 1915 due to a national outbreak of foot-and-mouth disease (now also known as hoof-and-mouth), which affects animals with cloven hoofs such as cattle and again in 2021 due to COVID-19 restrictions. It returned in 2022.
