= Canadian Finals Rodeo =

National championship professional rodeo in Canada

The Canadian Finals Rodeo (CFR) is the national championship professional rodeo in Canada, currently held in Edmonton, Alberta; the host site from its 1974 inception through 2017, after being held in Red Deer, Alberta, from 2018 through 2023. The CFR takes place in the fall and is the final event of the Canadian Professional Rodeo Association (CPRA) season. It offers one of the richest purses in Canadian rodeo, usually worth over C$1,000,000.

== Format ==
Currently, the CFR features the 10 leading money winners in each event throughout the Canadian rodeo season, as well as the first- and second-place finishers in each event during the last 10 rodeos of the Canadian Tour season. Each CFR event is contested over five days, featuring six rounds. Before 2006, only Canadian residents were able to compete in the CFR. However, international contestants are now eligible to compete, granted they qualify.

From its inception through 2007, the CFR had a unique sudden-death format in which none of the prize money the competitors had earned during the season carried over to the finals. Competitors who finished in the first four places in each round of the CFR received points on a sliding scale from 40 points to 10 points. At the end of the rodeo, the top four places in "the average" (i.e., average time or score throughout all the rounds) also earned points on the same scale. The performers with the most points in each event were crowned Canadian champions.

In 2008, at the request of the competitors, the CFR adopted a format similar to that of the National Finals Rodeo in the United States. The competitors now carry over their money earnings during the Canadian season, and the money they earn during the CFR is added to their season total, with the leading money-winner in each event at the end of the CFR crowned as season champion. The contestants argued that the amount of money on offer at the CFR made it impossible to clinch a season title before the CFR, and that adopting an NFR-style format would encourage more entries at smaller late-season rodeos.

== Host ==
From its 1974 inception through 2017, the event was held at Northlands and Northlands Coliseum (most recently known as Rexall Place) in Edmonton, Alberta. In July 2016, it was announced that the event would move to Saskatoon, Saskatchewan, in 2017, after having rejected a bid by Northlands and Oilers Entertainment Group to continue hosting the event in Edmonton.

However, on October 19, 2016, it was announced that the memorandum of understanding between the CPRA and the city of Saskatoon had fallen through and that a new deal had been reached between the CPRA and Northlands to keep the event in Edmonton for 2017. Northlands Coliseum was closed in 2018 due to financial difficulties affecting Northlands since the opening of Rogers Place.

On January 16, 2018, it was announced that the Canadian Finals Rodeo would move to Red Deer, Alberta, beginning 2018, under a 10-year contract. The event was moved to Westerner Park and Peavey Mart Centrium, and was extended to a six-day event with a new youth competition, and additional entertainment. Temporary seating is installed to expand the arena by 2,000 during the rodeo.

The CPRA did not have a season in 2020 because of the COVID-19 pandemic, but it returned to having events, including the CFR, in 2021.

On October 25, 2023, it was announced that the CFR would be returning to Edmonton by 2024, with the rodeo held at Rogers Place. It will be held there through 2026. The traditional six performances were shrunk to five performances, and the CFR is now held in early October, a full month earlier than ever in its history.

== Events ==
Championship titles are awarded to the individuals who earn the most money in their event:

- Bareback bronc riding
- Breakaway roping
- Steer wrestling - Also known as bull dogging
- Team roping - Divided into "Headers" and "Heelers" in 1995
  - Headers - Cowboys who rope the steer's head
  - Heelers - Cowboys who rope the steer's hind feet
- Saddle bronc riding
- Tie-down roping - Also known as calf roping
- Barrel racing
- Bull riding

Novice championship titles are also awarded to the individuals who earn the most money in their event:

- Novice bareback riding
- Novice saddle bronc riding
- Junior steer riding

== See also ==
- List of Canadian Professional Rodeo Association Champions
- List of festivals in Alberta
- Calgary Stampede, Canada's largest rodeo
- Raymond Stampede, Canada's oldest rodeo
