= Logue (surname) =

Logue is a family name derived from the Irish Ó Maolmhuaidh, anglicized to Ó Laoghog and Mulvogue. Principally from County Londonderry and County Donegal.

Notable persons with the surname include:

- Alexandra W. Logue, American academic and behavioral scientist
- Alison Logue, Australian soccer player for 2009 Newcastle Jets
- Amanda Logue, subject of 2013 Snapped: Killer Couples episode
- Antonia Logue (born 1972), Irish novelist
- Bob Logue, Calgary Stampede Rodeo Bareback champion 1992
- Cailie Logue, American collegiate 10K runner
- Calvin Logue, signer of the 1861 Georgia Ordinance of Secession
- Charles Logue (1858-1919), Irish-American builder
- Charles A. Logue (1889–1938), American screenwriter
- Charles T. Logue (1922-2000), American politician
- Charlie Logue, member of Irish folk rock band Goats Don't Shave
- Christian Logue, member of American metal band Savage Grace
- Christopher Logue (1926–2011), English poet
- Chuck Logue, Calgary Stampede Rodeo Bareback champion 2001
- Courtland L. Logue, Jr., American businessman, founder of EZCorp
- Dale Logue, contestant involved in The Big Surprise quiz show scandal
- Dan Logue, (1950–2021), American politician
- Dave Logue, American actor in The Junkman
- David Logue, Northern Irish 3000m steeplechase runner
- Deirdre Logue (born 1964), Irish-Canadian video artist and arts administrator; twin sister of Donal Logue
- Donal Logue (born 1965), Irish-Canadian actor
- Edward Logue (1813–1865), founder of Kent Town Brewery, South Australia, grandfather of Lionel Logue
- Edward J. Logue (1921–2000), American urban planner and public administrator
- Elizabeth Logue, American actress in New Faces of 1952
- Elizabeth Malamalamaokalani Logue, Hawaiian-Chinese-English model in opening title sequence of Hawaii Five-O
- Florence Logue Koontz, mother of author Dean Koontz
- Frank Logue (1924–2010), mayor of New Haven, Connecticut 1976-1979
- Frank S. Logue (born 1963), American clergyman
- Gerard Logue, Northern Irishman killed in 1985 in Belfast by UK law enforcement officers
- Griffin Logue (born 1998), Australian rules footballer
- Hazel Logue Treweek (1920–2006), Australian academic, teacher and Shakespearean scholar
- Hugh Logue (born 1949), Northern Irish politician and economist
- Jake Logue (born 1972), American football player
- James Logue (born 1939), American ice hockey goaltender
- James Logue (born 1989), Irish hurler
- James Logue, Scottish politician
- James Logue, mayor of Harvard, Illinois 1896-1899
- James Washington Logue (1863–1925), American politician
- Jarm Logue (1813-1872), African-American clergyman and abolitionist
- Jay Logue, Chief of the Nevada Capitol Police 2010-2012
- Jim Logue, American golf club professional and PGA Cup participant 1974, 1982, 1983
- Jim Logue, early promoter of Ryū-te martial arts in the United States
- Jimmy Logue (1837-1899), American criminal
- Joan Logue (born 1942), American video artist
- John Logue, IMCA Super Nationals winner 1995, 1998, 1999, 2001, 2003
- John Logue, American director of multiple episodes of The PJs animated sitcom
- John Logue, co-author of In The Arena with Pat Dye
- John G. Logue, American lawyer, owner of Logue House
- John J. Logue, American politician
- John R. Logue, American writer of The Deadly Hillbillies
- Jordan Logue, production engineer on MercyMe, It's Christmas! album
- Joseph Logue, principal in the United States v. Joseph Logue PTSD case
- Joseph Logue De La Cour (1894-1967), American politician
- Josh Logue, Australian director of Empire of the Sun and other videos
- Julian Logue, Irish professional snooker player, Northern Ireland Amateur Championship winner 1995
- Julie Logue (born 1971), Irish cricketer
- Karina Logue, Canadian actress in NCIS: Los Angeles (season 8) and other productions, sister of Donal Logue
- Kerry Logue, American 420 dinghy sailor, North American club champion 2000
- Kyle D. Logue, American law professor
- Larry M. Logue, American historian, co-author of The Civil War Soldier: A Historical Reader and other works
- Lionel Logue (1880–1953), Australian speech therapist, major character in The King's Speech
- Louis Logue Armét (1914-1981), American architect
- Major Logue (1826-1900), Western Australia politician
- Mark Logue, British co-author of The King's Speech: How One Man Saved the British Monarchy
- Mark Logue, English footballer for Parishes of Jersey football team
- Mary Logue, American author of Sleep Like a Tiger, wife of Pete Hautman
- Matt Logue, American animator for The Chronicles of Narnia: The Lion, the Witch and the Wardrobe
- Maurice Logue, Irish rugby coach for Tullow RFC
- Michael Logue (1840–1924), Irish prelate of the Roman Catholic Church
- Michael Logue, five-time Australian Quiz Championship winner
- Niall Logue (born 1985), Northern Irish footballer
- Patricia Logue, Londonderry city councillor 2019
- Paul Logue, writer for the Scottish crime drama series Shetland
- Penellope "Penny" Logue, founder of the Tenacious Unicorn Ranch
- Pete Logue, member of the K&A Gang
- Dr. R. Bruce Logue, co-editor of Hurst's the Heart medical textbook
- Rachel Logue, American voice artist on the Japanese manga series Btooom!
- Ronald Logue, American businessman
- Ronnie Logue, member of The Gap band
- Rory Logue, British member of the FaZe Clan entertainment organization
- Rose Logue, Clarion, Pennsylvania borough council member
- Sarah E. Logue, American Internet radio host known professionally as Sarah X Dylan
- Shawn Logue, American film editor on Mosaic
- Stephen Logue, American video game producer of Dragonia
- Suzette Logue, American Boston Ballet II dancer
- Thomas Logue, Chief Judge for the Florida Third District Court of Appeal, appointed 2012
- Thomas A. Logue, American politician
- Zach Logue, American professional baseball player
- Zion Logue (born 2001), American football player

== See also ==
=== Characters ===
- Logue, character in 1993 science fiction novel Flux
- Astra Logue and Alex Logue, characters in Hellblazer mythos
- Brilburn Logue, pseudonym used by Alan Moore
- Marcus Logue, character on 2008-2013 British television series Being Human
- Meredith Logue, character in 1955 novel The Talented Mr. Ripley

=== Places ===
- Logue, town in Burkino Faso
- Logue Brook, Western Australia
- Logue Brook Dam, Western Australia
- Logue's Brewery, Adelaide
- Logue House, Houston
- Logue Library, Chestnut Hill College

=== Other ===
- Drama-Logue Award, American theater award
- Dreamy-Logue, 2000 mini-album by Japanese group Dialogue
- One Piece: Logue Town Chapter, 2000 novel by Eiichiro Oda
- Lake Logue wattle (Acacia vittata), Australian plant
- Logue, 2009 short film by Hitoshi Kumatani
- Logue, Inc., 2009 short film by Max Benator
- Loveleigh's Logue, play by Canadian writer Wendy Motion Brathwaite
- Okta Logue, German rock band
- The Marijuana-Logues, 2004 off-Broadway play
