= List of Calgary Stampede Rodeo Champions =

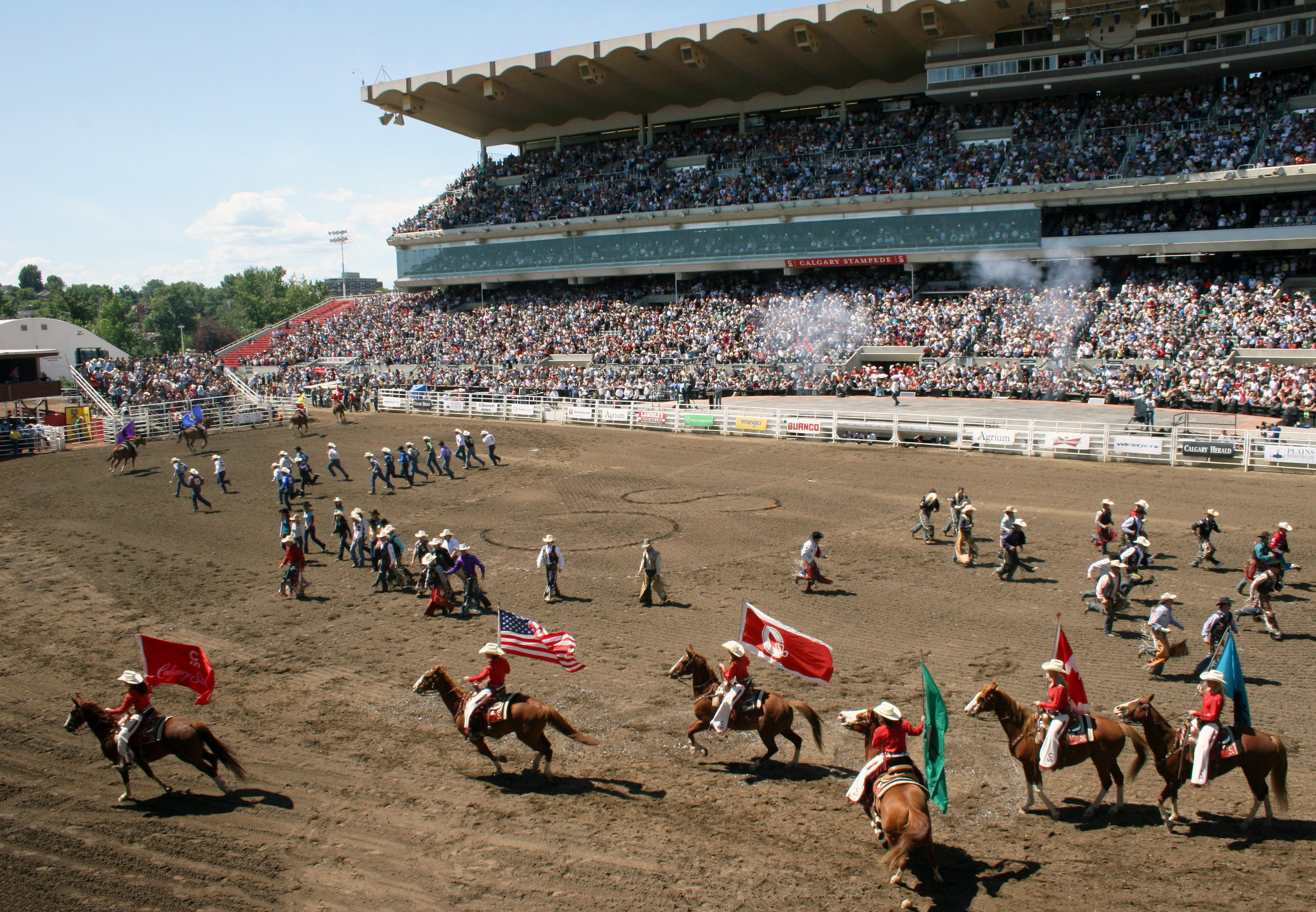
Finalists on the last day of 2011 Calgary Stampede.

Calgary Stampede rodeo champions have won their respective events in one of the largest rodeos in the world; the rodeo is the heart of the Calgary Stampede. It is held at GMC Stadium. With a prize of $50,000 to the winner of each major discipline, it offers one of the richest payouts in rodeo competition. In the United States, the Calgary Stampede rodeo is televised live on The Cowboy Channel and live-streamed on the subscription-based Cowboy Channel+ app. In Canada, the rodeo is televised live on The Cowboy Channel's Canadian counterpart, The Cowboy Channel Canada.

There are seven major professional events – bull riding, ladies' barrel racing, steer wrestling, ladies' breakaway roping, tie down roping, saddle bronc riding and bareback riding – and four novice events – junior steer riding, novice bareback, novice saddle bronc and wild pony racing. Each professional event is organized as its own tournament, and the cowboys and cowgirls are divided into three pools with 10 contestants per event. The first pool competes the first three days, the second pool competes the next three days, then the third pool competes the following three days. The top four in each pool (four fastest combined times in tie-down roping, steer wrestling and barrel racing, and four highest combined scores in bareback riding, saddle bronc riding and bull riding) advance to the last day's semifinal round. The top four in each event then advance to the final round, where all previous results are wiped clean. The contestant with the fastest time or highest score in each event wins the trophy bronze and accompanying $50,000. Team roping was added in 2022. However, unlike the other rodeo events, it is limited to one day and the competition is called the Rocky Mountain Cup. It takes place at the Nutrien Western Event Centre and there are 30 teams at the event who compete in the first two rounds. The eight fastest teams then return for the semifinal round, and the top four then advance to the clean-slate final round where the fastest team wins the trophy bronze and $12,500 per member. Ladies' breakaway roping was added to the Rocky Mountain Cup in 2023. Just like in team roping, 30 ropers competed in the first two rounds, followed by the eight fastest ropers in the semifinal round, then the top four competed in the clean-slate final round where the fastest breakaway roper won the trophy bronze and $12,500. In 2025, breakaway roping was added as part of the other six rodeo events at the Calgary Stampede rodeo at GMC Stadium. The Rocky Mountain Cup continues as a team-roping event at the Nutrien Western Event Centre. In 2025, it became its own separate three-day event and took place one month after the completion of the Calgary Stampede. The prize money for first place also doubled to $25,000 per team-roping member. In 2026, the Rocky Mountain Cup returned as a one-day event as part of the Calgary Stampede and the prize money for first place doubled to $50,000.

All livestock for the rodeo events come from the 22,000-acre (89 km^{2}) Stampede Ranch located near the town of Hanna. The ranch was created in 1961 as a means of improving the quality of bucking horses and bulls and to guarantee supply. The first of its kind in North America, the Stampede Ranch operates a breeding program that produces some of the top rodeo stock in the world and supplies rodeos throughout southern Alberta, and as far south as Las Vegas, Nevada, for the National Finals Rodeo.

== Past champions ==
This list includes all past Calgary Stampede rodeo champions from 1990 to the present.

=== Tie-down roping ===
- 2026 - Zack Jongbloed; Iowa, Louisiana, United States
- 2025 - Shad Mayfield; Clovis, New Mexico, United States
- 2024 - Haven Meged; Miles City, Montana, United States
- 2023 - Beau Cooper; Stettler, Alberta, Canada
- 2022 - Caleb Smidt; Bellville, Texas, United States
- 2021 - Cory Solomon; Prairie View, Texas, United States
- 2019 - Caleb Smidt; Bellville, Texas, United States
- 2018 - Tuf Cooper; Weatherford, TX, United States
- 2017 - Cory Solomon; Prairie View, Texas, United States
- 2016 - Shane Hanchey; Sulphur, Louisiana, United States
- 2015 - Timber Moore; Aubrey, Texas, United States
- 2014 - Morgan Grant; Granton, Ontario, Canada
- 2013 - Bradley Bynum; Sterling City, Texas, United States
- 2012 - Cory Solomon; Prairieview, Texas, United States
- 2011 - Tuf Cooper; Decatur, Texas, United States
- 2010 - Matt Shiozawa; Chubbuck, Idaho, United States
- 2009 - Ryan Jarrett; Summerville, Georgia, United States
- 2008 - Jeff Chapman; Athens, Texas, United States
- 2007 - Fred Whitfield; Hockley, Texas, United States
- 2006 - Jerome Schneeberger; Ponca City, Oklahoma, United States
- 2005 - Alwin Bouchard; Scandia, Alberta, Canada
- 2004 - Mike Johnson; Henryetta, Oklahoma, United States
- 2003 - Rickey Canton; Cleveland, Texas, United States
- 2002 - Marty Becker; Manyberries, Alberta, Canada
- 2001 - Fred Whitfield; Cypress, Texas, United States
- 2000 - Blair Burk; Durant, Oklahoma, United States
- 1999 - Cliff Williamson; Madden, Alberta, Canada
- 1998 - Cody Ohl; Orchard, Texas, United States
- 1997 - Jeff Chapman; Athens, Texas, United States
- 1996 - Roy Cooper; Childress, Texas, United States
- 1995 - Shawn McMullan; Iraan, Texas, United States
- 1994 - Joe Beaver; Huntsville, Texas, United States
- 1993 - Fred Whitfield; Cypress, Texas, United States
- 1992 - Kyle Kosoff; Ogden, Utah, United States
- 1991 - Mark Simon; Florence, Arizona, United States
- 1990 - Tod Slone; Canyon Lake, Texas, United States

=== Bareback riding ===
- 2026 - Bradlee Miller; Huntsville, Texas, United States
- 2025 - Cooper Cooke; Victor, Idaho, United States
- 2024 - R.C. Landingham; Hat Creek, California, United States
- 2023 - Kade Sonnier; Carencro, Louisiana, United States
- 2022 - Rocker Steiner; Weatherford, Texas, United States
- 2021 - Tim O’Connell; Zwingle, Iowa, United States
- 2019 - Tanner Aus; Granite Falls, Minnesota, United States
- 2018 - Richie Champion; Dublin, Texas, United States
- 2017 - Richie Champion; Dublin, Texas, United States
- 2016 - Steven Peebles; Redmond, Oregon, United States
- 2015 - Clint Laye; Cadogan, Alberta, Canada
- 2014 - Kaycee Feild; Elk Ridge, Utah, United States
- 2013 - Caleb Bennet; Morgan, Utah, United States
- 2012 - Kaycee Feild; Elk Ridge, Utah, United States
- 2011 - Clint Cannon; Waller, Texas, United States
- 2010 - Will Lowe; Canyon, Texas, United States
- 2009 - Will Lowe; Canyon, Texas, United States
- 2008 - Will Lowe; Canyon, Texas, United States
- 2007 - Davey Shields Jr.; Bashaw, Alberta, Canada
- 2006 - Davey Shields Jr.; Bashaw, Alberta, Canada
- 2005 - Davey Shields Jr.; Bashaw, Alberta, Canada
- 2004 - Cody DeMers; Boulder, Montana, United States
- 2003 - Jason Delguercio; Strathmore, Alberta, Canada
- 2002 - Cody Jessee; John Day, Oregon, United States
- 2001 - Chuck Logue; New Braunfels, Texas, United States
- 2000 - James Boudreaux; Cuero, Texas, United States
- 1999 - Chris Harris; Arlington, Texas, United States
- 1998 - Roger Lacasse; Edmonton, Alberta, Canada
- 1997 - Shawn Vant; Millet, Alberta, Canada
- 1996 - Davey Shields Jr.; Hanna, Alberta, Canada
- 1995 - Darrell Cholach; Okotoks, Alberta, Canada
- 1994 - Brian Hawk; Azle, Texas, United States
- 1993 - Marvin Garrett; Belle Fourche, South Dakota, United States
- 1992 - Bob Logue; Cumby, Texas, United States
- 1991 - Billy Laye; Bragg Creek, Alberta, Canada
- 1990 - Deb Greenough; Fromberg, Montana, United States

=== Steer wrestling ===
- 2026 - Riley Duvall; Checotah, Oklahoma, United States
- 2025 - Scott Guenthner; Provost, Alberta, Canada
- 2024 - Ty Erickson; Helena, Montana, United States
- 2023 - Scott Guenthner; Consort, Alberta, Canada
- 2022 - Will Lummus; Byhalia, Mississippi, United States
- 2021 - Stetson Jorgensen; Blackfoot, Idaho, United States
- 2019 - Kyle Irwin; Robertsdale, Alabama, United States
- 2018 - Matt Reeves; Cross Plains, Texas, United States
- 2017 - Tyler Waguespack; Gonzales, Louisiana, United States
- 2016 - Seth Brockman; Wheatland, Wyoming, United States
- 2015 - Trevor Knowles; Mt. Vernon, Oregon, United States
- 2014 - Trevor Knowles; Mt. Vernon, Oregon, United States
- 2013 - Wade Sumpter; Fowler, Colorado, United States
- 2012 - Trevor Knowles; Mt. Vernon, Oregon, United States
- 2011 - Straws Milan; Cochrane, Alberta, Canada
- 2010 - Lee Graves; Calgary, Alberta, Canada
- 2009 - Trevor Knowles; Mt. Vernon, Oregon, United States
- 2008 - Wade Sumpter; Fowler, Colorado, United States
- 2007 - Shawn Greenfield; Lakeview, Oregon, United States
- 2006 - Curtis Cassidy; Donalda, Alberta, Canada
- 2005 - Beau Franzen; Goodwell, Oklahoma, United States
- 2004 - Bryan Fields; Conroe, Texas, United States
- 2003 - Jeff Corbello; Iowa, Louisiana, United States
- 2002 - Bill Pace; Stephenville, Texas, United States
- 2001 - Greg Cassidy; Donalda, Alberta, Canada
- 2000 - Daryl Fisher; Pincher Creek, Alberta, Canada
- 1999 - Mickey Gee; Wichita Falls, Texas, United States
- 1998 - Jesse Peterson; Dillon, Montana, United States
- 1997 - David Roy; Carseland, Alberta, Canada
- 1996 - Todd Boggust; Paynton, Saskatchewan, Canada
- 1995 - Vince Walker; Brentwood, California, United States
- 1994 - Steve Duhon; Opelousas, Louisiana, United States
- 1993 - David Roy; Carseland, Alberta, Canada
- 1992 - Joe Butterfield; Ponoka, Alberta, Canada
- 1991 - Blaine Pederson; Amisk, Alberta, Canada
- 1990 - Greg Cassidy; Donalda, Alberta, Canada

=== Saddle bronc riding ===
- 2026 - Wyatt Casper; Miami, Texas, United States
- 2025 - Zeke Thurston; Big Valley, Alberta, Canada
- 2024 - Kade Bruno; Challis, Idaho, United States
- 2023 - Dawson Hay; Wildwood, Alberta, Canada
- 2022 - Logan Hay; Wildwood, Alberta, Canada
- 2021 - Brody Cress; Hillsdale, Wyoming, United States
- 2019 - Rusty Wright; Milford, Utah, United States
- 2018 - Ryder Wright; Milford, Utah, United States
- 2017 - Zeke Thurston; Big Valley, Alberta, Canada
- 2016 - Zeke Thurston; Big Valley, Alberta, Canada
- 2015 - Zeke Thurston; Big Valley, Alberta, Canada
- 2014 - Dustin Flundra; Pincher Creek, Alberta, Canada
- 2013 - Cort Scheer; Elsmere, Nebraska, United States
- 2012 - Wade Sundell; Boxholm, Iowa, United States
- 2011 - Chad Ferley; Oelrichs, South Dakota, United States
- 2010 - Wade Sundell; Boxholm, Iowa, United States
- 2009 - Taos Muncy; Corona, New Mexico, United States
- 2008 - Cody Wright; Milford, Utah, United States
- 2007 - Cody DeMoss; Heflin, Louisiana, United States
- 2006 - Cody Wright; Milford, Utah, United States
- 2005 - Rod Hay; Wildwood, Alberta, Canada
- 2004 - Dan Mortensen; Billings, Montana, United States
- 2003 - Rod Warren; Valleyview, Alberta, Canada
- 2002 - Rod Hay; Wildwood, Alberta, Canada
- 2001 - Ross Kreutzer; Maple Creek, Saskatchewan, Canada
- 2000 - Dan Mortensen; Billings, Montana, United States
- 1999 - Rod Hay; Mayerthorpe, Alberta, Canada
- 1998 - Denny Hay; Mayerthorpe, Alberta, Canada
- 1997 - Steve Dollarhide; Wikieup, Arizona, United States
- 1996 - Billy Etbauer; Heights, South Dakota, United States
- 1995 - Glen O’Neill; Kempsey, New South Wales, Australia
- 1994 - Rod Hay; Mayerthorpe, Alberta, Canada
- 1993 - Kent Cooper; Albion, Idaho, United States
- 1992 - Rod Warren; Valleyview, Alberta, Canada
- 1991 - Dwayne Pillman; Wainwright, Alberta, Canada
- 1990 - Duane Daines; Innisfail, Alberta, Canada

=== Barrel racing ===
- 2026 - Hailey Kinsel; Cotulla, Texas, United States
- 2025 - Anita Ellis; Blackfoot, Idaho, United States
- 2024 - Leslie Smalygo; Skiatook, Oklahoma, United States
- 2023 - Brittany Pozzi Tonozzi; Lampasas, Texas, United States
- 2022 - Kassie Mowry; Dublin, Texas, United States
- 2021 - Bertina Olafson; Hudson Bay, Saskatchewan, Canada
- 2019 - Lisa Lockhart; Oelrichs, South Dakota, United States
- 2018 - Hailey Kinsel; Cotulla, Texas, United States
- 2017 - Tiany Schuster; Krum, Texas, United States
- 2016 - Mary Burger; Pauls Valley, Oklahoma, United States
- 2015 - Lisa Lockhart; Oelrichs, South Dakota, United States
- 2014 - Kaley Bass; Kissimmee, Florida, United States
- 2013 - Jean Winters; Texline, Texas, United States
- 2012 - Sue Smith; Blackfoot, Idaho, United States
- 2011 - Sydni Blanchard; Albuquerque, New Mexico, United States
- 2010 - Savanah Reeves; Cross Planis, Texas, United States
- 2009 - Tammy Key-Fischer; Ledbetter, Texas, United States
- 2008 - Lindsay Sears; Nanton, Alberta, Canada
- 2007 - Tana Poppino; Big Cabin, Oklahoma, United States
- 2006 - Joleen Seitz; Savona, British Columbia, Canada
- 2005 - Molly Powell; Stephenville, Texas, United States
- 2004 - Debbie Renger; Okotoks, Alberta, Canada
- 2003 - Charmayne James; Athens, Texas, United States
- 2002 - Jill Besplug; Claresholm, Alberta, Canada
- 2001 - Jill Besplug; Claresholm, Alberta, Canada
- 2000 - Sherry Cervi; Marana, Arizona, United States
- 1999 - Rachael Myllymaki; Arlee, Montana, United States
- 1998 - Cheyenne Wimberly; Stephenville, Texas, United States
- 1997 - Kristie Peterson; Elbert, Colorado, United States
- 1996 - Sharon Smith; Dibble, Oklahoma, United States
- 1995 - Vana Beissinger; Lake Worth, Florida, United States
- 1994 - Sharon Kobold; Big Horn, Wyoming, United States
- 1993 - Sharon Kobold; Big Horn, Wyoming, United States
- 1992 - Charmayne James; Galt, California, United States
- 1991 - Vana Beissinger; Lake Worth, Florida, United States
- 1990 - Marlene Eddleman; Ramah, Colorado, United States

=== Bull riding ===
- 2026 - Noah Lee; Mineral Wells, Texas, United States
- 2025 - Wacey Schalla; Arapaho, Oklahoma, United States
- 2024 - Chase Dougherty; Canby, Oregon, United States / Jeff Askey; Athens, Texas, United States (tie)
- 2023 - Jared Parsonage; Maple Creek, Saskatchewan, Canada
- 2022 - Shane Proctor; Grand Coulee, Washington, United States / Dakota Buttar; Eatonia, Saskatchewan, Canada (tie)
- 2021 - Jordan Hansen; Amisk, Alberta, Canada
- 2019 - Sage Kimzey; Strong City, Oklahoma, United States
- 2018 - Marcos Gloria; Central de Minas, Minas Gerais, Brazil
- 2017 - Sage Kimzey; Strong City, Oklahoma, United States
- 2016 - Cody Teel; Kountze, Texas, United States
- 2015 - Sage Kimzey; Strong City, Oklahoma, United States
- 2014 - Scott Schiffner; Strathmore, Alberta, Canada
- 2013 - J.B. Mauney; Mooresville, North Carolina, United States
- 2012 - Chad Besplug; Claresholm, Alberta, Canada
- 2011 - Shane Proctor; Mooresville, North Carolina, United States
- 2010 - Douglas Duncan; Alvin, Texas, United States
- 2009 - J.B. Mauney; Mooresville, North Carolina, United States
- 2008 - Mike Lee; Decatur, Texas, United States
- 2007 - Brian Canter; Randleman, North Carolina, United States
- 2006 - Ross Coleman; Molalla, Oregon, United States
- 2005 - Chris Hansen; Barrhead, Alberta, Canada
- 2004 - Robert Bowers; Brooks, Alberta, Canada
- 2003 - Justin Volz; Charlie Lake, British Columbia, Canada
- 2002 - Justin Volz; Charlie Lake, British Columbia, Canada
- 2001 - Scott Schiffner; Stettler, Alberta, Canada
- 2000 - Marty Broderson; Vauxhall, Alberta, Canada
- 1999 - Jason McDonald; Separ, New Mexico, United States
- 1998 - Ty Murray; Stephenville, Texas, United States
- 1997 - J.W. Hart; Marietta, Oklahoma, United States
- 1996 - Scott Breding; Edgar, Montana, United States
- 1995 - Scott Breding; Edgar, Montana, United States
- 1994 - Adriano Moraes; Cachoeira Paulista, São Paulo, Brazil
- 1993 - Jim Sharp; Kermit, Texas, United States
- 1992 - Ted Nuce; Manteca, California, United States
- 1991 - Troy Dunn; Mackay, Queensland, Australia
- 1990 - Wacey Cathey; Big Spring, Texas, United States

=== Team roping ===
- 2026 - Korbin Rice; Hobbs, New Mexico, United States (header) / Cooper Freeman; Carthage, Missouri, United States (heeler)
- 2025 - Andrew Ward; Edmond, Oklahoma, United States (header) / Jake Long; Coffeyville, Kansas, United States (heeler)
- 2024 - J.C. Yeahquo; Mandaree, North Dakota, United States (header) / Kollin VonAhn; Blanchard, Oklahoma (heeler)
- 2023 - Coleman Proctor; Pryor, Oklahoma, United States (header) / Logan Medlin; Tatum, New Mexico, United States (heeler)
- 2022 - Clint Summers; Lake City, Florida, United States (header) / Ross Ashford; Lott, Texas, United States (heeler)

=== Breakaway roping ===
- 2026 - Cheyanne McCartney; Kingston, Oklahoma, United States
- 2025 - Shelbi Boisjoli-Meged; Langdon, Alberta, Canada
- 2024 - Kelsie Domer; Dublin, Texas, United States
- 2023 - Taylor Munsell; Alva, Oklahoma, United States
