= Acacia vittata =

Lake Logue wattle

Conservation status
- Priority Two — Poorly Known Taxa (DEC)

Scientific classification
- Kingdom: Plantae
- Clade: Tracheophytes
- Clade: Angiosperms
- Clade: Eudicots
- Clade: Rosids
- Order: Fabales
- Family: Fabaceae
- Subfamily: Caesalpinioideae
- Clade: Mimosoid clade
- Genus: Acacia
- Species: A. vittata

Binomial name
- Acacia vittata R.S.Cowan & Maslin
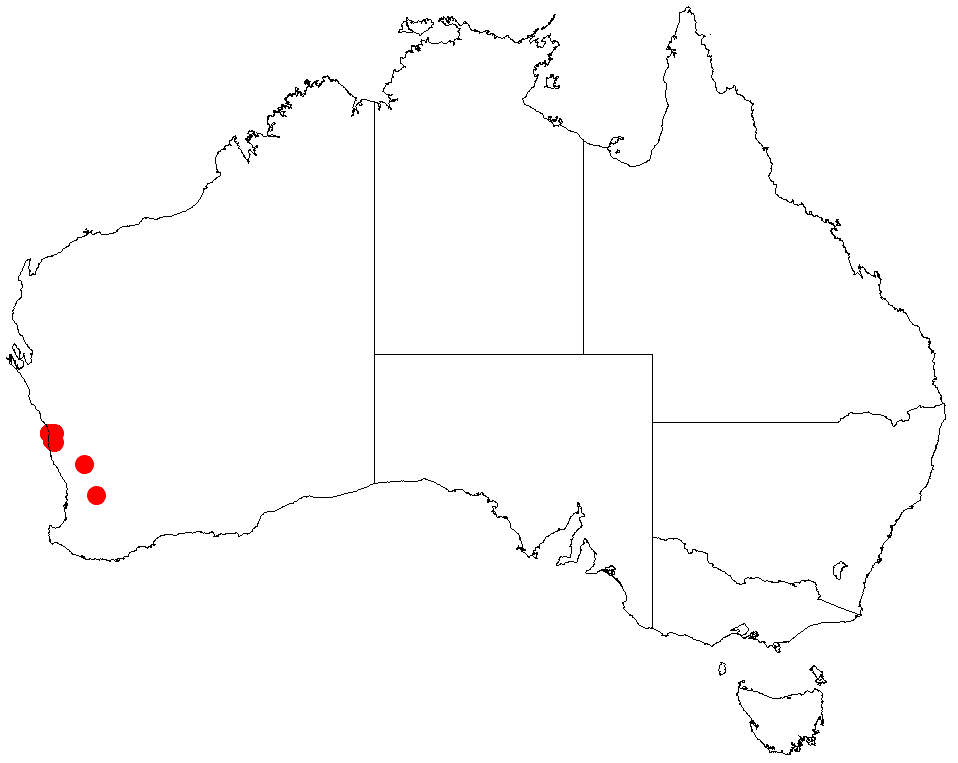
- Occurrence data from AVH

Species of legume

Acacia vittata, commonly known as Lake Logue wattle, is a shrub of the genus Acacia and the subgenus Plurinerves that is endemic to a small area in western Australia.

== Description ==
The dense shrub typically grows to a height of 1 to 4 metres (3 to 13 ft) and has a rounded habit with longitudinally striped branchlets with green and glabrous epidermis and brownish, resinous hairy bands. Like most species of Acacia it has phyllodes rather than true leaves. The ascending to erect, leathery and glabrous evergreen phyllodes have a narrowly elliptic to narrowly oblong-elliptic shape and are straight to slightly curved with a length of 3 to 5.5 cm (1.2 to 2.2 in) and a width of 3.5 to 7 mm (0.14 to 0.28 in) and have many slightly raised main nerves some of which are resinous and white. It blooms in August and produces yellow flowers. The simple inflorescences occur as groups of two or three spherical flower-heads that have a diameter of 4.5 mm (0.18 in) and contain 29 to 31 golden coloured flowers. The leathery, hairy and resinous seed pods that form after flowering are quite undulate but are not constricted between the seeds and have a length of up to 3 cm (1.2 in) and a width of 4 to 5 mm (0.16 to 0.20 in) with longitudinally arranged seeds inside. The brown-black to dark brown slightly shiny seeds have a widely elliptic to oblong-elliptic shape with a length of 3 to 4 mm (0.12 to 0.16 in) with a creamy-white aril.

== Taxonomy ==
The species was first formally described by the botanists Richard Sumner Cowan and Bruce Maslin in 1999 as a part of the work Acacia miscellany 17. Miscellaneous new taxa and lectotypifications in Western Australian Acacia, mostly section Plurinerves (Leguminosae: Mimosoideae) as published in the journal Nuytsia. It was reclassified in 2003 by Leslie Pedley as Racosperma vittatum, then transferred back to genus Acacia in 2006. A. vittata belongs to the Acacia flavipila group of wattles and is thought to be closely related to Acacia verricula, the phyllodes closely resemble those of Acacia recurvata.

== Distribution ==
It is native to an area in the Mid West regions of Western Australia where it is commonly situated along the edges of seasonal lakes growing in sandy to sandy-clay soils. It has a limited range near Eneabba especially around Lake Eneabba and is usually a part of low woodland or low open forest communities.

== See also ==
- List of Acacia species
