= Elite Rodeo Athletes =

Professional rodeo organization

- Sport: Rodeo
- Founded: 2015
- Countries: United States

The Elite Rodeo Athletes (ERA) was a professional rodeo organization founded in 2015. Its only season was in 2016, and it ceased operations the following year.

== Background ==
Men's rodeo sports have long been governed by the Professional Rodeo Cowboys Association (PRCA). In 2015, approximately 5,000 cowboys and cowgirls purchased membership in the PRCA. Membership allows them to compete at the 624 PRCA-sanctioned rodeos. Rodeos sanctioned by the PRCA must follow a defined format, offering a full set of required events. These rodeos have little control over which cowboys would compete, as they must use the PRCA's registration system, and are required to give the PRCA a percentage of the purse. Cowboys earn money only when they are among the top finishers at a rodeo event. In many cases, a win will earn them no more than $1,000. Each dollar of prize money earned at PRCA-sanctioned events is counted towards qualification for the annual National Finals Rodeo. There is no weighting for level of competition; a dollar earned at a rodeo against performed ranked in the top 20 counts the same as a dollar earned at a rodeo when competing against people who only ride once a year. In their attempts to become one of the 15 people in each event who qualify for the NFR, many cowboys compete at 100 or more rodeos per year, travelling more than 100,000 miles (160,000 km) per year. The 2014 PRCA world champions had annual earnings of $200,000 - $500,000. The costs of travel and the entry fees for these rodeos can become a considerable monetary burden; those who don't qualify for the NFR, with its large purse, can be put in a considerable financial bind.

Female competitors, primarily barrel racers, are governed by the Women's Professional Rodeo Association. Members of the WPRA compete at PRCA-sanctioned rodeos and can qualify for the NFR.

Not all rodeos are affiliated with the PRCA. After a series of lawsuits in the 1980s, cowboys earned the right to participate in both PRCA and independent rodeos. In 1992, 20 bull riders formed the Professional Bull Riders (PBR). They launched a tour of bull riding champions who also participated in the PRCA. The success of the PBR inspired the PRCA a decade later to create several small televised tours featuring champion rodeo athletes and offering large prizes. When a new PRCA commissioner took over in 2004, the PRCA was deeply in debt; he refocused the organization on the traditional competitions and not its stars.

One of the premier indoor rodeos, the Houston Livestock Show and Rodeo, received a waiver to test changes to the rodeo format. They offered fewer events, had a faster pace, and implemented a playoff-style competition. By using their own registration system, Houston was able to invite specific cowboys to specific days and advertise their individual appearances. Attendance jumped. When the PRCA refused to renew the waiver in 2011, Houston became independent. In 2014, a new independent rodeo, The American in Arlington, Texas, was launched with a similar format and one of the highest purses in rodeo. Then PRCA commissioner, Karl Stressman, called this "the 'Showdeo' business" and blamed it, and organizations like the PBR, for a steady decline in PRCA membership. Houston was unsanctioned from 2011 to 2018, before becoming a PRCA-sanctioned rodeo again in 2019. The American was unsanctioned from 2014 to 2018, before becoming a PRCA-sanctioned rodeo in 2019. However, it became unsanctioned again in 2022.

== Formation ==
Many of the elite cowboys became frustrated with the PRCA. They could see the success of the independent rodeos with large purses. They were tired with the pace and cost of the travel necessary to become NFR-qualified under the current guidelines. Fourteen of the elite athletes, two from each event, banded together to lobby the PRCA changes. These men included world champions Bobby Mote and Trevor Brazile. In discussions with PRCA representatives, they asked that two additional professional cowboys sit on the eleven-member PRCA board. Four contestants were already members of the board; decisions required seven votes. The cowboys even offered to stop competing at unsanctioned rodeos if contestant representation on the board was increased. When the PRCA declined to consider their offer, the men asked for a formal meeting, scheduled for February 2014. The PRCA sent lower-level representatives with no decision-making authority, infuriating the cowboys. The following morning, Brazile's agent, Tony Garritano, was able to get the men a conference call with the PRCA board. They categorically refused to entertain the possibility of a current competitor on the board. That was the last straw for the elite cowboys.

The ERA was formed as a for-profit organization collectively owned by its competitors. They planned to compete against each other at several rodeos around the country, culminating in a world championship at the end of their season. Garritano became the first president. According to Garritano, having a professional tour of elite athletes would inspire kids to want to join the sport. Because the ERA only accepts competitors already at the top of their field, newcomers to the sport would have to join the PRCA, thus benefiting the sport as a whole.

The PRCA promptly changed their bylaws. Cowboys with financial interest in any other rodeo association would be denied membership in the PRCA beginning with the 2016 season. ERA members would be disqualified from all PRCA rodeos, including the NFR. This held sweeping consequences; almost 50 of the competitors at the 2015 NFR were shareholders in the ERA. In November 2015, the ERA filed a class-action antitrust lawsuit against the PRCA, with Bobby Mote, Trevor Brazile, and Ryan Motes as plaintiffs. Between them, the men had won 17 PRCA world championships. Federal district court judge Barbara Lynn ordered that the men could compete at PRCA circuit while she considered a preliminary injunction. Lynn denied the preliminary injunction in February 2016, although the antitrust lawsuit was allowed to proceed. The ruling came near the end of the multi-day Fort Worth Stock Show & Rodeo. ERA shareholders were forced to withdraw from the Fort Worth competition and forced to return any prize money they had earned. Soon after, the plaintiffs dropped their lawsuit against the PRCA, issuing a statement saying that they "concluded that it is better for them, the E.R.A. Tour and the sport of rodeo to avoid the distraction of an expensive and long legal battle with the P.R.C.A. for now."

According to the ERA, 85% of their shareholders chose to retain their ERA shares and sit out the PRCA season. The remaining 15% turned in their shares, but remained registered as ERA competitors. This allowed them to compete in both PRCA and ERA-sanctioned rodeos. Barrel racers were not affected, as the WPRA did not prohibit their members from holding financial interests in other rodeo associations. Several past world champions chose not to rejoin the PRCA, including Mote, Tuf Cooper, Kaycee Feild, and Luke Branquino. Among those giving up their shares were Junior Nogueira and Zeke Thurston, both of whom won world championships at the 2016 NFR.

== 2016 season ==
The inaugural ERA season was loosely modeled on the PBR. Each of the eight stops on the tour would have two nights of rodeo. A $200,000 jackpot would be split among those who placed at each stop. The tour dates were scheduled for times when there were no large PRCA-sanctioned rodeos being held. At the end of the season there would be a five-day championship, with a purse of $3 million. Each rodeo would be televised by Fox Sports 2. Champions would be named based on the number of points they had garnered throughout the ERA season. The higher the level of competition at a rodeo, the more points a winner would earn.

The ERA tour was committed to increasing the visibility of rodeo. Contestants held a one-hour meet-and-greet in the arena before each rodeo, allowing fans the opportunity for pictures.

The first ERA rodeo was held in Redmond, Oregon, on March 25 and 26. Other stops included Nampa, Idaho, West Valley City, Utah, Albuquerque, New Mexico, and Sheridan, Wyoming.

The Days of '47 Rodeo in Utah relinquished their PRCA sanctioning to become part of the ERA circuit. They structured the rodeo to all three days of qualification rounds. Selected cowboys would be invited to compete to join the ERA circuit. A fourth day of the rodeo showcased the ERA members and shareholders. The finale pit the top qualifiers against the winners of the ERA round. Guthrie Murray came through the qualifying rounds to win bull riding with an 87-point ride. Tyler Pearson had a 3.66 time to win steer wrestling. Team roping was won by Clay Tryan and Jade Corkill, with a 3.72 time. In saddle bronc riding, Zeke Thurston took first with 87.5 points. Tuf Cooper won tie-down roping with a 6.84. Steven Peebles was named bareback riding champion with an 87.0-point score, and Chayni Chamberlain won barrel racing with 13.50 seconds.

After ERA President, Tony Garritano left the organization, Mote became interim president.

Attendance did not meet predictions. ERA organizers cancelled the last three planned rodeos, in St. Louis, Missouri, Atlanta, Georgia, and New Orleans, Louisiana, and trimmed the championship event from five days to three. Mote attributed the cancellations to growing pains, saying, "There are some things we assumed, and some we got right and some we got wrong, so we're adjusting based on what we've learned." According to Mote, the organization had underestimated the extent to which urban dwellers could recognize the differing caliber of rodeo athletes. While audiences in many of the middle and small markets recognized the names of the champion rodeo competitors and wanted to follow them, those in larger markets saw no difference between champion-quality performances and regular rodeos. Furthermore, the ERA realized that they had mistimed some of the rodeos; they were more likely to fill the indoor arenas in the winter, when people were looking for activities indoors.

Cowboys who had not been selected to join the ERA were able to earn their way into the ERA championships. The ERA partnered with the Mesquite Championship Rodeo in Mesquite, Texas. This rodeo held weekly events in a playoff-style format to choose two competitors in each discipline to go to the ERA championships.

The championships were held in Dallas, Texas on November 11–13. They served as a qualifier to the 2017 edition of The American. Team ropers Clay Tryan and Jade Corkill were named the champions for their event. They placed first in two of the three rounds, which gave them the most points for the year. In barrel racing, Kassie Mowry won all three rounds of the championship, but Lisa Lockhart was named world champion for having the most points on the season. Steven Dent was named bareback riding champion, Bray Armes became the steer wrestling champion, Cort Scheer won the title for saddle bronc riding, Shane Hanchey became champion of tie-down roping, and Chandler Bownds was named top bull rider.

== 2017 season ==
The ERA had announced that the top 7 competitors in each event, according to 2016 point totals, would be invited to join the 2017 ERA Premier Tour. However, the ERA cancelled the 2017 season. Mote announced that this did not mean that the organization was folding. Instead, the ERA was taking more time to plan and organize. By leaving their schedule free for a year, it gave the competitors the chance to return temporarily to the PRCA to earn a living.

The PRCA insisted that all applying for membership the 2017 season (which began in late 2016) sign an affidavit stating they held no financial interest in other rodeo associations. The WPRA followed the PRCA, refusing membership cards to ERA shareholders beginning in 2017. Although the ERA refused to comment on their membership, as of December 19, 2016, 43 ERA contestants, including Brazile, Branquino, and Cooper, had competed at a PRCA-sanctioned rodeo.

== World Champions Rodeo Alliance ==
After the ERA's collapse, Bobby Mote, now retired from bareback bronc riding, got together with a group of fellow rodeo enthusiasts and formed the World Champions Rodeo Alliance (WCRA) in 2018, with Mote as its president.

The WCRA lasted for seven years, before shutting down in the summer of 2025.
