= Ty Erickson =

American steer wrestler

Personal information
- Nickname: Ty Erickson
- Born: August 11, 1990 (age 36) Helena, Montana, US
- Height: 6 ft 6 in (1.98 m) (2019)
- Weight: 240 lb (110 kg) (2019)

Sport
- Sport: Rodeo
- Event: Steer wrestling
- Turned pro: 2011

Achievements and titles
- Regional finals: 2008–2009 National High School Rodeo Association
- National finals: 2010 National Intercollegiate Rodeo Association Big Sky Region Steer Wrestling Champion
- Highest world ranking: 2019 PRCA Steer Wrestling World Champion; 2011 PRCA Steer Wrestling Rookie of the Year
- Personal best: 2016, 2019 The American Rodeo Steer Wrestling Champion

Ty Erickson (born August 11, 1990) is an American professional rodeo cowboy who specializes in steer wrestling. He competes in the Professional Rodeo Cowboys Association (PRCA) circuit. He is the 2011 PRCA Steer Wrestling Rookie of the Year and is the PRCA 2019 Steer Wrestling World Champion.

== Early life ==
Ty Erickson was born on August 11, 1990, in Helena, Montana. His father, Sid, is a veterinarian and equine chiropractor, who has competed in team roping, and his mother, Janet Bignell Erickson, is a health enhancement coordinator and gym teacher. She is also a barrel racing trainer and competitor, and a former Miss College Rodeo.

It was not until Erickson was a junior in Capital High School that he started competing in steer wrestling. In 2008 and 2009, he was the all-around champion in the National High School Rodeo Association (NHSRA). In 2010, in college, he was the National Intercollegiate Rodeo Association (NIRA) Big Sky Region steer wrestling champion. He also did some team roping in college with his cousin. At Montana State University (MSU) in Bozeman, he studied business marketing. Erickson qualified for the College National Finals Rodeo (CNFR) all four years he attended MSU.

== Career ==
Erickson began his professional steer-wrestling career when he joined the PRCA in 2011. Since then he has competed on the rodeo circuit every year. He qualified for the championship event, the National Finals Rodeo (NFR), six times: from 2014 to 2019. He also qualified for the National Circuit Finals Rodeo (NCFR) three times, in 2011, 2012, and 2016. He has won over $1 million in earnings in his professional career.

=== Season 2010 ===
In 2010, Erickson won several regional rodeos on the Montana Circuit. He won the Wild Horse Stampede in Wolf Point, Montana; and the Energy Town Pro Rodeo in Gillette, Wyoming. He also won the 50th Belt Rodeo in Belt, Montana; the Mission Mountain PRCA Rodeo in Polson, Montana; and the Drummond, Montana, PRCA Rodeo. He was co-champion at the Last Chance Stampede in Helena, Montana. He finished first in the Montana Circuit year-end standings. Some rodeos he won while competing on his permit, and he earned $10,740.

=== Season 2011 ===
In 2011, Erickson won several more regional rodeos in Montana, including the PRCA Kootenai River Rodeo in Libby and the Northeast Montana Fair and Rodeo in Glasgow. He reached the National Circuit Finals Rodeo and was the event leader earning $14,054 (this amount did not count in his official earnings). He finished 49th in the world standings, but finished first in the rookie standings, earning $22,007.

Erickson was still attending college when he was at the NFR to receive the PRCA Rookie of the Year award for steer wrestling. In fact, he was missing some classwork due to being in Las Vegas, Nevada. Only 11 cowboys from Montana had received the award since its inception, and Erickson was the second steer wrestler to earn it since the PRCA began splitting the award by event in 1977. "When the year first started, I didn't even think about rookie of the year," said Erickson, "I wanted to make the circuit finals again and the Canadian Finals." In January, he won the 2010 MPRC year-end circuit title and led Shawn Downing by more than $5,200 in the 2011 standings. In early July he earned his first circuit check. In Canada, he won more than $9,000. However, he did not qualify for the Canadian Finals Rodeo (CFR) as he had only entered 7 rodeos in Canada instead of the required 15. He mentioned two specific weekends that got him the gold buckle. One weekend included good money at notable rodeos in Alberta and Red Lodge, Montana, among others. A month later he won three more rodeos and a large check at Strathmore, Alberta.

Erickson traveled with Nick Stubblefield of Choteau, Montana. His horse was a 19-year-old named Cisco. "It wasn't until August that I thought it (rookie title) might be possible", Erickson said. "That weekend of August put me past those other guys and it gave me the lead. I kind of coasted from there." Erickson arrived in Las Vegas on Monday for the award ceremony on Tuesday to spend some time in the NFR atmosphere. "It really didn't sink in that I won it until I got here," he said. “Being here motivates me even more. It makes me want to practice even more to get to the next level. I would love to rodeo for $17,000 for 10 rounds."

=== Season 2012 ===
In 2012, Erickson won the Montana Circuit steer wrestling title in Great Falls, Montana.

Highlights of rodeos he won this season are the Drummond, Montana, PRCA Rodeo; the Chouteau County Fair and Rodeo in Fort Benton, Montana; and the Cody, Wyoming, Nite Rodeo on June 8. He was in 45th place in the world standings with a total of $24,488 in earnings.

=== Season 2013 ===
Highlights of rodeos he won in the 2013 season are the NILE ProRodeo in Billings, Montana, and co-champion of the Colorado State Fair and Rodeo in Pueblo, Colorado. He finished in 23rd place in the world standings with $42,502.

=== Season 2014 ===
Highlights of rodeos he won in 2014 are the Red Bluff Round-Up in Red Bluff, California; the Greeley Stampede in Greeley, Colorado; the Lea County Fair and PRCA Rodeo in Lovington, New Mexico. He also won the Butterfield Stage Days PRCA Rodeo in Bridgeport, Texas; the Mineral Wells Rodeo in Mineral Wells, Texas; and the Last Chance Stampede in Helena, Montana. Erickson qualified for the NFR this year.

In the NFR, he tied Kyle Irwin for the win in Round 8 with a 3.7-second time. He placed in four other rounds and finished second in the NFR Average. He moved up from No. 15 to No. 7 in the world standings as a result of his performance at the NFR. His final earnings for the year were $123,116.

=== Season 2015 ===
Highlights of Erikson's 2015 season include winning the California Rodeo Salinas in Salinas, California; the Farm-City Pro Rodeo in Hermiston, Oregon and the White Sulphur Springs Labor Day Rodeo in White Sulphur Springs, Montana. He also won the Montana's Biggest Weekend in Dillon, Montana. He also was the co-champion at the Last Chance Stampede in Helena, Montana. Erickson and his traveling partner, Clayton Hass, both rode Shakem, a horse co-owned by Erickson and the Kyler Ranch. Shakem was chosen as the 2015 AQHA Steer Wrestling Horse of the Year.

Erikson qualified for the NFR this season. He placed in seven rounds. He was 4th in the world standings at the end of year with $197,933 in earnings.

=== Season 2016 ===
Highlights of Erikson's 2016 season include winning the Red Bluff Round-Up in Red Bluff, California; and the Fallon County Fair & Rodeo in Baker, Montana. He also won the Livington Roundup in Livingston, Montana; and the Lynden PRCA Rodeo in Lynden, Washington.

On February 28, Erickson competed at The American Rodeo finals at AT&T Stadium in Arlington, Texas, for the first time. He won the steer wrestling championship and a prize of $100,000. Erickson wrestled his steer to the ground in 4.8 seconds in the shootout round and won the biggest check of his professional career thus far. At the time, The American was an unsanctioned rodeo, so the money won did not count towards the PRCA world standings.

He qualified for the NFR this year. He placed in three rounds. He ranked 13th in the NFR Average, and was 7th in the world standings. He had $145,673 in yearly earnings. Erickson came to Las Vegas, Nevada, as the world standings leader in steer wrestling. In one run, he was awarded a re-run on another steer. He took that steer down in 4 seconds and won a check for $11,000.

=== Season 2017 ===
Highlights of Erikson's 2017 season include winning the Guymon Pioneer Days Rodeo in Guymon, Oklahoma; the Dixie National Rodeo in Jackson, Mississippi; the Wild Horse Stampede in Wolf Point, Montana; and the Mountain Valley Stampede in Heber City, Utah. He also won the Rio Grande Valley Livestock Show & Rodeo in Mercedes, Texas; and the Wrangler Champions Challenge in Rapid City, South Dakota. He was co-champion at the Helldorado Days Rodeo in Las Vegas, Nevada. This year, Erickson won the Montana Pro Rodeo Circuit Finals in Great Falls, Montana.

This year, Erickson broke the PRCA record for money earned in a regular season for a steer wrestler. The previous record was set by Wade Sumpter at $130,000. Erickson earned $163,152 in his regular season.

Erickson qualified for the NFR for a fourth time this year. He was regarded as the favorite to win the world title. He headed into the NFR ranked No. 1 in the world standings with $163,151 in earnings. He had a lead of $52,200 over the second place wrestler, Olin Hannum who had $110,951. However, Erickson still had to be at his best, seeing how things turned out in 2016, where he lost at the last minute by slightly less than $2,200. Also, the horse he was competing on, Cadillac, was recently injured and was not available for the finals. Cadillac was a two-time steer wrestling horse of the year. His steer wrestling traveling partners, Kyle Irwin and Tyler Pearson, let him use their award-winning horse Scooter during the NFR instead.

He placed in six rounds this year and earned $100,115. He was leading the competition for the world championship until the ninth round, when a time of 26.8 seconds dropped him to seventh place. He had wanted to be the first steer wrestling world champion from Montana since Brad Ennis in 1997. He ultimately came second to his traveling companion, Tyler Pearson. Pearson, from Louisville, Mississippi, ended his year with $265,457 to capture his first gold buckle. Erickson, the leader in the world standings for most of the year, came in second with $263,267. He was 6th place in the NFR Average, and won $100,115 total at the NFR.

=== Season 2018 ===
This year's highlights include winning the Redding Rodeo in Redding, California; the Brighton Field Day Festival & Rodeo in Okeechobee, Florida; the Coleman PRCA Rodeo in Coleman, Texas. He also won the Bridger Summer Series in Bridger, Montana; and the White Sulphur Springs Labor Day Rodeo in White Sulphur Springs, Montana. On February 18, at the Brighton Arena, he set a new steer wrestling arena record with a 2.7-second time.

He qualified for the NFR this year for the 5th time. He placed in five rounds, and won the 9th round. He was 7th in the world standings, and had $170,880 in earnings. He was 9th in the NFR Average with an 87.6 second time on nine head.

=== Season 2019 ===
Highlights from this season include winning the World's Oldest Rodeo in Prescott, Arizona, in 9.1 seconds for two head, winning $5,871; the YMBL Championship Rodeo in Beaumont, Texas, winning $1,602; and the Belt PRCA Rodeo in Belt, Montana, winning $1,097. He was co-champion at the Ogden Pioneer Days in Ogden, Utah, in one of his quickest throws at 3.6 seconds; the co-champion at the Central Montana Ram Pro Rodeo in Lewistown, Montana, and co-champion at the Magic Valley Stampede in Filer, Idaho, in 3.5 seconds, winning $3,321.

On January 27, Erickson competed at the National Western Stock Show at the Denver Coliseum in Denver, Colorado, in the championship finals. Erickson became the biggest winner from the PRCA. Riding aboard two-time steer wresting horse of the year, Scooter (whose registered name is Canted Plan), Erickson won $10,024. He managed this by wrestling three steers to the ground in 11.9 seconds.

On March 3, Erickson won The American Rodeo at AT&T Stadium in Arlington, Texas, for a second time, capturing another check for $100,000. He won the final four shootout in steer wrestling. His time was 4.3 seconds, beating Hunter Cure by 1 second. Although Erickson also won in 2016, there was a big difference between the two. This year, the American Rodeo was now sanctioned by the PRCA with some of the winnings counting for the world standings. Erickson rode his traveling companions' horse Scooter, a two-time Steer Wrestling Horse of the Year. Scooter is owned by fellow wrestlers Kyle Irwin and Tyler Pearson.

==== NFR ====
This year was the third NFR where Erickson entered ranked No. 1 in the world standings. It was his sixth consecutive NFR qualification. He earned $146,080 in the regular season. He had a lead of $41,500 over second place wrestler Hunter Cure who had earned $104,567. In 2018, Erickson placed 7th in the world standings, but surpassed $1 million in career earnings. His career earnings were now $1,147,167 for his first eight years in the PRCA circuit.

Erickson dropped out of first place in the world standings after several rounds of the NFR. By round nine, he was almost out of chances to turn things around. He showed up in Round 9 with a 3.60-second run that won the round. It was his first round win of this NFR. The gold buckle was now attainable, depending on how he performed in the last round, Round 10. At this point, his total earnings were $211,264 with second place J. D. Struxness at $190,136.

In Round 10, Erickson did not manage to finish in the money. However, he had won enough money to win the world championship nonetheless. He held off rival Bridger Chambers, who took second place. Erickson finished with $234,491, which was $17,129 over Chambers. Erickson finished 5th place in the NFR Average with 62.7 seconds total on 10 head.

Thus, Erickson won the PRCA steer wrestling world title. "It makes the all-night drives, all the time on the road, the hours in the practice pen, all the tears, worth it", he said. The past few years he had ridden his friends' horse Scooter. This year, he had ridden his own horse, Crush, an 8-year-old black gelding. Crush's steer wrestling experience was limited to March through December of this year. His wife and father-in-law helped get the horse ready. Erickson placed in three rounds. His year-end earnings were $234,491, which included his NFR earnings of just over $88,000. He placed 5th in the NFR Average; his total time was 62.7 seconds on ten head.

=== Season 2020 ===
Erickson had a slow season after his champion year by staying local while competing on his permit. He Won the Montana Pro Rodeo Circuit Finals in Great Falls, Montana.

=== Season 2021 ===
In this season, Erickson won the C. M. Russell Stampede in Stanford, Montana, and the Washington State Fair Pro Rodeo in Puyallup, Washington. He was co-champion at the Old Fort Days rodeo in Fort Smith, Arkansas, and was the co-champion of the War Bonnet Round Up in Idaho Falls, Idaho.

== Award winning horse ==
Erickson owned a steer wrestling horse with Mary Kyler of Kyler Ranch of Cascade, Montana, nicknamed Shake Em, registered name KR Montana Shake EM. He was a bay gelding. In 2017, Shake Em was 14 years old. He was awarded the AQHA/PRCA Steer Wrestling Horse of the Year Award that year.

For the past few years, Erickson rode an award-winning horse named Scooter after the loss of Shake Em. Scooter is owned by his traveling partners Ty Pearson and Kyle Irwin. In 2020, he rode Crush, his own horse. Crush is a black gelding. He has only been a steer wrestling horse since March 2021. The horse took to it well.

== Awards ==
- 2008–2009 National High School Rodeo Association All-Around Champion
- 2010 National Intercollegiate Rodeo Association Big Sky Region Steer Wrestling Champion
- 2011 PRCA Steer Wrestling Rookie of the Year
- 2016, 2019 The American Rodeo Steer Wrestling Champion
- 2017 most money won in a single PRCA season (before NFR) by a steer wrestler, $163,152
- 2019 PRCA Steer Wrestling World Champion

== Personal life ==
Erickson started dating his fiancée, Cierra Kunesh, just after college. They were married on October 20, 2018, and currently reside in Helena, Montana. They own a horse training and selling facility. They have one daughter. Erickson does ranch work at home. His two favorite rodeos are the Last Chance Stampede in Helena, and The American Rodeo in Arlington, Texas.
