= Randy Bernard =

American businessman

Bernard at the Indianapolis Motor Speedway in May 2011.

Randy Bernard (born January 31, 1967) is the former CEO of the Professional Bull Riders, IndyCar, and Rural Media Group. He is also the founder of RFD-TV's The American. He is currently the co-manager of Garth Brooks and chairman of the Academy of Country Music.

== Professional Bull Riders ==
Bernard previously served as the CEO of the Professional Bull Riders, serving from 1995 to 2010. He sold it in 2007, stayed for three more years, then opted out of his contract's fourth year of his contract to run IndyCar.

== IndyCar ==
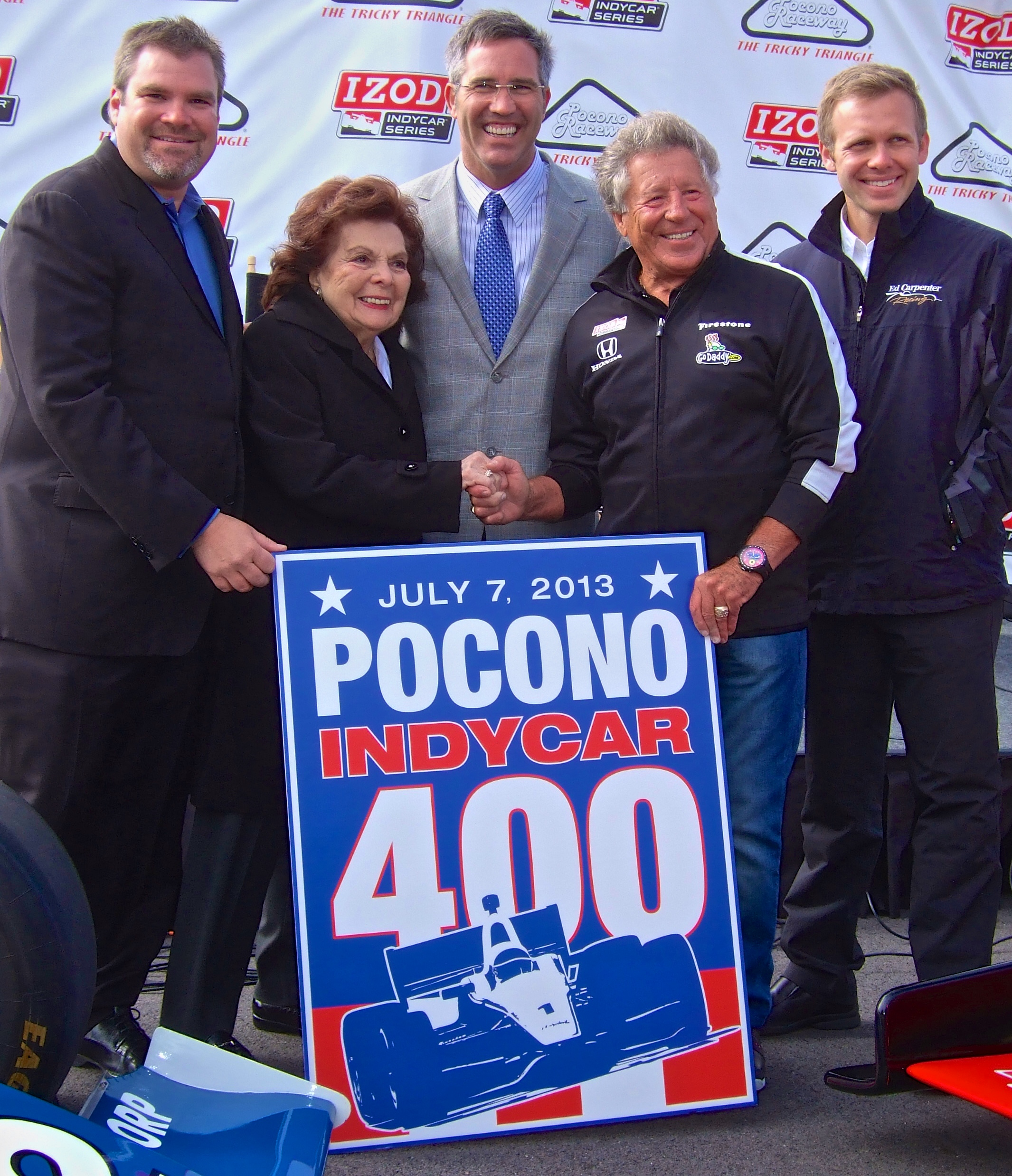
Pocono Raceway and IndyCar announce the return of the "Tricky Triangle" to the IndyCar schedule starting in 2013. This was Randy Bernard's last public appearance as IndyCar's CEO. He was terminated 27 days later.

Bernard assumed the role as IndyCar's CEO in March 2010, replacing series founder Tony George. From the start, he said he would increase the sport's visibility among general audiences, expand the schedule to important markets for advertisers and create a 50/50 split between oval and road racing.

Bernard planned a return for IndyCar to Las Vegas Motor Speedway for the 2011 season, only to have the race end in tragedy. He was able to secure a return to Fontana in 2012 and Pocono for 2013. Under his tenure, the series retired the name "Indy Racing League" and starting in 2011, it was rebranded "IndyCar". He also oversaw the ICONIC Project, which selected a new engine and chassis package for the 2012 season. It led to the return of Chevrolet and manufacturer competition to IndyCar.

On October 28, 2012, the Indianapolis Motor Speedway board of directors announced that Bernard would step down.

== Rural Media Group ==
Bernard became CEO of Rural Media Group in December 2012. While there, his biggest accomplishment was creating RFD-TV's The American, the world's richest one-day rodeo. Bernard left Rural Media Group in July 2014. He then became the manager to Garth Brooks.

== Future Farmers of America ==
Bernard sat on the Sponsors Board of the National FFA Organization in 2014.

== Honors ==
In 2010, Bernard was inducted into the PBR Ring of Honor. In 2014, he was inducted into the National Cowboy & Western Heritage Museum's Rodeo Hall of Fame.
