= Lisa Lockhart =

American barrel racer (born 1965)

Lisa Lockhart (née Schillinger; born November 11, 1965) is an American professional rodeo cowgirl who specializes in barrel racing. In 2006, 2008, 2012, and 2013, she won the Canadian barrel racing championship at the Canadian Finals Rodeo (CFR). In 2014, 2016, and 2023, she won the Average at the National Finals Rodeo (NFR).

== Life ==
Lockhart was born on November 11, 1965, in Wolf Point, Montana. She started riding at six years old with a pony. Her two sisters were key in drawing her into competition. Lockhart graduated from Montana State University. She then turned her amateur career into a professional one.

== Career ==
Lockhart joined the Women's Professional Rodeo Association (WPRA) in 1993. In addition to being a three-time NFR Average Champion, she has the second most qualifications to the NFR with 18, with Charmayne James and Sherry Cervi tied for first with 19 each. She is in 8th place for most money won at an NFR with $151,731 in 2016. For WPRA Career Earnings Leaders through 2018, she is second only to Sherry Cervi with $2,425,713. She is also a three-time winner of The American Rodeo.

Lockhart is in the top four fastest NFR Average times ever recorded to date as follows:

- 2017 137.32 seconds Nellie Miller
- 2016 137.98 seconds Lisa Lockhart
- 2015 140.41 seconds Callie duPerier
- 2014 144.93 seconds Lisa Lockhart

Lockhart won the Guy Weadick Award from the Calgary Stampede in 2016.

=== 2019 season ===
Lockhart qualified for the NFR in the 2019 season. Her season earnings are $146,352. She finished 3rd in the World Rankings. Her career earnings to date are $2,572,065.

Highlights from this season include winning the following rodeos: the Tri-State Rodeo in Fort Madison, Iowa; the McCone County Fair PRCA Rodeo in Circle, Montana; the BHSU Rally Rode and Bullfights in Spearfish, South Dakota; the Killdeer PRCA Rodeo in Killdeer, North Dakota; the Calgary Stampede in Calgary, Alberta.

=== 2018 season summary ===
In the 2018 season, Lockhart placed No. 4 in the World Standings. Her total year earnings were $123.515. Her back number was 39. Her NFR qualifications were 12 (2007–2018). To date, Lockhart's total career earnings are $2,378,482.

=== Horses ===
Her prominent horse is named "An Oakie With Cash", nicknamed Louie out of Biebers Oakie by Lady Kaweah Cash. Louie is a 23-year-old buckskin (horse) gelding as of 2026.

- In 2011, Louie was voted the Horse with the Most Heart award (presented in memory of Rockem Sockem Go “Rocky” owned by Kelly Kaminski)
- In 2019, Louie tied for third for the AQHA/WPRA Horse of the Year

Louie retired from rodeo competition in 2020 after amassing close to $2 million in career earnings.

Another of her horses is nicknamed "Rosa" out of Corona Cartel by Dash Ta Vanila. She is an 11-year-old buckskin mare as of 2021. She owns one other horse registered name Prime Diamond, nicknamed Cutter. He is a 10-year-old black gelding by Prime Talent, out of Hugos Diamond.

== Career summary ==
Lockhart has qualified for the NFR 19 consecutive times (2007–2025). She won the NFR Barrel Racing Average three times in 2014, 2016, and 2023. She won the only Elite Rodeo Athletes (ERA) barrel racing title in 2016. She won The American Rodeo three times in 2014, 2015, and 2023. She won the National Circuit Finals Rodeo (NCFR) in 2019. She has over $3 million in WPRA career earnings. She has finished in the top five in the World Standings every year for the last several years. She was the Canadian Professional Rodeo Association (CPRA) Barrel Racing Champion for 2006 with $54,412, 2008 with $58,598, 2012 with $66,268, and 2013 with $88,649.

== Personal ==
In 1994, Lockhart married her husband Grady, a professional tie-down roper. They have three children. Lockhart spends her time off riding young horses and spending time with her children. She and her family reside in Oelrichs, South Dakota, a small town of 126 at the 2010 census.

Lockhart is the aunt of 2017 and 2019 Professional Bull Riders World Champion Jess Lockwood.
