= Sherry Cervi =

American barrel racer (b. 1975)

- Occupation: Rodeo competitor
- Discipline: Barrel racing
- Born: September 17, 1975 (age 50); Tucson, Arizona, US
- Major wins/Championships: 1995, 1999, 2010, 2013 WPRA barrel racing world championships

Honors
- 2018 National Cowgirl Museum and Hall of Fame

Significant horses
- Tinman, Hawk, Troubles, Dinero, and Stingray

Sherry Cervi (née Potter; born September 17, 1975) is an American professional rodeo cowgirl who has won four world championships in barrel racing. She won the barrel racing title at the National Finals Rodeo (NFR) in 1995, 1999, 2010, and 2013. She was inducted into the National Cowgirl Museum and Hall of Fame in 2018.

== Early life ==
Sherry Cervi was born on September 17, 1975, in Tucson, Arizona. She is the younger daughter of Mel and Wendy Potter. She was raised in Marana, Arizona. Her parents were both members of the Professional Rodeo Cowboys Association (PRCA), and encouraged Cervi and her older sister Jo Lynn to learn to ride. Cervi began competing in local rodeos at age six.

Cervi continued to compete in rodeo as she grew up, and in high school she also played on the basketball team. Her height – 70 inches (1.8 m) – worked to her advantage. She was named an all-conference pick.

After graduating from Marana High School, Cervi enrolled at Central Arizona College. During her freshman year, she competed on the school's rodeo team. The following year, she left the college team and joined the Women's Professional Rodeo Association (WPRA) as a barrel racer. She continued to take classes towards a degree.

== Career ==
Professional rodeo participants who compete in the PRCA travel to dozens of rodeos each year. The top 15 competitors qualify for the annual NFR. However, barrel racers are ranked by the amount of money they win at rodeos sanctioned by the WPRA. The top money earners in barrel racing in the WPRA are invited to the NFR.

In 1994, her second year as a professional, Cervi qualified for the NFR. She finished in second place.

The following year, Cervi qualified for the NFR as not only the top seed in barrel racing, but with the top earnings during the season of any of the 120 contestants. This allowed her to wear the "Number 1" back tag, making her the second woman in NFR history, after Charmayne James, to do so. She won her first world title. The same year, she married Mike Cervi, a rodeo stock contractor.

Cervi won her second world title in 1999. In 2001, Cervi's husband was killed when the private plane in which he was a passenger crashed.

In conjunction with the 2002 Winter Olympics in Salt Lake City, a three-day Olympic Command Performance Rodeo was hosted to showcase Western culture. Both the United States and Canada brought five competitors in each event. The winners would receive both prize money and medals. Cervi was one of the United States representatives.

Cervi won her third world title in 2010.

Cervi remarried in 2013, to Cory Petska, a top team-roping competitor in the PRCA. That same year, a woman named Susan Rowan was convicted of impersonating Cervi from 2008–2010. The woman defrauded several companies and attempted to meet men.

During the 2013 season, Cervi competed at more than 45 rodeos, including a win at Cheyenne Frontier Days. In one three-week span, she won almost $70,000. At the 2013 NFR, Cervi placed in the top six in each of the ten rounds. She was only the fifth barrel racer to do so in NFR history. She earned more money at the NFR than any other competitor. Her combined time of 138.15 seconds broke the record set by Jill Moody in 2010. Cervi was named world champion and aggregate champion. Her earnings of $155,899 at the NFR were the most of any female competitor, earning her the Top Gun Award. This win was one of 12 championships she won that year. Her excellent 2013 season helped her reach a rare $2 million in lifetime earnings, the most of any barrel racer.

In early 2015, a group of elite rodeo competitors, including Cervi, formed the Elite Rodeo Athletes, a for-profit organization collectively owned by its competitors. They planned to compete against each other at several rodeos around the country, culminating in a world championship at the end of their season. The Professional Rodeo Cowboys Association, which runs the men's events at the NFR, promptly changed its bylaws to prohibit their contestants from having an ownership interest in another rodeo association. Barrel racers were not affected, as the WPRA did not prohibit their members from holding financial interests in other rodeo associations.

By 2016, Cervi reduced her professional rodeo involvement, competing in about one-third of the rodeos that her peers did. She hosts Sherry Cervi Youth Championships for young barrel racers, and she works in the family business, Ocean Spray Cranberries, Inc., in Wisconsin. She still qualified for the NFR, ranked 12th in the standings. In the second round, she finished in a tie for second with Lisa Lockhart, just one-hundredth of a second out of first. She earned $18,191 for the place.

== Horses ==
Cervi's important horses include the following: PC Frenchmans Hayday, nicknamed Dinero; Sir Double Delight nicknamed Troubles; Tinman; Jet Royal Speed, nicknamed Hawk; and MP Meter My Hay, nicknamed Stingray.

== Honors ==
In 2018, the National Cowgirl Museum and Hall of Fame inducted Cervi. In 2022, Arizona journalist David Leighton honored Cervi by naming two streets for her, in her hometown of Marana, Arizona, Sherry Cervi Way and Barrel Racer Road. These may be the only street names in the United States named in honor of a barrel racer.

== Bibliography ==
- 2021 WPRA NFR Media Guide | Barrel Racing World Champions 1948 - 2020. Women's Professional Rodeo Association.
