= Kaycee Feild =

American bareback rider (b. 1987)

Kaycee Feild (born March 4, 1987) is an American former professional rodeo cowboy who specialized in bareback bronc riding and competed in the Professional Rodeo Cowboys Association (PRCA). He is a son of PRCA World Champion all-around cowboy Lewis Feild. He has won six bareback riding world championships; the most of any PRCA bareback riders. He won them from 2011 to 2014, and again from 2020 to 2021. He is the first cowboy to win three consecutive bareback riding average titles at the National Finals Rodeo (NFR).

In July 2024, Feild was inducted into the ProRodeo Hall of Fame.

== Early life ==
Kaycee Feild was born on March 4, 1987, in Payson, Utah. He is the son of Lewis Feild, who was the world all-around rodeo champion three years in a row in the 1980s. As a child, Feild and his brother, Shadrach, often traveled with their father as he rode the rodeo circuit.

At age 13, Kaycee began practicing riding bareback broncs. His goal was to become the best bareback rider in the world. He was a scrawny child, however. His father was afraid he would be hurt, and refused to allow him to practice or compete regularly until he turned 17. The limited opportunities to practice whetted Feild's appetite. He said that "starting at that age made me want to do it more and crave it more. It made me put my mind to it instead of getting out there and just doing it."

Kaycee attended Utah Valley State, where his father was the rodeo coach. Kaycee won the National Intercollegiate Rodeo Association bareback title in 2008.

== Career ==
Feild qualified for the National Finals Rodeo (NFR) for the first time in 2008, and then again in 2009 and 2010.

For several years, beginning in 2009, Feild volunteered with the Wrangler National Patriot Program and had traveled to the Middle East to visit American troops over the Memorial Day holiday. In his first five years with the program, Feild visited forward operating bases in more than 10 countries. He credits the visits with keeping him grounded and helping him to focus more on his goals.

During the 2011 season, Feild earned $319,986, a record for members of the Professional Rodeo Cowboys Association (PRCA). That season marked his fourth appearance at the NFR as a bareback rider. He won six rounds of the bareback competition, setting a record for most round wins at the NFR. He won the PRCA bareback riding title, the world title, and the RAM Top Gun award.

At the 2012 National Finals Rodeo, Feild again won the bareback riding average title and the world championship, beating Will Lowe. He ended the season with $276,850 in winnings. According to Feild, the second championship was more difficult to win than the first. "I don't know why, but I found that to be true. To come here and stay on top the whole time in Vegas and stay strong was tough. Bareback riding is simple. It's just having the right mindset.

In 2013, Feild and fellow Utahn rodeo cowboy, bull rider Wesley Silcox began working with Cowboy Outfitters USA to offer free rodeo camps to teenagers interested in improving their bull and bronc riding skills. Feild completed the 2013 season with $239,465, enough to make him the world champion bareback rider. He also won the aggregate title at the NFR, with a combined score of 823. This win made him the first cowboy to win three consecutive aggregate titles, and the first bareback rider to win three consecutive world titles since 1975.

Feild again clinched the world title as a bareback rider in 2014, edging out Austin Foss. He was only the second man to win four consecutive world championships at the NFR, after Leo Camarillo, a team roper header who won from 1968 through 1971.

Feild competed at the NFR again in 2015. He won or placed second in five of the first nine rounds. Going into the tenth and final round, Feild had a lead of $34,000 on each of his competitors, but was second in the average standings, behind Steven Peebles. He drew Times Up for the last round. His score of 77 placed him outside the money-earning top six. Peebles won the bareback world title and Feild came in second.

In 2015, Feild joined 54 other elite rodeo competitors to launch the Elite Rodeo Athletes (ERA). Their goal was to create a professional rodeo circuit, similar to the Professional Bull Riders (PBR), to allow the top rodeo performers to compete at a limited number of events per year. Feild explained that he joined the ERA because of its larger payouts. On the PRCA circuit, Feild had to compete in between 70-90 rodeos per year to make what he described as "a living - but not a great living". As part of the ERA, he expected to earn more money than that competing in fewer than half the number of rodeos annually, potentially allowing him to stay healthier and extend his rodeo career.

In response, the PRCA changed its bylaws, prohibiting their members from owning shares in the ERA. The ERA sued. In 2016, the PRCA won the lawsuit. Feild, along with other world champions such as Lowe and Trevor Brazile were denied PRCA membership, prohibiting them from competing at PRCA rodeos and rendering them ineligible for the National Finals Rodeo in 2016.

The ERA went out of business after only one competitive season, and Feild returned to compete in the PRCA.

On February 25, 2018, the annual RFD-TV's The American was held again in the AT&T Stadium in Arlington, Texas. Feild rode C5 Rodeo Company's Virgil, the reining Bareback Horse of the Year. Feild and Orin Larsen tied in the first round of the short-go with a score of 88.25. In the second round, Feild posted the highest score of 90.75, Larsen posted 88.50, and Steven Dent posted 85.00. Feild won $100,000 for his bareback win and a share of the $1 million side-pot as a qualifier, equal to $433,333.33. Feild's ride of 90.75 points brought him the big prize. He shared the prize with Cort Scheer, who won saddle bronc riding and Matt Reeves, who won steer wrestling.

Feild won The American again in 2020.

At the NFR held in Arlington, Texas, Feild competed again in December 2020. On December 20, in Round 10, Feild got a reride decision on his first horse. All the cowboys had to wait for the end of the round and Field's reride for the winner of the round and the championship. Feild delivered a 91-point ride on Junior Bonner to win the round and the championship, his fifth world championship.

At the 2021 NFR in Las Vegas, Feild won his sixth PRCA bareback riding world championship, breaking the previous record of five held by Joe Alexander and Bruce Ford. He also won second in the bareback riding average and won the Ram Top Gun Award.

Feild won The American for the third and final time in 2023.

Feild qualified for the NFR a total of 13 times (2008 through 2015 and 2018 through 2022). In 2023, he missed qualifying for the NFR; finishing 16th in the PRCA world standings.

In November 2023, Feild announced his retirement from professional bareback riding at the age of 36.

== Personal life ==
Feild married his wife Stephanie on July 31, 2012. They have a daughter born April 2, 2013, and a son born November 2, 2015.
