= Logue Brook Dam =

Dam in Western Australia

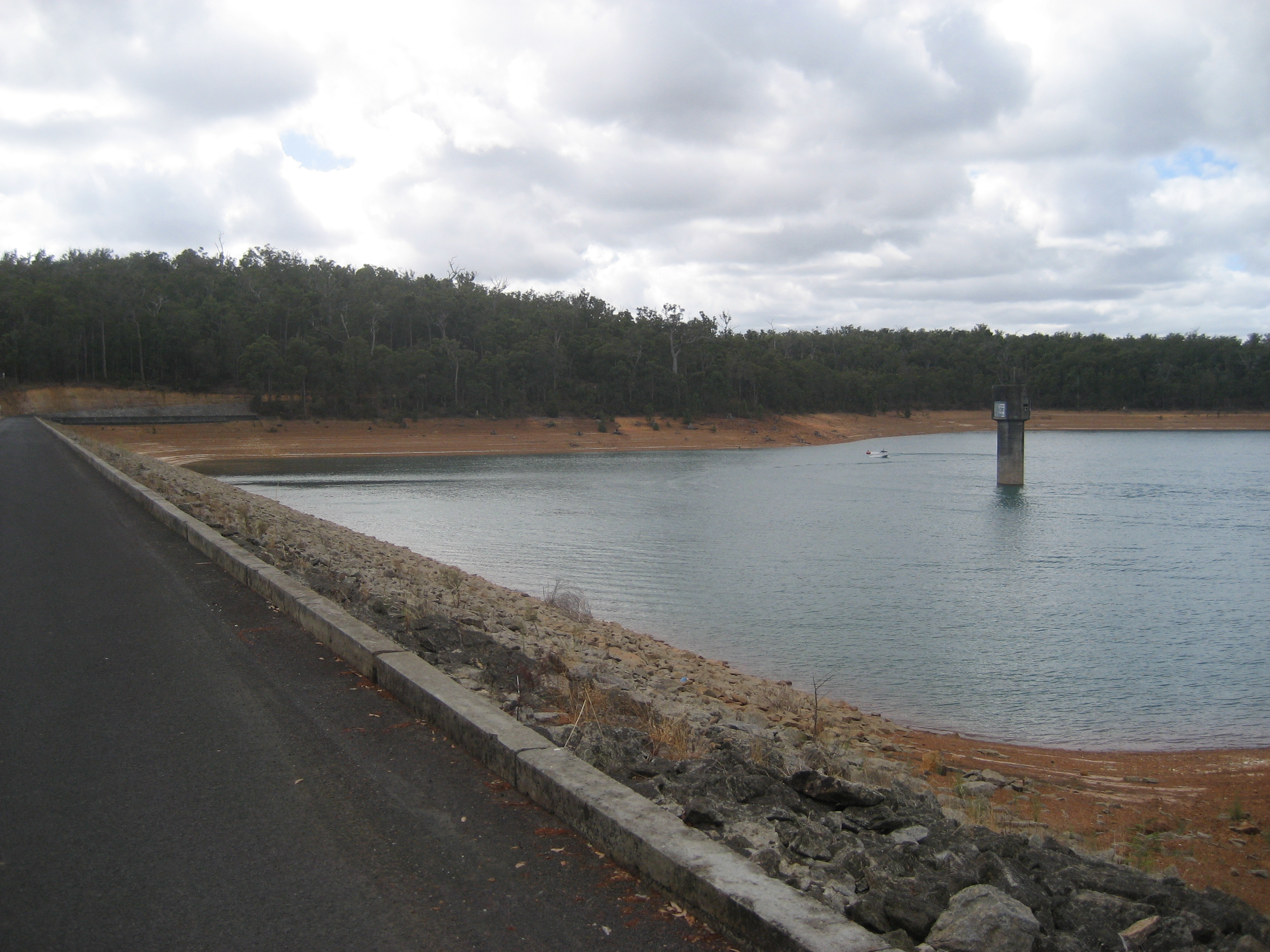
- Lake Brockman in March 2009
- Interactive map of Logue Brook Dam
- Country: Australia
- Location: Hoffman, Shire of Harvey, Western Australia
- Coordinates: 33°0′7″S 115°57′47″E

Western Australia Heritage Register
- Official name: Logue Brook Dam
- Type: Shire of Harvey Municipal Inventory
- Designated: 17 December 2012
- Reference no.: 11988

The Logue Brook Dam is a dam located in the south-west of Western Australia in the Darling Scarp near the town of Yarloop. The impoundment, a reservoir, is known as Lake Brockman.

It was opened by the Minister for Works and Water Supplies, G.P. Wild on 8 November 1963.

== Recreation ==
The dam was built to supply water for the South-West Irrigation Scheme and therefore recreational use has been permitted.

In November 2007 the Premier Alan Carpenter closed the dam for such use to enable the water to become part of the state's Integrated Water Supply by 2010. Lake Kepwari near Collie was developed as an alternative nearby water recreation facility. The decision was reversed by Premier Colin Barnett in December 2008 and the dam has since reverted to recreational use allowed. The dam is no longer considered as a potential source of drinking water.

Camping facilities are available at the damsite. Recreational water skiing and fishing is also currently permitted.

Logue Brook Dam has been used for many years by recreational scuba divers. In previous years, when the dam was close to full capacity (during winter) divers were able to descend to a maximum depth of 42 metres (138 ft). Many divers used the still waters of the dam as a training ground for deep dives. The underwater visibility ranges from about 5–8 metres (16–26 ft). Divers are advised to surface swim out to and descend the "Tower", which is located about 100 metres (330 ft) east of the main wall of the dam, where boating is prohibited.

The dam is on the Shire of Harvey's heritage list, having been registered on 17 December 2012.
