= Nellie Miller =

American barrel racer

- Occupation: Rodeo competitor
- Discipline: Barrel racing
- Born: February 14, 1988 (age 38); Cottonwood, California, US
- Major wins/Championships: 2017 WPRA barrel racing world championship

Significant horses
- Rafter W Minnie Reba "Sister"

Nellie Miller (born February 14, 1988) is an American professional rodeo cowgirl who specializes in barrel racing. She won the Women's Professional Rodeo Association (WPRA) barrel racing world championship at the National Finals Rodeo (NFR) in Las Vegas, Nevada, in December 2017. Her horse, Sister, also won the AQHA/WPRA Barrel Racing Horse of the Year that season.

== Life ==
Nellie Miller was born Nellie Williams on February 14, 1988, in Cottonwood, California. Her father Sam trains all of her horses. He first trained a horse named Blue Duck. Blue Duck was initially Sam's roping horse but became Williams' barrel riding horse. Sister, Nellie's current horse was also trained by the family. She was named Sister due to being Blue Duck's half-sister. Nellie was 12 years old when she started barrel racing. Sam taught her all about horse riding. She competed on the National Intercollegiate Rodeo Association.

== Career ==
Miller turned professional in barrel racing by joining the Women's Professional Rodeo Association (WPRA) in 2008. She competed in barrel riding sanctioned by the Professional Rodeo Cowboys Association (PRCA) each year and qualified for the NFR four times. She won the World Barrel Racing Championship at the NFR in 2017. She also won many rodeos during the regular seasons of the years 2010 through 2019, including major rodeos such as Cheyenne Frontier Days in Cheyenne, Wyoming, and RodeoHouston in Houston, Texas.

== Season 2019 ==
Miller came into the NFR this year in the number one position, which was her first time to do so. Some highlights from this season: Miller came in second place in the standings for the California Circuit. She was co-champion at Cheyenne Frontier Days. She was the co-champion at the Stonyford Rodeo in California. She won the Santa Maria Elks Rodeo in California. She won the Stampede Days Rodeo in Bakersfield, California. She won the Red Bluff Round-Up in California, which is her hometown rodeo. She won the Helzapoppin in Buckeye, Arizona. She won RodeoHouston for the second time in a row.

=== Summary ===
Miller qualified for the NFR four times, in 2010, 2017, 2018, and 2019. She finished 5th in the 2019 World Standings with $235,898.96 in total yearly earnings. Her career earnings as of 2019 are $876,021.

== Horse ==
Miller's horse, registered name Rafter W Minnie Reba, nicknamed Sister, was named the AQHA/WPRA Barrel Racing Horse of the Year in 2017. She was also named the Horse with the Most Heart that same year. Sister is a blue roan Quarter Horse mare. Sister is by KS Cash N Fame out of Espuela Roan, a daughter of Blue Light Ike.

== Personal ==
Nellie Williams met James Miller in Las Vegas, Nevada. They got married in Las Vegas. They have two daughters. Her favorite rodeo is the California Rodeo Salinas.
