= Acacia recurvata =

Conservation status
- Endangered (EPBC Act)

Scientific classification
- Kingdom: Plantae
- Clade: Tracheophytes
- Clade: Angiosperms
- Clade: Eudicots
- Clade: Rosids
- Order: Fabales
- Family: Fabaceae
- Subfamily: Caesalpinioideae
- Clade: Mimosoid clade
- Genus: Acacia
- Species: A. recurvata

Binomial name
- Acacia recurvata R.S.Cowan & Maslin
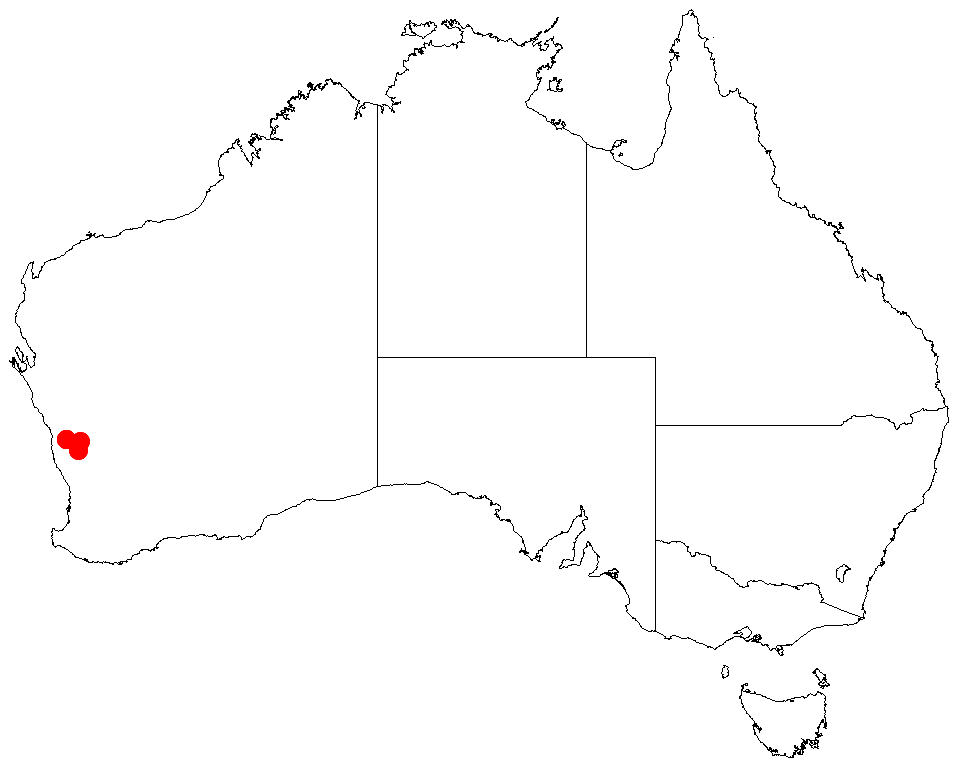
- Occurrence data from AVH

Species of legume

Acacia recurvata, commonly known as the recurved wattle, is a shrub of the genus Acacia and the subgenus Plurinerves that is endemic to a small area of western Australia.

== Description ==
The dense domed shrub typically grows to a height of 0.6 to 2.5 metres (2 to 8 ft) with branchlets that are glabrous or sparsely covered in yellow hairs that are quite resinous when immature and have stipules that are 0.5 to 1.5 mm (0.020 to 0.059 in) in length. Like most species of Acacia it has phyllodes rather than true leaves. The dull grey-green to dark green phyllodes have an inequilaterally narrow-elliptic shape and are curved with a length of 2.5 to 4 cm (0.98 to 1.57 in) and a width of 4 to 8 mm (0.16 to 0.31 in) and have five to ten longitudinal and resinous nerves. It blooms in July and produces yellow flowers. The simple inflorescences have spherical flower-heads with a diameter of 4 to 5 mm (0.16 to 0.20 in) containing 18 to25 golden coloured flowers. Following flowering thinly leathery to crustaceous seed pods form that are linear with a length of up to 6 cm (2.4 in) and a width of 2 to 3 mm (0.079 to 0.118 in). The dark brown seeds inside have an obloid shape and are 3 to 4 mm (0.12 to 0.16 in) in length.

== Distribution ==
It is native to a small area in the Mid West region of Western Australia where it is commonly situated on breakaways, low hills and plains and along creeks growing in sandy-clay or clay-loam soils based on granite. The limited range of the plant extends from around Coorow in the south to around Three Springs in the north usually as a part of shrubland or open Eucalyptus wandoo woodland communities.

== See also ==
- List of Acacia species
