= Acacia verricula =

Scientific classification
- Kingdom: Plantae
- Clade: Tracheophytes
- Clade: Angiosperms
- Clade: Eudicots
- Clade: Rosids
- Order: Fabales
- Family: Fabaceae
- Subfamily: Caesalpinioideae
- Clade: Mimosoid clade
- Genus: Acacia
- Species: A. verricula

Binomial name
- Acacia verricula R.S.Cowan & Maslin
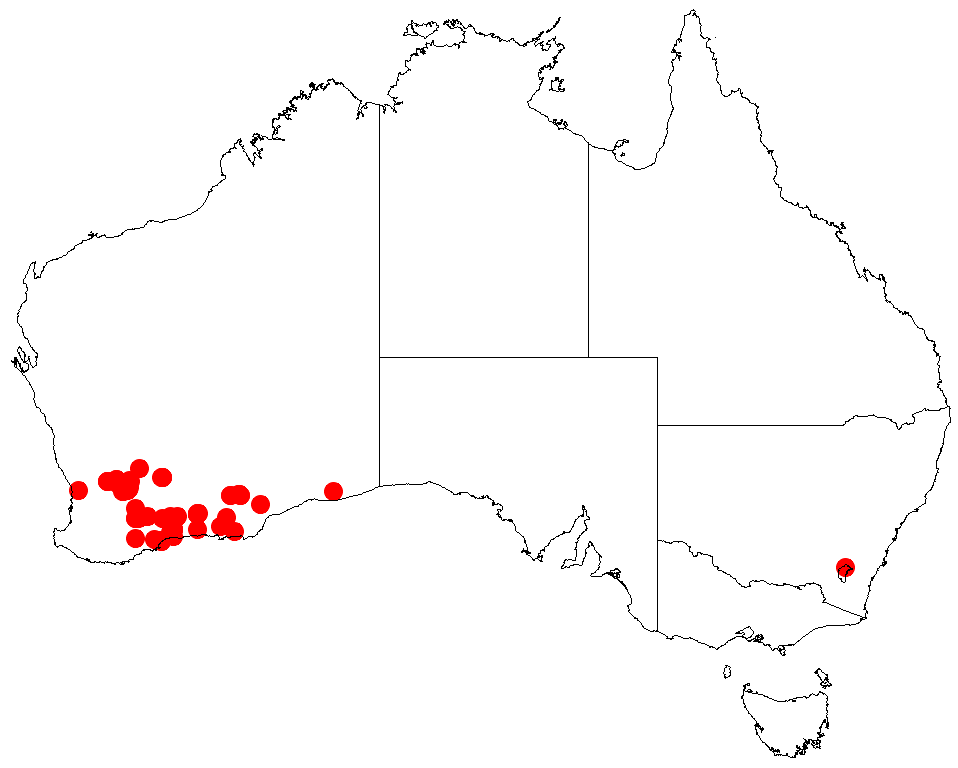
- Occurrence data from AVH

Species of legume

Acacia kalgoorliensis is a shrub of the genus Acacia and the subgenus Plurinerves that is endemic to an area of south western Australia.

== Description ==
The shrub typically grows to a height of 0.5 to 3 m (1 ft 8 in to 9 ft 10 in) and has a spreading habit with hairy resinous branchlets. Like most species of Acacia it has phyllodes rather than true leaves. The glabrous to sparsely hairy and thin leathery phyllodes have an inequilateral, narrow to linear-elliptic to oblanceolate shape and are straight to shallowly curved and have two or three main nerves that are sometimes evident. The inflorescences occur on one to two headed racemes with a length if 1 to 6 mm (0.039 to 0.236 in) and have spherical flower-heads with a diameter of 4 to 5 mm (0.16 to 0.20 in) and containing 25 to 35 golden coloured flowers. The glabrous, resinous and glossy seed pods that form after flowering are mostly undulate and bow-shaped with a length of up to 5 cm (2.0 in) and a width of 2 to 4 mm (0.079 to 0.157 in) with longitudinally arranged seeds inside. The glossy brown seeds have an elliptic shape with a length of 3 to 3.5 mm (0.12 to 0.14 in).

== Distribution ==
It has a scattered distribution along the south coast and island areas of Western Australia in the southern Wheatbelt, Great Southern and southern Goldfields-Esperance regions. The range of the species is from around Trayning and Chiddarcooping Hill in the north to the Fitzgerald River National Park in the south and as far east as Buningonia Spring and Sparkle Hill in the east with outlying specimens have been found as far east as Madura where it is found growing in loamy or sandy or clay soils that can be quite gravelly.

== See also ==
- List of Acacia species
