= Okta Logue =

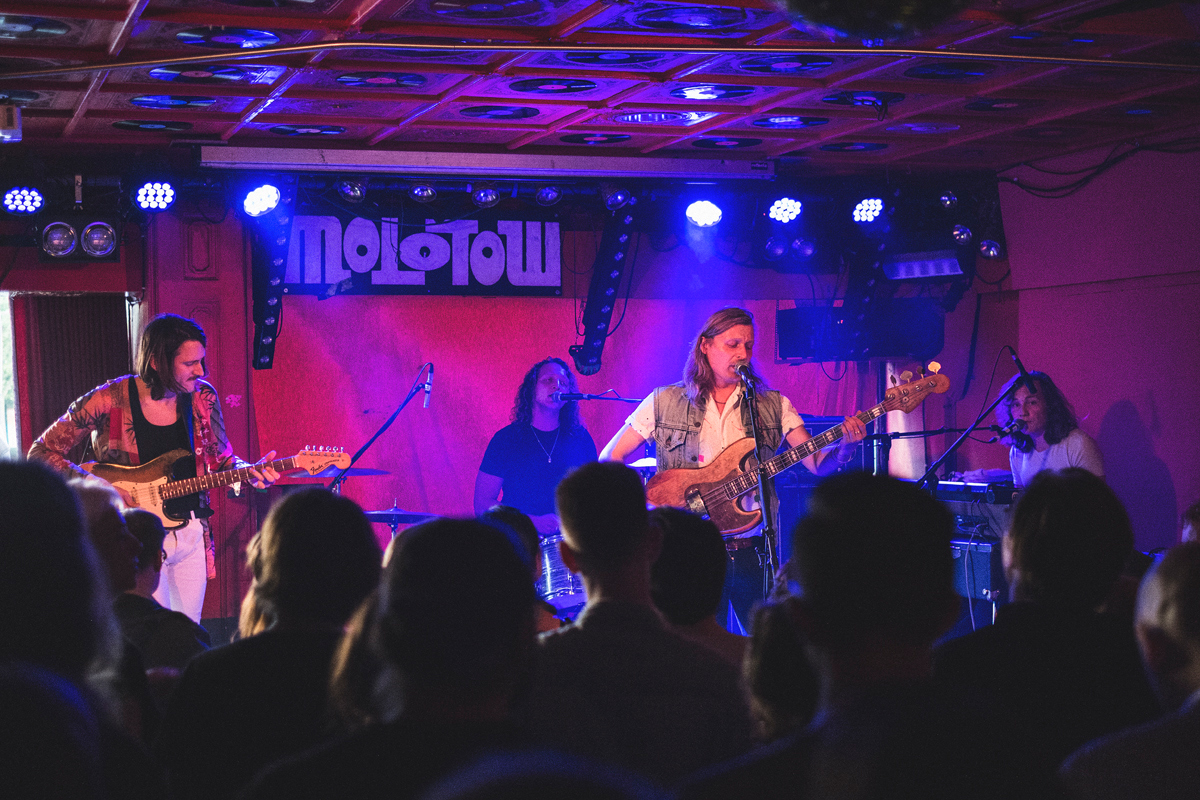
- Okta Logue

Background information
- Origin: Griesheim, Germany
- Genres: Psychedelic rock, indie-rock
- Years active: 2010–2021
- Labels: Columbia, Sony, The End Records (US only), former labels: Nasoni Records
- Members: Philip Meloi (lead guitar); Max Schneider (organ, synths); Robert Herz (dr)
- Past members: Benno Herz (voc, bass); Nicolai Hildebrandt
- Website: www.oktalogue.com

Okta Logue are a four-piece rock band based in Griesheim, Hessen Germany. The members consist of Benno Herz (bassist/vocalist), his brother Robert Herz (drums), Philip Meloi (lead guitarist), and Max Schneider (organ, synthesizers). Their style is often referred to as being influenced by '60s psychedelic rock bands mixed with modern indie rock elements.

== Biography ==
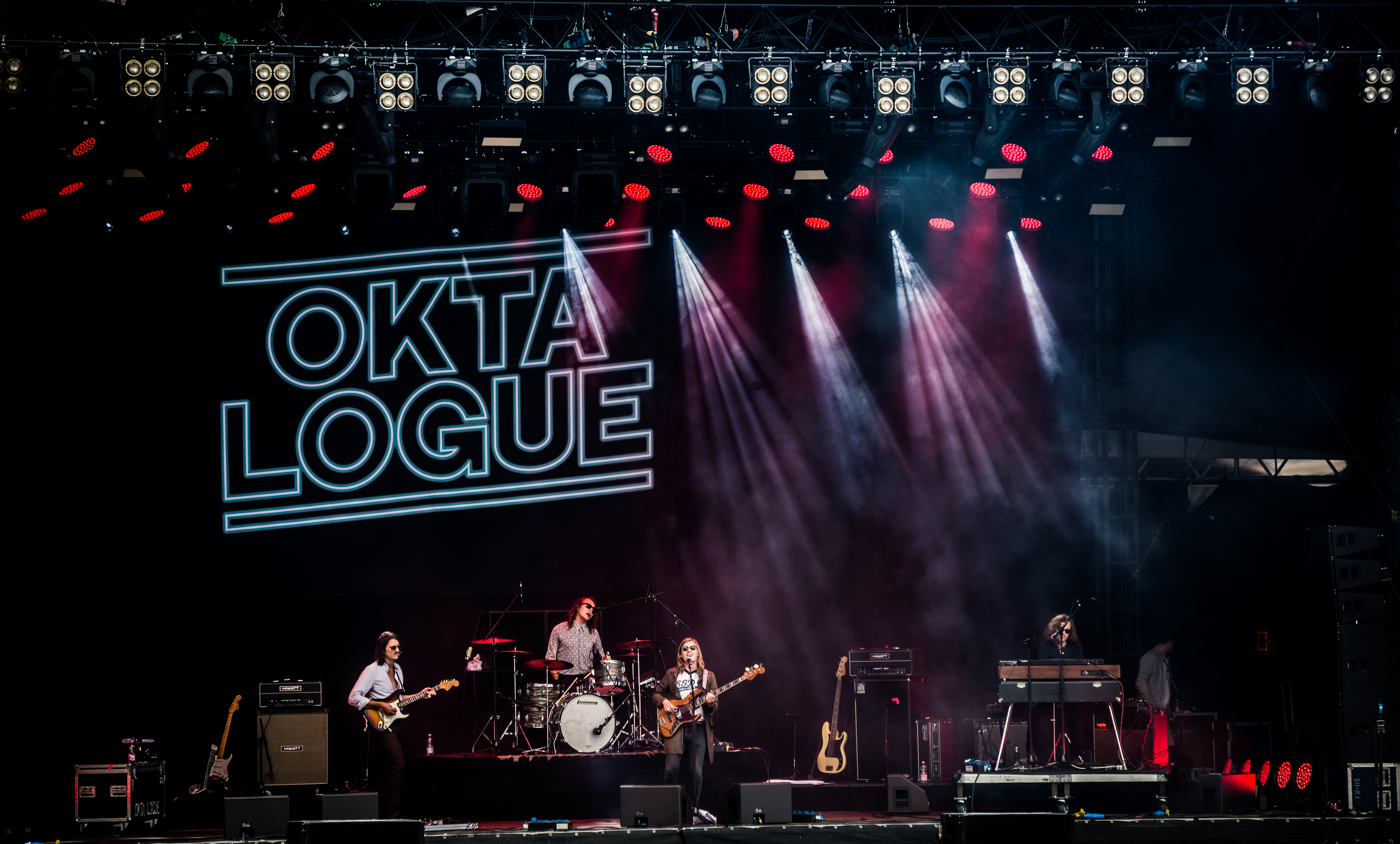
Okta Logue live at Rock am Ring 2017

Okta Logue first formed in the winter of 2007, as Zaphire Oktalogue. Benno Herz and Philip Meloi first began jamming with brother Robert Herz in their rehearsal room in Griesheim and recorded their first demo on Berlin-based independent record label Nasoni Records. While the band was officially a trio at this time, Nicolai Hildebrandt played some synthesizer parts on this first self-titled LP. Shortly thereafter, Nicolai Hildebrandt officially joined the band. Zaphire Oktalogue thus was renamed to "Okta Logue" now being a quartet. In winter, 2009, the band began writing their first official album Ballads of a Burden, which was again released on Nasoni Records. When in 2011, the band got signed to their current label Columbia / Sony Music, Ballads of a Burden was re-released on a larger scale. Their second and current album Tales of Transit City was released on Columbia / Sony Music on May 25, 2013 which was very well received among critics and brought further international attention to the band which led to an international video premiere of “Transit“ on Noisey.

Since their foundation, Okta Logue has played numerous concerts all over Europe and were invited to play support for well-known acts such as Portugal. The Man and Neil Young & Crazy Horse on their European dates in 2013. On October 1, their current album Tales of Transit City was released on New York based label The End Records for the US market. Alongside of the release in the US, the band scheduled their first US tour in October including appearances at CMJ in New York and the Culture Collide Festival in Los Angeles.

On February 11, 2016 it was announced via their Facebook Page that Nicolai Hildebrandt left the band to follow a new path. In the same post, they welcome Max Schneider as a new member of the band.

With the new formation Benno Herz, Philip Meloi, Robert Herz and Max Schneider toured a lot before they took some time off in 2018 to work on their fourth studio album called "Runway Markings", which was released on May 31 2000 via the Hamburg-based label Clouds Hill. A release tour, which was planned for February 2021, was cancelled due to CoVID-19-restrictions.

Though there was no official disbandment notice by the band, band founder Benno Herz has moved to the US and labels himself as "former singer @ octalogue" on his official Instagram profile. No band activity has been known to he public since then.

== Videos and awards ==
Apart from their musical output, Okta Logue has been especially recognised for their visual performances as well. The music video for the first single release from the album Ballads Of A Burden has received several awards, among them the prestigious first prize at the Visionale Filmfestival. For their thriller movie-like video "Transit" which was premiered internationally on Noisey, they collaborated with German film director Christoph Holsten. Other music videos, including "Judith" and "Let Go" (which was premiered on Spin.com) were again made by the band itself with keyboardist Nicolai Hildebrandt credited as screenwriter and director.

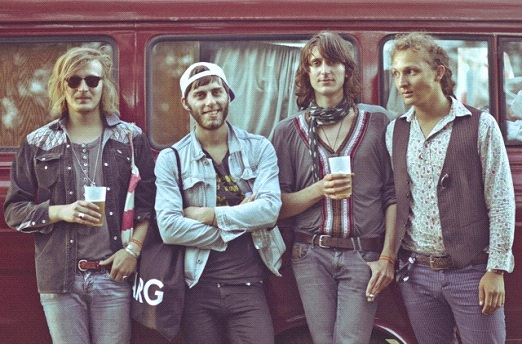
Picture of the band

== Discography ==
Title	Album details	Track listing
Ballads Of A Burden	Label: Columbia; Formats: CD: EAN 0887254055921, Vinyl EAN 0887254061519	"Bright Lights"; "Just To Hear You Sleep"; "Deal With The Digger"; "Mr. Zoot Suit"; "Shine Like Gold"; "Decay"
Transit EP	Label: Sony Music Entertainment (US exclusive digital release)	"Transit"; "Let Go"; "Bright Lights"; "Decay (Okta Logue Remix)"; "Transit" Video; "Bright Lights" Video
Tales Of Transit City	Label: Columbia / Sony; Formats: CD: EAN 0887654423924, Vinyl EAN 0888837040914; Release: 2013	"Transit"; "Mr. Busdriver"; "Dream On"; "Let Go"; "Chase The Day"; "Judith"; "Cats In The Alley"; "Just To Fall Asleep"; "You"
Diamonds And Despair	Label: Virgin Records Germany / Universal Music; Formats: CD: EAN 00602547749215, Vinyl EAN 00602547749239; Release: 15 April 2016; Charts: 68 in the German Albums Top 100 Chart (April 22, 2016)	"Pitch Black Dark"; Helpless; Stars Collage; Waves; Diamonds And Despair; Heat; Under the Pale Moon; It's Been a While; One-Way Ticket to Breakdown; Wasted With You; Heroes of the Night; Distance; Summer Days; Take It All
Runway Markings	Label: Clouds Hill (Warner); Release: 31 May 2019; recorded in the analog Studio Clouds Hill Recordings	Yesterday's Ghosts; Devil's Dance; River Street; Runway Markings; Part of the Show; In Every Stream Home a Heartache; Interlude; Chocolate and Soda; The Wheel; Julie; Signals and Signs; Out of Gas
