= 2012 National Finals Rodeo =

The 2012 National Finals Rodeo were held from December 6–15, 2012, in Paradise, Nevada, with the exception of steer roping which was held in Guthrie, Oklahoma, from November 2–3, 2012. All events are sanctioned by the Professional Rodeo Cowboys Association with the exception of barrel racing which is sanctioned by the Women's Professional Rodeo Association.
