= Steven Peebles =

American rodeo cowboy (born 1989)

Steven Peebles (born May 2, 1989) is an American former professional rodeo cowboy who specialized in bareback bronc riding. He qualified for the Professional Rodeo Cowboys Association (PRCA)'s National Finals Rodeo (NFR) seven times and won the world championship in 2015, after recovering from a near-fatal injury incurred after being bucked from a horse. He has won many of the elite rodeos, including the Calgary Stampede, the San Antonio Stock Show & Rodeo, the Reno Rodeo, the Cody Stampede, and the Fort Worth Stock Show & Rodeo.

Peebles was mentored by world champion bareback rider Bobby Mote. In 2015, Peebles became a shareholder in the Elite Rodeo Athletes (ERA) tour and was then blocked from participating in future PRCA-sanctioned events, including the NFR.

After the collapse of the ERA, Peebles returned to PRCA competition.

== Early life ==
Steven Peebles was born in Salinas, California, on May 2, 1989 to Ken and Amy Peebles. He has a younger brother, David. Peebles grew up in Salinas where his uncle, former rodeo cowboy Bob Sailors, taught him the basics of bareback riding and roping. When Peebles was 14, his family moved to Redmond, Oregon. His uncle introduced him to Redmond resident Bobby Mote, a PRCA world champion bareback rider. In bareback riding, a competitor must ride a bucking horse, without a saddle, for eight seconds. If he remains on the horse for the full eight seconds, he is given a numerical score, with 100 being a perfect ride. Mote agreed to coach Peebles in return for Peebles working around Mote's ranch. Mote was impressed with Peebles riding skills. "You'd show him what to do and he would do it [....] He was always tough, a little hardheaded, and determined. Those are all attributes that it takes to be able to do this. He knew what he wanted to do early on and he put in the time and the work."

In high school, Peebles was a member of the junior varsity baseball team. During his sophomore year, he dislocated his shoulder during a game. Doctors insisted he sit out for a time to recover. Instead, Peebles entered a local rodeo and won $700. He decided that he would focus on rodeo with the goal of one day winning his own world title.

== Career ==
=== PRCA ===
After graduating high school in 2008, Peebles joined the Professional Rodeo Cowboys Association (PRCA). Cowboys are ranked by the amount of money they win at PRCA-sanctioned rodeos. The top 15 in each event are invited to the annual National Finals Rodeo (NFR). Peebles qualified for the NFR for the first time in 2009. He finished 12th in the world and was named the PRCA Bareback Riding Rookie of the Year.

By Labor Day in 2010, Peebles had earned his way to a number 11 ranking in the PRCA standing. He was also ranked 18th in the ProRodeo Tour standings. The ProRodeo Tour is a set of 22 rodeos with its own finales. At the final ProRodeo Tour stop, in Ellensburg, Washington, Peebles set the arena record for bareback riding, earning a 90 on Mad Money. He won almost $9,000 over the course of the Ellensburg rodeo, more than any of his competitors. At his second NFR, Pebles finished 13th.

During the 2011 NFR, Peebles placed in three of the first four rounds. In the next round, he broke his right leg and tore ligaments in his right ankle, forcing him to withdraw from the competition.

Peebles finished the 2012 NFR ranked 10th in the world.

For much of the first half of 2013, Peebles was recovering from hip surgery, leaving him unable to ride. He spent his enforced break studying footage of championship rides. He returned to competition in mid-June

At the 2013 NFR, Peebles won rounds two and three. He narrowly missed winning the world title, finishing second to Kaycee Feild in both the aggregate and the world championship.

Peebles' brother, David, joined the PRCA as a bareback rider in 2014. The brothers spent part of the season traveling together.

In February 2014, Peebles won the San Antonio Stock Show & Rodeo in San Antonio, Texas. He went on to place first at the Wrangler Champions Challenge Rodeo in Rapid City, South Dakota, the Clark County Fair and Rodeo in Logandale, Nevada, the Fort Worth Stock Show & Rodeo, and the Central Point Wild Rouge Pro Rodeo in Oregon. Two days before he competed at the Cody Stampede in Cody, Wyoming, Peebles was kicked by a horse, leaving him with a "left eye nearly swollen shut." A few days later he won a round of the Calgary Stampede with an 87.5 point ride on Ragged Ann. He finished second overall at the Stampede, for the third time. He went on to win the RAM Columbia River Circuit Finals. At that event, his intermittent back pain returned. Peebles attributed it to his "right hip get[ting] out of line and pinch[ing] some nerves."

Peebles entered the 2014 NFR second in the rankings, behind defending world champion Feild. For the second year in a row, Peebles won the second round of the NFR, this time with an 85-point ride on Right Spur. The win brought him to within $45,500 of Feild's total, giving him an outside shot to win the title. In the third round of the event, Peebles was injured when the horse bucked in the chute. This caused a compression fracture in his back, forcing him to withdraw from the competition and ending his hopes of displacing Feild. Although one doctor told Peebles he'd be lucky to walk again, Peebles recovered.

The 2015 season began well. On June 26, Peebles won the Reno Rodeo for the first time, with an 83-point ride on Peppy Bound. By the end of June, Peebles was ranked 9th in the bareback riding standings. On July 2, 2015, he competed at a rodeo in Livingston, Montana. He won with an 86-point ride, but just after the buzzer he lost his hold and was bucked from the horse, landing flat on his back in the dirt. The fall broke several ribs, one of which sliced an artery. Blood began pooling in his chest cavity, slowly causing his lungs to collapse. Peebles was able to walk away unassisted, although in a great deal of pain.

After the rodeo ended, Peebles' traveling partner, fellow bareback rider Brian Bain, insisted that Peebles go to the hospital. The two argued; Peebles was convinced his broken ribs could wait until they arrived in Billings, Montana, 100 miles (160 km) away. He did not want his friend would miss his flight and be unable to compete in a rodeo the following day. Bain drove directly to the hospital, saving Peebles' life. Doctors in Livingston diagnosed the nicked artery and promptly put Peebles in an ambulance to Bozeman, Montana, which had a larger hospital with more specialized doctors. They were unsure that Peebles would survive the ambulance ride. A doctor in Bozeman was able to repair the injury, later telling Peebles it was a miracle that he had survived. Peebles spent nine of the next 14 days in the hospital.

Doctors urged Peebles to allow three months to heal before getting on another bucking horse. Six weeks after the injury, however, Peebles had slipped to number 22 in the rankings, which put his chances of qualifying for the December NFR in jeopardy. Over the protests of his family, Peebles returned to competition. He placed second in his first rodeo post-injury, scoring 85 points at the Omak Stampede rodeo. He rode in five rodeos per week to try to earn enough money to regain his place in the standings. Peebles said that during this time, "I was weak and I could barely breathe[....] There were a few rides where I was about to faint, and I'd have guys helping me get all my stuff off when I got off. But I just kept fighting through it, because I wanted to make national finals." By September, Peebles was once again ranked in the top 15.

At the 2015 NFR, his seventh consecutive time to compete for the title, Peebles won or tied for first in three of the first four rounds, moving him from 14th in the standings to 2nd, behind Feild. At the end of nine rounds, Peebles held the lead in the average standings but trailed Feild in earnings. The winner was decided in the tenth and final round. Peebles tied for first in that round, earning an 83.5 on Good Time Charlie. Feild earned only 77 points, finishing out of the money. This was enough for Peebles to win both the world championship and the aggregate, breaking Feild's string of consecutive championships. Peebles earned a total of $234,054 at the NFR, the most of any contestant. This was also the final time Peebles qualified for the NFR.

Peebles broke his back for the second time when he was a passenger in a car that flipped, in February 2016. This time he suffered an injury to the 10th thoracic vertebrae and also injured his shoulder. He spent six months recovering. According to Peebles, "It was the longest break I've ever had and I was going crazy at home." He returned to competition at the Calgary Stampede. There, he qualified for the finals by earning a score of 90 on Wild and Blue. In the finals, his score of 87.5 (on Shadow Warrior) tied for first with Caleb Benett. To determine the winner, both were forced to reride. Peebles won the $100,000 purse with an 83-point ride on Wildwood Flower.

=== ERA ===
In 2015, a group of elite rodeo cowboys formed the Elite Rodeo Athletes (ERA), a professional rodeo tour with its own world championship. Peebles, along with his mentor Mote and almost 80 other athletes, became a shareholder in the new association. The ERA was designed to offer a limited number of rodeos with higher payouts than PRCA rodeos usually offered. The PRCA quickly enacted a new bylaw prohibiting ERA shareholders from participating in PRCA-sanctioned rodeos, including the NFR, beginning in 2016.

The ERA's inaugural season, in 2016, consisted of five rodeos. Three other scheduled events were cancelled due to poor sales. Peebles qualified for its first and only championship event.

Peebles has since retired from bareback riding.

In August 2025, Peebles suffered from a severe case of acute pancreatitis and was in ICU care for several days, but eventually recovered.

== Honors ==
In 2026, Peebles was inducted into the Ellensburg Rodeo Hall of Fame.
