= Lake Kepwari =

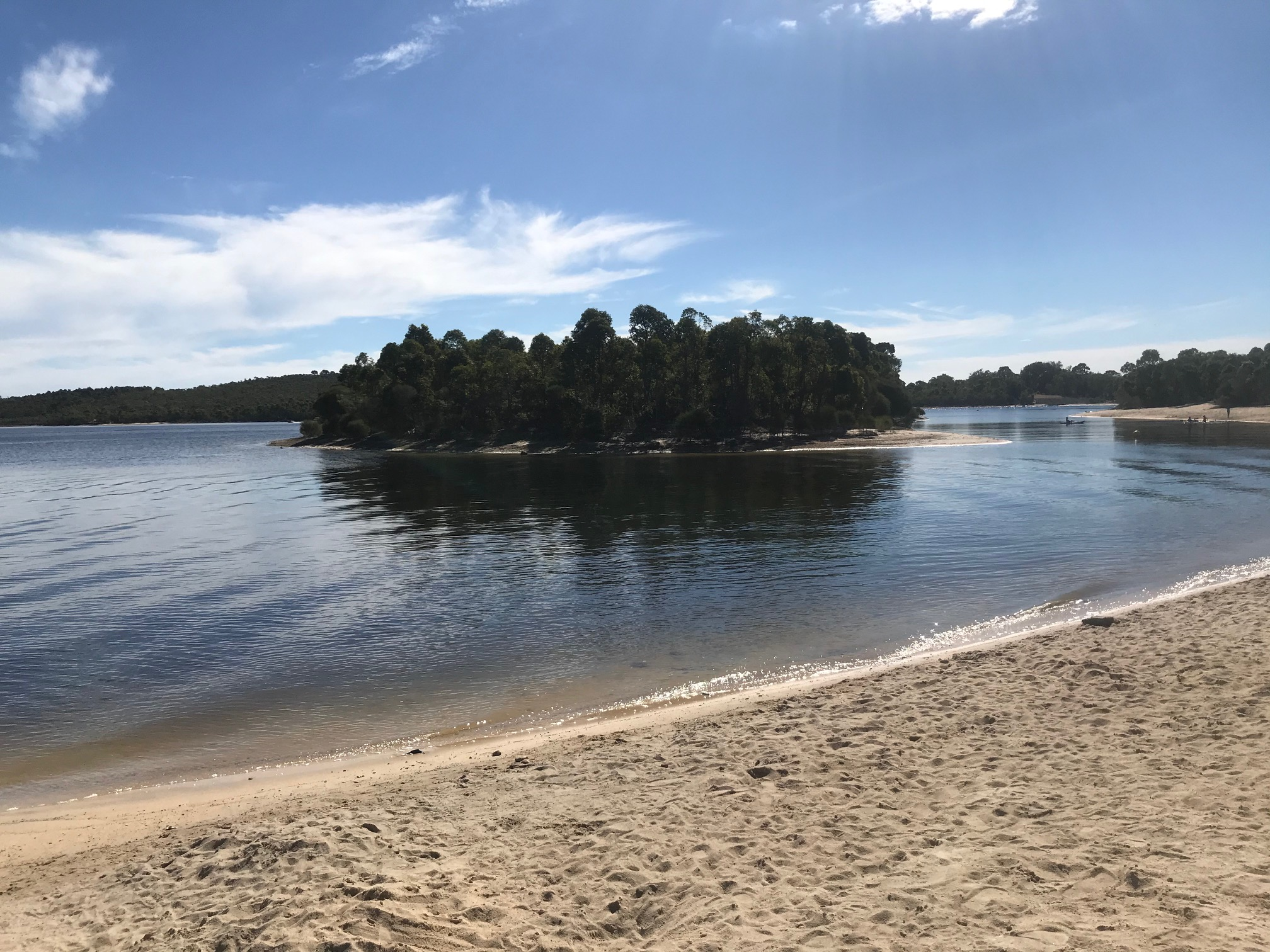
- Island in Lake Kepwari near boat ramp 2021

- Location within Western Australia
- Location: South West, Western Australia
- Coordinates: 33°27.650′S 116°13.742′E
- Lake type: Reservoir
- Basin countries: Australia
- Max. length: 2 km (1.2 mi)
- Max. width: 1 km (0.62 mi)
- Surface area: 1.03 km^{2} (0.40 sq mi)
- Max. depth: 70 m (230 ft)
- Water volume: 30×10^{6} m^{3} (24,000 acre⋅ft)

Lake Kepwari is a man-made reservoir located in Cardiff, in the South-West region of Western Australia, about 10 kilometres (6.2 mi) south-east of Collie. "Kepwari" is a Noongar word meaning "playing in water".

== Description ==
The lake is a former open-cut coal mine formerly known as Western Five, part of a mining lease operated by Wesfarmers Premier Coal from 1970 until 1996. It is 2 kilometres (1.2 mi) long, 1 kilometre (0.62 mi) wide and up to 70 metres (230 ft) deep. It covers 103 hectares (250 acres) and holds about 30 gigalitres (1.1×10^{9} cu ft) of water.

Since 2003, rehabilitation work on the site has been undertaken to develop it as a community aquatic recreation facility. It has taken about five years to fill with water from Collie River South. In 2008, the state government allocated A$3.29 million for the recreational development of the site.

Its opening has been delayed, however, due to public safety concerns about the low pH levels (pH 4.5) in the water. The acidity is believed to be due to ground water leakage at its deeper points. The ground water contains high levels of iron which oxidises and causes acidity levels to rise.

In 2009, the government called for submissions for an environmental impact assessment relating to the effects of reconnecting Collie River South to the lake, which is intended to create a flushing effect. The river is upstream from Wellington Dam and was diverted around the southern edge of the site throughout the mining operations.

It was officially opened in December 2020 by Premier Mark McGowan. The A$5.2 million campground and boating facilities were described as part of a larger A$23.3 million investment in infrastructure in the area to make it a tourism hub.

== Facilities ==
The lake has a boat ramp and parking for trailers along the shoreline. Water skiing is permitted in the lake along kayaking and swimming. Shelters and gas barbeques are also found near the boat ramp. Fishing is permitted in the lake and redfin perch and marron are both commonly caught. There are some campsites in the area, but booking is required.
