= The American Rodeo =

Event in Texas

- Genre: Rodeo
- Date: Winter/Spring
- Frequency: Annual
- Locations: Arlington, Texas, United States; AT&T Stadium (2014–2022); Globe Life Field (2023–present)
- Years active: 12
- Inaugurated: 2014
- Website: americanrodeo.com

The American Rodeo, or simply The American, is an annual rodeo held since 2014 in Arlington, Texas.

The event features the eight standard events in professional rodeo. It accepts competitors from across the world who partake in qualifier events. Both amateur competitors and professionals may qualify in the competition, which begins with preliminary rounds in the winter. The top contestants then proceed to the three Regional Semifinals (East Finals in Lexington, Kentucky; Central Finals in Oklahoma City, Oklahoma; and West Finals in Las Vegas, Nevada) in the spring, and eventually the championship event in Arlington, also in the spring. The champions of each event at The American win a trophy belt buckle, trophy saddle, and a minimum of $100,000. In 2022, the total purse surpassed $3 million.

== History ==
The American premiered in 2014 as the brainchild of Randy Bernard, the then-CEO of Rural Media Group. He had previously served as the CEO of the Professional Bull Riders (PBR) from 1995 to 2010 and IndyCar from 2010 to 2012.

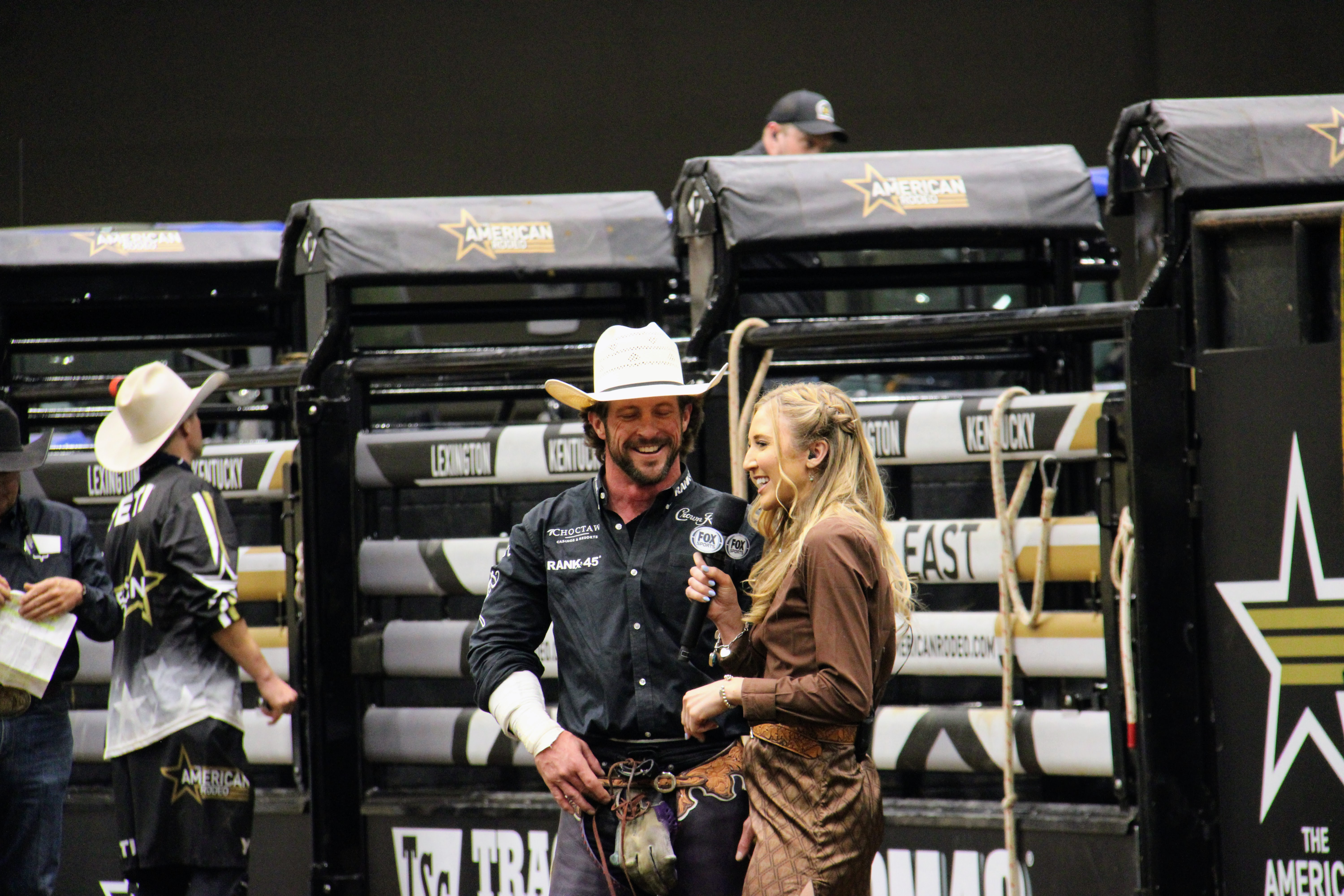
A winner at the 2026 American Rodeo East Regional, which took place April 10–11 in Lexington, Kentucky, at Alltech Arena on the grounds of the Kentucky Horse Park.

From 2014 to 2018, The American was held as an unsanctioned event. Between 2019 and 2021, it was sanctioned by the Professional Rodeo Cowboys Association (PRCA), and contestants’ earnings counted toward National Finals Rodeo (NFR) qualifications if they were PRCA members. In 2022, however, The American returned to being unsanctioned.

From 2014 through 2021 the American was televised live on RFD-TV and was known as RFD-TV's The American during that time. In 2022 and 2023, it was televised live on INSP. Since 2024, it has been televised live on Fox.

From 2014 through 2022, the American was held at AT&T Stadium. Since 2023, it has been held at Globe Life Field.

Teton Ridge Inc. acquired The American in 2021, following it with the purchase of Rural Media Group's Western sports division (The Cowboy Channel and related networks) in 2024.

== Events ==
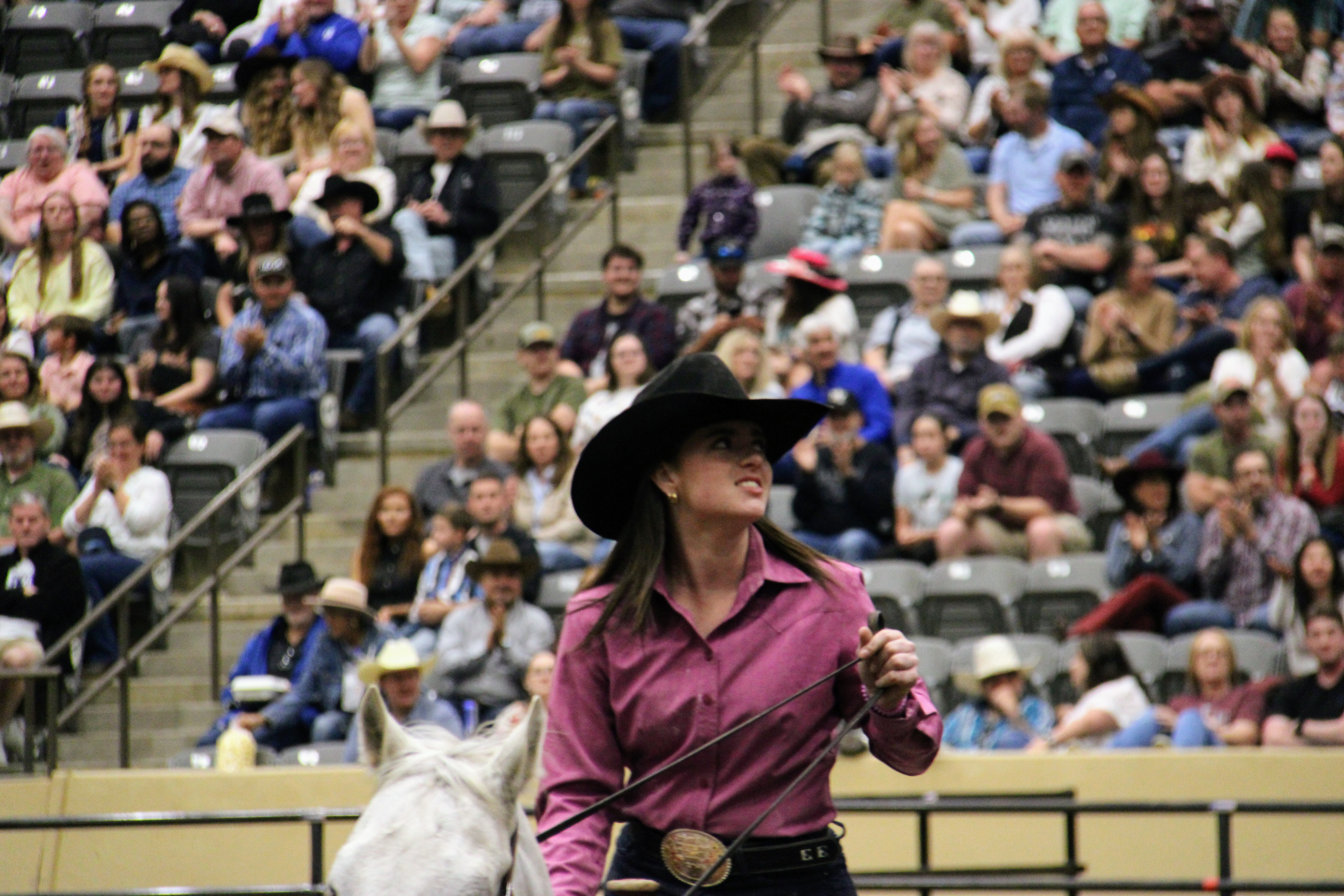
A winning breakaway roper at the 2026 American Rodeo East Regional, which took place April 10–11 in Lexington, Kentucky, at Alltech Arena on the grounds of the Kentucky Horse Park.

- Bareback riding
- Breakaway roping
- Steer wrestling
- Team roping
- Saddle bronc riding
- Tie-down roping
- Barrel racing
- Bull riding

== Notable winners ==
Notable winners have included:

- Trevor Brazile - 2014, 2016
- Richie Champion - 2014
- Ty Erickson - 2016, 2019
- Kaycee Feild - 2018, 2020, 2023
- Sage Kimzey - 2017, 2020
- Hailey Kinsel - 2017, 2019, 2021
- Lisa Lockhart - 2014, 2015, 2023
- Jess Lockwood - 2018
- J.B. Mauney - 2014
- João Ricardo Vieira - 2016, 2019, 2020
