= List of Canadian Pro Rodeo Hall of Fame inductees =

This List of Canadian Pro Rodeo Hall of Fame Inductees was created by the Canadian Professional Rodeo Association (CPRA) for the Canadian Pro Rodeo Hall of Fame to recognize extraordinary athletes, both human and animal, in the sport of rodeo. It was founded in 1979 to honor and distinguish these individuals as well as the builders in the Canadian rodeo arena. The Canadian Rodeo Historical Association qualifies the inductees. The Canadian Pro Rodeo Hall of Fame is located at the Calnash Trucking Ag Event Centre in Ponoka, Alberta. Many artifacts from the varied history of rodeo are on display there.

== Inductees ==
Rodeo Athletes Pro Rodeo Hall of Fame inductees Source:
| Year | Name | Type | Born | Death | Ref(s) |
|---|---|---|---|---|---|
| 1981 | Pete Knight | Contestant | May 5, 1903 | May 23, 1937 | |
| 1982 | Guy Weadick | First Builder inducted | 1885 | December 13, 1953 | |
| 1982 | Ray Knight | Contestant, Builder | April 8, 1872 | February 7, 1947 | |
| 1982 | Herman Linder | Contestant | 1910 | | |
| 1982 | Carl Olson | Contestant | 1914 | | |
| 1983 | Warren Cooper | Builder | 1902 | | |
| 1983 | Tom Threepersons | Contestant | 1886 | August 13, 1949 | |
| 1983 | Norman Edge | Contestant | 1904 | | |
| 1983 | Clarence Gingrich | Builder | 1905 | | |
| 1983 | Frank Sharp | Contestant | January 26, 1900 | | |
| 1984 | Tom Dorchester | Contestant | May 31, 1911 | | |
| 1984 | Dick Cosgrave | Builder | January 24, 1905 | January 18, 1973 | |
| 1984 | A.K. (Art) Lund | Contestant | April 7, 1903 | | |
| 1984 | Don Thomson | Contestant | 1911 | | |
| 1984 | Slim Watrin | Contestant | February 24, 1901 | | |
| 1984 | Earl Bascom | Contestant and Builder | June 19, 1906 | | |
| 1984 | Jack Wade | Contestant | June 6, 1910 | | |
| 1984 | Lloyd Myers | Builder | 1895 | | |
| 1985 | Tom Lauder | Contestant | 1888 | 1974 | |
| 1985 | Fred Kennedy | Builder | 1900 | | |
| 1985 | Clem Gardner | Contestant | 1963 | | |
| 1985 | Bill Mounkes | Contestant | February 22, 1909 | | |
| 1985 | Harry Knight | Contestant and Builder | September 19, 1907 | | |
| 1985 | Ken Thomson | Contestant and Builder | September 13, 1914 | | |
| 1986 | Pat Burton | Contestant | 1907 | 1977 | |
| 1986 | Cliff Vandegrift | Contestant and Builder | December 10, 1912 | March 17, 1991 | |
| 1986 | Gib Porter | Builder | 1906 | | |
| 1986 | Lorne Thompson | Contestant and Builder | September 13, 1906 | | |
| 1986 | Urban Doan | Contestant | September 23, 1906 | August 12, 1965 | |
| 1986 | Albert Galameau | Contestant | | | |
| 1986 | Sykes Robinson | Contestant | June 27, 1904 | January 10, 1978 | |
| 1987 | Carl (Slim) Dorin | Contestant and Builder | 1913 | | |
| 1987 | Hughie Long | Contestant | May 12, 1907 | | |
| 1987 | Joe Fisher | Contestant | September 28, 1902 | | |
| 1987 | Jerry Myers | Contestant | June 30, 1916 | | |
| 1987 | Jim Maxwell | Builder | July 19, 1904 | | |
| 1987 | Frank Duce | Contestant | 1919 | | |
| 1988 | Jerry Ambler | Contestant | May 19, 1911 | 1958 | |
| 1988 | Harold Mandeville | Contestant | July 7, 1925 | | |
| 1988 | Bob Duce | Contestant | July 22, 1929 | October 31, 1966 | |
| 1989 | Jack Dillon | Builder | 1883 | March 15, 1948 | |
| 1989 | Reg Kesler | Contestant and Builder | October 16, 1919 | May 16, 2001 | |
| 1990 | Wally Lindstrom | Contestant | 1915 | | |
| 1990 | Cam Lansdell | Contestant | March 26, 1922 | 2016 | |
| 1990 | Clark Lund | Contestant | August 24, 1905 | 1983 | |
| 1991 | Pete Lagrandeur | Contestant | April 1, 1890 | July 1, 1957 | |
| 1992 | Harry Vold | Builder | 1924 | March 13, 2017 | |
| 1992 | John Glazier | Builder | January 6, 1917 | April 8, 1987 | |
| 1992 | Fred Gladstone | Contestant | April 3, 1918 | | |
| 1993 | Ronnie Glass | Contestant | December 18, 1915 | September 3, 1981 | |
| 1993 | Orville Strandquist | Contestant | February 20, 1920 | January 5, 2012 | |
| 1993 | Leo Brown | Contestant | 1936 | | |
| 1993 | Kenny McLean | Contestant | | | |
| 1994 | Bob Carry | Builder | 1894 | | |
| 1994 | Marty Wood | Contestant | June 4, 1933 | | |
| 1994 | Gordon Earl | Contestant | | June 1, 1992 | |
| 1994 | Wilf Grietz | Contestant | | May 17, 1995 | |
| 1994 | Bill Collins | Contestant | | | |
| 1995 | Lawrence Bruce | Builder | June 11, 1896 | August 18, 1962 | |
| 1995 | Winston Bruce | Contestant | October 27, 1937 | July 10, 2017 | |
| 1995 | Lee Farris (Canada Kid) | Contestant | April 19, 1908 | January 18, 1943 | |
| 1995 | Gid Garstad | Contestant | September 11, 1936 | October 19, 1985 | |
| 1995 | Dale Trottier | Contestant | January 17, 1944 | | |
| 1996 | Brian Butterfield | Contestant | November 4, 1933 | | |
| 1996 | Bud Butterfield | Contestant | July 19, 1930 | | |
| 1996 | Tom Butterfield | Builder | January 27, 1928 | | |
| 1996 | Mel Hyland | Contestant | | | |
| 1997 | Bob Robinson | Contestant | September 13, 1931 | | |
| 1997 | Jerri (Duce) Phillips | Contestant | December 1951 | | |
| 1998 | Keith Hyland | Contestant and Builder | | | |
| 1998 | Mac Leask | Contestant and Builder | | 1979 | |
| 1998 | Don Perrin | Contestant and Builder | | | |
| 1998 | Len Perry | Builder | | | |
| 1998 | Bud Van Cleave | | | | |
| 1999 | John Dodds | Contestant | April 17, 1948 | April 2005 | |
| 1999 | Malcolm Jones | Contestant | | | |
| 1999 | Rocky Rockabar | Contestant | | | |
| 1999 | Peter Welsh | Builder | | July 11, 1936 | |
| 2000 | Tom Bews | Contestant | | | |
| 2000 | Jack Daines | Builder | | | |
| 2000 | Jim Gladstone | Contestant | | | |
| 2000 | Lorne Wells | Contestant | | | |
| 2001 | Robin Burwash | Contestant | | | |
| 2001 | Mel Coleman | Contestant | | | |
| 2001 | Steve Dunham | Contestant | | | |
| 2001 | Bill Kehler | Contestant | | June 16, 2003 | |
| 2001 | Dick Nash | Contestant | | June 10, 1961 | |
| 2002 | Jim Dunn | Contestant | September 17, 1955 | | |
| 2002 | Rex Logan | Builder | | May 18, 2011 | |
| 2002 | Dave Penner | Contestant | | | |
| 2002 | Greg Schlosser | Contestant | | | |
| 2003 | Don Beddoes | Builder | | | |
| 2003 | Paddy Brown | Builder | | | |
| 2003 | Brian Claypool | Contestant | | May 1979 | |
| 2003 | Tom Erikson | Contestant | | | |
| 2003 | Dwayne Erikson | Builder | | April 2013 | |
| 2003 | Lee Phillips | Contestant | | | |
| 2004 | Ryan Byrne | Builder | | | |
| 2004 | Duane Daines | Contestant | | | |
| 2004 | George Myren | Contestant | | | |
| 2004 | Alvin Owen | Contestant | | | |
| 2004 | Blaine Pederson | Contestant | | | |
| 2004 | Will Senger | Builder | | October 27, 2017 | |
| 2005 | Greg Butterfield | Contestant | | | |
| 2005 | Harley Hook | Contestant | | | |
| 2005 | Isabella Miller Haraga | Contestant | | 2007 | |
| 2005 | Frank Mickey | Builder | | | |
| 2005 | Gene Miller | Contestant | | | |
| 2005 | Cody Snyder | Contestant | | | |
| 2005 | Gordon Crowchild | Legend | | | |
| 2005 | Ivan Daines | Legend | | | |
| 2005 | Doug Vold | Legend | | | |
| 2006 | Bruce Flewelling | Builder | | April 10, 2016 | |
| 2006 | Dick Havens | Contestant | | | |
| 2006 | Wilf Hyland | Contestant | October 2, 1954 | | |
| 2006 | Emery LeGrandeur | Contestant | 1881 | 1934 | |
| 2006 | Daryl Mills | Contestant | | | |
| 2006 | Larry Robinson | Contestant | | | |
| 2006 | Doug Flanigan | Legend | | | |
| 2006 | Lynn Jensen | Legend | | December 4, 2009 | |
| 2006 | Ernie Dorin | Legend | | November 29, 2001 | |
| 2007 | Ken Bower | Contestant | June 17, 1982 | | |
| 2007 | Norman & Shirley Edge | Builders | | | |
| 2007 | Alex Laye | Contestant | | | |
| 2007 | Nathan Woldum | Contestant | March 10, 1912 | March 21, 1998 | |
| 2007 | Clark Schlosser | Legend | | | |
| 2007 | Pat McHugh | Legend | | | |
| 2007 | Maxine Girletz | Legend | | | |
| 2008 | Wayne Vold | Contestant | | | |
| 2008 | Ellis Lewis | Contestant | 1929 | | |
| 2008 | Jerry Sinclair | Contestant | | | |
| 2008 | Lawrence Hutchinson | Contestant | 1938 | | |
| 2008 | Verne Franklin | Builder | 1931 | | |
| 2008 | Dale Johansen | Contestant | | | |
| 2008 | Pete Bruised Head | Legend | | | |
| 2008 | Albert Laye | Legend | | December 4, 2016 | |
| 2008 | Dale Rose | Legend | | 2005 | |
| 2009 | Jim Clifford | Contestant | | | |
| 2009 | Don Dewar | Contestant | | 2017 | |
| 2009 | Claire & Lois Dewar | Builders | | | |
| 2009 | Jim Kelts | Contestant | | | |
| 2009 | Ruth McDougall | Contestant | | November 27, 2016 | |
| 2009 | Mark Wagner | Builder | | 2011 | |
| 2009 | Wes Zieffle | Builder | | | |
| 2009 | Dave Shields, Sr. | Legend | | | |
| 2009 | Allan Thorpe | Contestant | | | |
| 2009 | Don Edge | Legend | | April 2, 2007 | |
| 2010 | Gordon Doan | Contestant | | | |
| 2010 | Phil Doan | Contestant | | | |
| 2010 | Clayton Hines | Contestant | | | |
| 2010 | Edith Malesh | Builder | | | |
| 2010 | Floyd Peters | Contestant | | | |
| 2010 | Everett Vold | Contestant | | | |
| 2010 | Brian Whitlow | Legend | | | |
| 2010 | Darwin Lund | Legend | | | |
| 2010 | Allan Currier | Legend | | November 1, 2018 | |
| 2011 | Don Johansen | Contestant | | | |
| 2011 | Joe Lucas | Contestant | | | |
| 2011 | Ernie Marshall | Builder | | 2014 | |
| 2011 | Ralph Murray | Builder | | | |
| 2011 | Glen O'Neil | Contestant | | | |
| 2011 | Ted Yayro | Contestant | | April 2018 | |
| 2011 | Duane Bruce | Legend | | | |
| 2011 | Ted Glazier | Legend | | | |
| 2011 | Rocky Hubley | Legend | | | |
| 2012 | Roger Lacosse | Contestant | | | |
| 2012 | Harvey Northcott | Builder | | 2010 | |
| 2012 | Mark Roy | Contestant | | | |
| 2012 | Rod Warren | Contestant | | | |
| 2012 | Elaine Watt | Contestant | | | |
| 2012 | Cliff Williamson | Contestant | | | |
| 2012 | Bob Gottfiredson | Legend | | | |
| 2012 | Tom Ivins | Legend | | | |
| 2013 | Bart Brower | Legend | | | |
| 2013 | Bill Boyd | Contestant | | | |
| 2013 | Merv Churchill | Builder | | | |
| 2013 | Arnold Haraga | Contestant | | | |
| 2013 | Gina McDougall | Contestant | | | |
| 2013 | Bob Fisher | Legend | | | |
| 2013 | Kirk Thomson | Legend | | | |
| 2014 | Darrel Cholach | Contestant | 1963 | | |
| 2014 | Dave Garstad | Contestant | | | |
| 2014 | Lee Laskosky | Contestant | 1958 | | |
| 2014 | Neil McKinnon | Builder | 1926 | | |
| 2014 | Viola Thomas | Contestant | | | |
| 2014 | Bob Robertson | Legend | | | |
| 2014 | Lloyd Fowlie | Legend | | | |
| 2015 | Dee Butterfield | Contestant | | | |
| 2015 | Greg Cassidy | Contestant | | | |
| 2015 | Harris Dvorkin | Builder | | April 10, 2017 | |
| 2015 | Jim Freeman | Contestant | | | |
| 2015 | Pearl Mandeville | Builder | | | |
| 2015 | Charlie Chick | Legend | August 15, 1921 | November 2000 | |
| 2015 | Kenton Randle | Legend | 1960 | November 23, 2003 | |
| 2016 | Bob Hartell | Contestant | | | |
| 2016 | Dan Lowry | Contestant | | | |
| 2016 | Dave MacDonald | Contestant | | 2011 | |
| 2016 | Vic Stuckey, Sr. | Builder | 1914 | 1953 | |
| 2016 | Gerald "Hoover" Hays | Legend | February 12, 1956 | 2015 | |
| 2017 | Denny Hay | Contestant | | | |
| 2017 | Glen Keeley | Contestant | | March 2000 | |
| 2017 | Billy Laye | Contestant | | | |
| 2017 | Rayel Little | Contestant | | | |
| 2017 | Bill Pimm | Builder | | | |
| 2017 | Lester Gurnett | Legend | | | |
| 2018 | Wade Joyal | Contestant | | | |
| 2018 | Doug (Shakey) Russell | Builder | | | |
| 2018 | Fred Duke | Contestant | | | |
| 2018 | Blake Butterfield | Legend | | | |
| 2018 | Lyle Smith | Legend | | | |
| 2019 | Dr. Gary (Doc) Harbin | Builder | June 18, 1945 | March 9, 2019 | |
| 2019 | Bob (Flipper) Phipps | Contestant | | | |
| 2019 | Rod Hay | Contestant | | | |
| 2019 | Leon Laye | Contestant | | | |
| 2019 | Dale (Stik) Butterwick | Legend | | | |
| 2019 | Jim Lawrence | Legend | | | |
| 2019 | Darrell Paulovich | Award of Distinction | | October 12, 2018 | |
| 2020 | Todd Boggust | Contestant | | August 2001 | |
| 2020 | Robert Bowers | Contestant | | | |
| 2020 | Guy Shapka | Contestant | | | |
| 2020 | Dallas Mackie | Builder | | | |

Livestock Pro Rodeo Hall of Fame inductees Source:
| Year | Name | Category | Species | Breed | Born | Death | Ref(s) |
|---|---|---|---|---|---|---|---|
| 1981 | Midnight | Saddle Broncs | Equine | | | November 1936 | |
| 1984 | Five Minutes to Midnight | Saddle Broncs | Equine | | circa 1921 | 1945 | |
| 1988 | Wanda Dee | Saddle Broncs | Equine | | 1947 | | |
| 1989 | Three Bars | Bareback Broncs | Equine | | | | |
| 1993 | Cindy Rocket | Bareback Broncs | Equine | | 1960 | 1989 | |
| 1993 | Tiger | Bulls | Bovine | | | | |
| 1993 | Dirty Girtie | Bulls | Bovine | | | | |
| 1994 | Spud | Timed-event horses - Steer Wrestling | Equine | | | | |
| 1995 | Transport | Saddle Broncs | Equine | | | 1993 | |
| 1996 | Moonshine | Bareback Broncs | Equine | | | November 6, 1987 | |
| 1997 | Moon Rocket | Bareback Broncs | Equine | | | 1989 | |
| 1998 | Kingsway | Bareback Broncs/Saddle Broncs | Equine | | | | |
| 1999 | American Express | Saddle Broncs | Equine | | | | |
| 2000 | Sarcee Sorrel | Saddle Broncs | Equine | | | | |
| 2001 | Lonesome Me Skoal | Bareback Broncs/Saddle Broncs | Equine | | | | |
| 2001 | Wilfred | Bulls | Bovine | Angus | | | |
| 2002 | Guilty Cat | Bareback Broncs/Saddle Broncs | Equine | | 1975 | | |
| 2002 | Rambo | Bulls | Bovine | | 1990 | | |
| 2003 | High Chaparral H1 | Bareback Broncs | Equine | | 1983 | | |
| 2004 | Coyote | Bareback Broncs | Equine | | 1978 | | |
| 2005 | Stubby | Bulls | Bovine | | | | |
| 2006 | Air Wolf | Bareback Broncs/Saddle Broncs | Equine | | | | |
| 2007 | J H Necklace | Bareback Broncs | Equine | | | | |
| 2008 | Blue Bill | Saddle Broncs | Equine | | | | |
| 2009 | Twist | Timed-event horses - Steer Wrestling | Equine | | | | |
| 2010 | Wyatt Earp | Saddle Broncs | Equine | | | | |
| 2011 | Charles Manson | Bareback Broncs | Equine | | | | |
| 2012 | Grated Coconut | Bareback Broncs | Equine | | | | |
| 2013 | Fred | TD | Equine | | | | |
| 2014 | Chester Skoal Bandit | Bareback Broncs | Equine | | 1990 | | |
| 2015 | Junior | TD | Equine | | | 1996 | |
| 2016 | Confusion | Bulls | Bovine | Brahma | | | |
| 2016 | Painted Smile | Saddle Broncs | Equine | | 1993 | 2016 | |
| 2017 | Little Six | Bulls | Bovine | | | | |
| 2018 | Rodeo News | Saddle Broncs | Equine | | | | |
| 2019 | Franklin's Blue Ridge | Barebacks Broncs | Equine | | 1985 | | |
| 2020 | Willy | Timed-event horses - Steer Wrestling | Equine | | | | |

== See also ==
- Lists of rodeo performers
- Bull Riding Hall of Fame
- Professional Bull Riders
- Professional Rodeo Cowboys Association
- ProRodeo Hall of Fame
- American Bucking Bull
- International Professional Rodeo Association
- Championship Bull Riding
