= Jerri Duce =

Canadian barrel racer

- Born: 1951 (age 74–75); Claresholm, Alberta, Canada
- Other names: Jerri Duce Phillips
- Occupations: Rodeo contestant, trick rider, horse trainer
- Years active: 1960-present

Jerri Duce, also known as Jerri Duce Phillips, (born 1951) is a nine-time Canadian barrel racing champion. She was the first Canadian woman to qualify for the National Finals Rodeo (1975) in the United States and was the first woman inducted into the Canadian Pro Rodeo Hall of Fame (1997). She also performed as a trick rider and stunt rider. She was inducted into the Alberta Sports Hall of Fame in 2010 and runs a horseback riding school.

== Early life ==
Jerri Duce was born in 1951 in Claresholm, Alberta, Canada, to Rose M. (née Cisar) and Frank M. Duce. Her father was a rodeo champion, holding the Canadian title for saddle bronc riding in 1951 and 1952. Her mother was a hairdresser and seamstress, who made all of the costumes for the rest of the family in their rodeo competitions.

Along with her older brother Jack and younger sister Joy, Duce began riding at a young age. All three children participated in rodeo. When Duce was nine, her father bought a trick saddle for his daughters at their insistence. The girls began trying tricks on the saddle and then bought the book The Complete Book of Trick and Fancy Riding, which advertised "144 ways to break your neck" and gave diagrams and descriptions of various tricks. Because of his involvement in rodeo, their father knew people who could coach the girls and hired trainers for them.

== Career ==
Duce began a trick riding career with her sister, Joy, in 1960, when they were hired by a stock contractor who booked them for 50 shows. Though they lived in Granum, Alberta, eight months out of the year, the sisters traveled with their parents, performing at shows. Initially, they were called "Sister Act", but soon changed their name to "The Flying Duces". Among the tricks in their act the sisters performed the back bend, the one foot stand, the layout, the suicide drag, and the under the neck tricks. In 1972, they teamed up with J. W. Stoker, a champion trick rider and roper from Weatherford, Texas and toured throughout the U.S. as the "Ace and Two Duces" and booked shows with him through 1974.

Around 1980, Duce married Lee Phillips, a steer wrestler, who had been president of the Canadian Professional Rodeo Association (CPRA). For a time, the sisters performed with Leo Gooch before having Kelly King join their act in the mid-1980s, performing as JLK Troupe. They rode all over North America and performed abroad "in England and Scotland in 1981, Bermuda in 1988 and Japan in 1991". Their performance venues included Expo 67 and the 1988 Winter Olympics, as well as many annual shows at the Calgary Stampede. They also performed as stunt riders in films, such as Robert Altman's 1975 production, Buffalo Bill and the Indians, or Sitting Bull's History Lesson.

Duce won her first Canadian barrel racing championship in 1964, when she was 12 years old. It was the first time the championship had been won by a member of the junior division. She repeated the feat eight times, winning in 1965, 1966, 1968, 1970, 1974, 1975, 1976, 1977. Her sister finished second in the standings on five of Duce's winning years. She also holds the Canadian record for the most points won over six events, 230 points, as well as the most first place rankings over six events, with five firsts. She was the first Canadian woman to qualify for the National Finals Rodeo (NFR) and competed at the Oklahoma State Fair Grounds Arena in 1975 and 1976. Though she qualified for the National Finals Rodeo in 1977, a training accident took her out of the competition.

When Duce became too old to compete in the Canadian Professional Rodeo Association, she joined the Canadian Senior Pro Rodeo Association. In 2012 and 2016, she and her partners won the Ribbon Roping Over 60 championship. In 2014, she won the Ladies Barrel Racing Over 60 championship. Also during this time, in 2012, she awarded the Pattie McPeak Award.

In 1997, Duce was inducted into the Canadian Pro Rodeo Hall of Fame, the first woman to be inducted. She began operating a trick riding school in 2003 near Carseland. She was inducted into the Alberta Sports Hall of Fame in 2010.
