= Three Bars (bucking horse) =

Rodeo horse (b. 1961)

- Discipline: Bareback bronc
- Sex: Mare
- Foaled: circa 1961
- Died: 1993
- Country: Canada
- Color: Brown
- Owner: Reg Kesler

Honors
- ProRodeo Hall of Fame; Canadian Pro Rodeo Hall of Fame

Three Bars was a Canadian rodeo bucking horse that was specialized in bareback bronc riding. She was the Bareback Horse of the National Finals Rodeo (NFR) three times in 1967, 1973, and 1980. She was inducted into the Canadian Pro Rodeo Hall of Fame of the Canadian Professional Rodeo Association (CPRA) in 1989, and the ProRodeo Hall of Fame of the Professional Rodeo Cowboys Association (PRCA) in 2004.

== Background ==
It was spring in the year 1965 when stock contract Reg Kesler from Rosemary, Alberta, bought a 4-year-old mare born c. 1961. Purchased from Bill McBeth of Lethbridge, Alberta, Three Bars was unknown to Kesler then. Nonetheless, Kesler's acquisition of the mare started a true legacy. In addition to being a champion bucking horse, she also became a top breeder.

== Career ==
Three Bars was part of stock contractor Reg Kesler's herd. His herd was pastured in Missoula, Montana, and Rosemary, Alberta. She was the most famous horse he owned. She was selected three times for the top bareback horse of the National Finals Rodeo (NFR) in 1967, 1973, and 1980. Her pedigree includes many great bucking horses. These horses also bucked at the NFR. "This horse was probably the rankest horse I was ever on," said world champion bareback rider and ProRodeo Hall of Fame inductee Bruce Ford of Kersey, Colorado. "She never had a set pattern, but she didn’t want you on her back."

In addition to her NFR awards, she also had five runner-up championships in 1966, 1967, 1970, 1972, and 1977. Additionally, she also added a third place in 1974. World champion bareback rider Joe Alexander claimed she is one of the rankest bareback horses in rodeo history.

During the years she was bucking, gaining notice, and becoming a champion, Kesler was using her to breed in his program for bucking horses. She produced 12 colts, whom most of went to success in bucking as well. There was Three Chicks, Three Knotts, Three Jangles, and best known was Three Cheers.

== Legacy ==
Three Bars was retired from competing in rodeos and breeding in 1986. She died in 1993 and was buried in the front yard of the Kesler Ranch in Rosemary, Alberta. Now, her tradition carries through her progeny. ProRodeo Hall of Fame inductee Jim Ivory said about Three Bars: "was no doubt the best, rankest bareback horse there’s ever been," Ivory said. "She could throw everybody off, and it always hurt, for some reason. There's been a lot of good ones over the years but she was unbelievable." For three decades, Three Bars bucked at the NFR. She won the Bareback Horse of the NFR three times. Ivory bucked off two times. "She almost killed me the first time," he said, "and she did the second time."
