= List of cowboys and cowgirls =

The following list of cowboys and cowgirls from the frontier era of the American Old West (circa 1830 to 1910) was compiled to show examples of the cowboy and cowgirl genre.

== Cattlemen, ranchers, and cowboys ==
- Harve Wilson (1867–1951)
- Preston Nutter (1848–1936)
- Calico Jones (1832–????)
- Wilber Emery "W.E." Campbell (1847–1907)
- John Chisum (1824–1884)
- Charles Francis Colcord (1859–1934)
- Robert Driscoll (1871–1929)
- Jesse Lincoln "J.T." Driskill (1824–1890)
- Andrew Drumm (1828–1919)
- Frank "Pistol Pete" Eaton (1860–1958)
- John King Fisher (1854–1884)
- Charles Goodnight (1836–1929)
- Montford T. Johnson (1843–1896)
- Richard King (1824–1885)
- Pete Kitchen (1822–1895)
- Raymond Knight (rodeo organizer) (1872–1947)
- George W. Littlefield (1842–1920)
- Oliver Loving (1812–1867)
- Willis McCutcheon (1836–1906)
- James Alfred McFaddin (1840–1916)
- George W. McJunkin (1851–1922)
- Robert Benjamin "Ben" Masterson (1853–1931)
- Frank H. Maynard (1853–1926)
- Colonel George Washington Miller (1841–1903)
- Zachary Taylor "Zack" Miller (1878–1952)
- Burton C. Mossman (1867–1956)
- Thomas O'Connor (1819–1887)
- William "Bill" Pickett (1870–1932)
- Abel Head "Shanghai" Pierce (1834–1900)
- Will Rogers (1879–1935)
- Theodore Roosevelt (1858–1919)
- Charles Angelo "Charlie" Siringo (1855–1928)
- John Ware (~1845–1905)
- Liam Leatherland (~1842–1859)
- Jordan "Stomach" Cooper (~1870–1904)
- Jack "Two-Shot" Lowe (1874–1892)
- Nate Champion (1857–1892)

== Wild West show and rodeo performers ==
- Earl W. Bascom (1906–1995)
- Yakima Canutt (1896–1986)
- William Frederick "Buffalo Bill" Cody (1846–1917)
- James Butler "Wild Bill" Hickok (1837–1876)
- Raymond Knight (1872–1947)
- Texas Jack Omohundro (1846–1880)
- Texas Jack, Jr. (1860–1905)
- Jack Hoxie (1885–1965)
- Gordon William "Pawnee Bill" Lillie (1860–1942)
- May Lillie, née Manning (1869–1936)
- Thomas E. "Tom" Mix (1880–1940)
- Lucille Mulhall (1885–1940)
- Annie Oakley (1860–1926)
- Will Rogers (1879–1935)
- Gabriel Dumont (1837–1906)
- Brodie "Saltmine" Peele (~1923–1974)

== Fictional ==
- Quick Gun Murugan
- Hopalong Cassidy
- Rawhide Kid
- Cisco Kid
- Lucky Luke
- Red Ryder
- Shane
- Tonto
- Zorro
- Barbarosa
- Marlboro Man
- Pecos Bill and Slue-Foot Sue
- John Marston (video game character; Red Dead Redemption)
- Arthur Morgan
- Red Harlow
- Sheriff Woody and Jessie (Toy Story, Toy Story 2, and Toy Story 3)
- Yosemite Sam (animated)
- Cole Cassidy
- SpongeBuck SquarePants (SpongeBob Episode; "Pest of the West")
- Cowboy Zombie (Plants vs. Zombies 2's Wild West)
- Hol Horse
- Sheriff Callie
- Howdy Doody

== See also ==
- List of American Old West outlaws
- List of Western lawmen
- National Cowgirl Hall of Fame Honorees
