= Earl W. Bascom =

American-Canadian painter and cowboy (1906–1995)

Earl Bascom FRSA
- Cowboy of Cowboy Artists – Father of Modern Rodeo
- Born: Earl Wesley Bascom; June 19, 1906; Vernal, Utah, U.S.
- Died: August 28, 1995 (aged 89); Victorville, California, U.S.
- Education: Brigham Young University
- Occupations: Cowboy; rodeo champion; rancher; inventor; school teacher; Western artist; international sculptor; Hollywood actor; historian; writer
- Spouse: E. Nadine Diffey (1939–1995)
- Awards: Fellow of the Royal Society of Arts

Earl Wesley Bascom FRSA (June 19, 1906 – August 28, 1995) was an American-Canadian painter, printmaker, sculptor, cowboy, rodeo performer, inventor, and Hollywood actor. Raised in Canada, he portrayed in works of fine art his own experiences of cowboying and rodeoing across the American and Canadian West. Bascom was awarded the Pioneer Award by the ProRodeo Hall of Fame in 2016 and inducted into several halls of fame including the Canadian Pro Rodeo Hall of Fame in 1984. Bascom was called the "Cowboy of Cowboy Artists," the "Dean of Rodeo Cowboy Sculpture" and the "Father of Modern Rodeo." He was a participant member of the Church of Jesus Christ of Latter-day Saints.

== Early life ==
Bascom was born on June 19, 1906, in a sod-roofed log cabin on the Bascom 101 Ranch in Vernal, Utah, United States, the son of rancher and lawman John W. Bascom and Rachel Lybbert. His father had been a Uintah County deputy sheriff and later a constable in the town of Naples in northeast Utah, who chased members of Butch Cassidy's Wild Bunch Gang and other outlaws including Harry "Mad Dog" Tracy.

Both of his grandfathers, Joel A. Bascom and C.F.B. Lybbert, were Mormon pioneers, frontier lawmen and ranchers. Joel Bascom was a member of the Nauvoo Legion (the Utah militia), serving in the Utah War of 1857 and the Utah Black Hawk War of 1865. He also served as Chief of Police in Provo, Utah, and as the first constable in Mona, Utah. Lybbert, who served in the Danish army before coming to America, was a blacksmith who served as constable of Levan, Utah, and as justice of the peace in Naples, Utah.

Members of Earl's family include his grand uncle Ephraim Roberts who was a pony express rider, and grand uncle William Lance who was a soldier in the Mormon Battalion – Army of the West 1846–1848. Another Bascom relative was Wyoming rancher and Wyoming Governor Bryant Brooks who served from 1905 to 1911. He was also related to the Army Lieutenant George Bascom who arrested Apache Chieftain Cochise in 1861 which started the Apache Wars. Three famous mountain men, Jedediah Smith, Doc Newell, and J.T. Warner, were related to Bascom.

Bascom's paternal ancestors were French Basque and Huguenot. Bascom's maternal family was of Norwegian, Danish, Dutch, and German ancestry.

In 1912, when Earl Bascom was six years old, his mother Rachel died of breast cancer, leaving five children – Raymond, Melvin, Earl, Alice, and Weldon – ranging in age from 11 years to nine months. In 1913, Earl's father, who had cowboyed in Utah and Colorado and worked on ranches in Idaho, Wyoming, and Montana, went to Alberta, Canada, securing a job as a foreman on the Knight Ranch.

In 1914, the Bascom family loaded their belongings into a covered wagon, traveled a week to the nearest railroad in Price, Utah, and rode the train to Canada. After working for the Knight Ranches headquartered on the Milk River Ridge in Alberta and managing Ray Knight's Butte Ranch north of the town of Raymond, Alberta, John W. Bascom and his sons began ranching on their own using the Bar-B-3 brand. Over the following years, the Bascom family lived at Welling Station and ranched along Pot Hole Creek, ran cattle on the open range at New Dayton on the Fort Whoop-up Trail near Deadman Coulee, and Milk River Ridge, and ranched east of Lethbridge on the Old Man River and near Stirling east of Nine Mile Lake.

By Canadian law, all minor children who immigrated to Canada before 1915 and whose parent became a naturalized citizens, automatically became Canadian citizens. Earl Bascom's father became a naturalized Canadian citizen. Earl Bascom was an American Canadian. During the winter of 1916, the Bascom family moved back to Naples, Utah, returning to Canada in the spring of 1917.

Schooled mostly in one-room schools, Bascom quit school while in grade three to work on the Hyssop 5H Ranch, east of Lethbridge. It was not long before a Canadian Mountie, who was visiting the Hyssop Ranch, thought that one of the cowboys was just too young looking to be a seasoned cowpuncher and bronc peeler. The Mountie asked Earl Bascom just how old he was – he was 13 years old. Earl was returned to school.

In 1918, Bascom gained a stepmother and a stepbrother, Frank, when his father married Ada Romeril Dawley. The couple had five children, making a total of eleven children in the Bascom family. Charles was a member of the Royal Canadian Air Force, who died a hero during the war having saved two fellow soldiers before losing his own life.

== Cowboy career ==
Bascom was known as the Cowboy of Cowboy Artists due to his wide range of western experiences as a professional bronc buster, bull rider, cowpuncher, trail driver, blacksmith, freighter, wolf hunter, wild horse chaser, rodeo champion, cattle rancher, dude wrangler, and Hollywood actor. Bascom was among the last of those who experienced the Old West before the end of free-range ranching. Bascom reminisced:

I worked for some of the big open-range outfits from Purple Springs to the Sweetgrass Hills and Kicking Horse Creek to the Milk River Ridge and the Canadian Rockies. On one roundup some 7,000 horses were gathered in one bunch a mile wide. And the Knight Ranch dipped 18,000 head of cattle. What a sight to see. The sight, the sounds, the smell I can still remember.

For Bascom, ranch life and cowboy life was his life. "The life of a cowboy and the West, I know," he stated. Bascom worked on some of the largest horse and cattle ranches in the United States and Canada – ranches that ran thousands of cattle on a million acres (4000 km^{2}) of land. He broke and trained hundreds of horses. He worked on ranches where he chased and gathered horses, cows and even donkeys in Utah, Arizona, Colorado, Idaho, Wyoming, Montana, Texas, Mississippi, Washington, California and western Canada. He worked on cattle drives out of the Rockies and horse drives through the Teton Range. He took part on large roundups of horses and cattle, and brandings. He made saddles and stirrups, quirts, chaps, spurs, bridles and bits, ropes and hackamores, and even patched his own boots. Earl's brothers and their father, John W. Bascom, were all experienced ranch hands and professional horsemen who were known as the "Bronc Bustin' Bascom Boys."

A professional rodeo cowboy, Bascom followed the rodeo circuit internationally, rodeoing from 1916 to 1940, where he won several all-around championships. He competed in the rough stock events of saddle bronc riding, bareback riding and bull riding, and in the timed events of steer decorating and steer wrestling. In 1933, he set a new arena record, a new world record time and won third place in the world standings in the steer decorating event. He also was a rodeo announcer, performed trick riding and competed in the rodeo events of wild cow milking and wild horse racing.

Bascom has been inducted into several rodeo, cowboy and sports Halls of Fame in Canada and the United States. He received international publicity for his rodeo equipment inventions and designs. Earl's brothers – Raymond "Tommy" Bascom, Melvin "High Pockets" Bascom and Weldon "Preacher" Bascom, along with their father John W. Bascom – were also professional rodeo cowboys and Hall of Fame inductees. Rodeoing financed Earl Bascom's college education at Brigham Young University where he was given the title of "Rodeo's First Collegiate Cowboy" and from which institution he graduated in 1940.

Bascom has been honored as the "Father of Modern Rodeo" and known as "rodeo's greatest innovator and inventor." He is known in rodeo history for designing and making rodeo's modern bucking chute in 1916 and modified in 1919. He also made rodeo's first hornless bronc saddle in 1922 and rodeo's first one-hand bareback rigging in 1924, for which he has been called the "Father of the Modern-day Bareback Rigging" and the "Father of Rodeo Bareback Riding." In 1926, he designed and made the modern rodeo riding chaps, and then in 1928, a rodeo exerciser made of spring steel.

Bascom was recognized by rodeo associations around the world for his rodeo inventions.

During his college years, Earl and his brother Weldon produced the first rodeos in Columbia, Mississippi, in 1935, 1936, and 1937 while working for Sam Hickman's B Bar H Ranch near Arm, Mississippi. This first rodeo in Columbia is known in cowboy history as one of the first rodeos held outdoors at night under electric lights. In March 2019 as part of the 200th year celebration of Columbia's birth, an official Mississippi State Historical Marker was erected and dedicated, honoring the "Birthplace of Mississippi Rodeo."

In 1936, under the direction of Earl Bascom, using his designs, a new rodeo arena was built which was the first permanent rodeo arena constructed in Mississippi.

The bucking horses used in the rodeo were shipped in from West Texas. Sam Hickman and Earl Bascom went to New Orleans where they purchased brahma bulls for the rodeo bucking stock. This was the first recorded use of brahma bulls in rodeo. Sam Hickman financed these rodeos through his Wild West Rodeo Company.

Between rodeos of 1936 and 1937, Earl was a missionary for the Church of Jesus Christ of Latter-day Saints in Mississippi, serving under Mission President LeGrand Richards of the Southern States Mission. The Bascom brothers were honored fifty years later for being the "Fathers of Mississippi Rodeo" and given the "Key to the City of Columbia," along with a congratulatory telegram from President Ronald Reagan. In 2016, Earl Bascom and his brother Weldon were officially recognized by the ProRodeo Hall of Fame as the "Fathers of Brahma Bull Riding."

In 1939, Bascom married Nadine Diffey. Earl and Nadine met in Mississippi while he was cowboying and rodeoing there. They were married in Salt Lake City, Utah, in the Salt Lake LDS Temple, and raised five children. Nadine Bascom was an artist of floral arrangement, painting and sculpture, creating many bas-relief sculptures.

Besides being a professional rodeo contestant, Bascom tried his hand as a rodeo clown and rodeo bullfighter during his rodeo career. Just after his 89th birthday, Earl was honored as the oldest living rodeo clown in the world.

At age 88, Bascom helped roundup longhorn steers on the Shahan Ranch in west Texas and received honors for his art during the 1994 Texas Longhorn Quincentennial Cattle Drive and Celebration. Bascom's bronze sculpture The American Longhorn, 1494–1994 was declared the most authentic example of a classical Texas longhorn steer.

In 2014, Bascom was honored posthumously during the tenth anniversary celebration of the National Day of the Cowboy, for his international contributions to cowboy culture and the cowboy way of life.

== Artist ==
=== Influences ===
While working for the Nilsson Rafter-E-N Ranch, Bascom happened to read a story in a western magazine about Native American Jim Thorpe, who had excelled in sports and became an Olympic champion. Thorpe's life touched Bascom: "I felt like I had walked in his boots," Earl said. "Like Jim Thorpe, cowboy life was the only life that I knew. But what about my art, what about art school?"

Wanting to be an artist since childhood, Bascom filled the pages of his school books in the one-room school house he attended with cowboy scenes. His desire to be a cowboy artist was greatly enhanced after seeing art works of the two great icons of Old West art, Charles M. Russell and Frederic S. Remington – both cousins to his father, John W. Bascom (Remington and Russell were both related to Bascom through their mothers, Clarissa "Clara" Bascom Sackrider Remington and Mary Elizabeth Mead Russell, respectively).

Russell was on the Knight Ranch when Bascom was working there, and had drawn a sketch on the bunkhouse wall and also finished a large oil painting of Raymond Knight on his favorite mount, Blue Bird, roping a steer.

Although Bascom was educated in one-room school houses and only completed one full school year, never finishing high school, he never lost his desire to be an artist. He subscribed to a correspondence art course wherein both Russell and Remington gave instructions on their drawing techniques. "Through those art lessons these two masters of western art were my first real art teachers," Bascom recalled. "In fact the only instructions I ever had in western art were from Remington and Russell."

Even though he had no high school diploma, the Brigham Young University in Provo, Utah, accepted him as a student in the fall of 1933. "There I was a 27 years old college freshman who hadn't been to school in years," Bascom recalled. "I felt like a wild horse in a pen." But as a BYU student, he was persistent, taking every art course the college offered. He studied painting and drawing under professors E.H. Eastmond and B.F. Larsen, and sculpture under Torleif S. Knaphus.

In the summertime between school years, Bascom was a rodeo contestant where he gained notoriety as a cowboy artist and rodeo champion. He interrupted his college education in 1934 with the intent to compete, along with his three brothers, at the World Championship Rodeo in London, England.

During his freshman year of 1933–34, Bascom won the Studio Guild Award for the best student art work of the year. He won that top art award again in 1936, as well as the Honorable Mention Award. He was a member of the BYU Art Club and the Canada Club as well as the Delta Phi fraternity. He was a popular entertainer with his cartoon drawings at the University Dames Club of which his wife Nadine was a member. He graduated from BYU with a degree in Fine Art in 1940. His fellow art students voted him "most likely to succeed" as an artist. He was a member of the Brigham Young University Alumni Association and elected to the BYU Emeritus Club in 1990.

Later he attended classes at Long Beach City College, Victor Valley College, and the University of California Riverside.

=== Employment ===
In 1917, Bascom saw his first Hollywood movie The Silent Man starring William S. Hart. Earl and his older brother Melvin were extras in a silent movie in 1920 being filmed in Lethbridge, Alberta. In 1924, a team of palomino horses from the Bascom Ranch was used by Hoot Gibson in a Roman race in the movie The Calgary Stampede. Earl later worked in the movie industry with his brother Weldon Bascom in the 1954 Hollywood western, The Lawless Rider, starring Weldon's wife Texas Rose Bascom. Earl was one of the outlaws in the movie. Weldon was the sheriff and one of the stuntmen.

After graduating from college, Bascom and his wife moved to Southgate, California. Retiring from rodeo after one last season, he pursued his art career and ranched. Earl Bascom and his brother Weldon Bascom worked on a ranch in Perris, California, which was formerly owned by Louis B. Mayer of Hollywood's MGM Studios. Earl worked on the Rex Ellsworth Ranch in Chino, California. Earl was a distant cousin on the Bascom side to Mitch Tenney who was Ellsworth's horse trainer. Earl worked on Al Hamblin's Flying V Ranch in the Beaumont area. Earl had his own cattle ranch in Ontario in San Bernardino Valley using the Two Bar Quarter Circle brand, before moving to the high desert, living in Hesperia, Apple Valley and Victorville. During World War II, Bascom was a member of the International Brotherhood of Boilermakers, Iron Ship Builders, Blacksmiths, Forgers and Helpers union and worked as a shipfitter in the Long Beach shipyards building ships for the war effort.

Later, Earl Bascom and his son-in-law Mel Marion worked with Roy Rogers being filmed for TV commercials for the Roy Rogers Restaurant chain. The restaurant chain was then owned by the Marriott Corporation. When the Roy Rogers Riding Stables operated in Apple Valley, California, managed by Mel Marion and later Billy Bascom, Earl and his son John worked there wrangling horses and driving the hay wagon.

In 1966, after getting his teaching certificate from Brigham Young University and teaching art classes as a student teacher at the Springville (Utah) High School held in the Springville Art Museum, Bascom taught high school art classes in Barstow, California, at John F. Kennedy High School and at Barstow High School. He also served as president of the High Desert Artists (now Artists of the High Desert), and later as president of the Buckaroo Artists of America.

Earl Bascom was a published historian with his writings on cowboy and rodeo history printed in books, magazines and newspapers. He was a member of the Western Writers of America association. His first-known published writing was in 1926 for the Cardston newspaper, narrating a week-long trek into the Canadian Rocky Mountains that he and his friends took on horseback and pack horse.

Earl also assisted his nephew Billy Bascom in teaching horsemanship, as well as cowboy and rodeo history at the Victor Valley College in Victorville, California. Earl Bascom was later inducted into the Victor Valley College Alumni Hall of Fame having taken art classes at the college when it first opened.

=== International artist ===
Bascom became internationally known as a cowboy artist and sculptor with his art being exhibited in the United States, Canada, Europe, and Asia.

Bascom rounded up horses in the Sweetgrass Hills area of Montana along Kicking Horse Creek in the late 1920s. The Montana Historical Society Museum in Helena exhibited Bascom's cowboy gear and his art work, along with Charlie Russell's art work, in two exhibits titled "Riders Under the Big Sky" and "The Horse in Art."

In 1994, Bascom was commissioned by the Texas Longhorn Quincentennial Celebration Committee to produce his sculpture of what was deemed "the most authentic example of a classical Texas longhorn steer."

He was honored by the Professional Rodeo Cowboy Artists Association as the first rodeo cowboy to become a professional cowboy artist and sculptor. He was the first cowboy artist to be honored as a Fellow of the Royal Society of Arts of London since the society's beginning in 1754.

In the summer of 2005, the week-long Earl W. Bascom Memorial Rodeo was held in Berlin, Germany, during the German-American Heritage Celebration where his cowboy art was exhibited as an honor by the European Rodeo Cowboys Association for Bascom's worldwide influence upon the sport of rodeo. "It was an honor to memorialize Earl Bascom," said Steve Witt, vice-president of European Rodeo Cowboy Association. "The rodeo equipment he designed back in 1920s has had an influence on rodeo worldwide."

Equestrian historian Kathy Young said, "Earl Bascom was noted for bridging two worlds, that of rodeo competition and western art."

On July 24, 2014, Bascom was made the international honoree of the National Day of the Cowboy and given the "Cowboy Keeper" award.

In June 2015, Bascom was awarded the Order of Sport, marking his induction into Canada's Sports Hall of Fame, as the first rodeo champion ever honored and given Canada's highest sports honor as a "Canadian Sports Legend."

"As a Canadian rodeo athlete and cowboy artist, Earl Bascom is a national treasure", stated Helena Deng, senior curator of Canada's Sports Hall of Fame.

"Bascom's incredible achievements are now to be shared with all Canadians in perpetuity", said Mario Siciliano, president of Canada's Sports Hall of Fame, "inspiring generations of Canadians in sports and in life."

In 2017, Canada's Sports Hall of Fame had an exhibit titled "The Horse in Sports" which included Bascom's cowboy gear and his cowboy art.

On January 4, 2023, Payson City Mayor William R. Wright and the city of Payson, Utah presented a proclamation honoring Earl Bascom and Raymond Knight as Rodeo Pioneers who contributed to Payson's rodeo heritage.

Bascom's bucking chute is listed among famous moments in sports for the year of 1919 by sports history writer Marc Bona.

Bascom said of his own art work, "I've tried to portray the West as I knew it – rough and rugged and tough as a boot but with a good heart and honest as the day is long."

== Death ==
Bascom died on August 28, 1995, at age 89, at his ranch in Victorville, California.

== Tribute statements ==
The U.S. House of Representatives honored Earl Bascom as an "American Hero" in 1985 and gave tribute honor in the Congressional Record in 1995.

United States Congressman, the Honorable Jerry Lewis, said in 1995 in "A Tribute to Earl Wesley Bascom" as printed in the Congressional Record, that Earl Bascom was a "cowboy hero and a true inspiration...(who) lived one of the most interesting lives ever known in modern cowboy history."

Bascom was listed in Who's Who in American Art, Who's Who in Western Writers of America, Who's Who in the West, Who's Who in California, Who's Who in America and Who's Who in the World.

Paul de Fonville, curator of the Cowboy Memorial Museum, gave tribute to Earl Bascom as "one of the great pioneers of rodeo – a cowboy through and through."

The American Cowboy magazine and others have called Earl Bascom a "Renaissance Cowboy" – one who was a main contributor and participant in the renewed interest in cowboy life including the sport of rodeo and western art.

Cowboy celebrity Roy Rogers, who worked with Earl Bascom in TV commercials and was a collector of Bascom art, once said, "Earl Bascom is a walking book of history. His knowledge of the Old West was acquired the old fashioned way – he was born and raised in it."

"Earl Bascom's 2013 induction into the Rodeo Hall of Fame is one of the top honors bestowed upon a cowboy," said Pam Minick, president of the Rodeo Historical Society. He is credited with designing the first side-delivery bucking chute in 1916, and then the first reverse-opening side-delivery chute, the first hornless bronc saddle, and the first one-hand bareback rigging. A member of the Cowboys' Turtle Association, he won bareback and saddle bronc titles across North America."

Earl Bascom was honored as the 2014 International Honoree of the National Day of the Cowboy with these words – "As a rodeo pioneer, an all-around champion, an internationally known artist and a cowboy, Earl W. Bascom has been inducted into more halls of fame than any cowboy in the world."

The Guide to the Calgary Stampede published, "With the induction of Earl W. Bascom in 2015, Canada's Sports Hall of Fame welcomed its first Honoured Member known for Rodeo. With the help of innovators like Bascom, the modernized version of the sport features new methods and equipment which helped shape the face and spirit of the Greatest Outdoor Show on Earth (the Calgary Stampede)."

In 2016, Bascom and his brother Weldon were the first rodeo cowboys to be given the ProRodeo Hall of Fame Ken Stemler Pioneer Award. At hall of fame ceremonies, director Kent Sturman declared Earl Bascom to be a "true rodeo pioneer." He recognized Bascom for "his complete dedication to the sport of professional rodeo spanning several decades; for his contributions as a rodeo equipment and gear inventor and designer; for his innovation and foresight as the 'Father of Modern Rodeo' and the 'Father of Brahma Bull Riding'; and for his contributions as a rodeo athlete and champion, producer, stock contractor, announcer, clown, trick rider, historian, author, artist and sculptor, and western movie actor that helped advance the development and success of professional rodeo."

"Earl Bascom is the Michael Phelps of rodeo," stated Ken Knopp, historian of the Mississippi Rodeo Hall of Fame.

Author of Rodeo History and Legends, Bob Jordan, said – "The Bascom boys helped shape the sport of rodeo more than any other family in the world."

Earl Bascom was chosen by the Toronto Star as one of 150 of Canada's greatest athletes, including Wayne Gretsky and Steve Nash, to represent Canada during its 150th year (1867–2017) of Confederation. Sports writer Kerry Gillespie wrote, "Angry bulls to wild horses, there wasn't anything on four legs that Earl Bascom couldn't get the better of ..."

The Cardston Historical Society recorded, "Earl Bascom and his brothers designed and built the first side-delivery bucking chute on the Bascom Ranch at Welliing Station. In 1922, Earl made a hornless rodeo saddle, which the cowboys called the "mulee", and first used it at the Cardston Stampede. Bascom's rodeo innovations helped change rodeo from a cowboy's pastime to an international sport and placed him on the list of Canada's most famous inventors."

Wyoming radio personality Rich Roddam named Earl Bascom in 2018 as one of 13 famous people from small Wyoming towns - "In a state full of cowboys, Earl Bascom may have been the best. Considered the "Father of Modern Rodeo", Bascom gained fame as an actor, artist, inventor, and writer."

Earl Bascom is the only cowboy mentioned in the official Mississippi Encyclopedia, was the first inductee of the Mississippi Rodeo Hall of Fame and honored on a Mississippi State Historical Marker at the birthplace of Mississippi rodeo. Mississippi academicians consider Bascom to be one of the greatest cowboys in their state's history.

The Fence Post magazine wrote, "Variations of Bascom's rigging of 1924 and his bucking chute of 1919 have since become world-wide rodeo standards, used at rodeos in North America, Central America, and South America, from Hawaii to Japan to New Zealand and Australia, as well as in Europe and South Africa."

Utah Governor Spencer J. Cox declared November 5 to be Rodeo Pioneer Day in Utah wherein Earl Bascom was honored in 2022.

== Awards and honors ==
Rodeo Championships
Year	Stampede	Award	Location
1930	3-Bar Ranch Stampede	All-Around Champion	Saskatchewan
1933	Calgary Stampede	Reserve Champion, Steer Decorating, North American Championship	Calgary, Alberta
1933	Lethbridge Stampede	World Record time, Steer Decorating	Lethbridge, Alberta
1933	Lethbridge Stampede and Raymond Stampede	Arena Record time, Steer Decorating	Alberta
1933	Rodeo Association of America	Championship of the World, Third Place in Steer Decorating	
1934	Lethbridge Stampede	Bareback and All-Around Champion	Lethbridge, Alberta
1935	Raymond Stampede	Saddle Bronc, Steer Decorating and All-Around Champion	Raymond, Alberta
1936	Ute Stampede	All-Around Champion	Nephi, Utah
1937	Pocatello Rodeo	Saddle Bronc, Bareback, Bull Riding and All-Around Champion	Pocatello, Idaho
1938	Rigby Stampede	Bareback and All-Around Champion	Rigby, Idaho
1939	Hooper Rodeo	Saddle Bronc, Bareback and All-Around Champion	Hooper, Utah
1939	Portland Rodeo	Bareback, Bull Riding and All-Around Champion	Portland, Oregon
1940	Raymond Stampede	Saddle Bronc, Bareback and All-Around Champion	Raymond, Alberta

Honorary Titles
Award	Location	Year
Grand Marshal	Cardston, Alberta	1982
Grand Marshal	Raymond, Alberta	1984
Grand Marshal	Columbia, Mississippi	1985
Grand Marshal	Vernal, Utah	1989
Grand Marshal	Apple Valley, California	
Grand Marshal	Victorville, California	
Grand Marshal	Hesperia, California	1997

=== Tributes ===
Award	Host
Bascom Brothers	50th Year Anniversary Rodeo, Columbia, Mississippi, 1985
Earl W. Bascom Award	Marion County Cattlemen's Association Rodeo, Mississippi, 1999
Earl W. Bascom Memorial Rodeo	Berlin, Germany, 2005
Earl Bascom All-Around Champion Award	Dillon Rodeo, Montana
Earl W. Bascom All-Around Champion Award	Hesperia Rodeo, California
Earl W. Bascom Bareback Champion Award	Dinosaur Roundup Rodeo, Vernal, Utah
Earl W. Bascom – Utah Heritage Award	Days of '47 Rodeo, Salt Lake City, Utah
Earl W. Bascom – Lethbridge Heritage Award	Whoop-Up Days Pro Rodeo, Lethbridge, Alberta
Earl Bascom Saddle Bronc Rookie Award	National High School Finals Rodeo
Earl Bascom Bareback Rookie Award	National High School Finals Rodeo
Earl Bascom Memorial Scholarship	Rocky Mountain High School, Cowley, Wyoming

=== Hall of Fame inductions and other honors ===
- Canadian Pro Rodeo Hall of Fame (Ponoka, Alberta Canada), 1984
- Marion County Cattlemen's Hall of Fame (Mississippi), 1985
- Key to the city of Columbia (Mississippi), 1985
- Utah Sports Hall of Fame (Salt Lake City, Utah), 1985
- Raymond Sports Hall of Fame (Raymond, Alberta Canada), 1987
- Fellow of the Royal Society of Arts (London, England), 1993
- Cowboy Memorial and Museum (Caliente, California), 2000
- United States Sports Academy Walk of Fame (Georgia), 2002
- Trailblazers Hall of Fame (Alberta, Canada), 2010
- Lethbridge Sports Hall of Fame (Alberta, Canada), 2012
- Victor Valley College Alumni Hall of Fame (California), 2012
- Victor Valley Museum (California), 2012
- Alberta Sports Hall of Fame (Red Deer, Alberta, Canada,) 2013
- National Cowboy & Western Heritage Museum Rodeo Hall of Fame (Oklahoma City, Oklahoma), 2013
- Utah Rodeo Hall of Fame (Ogden, Utah), 2013
- National Day of the Cowboy honoree, 2014
- Cowboy Keeper Hall of Fame, 2014
- Canada's Sports Hall of Fame (Calgary, Alberta Canada), 2015
- Mississippi Rodeo Hall of Fame (Columbia, Mississippi), 2016
- Idaho Rodeo Hall of Fame (Gooding, Idaho), 2016
- Utah Cowboy Hall of Fame, emeritus Honoree (Ogden, Utah), 2016
- ProRodeo Hall of Fame, Pioneer Award (Colorado Springs, Colorado), 2016
- Official State Historical Marker "Birthplace of Mississippi Rodeo" erected 2018 (Columbia, Mississippi)
- National Bareback Riding Hall of Fame, 2019
- Canadian Order of Sport, 2020
- Canadian Trick Riding Hall of Fame 2021
- Cowboy and Arena Champions Hall of Fame 2022

=== Rodeo innovations ===
Bascom is known as an innovator and designer of rodeo equipment and rodeo gear. His inventions include:

- first side-delivery bucking chute (1916) at Welling, Alberta (assisted by brothers Raymond, Melvin and father John W. Bascom)
- first reverse-opening side-delivery bucking chute (1919) at Lethbridge, Alberta (assisted by his father John W. Bascom)
- first hornless rodeo bronc saddle (1922) at Lethbridge, Alberta
- first one-hand bareback rigging (1924) at Stirling, Alberta
- first high-cut rodeo chaps (1926) at Raymond, Alberta
- rodeo exerciser (1928) at Raymond, Alberta
- first rodeo held in the state of Mississippi
- first Mississippi night rodeo held outdoors under electric lights (September 24, 1935), at Columbia, Mississippi
- first use of brahma bulls in rodeo at Columbia, Mississippi, 1935
- first permanent rodeo arena with bucking chutes and grandstands in the state of Mississippi (1936) at Columbia, Mississippi

== See also ==
- Canadian pioneers in early Hollywood
- List of ProRodeo Hall of Fame inductees
- List of Canadian Pro Rodeo Hall of Fame inductees
- Raymond Stampede
- List of cowboys and cowgirls
- List of Brigham Young University alumni
- List of Latter-day Saints
- List of members of Canada's Sports Hall of Fame
- List of famous Canadian sports personalities
- List of Fellows of the Royal Society of Arts
- List of people considered father or mother of a field
