= Raymond Stampede =

The Raymond Stampede is an annual rodeo held in the town of Raymond, Alberta, Canada on July 1. It is recognized as Alberta's oldest rodeo and Canada's oldest professional rodeo, predating the famous Calgary Stampede by ten years.

== Early history ==
The inaugural Raymond Stampede took place in 1902 on a vacant lot as part of the town's Canada Day celebration. Organized by rancher Raymond Knight, cowboys from nearby ranches were invited to participate in events such as saddle bronc riding and steer roping. A chute was constructed for the steer roping competition, while the bucking horses were blindfolded and snubbed before being ridden until they stopped bucking.

Ray Knight, the stock contractor, supplied the bucking horses and roping steers from his ranch on the Milk River Ridge south of town. The first Stampede drew a large crowd, with participants including Raymond Knight, DeLoss Lund, Ed Corless, Dick Kinsey, Frank Faulkner, Jim Austin, and Steve Austin. Knight is considered a pioneer of rodeo in Canada, having coined the terms "stampede" and "stampeding," which are now widely used to refer to rodeo events.

In 1903, Raymond Knight financed the construction of Canada's first permanent rodeo grounds, which featured an oval track, a single bucking chute, and a covered grandstand. The rodeo grounds also included a shotgun-style bucking chute, the first of its kind in rodeo history. These facilities were decommissioned with the last year being 2023. New stampede grounds were erected for the 2024 stampede at a new location in town.

The rodeo grounds and the Raymond Stampede were named after Raymond Knight, who financed and served as the arena director for nearly 40 years. The town of Raymond, as well as local institutions like the school, college, and opera house, were also named in his honor. The 1903 Raymond Stampede marked the first professional rodeo in Canada with official contest rules, entry fees, and prize money, establishing Ray Knight as the "Father of Canadian Professional Rodeo."

Throughout its history, the Raymond Stampede has featured various rodeo events, including saddle bronc, bareback bronc, and bull riding, as well as steer riding, saddled bull riding, steer decorating, steer wrestling, calf roping, steer roping, barrel racing, wild horse racing, wild cow milking, chariot racing, Roman standing racing, cowboy saddle horse racing, and Indian pony racing.

In 1924, the rodeo introduced the safer "Bascom bucking chutes," which were side-delivery reverse opening bucking chutes invented by the Bascoms in 1919. Raymond Knight, nicknamed the "Buffalo Bill of Canada" by the King of England, brought calf roping to Canada through the Raymond Stampede. He was recognized as the "Father of Canadian Calf Roping" and won the North American Calf Roping Championship in 1924 and 1926 at the Calgary Stampede.

The Raymond Stampede gained further distinction in 1934 when it hosted the world's first "senior professional calf roping event." Raymond Knight emerged as the champion, followed by Tom Three Persons in second place and Joe Snow in third.

Notable bucking horses from the early years of the Raymond Stampede include Easy Money, Box Car, Slim Sweden, Wild Boy, Calico Kid, Jack Dempsey, Tommy Gibbons, Ironsides, Lonely Valley Grey, C Cross Black, C Cross Grey, Horned Toad, Hot Shot, Spot-on-the-Belly, and Fox. The bucking horse named "Fox," owned by the Knight and Day Stampede Company, was later sold to the Pendleton Roundup in Oregon and renamed "No Name." "No Name" was recognized as the "greatest bucking horse of all time" and featured in "Ripley's Believe It or Not."

One of the Stampede's most famous bucking bulls was Romeo, which could only be ridden with a saddle. Only two cowboys, Mel Bascom and his brother Earl Bascom, successfully rode Romeo to the whistle in 1928.

Due to the traditional Sabbath observance in the predominantly Latter-day Saint community of Raymond, the Stampede is held on June 30 when July 1 falls on a Sunday.

Since its inception in 1902, the Raymond Stampede has been held annually, with exceptions in 1917-1918 (due to the Spanish Flu), 1937 (due to severe drought), and 2020 (due to the COVID-19 pandemic). The event has been managed and directed by the Raymond Stampede Committee, led for many years by rodeo director Alan Heggie and his family.

== Raymond Stampede contestants and performers of note ==
- Earl W. Bascom
- Texas Rose Bascom
- Raymond Knight
- Reg Kesler
- Herman Linder
- Tom Three Persons

== See also ==
- Festivals in Alberta
- Canadian Finals Rodeo
