= Stock contractor =

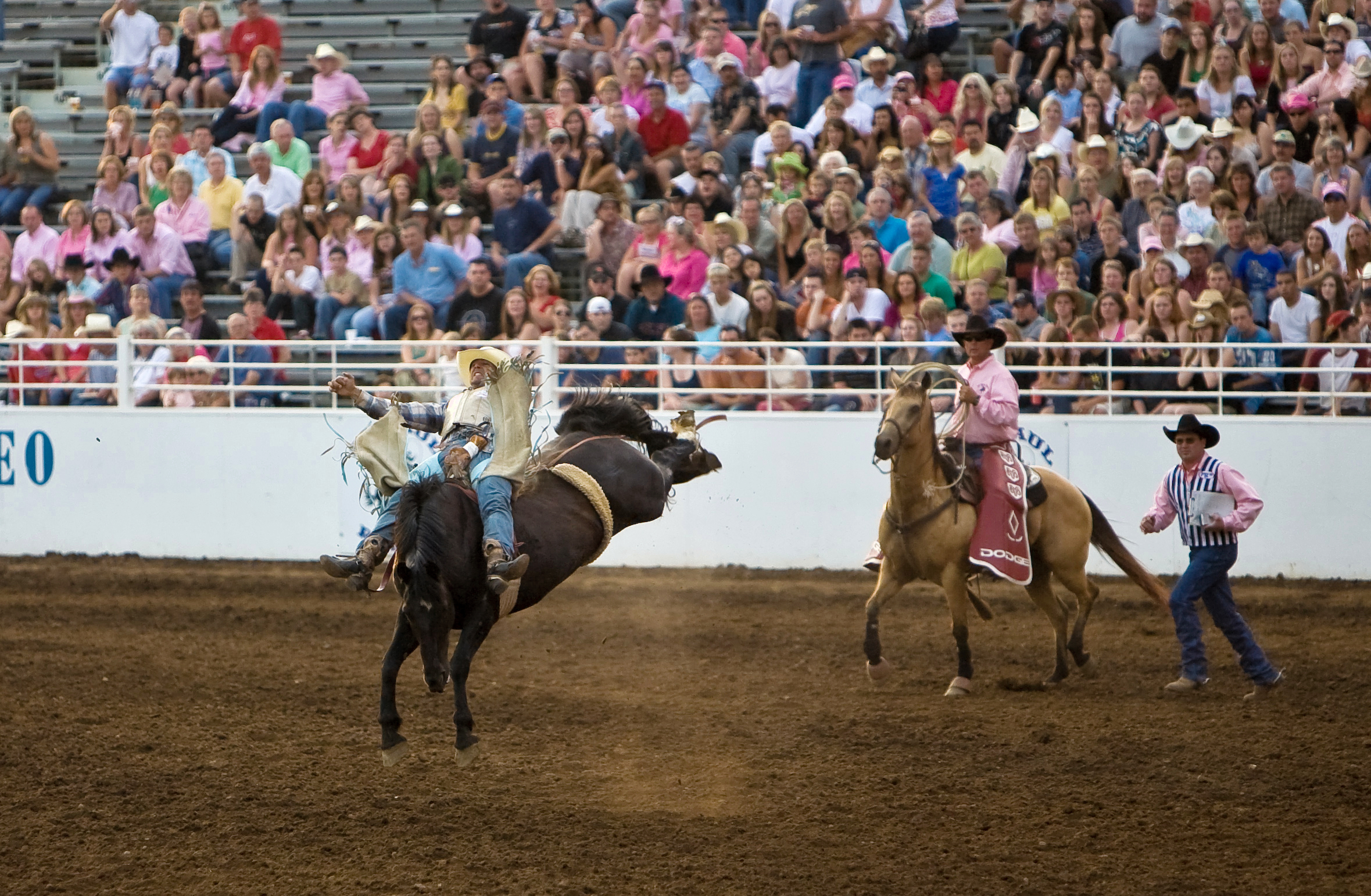
A stock contractor provides animals for roughstock and roping events at rodeos

A stock contractor is an individual or business that provides animals for rodeo competition. Stock contractors supply rough stock - bucking horses for saddle bronc and bareback bronc riding (called buck jumpers in Australia) and bucking bulls for bull riding, plus steers for steer wrestling and team roping, plus calves for calf roping (also known as tie-down roping) and breakaway roping events. The use of stock contractors who specialize in providing these animals has produced a more uniform range of bucking stock which is also quieter to handle.

Most bucking stock is specifically bred for use in rodeos, with horses and bulls having exceptional bucking ability often selling for high prices. Most are allowed to grow up in a natural, semi-wild condition on the open range, but also have to be tamed and gentled to be managed from the ground, safely loaded into trailers, vaccinated and wormed, placed into bucking chutes, and used in the arena. Due to the rigors of travel and the short bursts of high intensity work required, most horses in a bucking string are at least six or seven years old. In Australia, stock contractors may also supply some of the brumbies used in the "brumby catch" event which is part of stockman challenges.

== History ==
In 1902, Raymond Knight started the Raymond Stampede and became known as "the father of Canadian rodeo." In 1903 he built the first rodeo arena and grandstand in Canada, and in the process became both the first rodeo producer and the first rodeo stock contractor. Knight was originally from Utah and ranched in the Milk River Ridge area of southern Alberta. He ran over 18,000 head of cattle and several hundred horses on almost a million acres, and the town of Raymond, Alberta was named after him. For the first Calgary Stampede in 1912, Knight teamed up with Addison Day, a Texan who ranched in Alberta and Saskatchewan. They became partners in a rodeo stock contracting company called the Knight and Day Stampede Company. They produced a rodeo in Saskatoon for the future King of England in 1919, and produced a rodeo in Shelby, Montana during the Dempsey-Gibbons fight in 1923 where Knight financed the building of what was then the world's largest rodeo arena with wooden seating for 20,000 people. After that single rodeo the arena was disassembled. Addison Day went on to produce the first rodeo in the Los Angeles Coliseum in 1927.

In 1924, Tex Austin produced the first rodeo in London, England. The Flying U Rodeo Company was formed in the 1930s by J.C. "Doc" Sorensen of St. Anthony, Idaho. He later sold out to A.H. "Cotton" Rosser of Marysville, California. That rodeo stock contracting company is now the world's oldest.

In 1935, Earl W. Bascom, along with his brother Weldon, Mel and Jake Lybbert and Waldo "Salty" Ross produced the first rodeos in southern Mississippi, working from Columbia, in the process holding the South's first night rodeo held outdoors under electric lights and bringing in brahma bulls for the bull riding event. These rodeos also featured trick roping, stunt riding and other novelty acts. Bascom's father, John W. Bascom, had been Ray Knight's ranch foreman. Mississippi rancher Sam Hickman financed their operations, which were successful from 1935 to 1937.

In the 1950s, one of the best-known modern North American stock contractors, Reg Kesler set up a string of roughstock due to the growing demand for bucking horses. He supplied stock to rodeos and events across Canada and the United States before retiring in 1967. Kessler was posthumously inducted into the National Cowboy & Western Museum Rodeo Hall of Fame in October 2009.

== Innovations ==
Brothers Raymond, Melvin and Earl Bascom, known as the "Bronc Bustin' Bascom Boys", developed the first modern rodeo bucking chute with a side-opening gate in 1916, modifying the design in 1919 so that the gate opened at the head of the animal, a design still in standard use today. Earl Bascom also made the first hornless bronc saddle in 1922 and the first one-handed bareback rigging in 1924. In 1926, he created a design for chaps with a high-cut leg that was the predecessor to modern-day rodeo batwing chaps. Earl Bascom was inducted into both the Canadian Pro Rodeo Hall of Fame and the Utah Sports Hall of Fame.

In 1938, two other Canadian cowboys, Clark Lund and Herman Linder, came back from rodeoing in Australia and each independently became rodeo stock contractors. On their bucking stock they started using a quick-release flank strap which was made in Australia which is now the standard at all rodeos.

== See also ==
- Professional Rodeo Cowboys Association
- Professional Bull Riders
- Pickup rider
- Rodeo clown
