= Marty Wood =

American rodeo cowboy (1933–2019)

Martin Roy Wood (June 4, 1933 – August 10, 2019) was a rodeo cowboy from Bowness, Calgary, in the province of Alberta, Canada. The ProRodeo Hall of Fame inducted Wood in 1991. He was also inducted into the Canadian Pro Rodeo Hall of Fame in 1994. Wood died on August 10, 2019, in Pendleton, Oregon.

== Early life ==
Marty was born June 4, 1933, in Carstairs, Alberta, Canada, to Dorothy and Harry Wood. His great-grandfather was Henry Wise Wood, the founding president of the United Farmers of Alberta, who had settled in Carstairs in 1905. Marty's family moved to Bowness, then a small hamlet just outside Calgary, in 1940 or 1941, and he attended school there. Wood started his connection with horses at an early age. When Wood was 3 years old, his father gave him a pony to ride. However, Wood was first a fan of baseball. Wood was serious about the sport until an ankle injury sidelined him from a career. The injury did not effect his rodeo abilities.

His parents built a house and opened the Wood's Riding Academy, where Wood learned to break, ride and show horses. Wood also schooled colts and green jumpers. Wood rode his first contact horse at Olds, Alberta. Wood sometimes rode bareback horses and bulls, but he decided to drop these to focus on saddle bronc riding. He took up rodeo in the early 1950s and soon specialized in saddle bronc riding. He won his first professional rodeo championship in Omaha, Nebraska, in 1953. He made six almost perfect rides at that event. He rode at Nebraska as an amateur but won the saddle bronc riding and most of the day money. Wood was known for his style, balance, and ability to foretell a horse's actions. The theory is that he developed these skills riding his father's jump horses.

== Career ==
Wood was the Canadian Champion Saddle Bronc Rider in 1954, 1955, and 1963. Wood was the Rodeo Cowboys Association (RCA) World Champion in 1958, 1964, and 1966; the association was renamed to the Professional Rodeo Cowboys Association in 1975 as it is now known. and won the Calgary Stampede a total of five times, in 1954, 1957, 1961, 1964, and 1965. He also won at Cheyenne Frontier Days; Madison Square Garden, New York City; San Francisco Cow Palace, California; Fort Worth, Texas; Houston, Texas; Salinas, California; Boston Garden, Massachusetts; and Oklahoma City, Oklahoma, rodeos.

Wood came in second place in the World Standings for the season four times – 1957, 1962 through 1963, and 1967. He never finished below fifth place in the World Standings from 1957 through 1967. He qualified 15 times for the National Finals Rodeo. In saddle bronc riding, he is tied for fifth place for the most qualifications in saddle bronc riding. A friend, Arland Calvert, who was a ProRodeo Sports News writer, once described Wood's bronc riding technique: "Marty's slashing style – nobody reaches out front (in spurring) any farther or uses the full spread with more vigor – has been compared to the late Pete Knight by many old-timers."

Wood also trained horses. In fact, Wood was a pioneer in the setup, running, and teaching of a bronc riding school. Wood went into partnership with Harry Vold in running a school. Vold is the late Hall of Fame stock contractor who owned a ranch in Avondale, Colorado. A 1971 Western Horseman article tells the story of Wood's teaching style, even mentioning that it includes everything "but riding side saddle" with his students.

== Personal life ==
Wood was married to Jean Routh in the 1950s, and the couple had one son, Chip. The couple divorced in the late 1960s. He had one partner for the last 35 years of his life, Kelly McCormach. During his career, Wood suffered many injuries, including breaking his leg seven times, fracturing both feet and ankles, breaking some ribs and his collarbone. Because of the cumulative effect of his injuries, he retired in 1974, going on to train American Quarter Horses and Thoroughbreds for racing and jumping. He last lived in Pendleton, Oregon.

== Death and legacy ==
Wood died in Pendleton, Oregon, on August 10, 2019, from cancer. He was 86 years old.

=== Honors ===
- 2008 Rodeo Hall of Fame of the National Cowboy and Western Heritage Museum
- 2006 Ellensburg Rodeo Hall of Fame
- 1994 Canadian Pro Rodeo Hall of Fame
- 1994 Alberta Sports Hall of Fame
- 1991 ProRodeo Hall of Fame
