= Buffalo Bill and the Indians, or Sitting Bull's History Lesson =

1976 film by Robert Altman

- Theatrical release poster
- Directed by: Robert Altman
- Screenplay by: Alan Rudolph; Robert Altman
- Based on: Indians (1969 play) by Arthur Kopit
- Produced by: Robert Altman
- Starring: Paul Newman; Joel Grey; Kevin McCarthy; Harvey Keitel; Will Sampson; Allan F. Nicholls; Geraldine Chaplin; John Considine; Burt Lancaster; Bert Remsen; Evelyn Lear
- Cinematography: Paul Lohmann
- Edited by: Peter Appleton; Dennis M. Hill
- Music by: Richard Baskin
- Production company: Lion's Gate Films; Dino De Laurentiis Corporation; Mayflower Films
- Distributed by: United Artists
- Release date: June 24, 1976
- Running time: 123 minutes
- Country: United States
- Language: English
- Budget: $7.1 million
- Box office: $7.2 million (rentals)

Buffalo Bill and the Indians, or Sitting Bull's History Lesson is a 1976 revisionist Western film directed, produced, and co-written by Robert Altman. It is based on Arthur Kopit's 1968 play Indians. It stars Paul Newman as William F. Cody, alias Buffalo Bill, along with Geraldine Chaplin, Will Sampson, Joel Grey, Harvey Keitel, and Burt Lancaster as Bill's biographer, Ned Buntline.

The film won the Golden Bear at the 26th Berlin International Film Festival, and was released in the U.S. on June 24, 1976. As in his earlier film M*A*S*H, Altman skewers an American historical myth of heroism, in this case the notion that noble white men fighting bloodthirsty savages won the West. However, the film was poorly received at the time of its release, as the country was celebrating its bicentennial.

== Plot summary ==
The story begins in 1885 with the arrival of an important new guest star in Buffalo Bill Cody's grand illusion, Chief Sitting Bull of Little Big Horn fame. Much to Cody's annoyance, Sitting Bull proves not to be a murdering savage but a genuine embodiment of what the whites believe about their own history out west. He is quietly heroic and morally pure.

Sitting Bull also refuses to portray Custer's Last Stand as a cowardly sneak attack. Instead, he asks Cody to act out the massacre of a peaceful Sioux village by marauding bluecoats. An enraged Cody fires him but is forced to relent when star attraction Annie Oakley takes Sitting Bull's side.

== Cast ==
- Paul Newman as Buffalo Bill, "The Star"
- Geraldine Chaplin as Annie Oakley, "The Sure Shot"
- Burt Lancaster as Ned Buntline, "The Legend Maker"
- Kevin McCarthy as Major John M. Burke, "The Publicist"
- Joel Grey as Nate Salsbury, "The Producer"
- Harvey Keitel as Ed Goodman, "The Relative"
- John Considine as Frank E. Butler, The Sure Shot's Manager"
- Frank Kaquitts as Sitting Bull, "The Indian"
- Will Sampson as William Halsey, "The Interpreter"
- Pat McCormick as President Grover Cleveland, "The President of the United States"
- Shelley Duvall as Mrs. Frances Cleveland, "The First Lady"
- Allan F. Nicholls as Prentiss Ingraham, "The Journalist"
- Robert DoQui as Oswald Dart, "The Wrangler"
- Evelyn Lear as Nina Cavallini, "The Lyric Soprano"
- Mike Kaplan as Jules Keen, "The Treasurer"
- Bert Remsen as "Crutch," "The Bartender"
- Bonnie Leaders as The Mezzo-Contralto
- Noelle Rogers as Lucille DuCharme, "The Lyric-Coloratura"
- Denver Pyle as McLaughlin, "The Indian Agent"
- Ken Krossa as Johnny Baker, "The Arenic Director"
- Fred N. Larsen as Buck Taylor, "The King of the Cowboys"
- Jerri and Joy Duce as The Cowboy Trick Riders
- Alex Green and Gary MacKenzie as The Mexican Whip and Fast Draw Act
- Humphrey Gratz as The Old Soldier
- Dennis Corrie as Rancher
- Patrick Reynolds as President Cleveland's Aide

== Historical interpretation ==
Like many of Altman's films, Buffalo Bill and the Indians is an ensemble piece with an episodic structure. It follows the day-to-day performances and behind-the-scenes intrigues of Buffalo Bill Cody's famous "Wild West", a hugely popular 1880s entertainment spectacular that starred the former Indian fighter, scout, and buffalo hunter. Altman uses the setting to criticize Old West motifs, presenting the eponymous western hero as a show-biz creation who can no longer separate his invented image from reality.

Altman's Cody is a loud-mouthed buffoon, a man who claims to be one with the Wild West but lives in luxury, play-acting daily in a western circus of his own making. Cody's long hair is a wig, he can't shoot straight anymore or track an Indian, and all his staged battles with ruffians and savages are rigged in his favor. However, this does not keep him from acting as if his triumphs are real, or plaguing his patient entourage of yes-men with endless monologues about himself.

== Production ==
Most of the film was shot on location in Alberta, Canada, mostly on the Stoney Indian Reserve. Frank "Sitting Wind" Kaquitts, who played Sitting Bull, had been elected the first ever chief of Alberta's Nakoda (Stoney) First Nation, after three bands had amalgamated the year before.

The film was co written by Alan Rudolph. Robert Altman persuaded United Artists to back Rudolph's debut feature Welcome to LA along with this one.

== Release ==
A preview showing in New York in May 1976 received a mixed reaction from the press. Following this, Altman recut the film slightly by removing a few of the Wild West show acts.

== Reception ==
=== Critical response ===
Charles Champlin of the Los Angeles Times wrote that "[Altman's] films are sometimes pretentious and sometimes exasperating, but they are not often boring, although his latest, 'Buffalo Bill and the Indians, or Sitting Bull's History Lesson' is all three." He went on, "using Newman as neither villainous, heroic nor romantic but only as a fairly uninteresting lout seems a dire waste, and there is an air of low-energy distraction throughout 'Buffalo Bill.' For the last 20 minutes it is as if nobody knew how to get off that dusty reservation but would have been glad to." Arthur D. Murphy of Variety wrote that the film "emerges as a puerile satire on the legends of the Buffalo Bill era, silly when it's not cynical, distasteful throughout its 123 minutes. Paul Newman has rarely been seen so badly." Gary Arnold of The Washington Post stated, "Everyone who cares about Altman's work should find 'Buffalo Bill' an interesting and intriguing experience, but in the last analysis it's an emotionally empty, alienating movie, an ill-advised attempt to project a cynical, apprehensive view of the present onto the past." Jonathan Rosenbaum of The Monthly Film Bulletin wrote that "Altman appears to know a lot more about show business than about the American Indian, and what he knows about the former mainly consists of behavioral observation; by scaling this observation down exclusively to what illustrates his thesis—the hollow fakery of Buffalo Bill and his followers—he thus allows himself precious little to work with, thematically or otherwise. Within five minutes, everything he has to say on the subject is apparent."

Among positive reviews, Vincent Canby of The New York Times wrote, "It's a sometimes self-indulgent, confused, ambitious movie that is often very funny and always fascinating." Gene Siskel of the Chicago Tribune gave the film a full four out of four stars, writing that while the film's ideas weren't anything special, "Altman's movies are innovative. They surprise us with their physical beauty, their wit, and their style. 'Buffalo Bill''s few pompous moments are overwhelmed by the fluid energy of the piece." Penelope Gilliatt of The New Yorker identified the film as being "about sorts of dreams ... perhaps it is true that white men tend to dream only of things going well, whereas Indians, like many aboriginal people, dream of death, initiation, possibility; the rock face on which waking life has no purchase."

On review aggregator Rotten Tomatoes, the film has an approval rating of 65% based on 20 reviews, with an average rating of 6.50/10.

=== Awards and nominations ===
In 1976, the film was entered into the 26th Berlin International Film Festival, where it won the Golden Bear.
