= Chamber Music (play) =

One-act play written by Arthur Kopit

- Written by: Arthur Kopit
- Genre: One-act play • Theatre of the Absurd
- Setting: An insane asylum in 1938

Chamber Music is a 1962 one-act play by absurdist playwright Arthur Kopit. The story is set in 1938 and concerns eight famous women from different historical periods who all are interned in the same insane asylum.

== Participants ==
The women are — or at least believe they are — author Gertrude Stein, martyr Joan of Arc, activist Susan B. Anthony, politician Queen Isabella I of Spain, Constanze Mozart (wife of the famed composer), pilot Amelia Earhart, silent-film actress Pearl White, and explorer Osa Johnson. They have come together to represent the women of the asylum in planning for an attack they believe is soon to come from the men's ward. The doctor is an omnipresent figure in the asylum, checking in on the women.

In the play's context, it is suggested that the woman who claims she is Amelia Earhart could be telling the truth instead of being insane, given the time frame and that Earhart went missing. There are beliefs that the play is meant to symbolize the sexist and unjust treatment of women throughout history.

== Print and performance ==
The play was published in 1965 by Hill and Wang, New York, and was first performed in 1962 at Society Hill Playhouse, Philadelphia.
