= Rayel Robinson =

Canadian barrel racer

- Born: Rayel Call; 1964 (age 61–62); Redding, California, United States
- Other names: Rayel Little
- Occupations: Horse trainer and barrel racer
- Years active: 1982-present

Rayel Robinson (also known as Rayel Little) is a Canadian horse trainer and barrel racing champion. She won the Canadian barrel racing championship in her sport in back-to-back wins in 1990 and 1991, and repeated in 1999 and 2005. She was reigning champion of the Ponoka Stampede in 2005, 2006, and 2007. She trained Tia, the horse who was awarded the Most Heart designation of the Canadian Finals Rodeo in 1991 and 1992 and in a single year had five horses that she trained qualify for the Canadian Finals Rodeo. She was inducted into the Canadian Pro Rodeo Hall of Fame in 2017.

== Early life ==
Rayel Call was born in 1964 in Redding, California, United States, but moved with her family to 150 Mile House, British Columbia, Canada, when she was ten years old. Around the same time, she began competing in barrel racing events. She graduated from Columneetza Senior Secondary School in Williams Lake, British Columbia, in 1982. That year, she won all-around cowgirl title at the National High School Finals Rodeo, held in Wyoming. Based upon her performance at the rodeo, she was offered a scholarship to attend Casper College in Casper, Wyoming. In June 1983, she won the Central Rocky Mountain Regional barrel racing trophy and the following month, took top honors in barrel racing at the Williams Lake Stampede. While she was in school, Call met Bruce Robinson, a member of the faculty of Casper College, at a rodeo event and they married in 1984. Her husband participated in calf roping events and first qualified for the Canadian Finals Rodeo in 1985, two years after his wife had first qualified.

== Career ==
Shortly after their marriage the Robinsons began training horses and located to Sundre, Alberta, where they operated an 80 acre ranch. In the winter months, the couple competed and trained in Arizona, returning to Canada in mid-March. In 1990, Robinson won the Canadian barrel racing championship and the following year, repeated as champion. In 1991, she qualified for the first time for the National Finals Rodeo in Las Vegas, Nevada, having set the earnings record that year in the Canadian finals. Her earnings represented the first time a woman had broken the $30,000 barrier in a single season for the Canadian Pro Tour. Her horse Tia won the "Horse with the Most Heart" award from the Canadian Finals Rodeo in 1991 and 1992, which is the award honoring the barrel racing horse with the fastest time.

By the end of the 1990s, Robinson had moved to Alix, Alberta, when she repeated as Canadian barrel racing champion in 1999, aboard her Quarter Horse Bud. In 2004, she won the Barrel Futurities of America world championship mounted on Lady Perks, owned by Grant Little. She won her fourth Canadian barrel racing championship in 2005, astride the same horse and that year, won the first of her three consecutive annual championships at the Ponoka Stampede. In 2007, she won her 19th trip to the Canadian Finals Rodeo, a qualifying record among barrel racers.

Robinson married Grant Little after 2010, and the couple resided in Thorsby, Alberta, for half the year and in Maricopa, Arizona, for the rest of the year. Little continued to train horses and compete, but devoted most of her time in barrel racing to futurities rather than professional racing. In 2017, Little was inducted into the Canadian Pro Rodeo Hall of Fame. Among her many accomplishments, it was noted that she had trained five horses who all qualified for the Canadian Finals Rodeo "in a single year".
