= Lists of rodeo performers =

The following articles contain lists of rodeo performers:

- Bull Riding Hall of Fame
- List of Calgary Stampede Rodeo Champions
- List of Canadian Professional Rodeo Association Champions
- List of Professional Rodeo Cowboys Association Champions
- List of Professional Bull Riders Champions
- List of ProRodeo Hall of Fame inductees
- List of Canadian Pro Rodeo Hall of Fame inductees
- National Cowgirl Museum and Hall of Fame
- PRCA All-Around Champion
- Professional Bull Riders: Heroes and Legends
