= Indians (play) =

1968 play by Arthur Kopit

- Original language: English
- Written by: Arthur Kopit
- Genre: Western

Premiere
- Date: July 1968
- Place: United States

Indians is a 1968 play by Arthur Kopit.

At its core is Buffalo Bill Cody and his Buffalo Bill's Wild West Show. The play examines the contradictions of Cody's life and his work with Native Americans. Alvin Klein, writing in The New York Times, wrote that the play intended "...to open up the real savage story of how the West was won, to demythologize that old game of cowboys and Indians..."

== Productions ==
Indians premiered in London in July 1968 in a production by the Royal Shakespeare Company at the Aldwych Theatre, directed by Jack Gelber. The play had its US premiere at the Arena Stage, Washington, DC., from May 1, 1969 to June 8, 1969, directed by Gene Frankel.

The play opened on Broadway at the Brooks Atkinson Theatre on October 13, 1969. Directed by Gene Frankel, the cast included Stacy Keach as Buffalo Bill, Manu Tupou as Sitting Bull, Tom Aldredge, Kevin Conway, Charles Durning, Raul Julia, and Sam Waterston. The play ran for 96 performances and 16 previews.

The play was presented at the McCarter Theater, Princeton, New Jersey in October 1991, directed by George Faison.

== Adaptation ==
In 1976, Robert Altman wrote and directed a screen adaptation titled Buffalo Bill and the Indians, or Sitting Bull's History Lesson. The cast included Paul Newman, Joel Grey, Kevin McCarthy, Geraldine Chaplin, Denver Pyle, and Harvey Keitel.

== Analysis ==
Michael Patterson, professor of Theater at De Montfort University, Leicester), wrote in The Oxford Guide to Plays that "Kopit turned to a more serious political investigation of the white settlers' treatment of Native Americans... Kopit's play was one of the first major pieces to confront the issue and to relate it to continuing genocide in South-East Asia."

Otis L. Guernsey wrote in Curtain Times: The New York Theatre, 1965-1987 that "the best script of the 1969-70 bests, in our opinion, was Indians, about the opening of the American West... It is destined, certainly, for an illustrious career...where it will enhance the reputation of American playwriting...Indians reached its...fulfillment not in the events on the stage...but out in the auditorium where we were forced to re-examine some of our value judgments through a crack in our beloved national epic of the Old Wild West."

John Lahr of The Village Voice wrote: "Indians deals with the most incendiary truth: myth being created to justify a lost dream."

== Broadway awards and nominations ==
- 1970 Tony Award for Best Play (nominee)
- 1970 Tony Award for Best Actor in a Play (Keach, nominee)
- 1970 Tony Award for Best Lighting Design (nominee)
- 1970 Drama Desk Award for Outstanding Performance (Keach, winner)
- 1970 New York Drama Critics' Circle for Best American Play (nominee)
