= Gina McDougall =

Canadian barrel racer

- Born: Virginia Ann Souther; 25 June 1927; Chicago, Illinois, United States
- Died: 21 May 2014 (aged 86); Cremona, Alberta, Canada
- Other names: Gina Cohoe, Gina McDougall Cohoe
- Occupation(s): Rodeo contestant, rancher, horse trainer, sculptor
- Years active: 1960–2014

Gina McDougall (also known as Gina McDougall Cohoe, 25 June 1927 – 21 May 2014) was a U.S.-born Canadian rodeo cowgirl, rancher, horse trainer, and sculptor. She was a two-time Canadian barrel racing champion in 1962 and 1963. The Calgary Stampede and Red Deer Silver Buckle Rodeo commissioned bronzes from her, and she had pieces in the private collections of Queen Elizabeth, Princess Margaret, and Randy Travis. She was inducted into the Calgary Stampede Western Art Show Hall of Fame in 2007 and the Canadian Pro Rodeo Hall of Fame in 2013.

== Early life ==
Virginia Ann Souther was born on 25 June 1927 in Chicago, Illinois, United States, to Frances Louise (née Merriman) and Norman Gilbert Souther. Her family, which included her brother Jack, immigrated to Canada when Souther was seven years old. She was raised on the Bar C Ranch, near Morley, Alberta. She married Robert Hall McDougall, a rancher and livestock breeder, and the couple had three children: Sally, Robert Jr., and Jean. They ran a ranch and McDougall trained both horses and riders, as well as raising cattle and quarter horses.

== Career ==
McDougall performed on the rodeo circuit for four years, and won back-to-back Canadian barrel racing championships in 1962 and 1963. In 1973, she was commissioned to create a plaque to honor the historic and future participants, including rodeo performers, announcers, and rodeo clowns for the diamond jubilee of the Silver Buckle Rodeo in Red Deer, Alberta. That year, she was also commissioned to create RCMP Musical Ride, a sculpture depicting the famed figure of the Canadian Mountie for Queen Elizabeth II. She was one of eight exhibitors invited to participate in the first art show hosted by the Calgary Stampede in 1977.

For twenty years, the Stampede commissioned McDougall to create their championship trophy bronzes. She was also commissioned by the Alberta Standardbred Horse Association and other stock breeding organizations as a sculptor for their championship trophies. Her preferred medium was bronze and her typical themes were motifs of western culture and horses. Her early works were produced under the name Gina McDougall; after 1975, she worked under the name Gina McDougall Cohoe or Gina Cohoe, following her marriage to Thoroughbred trainer and breeder, Ken Cohoe.

In 2007, at the inaugural induction for the Western Art Show Hall of Fame, Cohoe was honoured along with Malcolm J. MacKenzie, a fellow bronze sculptor from Alberta. In 2013, she was inducted into the Canadian Pro Rodeo Hall of Fame.

== Death and legacy ==
Cohoe died on 21 May 2014 at her ranch in Cremona, Alberta, Canada. She has works in the private collections of the royal family of Jordan, Princess Margaret, Queen Elizabeth, country singer Randy Travis, and Canadian Prime Minister Brian Mulroney.
