= Arthur Kopit =

American playwright (1937–2021)

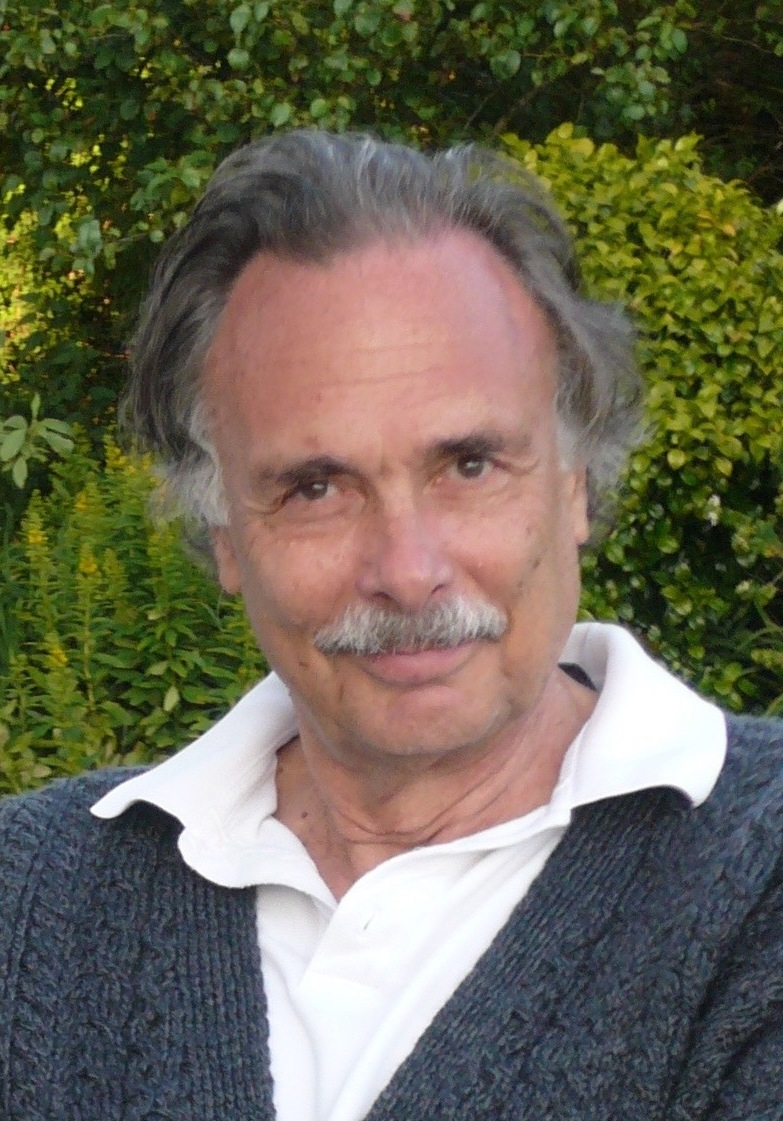
- Kopit in 2011
- Born: Arthur Lee Koenig; May 10, 1937; New York City, U.S.
- Died: April 2, 2021 (aged 83); New York City, U.S.
- Occupation: Playwright
- Years active: 1962–2021
- Spouse: Leslie Garis (m. 1968)
- Children: 3

Arthur Lee Kopit (né Koenig; May 10, 1937 – April 2, 2021) was an American playwright. He was a two-time Pulitzer Prize finalist for Indians and Wings. He was also nominated for three Tony Awards: Best Play for Indians (1970) and Wings (1979), as well as Best Book of a Musical for Nine (1982). He won the Vernon Rice Award (now known as the Drama Desk Award) in 1962 for Oh Dad, Poor Dad, Mamma's Hung You in the Closet and I'm Feelin' So Sad and was nominated for another Drama Desk Award in 1979 for Wings.

== Early life ==
Kopit was born Arthur Lee Koenig in Manhattan on May 10, 1937. His family was of Jewish descent. His father, Henry, worked as an advertising salesman; his mother, Maxine (Dubin), was a millinery model. They divorced when he was two years old. He consequently adopted the surname of his stepfather, George Kopit, after his mother remarried. Kopit was raised in Lawrence, Nassau County, and attended Lawrence High School. He studied engineering at Harvard University, graduating in 1959. Although he intended to go into science or business, his interest in theater was piqued when he enrolled in a modern drama workshop. He started to compose short plays featuring "outlandish" and long-winded titles, which were staged while he was still an undergraduate. He studied with dramatist Robert Chapman, who was the director of Harvard's Loeb Drama Center.

== Career ==
=== Early works ===
After graduating from Harvard, Kopit undertook a graduate fellowship in Europe. It was during this time that he learned of a playwriting contest organized by the university, which he consequently signed up for. He wrote the play — titled Oh Dad, Poor Dad, Mamma's Hung You in the Closet and I'm Feelin' So Sad — in Europe and completed it in five days. He ultimately won the contest with a $250 prize, even though he had dismissed the play's commercial potential. Oh Dad proceeded to run off-Broadway by Jerome Robbins for over a year, touring for 11 weeks, and culminating in a six-week run on Broadway in 1963. It also began a long-standing collaboration with Roger L. Stevens, who participated in the production of all of Kopit's work until 1984, with the sole exception of Nine. Kopit was conferred the Vernon Rice Award and Outer Critics Circle Award for Best New Play in 1962. Five years later, he was awarded a Guggenheim Fellowship in Drama and Performance Art.

Kopit continued his success with a series of one-act plays like The Day the Whores Came Out to Play Tennis, as well as the three-act On the Runway of Life, You Never Know What's Coming Off Next. He was inspired to write Indians (1969) after reading a newspaper article of a shooting incident in Saigon. The play first opened in London to mixed reviews, before moving to Broadway. While Clive Barnes described the latter production in The New York Times as "a gentle triumph" and complimented Kopit for attempting a "multilinear epic", his colleague Walter Kerr likened it to "bad burlesque". John Lahr considered Indians to be the "most probing and the most totally theatrical Broadway play of this decade". The play was nominated for three Tony Awards (including for best play), in addition to a Pulitzer Prize for Drama nomination, but ran for only 96 performances. Kopit received $250,000 for the film rights.

=== Wings and Nine ===
Kopit relocated to Vermont in the early 1970s. He ventured into incorporating the carnival aspects of avant-garde theater from the previous decade into plays. He went on to teach at Wesleyan University around 1975. There, he wrote an improvisatory pageant lasting an entire day for the United States Bicentennial titled Lewis and Clark: Lost and Found. However, it came to nothing after the producer failed to raise the necessary funds. During this time, Kopit also created play cycles starting with "The Discovery of America". This was regarded by his friends as his "most imaginative work".

After a nine-year hiatus from writing plays, Kopit produced Wings (1978). He was inspired by the recovery experience of his stepfather, who suffered a stroke in 1976 that left him unable to speak. The play debuted at The Public Theater, before shifting to Broadway the following year, where it ran for three months. It received three Tony nominations, with Constance Cummings (who played the main character) winning best actress. She also won a Drama Desk Award for Outstanding Actress in a Play and an Obie Award for her performance. The play was a finalist for the Pulitzer Prize, marking the second time Kopit's work was nominated for the award.

Kopit worked with Maury Yeston on the musical Nine (1982), which was based on the film 8½ by Federico Fellini. Kopit was responsible for authoring the musical's book, which consisted of the dialogue and parts that were not sung. He revised it up to the time of its debut on Broadway, where it ran for nearly two years. He received his third and final Tony nomination, this time for best book of a musical.

Kopit's subsequent plays garnered much promotion now that he was a well-known writer, but were not as successful. For instance, End of the World (1984) lasted only four weeks on Broadway, before running at the Rainbow Theater in Norwalk State Technical College. He collaborated again with Yeston for Phantom, starting in 1983. However, investors withdrew from the Kopit–Yeston venture when The Phantom of the Opera by Andrew Lloyd Webber debuted at the West End in 1986 and on Broadway two years later. The two persisted nonetheless, and Phantom was released as a television mini-series in 1990, before having its stage premiere in Houston one year later. Kopit also produced an NBC police procedural titled "Hands of a Stranger" in 1987. He later wrote Road to Nirvana and Success, both of which debuted in 1991.

=== Later years ===
Kopit's last Broadway credit came in 1998 with High Society, which was based on The Philadelphia Story. His play Y2K premiered the following year off-Broadway. He soon retitled it Because He Can after the predicted eponymous problems did not take place. He donated his papers to the Fales Library at New York University in 2005. He taught at Yale University and the City College of New York throughout his career.

Nine returned to Broadway in 2003, with Antonio Banderas as Guido. It ended up winning two Tony Awards, including best revival of a musical. Rob Marshall later directed the film Nine in 2009 based on Kopit's script. The principal cast consisted of Daniel Day-Lewis, Judi Dench, Nicole Kidman, Marion Cotillard, Penélope Cruz, Sophia Loren, Kate Hudson, and Fergie. Kopit was inducted into the American Theater Hall of Fame in 2017.

== Personal life ==
Kopit married Leslie Garis in 1968. They remained married for 53 years until his death. Together, they had three children.

Kopit died on April 2, 2021, at his home in Manhattan. He was 83 and suffered from progressive Lewy body dementia prior to his death.

== Works ==
- Oh Dad, Poor Dad, Mamma's Hung You in the Closet and I'm Feelin' So Sad (1963)
- Chamber Music (1965) — published in the collection Chamber Music and Other Plays including Chamber music, The questioning of Nick, Sing to me through open windows, The hero, The conquest of Everest, The Day the Whores Came Out to Play Tennis
- Indians (1969), simultaneously a review of America's treatment of Native Americans and a critique of the Vietnam War; inspired the 1976 film by Robert Altman, Buffalo Bill and the Indians, or Sitting Bull's History Lesson.
- Wings (1978), the story of a stroke victim's recovery
- Nine (1982), an adaptation of Federico Fellini's film 8½
- Good Help is Hard to Find (1982)
- End of the World with Symposium to Follow (1984), a mordant investigation of the arms race and nuclear destruction.
- Road to Nirvana (1991)
- Success (published in Plays in One Act, Ecco Press, 1991)
- Phantom (1992), a musical version of The Phantom of the Opera by Gaston Leroux. Music and Lyrics by Maury Yeston.
- High Society (Broadway musical, 1998)
- Y2K (2000) — subsequently published under the title Because He Can
