= Naples, Utah =

City in Utah, United States

- Fifth Class City
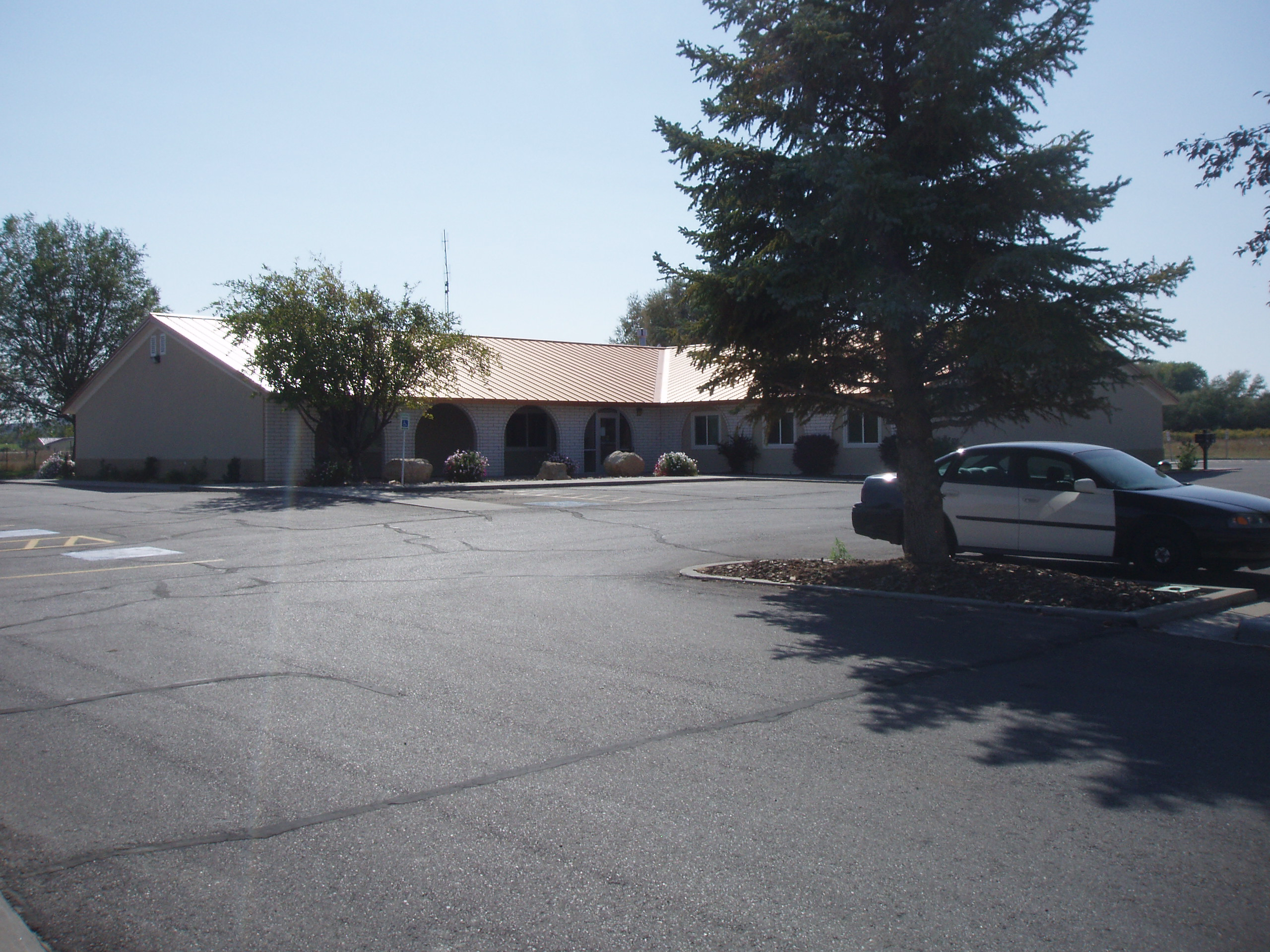
- City office

- Location in Uintah County and the state of Utah
- Coordinates: 40°25′45″N 109°29′49″W
- Country: United States
- State: Utah
- County: Uintah
- Founded: 1878
- Incorporated: 13 May 1982
- Founder: Bradford R. Bird
- Named for: Naples

Government
  - Type: Mayor/Council

Area
  - Total: 6.60 sq mi (17.1 km^{2})
  - Land: 6.60 sq mi (17.1 km^{2})
  - Water: 0.00 sq mi (0 km^{2})
- Elevation: 5,187 ft (1,581 m)

Population (2020)
  - Total: 2,280
  - Density: 315.41/sq mi (121.78/km^{2})
- Time zone: UTC-7 (Mountain (MST))
  - Summer (DST): UTC-6 (MDT)
- ZIP code: 84078 (Vernal, Utah)
- Area code: 435
- FIPS code: 49-53560
- GNIS feature ID: 2411212
- Website: naplescityut.gov

Naples is a city in Uintah County, Utah, United States. The population was 2,282 at the 2020 United States Census. Naples was listed as a town in 2000; it has since been classified as a fifth-class city by state law.

== Geography ==
According to the United States Census Bureau, the city has a total area of 6.5 square miles (16.9 km^{2}), all land.

== Demographics ==
Historical population
Census	Pop.	Note	%±
1890	212		—
1900	779		267.5%
1910	769		−1.3%
1920	605		−21.3%
1930	518		−14.4%
1940	620		19.7%
1950	608		−1.9%
1990	1,334		—
2000	1,300		−2.5%
2010	1,755		35.0%
2020	2,280		29.9%
Source: US Census Bureau

=== 2020 census ===
As of the 2020 census, Naples had a population of 2,280. The median age was 31.7 years. 35.7% of residents were under the age of 18 and 10.4% of residents were 65 years of age or older. For every 100 females there were 96.9 males, and for every 100 females age 18 and over there were 98.2 males age 18 and over.

76.2% of residents lived in urban areas, while 23.8% lived in rural areas.

There were 691 households in Naples, of which 49.8% had children under the age of 18 living in them. Of all households, 69.9% were married-couple households, 10.1% were households with a male householder and no spouse or partner present, and 14.3% were households with a female householder and no spouse or partner present. About 12.0% of all households were made up of individuals and 3.8% had someone living alone who was 65 years of age or older.

There were 737 housing units, of which 6.2% were vacant. The homeowner vacancy rate was 2.1% and the rental vacancy rate was 9.8%.

Racial composition as of the 2020 census
Race	Number	Percent
White	2,055	90.1%
Black or African American	0	0.0%
American Indian and Alaska Native	22	1.0%
Asian	9	0.4%
Native Hawaiian and Other Pacific Islander	7	0.3%
Some other race	35	1.5%
Two or more races	152	6.7%
Hispanic or Latino (of any race)	161	7.1%

== Attractions ==
Games, Anime, and More is a biannual fan convention. It is a multi-genre convention having video games, card games, cartoons, costumes, tournaments, tabletop gaming, and similar activities. The GAM Convention is held during March and August in Uintah County, Utah. In 2015 it was the first anime convention held in Vernal, Utah as well as the first gaming convention held there, making it the first convention of its type in Vernal. In 2016 it was held in Naples, making GAM the first convention of its type in the city of Naples.

== Notable people ==
- Earl W. Bascom (1906–1995), Hollywood actor, artist, inventor, rodeo cowboy dubbed "Father of Modern Rodeo"
