= Cowboy Hill =

Coordinates: 36°36′24″N 97°08′17″W

Cowboy Hill is an Oklahoma Historic Site located on a bluff overlooking the Salt Fork of the Arkansas river in Kay County, Oklahoma. Zack Miller, owner of the famed 101 Ranch, gave the land to the Cherokee Strip Cowpunchers Association in 1930 for use as long as they needed it. Zack Miller and Jack Webb, one of the famous trick-shooters with the 101 Ranch Wild West Show, are buried in the Cowboy Hill Cemetery located on the site.

In 1959, Cowboy Hill was deeded to the Oklahoma Historical Society. The Historical Society, in 1978, would give the deed to the 101 Ranch Restoration Foundation.

The Cherokee Strip Cowpunchers Association, organized in 1920, was open to those who had worked as cowboys on the ranches in the Cherokee Strip before 1893, the year the Strip was open for settlement. The association numbered about 400 members near the beginning. The wives of the members were eligible to join the Ladies Auxiliary. Joe Miller was elected perpetual president in 1921. The association's official publication, the 101 Magazine, was "dedicated to old-timers and to young people—and to those who love the Great Southwest and the Greater Outdoors."
