= Tom Three Persons =

Niistapi rodeo athlete (b. 1888, d. 1949)

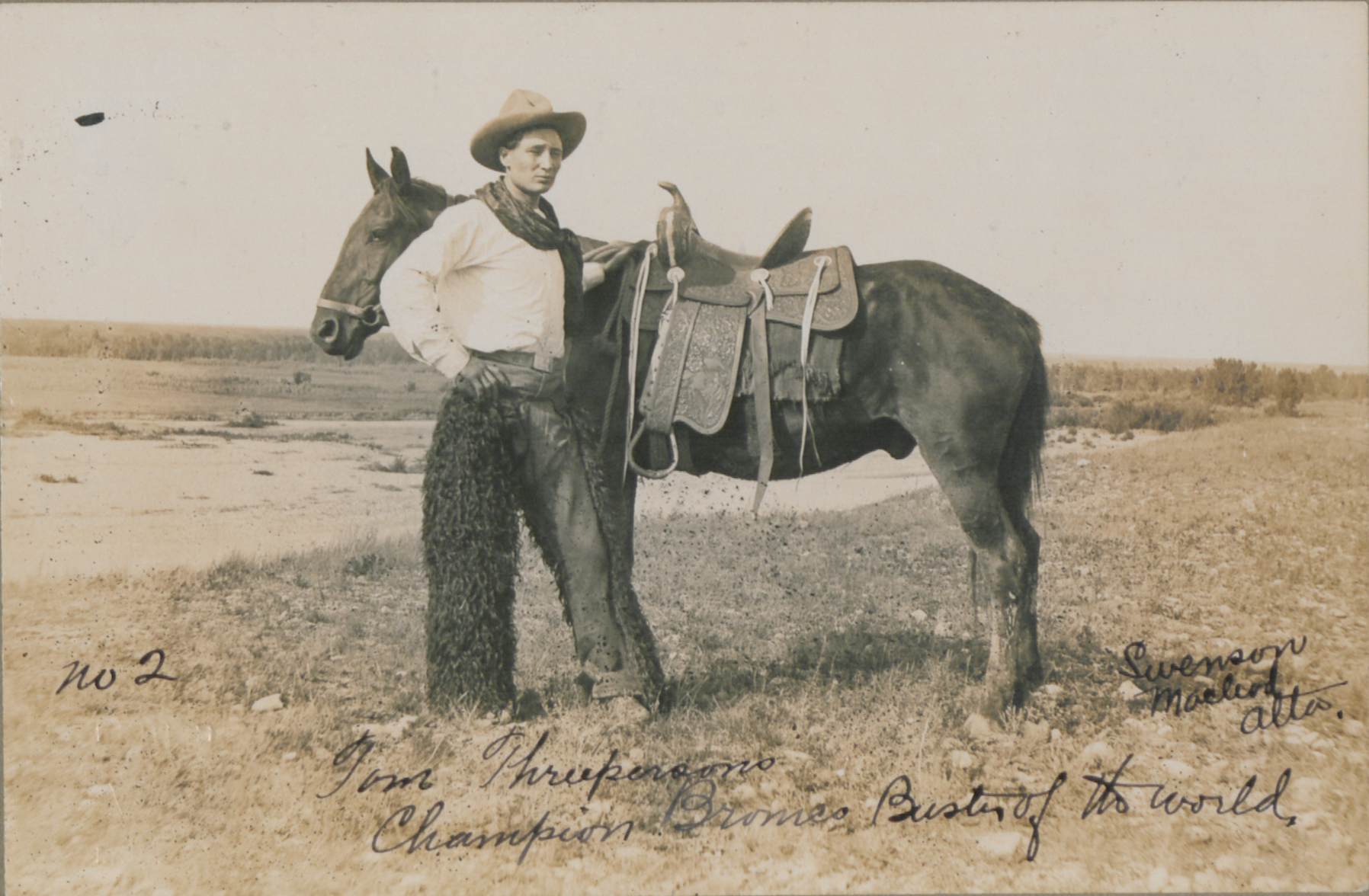
Tom Three Persons in 1912

Tom Three Persons (March 19, 1888 – August 13, 1949) was a Niitsitapi (Blackfoot Confederacy) rodeo athlete and rancher and a member of the Kainai Nation (Blood). Best known for winning the saddle bronc competition at the inaugural Calgary Stampede in 1912. An Indigenous athlete, he was the only Canadian to win a championship at this historic rodeo competition.

== Early life ==
Tom Three Persons was born on March 19, 1888, to Double Talker (Ayakonhtseniki) a Kainai (Blood) woman, and Fred Pace, a white trader and bootlegger. He was raised on the Blood Reservation after he was adopted by his mother's Kainai husband. This assured his’ ‘Indian’ status. The Blood Reserve was his childhood home. He lived there until he ‘enrolled’ in St. Joseph's Indian Industrial School, a Catholic boarding school, in May 1903. Following his release from residential school in 1906 Three Persons set about his dual careers as a rodeo athlete and rancher/cowboy.

== Rodeo achievements ==
Guy Weadick, the promoter of the first Calgary Stampede, sought to secure the best cowboys for the rodeo events. After contacting Blood Reserve Indian Agent W.J. Hyde, the Indian Agent wrote to Weadick endorsing Three Persons’ entry in the two bucking horse contests. Three Persons won the saddle bronc contest by overcoming the previously un-ridden Cyclone, winning $1000, a saddle, and a gold belt buckle. An injury prevented him from defending his title at the 1913 Winnipeg Stampede.

Although he remained active in local rodeos such as the Gleichen (Alberta) Stampede in 1914, and the 1918 Lethbridge Stampede, Three Persons never regained his Calgary form. Through the 1920s and 1930s, he remained involved in rodeo as an organizer and judge.

== Ranching ==
Tom Three Persons, although living under the restrictive Canadian laws governing Indigenous peoples, was well known in southern Alberta as a rancher on the Blood Reserve. He raised cattle and horses and farmed grain. By the late 1930s, he was reported to own over 200 head of Hereford cattle. He left an estate estimated to be worth $100,000. Obituaries focused on his rodeo accomplishment at the 1912 Calgary Stampede. In 1983, he was inducted into the Canadian Pro Rodeo Hall of Fame. In 2007, he was inducted into the National Multicultural Western Heritage Museum. In 2024 he was inducted into the Alberta Sports Hall of Fame as a Rodeo Pioneer.
