= Reg Kesler =

American rodeo cowboy (1919-2001)

- Born: October 16, 1919; Lethbridge, Alberta, Canada
- Died: May 16, 2001 (aged 81); Stirling, Alberta, Canada
- Occupations: Cowboy, stock contractor, pick-up man, outrider

Reg Kesler (October 16, 1919 – May 16, 2001) began his rodeo career at the age of 14 at the Raymond Stampede, competing in the boys steer riding. At the time, it was common for cowboys to compete in many or even all the rodeo events, and Kesler was no exception as he grew into his rodeo career. He participated in all five major rodeo events of the time: saddle bronc riding, bareback riding, bull riding, tie-down roping and steer decorating, a precursor to steer wrestling. Kesler especially excelled in the roughstock events, namely saddle bronc riding and bareback riding, appearing in the top four in the Canadian standings in those events six times. He was also a successful competitor in the wild cow milking and wild horse racing, an outrider in the chuckwagon racing, and a well-known pick-up man. Kesler was a ProRodeo Hall of Fame and Canadian Pro Rodeo Hall of Fame inductee.

Kesler's first appearance in the record books was in 1948 when he was named Canadian All-Around Champion, winning a total of $1,960 and the first trophy saddle awarded by the Cowboys' Protective Association (CPA), the organization that eventually evolved into today's Canadian Professional Rodeo Association (CPRA).

He earned the Canadian All-Around title again in both 1951 and 1953. He was crowned All-Around champion at the Calgary Stampede in 1949 and 1950, and won the wild cow milking championship at "The Greatest Outdoor Show on Earth" three times.

Although Kesler had started his own ranching operation in 1943, where he raised cattle, his journeys along the rodeo trail inspired the next stage of his career, and what he would ultimately be best known for.

In the 1950s, due to the growing demand for bucking horses, Kesler set up a string of rough stock and became a stock contractor and rodeo producer. He supplied stock to rodeos and events across Canada, including the 1967 World Exposition in Montreal, the same year he officially retired from competition, and a number of rodeos across the United States.

Kesler has been recognized a number of times for the contributions he made to the sport of rodeo during his lifetime. Of them, the highest honor is the ProRodeo Hall of Fame in Colorado Springs, Colorado, which inducted Kesler in 1992 for his contribution as a stock contractor. In 1989, Kesler was inducted into the Canadian Pro Rodeo Hall of Fame.

== Honors ==
- 1989 Canadian Pro Rodeo Hall of Fame
- 1990 Alberta Sports Hall of Fame
- 1992 ProRodeo Hall of Fame
- 2008 Texas Rodeo Cowboy Hall of Fame
- 2009 Rodeo Hall of Fame of the National Cowboy and Western Heritage Museum
- Montana Pro Rodeo Hall and Wall of Fame

== See also ==
- Cowboy
