= Herman Linder =

American bronc rider

Herman Linder was a Canadian rancher, rodeo competitor, and rodeo promoter.

Linder was born in the United States in Darlington, Wisconsin on 5 August 1907 to a circus performer who had emigrated from Switzerland. The family later moved to Cardston, Alberta, Canada, where the young Linder began to ride young steers and unbroken horses for amusement. He and his brother, Warner, soon took to rodeoing. The first time he competed at the Calgary Stampede, Linder won the Canadian championships for both the saddle bronc and bareback bronc riding. He soon began to dominate the sport, becoming known as "King of the Cowboys" in the 1930s, winning the Canadian all-round championship seven times, and the North American championship five times in a row.

In 1936, Linder joined 60 other cowboys in staging a rodeo cowboy strike at the Boston Garden. This action led to the birth of the Professional Rodeo Cowboys Association. Later, he was involved in the foundation of the Canadian Professional Rodeo Association. Following his retirement as a competing cowboy, Linder produced rodeo competitions, including one presented at Expo 67 in Montréal, Quebec.

Linder became a member of the (American) National Cowboy Hall of Fame in 1980. He was inducted into the Rodeo Hall of Fame of the National Cowboy and Western Heritage Museum in 1955 when it opened. He was made an honorary chief of the Blood Indians. In 1982, he was inducted into the Canadian Pro Rodeo Hall of Fame.

He died in Cardston, Alberta, on 18 January 2001.
