= Milk River Ridge =

Ridge in Alberta, Canada

Coordinates: 49°15′N 112°30′W

The Milk River Ridge is a high, flat ridge in southwestern Alberta, Canada. It is about 2,700 square kilometers (1,000 sq mi) in area. Its plateau is about 1,219 meters (4,023 feet) above sea level - which is about 274 meters (904 feet) higher than Lethbridge to its north. The Milk River flows through the plateau.

The ridge was formed thousands of years ago as the glaciers that once covered Canada retreated. The area was one of the few parts of Canada to not be overrun by the glaciers during the last ice age.

Because of its height, it can be especially windy on the plateau - especially when the Chinook blows in. Though rare, it is also not unheard of to have snow in the summer. Two summer snowfalls of note in recent years are August 21–23, 1992 (up to three feet), and July 15, 1999 (at least one foot).

The rolling grasslands provide habitat for mule deer, pronghorn, white-tailed deer, yellow-bellied marmot and birds of prey such as ferruginous hawk, golden eagle and prairie falcon.
