= Ray Knight (rodeo organizer) =

Canadian rancher

- Born: Oscar Raymond Knight; 8 April 1872; Payson, Utah Territory
- Died: 7 February 1947 (aged 74); Raymond, Alberta, Canada
- Occupation: Rancher
- Spouses: Hannah Isabelle Smith (m. 1894; died 1906) Charlotte Maud Heninger (m. 1907)
- Children: Uarda, Raymond, Kenneth, LeRoy and Lalla (first marriage); Owen, Wayne, Jesse, Charlotte, Miles, Chance and Mary (second marriage)
- Relatives: Inez Knight Allen (sister)

Oscar Raymond Knight (8 April 1872 – 7 February 1947) was a gold and silver miner, cattle rancher, large scale farmer, bank executive, industrialist, railroad executive, rodeo producer, rodeo stock contractor and rodeo champion. He was one of the Canadian Cattle Barons and considered one of the wealthiest cattlemen in the world.

He went by his middle name of Raymond and was known by most informally as Ray.

The first son and second child of six children of Utah mining magnate Jesse Knight and his wife Amanda McEwan, Ray Knight was born in Payson, Utah Territory and raised there on the family ranch as well as at their winter home in Provo.

Ray Knight attended school at the Brigham Young Academy, now Brigham Young University, in Provo.

In 1894, he married Provo school teacher Isabelle Smith. Five children, three sons and two daughters, came from this marriage: Uarda, Raymond, Kenneth, LeRoy and Lalla. The first three children lived to adulthood.

Born and raised a cowboy, Ray Knight was considered a top hand. Jim Meeks, who cowboyed with Ray Knight in Southern Utah, said, "Ray was...the best all-around cowboy on the roundup on Boulder Mountain."

Ray Knight was a rodeo producer and rodeo champion steer roper in Utah, winning his first roping championship in Salt Lake City in 1897 creating "The Cowboy Challenge" competing for the Interstate Championship and vying for the world's championship.

Ray worked in partnership with his younger brother, Jesse William "Will" Knight, and their father in his various business undertakings, including ranching, cattle buying and mining.

In 1896, their mining operations paid off as their Humbug Mine became one of the richest producers of silver and lead ores in the Tintic Mining District in Juab County. The location of the rich ore deposits of the Humbug Mine was discovered after Jesse Knight followed the promptings of a dream.

The Knight family business and ranching operations quickly expanded to some 80 corporations, including the Knight Investment Company and the Knight Bank, on all of which Ray Knight served as a board member.

From 1897 to 1899, Ray lived in England serving a full-time proselytizing mission for the Church of Jesus Christ of Latter-day Saints, where his sister Inez was also serving.

1900, Ray Knight chosen as a delegate by Utah County Commissioners to attend the National livestock in Salt Lake City.

In 1900, Ray Knight entered the world of politics as a regional and state delegate for the Democratic Party.

In 1901, a year after returning from England, Ray and his brother Will were sent by their father to southern Alberta, Canada to survey the possibility of buying land to expand their ranching operations.

Knight instituted the Raymond Stampede, the oldest and longest-running rodeo in Canada and is considered the first rodeo stock contractor.

Ray Knight and Ad Day formed the Knight and Day Stampede Company.

Notably, Knight was closely involved in the establishment and settlement of Raymond, Alberta, a town named in his honor by his father.

While living in Raymond, Knight managed his father's ranch, which consisted of approximately 400,000 acres (1,600 km^{2}) of land stocked with over 15,000 head of cattle and 40,000 head of sheep. Knight held many honours and trophies for his skill in calf and steer roping. In 1902, Knight organized the first Raymond Stampede, the first organized rodeo to be held in Canada. At the inaugural event, Knight himself took first prize in the steer roping competition.

In 1904, Ray won the steer roping championship at the Cardston Stampede.

Being innovative, Ray Knight had a 40 mile telephone line installed to the ranch headquarters, following the top wire of the ranch fence line.

In September 1906, Ray's wife Isabelle, having been sick for sometime, died in Provo, Utah

October 1906, Ray purchased a house in Salt Lake City at 627 S. 700 E.

In 1907, Ray Knight married school teacher Charlotte Maud Heninger of Raymond, Alberta, and had five children: Owen, Wayne, Jesse, Charlotte, and Mary.

1920, furnished rodeo stock to the Browning Stampede and place second in the day money for the calf roping event.

1921, Ray Knight was made president of the Knight Investment Corporation, replacing his father who officially retired, overseeing its many ranching and industrial concerns, including operating gold, silver and coal mines in Utah and Nevada, sheep ranches and woolen mills, wheat and sugar beet farms, grain elevators, sugar factories, railroad lines of the Utah Pacific Railway Company and cattle ranching operations in southern and northern Alberta, Utah, Texas, Kansas, Nebraska and Columbia, South American.

1947, Ray Knight died in Magrath, Alberta having suffered for some years from a stroke he had in 1943.

Ray, Jesse, Will honored for their contributions to the development of Canada.

== Honors ==
- 1982 Canadian Pro Rodeo Hall of Fame
- Lethbridge Sports Hall of Fame
- Raymond Sports Hall of Fame
- Alberta Sports Hall of Fame
- Canadian Trick Riding Hall of Fame

== Legacy ==
Knight has been called the "Father of Canadian Stampedes", the "Father of Canadian Professional Rodeo" and the "Father of Canadian Calf Roping."

== See also ==
- Inez Knight Allen, sister
