= Canadian Pro Rodeo Hall of Fame =

Hall of fame in Ponoka, Alberta, Canada

Coordinates: 52.666°N 113.601°W

- Sport: Rodeo
- Founded: 1979
- Countries: Canada
- Website: Canadian Pro Rodeo Hall of Fame

The Canadian Pro Rodeo Hall of Fame (CPRHF) was founded in 1979 to honour and distinguish outstanding contestants, builders, and animals in the Canadian rodeo arena. Inductees are qualified by the Canadian Rodeo Historical Association.

The CPRHF, located at the Calnash Ag Events Centre in Ponoka, Alberta, displays artifacts of the history of professional rodeo in Canada. There are currently 203 inductees in the Canadian Pro Rodeo Hall of Fame since the 2019 inductees added eight new members.
