= Edgar =

Male given name and family name

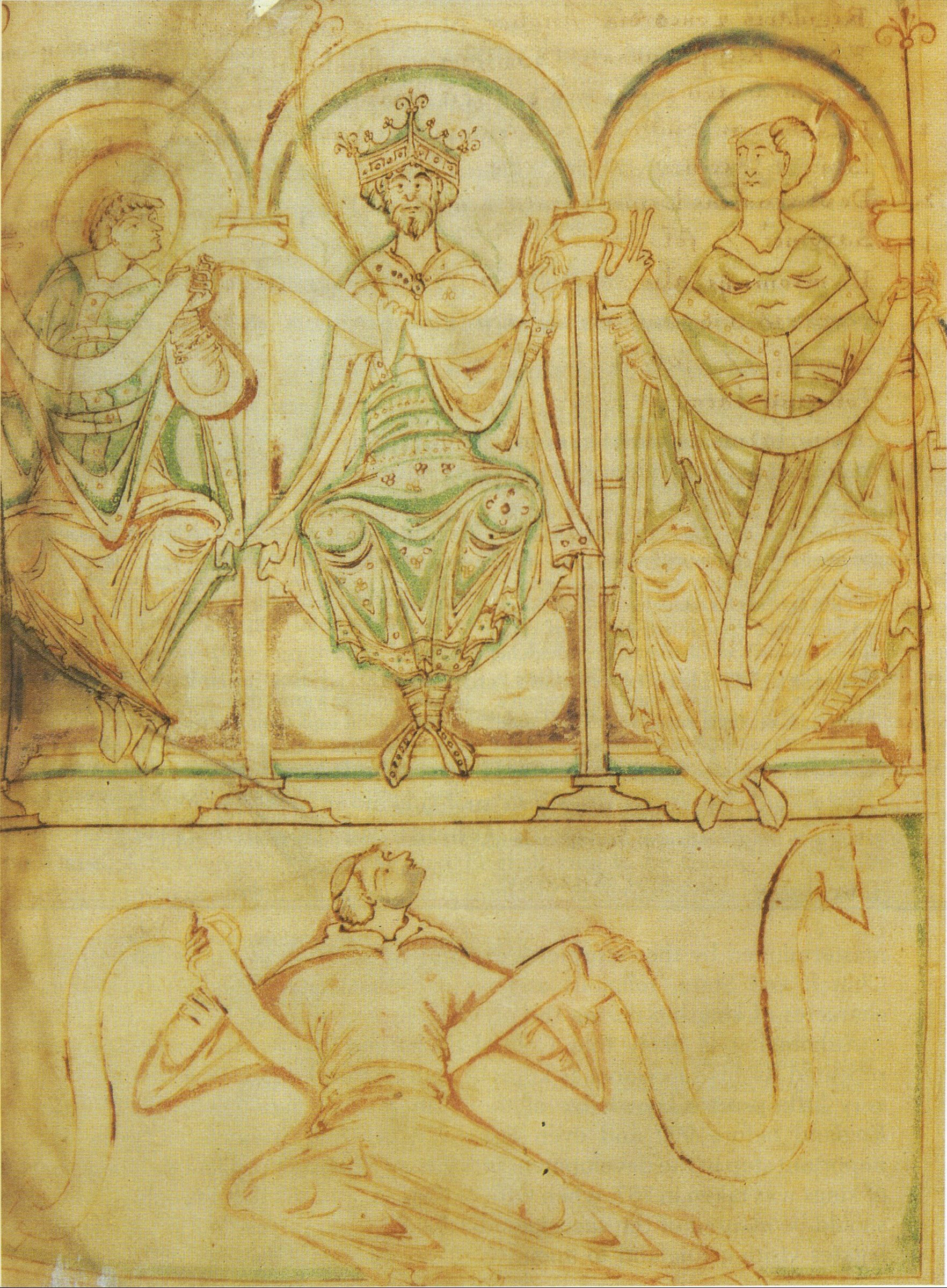
King Edgar seated between St. Æthelwold, Bishop of Winchester, and St. Dunstan, Archbishop of Canterbury. From an eleventh-century manuscript of the Regularis Concordia. British Library MS Cotton Tiberius A iii.

Edgar is a commonly used masculine English given name, from an Anglo-Saxon name Edgar (composed of ead "rich, prosperous" and gar "spear"). Like most Anglo-Saxon names, it fell out of use by the Late Middle Ages; it was, however, revived in the 18th century, and was popularised by its use for a character in Sir Walter Scott's The Bride of Lammermoor (1819). The name was more common in the United States than elsewhere in the Anglosphere during the 19th century. It has been a particularly fashionable name in Latin American countries since the 20th century.

== People with the given name ==
- Edgar, King of England (942–975)
- Edgar the Ætheling (c. 1051 – c. 1126), last member of the Anglo-Saxon royal house of England
- Edgar, King of Scotland (1074–1107)
- Edgar Alaffita (born 1996), Mexican footballer
- Edgar Allan (disambiguation), multiple people
- Edgar Allen (disambiguation), multiple people
- Edgar Bacon (disambiguation), multiple people
- Edgar Barrier (1907–1964), American actor
- Edgar Baumann (born 1970), Paraguayan javelin thrower
- Edgar Bergen (1903–1978), American actor, radio performer, ventriloquist
- Edgar Berlanga (born 1997), American boxer
- Edgar Bogardus (1927–1958), American poet
- Edgar Bronfman Sr. (1929–2013), American-Canadian businessman
- Edgar H. Brown (1926–2021), American mathematician
- Edgar Buchanan (1903–1979), American actor
- Edgar Rice Burroughs (1875–1950), American author, creator of Tarzan
- Edgar Cantero (born 1981), Spanish author in Catalan, Spanish, and English languages, author of The Supernatural Enhancements
- Edgar Cayce (1877–1945), American psychic and healer
- Edgar Chadwick (1869–1942), English footballer and manager
- Edgar Cheung (born 1997), Hong Kong foil fencer and Olympic champion
- Edgar F. Codd (1923–2003), British computer scientist
- Edgar A. Cohen (1859–1939), American photographer
- Edgar Contreras (disambiguation), several people
- Edgar Davids (born 1973), Dutch footballer
- Edgar Degas (1834–1917), French painter
- Edgar Durazo (born 1991), Mexican bull rider
- Edgar Eather (1886–1968), American judge, Justice of the Supreme Court of Nevada
- Edgar Endress (born 1970), Chilean artist
- Edgar Feuchtwanger (1924–2025), German-British historian
- Édgar Fonseca (born 1981), Colombian road cyclist
- Edgar Froese (1944–2015), German musician
- Edgar Fuller, American mathematician
- Édgar González (disambiguation), multiple people
- Edgar J. Goodrich (1896–1969), judge of the United States Board of Tax Appeals
- Edgar Grospiron (born 1969), French freestyle skier and Olympic champion
- Edgar A. Guest (1881–1959), American poet
- Edgar Hartung (born 1956), West German sprint canoer
- Edgar N. Harwood (1854–1936), American judge, Justice of the Montana Supreme Court
- Edgar Haynes (1866–1923), American Christian evangelist
- Edgar Hilsenrath (1926–2018), German Jewish writer and Holocaust survivor
- Edgar Ilarde (1934–2020), Filipino politician and host
- Edgar P. Jacobs (1904–1987), Belgian comic book creator
- Edgar Johan Kuusik (1888–1974), Estonian architect and interior designer
- Edgar Lacy (1944–2011), American basketball player
- Edgar Lungu (1956–2025), 6th Republican President of Zambia (2015–2021)
- Edgar Maalouf (1934–2018), Lebanese politician
- Edgar Martínez (born 1963), Puerto Rican baseball player in American Major League Baseball
- Edgar McFadden (1891–1956), American farmer and plant breeder
- Edgar Meddings (1923–2020), British bobsledder
- Edgar Meyer (born 1960), American bassist
- Edgar Middleton (1894–1939), British playwright and author
- Edgar Mitchell (1930–2016), American astronaut
- Edgar Mittelholzer (1909–1965), Guyanese novelist
- Edgar Morais (born 1989), Portuguese actor and director
- Edgar Morin (1921–2026), French philosopher and sociologist
- Midwxst (born 2003, Edgar Nathaniel Sarratt III), American musician
- Edgar Norton (1868–1953), English-American actor
- Edgar Wilson Nye (1850–1896), American humorist
- Edgar Oliver (born 1956), American performance artist and playwright
- Edgar Pêra (born 1960), Portuguese cinematographer
- Édgar Ponce (1974–2005), Mexican actor and dancer
- Edgar Prado (born 1967), Peruvian-born American jockey
- Edgar Puusepp (1911–1982), Estonian wrestler
- Edgar Rădulescu (1890–1977), Romanian general
- Édgar Ramírez (born 1977), Venezuelan actor
- Edgar E. Rand (c. 1905–1955), American business executive
- Edgar Nelson Rhodes (1877–1942), Canadian politician
- Édgar Humberto Ruiz (born 1971), Colombian road cyclist
- Edgar V. Saks (1910–1984), Estonian historian and author
- Edgar Savisaar (1950–2022), Estonian politician (Keskerakond)
- Edgar Selge (born 1948), German actor and writer
- Edgar Seligman (1867–1958), American-born British fencer
- Edgar Sengier (1879–1963), Belgium director of the Union Minière du Haut Katanga during World War II
- Edgar A. Stubenrauch (1894–1988), American architect
- Edgar Varèse (1883–1965), French composer
- Édgar Velásquez (born 1974), Venezuelan boxer
- Edgar Veytia, Mexican state attorney general
- Édgar Vivar (born 1948), Mexican actor and comedian
- Edgar Wachenheim III, American investor
- Edgar Wallace (1875–1932), English writer
- Edgar Wells (1908–1995), Methodist missionary in northern Australia
- Edgar W. Wells, 19th century American designer and architect for Klieves, Kraft & Company
- Edgar Winter (born 1946), American musician
- Edgar Wright (born 1974), British film director
- Edgar Yaeger (1904–1997), American artist
- Edgar Clarke (2013)

== Fictional characters with the given name ==
- Edgar Balthazar, the butler from the 1970 Disney animated film The Aristocats
- Edgar Bones, in the Harry Potter series of novels by J. K. Rowling
- Edgar Friendly, an underground rebel leader in the 1993 film Demolition Man
- Edgar Linton, a leading character from Wuthering Heights by Emily Brontë
- Edgar Roni Figaro, in the video game Final Fantasy VI
- Edgar Stiles, in the television series 24

== People with the surname ==
- Barrie Edgar (1919–2012), English television producer
- Bruce Edgar (born 1956), New Zealand cricketer
- Campbell Cowan Edgar (1870–1938), Scottish Egyptologist and Secretary-General of the Egyptian Museum at Cairo
- Dave Edgar (footballer, born 1902), Scottish footballer
- David Edgar (soccer, born 1987) (born 1987), Canadian soccer player
- David Edgar (playwright) (born 1948), English playwright
- David Edgar (swimmer) (born 1950), American swimmer
- Don Edgar (born 1936), Australian sociologist
- Elizabeth Edgar (1929–2019), New Zealand botanist
- Fiona Edgar, New Zealand professor of management
- Frankie Edgar (born 1981), American mixed martial arts fighter
- George Edgar (academic) (1837–1913), American university president
- Irene Edgar (born 1957), Scottish lawn bowler
- James David Edgar (1841–1899), Canadian politician
- James Edgar (entrepreneur) (1843–1909), Scottish-American founder of Edgar Department Stores and the first department store Santa Claus
- James Douglas Edgar (1884–1921), English professional golfer
- Jim Edgar (1946–2025), American politician and Governor of Illinois
- Jimmy Edgar (born 1983), American electronic music artist
- John Edgar (disambiguation), several people
- Jon Edgar (born 1968), British sculptor
- Jonny Edgar (born 2004), British racing driver
- Kika Edgar (born 1985), Mexican actress and singer
- Marjorie Edgar (1889–1960), American folklorist, Girl Scout leader
- Marriott Edgar (1880–1951), British poet
- Matt Edgar (born 1986), English darts player
- Robert Allan Edgar (born 1940), U.S. federal judge
- Robert W. Edgar (1943–2013), American politician
- Ross Edgar (born 1983), British track cyclist
- Ryerson Edgar (born 2009), Canadian ice hockey player
- Scott Edgar (basketball) (born 1955), American basketball coach
- Thomas Edgar (MP) (by 1508–1547), English politician
- Thomas Edgar (volleyball) (born 1989), Australian volleyball player
- Thomas F. Edgar, American chemical engineer
- Troy Edgar, American security official
- William Edgar (disambiguation), several people

== Fictional characters with the surname ==
- Judge Edgar, in the Judge Dredd comic strip
- Stan Edgar, in the television series The Boys and The Boys Presents: Diabolical
- Nadia Edgar / Victoria "Vic the Veep" Neuman, in the television series The Boys and Gen V

== See also ==
- J. Edgar Hoover (1895–1972), former head of the U.S. Federal Bureau of Investigation
- Edgars (name), the Latvian language cognate of the English name
- Edgaras, the Lithuanian language cognate of the English name
- Edgardo, the Italian language cognate of Edgar
- Edgar, hairstyle associated with Latino culture
