= Durazo =

Durazo is a surname. Notable people with the surname include:

- Alfonso Durazo (born 1954), Mexican politician
- Arturo Durazo Moreno (1924–2000), Mexican police chief
- Edgar Durazo (born 1991), Mexican bull rider
- Erubiel Durazo (born 1975), Mexican baseball player
- María Elena Durazo (born 1953), American politician
