= John Edgar =

John Edgar may refer to:

- John Edgar (politician) (1750–1832), Irish-American pioneer and politician
- John Edgar (minister) (1798–1866), Presbyterian minister, professor of theology, and moderator of the Presbyterian Church of Ireland
- John George Edgar (1834–1864), writer
- John Edgar (English footballer) (1930–2006), English football midfielder for Bishop Auckland and Darlington in 1950s
- John Edgar (Scottish footballer), Scottish football forward for Arsenal, Aberdeen and others in 1910s
- John Ware Edgar (1839–1902), British colonial administrator in British India
- Johnny Edgar (1936–2008), English football forward for Hartlepools United, Gillingham, York City, and others in 1950s/1960s
- John Edgar (sculptor), New Zealand artist

== See also ==
- Jon Edgar (born 1968), British artist
