= David Edgar =

David or Dave Edgar may refer to:

- Dave Edgar (footballer, born 1902) (1902–1976), Scottish footballer
- David Edgar (playwright) (born 1948), English playwright
- David Edgar (swimmer) (born 1950), American swimmer
- David Edgar (soccer, born 1987), Canadian soccer player
