= Edgar Cohen =

Edgar Cohen may refer to:

- Edgar Israel Cohen (1853–1933), British sponge and cigar merchant
- Edgar A. Cohen (1859–1939), American photographer
