= Edgaras =

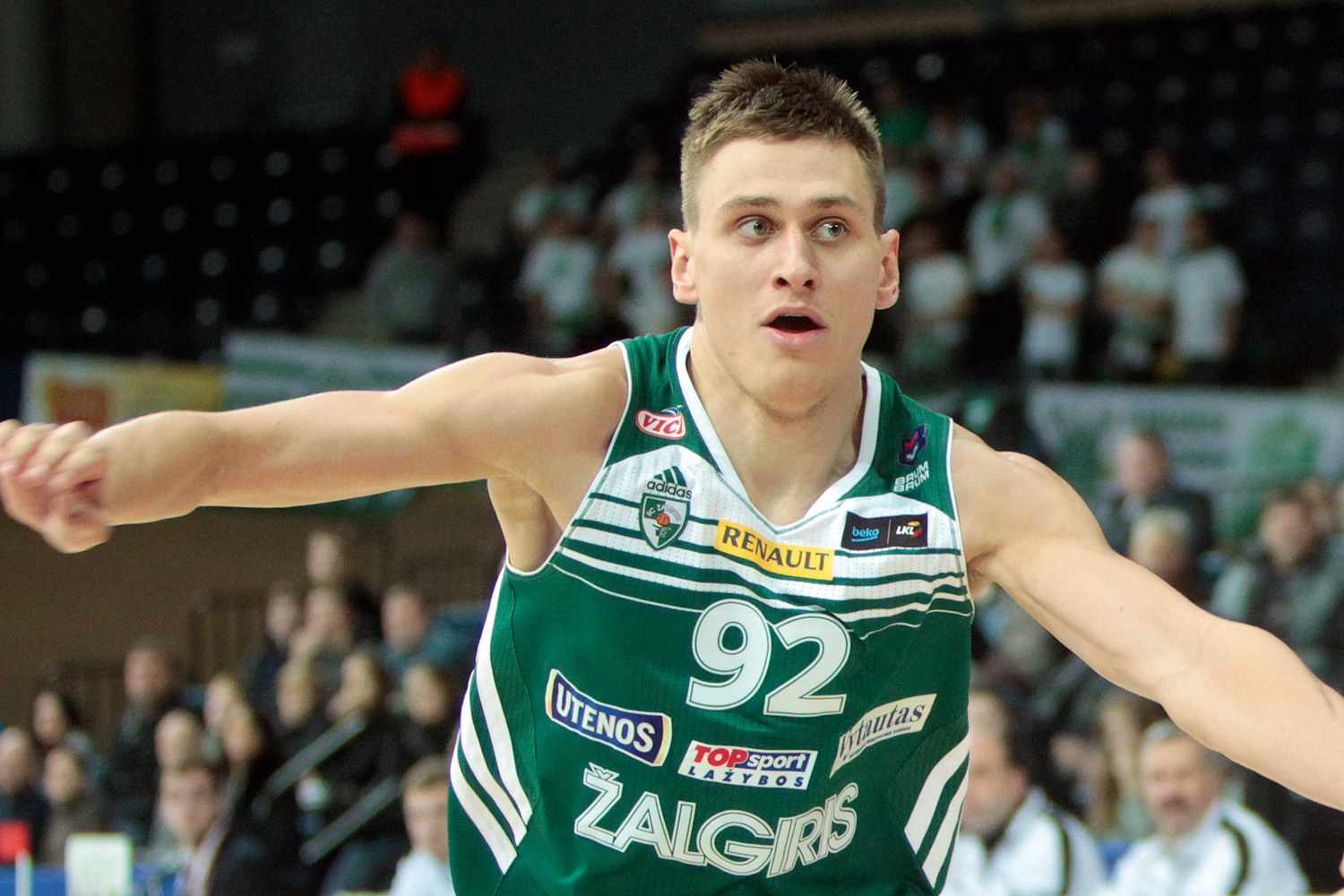
- Basketball player Edgaras Ulanovas
- Gender: Male

Origin
- Origin: Edgar
- Meaning: prosperous spearman
- Region of origin: Lithuania

Edgaras is a Lithuanian masculine given name.

- Edgaras Česnauskis (born 1984), Lithuanian footballer who plays for FC Rostov
- Edgaras Jankauskas (born 1975), Lithuanian retired footballer, and a current assistant manager at FC Lokomotiv Moscow
- Edgaras Mastianica (born 1988), Lithuanian professional footballer
- Edgaras Stanionis (born 1988), Lithuanian professional basketball player
- Edgaras Tumasonis (born 1968), Lithuanian retired football defender
- Edgaras Ulanovas (born 1992), Lithuanian professional basketball player
- Edgaras Venckaitis (born 1985), Lithuanian wrestler
- Edgaras Voveris (born 1967), Lithuanian orienteering competitor
