= Edgar Allan (disambiguation) =

Edgar Allan (1842–1904), was an American politician. Notable people with the name include:

- Edgar Allan Guzman (born 1989), Filipino actor
- Edgar Allan Poe (1809–1849), American writer

== See also ==
- Edgar (name)
- Edgar Allen (disambiguation)
