= Edgar Allen (disambiguation) =

Edgar Allen (1892–1943) was an American anatomist.

Edgar Allen may also refer to:

- Edgar Johnson Allen (1866–1942), biologist
- List of The Sandman characters
- Edgar Van Nuys Allen (1900–1961), American doctor
- Edgar Allen and Company, steel maker and engineer

== See also ==
- Edgar (name)
- Edgar Allan (1842–1904), delegate to the Virginia Constitutional Convention of 1868
- Edgar Allan (disambiguation)
- Edward Allen (disambiguation)
