= Edgar Endress =

Chilean artist

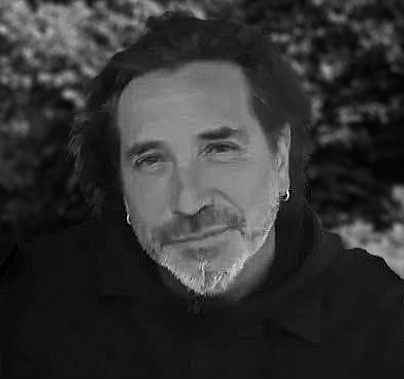
- Born: November 4, 1970 (age 55) Osorno, Chile
- Occupation: Artist; Professor
- Children: 2

Website
- eendress.com

Edgar Endress (born 1970) is a Chilean-American multimedia artist and academic whose work explores themes of migration, political participation, and collective action through video, performance, and public art. Based in the United States since 1999, he is known for participatory projects that engage audiences in social and political contexts. His work has been exhibited internationally and is held in collections including the Museum of Fine Arts, Boston, the Museo Nacional Centro de Arte Reina Sofía, and the Library of Congress. He is a professor of art at George Mason University.

== Early life ==
Born in Osorno, Chile, in 1970, Endress lived through some of the most significant political changes in the country's history. His birth year marked Chile's transition from democracy to Socialism under democratically elected Salvador Allende. Three years later, Chile fell under the military dictatorship of Augusto Pinochet following the 1973 Chilean coup d'état. Endress's formative years were therefore spent under a repressive regime that would not return to democracy—with freedom of speech and artistic expression—until he reached adulthood in 1990. Endress witnessed and experienced the effects of this repressive regime firsthand. His father, a teacher, was imprisoned for five days after refusing to leave the schoolhouse to cheer for Pinochet's troops as they marched through their hometown. These early experiences sparked Endress's interest in art, which became one of the few outlets for expressing feelings of repression and fear in times of autocratic control.

He grew up during a period when Chile had only one television channel and access to uncensored information was largely restricted to shortwave radio broadcasts. In this media environment, visual art served as an important medium for subtle forms of resistance, with artists incorporating coded imagery and hidden meanings into their work. As a result, many of the art works that emerged in Chile at this time were often associated with collaborative, performance pieces or hidden messaging. These formative experiences influenced Endress's later practice, which emphasizes collaborative public art and employs context-dependent media that combines artistic expression with social engagement.

== Art career ==
Though Edgar Endress initially received Bachelor of Science (B.S.) in International Economics from the Metropolitan University of Technology (Universidad Tecnologica Metropolitana), he shifted his focus and pursued the arts. In 1998, Endress graduated from the Institute of Art and Communication (Artes de las Comunicaciones - ACROS) in Santiago, Chile, with the equivalent of a Bachelor of Fine Arts in Audio-Visual Communication. He subsequently received his Master of Fine Arts (MFA) in Video Art from Syracuse University in 2001.

In the 1990s, Endress participated in multiple iterations of the Art Biennale for Video and Electronic Art in Santiago, Chile where he was able to work closely with the director Nestor Olhagaray. From 1996 to 2001 he participated in multiple festivals where he received various awards. In 2002, he received an Artist-in-Residence fellowship from the C.I.C.V. in Herimoncourt, France. In 2003, he was a lecturer at Mercer County Community College. The following year he worked as an artist in residence at the Akademie Schloss Solitude in Stuttgart, Germany where he was funded by a fellowship and organized a symposium in 2005 as coordinator of the academy. He has continued at George Mason University (GMU) since 2004 where he is currently a full professor in the College of Visual and Performing Arts (CVPA) as well as a practicing artist.

Endress explores engaging viewers in both traditional and unconventional avenues for art. Many of his works incorporate elements of play and interaction as they explore the relationship between materials, stories, and experiences. He employs mixed media where the product used to create the work become a critical element of the message for the work itself.

His performance works are well documented in books and journals and his works can be seen at the Museo de Arte Moderno de Buenos Aires, Museum of Fine Arts Boston, Museo National Centro de Arte Reina Sofia, Madrid, and the Library of Congress, Washington D.C.

=== Public art projects ===
Endress specializes in Public Art projects in addition to his multidisciplinary practice. He was a founding member and contributor for several collectives and projects including the Floating Lab Collective in Virginia, U.S., ASCHOY (Asociacion Chojcha de la Hoyada) in La Paz, Bolivia, Bon Dieu Bon in the Virgin Islands, U.S., and the Icebox Collective in Maryland, U.S.

His public art projects with groups like the Floating Lab Collective, link his interest in public art with his desire to pursue non traditional avenues to present art. A good example of his approach to "impure" art - public events, demonstrations, happenings - is the public piece, Scream at the Economy. This work demonstrates direct lines from his early education in economics and his recurring interest in collective empowerment - using art to bring communities together and create change.

Endress notes the experience with the Floating Lab Collective, Collective White House, was one of the most memorable. This was one of many works around the White House and his role as an immigrant in the Washington D.C. metro area. Another piece that garnered international attention was Protesting on Demand - Mexico/DC. Originally produced in D.C., Protesting on Demand, was tailored for the TransitionMX International Electronic and Video Arts Festival in Mexico under Grace Quintanilla. In this iteration, Sean Watkins and other local Floating Lab Collective collaborators stood in front of the White House in Washington D.C.and captured/shared protests by passersby while Irene Clouthier and Endress mirrored the experience in Mexico in front of the National Palace (Palacio Nacional), the equivalent housing for the president in Mexico. The two public art experiences were then collectively shown via live feed at the Alameda Art Laboratory (Laboratorio Arte Alameda).

=== Selected grants and fellowships ===
- 2001 Grand Marnier Foundation Fellowship at the Lincoln Center, New York
- 2002 C.I.C.V. (Le Centre International de Création Vidéo) Artist in Residence Fellowship, Herimoncourt, France
- 2003 Grant from Fondart (National Fund for the Development of Culture and the Arts), Santiago, Chile
- 2004 Academy Schloss Solitude Artist in Residence, Stuttgart, Germany
- 2005 Creative Capital Fund for Carry On
- 2006 Virginia Museum of Fine Arts Fellowship for Video and Media
- 2006 Virgin Islands Council on the Arts (USVI) for the Transfer Project- Part 1, St. Thomas, Virgin Islands
- 2007 Virgin Islands Council on the Arts (USVI) for the Transfer Project- Part 2, St. Thomas, Virgin Islands
- 2010 Virgin Islands Council on the Arts (USVI) for the Transfer Project- Part 3, St. Thomas, Virgin Islands
- 2013 Virginia Museum of Fine Arts Fellowship for Mixed Media - Collaborative
- 2017 Rankin Scholar in Residence at Drexel University, Pennsylvania, U.S.
- 2018 La Maison Dora Maar Artist in Residence Fellowship, Ménerbes, France
- 2019 James Madison University Artist in Residence Fellowship, Virginia, U.S.

== Critical reception ==
Writers and critics have situated Endress’s work within traditions of socially engaged and participatory art. His projects often examine the relationship between individual agency and collective action, particularly in politically charged contexts. Scholars have also noted the influence of Latin American experimental media traditions in his use of video and performance.
