= Edgar Durazo =

Mexican bull rider (born 1991)

Personal information
- Full name: Edgar Durazo Ortíz
- Born: 25 August 1991 (age 35) Moctezuma, Sonora, Mexico
- Height: 5 ft 10 in (178 cm)
- Weight: 168 lb (76 kg)
- Relative: Erubiel Durazo (second cousin)

Sport
- Sport: Rodeo
- Event: Bull riding
- College team: Southwest Texas Junior College
- Turned pro: 2010

Achievements and titles
- Highest world ranking: 2014 WPB Champion; 2019 CPRA Rookie of the Year; 2019 CPRA bull riding champion 2023 CPRA bull riding champion

Edgar Durazo Ortíz (born 25 August 1991) is a Mexican professional rodeo cowboy who specializes in bull riding. He turned pro in 2010 and later moved to Canada, where he won the Canadian Professional Rodeo Association (CPRA) bull riding championship in 2019 and 2023.

== Early and personal life ==
Durazo was born in the rural community of Moctezuma, Sonora, Mexico, and grew up on his family's ranch, where his grandfather raised beef cattle which was sold to the United States. His father, Felipe, was a bull rider, while his uncle was a talented bronc rider. Durazo grew up watching the PBR World Finals and National Finals Rodeo every year with his father, who sparked his passion for the sport from a young age. "As a kid, you always wanted to be like your dad," he explained. "Since I can remember, I wanted to be a bull rider... My dad rode bulls. I wanted to be like my dad." Felipe died of cancer in 2016.

Durazo began riding sheep on his family's ranch at age three before graduating to steers. He also participated in team roping and was a bullfighter before he was finally allowed to ride his first bull at the age of 15. After graduating from high school in 2009, Durazo began competing in rodeos in the northwestern states of Sonora, Chihuahua, and Baja California, winning several buckles. He soon earned a rodeo scholarship to Southwest Texas Junior College in Uvalde, Texas, where he competed on the college rodeo scene. Durazo then returned to Mexico to continue his studies as an agricultural technician.

Durazo moved to Canada in 2012 with his wife Karla. The couple relocated to San Antonio, Texas, in early 2015, before returning to Canada in 2016 following the death of his father. His second cousin is former professional baseball player Erubiel Durazo.

== Professional career ==
=== 2010–2016: Early career ===
Durazo obtained his Professional Bull Riders (PBR) card in 2010 and made his pro debut at a Touring Pro Division event in San Antonio that same year, returning to the circuit in 2011. After going back to Mexico and competing in local rodeos for a year, he was convinced by a friend to relocate to Canada to compete due to continuous visa issues in the United States. Durazo found a ranch near Calgary to work on, training horses and shoeing calves, while he worked on gaining permanent residency in Canada. In 2013, he debuted on the PBR Canada circuit in addition to returning to the Touring Pro Division. That same year, he also competed on the then-new Bull Riders Canada (BRC) circuit. Durazo won the Duty Free Border Town Show Down, held on the Canada–United States border, as well as the inaugural BRC Finals in Cold Lake, Alberta, where he went 3-for-3 for the victory.

Early successes for Durazo in PBR Canada included a second-place finish at the inaugural Gold Eagle Casino Classic in August 2014 and an event win at the Delburne Hillbilly Stomp the following month. One week after competing at the 2014 PBR Canada Finals in Saskatoon, Durazo won the 2014 World Professional Bullriding (WPB) Finals in Calgary with a 90-point ride on 923 Aurora in the short go round. The performance secured him the WPB championship after also finishing as the WPB season standings leader. Durazo also returned to the BRC in 2014, placing second at the season-opening Hooves & Horns Bull Riding in Rimbey. He won the Greystone Investments Bull Riding in Balzac and the 35th Annual Ralston Rodeo Bull Riding in Ralston, both in the same week in August, to move from 16th to 10th in the season standings. Durazo finished 11th in the regular season and qualified for the BRC Finals for the second year in a row.

Durazo moved to Texas in 2015 and obtained his Professional Rodeo Cowboys Association (PRCA) permit, but took some time to adjust to competing on the new circuit. "It was a little hard for me," he admitted. "I did not know how to enter rodeos." Durazo did, however, win the Crosby Fair & Rodeo in Crosby, Texas, that June with an 85-point ride on Grey Goose. He increased his PRCA workload in 2016, competing at notable events such as the Southwestern Exposition and Livestock Show, the Rio Grande Valley Livestock Show and Rodeo, the Clark County Fair and Rodeo, the Helldorado Days Rodeo, the Greeley Stampede, the St. Paul Rodeo, the Molalla Buckeroo, the 101st Snake River Stampede, the 120th Cheyenne Frontier Days, and the New Mexico State Fair & Rodeo, respectively, but failed to pick up any more event wins on the circuit.

=== 2017 season ===
Durazo won a PBR Real Time Pain Relief Velocity Tour event in Kearney, Nebraska, to open the 2017 PBR Velocity Tour season.

After finishing the previous year unranked in the PBR Canada standings, Durazo entered the 2017 PBR Canada Finals at the no. 10 spot in the nation. He tied with Zane Lambert for the event win following an 88-point ride aboard Herf in the championship round, finishing the year ranked third in the PBR Canada national standings and 57th in the PBR world standings. That November, Durazo represented his home country at the inaugural PBR Global Cup in Edmonton, where he went 2-for-4 for Team Mexico. His performance was highlighted by an 86.75-point ride on South Texas Gangster in the bonus round. Durazo and teammate Francisco Morales acted as makeshift translators for Mexico due to a language barrier between most of the team and head coach Michael Gaffney.

=== 2018 season ===
On 13 January 2018, Durazo won the PBR Velocity Tour event in Portland, Oregon, after producing consecutive 88-point scores to go 2-for-2. Just one week later, he made his PBR Unleash the Beast Series debut at the Express Employment Professionals Invitational in Oklahoma City, where he entered as a last-minute alternate following an injury to another rider and placed 11th in his first elite-tour event. Durazo was later knocked unconscious at the first PBR Canada event of the season, which was held in Lethbridge. After making his return, he represented Team Mexico at the second-annual PBR Global Cup in Sydney, but he was bucked off in his one out.

In early November, Durazo competed at the PBR Velocity Tour Finals in Las Vegas, where he placed ninth in the aggregate and finished the season ranked 21st in the Velocity Tour standings. He then closed out the year by placing ninth at the PBR Canada Finals in Saskatoon, finishing the season ranked 20th in the PBR Canada national standings.

=== 2019 season: First Canadian title ===
Durazo suffered a pelvic contusion at the 2019 PBR Global Cup in Arlington, Texas, when he was stepped on by a bull after a 7.58-second buckoff in Round 1, and was consequently sidelined for two months. After coming back, he won the Brooks Black Gold Bullarama, a PBR Canada Touring Pro Division event in Brooks, Alberta, by going 2-for-2.

Until then, Durazo had spent most of his career competing in the PBR. In 2019, he also obtained his Canadian Professional Rodeo Association (CPRA) permit, which he filled in order to purchase his full card membership. Durazo won the Swift Current Xtreme Bulls Invitational in May, the Sundre Pro Rodeo in June, the Ponoka Stampede in July, and both the Dawson Creek Stampede and the Jasper Heritage Rodeo in August. Durazo was crowned the Finning Pro Tour champion, which he secured with a 90-point ride on One-Eyed Charlie at the Finning Pro Tour Finals. He also won the CPRA Rookie of the Year and Permit awards, and finished as the Season Leader with $47,916.01 in earnings.

Durazo became the first Mexican competitor to ever qualify for the Canadian Finals Rodeo (CFR) in the event's history. He "stole the show" at the CFR by winning the first three rounds and riding all six of his bulls, breaking the CFR bull riding event record with $58,725 in earnings. Durazo placed second in the aggregate standings behind Jordan Hansen, who also went 6-for-6, and finished with $106,641.01 in total earnings – $7,284 more than Hansen – to capture the 2019 CPRA bull riding championship. "I did my part, but Edgar rode awesome all year and was the same during the CFR," said Hansen of Durazo.

=== 2020 season ===
Durazo was named team captain for Mexico ahead of his fourth edition of the PBR Global Cup in 2020. He completed a then-career-high 89-point ride aboard Cochise to win the bonus round, which was Mexico's highest-ever score at a Global Cup, before he was bucked off by @PBR on TikTok in 7.11 seconds in Round 3. However, both the 2020 CPRA season and the CFR were cancelled due to the COVID-19 pandemic.

=== 2021 season ===
In July 2021, Durazo competed at his first Calgary Stampede. In August, he won the Strathmore Stampede, securing the event win with an 87.5-point ride atop Sky Fall, followed by event wins at the Guy Weadick Rodeo and the Okotoks Pro Rodeo. The following month, on 7 September, Durazo suffered five broken ribs and a bruised lung when he was stepped on by a bull on the first day of the Cody Snyder Bullbustin' event in Calgary. He was forced to sit out of action for two months, during which he missed four events. Despite this, he was able to finish as the Season Leader with $15,782.21 in earnings.

Durazo returned in time for the CFR, where, after getting bucked off by his first two bulls, he set the arena record with a 92.25-point ride on Up Shift in Round 3. He went 2-for-6 and placed fourth in the aggregate, as well as third for the overall season with $32,942.21 in total earnings.

=== 2022 season ===
Durazo began his 2022 season in late 2021 by competing at the Maple Leaf Circuit Finals, a direct qualifier to the PRCA's NFR Open which was forged via a partnership with the CPRA. He went 3-for-4 to place fourth in the aggregate. In February 2022, Durazo was selected to his fifth PBR Global Cup roster (the 2021 edition was cancelled due to the COVID-19 pandemic). However, he was replaced by Alfonso Orozco after suffering a broken ankle at the San Antonio Stock Show & Rodeo later that month. After missing more than three months of action, he returned at the Grande Prairie Stompede in May, where he placed second. In June, Durazo tied Craig Tyler for the event win at the Leduc Black Gold Rodeo in Leduc, Alberta, by producing a 90.5-point ride aboard Smog. He won two more events that month, finishing in a three-way tie for the event win at the Stavely Pro Rodeo in Stavely, Alberta, before winning the Sundre Pro Rodeo in Sundre, Alberta, with a 90.5-point ride atop Red Lipstick. Durazo then attempted to defend his Strathmore Stampede title from the previous year; he completed an 88.5-point ride on Blue Bombshell but was bested by Jordan Hansen, who scored 88.75 points on his second re-ride to secure the event win. "Me and Edgar, we’ve had a few battles for sure," said Hansen of Durazo. "That’s one of the nicest guys on the planet. It’s hard not to cheer for him."

Durazo qualified for the CFR, but was unable to compete after suffering a broken foot in October. He finished the season ranked ninth in the final Canadian standings with $25,176.24 in earnings.

=== 2023 season: Second Canadian title ===
Due to his injury, Durazo did not begin his 2023 season until April. That month, he won the Springville Sierra Rodeo in Springville, California, with an 86-point ride on Chucks Boy. Back in Canada, Durazo won the Sundre Pro Rodeo in June, followed by the Rockyford Rodeo in July. In August, he won the Strathmore Stampede for the second time in three years, securing the event win with an 89.5-point ride on Wild Time in the championship round, as well as the Okotoks Pro Rodeo, where he rode Hou's Sippin' for 91 points for the event win. Durazo was crowned the SMS Equipment Pro Tour champion. "In the end, rodeos like this give me that good feeling inside," he said after the Pro Tour Finals in September. "They own my heart. I feel it every time I come to arenas like this one to be part of the sport I love." Durazo finished fifth in the CPRA regular season standings with $36,146.69 in earnings, qualifying for his fourth straight CFR.

At the CFR, Durazo went 5-for-6 to capture his second CPRA bull riding championship, as well as the CFR bull riding average title. He produced his best score of the event in Round 1, which he won by riding the previous year's Bull of the Year, Devils Advocate, for 89 points. Despite suffering a broken nose during the event, Durazo went on to win Round 6 with an 88-point ride aboard Rust Bucket to seal the season title with $82,467.36 in total earnings.

=== 2024 season ===
In January 2024, Durazo competed at the inaugural San Diego Rodeo, an invitational event held at Petco Park which did not count towards any standings. He won the Grande Prairie Stompede in June with an 89-point ride on Wild Time, then finished in a three-way tie for the event win at the Raymond Stampede after producing an 87-point ride atop Ramblin Man. In August, Durazo won the Cranbrook Pro Rodeo in Cranbrook, British Columbia, after riding Jungle Spot for 86 points. The following month, he produced an 89-point ride on Toothless Smile to secure the event win at Oldstoberfest in Olds, Alberta.

In October at the CFR, Durazo won Round 3 with 85.5 points on Haunted Creek. He also won Round 5 with 85.25 points on Wreckonciled. He finished second in the average and also second in the final season standings with $59,124.

In November, Durazo clinched the year-end bull riding championship at the Maple Leaf Circuit Finals Rodeo in Regina, Saskatchewan. As a result, he qualified for the NFR Open at the Pikes Peak or Bust Rodeo in Colorado Springs, Colorado, in 2025.

=== 2025 season ===
In June 2025, Durazo won the Daines Ranch Rodeo in Innisfail, Alberta, after scoring 86.5 points on Yeller Feller. In early August, he won the Strathmore Stampede in Strathmore, Alberta, by riding Santana for 87.75 points. In late August, he won the Nicola Valley Pro Rodeo in Merritt, British Columbia, with 87.5 points on Rock N Roll.

In October at the CFR, Durazo bucked off his first four bulls. However, in Round 5, he rode Dark Mark for 89.25 points and won the round. He finished seventh in the average and fifth in the final season standings with $47,431.94 in earnings.

In November at the Maple Leaf Circuit Finals Rodeo, Durazo won the year-end bull riding championship for the second year in a row and clinched another trip to the NFR Open.

=== 2026 season ===
In April 2026, Durazo won the Broncs & Honky Tonks Spring Rodeo in Medicine Hat, Alberta, after scoring 87.5 points on Down With The Devil. In June, Durazo won the Grande Prairie Stompede for the second time in three years, after scoring 88 points on Magic Jam. In August, Durazo won the Pincher Creek Pro Rodeo in Pincher Creek, Alberta, with 87.5 points on F.A.F.O. Durazo did not win enough money to qualify for the CFR this year.

=== Season wins ===
- 2014 WPB champion
- 2019 CPRA Rookie of the Year
- 2019 CPRA bull riding champion
- 2019 CPRA Finning Pro Tour bull riding champion
- 2023 CPRA bull riding champion
- 2023 CPRA SMS Equipment Pro Tour bull riding champion
- 2024 CPRA Maple Leaf Circuit bull riding champion
- 2025 CPRA Maple Leaf Circuit bull riding champion

=== Event wins ===
- 2013 Duty Free Border Town Show Down (Coutts, Alberta)
- 2013 BRC Finals (Cold Lake, Alberta)
- 2014 Greystone Investments Bull Riding (Balzac, Alberta)
- 2014 Ralston Rodeo Bull Riding (Ralston, Alberta)
- 2014 Delburne Hillbilly Stomp PBR (Delburne, Alberta)
- 2014 WPB Finals (Calgary, Alberta)
- 2015 Stettler Roughstock Rodeo (Stettler, Alberta)
- 2015 Crosby Fair & Rodeo (Crosby, Texas)
- 2016 Real Time Pain Relief Velocity Tour - Kearney (Kearney, Nebraska)
- 2017 PBR Canada Finals (Saskatoon, Saskatchewan)
- 2018 Real Time Pain Relief Velocity Tour - Portland (Portland, Oregon)
- 2019 Brooks Black Gold Bullarama (Brooks, Alberta)
- 2019 Cody Snyder Swift Current Xtreme Bulls Invitational (Swift Current, Saskatchewan)
- 2019 Sundre Pro Rodeo (Sundre, Alberta)
- 2019 Ponoka Stampede (Ponoka, Alberta)
- 2019 Dawson Creek Stampede (Dawson Creek, British Columbia)
- 2019 Jasper Heritage Rodeo (Jasper, Alberta)
- 2019 CPRA Finning Pro Tour Finals (Armstrong, British Columbia)
- 2021 Strathmore Stampede (Strathmore, Alberta)
- 2021 Guy Weadick Rodeo (High River, Alberta)
- 2021 Okotoks Pro Rodeo (Millarville, Alberta)
- 2022 Leduc Black Gold Rodeo (Leduc, Alberta)
- 2022 Stavely Pro Rodeo (Stavely, Alberta)
- 2022 Sundre Pro Rodeo (Sundre, Alberta)
- 2023 Springville Sierra Rodeo (Springville, California)
- 2023 Sundre Pro Rodeo (Sundre, Alberta)
- 2023 Rockyford Rodeo (Rockyford, Alberta)
- 2023 Strathmore Stampede (Strathmore, Alberta)
- 2023 Okotoks Pro Rodeo (Millarville, Alberta)
- 2023 Canadian Finals Rodeo (Red Deer, Alberta)
- 2024 Grande Prairie Stompede (Grande Prairie, Alberta)
- 2024 Raymond Stampede (Raymond, Alberta)
- 2024 Cranbrook Pro Rodeo (Cranbrook, British Columbia)
- 2024 Oldstoberfest (Olds, Alberta)
- 2025 Daines Ranch Rodeo (Innisfail, Alberta)
- 2025 Strathmore Stampede (Strathmore, Alberta)
- 2025 Nicola Valley Pro Rodeo (Merritt, British Columbia)
- 2026 Broncs & Honky Tonks Spring Rodeo (Medicine Hat, Alberta)
- 2026 Grande Prairie Stompede (Grande Prairie, Alberta)
- 2026 Pincher Creek Pro Rodeo (Pincher Creek, Alberta)

== Honors ==
In 2020, the regional Mexican band Grupo La Kaña honored Durazo with a song called "El Jinete (Edgar Durazo)" from the group's 2020 album, Rancheras con La Kaña.

In December 2023, Durazo was awarded the Premio Luchador Olmeca by the Confederación Deportiva Mexicana.
