= Edgar Haynes =

American Christian evangelist (1866-1923)

Edgar Allan Poe Haynes (May 18, 1866 – January 11, 1923) was an American Christian evangelist. He was known variously as E. A. P. Haynes, Allan Haynes, and Allen Haynes. He was a philanthropist, ardent anti-liquor crusader, and international businessman, who, over the course of his lifetime, sold insurance, newspapers, cement, and his own expertise in business engineering. Haynes also had a lengthy criminal record of embezzlement, fraud, and failure to pay debts, as well as a history of frequent disappearances, location changes, and turnover in employment in the United States and abroad.

== Early years ==
Edgar Allen Poe Haynes was born on May 18, 1866, in Kirklin, Indiana, the seventh of eight children of Eldridge Clark Haynes and Maria Belle Eldridge. He was named after the writer Edgar Allan Poe.

He married Cora Idella Schwinn of Madison County, Indiana, on November 25, 1886 and they had three children, Hazel, Evan, and Eldridge Haynes.

== 1894–1906: St. Louis, Missouri ==
=== Aetna ===
Before arriving in St. Louis, at the age of 21 Haynes delivered a talk titled, "Course of Study for Township and Village Graded Schools" at an Indiana State Teachers Association gathering in Indianapolis. In 1892 he was selling insurance and had been elected secretary of the Indiana Association of Life Underwriters.

Haynes was employed as an agent of the Aetna Insurance Company of Hartford, Connecticut, in St. Louis, MO. from 1894 to July 1906. In a Houston, MO, paper Haynes was listed among “251 men and women of more than local fame of their various professions -- many of them national and international fame" who had made contributions to the St. Louis Post-Dispatch. An article in the St. Louis Post-Dispatch said that Haynes "[stood] alone as the one man who [insisted] upon combining the actual exercise of religious proceedings with those of his business."

=== Spruce Street and City Missions ===
Haynes served in ministries with social impact. In his first year in St. Louis, Haynes was elected an officer in the Central Branch of the Young Men's Christian Association. By 1899 he had organized the Spruce Street Mission to reach the homeless in St. Louis. The program consisted of preaching and concerts of classical music designed to draw the men up like a "magnet" as opposed to hoisting them up from below. He later concluded that an impoverished person's "physical and constitutional impairment" must be treated prior to "their resulting mental and moral deficiencies" and that doctors and hospitals would benefit the indigent more than preachers and missions. The Spruce Street mission also sponsored picnic outings for children and meals for the hungry. On April 23, 1903, Haynes opened the St. Louis City Mission, described as "one of the distinctive downtown institutions of its kind." At that time he was a member and pastoral assistant at the Plymouth Congregational Church, ministering to "one of the weaker congregations of the denomination in St. Louis."

=== Anti-wineroom crusader ===
Haynes was an ardent supporter of the St. Louis Anti-Wineroom Crusade, the goal of which was to prosecute violators of wineroom laws. Haynes organized the crusade shortly after he, along with three others, were witnesses at the September 1899 hearing of a saloon-keeper, Albert Rabe. They testified that he had "a piano in the place that kept going at all hours of the night, and that disturbances in which the police had to interfere were of frequent occurrence. It was also shown that the place was frequented by women." He was named to the executive committee of the Crusade at its first meeting and was a prominent voice in its public relations.

As chairman, Haynes signed a December 2, 1899, agreement between the St. Louis Excise Commissioner, police, and the Anti-Wineroom Crusade, which permitted Crusaders to help enforce of wineroom laws by sharing "surveillance over saloons frequented by prostitutes and criminals," and also promote the Anti-Wineroom agenda and keep the public informed about the record of police enforcement of the laws. In March 1900 Haynes and Crusade representatives attended a meeting between the St. Louis Board of Election Commissioners and 91 saloon-keepers accused of violating saloon establishment laws. The saloon-keepers were ordered to cease unlawful activity or lose their licenses. In April Haynes wrote a letter for the Crusade to the police department accusing law enforcement of being soft on saloon-keepers and failing to "strike out this evil," specifically negligent policing of prostitution, sales of liquor to under-aged persons, use of shades and screens as a cover for illegal activity, serving "thieves and criminal characters" and violations of the Newberry Law, which prohibited music in winerooms.

=== Speaker and preacher ===
Haynes led Bible studies and was frequently called upon to preach, occasionally sharing responsibilities with ordained pastors. In 1898 he organized a Congregational Church he named the People's Tabernacle. He was described as having "a commanding presence and ardent temperament, combined with a good voice". The writer added that he "gives the impression of having a large reserve fund of nervous energy". Two years later Haynes was a temporary pastor of Hope Congregational Church.

=== Gideon's National Organization ===
Haynes' organized a local band of Gideons shortly after the turn of the century in St. Louis. The Gideons were described as "an association of Christian traveling men" whose object was "to minister to the religious life and raise the standard of character of the commercial traveler." His evangelical activity and motivational speaking took him to a number of national gatherings over the Midwestern and eastern United States, and by 1905 he was serving as president of the national organization. In St. Louis he personally paid for the Gideon's secretary and for a weekly publication.

== 1907–1909 From St. Louis to Spokane ==
In February 1907 Haynes resigned as local manager of the Aetna agency. The vice president of Aetna said there was a "disagreement" over $20,000 that the corporate office claimed was owed to them. The matter was settled to Aetna's satisfaction when Haynes turned the otherwise successful local agency over to them. Haynes could not be found for comment.

=== Manhattan Insurance ===
In April 1907, Haynes was hired as an agent of the Manhattan Insurance Company with an office in St. Louis. A friend, Murray Carleton, accompanied Haynes to Manhattan's corporate office in New York City to vouch for Haynes' character. Carleton's name later appeared on a list of men who had "lost by their transactions" with Haynes." Haynes' employment with Manhattan ended four months later. Three years later, Manhattan went public with charges of embezzlement and orders were issued for his arrest.

Haynes left St. Louis, changed his name to "Allan Haynes" and operated a publishing company in Spokane. Haynes held several insurance jobs in Chicago, after leaving Manhattan. One of his St. Louis bondsmen stated that after Haynes left St. Louis he moved to Seattle, "and was in a successful land deal with the Mayor of that city. but later lost all his money and that of his associates." The bondsman continued, "He went to Spokane and got into trouble there, but his friends, realizing his ability, put him in charge of 'an evening' newspaper, with absolutely no handling of money, and he succeeded as a manager."

Having had problems in Spokane prior to taking on the newspaper, and the intervention of friends to prevent his access to money in a Haynes later left out the parts about Seattle in a short autobiography that said that after his term with Manhattan he moved to Chicago "without a dollar in money and no friends outside St. Louis." He said that after "casting about the city looking for some opening" no work materialized. He moved to Spokane in December 1907, leaving behind the bankruptcy of George W. Cole, chairman of the Southwestern Freight Traffic Bureau in St. Louis. Cole had endorsed promissory notes for friends, including a note of $23,000 for E. A. P. Haynes.

=== Spokane Inland Herald ===
Haynes purchased the Inland Observer and Spokane Press in mid-June 1909. The Inland Observer was subsequently referred to as the Inland Herald when it became a daily on February 1, 1910. On January 1, 1910, a notice appeared in the Spokane Press announcing an upcoming stockholders meeting of the Allan Haynes Publishing Co. The purpose of the meeting was to vote on a proposal to increase the capital stock from $30,000 to $600,000. The shares, worth $10 each, would be divided into preferred stock (20%) and 80% common stock.

Haynes' publication was welcomed by some, who said that it had excellent prospects for success because of a "corps of able men from all over the United States", and "splendid mechanical equipment." They also wrote that "he set a new standard in the west in the handling of news and in the development of feature stories" with his recruitment of "brilliant men from the east," who were paid high salaries.

=== Inland Herald fails ===
In August 1910 a lawsuit was initiated and application made for receivership of the Inland Herald by the business manager, Blinn Yates. Yates testified that the publishing company was losing $40,000 a month and owed employees a total of $200,000. Yates himself was owed $500 in back salary. Further, checks that had been written had not been honored by banks. It was estimated that a total of $500,000 had been lost in the one year the enterprise was in operation. The decision to shut down the paper was based on the disinterest and lack of financial investment of managers.

In February 1911 F. B. Gregg purchased the Herald for $10,000 at auction and invested a total of $100,000 to keep the paper circulating until May 8, 1911, when he suspended publication. All who had invested in Haynes' paper, including Gregg, lost a total of $600,000.

== Charges of embezzlement ==
When the Inland Herald was just shy of five months old, word reached Spokane that Haynes was being sought back in St. Louis to face three charges of embezzlement adding up to $5,000 in a lawsuit filed by the Manhattan Insurance Company. There were also other instances of malfeasance totaling as much as $100,000, which some victims counted as losses and chose not to prosecute because they expected Haynes to pay the loans back and did not want others to know. Haynes blamed the rival Spokane paper, the Spokesman Review, for stirring up matters that he said had already been resolved.

Haynes was described as "magnetic" and "a wonder." A man who had an office near Haynes and became involved in Haynes' mission work, said, "I thought there was never a better man... Everything he did seemed sanctified]." He loaned Haynes $8,300 in bonds in exchange for a promissory note, that, when he tried to redeem it, had no value. He said, "I don't know how he did it. I was not asleep any moment of the time, but the trade was made, nevertheless."

The Inland Herald was backed financially by breweries and saloon owners, as well as railroads, making the Inland Herald, according to a journalist in St. Louis, "a champion of liberal interest in Spokane" and "a railroad organ." Rev. J. H. Bennett from the Corbin Park Methodist Church in Spokane,"denounced Haynes from the pulpit... as a 'power for evil' because of his support of saloon interests."

In a response on July 27, Haynes stated that he was an innocent man who was persecuted. He wrote that he fell into debt out of helpfulness to others and had a long-standing record of honesty. He said "No man can be a liar or rogue and keep up the pretense every hour of the day for years at a time." Haynes also denounced the grand jury hearing, which, he said, told only one side of the story.

The circuit attorney's office would not drop charges, despite efforts of friends to pay off the Manhattan debt. An attache of the circuit attorney stated, "This man was indicted by the Grand Jury. The State does not indict men to force collections or to be party to compromise. There is no chance whatever of this matter being settled any other way than by trial before a jury." In the meantime, Haynes' attorney labored to negotiate a bond while promising Haynes' return. The state responded with the promise that if Haynes did not return voluntarily, they would pursue extradition despite law enforcement's having no money to pay for Haynes' return.

=== Victims and friends ===
Haynes admitted that he owed banks and individuals about $80,000. All the notes Haynes had failed to honor ("a thick sheaf") were presented to the grand jury at the time of his indictment as further evidence of a pattern of defalcation. Most who lost money mentioned that Haynes' charisma, history of benevolent giving, Christian associations, and way with words were major factors. John H. Vette, a money-lender who lost $10,000, described Haynes as "the smoothest proposition I ever encountered." Most victims of his fraud were friends, clients, and co-workers in the mission who were convinced that Haynes was extremely trustworthy and well-intentioned.

Haynes used prayer meetings and ministry settings as a means of obtaining, by "a species of hypnotic influence," large sums of money from others. George Cale, who had trusted Haynes with a loan and lost, died bankrupt shortly after discovering his loss. Rev. Edward Card, a gospel singer, reported that Haynes promised him $150 weekly to work at the St. Louis Mission, but he received only $50 on a sporadic basis and was owed back pay. He stated that sometimes he went for weeks without a paycheck. P. N. Clapp, an employee of a livery, signed a note for additional insurance, making a verbal agreement for what was to be a 90-day loan. Haynes took his money, but never returned the policy and then sold the worthless note to a money lender, who began demanding payment of Clapp. Clapp attempted to resolve the matter privately with Haynes and gained some satisfaction, but he gave Haynes the note for a second time when he asked for it. The second time Haynes did not make good on the debt, and Clapp filed charges. Charles Nelson Hunt, another businessman, stated that Haynes came to his home where he made a plea for money. Hunt offered up $12,000 worth of stock "for a few weeks," noting that it was the sum total of his assets. Upon receiving the stock Haynes went to the bank where he borrowed $5,000 on the strength of it. Five years later Hunt was able to buy his stock back for $6,000 — the total Haynes had borrowed with interest, settling for a significant financial loss on an unfulfilled promise.

== 1911–1914 Out of the country and back ==
=== Edmonton, Alberta ===
In February 1915 the Edmonton Portland Cement Company, which had been organized by Haynes, voluntarily liquidated. A journalist reporting on the liquidation described Haynes as a "meteoric St. Louis promoter" who had moved from Spokane to Edmonton in 1911 to start a "cement concern after a flamboyant advertising campaign." The journalist also said that Haynes left Edmonton "two years ago" and upon leaving Edmonton had, according to hearsay, gone to China. Management attributed the failure of the business to Haynes, who they said had used watered stock to pay his bills, including hotel charges and taxi cabs. "His method, it is said, was to pay at the rate of $1000 worth of stock in settlement of a $500 obligation." The company's official position was that the World War (I) had broken the back of the business due to the lower demand for construction at home. The biggest losers were the first Lieutenant-Governor of Alberta as well as a former warden at the Alberta Penitentiary. A number of stockholders had invested their life savings, although those with the largest investments planned to absorb a greater share of the loss to protect those with smaller investments. The liabilities totaled nearly $560,000.

=== London, England ===
In September 1912 Haynes announced in the London Times a new enterprise, "The Science of Business." The ad said that most businesses could be improved with a little help from "a man of exceptional ability and of such standing and repute that the owners of large concerns could safely ask him to inspect their works, offices, or establishments, and make practical suggestions." The goal, the advertiser said, was to increase profitability through prudent money management and sales techniques. The person it said to call was "Allan Haynes," who had "made business organisation his life's work."

A second ad was published in London on December 14, 1912, reporting on a few of the business problems that could be addressed by "Allan Haynes, Consulting Organiser." These included duplication of work, errors, and balance sheets that are not kept up to date. He said that "Scientific Organisation puts finances on a basis of mechanical certainty" and that "a business needs to be organised according to its possibilities." Haynes' ad said that he was "well known on two continents" and had "extensive and successful" experience in a variety of businesses."

A week after the second ad was published, an Indiana paper reported that Haynes had gone to Chicago in the company of his mother, wife, and youngest sister, Mary, to visit his brother, Pierre Haynes. The Scranton paper mentioned in an April 1914 feature on Haynes' work in Philadelphia, that he had recently "returned from Great Britain and Italy. where he had been to put certain business enterprises on their feet".

=== Philadelphia ===
By the end of 1913 Haynes was in Philadelphia, where he consulted with Wanamaker's, the first department store in the country. Haynes guaranteed Wanamaker that he would "double the business of the stores without extra cost.... by applying psychology to the employees of the establishment" and teaching them "how to treat a customer in a way that brings a return visit." The paper said Haynes had a reputation of being "the most successful business reorganizer in the world," was "an Indiana product," and "had spent years in experimenting before he entered upon what he considers his lifework." It also said, "Jobs are waiting for him in all parts of this country, also in Russia." The article used the word "memorable" to describe Haynes' Spokane venture in publishing and called him a "citizen of the world."

== 1914–1918 Midwest and Central Plains ==
=== Indianapolis ===
On May 21, 1914, "Allen" Haynes was introduced at a Chamber of Commerce luncheon in Indianapolis by the vice president of the trustees of the Teachers College of Indianapolis, Mrs. Meredith Nicholson, as the "organizer of the forces for raising the endowment fund." As part of her introduction she described Haynes as "a business doctor" who used "scientific methods in the up-building of interests retarded in growth." Haynes detailed his plans for the campaign in "an enthusiastic address." Haynes also "made the prophecy that the $300,000 would be raised within three months and all without ceremony of cries for help from the housetops."

Haynes remained in Indianapolis, made the Claypool Hotel his home from time to time and sold insurance for the State Life Insurance Company. Haynes stated that he was an "efficiency expert" and that he had "systematized the workings of some of the largest stores in the United States."

On December 18, 1915, eighteen months after Haynes arrived in Indianapolis, Haynes was charged with larceny. Bond was set at $5,000. Arabella N. Cox told police that Haynes had failed to honor a promissory note for $1,200. He had also given her a check written on the Aetna Trust and Savings Company, and it bounced. An affidavit for his arrest was signed only after Cox's attorney visited the deputy prosecutor, who felt the state did not have a particularly strong criminal case and believed it should be settled as a civil matter. Haynes was bailed out of jail by the president of the J. S. Spann Real Estate and Insurance Company. Haynes' attorney stated he was willing to have the Haynes' case fully investigated, saying there had been no crime. The vice-president of the State Life Insurance Company, Charles F. Coffin, said that Haynes had written many insurance policies and that his work record had been "of the highest order."

The Claypool Hotel reported that Haynes paid all his bills and never wrote a bad check. He had "considerable notoriety as a 'good spender.'"

Nine months later on September 28, 1916, Haynes was arrested again. This time he was indicted by a Marion County, IN, grand jury on five counts of rebating on life insurance premiums. Bond was set at $1,000. Haynes had attempted to incentivize Robert Hall, who was vice-president of the America Underwriters, to buy insurance from him by promising to pay Hall $40 a month if Hall would give him leads on potential buyers. Haynes was out of jail the next day. when the president and secretary-treasurer of the State Life Insurance Company posted bond.

In November 1916, just two months after Haynes was bailed out by his employer, Haynes filed Articles of incorporation for a business called "Allan Haynes, Organizer Inc." He declared $15,000 capital in realty and investments. Allan Haynes, Organizer, Inc. was listed the following day among businesses incorporated. Just two months later, on January 19, 1917, Haynes launched a weekly publication called the "Indianian," which he said had great possibilities."

=== Tulsa and Oklahoma City ===
In January 1918 "Allen M. Haynes" was charged with embezzlement of $14,300 in Tulsa, Oklahoma, during a five-week period between July 20 and August 7, 1917. Haynes had organized an oil business along with another man, J. E. Bruin, whose checking account was alleged to have been used by Haynes "for his own purposes." Allen M. Haynes was believed to be in Oklahoma City, and Tulsa law enforcement appealed to Oklahoma City for help. The embezzlement was expected to total as much as $30,000 before the investigation was over.

On May 29, 1919 "Allan Haynes" was named in a public announcement as a trustee and founder of the Mid-continent Loan Company, declaring $75,000 in capital. Along with Allan Haynes, two other names were listed as incorporators. The date of this notice was May 29, 1919.

== 1919–1921 Waco, Texas ==
On October 16, 1919, Haynes, who was identified as "an organizer, a promoter and expert in an advisory capacity," was sought in Waco, Texas, to face charges on five counts of swindling more than $50. He did not post bail and planned not to respond to the charges until he had consulted with his attorney. He appeared in court the following Monday morning. By the following Thursday, October 23, four of the five cases against Haynes had been dropped. The remaining charge, involving a theft of $500, required the posting of bond, which Haynes provided. The mother of the plaintiff, E. S. Holt, was one of two people who signed off on the bond.

=== Building Waco ===
Two months later on December 28, 1919, Haynes placed a full-page ad in the Waco News-Tribune inviting citizens of Waco to invest in Allan Haynes Organizer-Incorporated, which would enable Waco to be progressive, prosperous, and prestigious. He said that he planned to stay in Waco for a while and that his "experience in civic development in some twenty-five or thirty American, Canadian and European cities" would be more than qualifying for what he had in mind. What he had in mind was a three-point program.

The first point was the establishment of a Waco Trust Company, which Haynes called was the most important. The bank's working capital of $1,000,000 and surplus of $200,000 would allow Haynes to be "an intermediate banker for his client," providing financial assistance to small businesses which suffered a lack of capital, poor credit management, bookkeeping, and generally bad business management. Haynes said that the organization of the bank was already well underway with the support of "several very well regarded and successful Waco business and professional men." He had in mind an unnamed individual among "the ablest bank officials of this city" to manage the bank. He promised "attractive dividends" for shareholders. He noted that while other Waco trust companies had failed, this was due to their limited banking privileges and their inconvenient second floor offices. Haynes' company would be "attractively quartered in a convenient location" and have the privileges the failed banks had not. he said.

The second point was investment in lignite reduction. This enterprise would take Texas' plentiful low grade coal and reduce moisture to give it the same value as anthracite coal, from which gas, fuel oil, and tar could be extracted. His plant could be operated at a greater capacity and economy than others, making fuel gas less expensive, which, he said, "any Waco house wife would appreciate these cold mornings."

The third point was to resource the Allan Haynes Organizer-Incorporated business to rally the "militant power of Greater Waco," which "lies in the, at present, unorganized Waco optimism, genius and energy." Haynes stated that his personal business needed the cooperation and capital of citizen-stockholders in order to be fully effective. His corporation already had capital stock of $25,000, which he admitted was "ridiculously small compared to enterprises undertaken." He said, however, that preferred stock would produce a dividend of 10% for investors. Profits over the 10% would be shared with holders of common stock, and what remained would go to the company. At the end of his ad he said, "I am not asking for subscriptions to this new corporation in order to finance Allan Haynes. I can attend to that myself."

== Later life and death ==
In June 1921 Haynes announced the reorganization of the Edmonton Bulletin, published by Bulletin Company, Limited. Haynes' new venture was renamed the Bulletin Publishing Company, Limited, and Haynes was the provisional director. Haynes authorized capital of $500,000 and said that "the reorganization will add a substantial amount of capital to the resources of the Bulletin." A year later Haynes was in Great Falls, Montana, directing another efficiency engineering enterprise.

On December 2, 1922, Haynes returned to Canada. On the immigration form he gave his last personal address as "Great Falls, Mont.," his purpose for entering Canada as to reside, his occupation as "Efficiency Engineering," and his religion as Presbyterian. Haynes also stated he had never "lived" in Canada and that along with $5,000 in his possession, Haynes was also bringing his wife, "Mary Haynes" and a child. His "apparent condition of health" was "good."

On January 11, 1923, Haynes was arrested for taking money on false pretenses. Within hours of his arrest, Haynes collapsed in his jail cell and was taken to the General Hospital in Vancouver, where he died of a brain hemorrhage at the age of 56, at the same time his wife was delivering a baby at St. Paul's.

In announcements of Haynes' death, he was described as specializing in "efficiency systems for 'sick business enterprises'" and as having worked in Edmonton and Prince George. He was also described as "one of the most picturesque figures in finance".

== Marriage ==
Haynes' wife, Cora Schwinn, was seldom mentioned in the news and only once in the same breath as Allan Haynes. Her name most commonly turned up in connection with various mission groups. In 1903 she was in St. Louis, where Haynes still had an Aetna agency, directing the Central Home of Rest, a mission. The 1910 census put her in Spokane with her husband and their three children, but in November 1910 her name appeared in a St. Louis Star and Times article as treasurer of the Women's Christian Temperance Union (WCTU), campaigning to make Missouri a "dry" state. A year and a half later in May 1912, Cora was re-elected as treasurer of the St. Louis WCTU.

In October 1912, Cora was said to be "of Chicago" in an article on her visit to a friend in Indiana. She and her son Eldridge, age 9, lived with Haynes in England for a time, but a Majestic passengers list shows that she left Southampton, England, in October 1913 with Eldridge only. In March 1914 the Elwood, Indiana Call-Leader recorded that Cora and Eldridge had been living with her sister-in-law, Eva Lorena Gipson Haynes, since the first of the year and were preparing to go to Philadelphia "to make their future home." This would have put her in Philadelphia at the time of Haynes' work with Wanamaker's Department Store. Cora was in Indianapolis the following year, 1915, when she played a part in several meetings of the Vincent CSLC. This also corresponds with the period when her husband was working for State Life Insurance in Indianapolis, but there is no mention of her or any of the children living with him at the Claypool Hotel.

Cora was separated from Haynes, if only unofficially, after Indianapolis. The 1920 census puts her in Oakland, California, with their two youngest children, Evan (age 25) and Eldridge (age 16). She was listed as married, but also as head of the household. Her husband's name was not on the list of household members. In the 1930 census Cora was living with her eldest child, Hazel, and her husband, Martin Faust, in Beverly Hills, California. She was listed as widowed and mother-in-law of the head of the household. The 1940 census put her in Berkeley, CA, widowed and living on her own. There is a note in the census detail to the effect that her "inferred residence" in 1935 was Miami. In 1938 the Sacramento City Directory listed her as "wid Allan." Cora clearly never gave up her identity as the wife of Allan Haynes. She died in Sacramento July 4, 1959, at the age of 94.
