= Erubiel Durazo =

Mexican baseball player (born 1975)

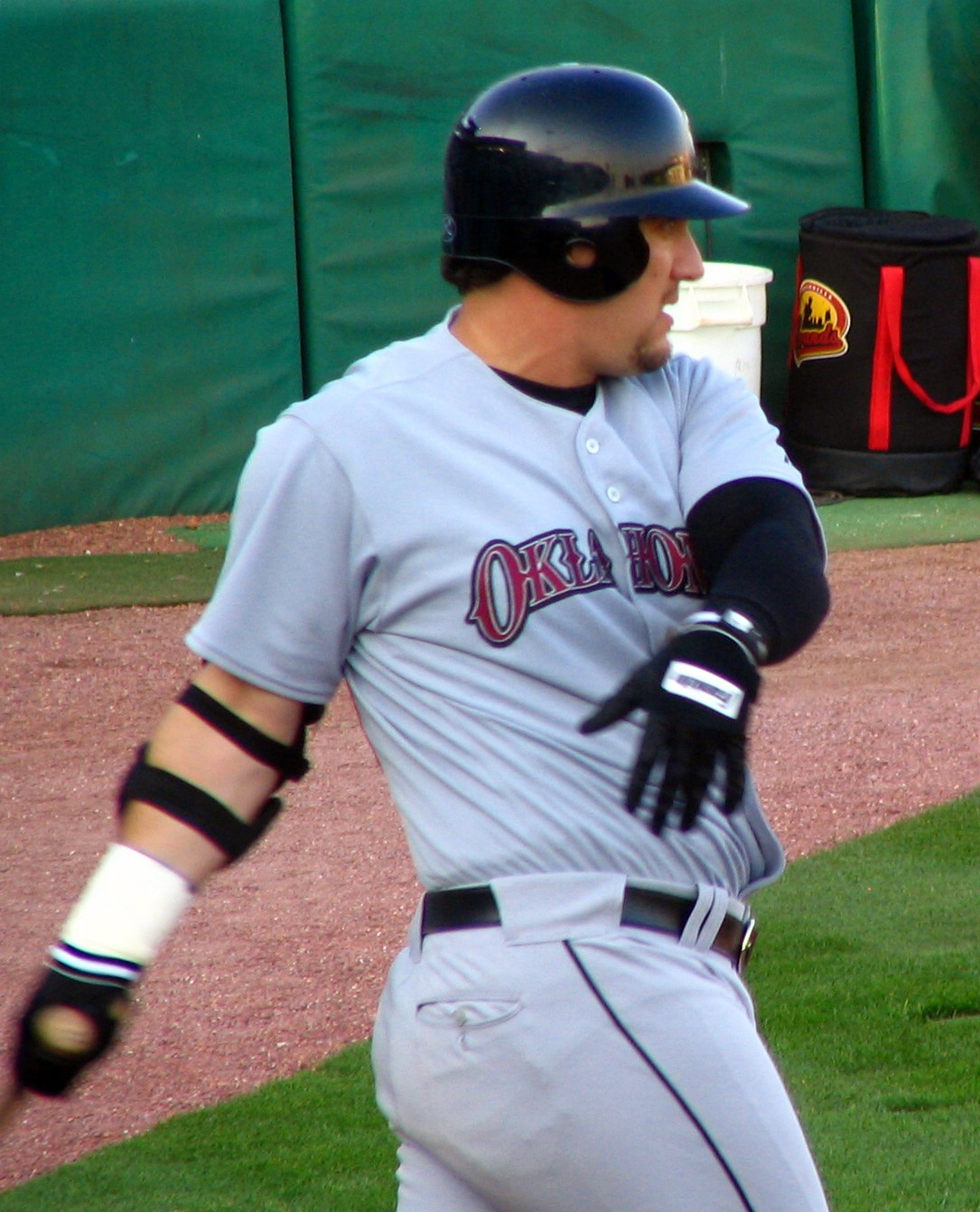
- First baseman / Designated hitter
- Born: January 23, 1974 (age 52); Hermosillo, Sonora, Mexico
- Batted: Left Threw: Left

MLB debut
- July 26, 1999, for the Arizona Diamondbacks

Last MLB appearance
- May 24, 2005, for the Oakland Athletics

MLB statistics
- Batting average: .281
- Home runs: 94
- Runs batted in: 330
- Stats at Baseball Reference

Teams
- Arizona Diamondbacks (1999–2002); Oakland Athletics (2003–2005)

Career highlights and awards
- World Series champion (2001)

Member of the Caribbean

Baseball Hall of Fame
- Induction: 2017

Erubiel Durazo Cárdenas (born January 23, 1974) is a Mexican former professional baseball player. He played for the Arizona Diamondbacks (1999–2002) and the Oakland Athletics (2003–2005) in Major League Baseball.

== Early life and amateur career ==
Durazo was born on January 23, 1974, in Hermosillo, Sonora, Mexico. He moved to the United States to play baseball at Amphitheater High School in Tucson, Arizona, ahead of his junior year. As a senior in 1993, Durazo batted .410 and helped the Panthers earn the No. 1 ranking in the country. He then enrolled at Pima Community College in Tucson, where he batted .434 over two seasons of play. After going unselected in the 1995 MLB draft, Durazo returned home to work on his father's cattle ranch.

== Professional career ==
After moving back to Mexico, Durazo signed with the Sultanes de Monterrey of the Mexican League, where he was named the Rookie of the Year in 1997 after batting .282 with eight home runs and 61 RBIs in 110 games. He hit .350 with 19 home runs and 98 RBIs in 119 games the following season, prompting his manager, Derek Bryant, to alert the Arizona Diamondbacks about the young prospect. Durazo's contract was purchased by the Diamondbacks in December 1998. He began his first minor league season with the El Paso Diablos of the Double-A Texas League, where he batted .403 with 14 home runs and 55 RBIs in 64 games, before he was called up to the Tucson Sidewinders of the Triple-A Pacific Coast League, where he hit .407 with 10 home runs and 28 RBIs in 30 games. On July 24, 1999, Durazo received his first major-league call-up after David Dellucci was placed on the 60-day disabled list.

Durazo made his major-league debut for the Diamondbacks on July 26, 1999, against the San Diego Padres. Two days later, also against the Padres, he went 3-for-5 and scored two runs. On August 7, Durazo hit his first MLB home run off of a Curt Schilling fastball during an 8–2 win over the Philadelphia Phillies. As a rookie, he hit .329 with 11 home runs in 52 games. Durazo helped the Diamondbacks by hitting a 2-out, 2-run home run off Tom Glavine in Game 5 of the 2001 National League Championship Series against the Atlanta Braves, which proved to be the series-winner, and the Diamondbacks went on to win the 2001 World Series.

On May 17, 2002, in a game against the Philadelphia Phillies, Durazo went 4-for-5, with three home runs (all of them 2-run shots), including a 3-run double in his final at-bat in the bottom of the 8th inning to give him a total of nine RBI's for the game, and extending Arizona's lead to 12–7. Those three runs Durazo batted in turned out to be more than enough, as the Diamondbacks ended up winning 12–9.

Durazo enjoyed his best season in 2004 when he hit .321 with 22 home runs and 88 RBI with Oakland. That offseason, he signed a one-year deal to remain with the team. However, his 2005 season was cut short by injury and he underwent Tommy John elbow surgery that July. In 2006, the Texas Rangers invited him to spring training, but he did not make the major league club. He split the 2006 season between the Triple A Oklahoma Redhawks of the Rangers organization, the Triple A Columbus Clippers of the New York Yankees organization, and the Triple A Rochester Red Wings of the Minnesota Twins organization.

Durazo was invited to 2007 spring training by the Oakland Athletics, where he played well, but was released before the start of the season. He joined the Sultanes de Monterrey of the Mexican League. On July 17, 2007, Durazo signed a minor league contract with the New York Yankees. He played in 29 games for their Triple-A team, the Scranton/Wilkes-Barre Yankees, and became a free agent at the end of the season.

In 624 games over seven seasons, Durazo posted a .281 batting average (547-for-1948) with 333 runs, 108 doubles, 6 triples, 94 home runs, 330 RBI, 307 bases on balls, .381 on-base percentage and .487 slugging percentage. He finished his career with a .988 fielding percentage playing at first base and several games at right field. In 16 postseason games, he hit .234 (11-for-47) with 5 runs, 3 doubles, 2 home runs, 7 RBI and 8 walks.

=== Winter ball ===
Durazo debuted with the Naranjeros de Hermosillo of the Mexican Pacific League (LMP) in 1997–98 and won the Rookie of the Year award after hitting .321 with seven home runs and 28 RBIs. He played 14 of his 15 LMP seasons with Hermosillo, batting .310 to go with 546 hits, 94 home runs, and 339 RBIs in 494 career games. Durazo led the team to two league titles in the 2000–01 and 2006–07 seasons, earning MVP honors during the latter campaign after batting .344 with 18 home runs and 56 RBIs. He was also named the MVP of the 2001 Caribbean Series despite Hermosillo finishing as runner-ups.

For the 2009–2010 season, Durazo was traded to the Águilas de Mexicali for David Cortés, but was subsequently sent on loan to the Yaquis de Obregón without playing a game for Mexicali. In 32 games with Obregón, he batted .356 with nine home runs and 22 RBIs. Durazo was traded back to Hermosillo in August 2010.

== Post-playing career and legacy ==
In 2017, Durazo was inducted into the Caribbean Baseball Hall of Fame.

In early 2018, Erubiel Durazo Field was inaugurated in Douglas, Arizona, marking the 40th baseball or softball field built (or refurbished) by the Arizona Diamondbacks Foundation.

On December 2, 2018, the Naranjeros retired Durazo's 44 number.

== Personal life ==
Durazo currently resides in Chandler, Arizona, with his wife Martha and their daughter Mariana.

In 2002, he was invited to Washington, D.C. as a guest of Vicente Fox for Cinco de Mayo festivities at the White House, where he met George W. Bush.

His second cousin is professional bull rider Edgar Durazo.
