= William Edgar =

William or Bill Edgar may refer to:

- William Edgar (politician) (1858–1948), Australian politician
- Bill Edgar (American football) (1898–1970), American football player
- William Edgar (engineer) (born 1938), British mechanical engineer
- William Edgar (apologist) (born 1944), American Christian apologist
