= Edgar Gonzalez =

Edgar Gonzalez may refer to:

- Édgar González (pitcher) (born 1983), Mexican baseball pitcher
- Édgar González (Mexican footballer) (born 1980), Mexican football striker
- Édgar González (footballer, born 1979), Paraguayan international football player
- Edgar Gonzalez (infielder) (born 1978), American baseball infielder
- Edgar González (footballer, born 1997), Spanish footballer
- Edgar Gonzalez Jr. (born 1996), member of the Illinois House of Representatives
