= Rio Grande Valley Livestock Show and Rodeo =

Annual livestock show in Texas

Rio Grande Valley Livestock Show and Rodeo Poster

The Rio Grande Valley Livestock Show and Rodeo is an annual event in Mercedes, Texas.

== History ==
In 1939, the Rio Grande Valley Livestock Show and Agricultural Exposition, the forerunner of today's show, was organized as a project of the Mercedes Chamber of Commerce. The first Show was held in 1940 on the grounds of a local livestock sales yard with makeshift pens and lean-to sheds. The show continued to be held on this same property until 1949, when it moved to its present location at 1000 North Texas in Mercedes, with the exception of 1943 to 1945.

In 1947, the Show was incorporated and chartered as a nonprofit, educational organization with a Board of Directors representing all of the four southernmost counties in Texas. Up until 1955, all livestock was shown primarily in tents. By 1979 all exhibits, which were once housed in some 12 tents, were in permanent buildings located on slightly more than 100 acres (0.40 km^{2}).

The show is made possible by volunteers and a Board of Directors. Without them, it would be impossible to produce the show, as the costs would be excessive. It is estimated that more than $25 million has been paid to FFA and 4-H exhibitors during the years the show has been in existence. The Rio Grande Valley Livestock Show has continued to grow each year, and now ranks as one of the top 10 in the state. The event hosts a parade, PRCA rodeo, carnival rides, competitive livestock events, and other attractions scheduled daily.

2020 saw the Show go on despite the COVID-19 pandemic, though attendees did wear masks, as did all workers & performers.
