= Edgar Rădulescu =

Romanian general

Edgar Rădulescu (27 December 1890 – 30 December 1976) was a Romanian general during World War II. He was a recipient of the Knight's Cross of the Iron Cross of Nazi Germany.

== Biography ==
Born in Bucharest, he fought in World War I. He advance in rank to lieutenant colonel in 1930 and to colonel in 1940. In 1941–1942 he served as Prefect of Brăila County. In April 1941 he was named commanding officer of the 19th Infantry Division and in September of that year he became commender of the II Corps (Artillery). In April 1942 he assumed command of the 11th Infantry Division and later that year he participated in the Battle of Stalingrad. In March 1943 he was promoted to brigadier general (dated back to October 1942) and in 1944 he fought in the Battle of Târgu Frumos. After Romania switched sides to the Allies in August 1944, Rădulescu commanded the II Corps in Hungary in Czechoslovakia in January–February and March–April 1945. At the end of the war he retired with the title of major general (Reserves). In August 1969, he was promoted to lieutenant general in the reserves.

== Awards ==
- Iron Cross (1939) 2nd and 1st Class
- Order of the Star of Romania, Officer class (8 June 1940)
- Order of the Crown of Romania, Commander class (27 January 1942)
- Order of Michael the Brave, 3rd class (13 September 1943)
- Knight's Cross of the Iron Cross (3 July 1944)

== Writings ==
- Din jurnalul meu de front (in Romanian). Bucharest: Editura Militară. 1972. OCLC 1050700020.
