= John Edgar (English footballer) =

English footballer

Personal information
- Full name: John David Edgar
- Date of birth: 1 December 1930
- Place of birth: Aldershot, Hampshire, England
- Date of death: 9 September 2006 (aged 75)
- Place of death: Hurworth-on-Tees, County Durham, England
- Positions: Inside forward; right half

Senior career*
Years	Team	Apps	(Gls)
19??–1951	Bishop Auckland		
1951–1954	Ferryhill Athletic		
1954–1956	Darlington	12	(0)
- * Club domestic league appearances and goals

John David Edgar (1 December 1930 – 9 September 2006) was an English footballer who played as an inside forward or right half in the Football League for Darlington and in non-league football for Bishop Auckland and Ferryhill Athletic.

== Life and career ==
Edgar was born in Aldershot, Hampshire, the son of Scottish footballer Dave Edgar. His father settled in County Durham after playing for Darlington, and Edgar began his senior career in that county. He played for Bishop Auckland during their run to the 1951 Amateur Cup final, but was omitted from the final itself. He was reported to have picked up a late injury, but Edgar himself suggested otherwise, never played for the club again, and continued his career with nearby Ferryhill Athletic.

He played his only League football in the Third Division North for his father's former club, Darlington, whom he joined from Ferryhill in 1954. Sunderland had at one time been interested in signing him, but his father advised him to continue his education rather than taking the risk of a career in professional football, so he trained as a schoolteacher and worked in local primary schools.

Edgar died in Hurworth-on-Tees, County Durham, in 2006 at the age of 75.
