= John George Edgar =

English writer

John George Edgar (1834–1864), was an English miscellaneous writer. Many of his books were intended for boys.

== Life ==
Edgar, the fourth son of the Rev. John Edgar of Hutton, Berwickshire, was born in 1834. He entered a house of business at Liverpool and visited the West Indies on mercantile affairs, but soon deserted commerce and devoted himself to literature.

== Works ==
Edgar's earliest publication was the Boyhood of Great Men in 1853, which he followed up in the same year with a companion volume entitled Footprints of Famous Men. In the course of the next ten years he wrote as many as fifteen other volumes intended for the reading of boys. Some of these were biographical, and the remainder took the form of narrative fiction based on historical facts illustrative of different periods of English history. Edgar was especially familiar with early English and Scottish history, and possessed a wide knowledge of border tradition.

He became the first editor of Every Boy's Magazine. In the intervals of his other work Edgar found time to contribute political articles, written from a strongly conservative point of view, to the London press.

== Early death ==
Under his close and continuous application to work his health broke down, and he suffered what was termed "congestion of the brain" and died shortly afterwards, on 22 April 1864.
