= Edgar Contreras =

Edgar Contreras may refer to:

- Edgar Contreras (surgeon) (born 1961), Dominican doctor and plastic surgeon
- Edgar Contreras (taekwondo) (born 1992), Venezuelan taekwondo athlete
