= Edgar McFadden =

American plant breeder and farmer

Undated photograph of McFadden in a wheat field

Edgar Sharp McFadden (February 3, 1891 – January 5, 1956) was an American farmer and plant breeder. In 1925, McFadden developed the "Hope" strain of wheat, which was resistant to stem rust and leaf rust. A Reader's Digest piece credited him with saving roughly 25 million people from starvation and saving American farmers $400 million in lost yields.

McFadden graduated from South Dakota State College and went on to become the school's official plant breeder. The U.S. Department of Agriculture cut funding for his position beginning in 1920, which forced him to mortgage his farm to continue his work to develop a rust-resistant strain of wheat. Following the development of the "Hope" strain, breeders made higher-yielding varieties, though keeping the rust resistance McFadden developed. In the late 1930s, estimates suggested that nearly all of California's wheat fields contained crops with "Hope" genetics.

McFadden died at his home in College Station, Texas, on January 5, 1956. He had suffered a heart condition since October 1955.
