= Edgar Fuller =

American mathematician

- Education: University of Georgia
- Occupation: Mathematician

Edgar Fuller is an American mathematician. He is a distinguished professor in the department of mathematics and statistics at Florida International University.
