= Dave Edgar (footballer, born 1902) =

Scottish footballer

Personal information
- Full name: David James Edgar
- Date of birth: 5 February 1902
- Place of birth: Edinburgh, Scotland
- Date of death: 1976 (aged 74)
- Place of death: Darlington, England
- Height: 5 ft 7 1/2 in (1.71 m)
- Position: Outside left

Senior career*
| Years | Team | Apps | (Gls) |
| 1918–1922 | Penicuik Juniors | | |
| 1922–1924 | East Fife | 79 | (9) |
| 1924–1929 | Heart of Midlothian | 35 | (9) |
| 1925 | → Airdrieonians (loan) | 7 | (2) |
| 1927 | → East Fife (loan) | 0 | (0) |
| 1929–1933 | Aldershot (Note: Appearances and goals in the Football League only) | 4 | (0) |
| 1933–1936 | Darlington | 88 | (20) |
| 1936–1937 | Workington | | |
| 1937–193? | Hexham | | |
- * Club domestic league appearances and goals

David James Edgar (5 February 1902 – 1976) was a Scottish footballer who played as an outside left. He scored 20 goals from 121 appearances in the Scottish Football League playing for East Fife, Heart of Midlothian and Airdrieonians, and was a member of the East Fife team that reached the 1927 Scottish Cup Final. After moving to England, he scored 20 goals from 92 appearances in the Football League playing for Aldershot and Darlington in the 1930s.

== Life and career ==
=== Early life and career ===
Edgar was born in Edinburgh and had lived in the Merchiston district. He played football for the Boys' Brigade team based at Dalry church, from where he and Peter Barrett followed Bobby Russell to Penicuik Juniors. In early 1922, Edgar performed well in junior international trial matches. He had a trial with Division One club Celtic before moving into the senior ranks in mid-February with East Fife of Division Two. He was joined soon afterwards by his former colleagues, manager David McLean believing that "the best value could not be got from the winger until they had the generalship of Barrett and the resourceful feeding of Russell" to complete the left side of his team.

=== Senior football ===
The trio soon established themselves in the team; in a 1927 retrospective, the Courier recalled how "in the course of the [1922–23] season the tremendous benefit of signing the other two was demonstrated over and over again". Early in that season, a Courier match report highlighted the danger stemming from Edgar's crosses despite his being marked by the best of the opponents' defenders. According to the Evening Telegraph, Edgar's return from six weeks out with a knee injury (sustained in East Fife's Scottish Cup draw at Kilmarnock) "made all the difference" to his team in a 1–0 win against Dunfermline Athletic: "he was in dazzling form, and attracted all eyes by his brilliant play."

After carrying an injury at the start of the 1923–24 season, he soon returned to form. Against Johnstone in early November, the Courier praised his trickery and the quality of crossing and shooting, though three weeks later against King's Park, "his finishing left a good deal to be desired", and against Arbroath in December he twice missed an open goal. His importance to the team was illustrated when he was selected for a January 1924 match against Cowdenbeath despite still recovering from illness. In September, the Evening Telegraph's reporter was reminding him to curb his tendency to "shoot from impossible angles" when a cross might be more productive. In his last appearance for East Fife, in mid-October, Edgar crossed for his team's first goal and scored the second in a 2–1 win at home to Alloa Athletic. He had scored 11 goals from 83 appearances in Scottish League and Cup.

=== Heart of Midlothian ===
Later that week, amid reported interest from Raith Rovers and from English clubs Burnley, Bury and Chelsea, Division One club Heart of Midlothian paid £1,000 for Edgar's services. He was one of a number of expensive signings made by Hearts, and the fee received was an East Fife club record. Edgar made his debut on 18 October, in a 2–0 win in the Edinburgh derby at home to Hibernian. He scored in the next match, a 3–3 draw with Partick Thistle, and scored twice more in the following three fixtures. He appeared in 15 consecutive matches, and scored once more, but was then dropped after a loss of form.

He played no more first-team football before joining Airdrieonians on loan on 10 March. He marked his debut, in a 7–1 defeat of Third Lanark, with two "beautifully taken" goals, and went to make seven appearances, without scoring again, as Airdrie finished runners-up in Division One. He returned to Hearts at the end of the season, and played in the semifinal and final of the Rosebery Charity Cup. He was retained for 1925–26, but played little for Hearts thereafter, Willie Murray – who went on to make more than 300 appearances for the club – being preferred at outside left.

=== East Fife in the Scottish Cup ===
In March 1927, Edgar returned to East Fife on loan to play a part in their Scottish Cup run. They had already eliminated two Division One teams when Edgar arrived, just ahead of the quarter-final tie away to another second-tier side, Arthurlie; the winner would become the first lower-division team for 24 years to reach the semi-final. The local press predicted a likely win, as well as a "grand reception" for Edgar and the resumption of his "old association" with Barrett and Russell. East Fife won 3–0, albeit against opponents reduced to ten fit men for the second half. The opening goal was fortuitous: with the Arthurlie goalkeeper well placed to take Edgar's cross, a defender touched the ball into his own net. The Athletic News reporter rated him the best forward on the pitch. East Fife then beat a third Division One team, Partick Thistle, to reach the final, in which they faced Celtic. After just seven minutes, Edgar crossed for Jock Wood to head the opening goal; a couple of minutes later, an East Fife defender put the ball into his own net when trying to make a clearance, and Celtic went on to win their twelfth Scottish Cup by three goals to one.

=== Aldershot and the Edgar case ===
Edgar returned to Hearts, and played occasionally for a further two seasons, finishing his career with 9 goals from 35 league appearances. He was also reported to have spent time playing in the United States. In 1928, Edgar was listed as open to transfer by Hearts at a fee of £300, which would not become payable unless the player joined another Football League club, whether in Scotland or England.

He moved to English Southern League club Aldershot Town for the 1929–30 season, and played for their reserve team in the London Combination as well as for the first team, who finished as champions. At the end of that season, in the expectation of being elected to the Football League, Aldershot paid Hearts the required fee. However, they lost out by one vote to Thames, so requested a refund of their payment. A commission of the Scottish League reported on "what [had] become generally known as the Edgar case", and the management committee ruled that Hearts retain the £300 and Edgar's League registration be cancelled. He thus became an Aldershot player. He remained with the club for two more Southern League seasons and, after their eventual election in 1932 and change of name to plain Aldershot, played four times for them in the Third Division South of the Football League.

=== Darlington ===
In July 1933, Edgar signed for Third Division North club Darlington. He opened the scoring in their first win of the season, 2–1 at home to Wrexham, which did not come until the last match of September, and helped them achieve an unexpected win in the final of the Durham Professional Cup against First Division club Sunderland. He became a regular member of the first eleven, making 36 of a possible 42 league appearances in his first season. He also played in all five of Darlington's matches in the 1933–34 Third Division North Cup as they progressed to the final at Old Trafford and beat Stockport County 4–3 with a last-minute goal from Dan Cassidy.

He was ever-present in all competitions in 1934–35, and scored 13 league goals as Darlington finished fifth in the table. The first of the 13 secured a draw against Doncaster Rovers and the second a week later was the only goal of the local derby away to Hartlepools United, which the Yorkshire Post thought "fluky": the goalkeeper placed himself to cover Jerry Best's shot, "but the ball cannoned off a defender to Edgar, who had only to touch the ball through an untenanted goal." He had a run of eight goals in nine matches in December and January, and his 86th-minute winner against Carlisle United in the last match of the season ensured Darlington finished in fifth place, ahead of Tranmere Rovers on goal average. Edgar continued in the side for the first eight matches of the 1935–36 season, but when the arrival of Gordon Reed displaced Best from the centre-forward position, new manager George Brown moved Best to outside left and Edgar appeared only twice more for the first team. He finished his Darlington career with 22 goals from 97 matches in senior competition, and was given a free transfer.

=== Later life ===
After retiring from League football, Edgar saw off competition from former players including Alf Common and Dickie Downs for the post of coach to County Durham secondary schools under the auspices of a scheme promoted by the Football Association. The Sunderland Echo reported that some of the other candidates dropped out of consideration because of their interpretations of the laws of the game, a topic in which Edgar had excelled. He combined his new role with playing North-Eastern League football for Workington; he helped that club win the North-Eastern League Cup in 1937. Although the Courier reported in the 1937 close season that Edgar "would not be averse to a return" to Scottish football, he and former Darlington teammate Jerry Best were at Hexham, also of the North-Eastern League, in 1938.

Edgar turned out for Darlington in 1940 in the wartime leagues, and remained living in the town. His son John had a brief spell of League football with the club in the 1950s. In 2001, John Edgar told the Northern Echo that as a young man he had had the opportunity to sign for Sunderland, but his father strongly advised him to continue his education rather than taking the risk of a career in professional football. "In those days you did as your father told you", so he trained as a schoolteacher and played mainly non-league football. Dave Edgar died in Darlington in 1976 at the age of 74.
