= Edgar A. Cohen =

American photographer (1859–1939)

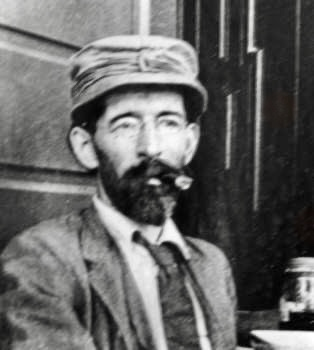
- Born: Edgar Andrew Cohen; September 23, 1859; Alameda, California, U.S.
- Died: 7 April 1939 (aged 79); Alameda, California, U.S.
- Resting place: Mountain View Cemetery (Oakland, California)
- Occupation: Photographer
- Years active: 1898–1925
- Known for: Landscape photography
- Spouses: Jessie G. Booth (m. 1886; div. 1902) Emily June (m. 1903)

Edgar A. Cohen (September 23, 1859 – April 7, 1939) was an American photographer known for his early landscape photography, which captured landmarks such as Yosemite Falls, Mount Tamalpais, and the California Missions. He documented the aftermath of the 1906 San Francisco earthquake.

== Early life and education ==
Cohen was born on February 4, 1885, in Alameda, California, to Alfred A. Cohen, a lawyer. He married Jessie Gray Booth on October 21, 1886, in San Francisco. The couple had two children together. They divorced in 1902, during which time Cohen was a commission merchant of San Francisco. He later remarried Emily June.

== Career ==
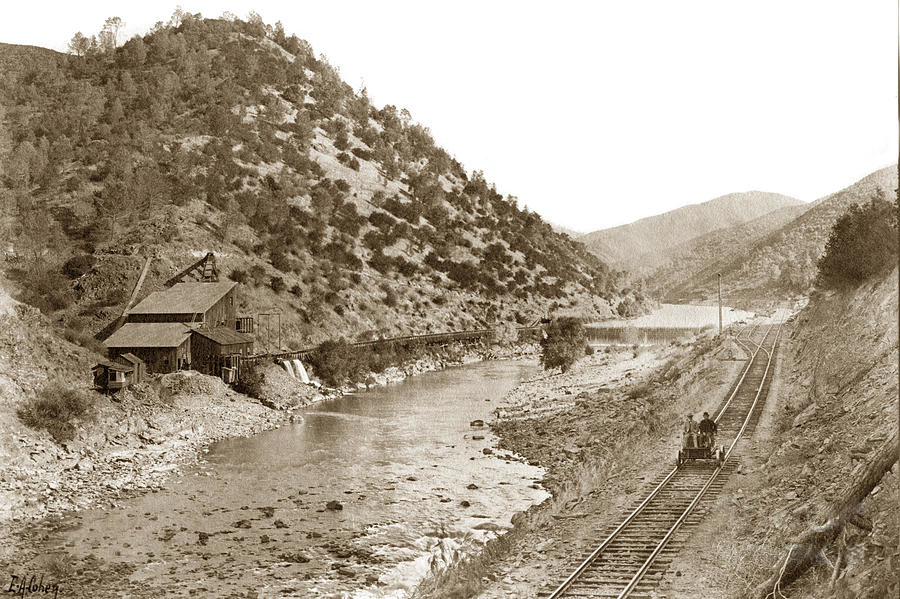
Yosemite Valley Railroad At The Mine (1907) by Cohen

Cohen began his photography career in 1898, with some of his earliest works featuring his family estate in Fernside, Alameda, California. He traveled throughout the state, capturing images of Mount Tamalpais, Yosemite, and many of the California Missions. He photographed Mission San Juan Capistrano, Mission Santa Barbara, and Yosemite Falls for The New Photo-miniature (1908).

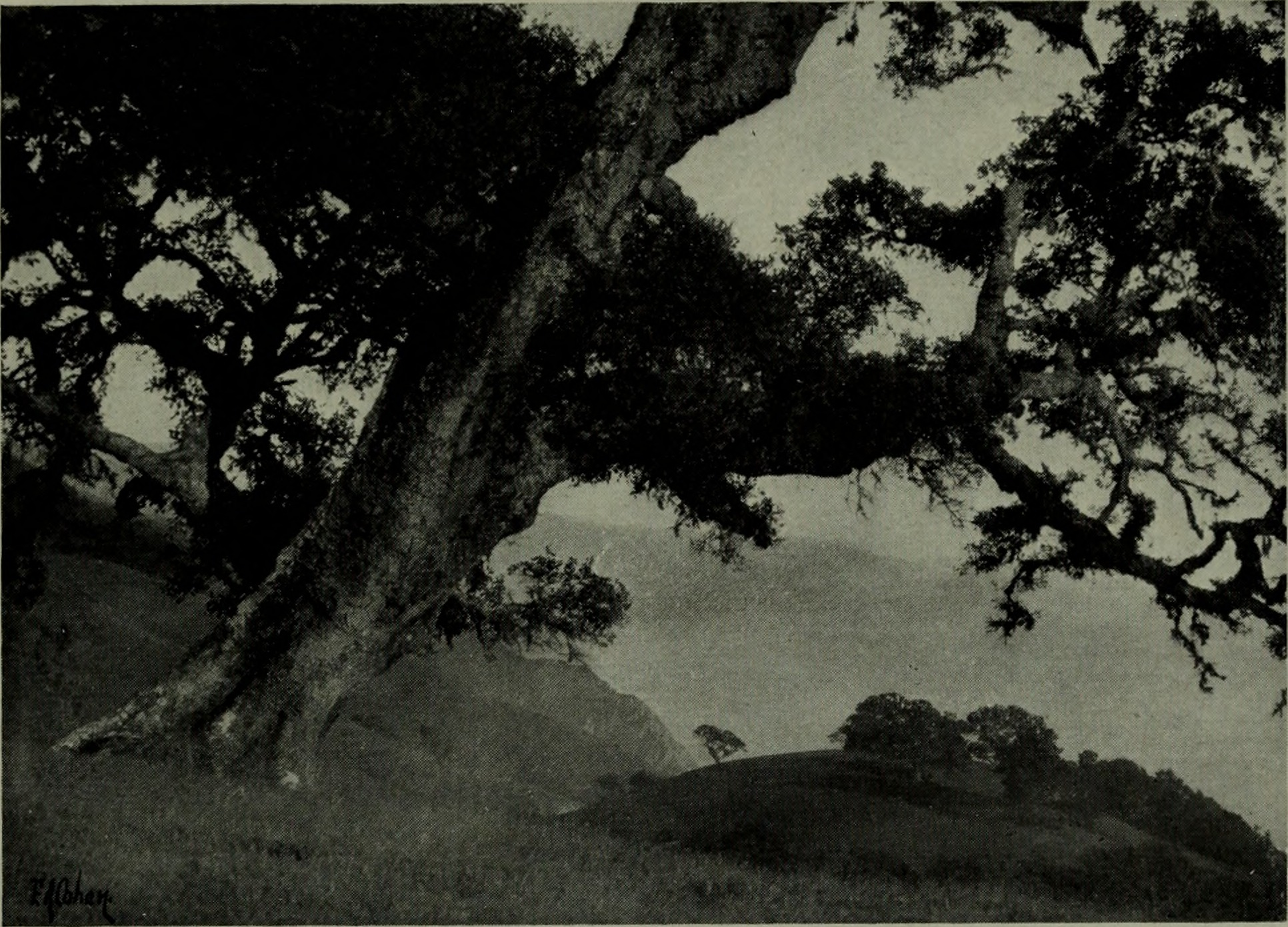
Down the Monterey Coast (1912) by Cohen

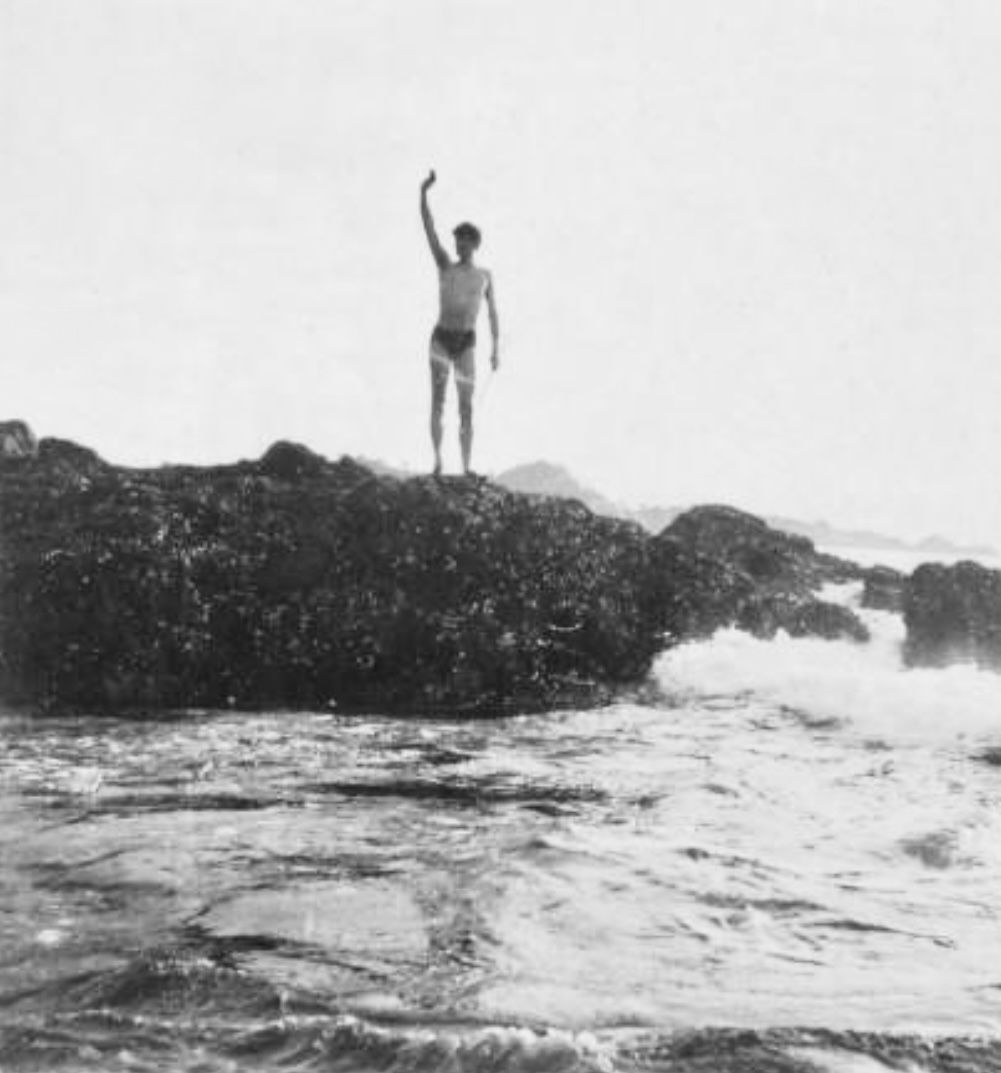
George Sterling on rocks in Carmel (1908) by Cohen

Cohen exhibited his work at the California Academy of Sciences in 1905 and with Paul Elder & Co. in San Francisco in 1907. In 1909 Cohen wrote an article About Carmel for The American Annual of Photography. He wrote two articles for The American Annual of Photography. In The New Scenic Route to Yosemite (1908), Cohen discusses Yosemite Valley Railroad, El Portal, and Bridalveil Fall. He was the official photographer for the Yosemite Valley Railroad. In 1914 he wrote Some Difficulties and Remedies, in Popular Photography on black-and-white techniques. His photography was featured in the National Geographic Magazine in 1925.

=== San Francisco earthquake ===
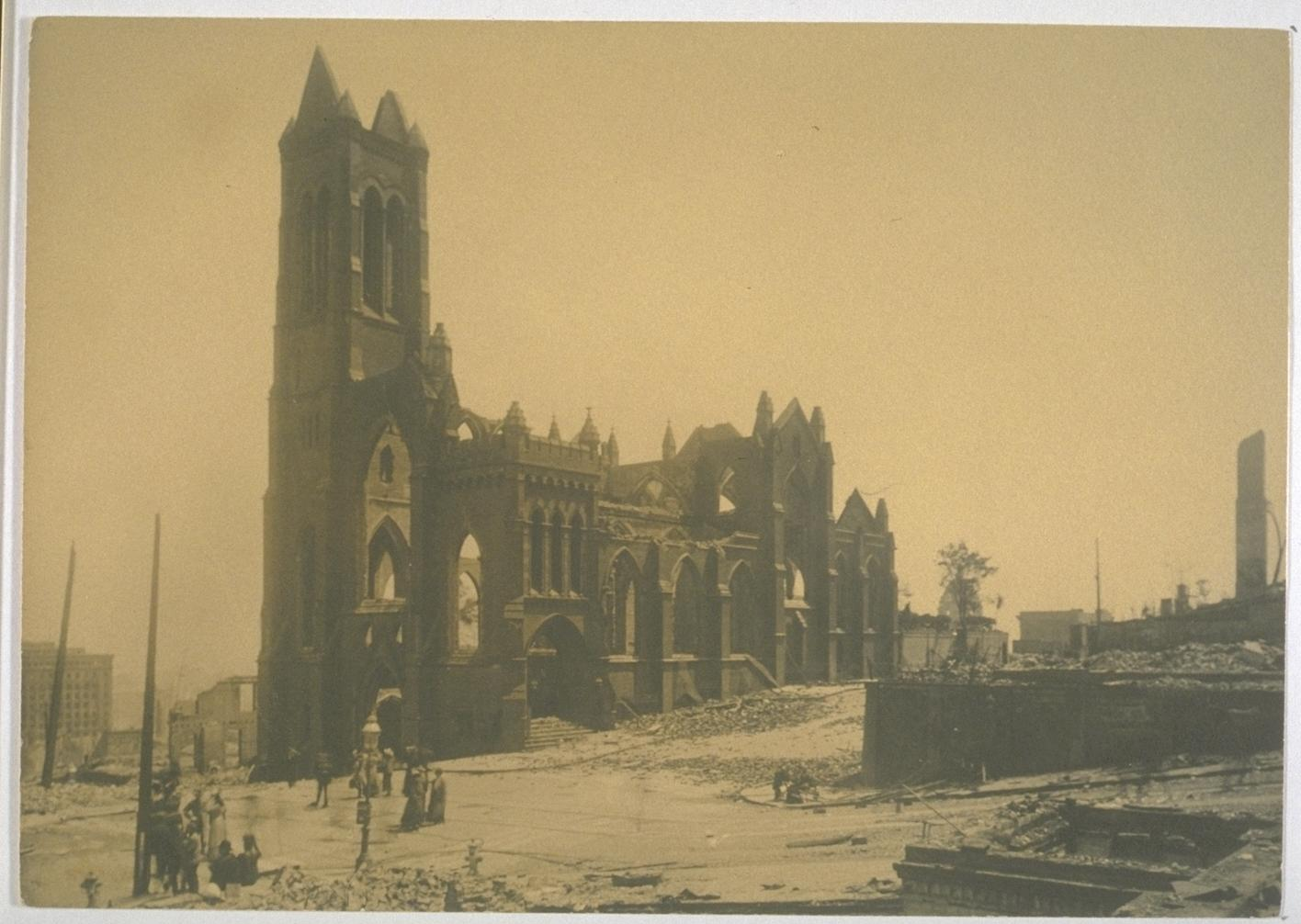
Grace Cathedral after the San Francisco earthquake, 1906, by Cohen

In 1906, Cohen was in San Francisco after the 1906 San Francisco earthquake and documented the city's ruins in a series of photographs. He wrote an article titled With a Camera in San Francisco, which was published in Camera Craft magazine. In it, Cohen laments the poor quality of most ruin and fire photographs, attributing it to the high demand for images that pressured both professionals and amateurs to produce prints quickly. The San Francisco Call reviewed the article.

== Death and legacy ==
Cohen died on April 7, 1939, in Alameda, California.
